= Economy of Brazil =

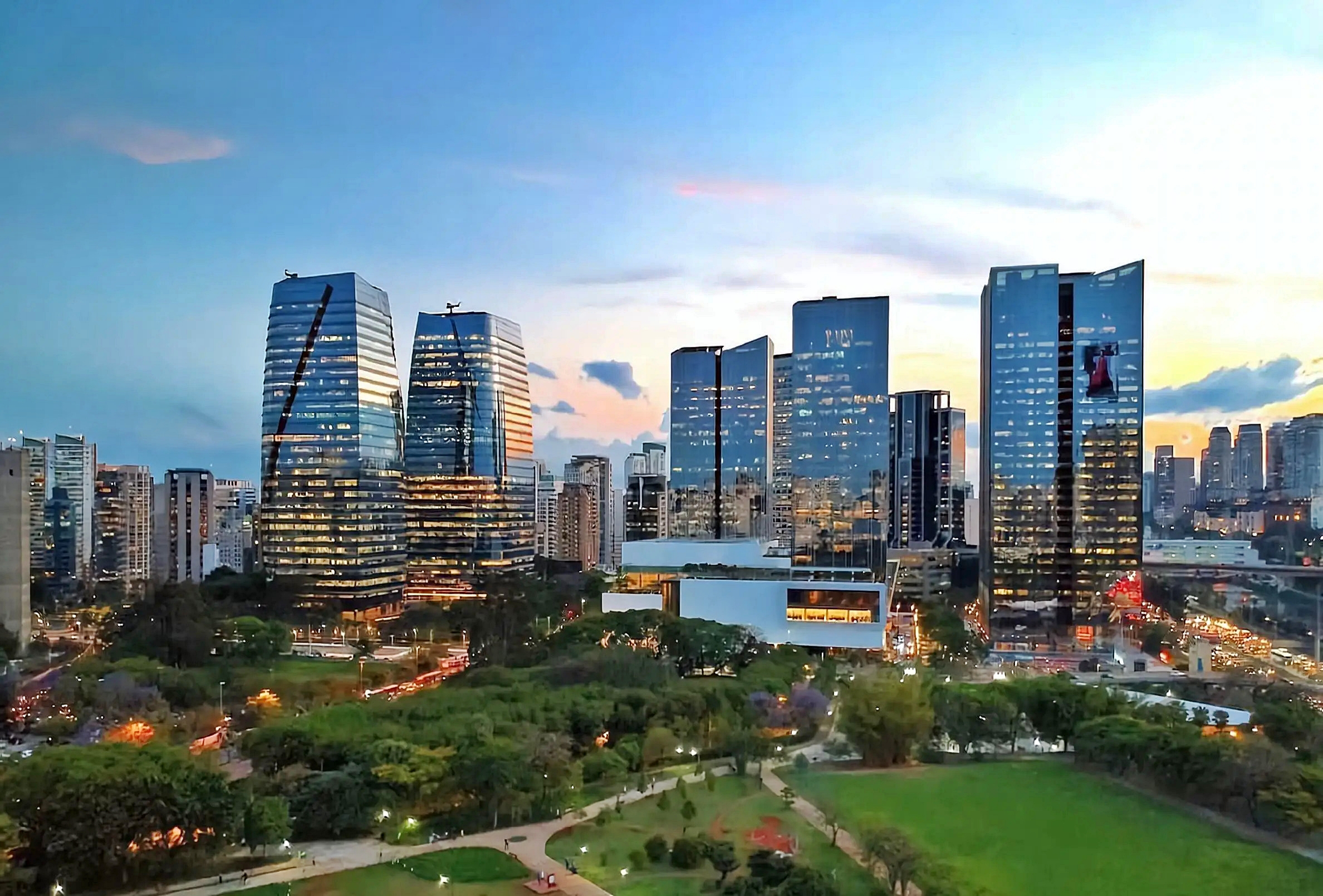
- São Paulo, the financial capital of Brazil
- Currency: Brazilian real (BRL, R$)
- Fiscal year: 1 January – 31 December
- Trade organizations: WTO, BRICS, MERCOSUR, G20 and others
- Country group: Developing/Emerging; Upper-middle income economy; Newly industrialized country

Statistics
- Population: ▲214.2 million (2026)
- GDP: ▲$2.654 trillion (nominal; 2026); ▲$5.266 trillion (PPP; 2026)
- GDP rank: 10th (nominal; 2026); 8th (PPP; 2026)
- GDP growth: 2.3% (2025)
- GDP per capita: ▲$12,397 (nominal; 2026); ▲$24,593 (PPP; 2026)
- GDP per capita rank: 79th (nominal; 2026); 82nd (PPP; 2026)
- GDP per capita growth: 1.9% (2025)
- GDP by sector: Agriculture: 6.1%; Industry: 20.1%; Services: 59.7%; (2025)
- Inflation (CPI): ▲4.58% YoY (Sep 2026)
- Population below national poverty line: ▼21% on less than $8.30/day (2024)
- Gini coefficient: ▼50.3 very high (2024)
- Human Development Index: ▲0.786 high (2023) (84th); ▲0.594 medium (2023); (94th)
- Corruption Perceptions Index: ▲35 out of 100 points (2025) (107th)
- Labor force: ▲108,318,282 (2025); ▲56.85% employment rate (2023)
- Labor force by occupation: Agriculture: 8.2%; Industry: 20.17%; Services: 71.63%; (2023)
- Unemployment: ▼5.2% (Sep 2026)
- Youth unemployment: ▼14% (2025)
- Informal employment: 35.6% (2025)
- Average gross salary: ▲ R$3,790 (~US$699) monthly (Sep 2026)
- Final consumption expenditure: ▼82.6% of GDP (2025)
- Gross capital formation: 17% of GDP (2025)
- Main industries: Textiles; shoes; kitchenware petrochemical; cement; lumber; iron ore; tin; steel; aircraft; motor vehicles and parts; other machinery; electrical equipment

External
- Exports: ▲$348.7 billion (2025)
- Export goods: Soybean and derivatives (soybean meal and soybean oil), iron ore and derivatives (semi-finished iron and steel), oil, pulp (cellulose), maize, beef, chicken meat, pork, sugar, coffee, tobacco, cotton, orange juice, gold, ethanol, footwear, decorative stones, glass and ceramics, aircraft, copper, plastics, wood, transport equipment, automobiles, vehicles, vehicle parts, electrical equipment
- Main export partners: China 28%; European Union 14.3%; United States 12%; Argentina 4.1%; Mexico 2.3%
- Imports: ▲$280.4 billion (2025)
- Import goods: Fertilizers, oil, medicines and pharmaceuticals, telecommunications equipment, semiconductors, electronics, machinery, electrical and transport equipment, chemical products, automotive parts, wheat, barley
- Main import partners: China 24.2%; European Union 18%; United States 15.5%; Argentina 5.2%; Russia 4.1%
- FDI stock: ▲$1.15 trillion (2025)
- Current account: ▼ −$63 billion (12 months to Aug 2026)
- Gross external debt: ▲$660.47 billion (2025)

Public finance
- Government debt: ▲82% of GDP (Jun 2026)
- Foreign reserves: ▼$362.8 billion (Sep 2026)
- Budget balance: ▲ −9.48% of GDP (Aug 2026)
- Revenue: $417.58 billion (2025)
- Spending: $428.62 billion (2025)
- Credit rating: Standard & Poor's: BB (Domestic); BB (Foreign); BB (T&C Assessment); Outlook: Positive; Moody's: Ba1; Outlook: Positive; Fitch: BB; Outlook: Stable
- All values, unless otherwise stated, are in US dollars.

Brazil has a diversified mixed economy. It is the largest in Latin America, the Southern Hemisphere and the second in Americas, in nominal terms. As of 2026, it is an upper-middle income and developing economy with the second largest GDP in the Americas in nominal and purchasing power parity terms. It is ranked as the tenth largest economy in the world in nominal terms, and the 8th largest in PPP terms. In 2024, according to Forbes, Brazil was the 7th largest country in the world by number of billionaires. Brazil is one of the ten chief industrial states in the world according to International Labour Organization. According to the International Monetary Fund (IMF), Brazil's nominal GDP was US$2.642 trillion; the country has a long history of being among the largest economies in the world and the GDP per capita was US$12,313 per capita.

The country is rich in natural resources. From 2000 to 2012, Brazil was one of the fastest-growing major economies in the world, with an average annual GDP growth rate of over 5%. Its GDP surpassed that of the United Kingdom in 2012, temporarily making Brazil the world's sixth-largest economy. However, Brazil's economic growth decelerated in 2013 and the country entered a recession in 2014. The economy started to recover in 2017, with a 1% growth in the first quarter, followed by a 0.3% growth in the second quarter compared to the same period of the previous year. It officially exited the recession. According to data released on 3 March 2026 by the Brazilian Institute of Geography and Statistics (IBGE), Brazil's economy grew by 3.4% in 2024 and 2.3% in 2025, indicating robust growth in the last two years. In the fourth quarter of 2025, gross domestic product (GDP) increased by 0.1% compared with the third quarter, when it had also recorded growth of 0.1%, reflecting relative stability in quarterly performance.

According to the World Economic Forum, Brazil was the top country in upward evolution of competitiveness in 2009, gaining eight positions among other countries, overcoming Russia for the first time, and partially closing the competitiveness gap with India and China among the BRICS economies. Important steps taken since the 1990s toward fiscal sustainability, as well as measures taken to liberalize and open the economy, have significantly boosted the country's competitiveness fundamentals, providing a better environment for private-sector development. Brazil is a member of diverse economic organizations, such as Mercosur, Prosur, G8+5, G20, WTO, Paris Club, Cairns Group, and is advanced to be a permanent member of the OECD.

From a colony focused on primary sector goods (sugar, gold and cotton), Brazil managed to create a diversified industrial base during the 20th century. The steel industry is a prime example of that, with Brazil being the 9th largest steel producer in 2018, and the 5th largest steel net exporter in 2018. Gerdau is the largest producer of long steel in the Americas, and Vale is the largest producer of iron ore in the world. Petrobras, the Brazilian oil and gas company, is the most valuable company in Latin America.

== History ==
When the Portuguese explorers arrived in the 16th century, the native tribes of current-day Brazil totaled about 2.5 million people and had lived virtually unchanged since the Stone Age. From Portugal's colonization of Brazil (1500–1822) until the late 1930s, the Brazilian economy relied on the production of primary products for exports.

In the Portuguese Empire, Brazil was a colony subjected to an imperial mercantile policy, which had three main large-scale economic production cycles – sugar, gold and from the early 19th century on, coffee. The economy of Brazil was heavily dependent on African slave labor until the late 19th century (about 3 million imported African slaves in total). In that period Brazil was also the colony with the largest number of European settlers, most of them Portuguese (including Azoreans and Madeirans) but also some Dutch (see Dutch Brazil), Spaniards, English, French, Germans, Flemish, Danish, Scottish and Sephardic Jews.

Subsequently, Brazil experienced a period of strong economic and demographic growth accompanied by mass immigration from Europe, mainly from Portugal (including the Azores and Madeira), Italy, Spain, Germany, Poland, Ukraine, Switzerland, Austria and Russia. Smaller numbers of immigrants also came from the Netherlands, France, Finland, Iceland and the Scandinavian countries, Lithuania, Belgium, Bulgaria, Hungary, Greece, Latvia, England, Ireland, Scotland, Croatia, Czech Republic, Malta, North Macedonia and Luxembourg, the Middle East (mainly from Lebanon, Syria and Armenia), Japan, the United States and South Africa, until the 1930s. In fact, international mass immigration to Brazil during the 19th century had positive effects on the country's human capital development. Immigrants usually exhibited better formal and informal training than native Brazilians and tended to have more entrepreneurial spirit. Their arrival was beneficial for the region, not only because of the skills and knowledge they brought to the country themselves, but also because of spillover effects of their human capital to the native Brazilian population. Human capital spillover effects were strongest in regions with the highest numbers of immigrants, and the positive effects are still observable today, in some regions.

In 2007, with a population of over 190 million and abundant natural resources, Brazil is one of the ten largest markets in the world, producing tens of millions of tons of steel, 26 million tons of cement, 3.5 million television sets, and 3 million refrigerators. In addition, about 70 million cubic meters of petroleum were being processed annually into fuels, lubricants, propane gas, and a wide range of hundreds of petrochemicals.

Brazil has at least 161,500 kilometers of paved roads, more than 150 gigawatts of installed electric power capacity and its real per capita GDP surpassed US$9,800 in 2017. Its industrial sector accounts for three-fifths of the South American economy's industrial production. The country's scientific and technological development is argued to be attractive to foreign direct investment, in 2019, Brazil occupied the 4th largest destination for foreign investments, behind only the United States, China and Singapore.

The agricultural sector, locally called the agronegócio (agro-business), has also been dynamic: for two decades this sector has kept Brazil among the most highly productive countries in areas related to the rural sector. The agricultural sector and the mining sector also supported trade surpluses which allowed for massive currency gains (rebound) and external debt paydown. Due to a downturn in Western economies, Brazil found itself in 2010 trying to halt the appreciation of the real.

One of the most important corruption cases in Brazil concerns the company Odebrecht. Since the 1980s, Odebrecht has spent several billion dollars in the form of bribes to bribe parliamentarians to vote in favour of the group. At the municipal level, Odebrecht's corruption was aimed at "stimulating privatisations", particularly in water and sewer management.

== Data ==
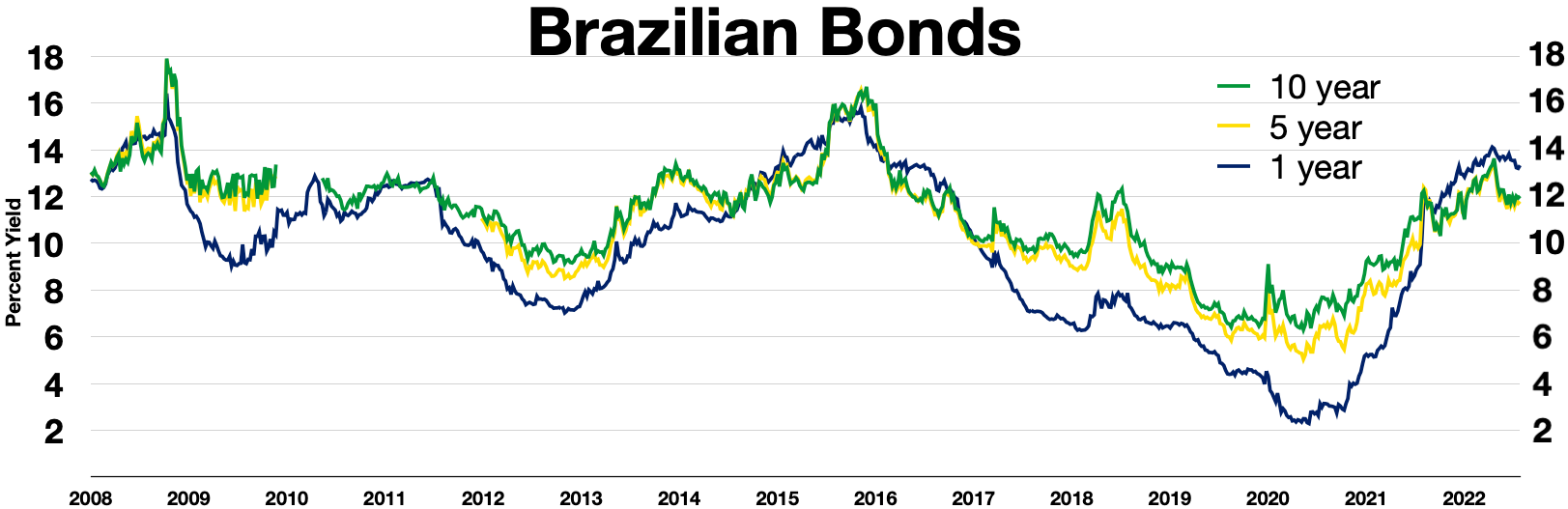
Brazilian bonds had an Inverted yield curve in August 2014 when the 1 year bond got above the 10 year bond 10 year bond 5 year bond 1 year bond

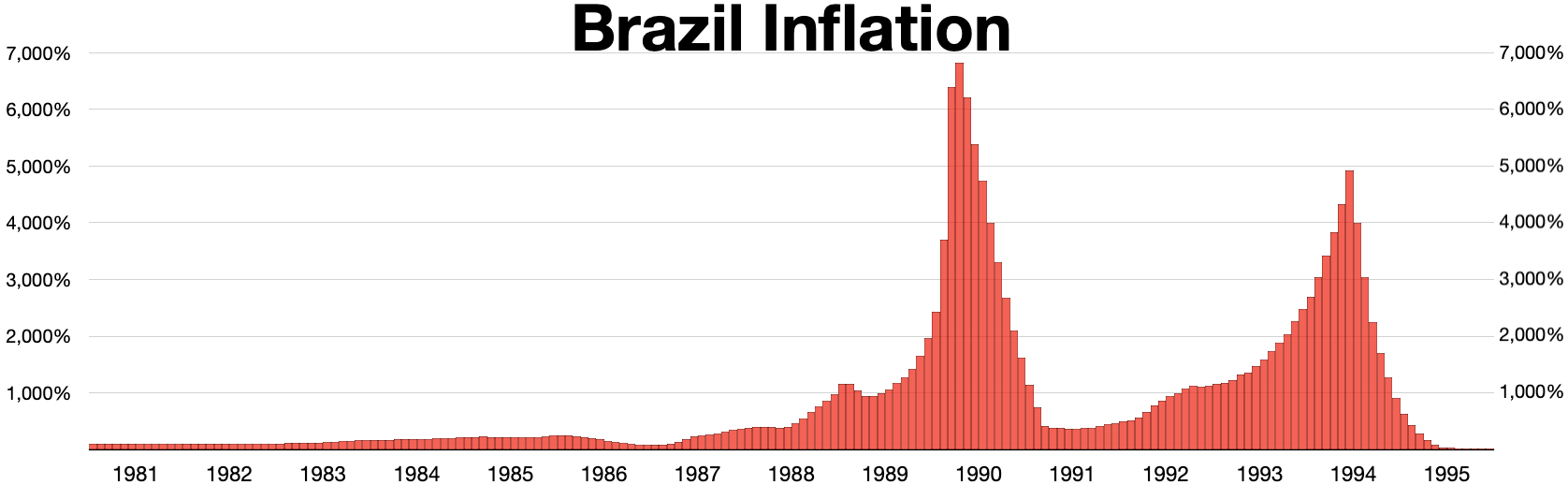
Brazil Inflation 1981-1995

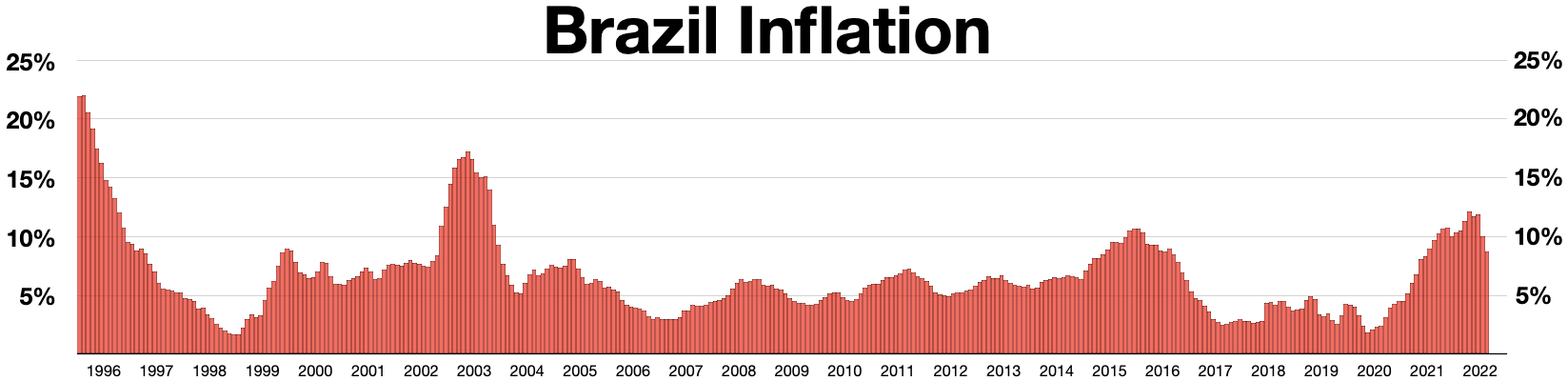
Brazil inflation 1996-2022

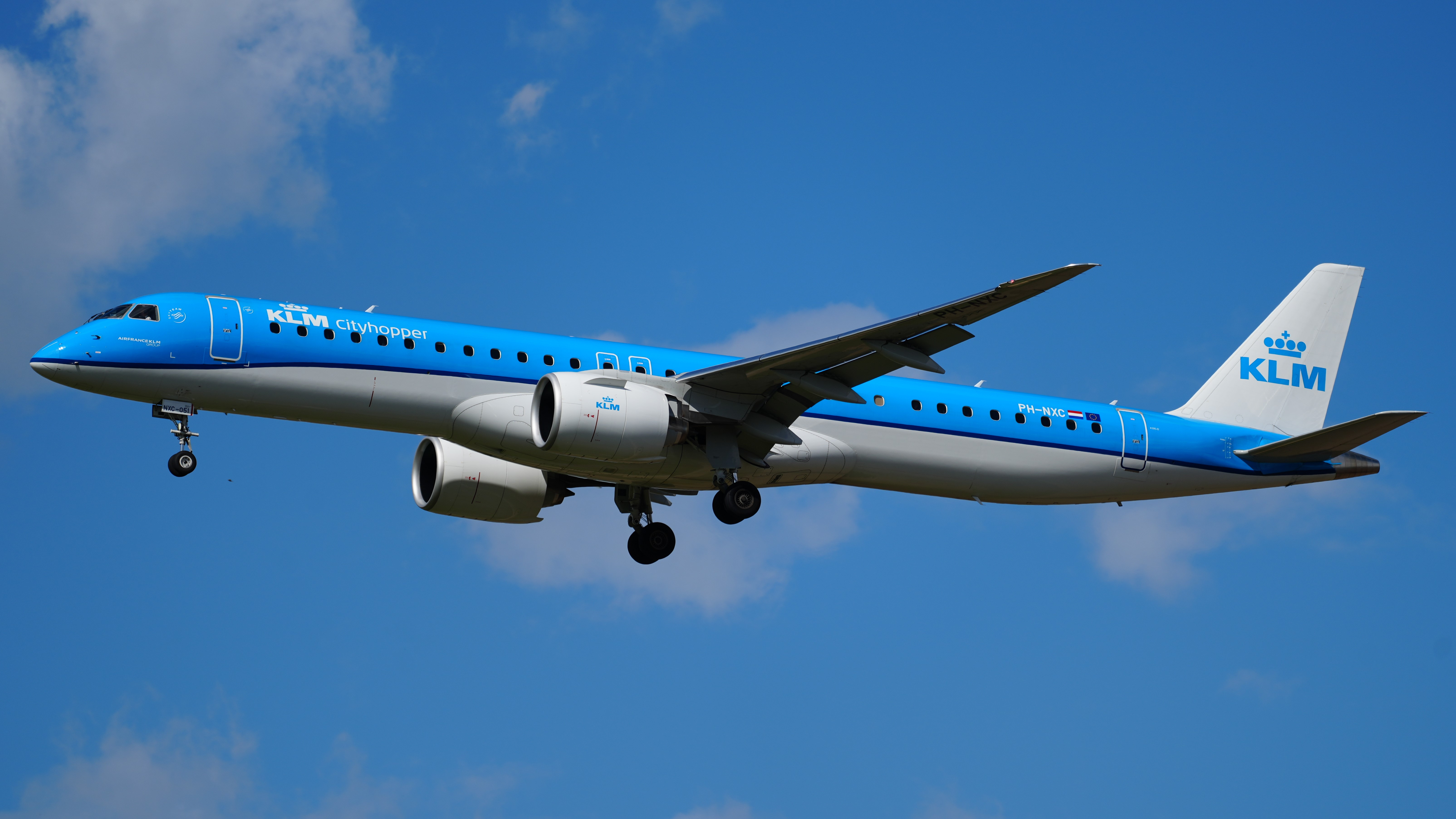
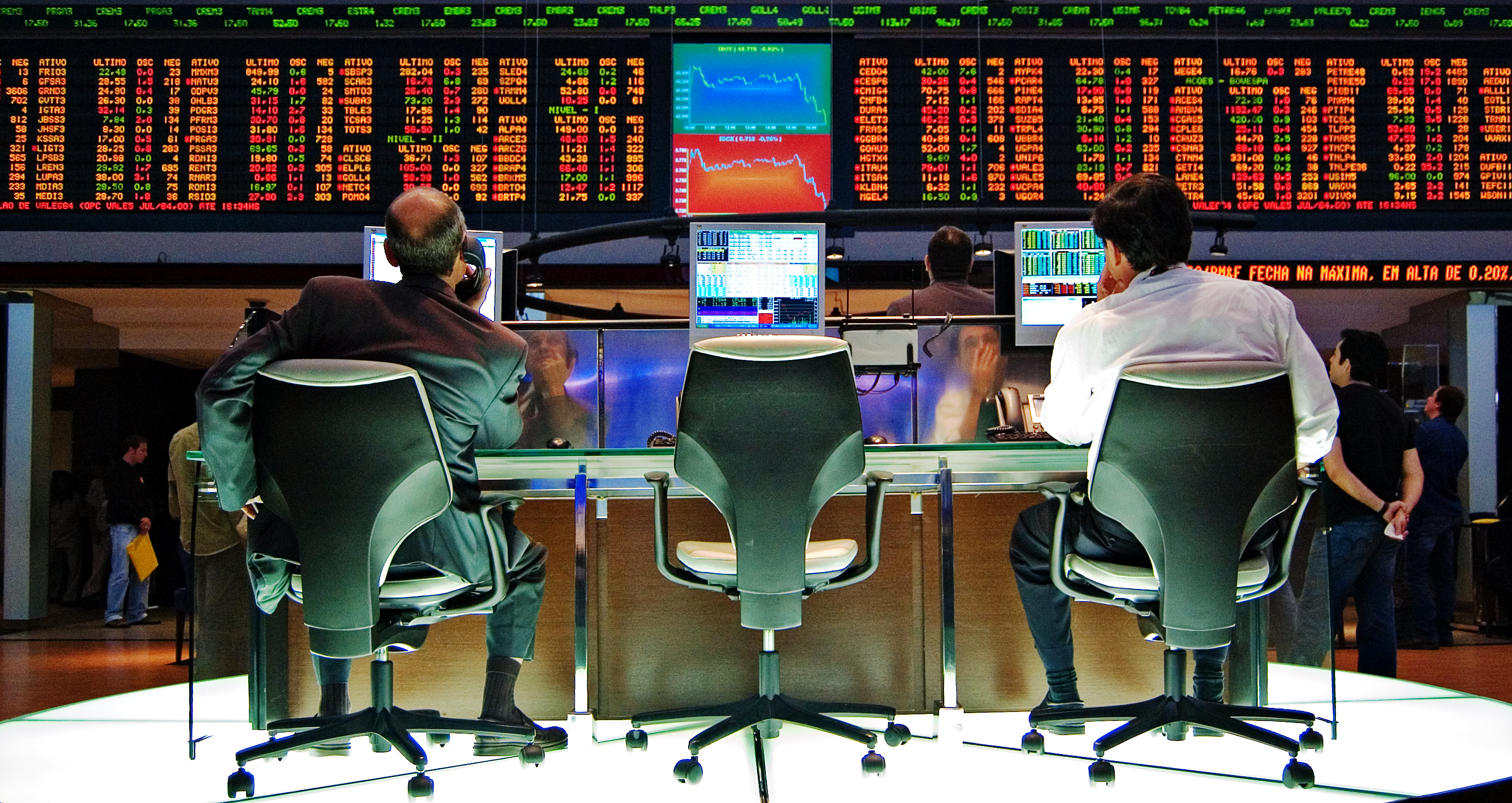
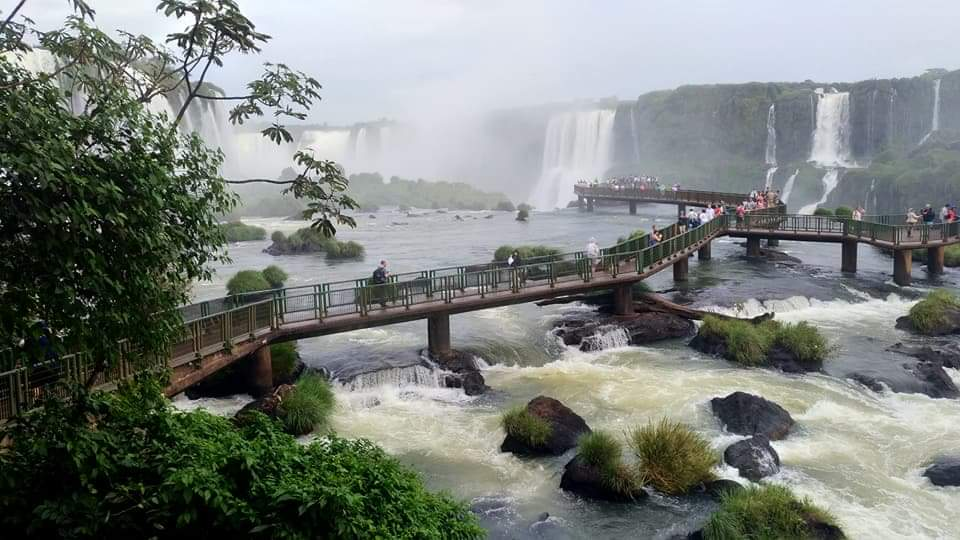
Brazil is one of the ten chief industrial states in the world according to ILO

The following table shows the main economic indicators in 1980–2023 (with IMF estimates for 2024–2028). Inflation below 5% is in green.

Year	GDP (in bn. US$PPP)	GDP per capita (in US$ PPP)	GDP (in bn. US$ nominal)	GDP per capita (in US$ nominal)	GDP growth (real)	Inflation rate (in Percent)	Unemployment (in Percent)	Government debt (in % of GDP)
1980	570.5	4,811.9	145.8	1,203.6	▲9.2%	▲90.2%	n/a	n/a
1981	▲597.0	▲4,925.3	▲167.6	▲1,353.0	▼−4.4%	▲101.7%	n/a	n/a
1982	▲637.7	▲5,147.3	▲179.2	▲1,415.3	▲0.6%	▲100.6%	n/a	n/a
1983	▲640.1	▼5,057.3	▼143.7	▼1,110.7	▼−3.4%	▲135.0%	n/a	n/a
1984	▲698.4	▲5,402.7	▼143.0	▼1,082.2	▲5.3%	▲192.1%	n/a	n/a
1985	▲777.4	▲5,890.6	▲226.9	▲1,682.8	▲7.9%	▲226.0%	n/a	n/a
1986	▲852.9	▲6,334.2	▲263.3	▲1,913.3	▲7.5%	▲147.1%	n/a	n/a
1987	▲905.5	▲6,596.4	▲286.5	▲2,042.9	▲3.6%	▲228.3%	n/a	n/a
1988	▲939.9	▲6,722.2	▲320.1	▲2,240.5	▲0.3%	▲629.1%	n/a	n/a
1989	▲1,008.0	▲7,083.3	▲439.4	▲3,022.0	▲3.2%	▲1430.7%	n/a	n/a
1990	▼1,002.1	▼6,836.1	▲455.3	▲3,108.8	▼−4.2%	▲2947.7%	n/a	n/a
1991	▲1,046.7	▲7,020.5	▼399.2	▼2,717.5	▲1.0%	▲432.8%	10.1%	n/a
1992	▲1,065.6	▲7,031.3	▼382.5	▼2,561.1	▼−0.5%	▲952.0%	▲11.6%	n/a
1993	▲1,141.7	▲7,414.4	▲429.2	▲2,828.5	▲4.7%	▲1927.4%	▼11.0%	n/a
1994	▲1,228.3	▲7,852.0	▲546.8	▲3,547.0	▲5.3%	▲2075.8%	▼10.5%	n/a
1995	▲1,309.4	▲8,364.1	▲770.9	▲4,923.9	▲4.4%	▲66.0%	▼9.9%	n/a
1996	▲1,362.9	▲8,457.1	▲851.1	▲5,281.7	▲2.2%	▲15.8%	▲11.2%	n/a
1997	▲1,433.4	▲8,757.6	▲883.9	▲5,400.0	▲3.4%	▲6.9%	▲11.6%	n/a
1998	▲1,454.5	▼8,749.7	▼864.3	▼5,199.5	▲0.3%	▲3.2%	▲14.7%	n/a
1999	▲1,481.9	▲8,816.5	▼599.6	▼3,567.6	▲0.5%	▲4.9%	14.7%	n/a
2000	▲1,581.9	▲9,328.0	▲655.5	▲3,864.9	▲4.4%	▲7.0%	▼13.9%	65.6%
2001	▲1,640.1	▲9,536.6	▼560.0	▼3,256.2	▲1.4%	▲6.8%	▼12.5%	▲70.1%
2002	▲1,716.5	▲9,852.9	▼509.8	▼2,926.3	▲3.1%	▲8.5%	▲13.0%	▲78.8%
2003	▲1,770.3	▲10,037.8	▲558.2	▲3,165.2	▲1.1%	▲14.7%	▲13.7%	▼73.8%
2004	▲1,922.6	▲10,772.3	▲669.3	▲3,750.1	▲5.8%	▲6.6%	▼12.9%	▼70.1%
2005	▲2,046.3	▲11,334.1	▲891.6	▲4,938.5	▲3.2%	▲6.9%	▼11.4%	▼68.6%
2006	▲2,193.1	▲12,012.3	▲1,107.6	▲6,067.0	▲4.0%	▲4.2%	▲11.5%	▼65.8%
2007	▲2,389.0	▲12,949.0	▲1,397.1	▲7,572.6	▲6.1%	▲3.6%	▼10.9%	▼64.1%
2008	▲2,558.9	▲13,726.5	▲1,695.9	▲9,096.9	▲5.1%	▲5.7%	▼9.4%	▼62.3%
2009	▲2,572.1	▼13,638.5	▼1,669.2	▼8,851.1	▼−0.1%	▲4.9%	▲9.7%	▲65.5%
2010	▲2,798.9	▲14,672.8	▲2,208.7	▲11,578.7	▲7.5%	▲5.0%	▼8.5%	▼63.0%
2011	▲2,970.6	▲15,491.0	▲2,614.0	▲13,631.4	▲4.0%	▲6.6%	▼7.8%	▼61.2%
2012	▲2,998.5	▲15,555.6	▼2,464.1	▼12,782.8	▲1.9%	▲5.4%	▼7.4%	▲62.2%
2013	▲3,133.9	▲16,168.6	▲2,471.7	▼12,752.3	▲3.0%	▲6.2%	▼7.2%	▼60.2%
2014	▲3,187.2	▲16,352.3	▼2,456.1	▼12,601.3	▲0.5%	▲6.3%	▼6.9%	▲62.3%
2015	▼3,014.8	▼15,379.9	▼1,800.0	▼9,183.0	▼−3.5%	▲9.0%	▲8.6%	▲72.6%
2016	▼2,939.1	▼14,915.4	▼1,796.6	▼9,117.6	▼−3.3%	▲8.7%	▲11.7%	▲78.3%
2017	▲3,018.7	▲15,242.7	▲2,063.5	▲10,419.6	▲1.3%	▲3.4%	▲12.9%	▲83.6%
2018	▲3,146.4	▲15,805.9	▼1,916.9	▼9,629.6	▲1.8%	▲3.7%	▼12.4%	▲85.6%
2019	▲3,241.9	▲16,176.0	▼1,873.3	▼9,364.2	▲1.2%	▲3.7%	▼12.0%	▲87.1%
2020	▼3,335.9	▼16,063.9	▼1,476.1	▼7,057.5	▼−3.3%	▲3.2%	▲13.8%	▲96.0%
2021	▲3,787.7	▲18,028.3	▲1,670.6	▲7,952.6	▲5.0%	▲8.3%	▼13.2%	▼90.1%
2022	▲4,180.2	▲19,824.7	▲1,951.0	▲9,256.3	▲3.0%	▲9.4%	▼9.3%	▼85.3%
2023	▲4,456.6	▲21,052.9	▲2,173.8	▲10,268.0	▲3.2%	▲3.7%	▼8.3%	▲88.0%
2024	▲4,702.0	▲22,123.5	▲2,188.4	▲10,296.2	▲3.5%	▲3.4%	▼8.2%	▲90.3%
2025	▲4,890.9	▲22,928.1	▲2,307.1	▲10,816.8	▲2.2%	▲3.3%	▲8.1%	▲92.4%
2026	▲5,094.0	▲23,799.3	▲2,444.9	▲11,423.8	▲2.3%	▲3.0%	8.1%	▲93.9%
2027	▲5,309.5	▲24,728.8	▲2,571.5	▲11,977.4	▲2.4%	▲3.0%	▲8.0%	▲95.0%
2028	▲5,539.3	▲25,724.6	▲2,709.5	▲12,583.1	▲2.5%	▲3.0%	▲7.9%	▲96.0%
2029	▲5,780.4	▲26,771.9	▲2,854.9	▲13,222.9	▲2.5%	▲3.0%	▲7.2%	▲98.0%

The daily median per person income was $15.74 PPP in 2023.

== Sectors ==
The service sector is the largest component of the gross domestic product (GDP) at 67.0 percent, followed by the industrial sector at 27.5 percent. Agriculture represents 5.5 percent of GDP (2011). The Brazilian labor force is estimated at 100.77 million of which 10 percent is occupied in agriculture, 19 percent in the industry sector and 71 percent in the service sector.

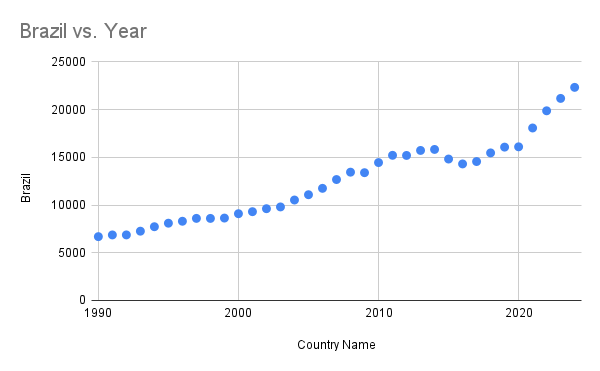

=== Agricultural, animal husbandry and forestry ===
Agriculture production
Main products	Soybeans, maize, sugarcane, coffee, beef, chicken meat, cellulose, cotton, cocoa, citrus (orange, lemon), pineapple
Labor force	15.7% of total labor force
GDP of sector	5.9% of total GDP

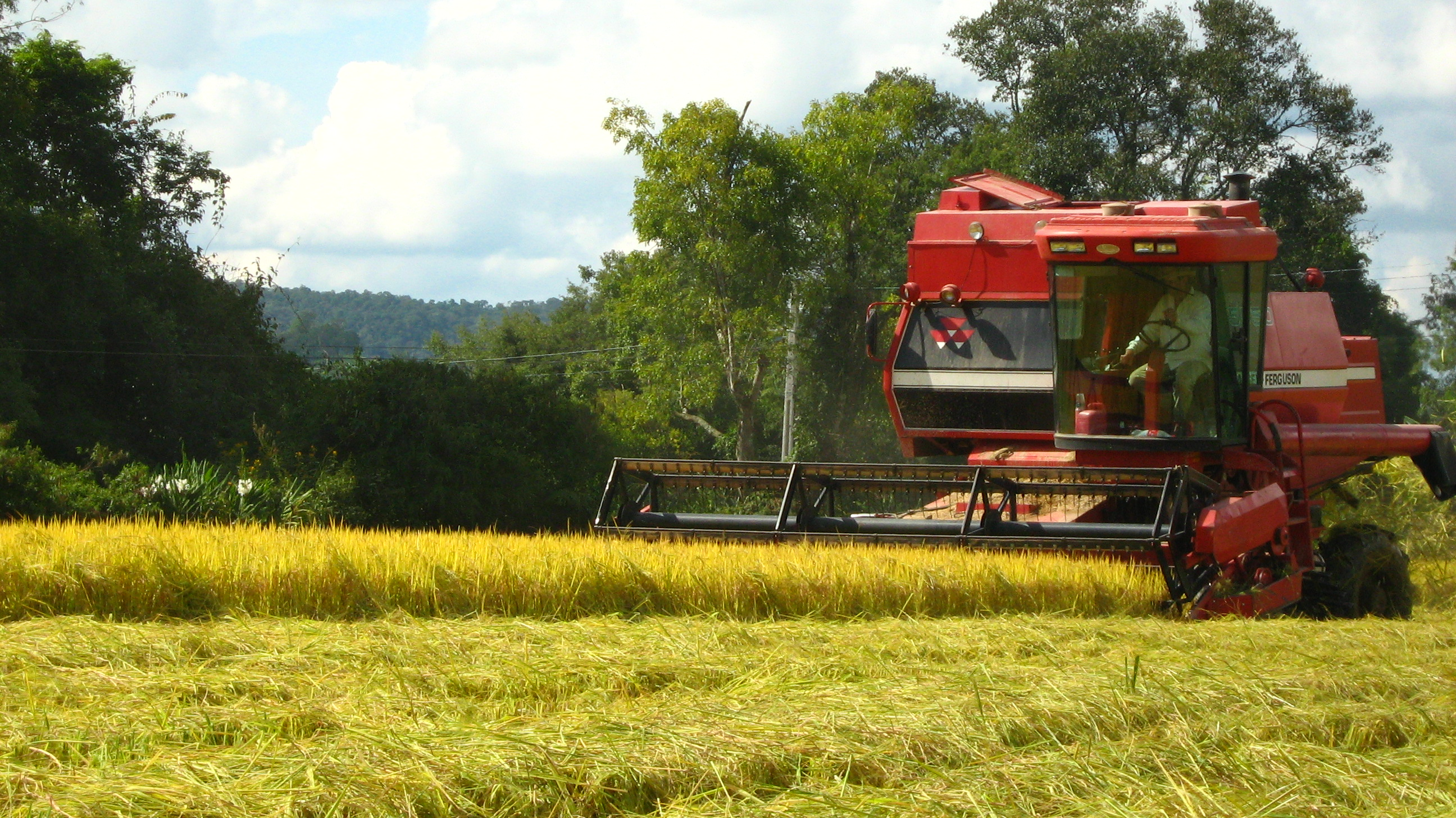
Combine harvester on a plantation

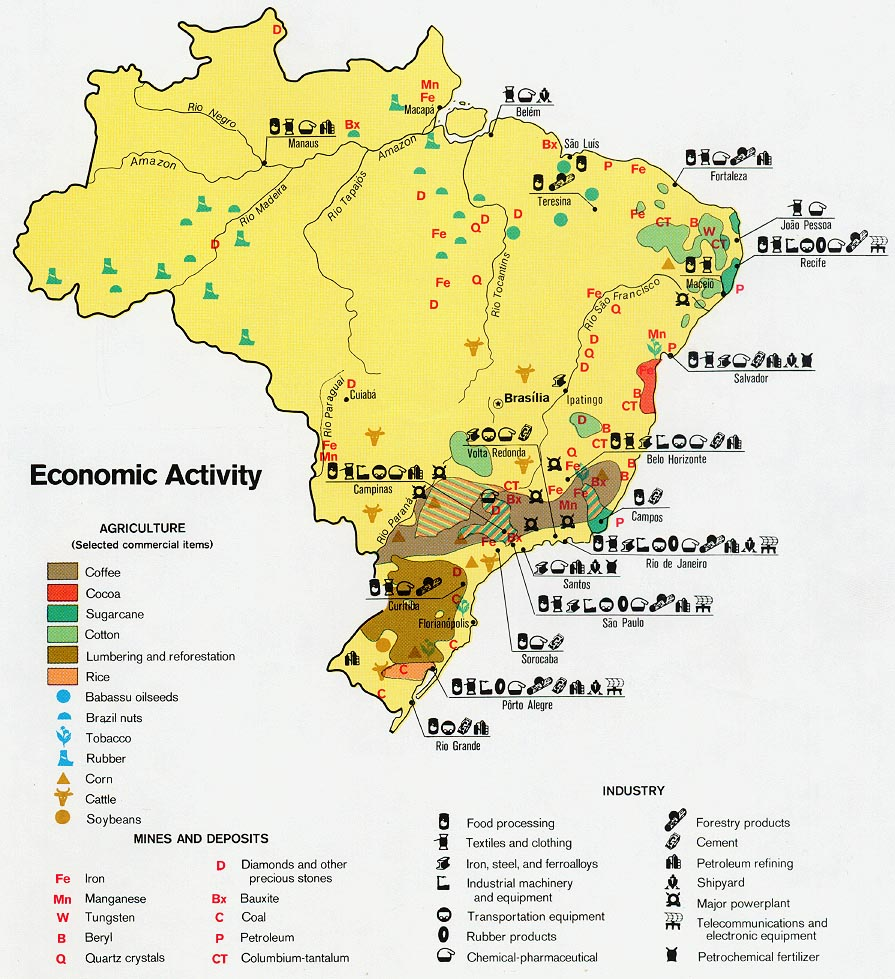
Economic activity in Brazil (1977).

Brazil is the world's largest producer of sugarcane, soy, coffee, orange, guaraná, açaí and Brazil nut; is one of the top 5 producers of maize, papaya, tobacco, pineapple, banana, cotton, beans, coconut, watermelon and lemon; is one of the top 10 world producers of cocoa, cashew, avocado, tangerine, persimmon, mango, guava, rice, sorghum and tomato; and is one of the top 15 world producers of grape, apple, melon, peanut, fig, peach, onion, palm oil and natural rubber.

In the production of animal proteins, Brazil is today one of the largest countries in the world. In 2019, the country was the world's largest exporter of chicken meat. It was also the second largest producer of beef, the world's third largest producer of milk, the world's fourth largest producer of pork and the seventh largest producer of eggs in the world.

Agribusiness contributes to Brazil's trade balance, in spite of trade barriers and subsidizing policies adopted by the developed countries.

In the space of fifty five years (1950 to 2005), the population of Brazil grew from 51 million to approximately 187 million inhabitants, an increase of over 2 percent per year. Brazil created and expanded a complex agribusiness sector. However, some of this is at the expense of the environment, including the Amazon.

The importance given to the rural producer takes place in the shape of the agricultural and cattle-raising plan and through another specific subsidy program geared towards family agriculture Programa de Fortalecimento da Agricultura Familiar (Pronaf), which guarantees financing for equipment and cultivation and encourages the use of new technology. With regards to family agriculture, over 800 thousand rural inhabitants are assisted by credit, research and extension programs. A special line of credit is available for women and young farmers.

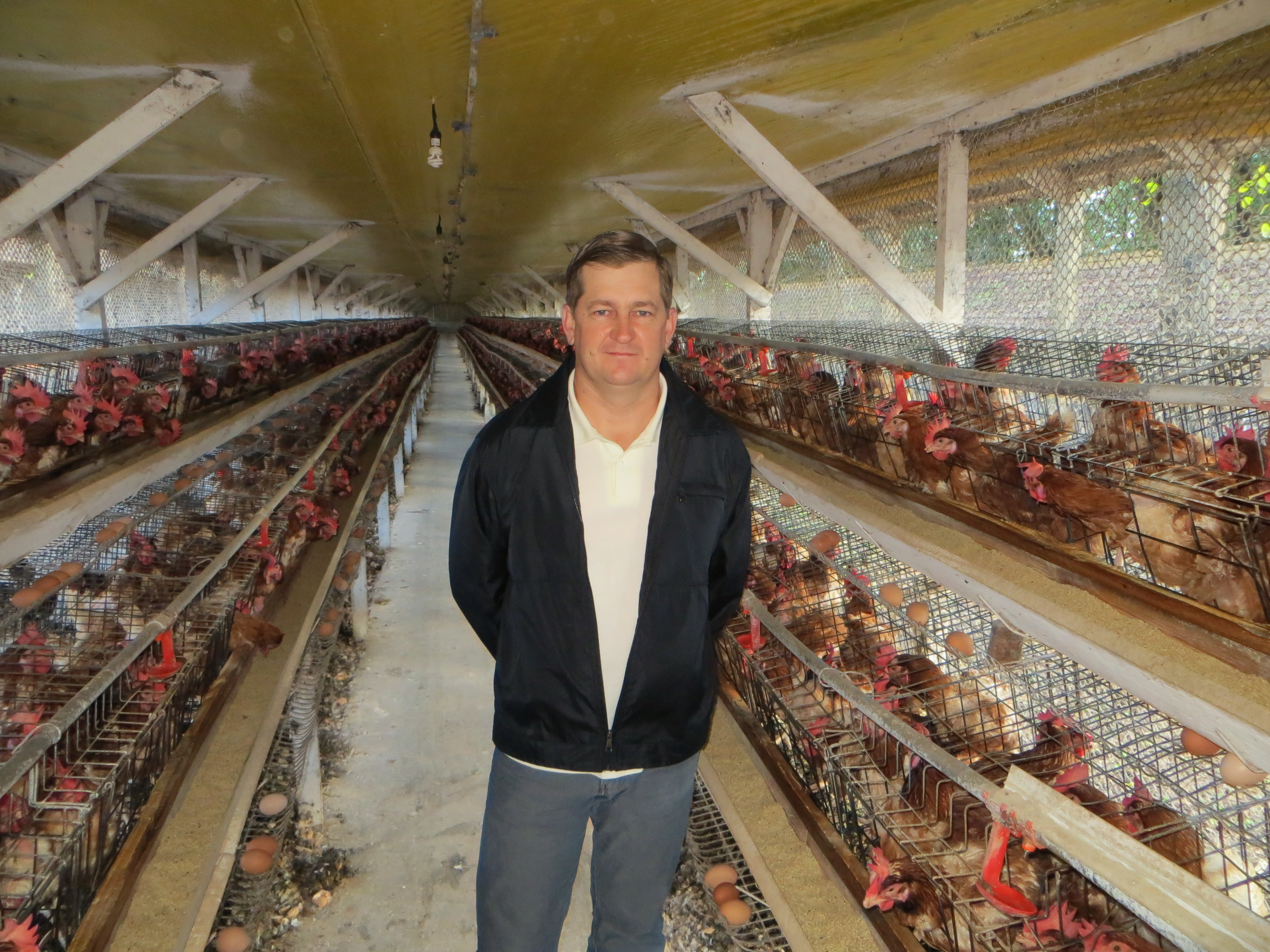
Brazil is the world's largest exporter of chicken meat. Farm in Southern Brazil.

With The Land Reform Program, on the other hand, the country's objective is to provide suitable living and working conditions for families who live in areas allotted by the State, an initiative capable of generating jobs. Through partnerships, public policies and international partnerships, the government is working towards guaranteeing infrastructure for the settlements, following the examples of schools and health outlets. The idea is that access to land represents just the first step towards the implementation of a quality land reform program.

Over 600,000 km^{2} of land are divided into approximately five thousand areas of rural property; an agricultural area currently with three borders: the Central-western region (savannah), the northern region (area of transition) and parts of the northeastern region (semi-arid). At the forefront of grain crops, which produce over 110 million tonnes/year, is the soybean, yielding 50 million tonnes.

In the cattle-raising sector, the "green ox," which is raised in pastures, on a diet of hay and mineral salts, conquered markets in Asia, Europe and the Americas, particularly after the "mad cow disease" scare period. Brazil has the largest cattle herd in the world, with 198 million heads, responsible for exports of more than US$1 billion/year.

A pioneer and leader in the manufacture of short-fiber timber cellulose, Brazil has also achieved positive results within the packaging sector, in which it is the fifth largest world producer. In the foreign markets, it answers for 25 percent of global exports of raw cane and refined sugar; it is the world leader in soybean exports and is responsible for 80 percent of the planet's orange juice, and since 2003, has had the highest sales figures for beef and chicken.

=== Mining ===
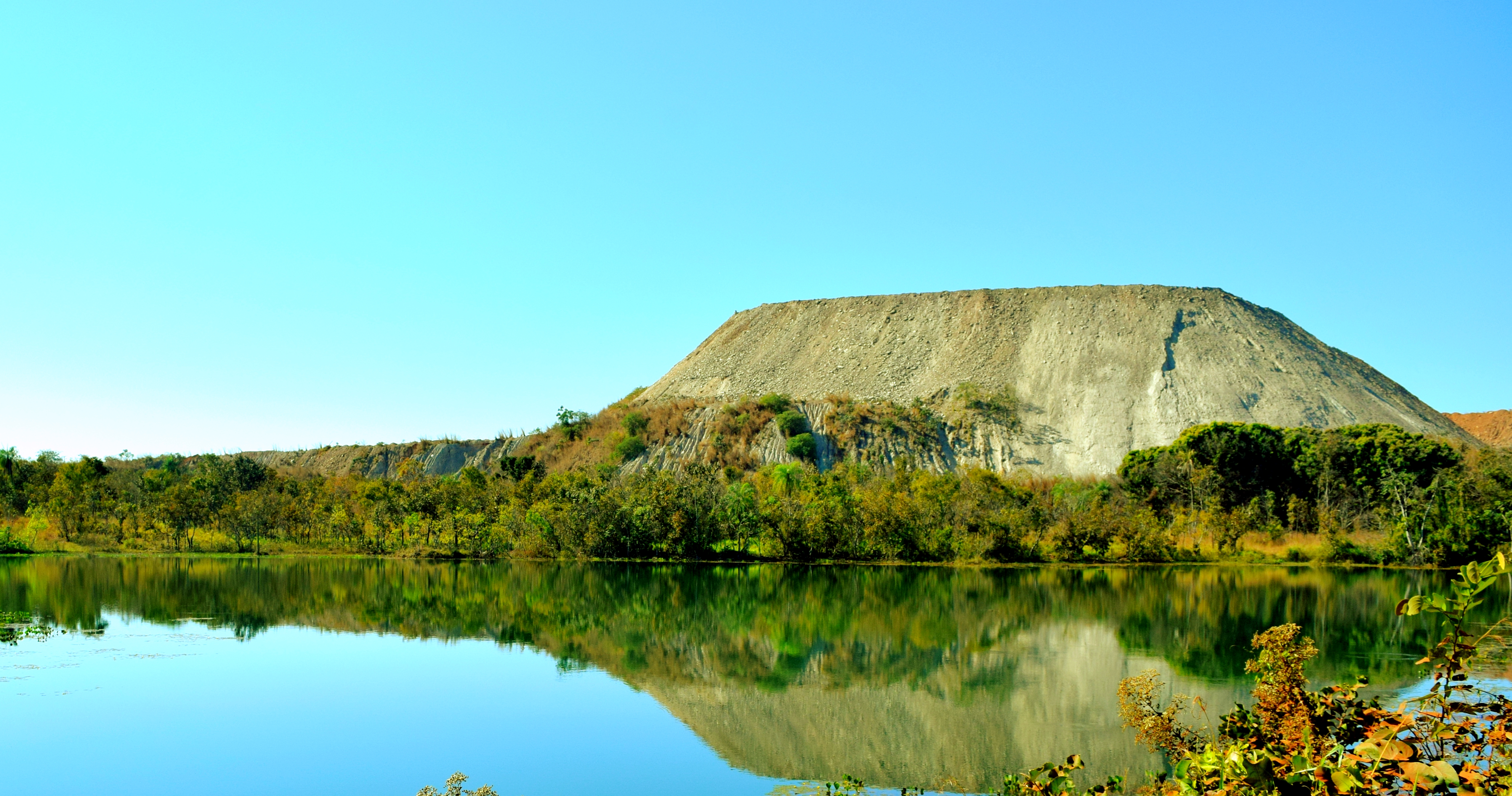
Gold production in the area of Pantanal.

In the mining sector, Brazil stands out in the extraction of iron ore (where it is the world's second largest exporter), copper, gold, bauxite (one of the 5 largest producers in the world), manganese (one of the 5 largest producers in the world), tin (one of the largest producers in the world), niobium (concentrates 98% of reserves known to the world) and nickel. In terms of gemstones, Brazil is the world's largest producer of amethyst, topaz, agate and one of the main producers of tourmaline, emerald, aquamarine, garnet and opal.

In 2019, Brazil's figures were as follows: it was the world's largest producer of niobium (88.9 thousand tons); the 2nd largest world producer of tantalum (430 tons); the 2nd largest world producer of iron ore (405 million tons); the 4th largest world producer of manganese (1.74 million tons); the 4th largest world producer of bauxite (34 million tons); the 4th largest world producer of vanadium (5.94 thousand tons); the 5th largest world producer of lithium (2.4 thousand tons); the 6th largest world producer of tin (14 thousand tons); the 8th largest world producer of nickel (60.6 thousand tons); the 8th largest world producer of phosphate (4.7 million tons); the 12th largest world producer of gold (90 tons); the 14th largest world producer of copper (360 thousand tons); the 14th largest world producer of titanium (25 thousand tons); the 13th largest world producer of gypsum (3 million tons); the 3rd largest world producer of graphite (96 thousand tons); the 21st largest world producer of sulfur (500 thousand tons); the 9th largest world producer of salt (7.4 million tons); besides having had a chromium production of 200 thousand tons.

Brazil holds the world's second-largest proven reserves of rare earth elements (approx. 21-22 million tonnes), after China. The industry is rapidly advancing with active projects like Serra Verde in Goiás, though it faces challenges with processing capacity and environmental concerns, particularly in regions with overlapping rural settlements.

=== Industrial ===
Industrial production
Main industries	textiles, shoes, chemicals, cement, lumber, iron ore, tin, steel, aircraft, armaments, motor vehicles and parts, other machinery and equipment
Industrial growth rate	1.1% (2018)
Labor force	13.3% of total labor force
GDP of sector	22.2% of total GDP

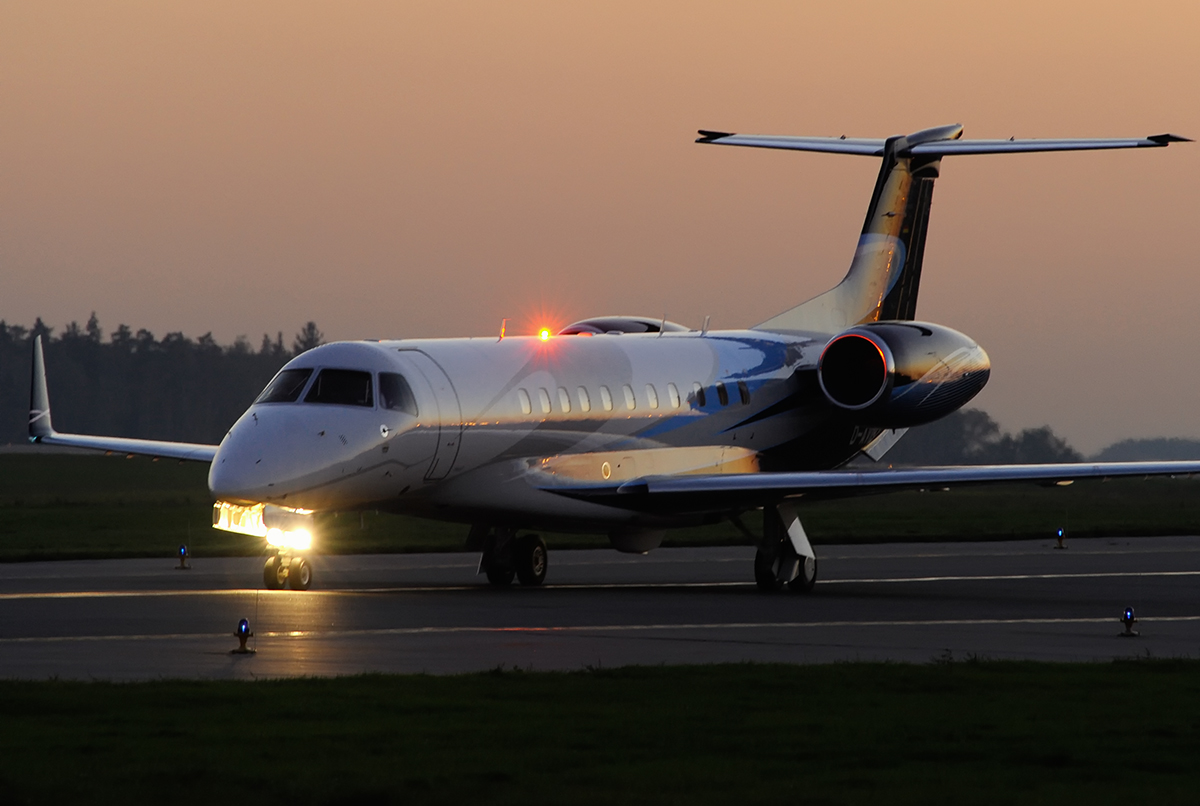
Embraer Legacy 600 jet manufactured by Embraer

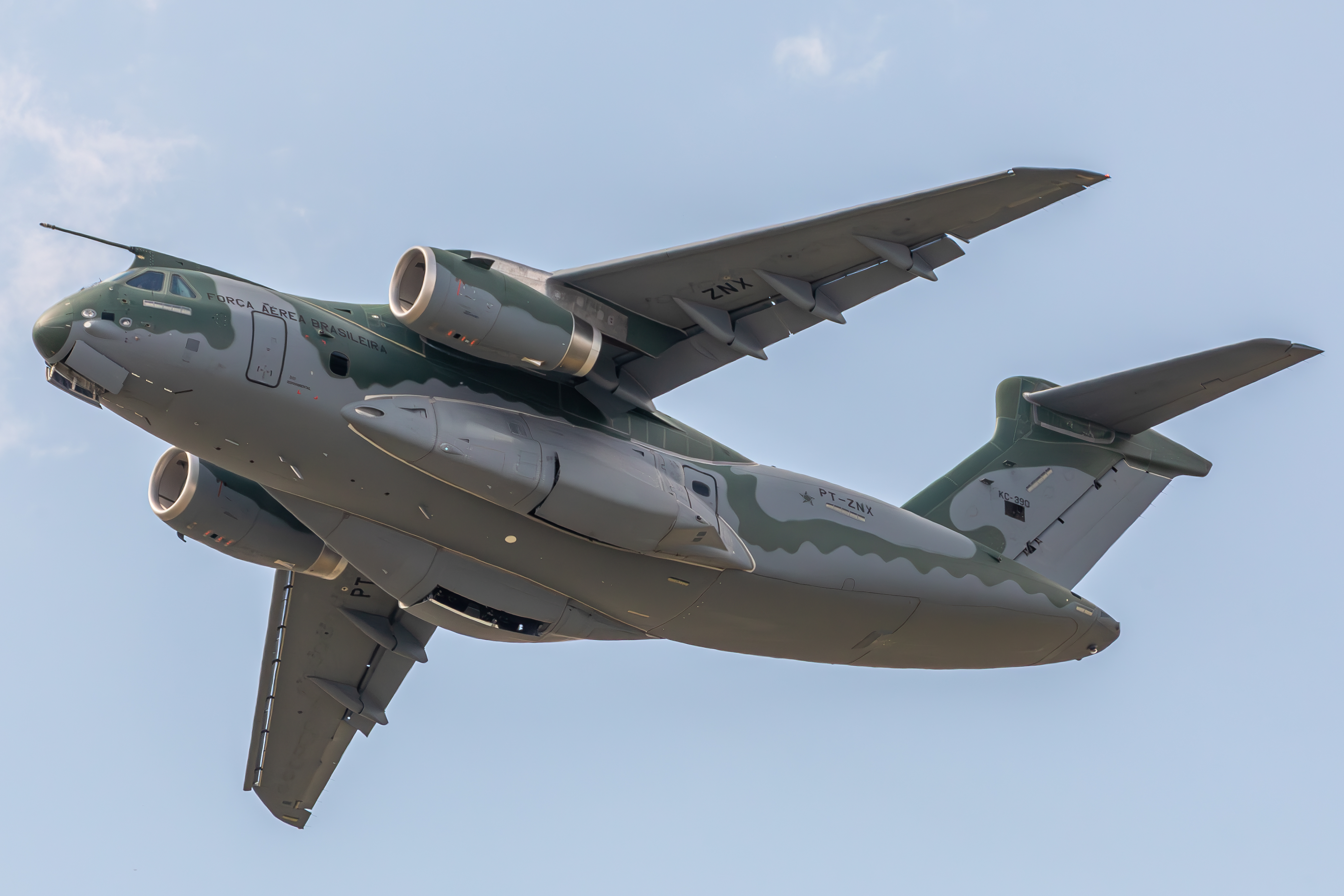
Embraer KC-390 military transport aircraft.

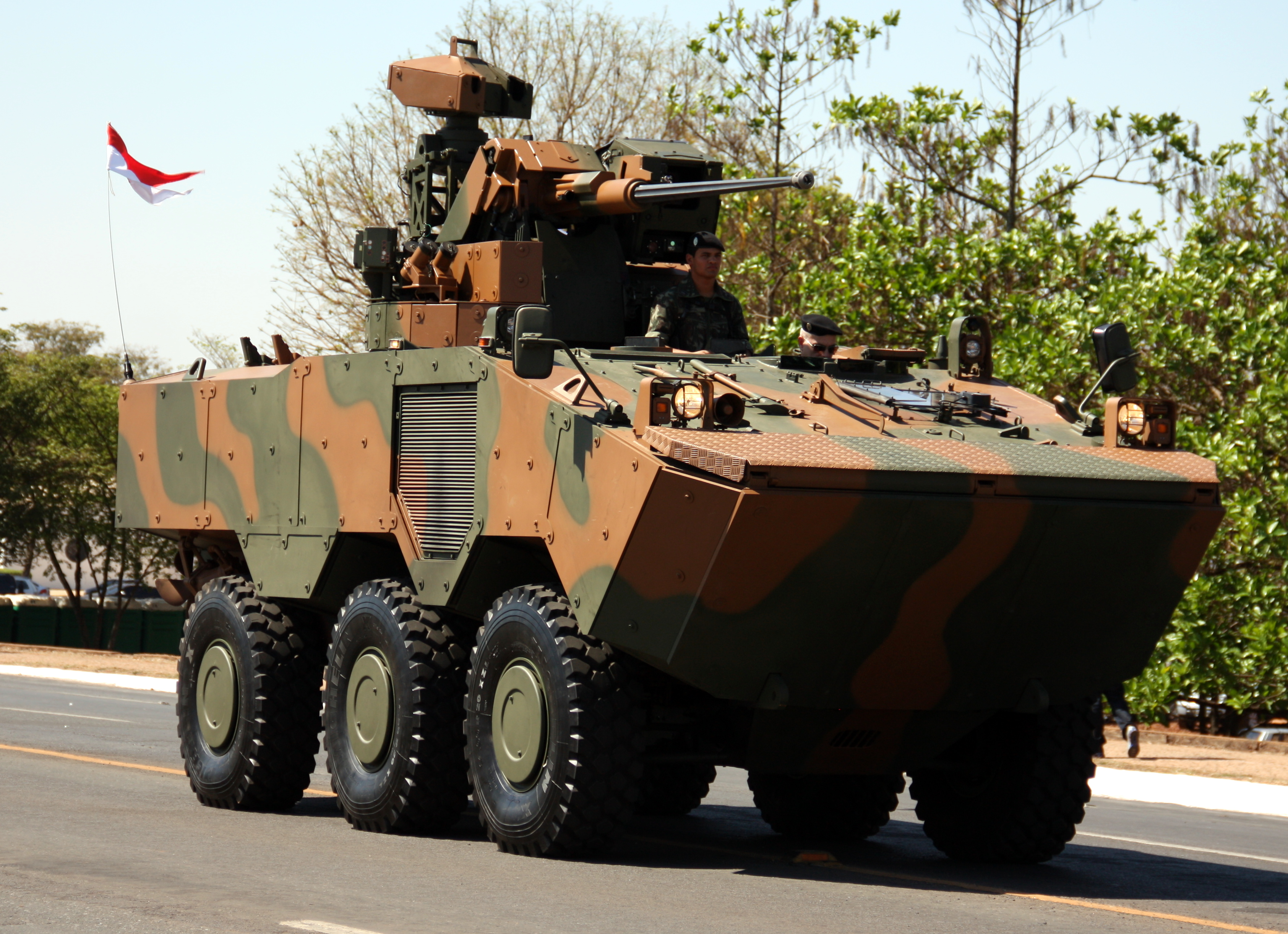
VBTP-MR Guarani armoured personnel carrier.

Brazil has the second-largest manufacturing sector in the Americas. Accounting for 28.5 percent of GDP, Brazil's industries range from automobiles, steel and petrochemicals to computers, aircraft, and consumer durables. With increased economic stability provided by the Plano Real, Brazilian and multinational businesses have invested heavily in new equipment and technology, a large proportion of which has been purchased from U.S. firms.

The World Bank lists the main producing countries each year, based on the total production value. According to the 2019 list, Brazil has the 13th most valuable industry in the world (US$173.6 billion). In the Americas, it is second only to the United States (2nd place) and Mexico (12th place). In the food industry, in 2019, Brazil was the second largest exporter of processed foods in the world. In 2016, the country was the 2nd largest producer of pulp in the world and the 8th producer of paper. In the footwear industry, in 2019, Brazil ranked 4th among world producers. In 2019, the country was the 8th producer of vehicles and the 9th producer of steel in the world. In 2018, the chemical industry of Brazil was the 8th in the world. In textile industry, Brazil, although it was among the 5 largest world producers in 2013, is very little integrated in world trade. In the aviation sector, Brazil has Embraer, the third largest aircraft manufacturer in the world, behind Boeing and Airbus.

Brazil holds the position of South America's top oil and gas producer with record output exceeding 4.89 million boe/d in early 2026, primarily driven by massive pre-salt, deep-water offshore projects. State-controlled company Petrobras dominates the sector.

Brazil is a global powerhouse in iron and steel production, ranking as the ninth-largest steel producer and second-largest iron ore exporter worldwide. With 33.3 billion tons of iron ore reserves, the industry is a key economic driver, centered in Minas Gerais and Rio de Janeiro, with major producers including Gerdau and CSN.

The Brazilian pharmaceutical market is a rapidly growing sector, valued at approximately US$38 billion in 2024 and projected to reach US$73.79 billion by 2032.

In the last years, the defence industry in Brazil achieved prominence with exports of more than US$1 billion per year and sales abroad of high-technology products like the transport jet Embraer C-390 Millennium, the Embraer EMB 314 Super Tucano, a light attack aircraft, the 6×6 armoured personnel carrier VBTP-MR Guarani and others armaments like pistols and rifles by the company Taurus Armas. Embraer is one of the world's top 100 defense contractors.

=== Service ===
Brazil has a large and diverse services sector.

==== Banking and finance ====
During the early 1990s, the banking sector accounted for as much as 16 percent of the GDP. Although undergoing a major overhaul, Brazil's financial services industry provides local businesses with a wide range of products and is attracting numerous new entrants, including U.S. financial firms. On 8 May 2008, the São Paulo Stock Exchange (Bovespa) and the São Paulo-based Brazilian Mercantile and Futures Exchange (BM&F) merged, creating BM&F Bovespa, one of the largest stock exchanges in the world. Also, the previously monopolistic reinsurance sector is being opened up to third-party companies.

==== Telecommunications ====
As of 31 December 2007, there were an estimated 21,304,000 broadband lines in Brazil. Over 75 percent of the broadband lines were via DSL and 10 percent via cable modems.

==== Creative Industries ====
The first study into the impact of the Creative Industries on the Brazilian economy was published by FIRJAN. The creative economy in Latin America was termed the "Orange Economy" in a publication released by the Inter-American Development Bank (IDB). This 2013 study valued Brazil's Orange Economy at US$66.87 billion providing 5,280,000 jobs and responsible for US$9.414 million in exports, with the value of creative exports being higher than the US$8.016 million value of coffee exports over the same period.

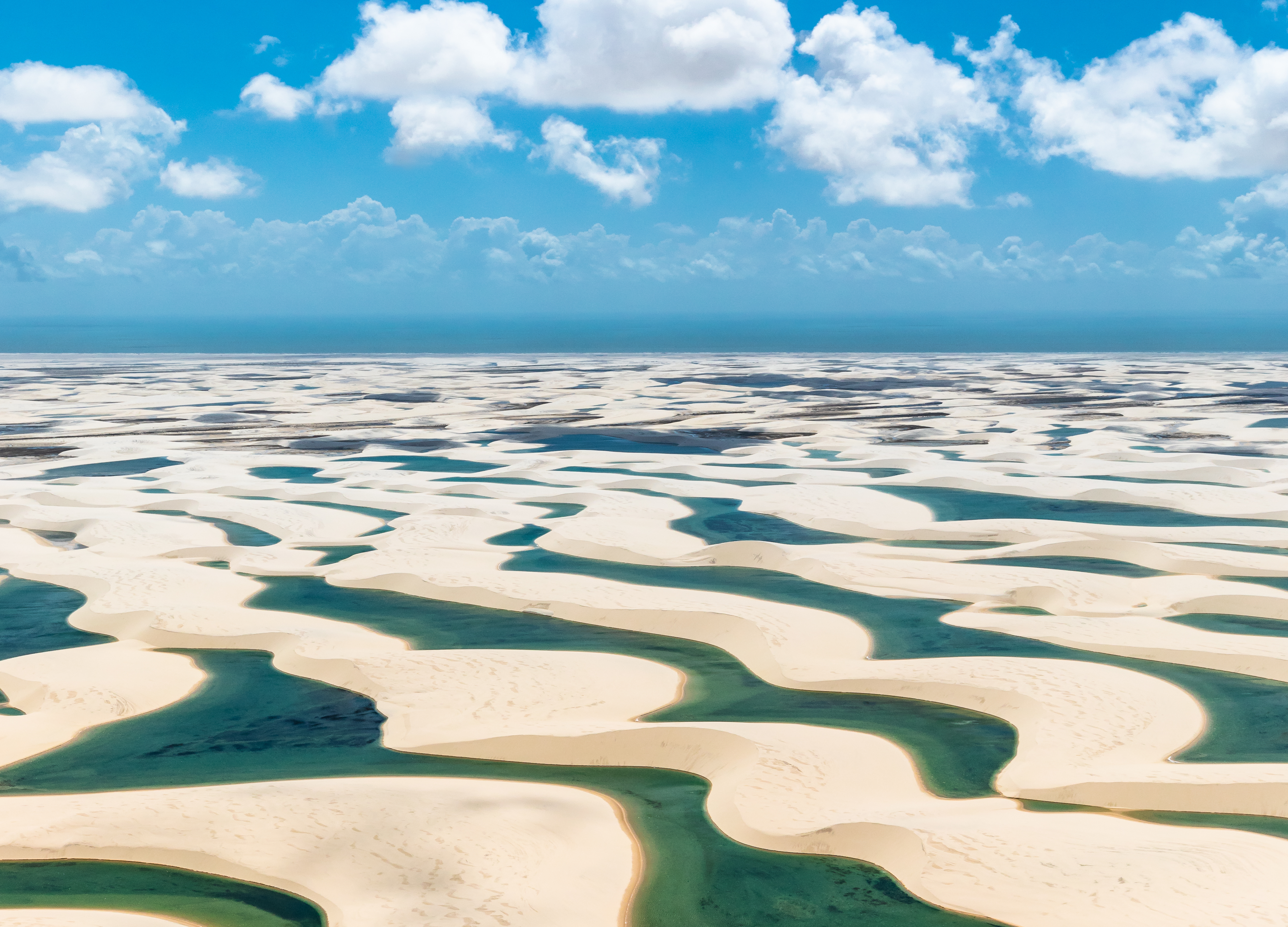
Lençóis Maranhenses.

A 2021 study into the Intellectual Property Intensive Sectors in the Brazilian Economy was undertaken as part of the National Strategy on Intellectual Property 2021–2030. The study found that 450 of the 673 economic classes could be classified as IP-intensive sectors that collectively employed 19.3 million people. The share of GDP between 2014 and 2016 across these economic classes amounted to R$2.1 trillion reais or 44.2% of GDP over this time.

==== Tourism ====
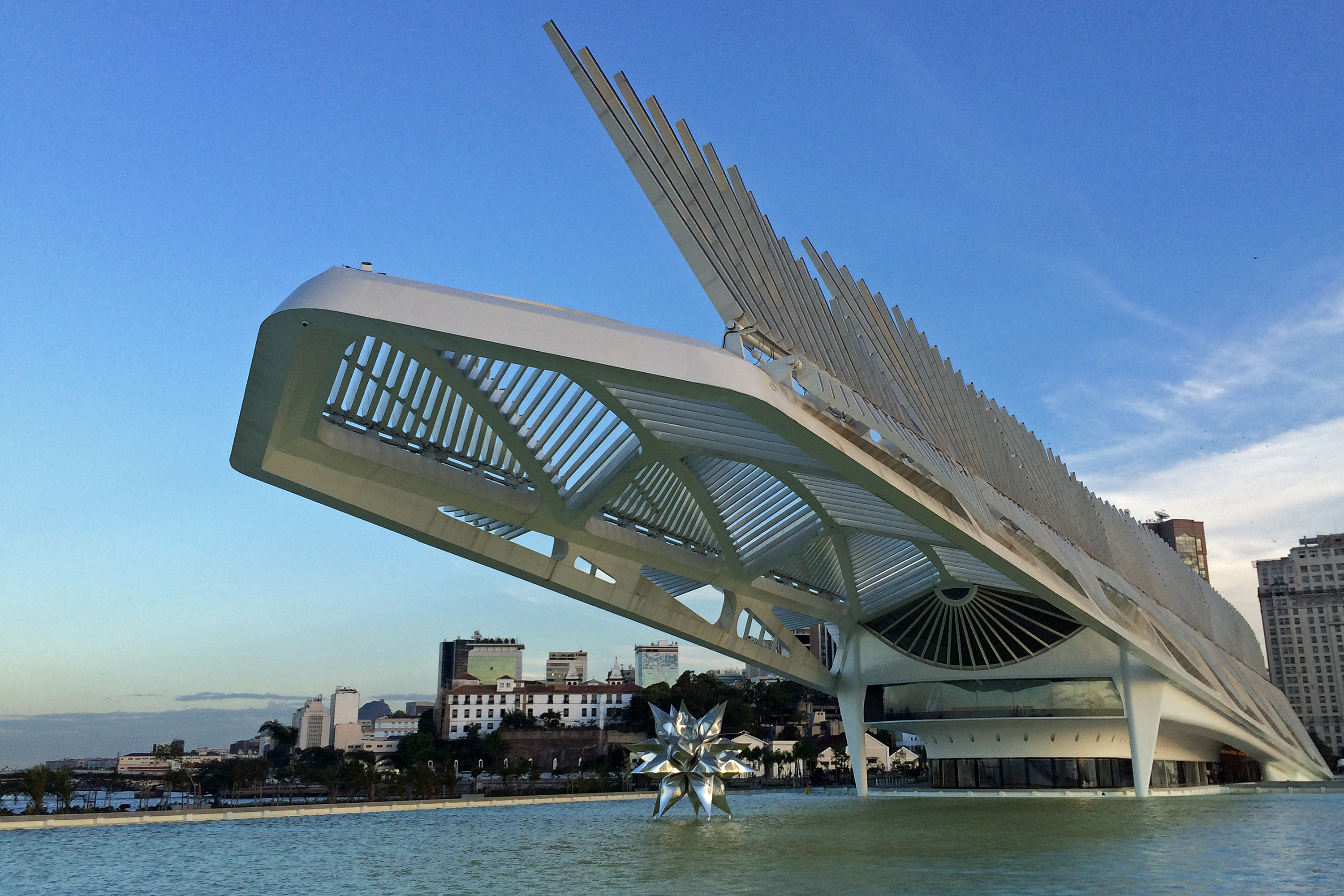
Museu do Amanhã, Rio de Janeiro.

In the list of world tourist destinations, in 2018, Brazil was the 48th most visited country, with 6.6 million tourists (and revenues of 5.9 billion dollars). Tourism in South America as a whole is still underdeveloped: in Europe, for example, countries obtain annual tourism figures like $73.7 billion (Spain), receiving 82.7 million tourists or 67.3 billion (France), receiving 89.4 million tourists. While Europe received 710 million tourists in 2018, Asia 347 million and North America 142.2 million, South America received only 37 million, Central America 10.8 million and the Caribbean 25.7 million.

=== Energy ===
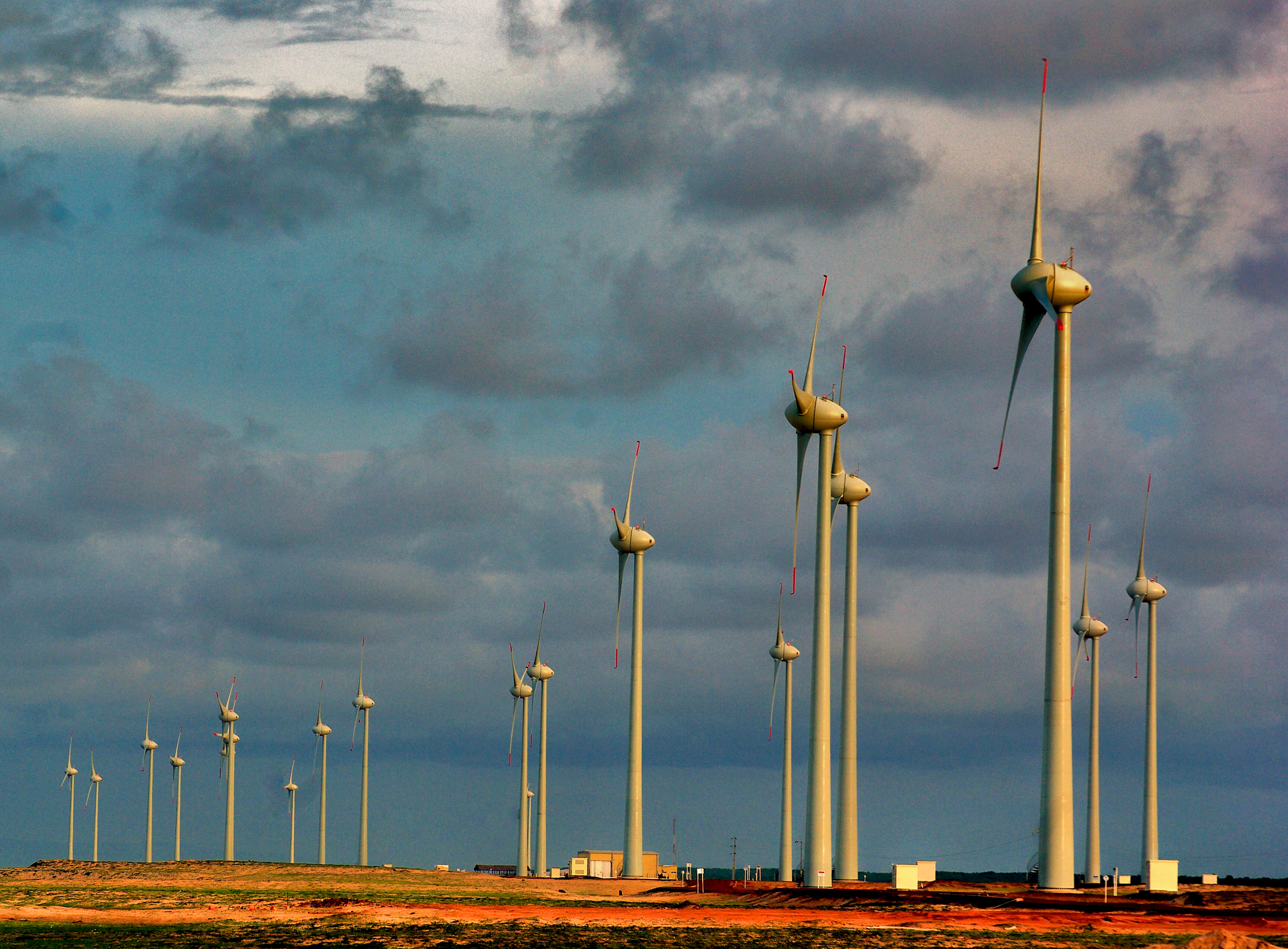
Wind power in Parnaíba.

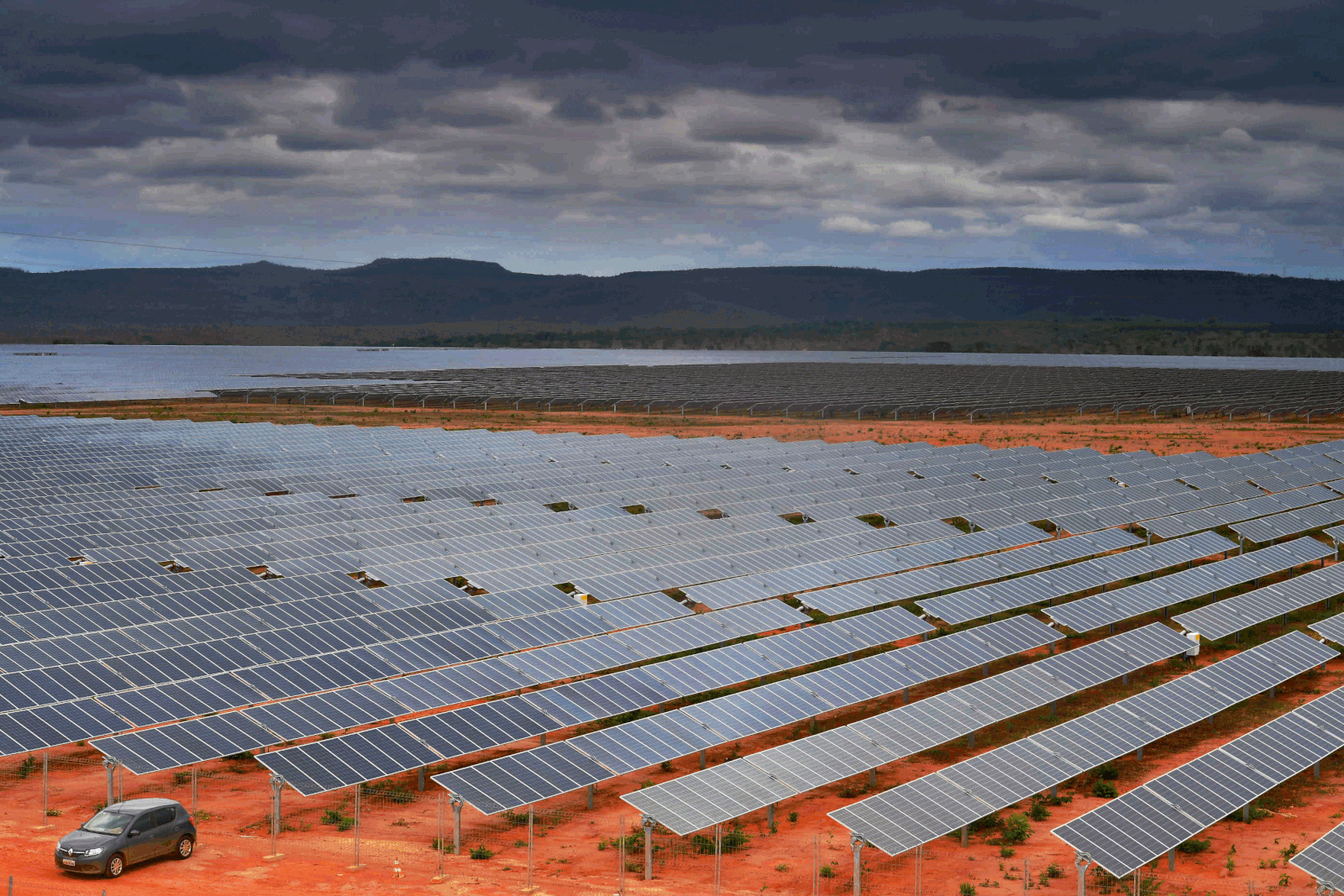
Pirapora Solar Complex, the largest in Brazil and Latin America, with a capacity of 321 MW.

The Brazilian government has undertaken an ambitious program to reduce dependence on imported petroleum. Imports previously accounted for more than 70% of the country's oil needs but Brazil became self-sufficient in oil in 2006–2007. Brazil was the 10th largest oil producer in the world in 2019, with 2.8 million barrels / day. Production manages to supply the country's demand. In the beginning of 2020, in the production of oil and natural gas, the country exceeded 4 million barrels of oil equivalent per day, for the first time. In January this year, 3.168 million barrels of oil per day and 138.753 million cubic meters of natural gas were extracted. Brazil joined the OPEC+ cartel in 2025.

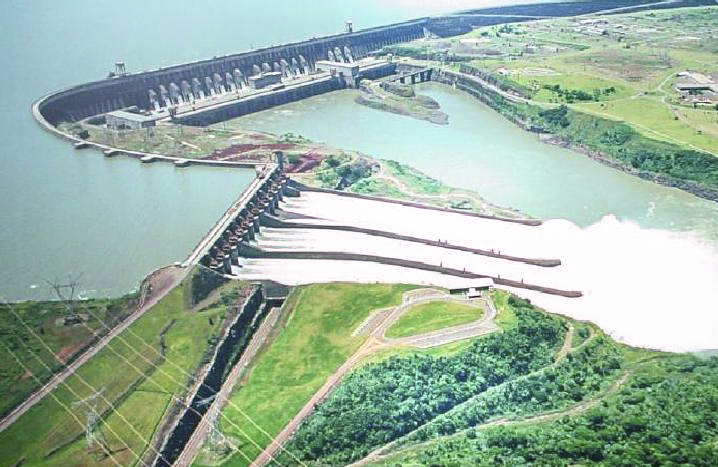
Itaipu Dam in Paraná.

Brazil is one of the main world producers of hydroelectric power. In 2019, Brazil had 217 hydroelectric plants in operation, with an installed capacity of 98,581 MW, 60.16% of the country's energy generation. In the total generation of electricity, in 2019 Brazil reached 170,000 megawatts of installed capacity, more than 75% from renewable sources (the majority, hydroelectric).

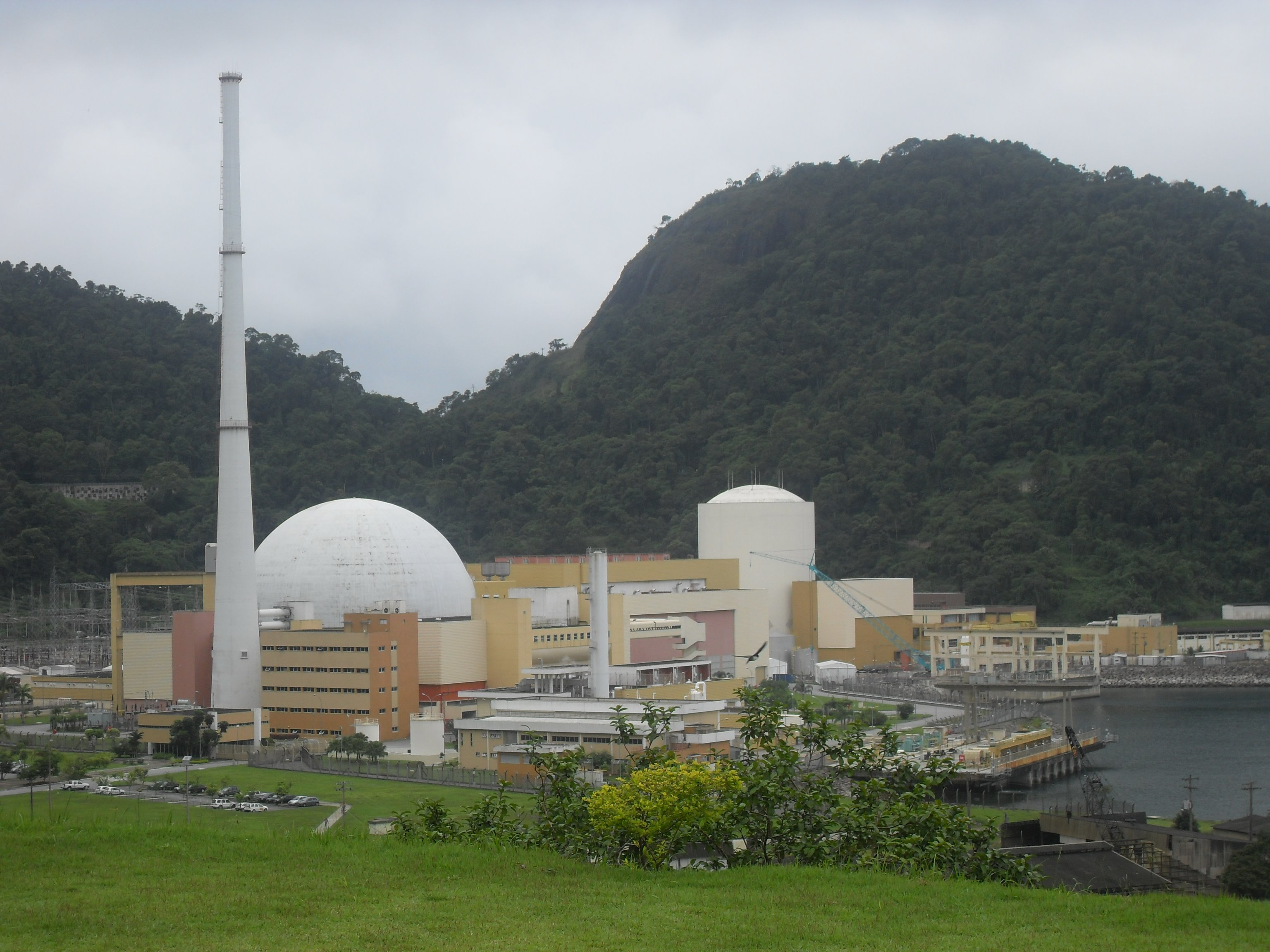
Angra Nuclear Power Plant in Angra dos Reis, Rio de Janeiro

In 2013, the Southeast Region used about 50% of the load of the National Integrated System (SIN), being the main energy consuming region in the country. The region's installed electricity generation capacity totaled almost 42,500 MW, which represented about a third of Brazil's generation capacity. The hydroelectric generation represented 58% of the region's installed capacity, with the remaining 42% corresponding basically to the thermoelectric generation. São Paulo accounted for 40% of this capacity; Minas Gerais by about 25%; Rio de Janeiro by 13.3%; and Espírito Santo accounted for the rest. The South Region owns the Itaipu Dam, which was the largest hydroelectric plant in the world for several years, until the inauguration of Three Gorges Dam in China. It remains the second largest operating hydroelectric in the world. Brazil is the co-owner of the Itaipu Plant with Paraguay: the dam is located on the Paraná River, located on the border between countries. It has an installed generation capacity of 14 GW for 20 generating units of 700 MW each. North Region has large hydroelectric plants, such as Belo Monte Dam and Tucuruí Dam, which produce much of the national energy. Brazil's hydroelectric potential has not yet been fully exploited, so the country still has the capacity to build several renewable energy plants in its territory.

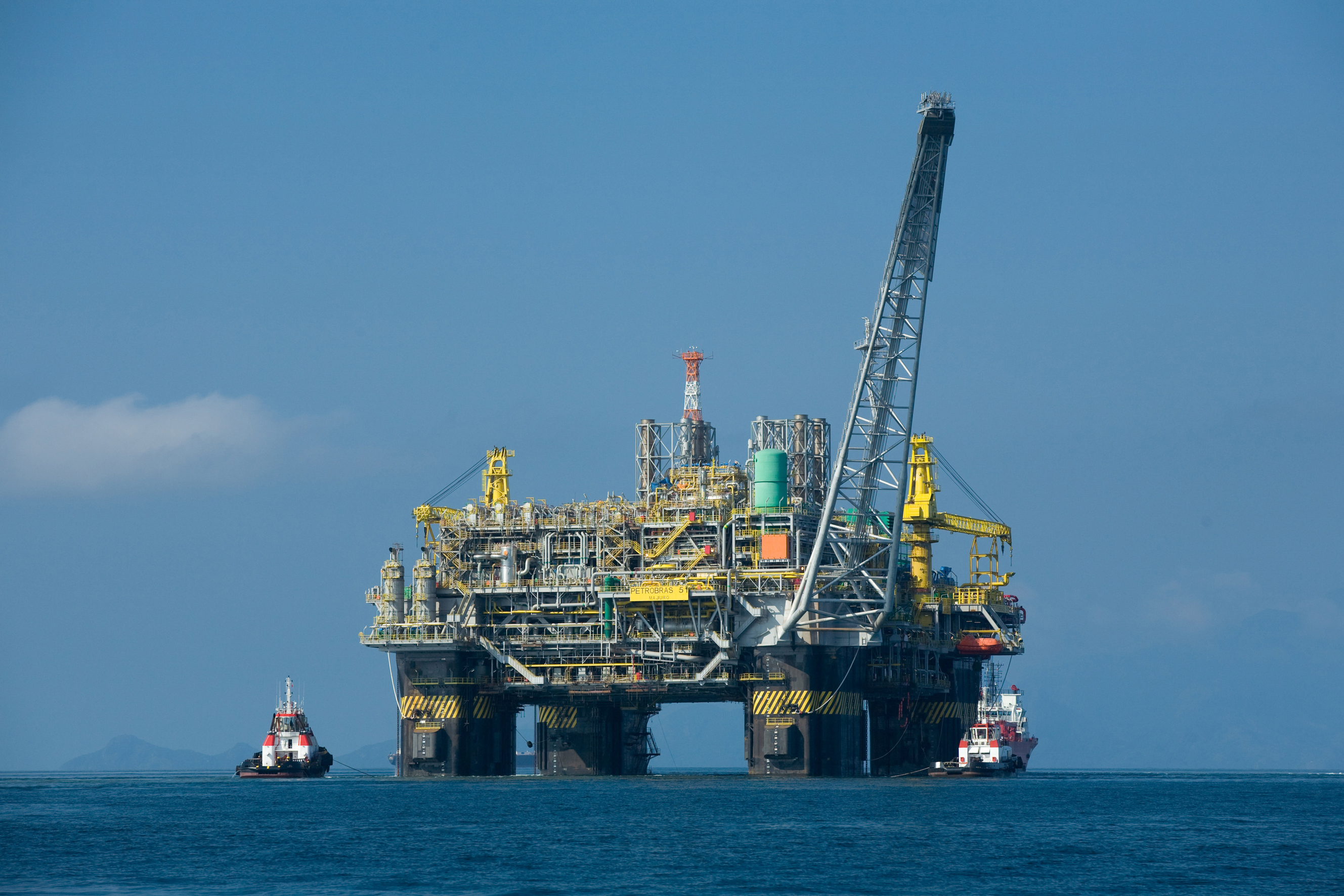
Oil platform P-51 of Petrobras.

As of July 2022, according to ONS, total installed capacity of wind power was 22 GW, with average capacity factor of 58%. While the world average wind production capacity factors is 24.7%, there are areas in Northern Brazil, specially in Bahia State, where some wind farms record with average capacity factors over 60%; the average capacity factor in the Northeast Region is 45% in the coast and 49% in the interior. In 2019, wind energy represented 9% of the energy generated in the country. In 2019, it was estimated that the country had an estimated wind power generation potential of around 522 GW (this, only onshore), enough energy to meet three times the country's current demand. In 2021 Brazil was the 7th country in the world in terms of installed wind power (21 GW), and the 4th largest producer of wind energy in the world (72 TWh), behind only China, USA and Germany.

Nuclear energy accounts for about 4% of Brazil's electricity. The nuclear power generation monopoly is owned by Eletronuclear (Eletrobrás Eletronuclear S/A), a wholly owned subsidiary of Eletrobrás. Nuclear energy is produced by two reactors at Angra. It is located at the Central Nuclear Almirante Álvaro Alberto (CNAAA) on the Praia de Itaorna in Angra dos Reis, Rio de Janeiro. It consists of two pressurized water reactors, Angra I, with capacity of 657 MW, connected to the power grid in 1982, and Angra II, with capacity of 1,350 MW, connected in 2000. A third reactor, Angra III, with a projected output of 1,350 MW, is planned to be finished.

As of October 2022, according to ONS, total installed capacity of photovoltaic solar was 21 GW, with average capacity factor of 23%. Some of the most irradiated Brazilian States are MG ("Minas Gerais"), BA ("Bahia") and GO (Goiás), which have indeed world irradiation level records. In 2019, solar power represented 1,27% of the energy generated in the country. In 2021, Brazil was the 14th country in the world in terms of installed solar power (13 GW), and the 11th largest producer of solar energy in the world (16.8 TWh).

In 2020, Brazil was also the 2nd largest country in the world in the production of energy through biomass (energy production from solid biofuels and renewable waste), with 15,2 GW installed.

Total energy consumption in Terrawatt-hours (TWh)
1970	1980	1990	2000	2010	2020	2023
453	▲1,153	▲1,566	▲2,357	▲3,185	▲3,394	▲3,854
Per capita energy consumption in Kilowatt-hours (KWh)
4,704	▲9,430	▲10,391	▲13,400	▲16,221	▼15,921	▲17,806
Oil production in Terrawatt-hours (TWh)
102	▲115	▲397	▲780	▲1,298	▲1,853	▲2,136

=== Transport ===
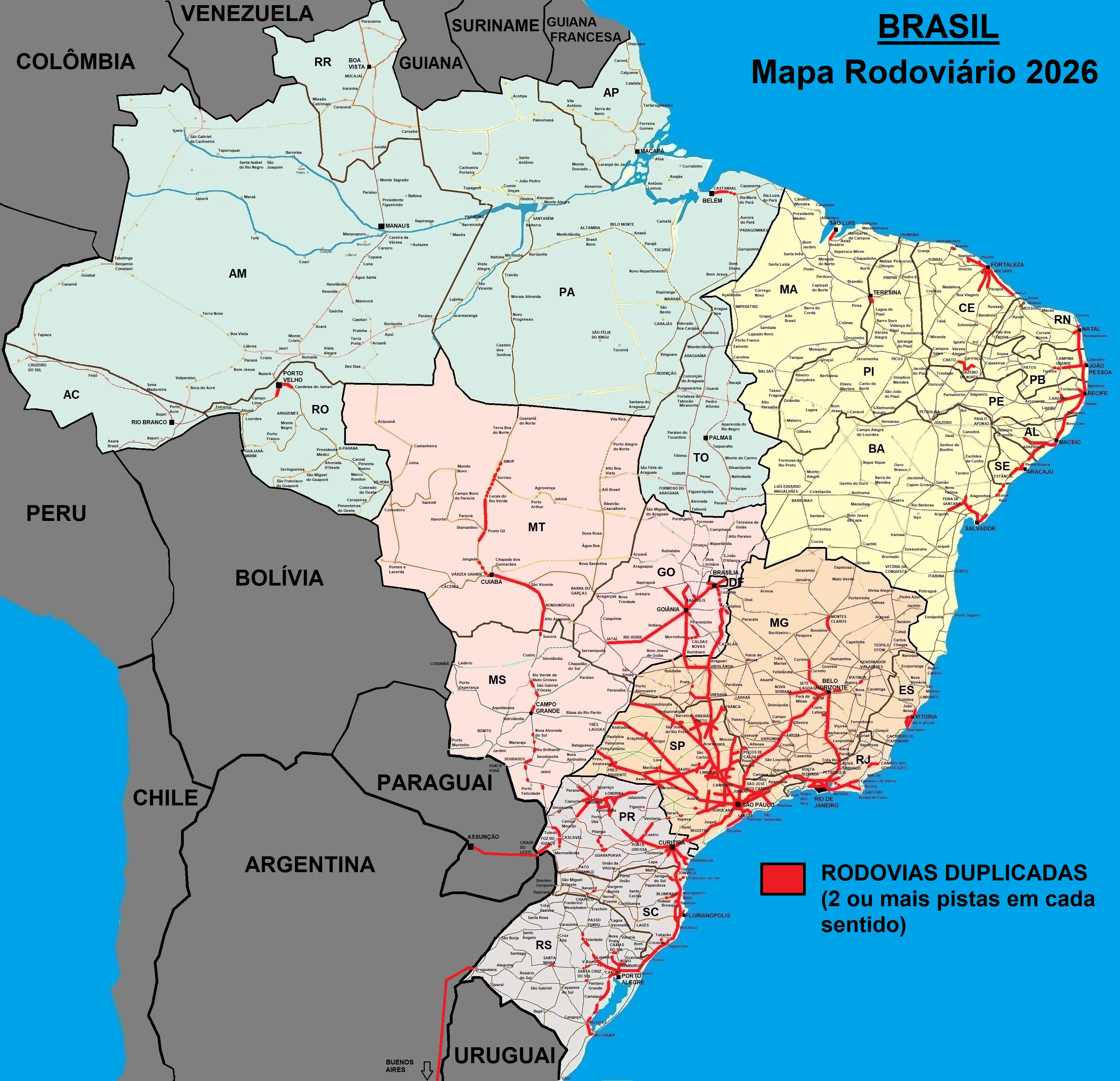
Road system in Brazil, with divided highways highlighted in red.

Transport in Brazil is basically carried out using the road mode, the most developed in the region. There is also a considerable infrastructure of ports and airports. The railway and fluvial sector, although it has potential, is usually treated in a secondary way.

Brazil has more than 1.7 million km of roads, of which 215,000 km are paved, and about 17,000 km are divided highways. The two most important highways in the country are BR-101 and BR-116. Due to the Andes Mountains, Amazon River and Amazon Forest, there have always been difficulties in implementing transcontinental or bioceanic highways. Practically the only route that existed was the one that connected Brazil to Buenos Aires, in Argentina and later to Santiago, in Chile. However, in recent years, with the combined effort of South American countries, new routes have started to emerge, such as Brazil-Peru (Interoceanic Highway), and a new highway between Brazil, Paraguay, northern Argentina and northern Chile (Bioceanic Corridor).

There are more than 2,000 airports in Brazil. The country has the second largest number of airports in the world, behind only the United States. São Paulo International Airport, located in the Metropolitan Region of São Paulo, is the largest and busiest in the country – the airport connects São Paulo to practically all major cities around the world. Brazil has 44 international airports, such as those in Rio de Janeiro, Brasília, Belo Horizonte, Porto Alegre, Florianópolis, Cuiabá, Salvador, Recife, Fortaleza, Belém and Manaus, among others. The 10 busiest airports in South America in 2017 were: São Paulo-Guarulhos (Brazil), Bogotá (Colombia), São Paulo-Congonhas (Brazil), Santiago (Chile), Lima (Peru), Brasília (Brazil), Rio de Janeiro (Brazil), Buenos Aires-Aeroparque (Argentina), Buenos Aires-Ezeiza (Argentina), and Minas Gerais (Brazil).

About ports, Brazil has some of the busiest ports in South America, such as Port of Santos, Port of Rio de Janeiro, Port of Paranaguá, Port of Itajaí, Port of Rio Grande, Port of São Francisco do Sul and Suape Port. The 15 busiest ports in South America are: Port of Santos (Brazil), Port of Bahia de Cartagena (Colombia), Callao (Peru), Guayaquil (Ecuador), Buenos Aires (Argentina), San Antonio (Chile), Buenaventura (Colombia), Itajaí (Brazil), Valparaíso (Chile), Montevideo (Uruguay), Paranaguá (Brazil), Rio Grande (Brazil), São Francisco do Sul (Brazil), Manaus (Brazil) and Coronel (Chile).

The Brazilian railway network has an extension of about 30,000 kilometers. It is basically used for transporting ores.

Among the main Brazilian waterways, two stand out: Hidrovia Tietê-Paraná (which has a length of 2,400 km, 1,600 on the Paraná River and 800 km on the Tietê River, draining agricultural production from the states of Mato Grosso, Mato Grosso do Sul, Goiás and part of Rondônia, Tocantins and Minas Gerais) and Hidrovia do Solimões-Amazonas (it has two sections: Solimões, which extends from Tabatinga to Manaus, with approximately 1600 km, and Amazonas, which extends from Manaus to Belém, with 1650 km.

Almost entirely passenger transport from the Amazon basin is done by this waterway, in addition to practically all cargo transportation that is directed to the major regional centers of Belém and Manaus). In Brazil, this transport is still underutilized: the most important waterway stretches, from an economic point of view, are found in the Southeast and South of the country. Its full use still depends on the construction of locks, major dredging works and, mainly, of ports that allow intermodal integration.

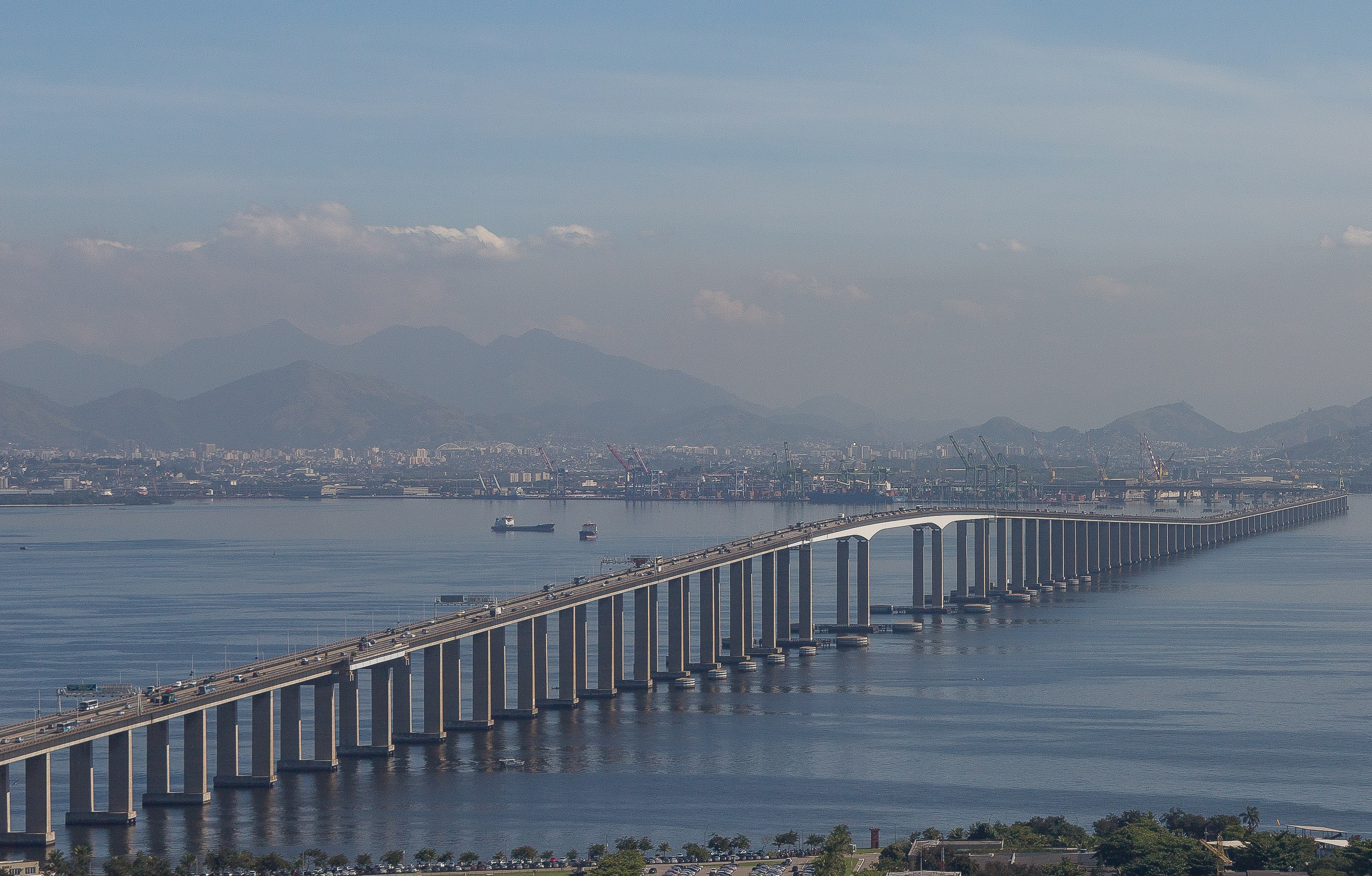
Rio–Niterói Bridge

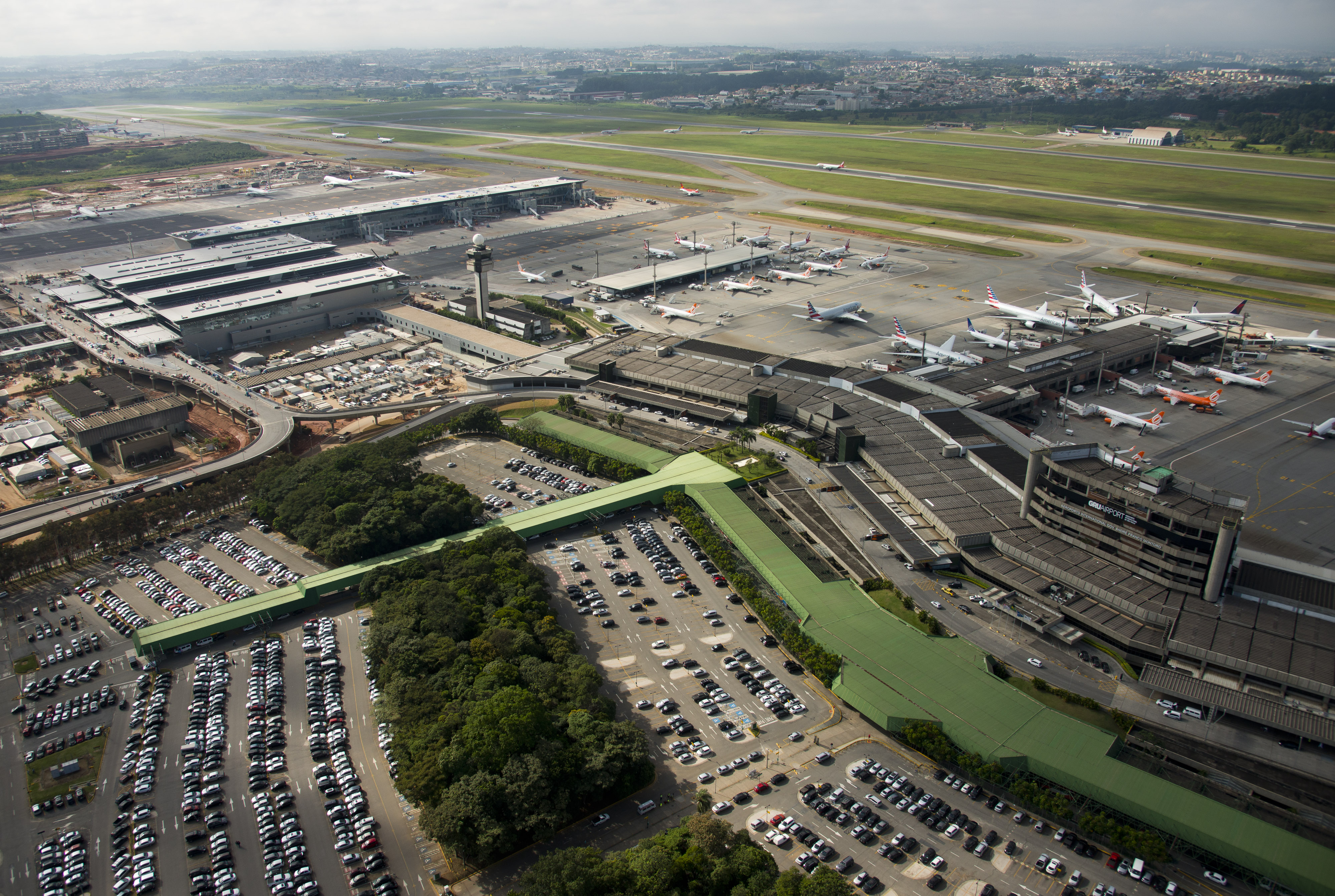
The São Paulo–Guarulhos International Airport is connected with the São Paulo Metro.

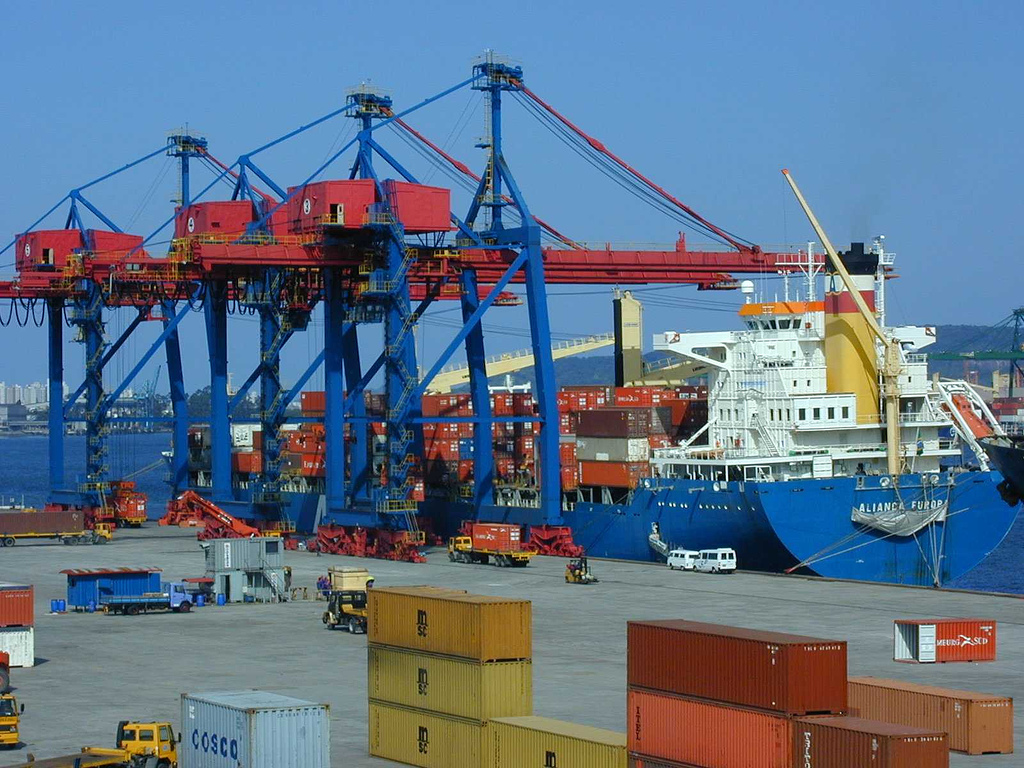
Port of Santos, one of the 40 largest and busiest ports in the world.

== Science and technology ==
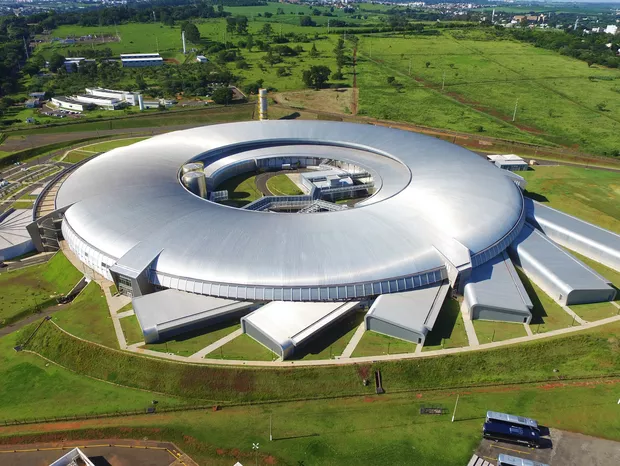
Laboratório Nacional de Luz Síncrotron in the city of Campinas

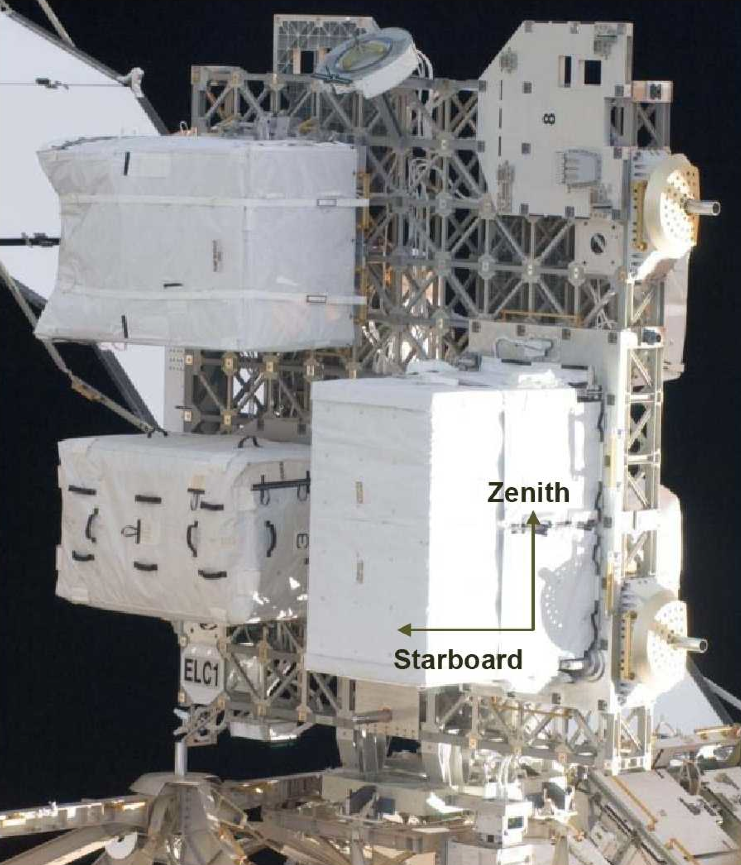
ExPRESS Logistics Carrier, a part-Brazilian made component on the International Space Station

Science and technology in Brazil has entered the international arena in recent decades. The central agency for science and technology in Brazil is the Ministry of Science and Technology, which includes the CNPq and Finep. This ministry also has a direct supervision over the National Institute for Space Research (Portuguese: Instituto Nacional de Pesquisas Espaciais — INPE), the National Institute of Amazonian Research (Portuguese: Instituto Nacional de Pesquisas da Amazônia — INPA), and the National Institute of Technology (Brazil) (Portuguese: Instituto Nacional de Tecnologia — INT). The ministry is also responsible for the Secretariat for Computer and Automation Policy (Portuguese: Secretaria de Política de Informática e Automação — SPIA), which is the successor of the SEI. The Ministry of Science and Technology, which the Sarney government created in March 1985, was headed initially by a person associated with the nationalist ideologies of the past. Although the new minister was able to raise the budget for the science and technology sector, he remained isolated within the government and had no influence on policy making for the economy.

With the new ministry, the science and technology agencies increased in size but lost some of their former independence and flexibility, and they became more susceptible to patronage politics. Most of the resources of the CNPq were channeled to fellowship programs procedures for quality control and no mechanisms to make the fellows active in the country's science and technology institutions. New groups competed for resources and control of the country's agencies of science, technology, and higher education. These groups included political parties, unionized university professors and employees, scientific societies, and special interest groups within the scientific and technological community. The SBPC (Brazilian Society for Scientific Development) shed its image as a semi-autonomous association of scientists to become an active lobbyist for more public resources and the protection of national technology from international competition. Brazil was ranked 52nd in the Global Innovation Index in 2025, up from 66th in 2019.

== Exports and imports ==
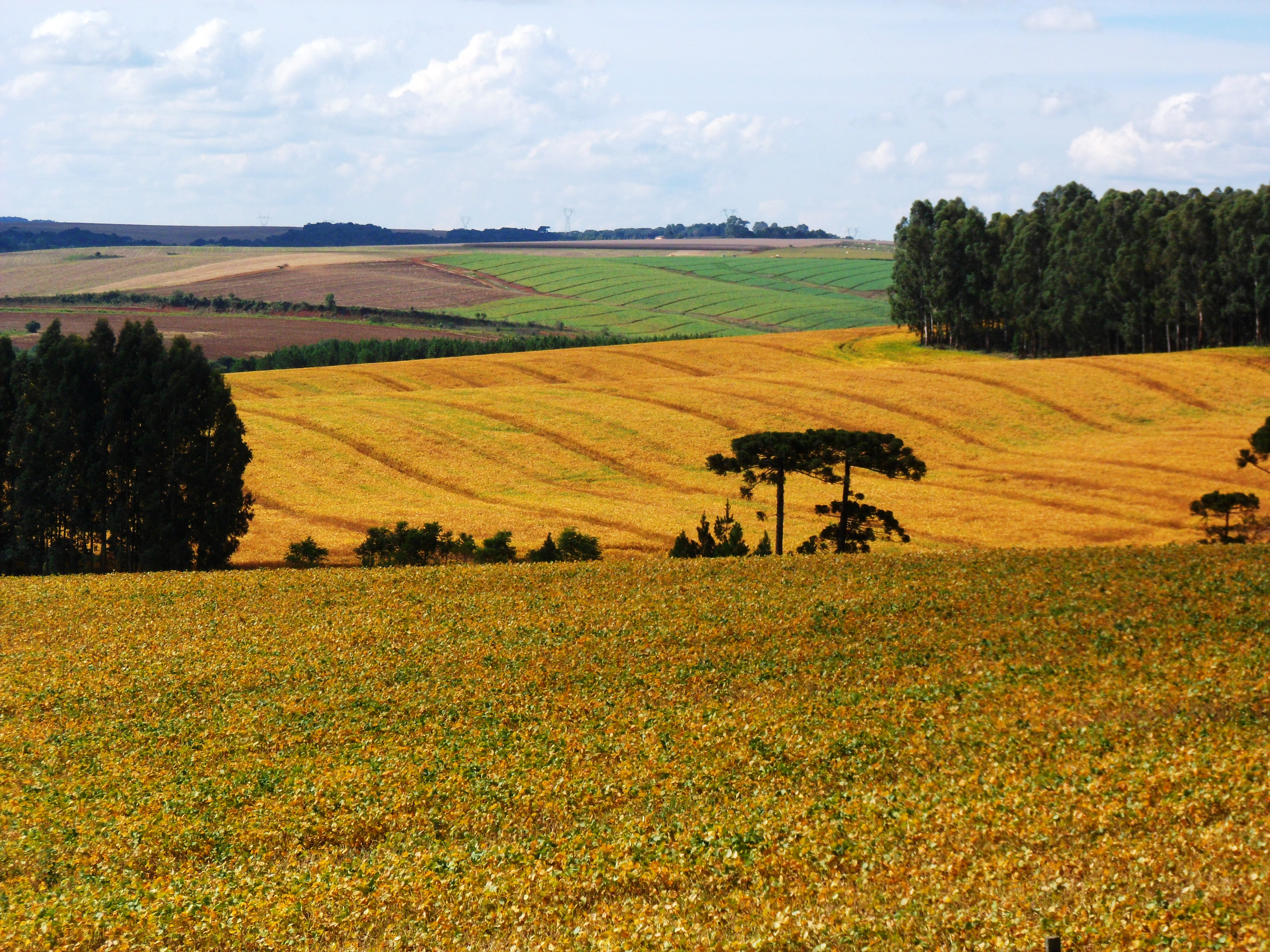
Brazil is the largest producer and exporter of soybeans in the world. Farm in Southern Brazil.

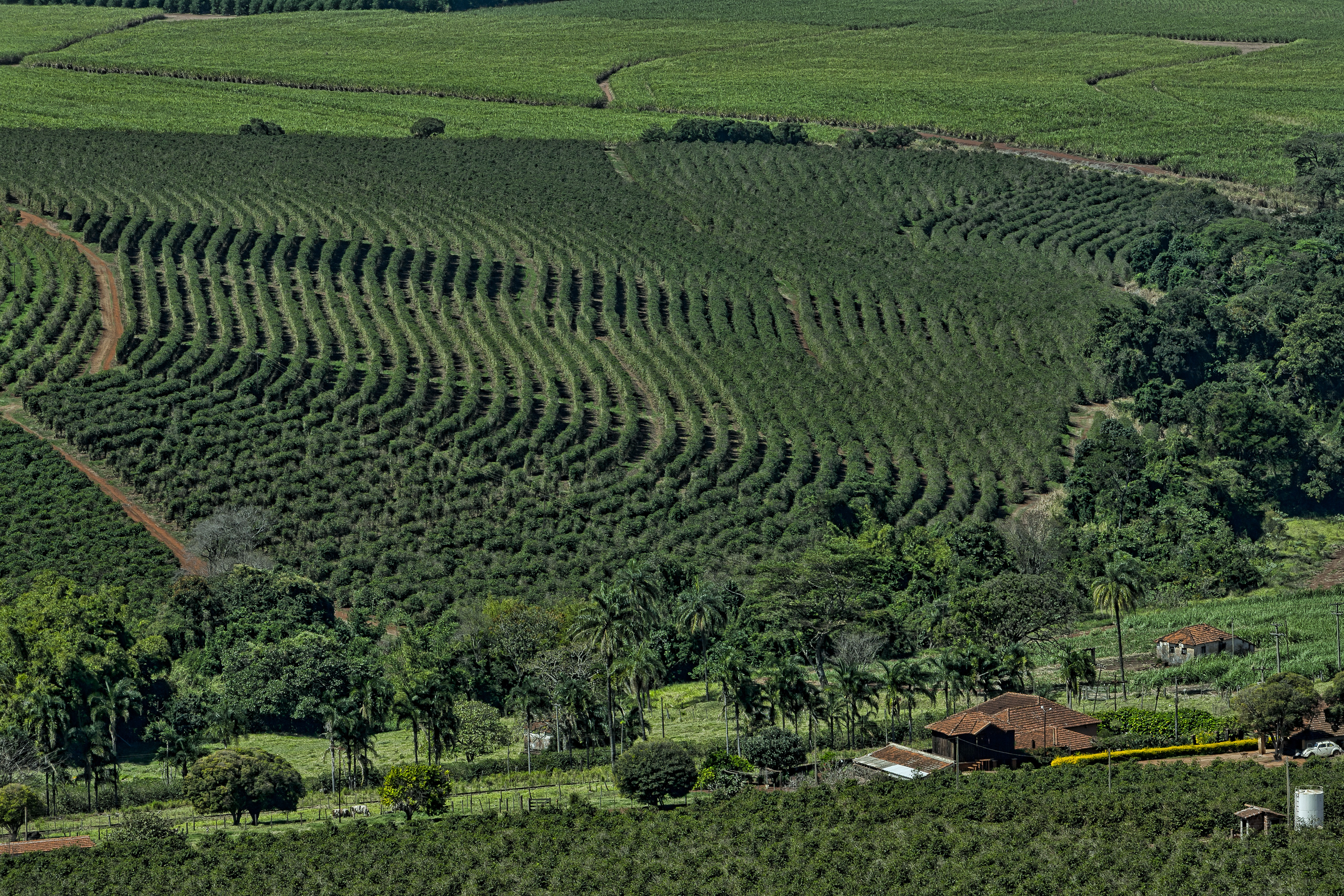
Brazil is the largest producer and exporter of coffee in the world. Brazilian coffee farmer producing.

=== Trade statistics ===
Year	Goods exports (billion US$)	Goods imports (in billion US$)	Net trade (in billion US$)
2023	▲$343.8	▲$241.5	▲$92.8
2020	▲$210.7	▲$175.0	▲$35.7
2015	▼$189.9	▼$172.5	▲$17.4
2010	▲$201.2	▲$182.8	▲$18.4
2000	▲$55.2	▲$57.0	▼−$1.8
1990	▲$31.4	▲$20.7	▲$10.8
1980	$20.1	$23.0	▼−$2.8

=== Products ===
Brazil was the 25th largest exporter in the world in 2020, with 1.1% of the global total.

In 2021, Brazil exported US$280.4 billion and imported US$219.4 billion, with a surplus of US$61 billion.

The country's top ten export products were:

- Iron ore: US$42.2 billion
- Soy: US$37.3 billion
- Crude petroleum oils: US$27.4 billion
- Sugar: US$8.5 billion
- Beef: US$7.4 billion
- Soybean meal: US$7.2 billion
- Petroleum fuel oils: US$6.6 billion
- Manufacturing Industry: US$6.4 billion
- Chicken meat: US$6.3 billion
- Cellulose: US$6.1 billion

The country also exports maize, coffee, cotton, tobacco, orange juice, footwear, airplanes, helicopters, cars, vehicle parts, gold, ethanol, semi-finished iron, among others.

=== Exports ===
Exports of Brazil by product category (2019) Chemical products Transportation Machines Mineral products Plastics and rubbers Metals Foodstuffs Precious metals Textiles Instruments Animal products Vegetable products Paper goods Footwear and headwear Miscellaneous Stone and glass Wood products Animal and vegetable bi-products Animal hides Arts and antiques Weapons

The main countries to which Brazil exports in 2021 were:

- China: US$87.6 billion (31.28%)
- United States: US$31.1 billion (11.09%)
- Argentina: US$11.8 billion (4.24%)
- Netherlands: US$9.3 billion (3.32%)
- Chile: US$6.9 billion (2.50%)
- Singapore: US$5.8 billion (2.10%)
- Mexico: US$5.5 billion (1.98%)
- Germany: US$5.5 billion (1.97%)
- Japan: US$5.5 billion (1.97%)
- Spain: US$5.4 billion (1.94%)

The country's export model, until today, is excessively based on exports of basic or semi-manufactured products, generating criticism, since such model generates little monetary value, which prevents further growth in the country in the long run. There are several factors that cause this problem, the main ones being: the excessive collection of taxes on production (due to the country's economic and legislative model being based on state capitalism and not on Free-Market Capitalism), the lack or deficiency of infrastructure (means of transport such as roads, railways and ports that are insufficient or weak for the country's needs, bad logistics and excessive bureaucracy) for export, high production costs (expensive energy, expensive fuel, expensive maintenance of trucks, expensive loan rates and bank financing for production, expensive export rates), the lack of an industrial policy, the lack of focus on adding value, the lack of aggressiveness in international negotiations, in addition to abusive tariff barriers imposed by other countries on the country's exports. Because of this, Brazil has never been very prominent in international trade.

Due to its size and potential, it would be able to be among the 10 largest exporters in the world, however, its participation in global commercial transactions usually oscillates between 0.5 and 2% only. In 2019, among the ten products that Brazil exports the most and that generate the most value, eight come from the agribusiness. Although still modest, the country's exports have evolved, and today they are more diversified than they were in the past. At the beginning of the 20th century, 70% of Brazilian exports were restricted to coffee. Overall, however, global trade still concentrates its few exports on low-tech products (mainly agricultural and mineral commodities) and, therefore, with low added value.

=== Imports ===
The main countries from which Brazil imports in 2021 were:

- China: US$47.6 billion (21.72%)
- United States: US$39.3 billion (17.95%)
- Argentina: US$11.9 billion (5.45%)
- Germany: US$11.3 billion (5.17%)
- India: US$6.7 billion (3.07%)
- Russia: US$5.7 billion (2.60%)
- Italy: US$5.4 billion (2.50%)
- Japan: US$5.1 billion (2.35%)
- South Korea: US$5.1 billion (2.33%)
- France: US$4.8 billion (2.19%)

== Economic status ==
Statistical table
Inflation (IPCA)
2002	12.53%
2003	9.30%
2004	7.60%
2005	5.69%
2006	3.14%
2007	4.46%
2008	5.91%
2009	4.31%
2010	5.90%
2011	6.50%
2012	5.84%
2013	5.91%
2014	6.41%
2015	10.67%
2016	6.29%
2017	2.95%
2018	3.75%
2019	4.31%
2020	4.52%
2021	10.06%
2022	5.79%
Average GDP growth rate 1950–2029
1950–59	7.1%
1960–69	6.1%
1970–79	8.9%
1980–89	3.0%
1990–99	1.7%
2000–09	3.3%
2010–19	1.4%
2020-29	2.3%

=== Sustainable growth ===
Portuguese explorers arrived in 1500, but it was only in 1808 that Brazil obtained a permit from the Portuguese colonial government to set up its first factories and manufacturers. In the 21st century, Brazil became the eighth largest economy in the world. Originally, its exports were basic raw and primary goods, such as sugar, rubber and gold. Today, 84% of exports are of manufactured and semi-manufactured products.

The period of great economic transformation and growth occurred between 1875 and 1975.

In the last decade, domestic production increased by 32.3%. Agribusiness (agriculture and cattle-raising), which grew by 47% or 3.6% per year, was the most dynamic sector – even after having weathered international crises that demanded constant adjustments to the Brazilian economy. The Brazilian government also launched a program for economic development acceleration called Programa de Aceleração do Crescimento, aiming to spur growth.

Brazil's transparency rank in the international world is 75th according to Transparency International.

=== Control and reform policies ===
Among measures recently adopted to balance the economy, Brazil carried out reforms to its social security (state and retirement pensions) and tax systems. These changes brought with them a noteworthy addition: a Law of Fiscal Responsibility which controls public expenditure by the executive branches at federal, state and municipal levels. At the same time, investments were made towards administration efficiency and policies were created to encourage exports, industry and trade, thus creating "windows of opportunity" for local and international investors and producers.

With these alterations in place, Brazil has reduced its vulnerability: it does not import the oil it consumes; it has halved its domestic debt through exchange rate-linked certificates and has seen exports grow, on average, by 20% a year. The exchange rate does not put pressure on the industrial sector or inflation (at 4% a year), and does away with the possibility of a liquidity crisis. As a result, the country, after 12 years, has achieved a positive balance in the accounts which measure exports/imports, plus interest payments, services and overseas payment. Thus, respected economists say that the country will not be deeply affected by the current world economic crisis.

In 2017, President Michel Temer refused to make public the list of companies accused of "modern slavery". The list, made public yearly since the presidency of Luís Inácio Lula da Silva in 2003, was intended to persuade companies to settle their fines and conform to labor regulations, in a country where corruption of the political class risked compromising respect for the law. The relations of the president-in-office with the "landowner lobby" were denounced by dismissed President Dilma Rousseff on this occasion.

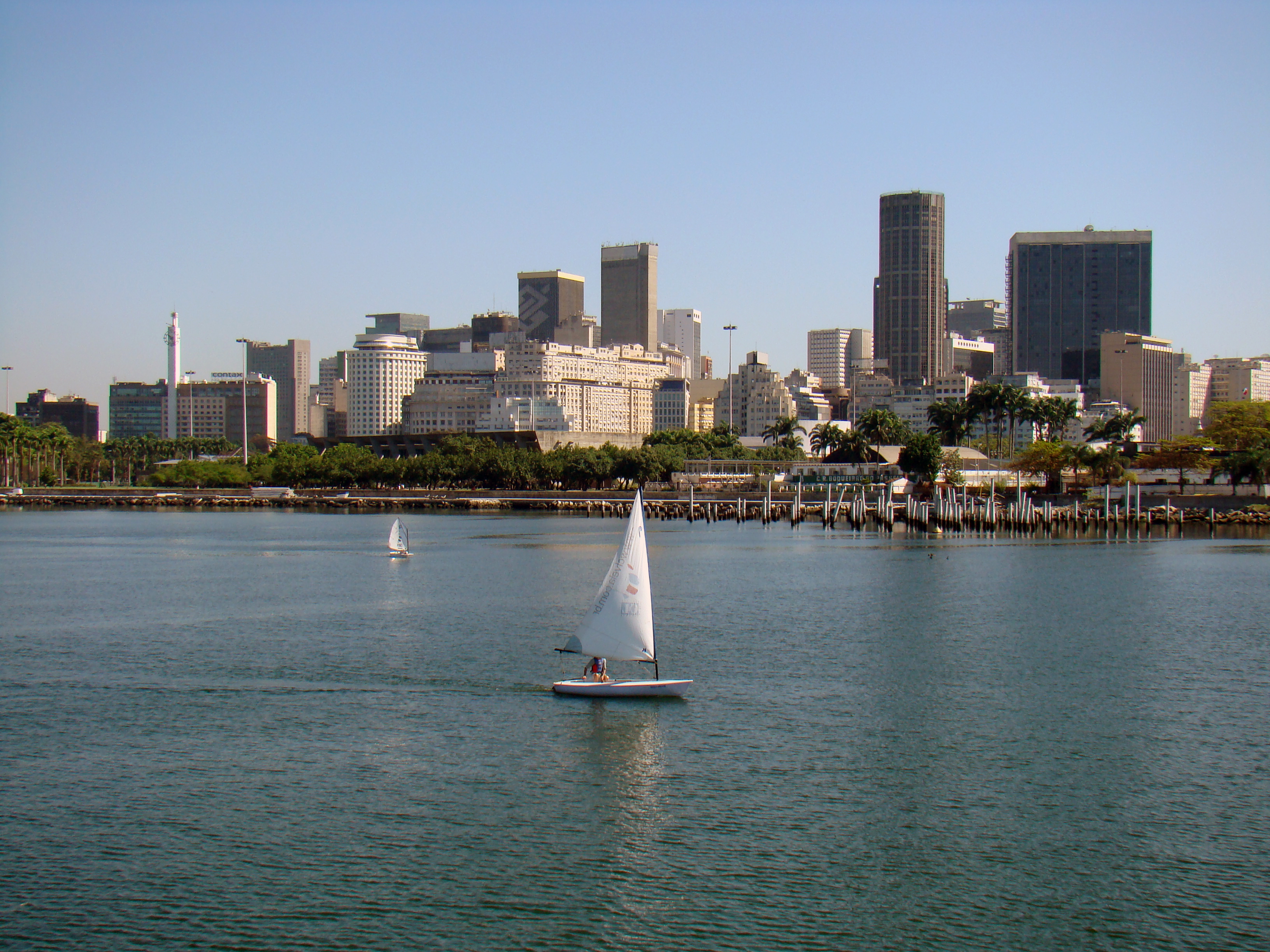
Central business district of Rio de Janeiro.

=== Consistent policies ===
Support for the productive sector has been simplified at all levels; active and independent, Congress and the Judiciary Branch carry out the evaluation of rules and regulations. Among the main measures taken to stimulate the economy are the reduction of up to 30 percent on manufactured products tax (IPI), and the investment of $8 billion on road cargo transportation fleets, thus improving distribution logistics. Further resources guarantee the propagation of business and information telecenters.

The policy for industry, technology and foreign trade, at the forefront of this sector, for its part, invests $19.5 billion in specific sectors, following the example of the software and semiconductor, pharmaceutical and medicine product, and capital goods sectors.

=== Mergers and acquisitions ===
Between 1985 and 2017, 11,563 mergers & acquisitions with a total known value of US$1,185 billion with the involvement of Brazilian firms were announced. The year 2010 was a new record in terms of value with $115 billion of transactions. It is worth noticing, that in the top 100 deals by value there are only four cases of Brazilian companies acquiring a foreign company. This reflects the strong interest in the country from a direct investment perspective.

Here is a list of the largest deals where Brazilian companies took on either the role of the acquiror or the target:

Date Announced	Acquiror Name	Acquiror Mid Industry	Acquiror Nation	Target Name	Target Mid Industry	Target Nation	Value of Transaction ($mil)
9 January 2010	Petrobras	Oil & Gas	Brazil	Brazil-Oil & Gas Blocks	Oil & Gas	Brazil	42,877.03
20 February 2017	Vale SA	Metals & Mining	Brazil	Valepar SA	Metals & Mining	Brazil	20,956.66
8 November 2006	Cia Vale do Rio Doce SA	Metals & Mining	Brazil	Inco Ltd	Metals & Mining	Canada	17,150.30
20 February 2008	BM&F	Brokerage	Brazil	Bovespa Holding SA	Brokerage	Brazil	10,309.09
13 January 2000	Telefónica SA	Telecommunications Services	Spain	Telecommunicacoes de São Paulo	Telecommunications Services	Brazil	10,213.31
31 July 2014	Telefónica Brasil SA	Telecommunications Services	Brazil	GVT Participacoes SA	Telecommunications Services	Brazil	9,823.31
5 October 2010	Telefónica SA	Telecommunications Services	Spain	Brasilcel NV	Telecommunications Services	Brazil	9,742.79
11 March 2008	Banco Itaú Holding Financeira	Banks	Brazil	Unibanco Holdings SA	Other Financials	Brazil	8,464.77
3 March 2004	Ambev	Food and Beverage	Brazil	John Labatt Ltd	Food and Beverage	Canada	7,758.01
10 January 2010	China Petrochemical Corporation	Oil & Gas	China	Repsol YPF Brasil SA	Oil & Gas	Brazil	7,111.00
2 July 2012	Banestado Participacoes	Other Financials	Brazil	Redecard SA	Computers & Peripherals	Brazil	6,821.71

=== Entrepreneurship ===
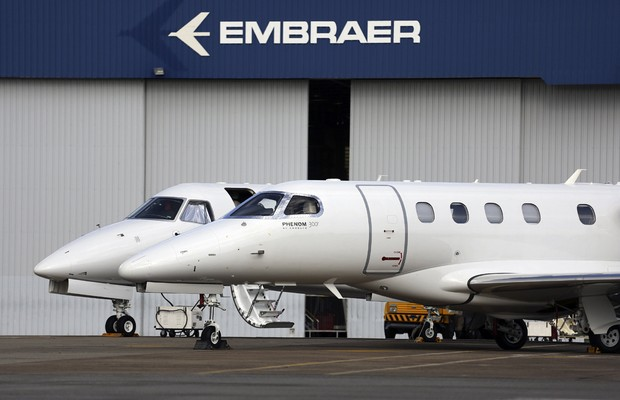
Embraer, a Brazilian company, is the third-largest commercial jet maker in the world, just behind Airbus and Boeing.

According to a search of Global Entrepreneurship Monitor in 2011 Brazil had 27 million adults aged between 18 and 64 either starting or owning a business, meaning that more than one in four Brazilian adults were entrepreneurs. In comparison to the other 54 countries studied, Brazil was the third-highest in total number of entrepreneurs. The Institute of Applied Economic Research (Ipea), a government agency, found that 37 million jobs in Brazil were associated with businesses with less than 10 employees.

Even though Brazil ranks internationally as one of the hardest countries in the region to do business due to its complicated bureaucracy, there is a healthy number of entrepreneurs, thanks to the huge internal consumer market and various government programs.

The most recent research of Global Entrepreneurship Monitor revealed in 2013 that 50.4% of Brazilian new entrepreneurs are men, 33.8% are in the 35–44 age group, 36.9% completed high school and 47.9% earn 3–6 times the Brazilian minimum wage. In contrast, 49.6% of entrepreneurs are female, only 7% are in the 55–64 age group, 1% have postgraduate education and 1.7% earn more than 9 times the minimum wage.

=== Credit rating ===
Brazil's credit rating was downgraded by Standard & Poor's (S&P) to BBB in March 2014, just one notch above junk. It was further downgraded in January 2018 by S&P to BB−, which is 2 notches below investment grade.

=== Largest companies ===
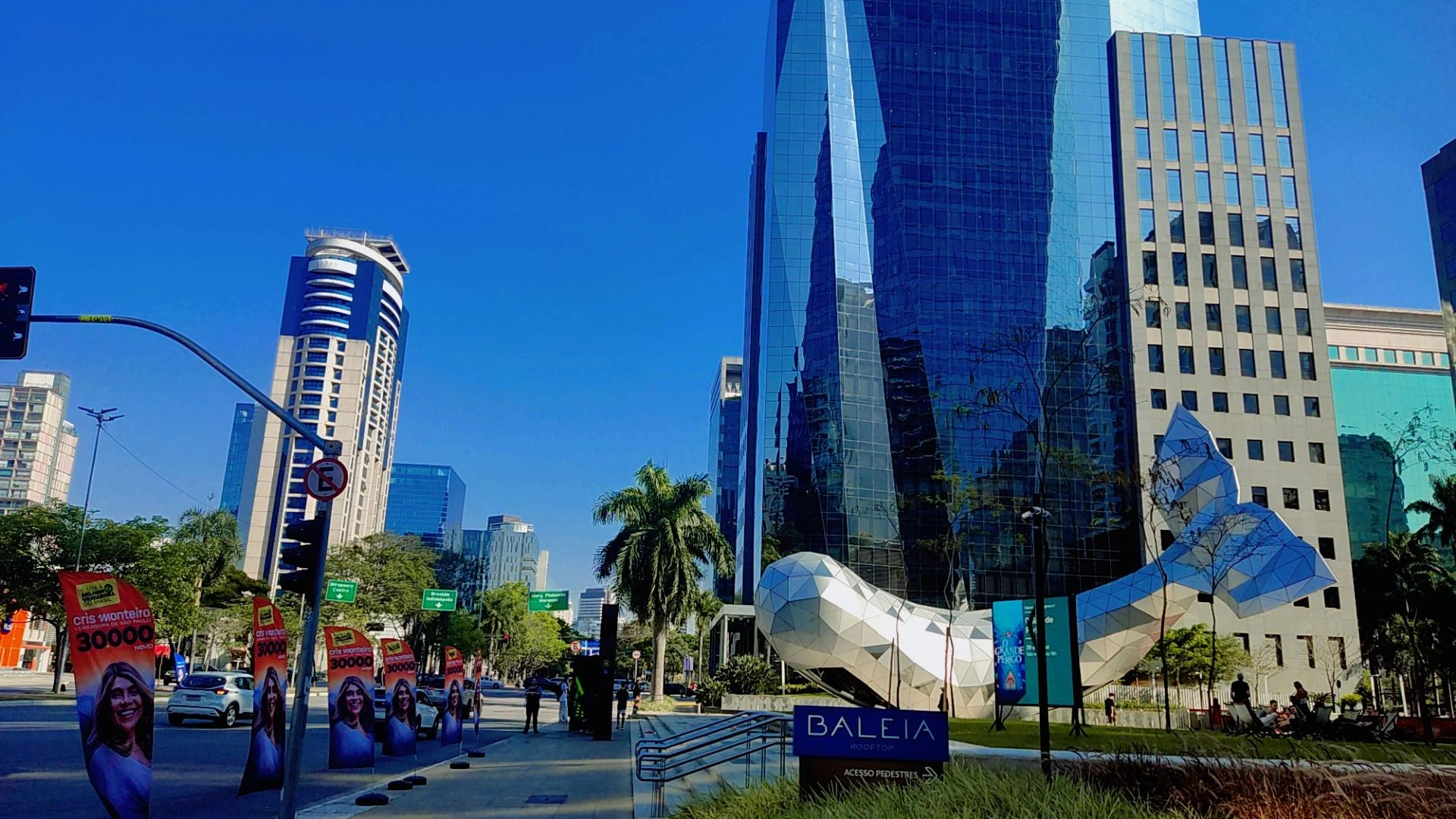
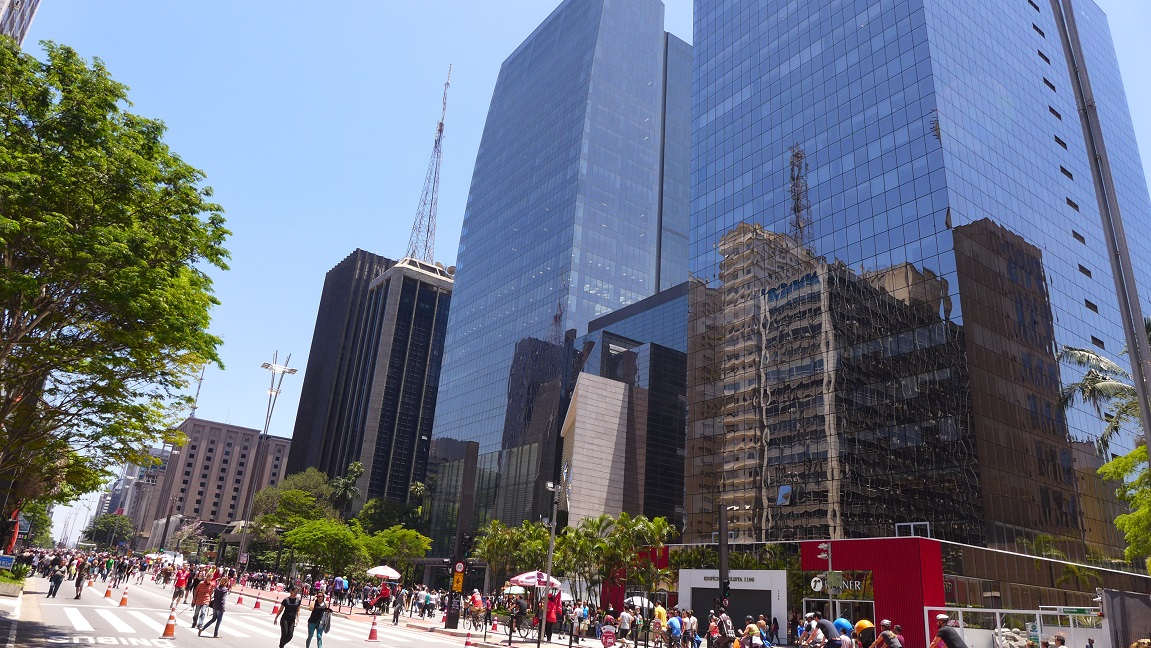
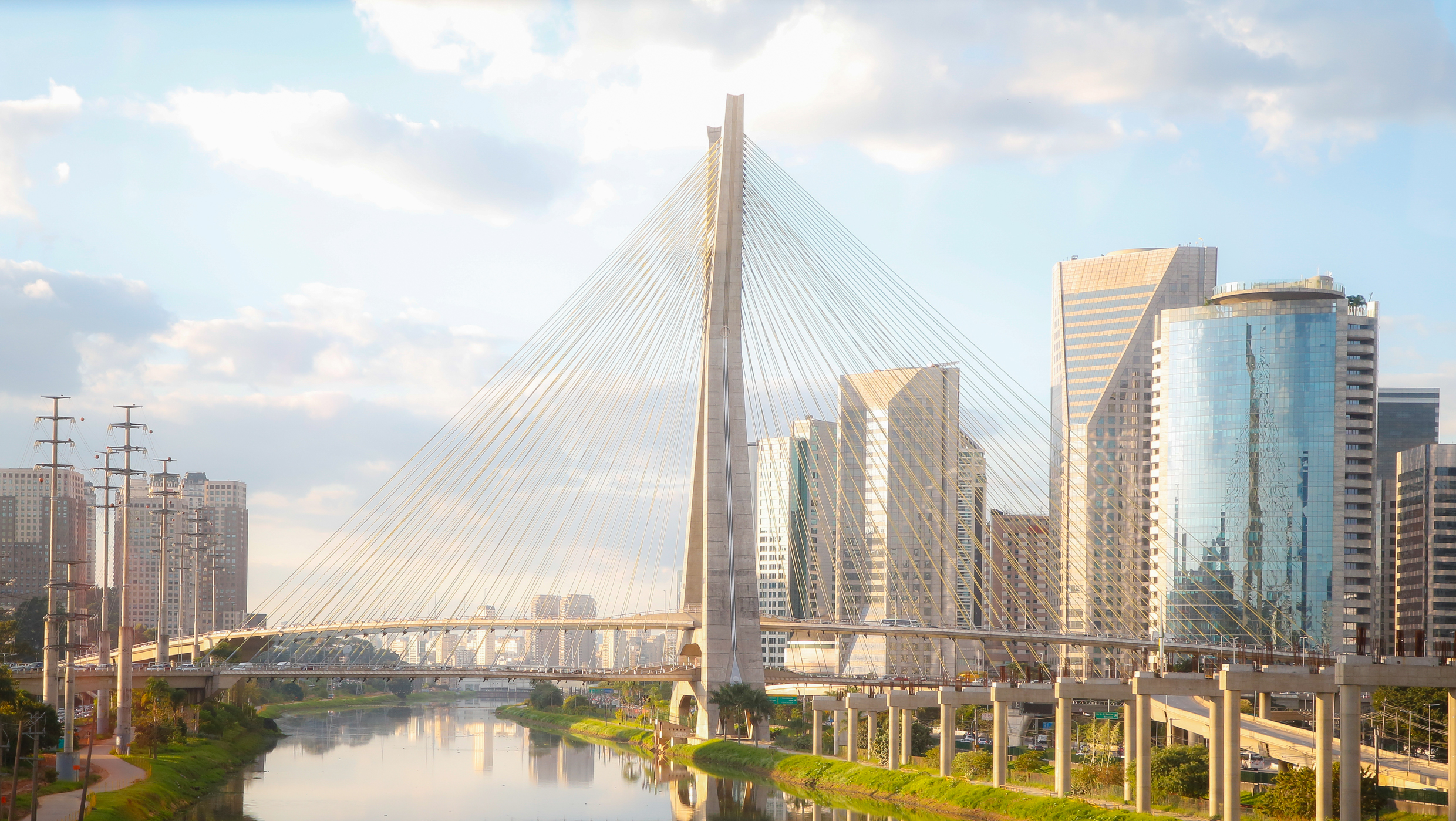
Avenida Brigadeiro Faria Lima, Avenida Paulista and Brooklin Novo, in São Paulo, are the largest economic and financial centers in the country.

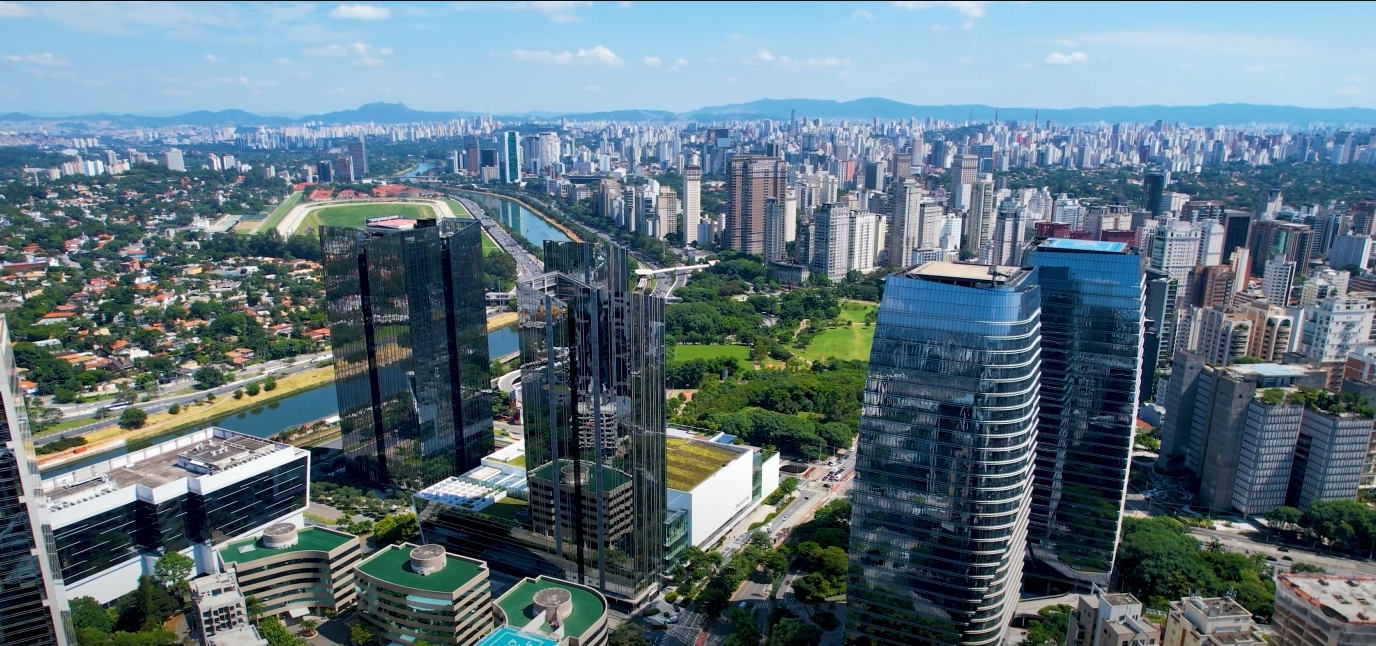
São Paulo is the largest financial center in the country and one of the largest in the world.

In 2017, 20 Brazilian companies were listed in the Forbes Global 2000 list – an annual ranking of the top 2000 public companies in the world by Forbes magazine based on a combination of sales, assets, profit, and market value. The 20 companies listed were:

World Rank	Company	Industry	Revenue (billion $)	Profits (billion $)	Assets (billion $)	Market Value (billion $)	Headquarters
38	Banco Itaú Unibanco	Banking	61.3	6.7	419.9	79.2	São Paulo
62	Banco Bradesco	Banking	70.2	4.3	362.4	53.5	Osasco, SP
132	Banco do Brasil	Banking	57.3	2.3	430.6	29	Brasília
156	Vale	Mining	27.1	3.8	99.1	45.4	Rio de Janeiro
399	Petrobras	Oil & Gas	81.1	−4.3	247.3	61.3	Rio de Janeiro
610	Eletrobras	Utilities	17.4	0.983	52.4	7.2	Rio de Janeiro
791	Itaúsa	Conglomerate	1.3	2.4	18.1	23	São Paulo
895	JBS	Food Processing	48.9	0.108	31.6	8.2	São Paulo
981	Ultrapar	Conglomerate	22.2	0.448	7.4	12.5	São Paulo
1103	Cielo	Financial services	3.5	1.1	9.4	20.9	Barueri, SP
1233	Braskem	Chemicals	13.8	−0.136	15.9	7.9	São Paulo
1325	BRF	Food processing	9.7	−0.107	13.8	9.3	Itajaí, SC
1436	Sabesp	Waste Management	4	0.846	11.6	7.4	São Paulo
1503	Oi	Telecommunications	7.5	−2	25.2	0.952	Rio de Janeiro
1515	Gerdau	Iron & Steel	10.8	−0.395	16.8	1.4	Porto Alegre, RS
1545	CBD	Retail	12	0.139	13.9	5.9	São Paulo
1572	CCR	Transportation	2.9	0.429	7.5	11.5	São Paulo
1597	Bovespa	Stock Exchange	0.666	0.415	9.7	12.8	São Paulo
1735	CPFL Energia	Electricity	5.4	0.258	13	8.4	Campinas, SP
1895	Cogna Educação	Higher Education	1.5	0.535	5.4	7.1	Belo Horizonte, MG

== See also ==
- List of companies of Brazil
- Economic history of Brazil
- List of Brazilians by net worth
- List of economic crises in Brazil
- Brazil and the World Bank
- Economy of São Paulo
- List of Brazilian federative units by gross domestic product
- List of Brazilian states by poverty rate
- 2015–2017 Brazilian economic crisis
- Corruption in Brazil
- Trade unions in Brazil
- List of Latin American and Caribbean countries by GDP growth
- List of Latin American and Caribbean countries by GDP (nominal)
- List of Latin American and Caribbean countries by GDP (PPP)
- Inflation indexes in Brazil
