= List of companies of Brazil =

Location of Brazil

Brazil is the largest country in both South America and Latin America. Brazil's economy is the world's ninth-largest by nominal GDP and seventh-largest by GDP (PPP) as of 2015. A member of the BRICS group, Brazil until 2010 had one of the world's fastest growing major economies, with its economic reforms giving the country new international recognition and influence. Brazil's national development bank plays an important role for the country's economic growth. Brazil is a founding member of the United Nations, the G20, BRICS, Unasul, Mercosul, Organization of American States, Organization of Ibero-American States, CPLP, and the Latin Union. Brazil is a regional power in Latin America and a middle power in international affairs, with some analysts identifying it as an emerging global power. One of the world's major breadbaskets, Brazil has been the largest producer of coffee for the last 150 years.

For further information on the types of business entities in this country and their abbreviations, see "Business entities in Brazil".

== Largest firms ==
This list shows firms in the Fortune Global 500, which ranks firms by total revenues reported before January 31, 2025. Only the top five firms (if available) are included as a sample.

Rank	Image	Name	2024 Revenues (US$M)	Employees	Notes
99		Petrobras	102,409	46,730	Large petroleum refining firm in Rio de Janeiro. The company has been on the list for 22 years, peaking at 23 in 2012. An 18% drop in revenues has moved them down to 99th.
176		JBS S.A.	72,863	272,565	Massive meat processing concern with facilities around the world. JBS entered the list in 2010 and has rapidly risen to its current position of 191.
189		Banco Itaú Unibanco	68,455	95,702	Large financial conglomerate headquartered in São Paulo. The firm debuted on the list in 2014 at 138 and has risen on the list despite a 21% drop in revenues.
217		Banco do Brasil	63,322	86,220	One of the largest banks in Latin America, Banco do Brasil is headquartered in Brasília. While the firm has been on the F500 list for 23 years, it moved dramatically, almost dropping off the list in 2002 but climbing back to 88 in 2012.
252		Banco Bradesco	56,490	79,583	Large banking and financial services company with operations worldwide. The firm has experienced a significant drop in revenues in recent years, but rose 31% in 2017 to move back to 154 on the list.

== Notable firms ==
This list includes notable companies with primary headquarters located in the country. The industry and sector follow the Industry Classification Benchmark taxonomy. Organizations which have ceased operations are included and noted as defunct.

Notable companies Status: P=Private, S=State; A=Active, D=Defunct
Name	Industry	Sector	Headquarters	Founded	Notes	Status	
Agrale	Consumer goods	Commercial vehicles	Caxias do Sul	1962	Bus, coach, tractor, truck & military vehicles	P	A
Airship do Brasil	Industrials	Aerospace	São Paulo	2005	The only blimp manufacturer in Latin America	P	A
Algar	Telecommunications	Fixed line telecommunications	Uberlândia	1954	Fixed-line & mobile	P	A
Alupar	Utilities	Conventional electricity	São Paulo	2007	Power generation, transmission lines, wind farms	P	A
Amaggi Group	Agribusiness	Agricultural commodities	Cuiabá	1977	Commodities, Logistics, Energy	P	A
AmBev	Consumer goods	Brewers	São Paulo	1999	Brewery, (B3: AMBV3, AMBV4)	P	A
Andrade Gutierrez	Conglomerates	-	Belo Horizonte	1948	Construction and building materials, engineering (B3: ANDG3B, ANDG4B)	P	A
Aperam South America	Basic materials	Iron & steel	Belo Horizonte	1944	Steel	P	A
Aracruz Celulose	Basic materials	Paper	Aracruz	1972	Paper, merged into Fibria in 2009	P	D
AstralSat	Consumer services	Broadcasting & entertainment	São Paulo	2005	Satellite television	P	A
Avianca Brasil	Consumer services	Airlines	São Paulo	1998	Airlines	P	D
Avibras	Industrials	Aerospace & defense	São José dos Campos	1961	Missiles, rockets, military vehicles	P	A
Azul Brazilian Airlines	Consumer services	Airlines	Barueri	2008	Low cost carrier	P	A
B2W	Technology	Internet	Rio de Janeiro	2006	E-commerce, (B3: BTOW3)	P	A
B3	Financials	Financial services	São Paulo	1890	Stock exchange	P	A
Banco Bradesco	Financials	Banks	Osasco	1943	Private bank, (B3: BBDC3, BBDC4)	P	A
Banco do Brasil	Financials	Banks	Rio de Janeiro	1808	State controlled bank, (B3: BBAS11, BBAS12, BBAS3)	S	A
Banco Nossa Caixa	Financials	Banks	São Paulo	1916	Bank, defunct 2008	P	D
Banco Safra	Financials	Banks	São Paulo	1955	Local bank	P	A
Banestes	Financials	Banks	Vitória	1937	State bank, (B3: BEES3, BEES11)	S	A
Banrisul	Financials	Banks	Porto Alegre	1928	Bank, (B3: BRSR3, BRSR5, BRSR6)	P	A
BM&F Bovespa	Financials	Investment services	São Paulo	1890	Exchange, (B3: BVMF3)	P	A
Bob's	Consumer services	Restaurants & bars	Rio de Janeiro	1952	Restaurants	P	A
Bradespar	Financials	Banks	São Paulo	2000	Investment holding, (B3: BRAP3, BRAP4)	P	A
Brasil & Movimento	Consumer goods	Automobiles	São Paulo	2000	Motorcycles & bicycles, defunct 2011	P	D
Brasil Kirin	Consumer goods	Brewers	Itu	1939	Brewery	P	D
Brasil Telecom	Telecommunications	Fixed line telecommunications	Brasília	1998	Telecommunications, defunct 2009	P	D
Braskem	Basic materials	Specialty chemicals	São Paulo	2002	Petrochemicals, (B3: BRKM3, BRKM5)	P	A
BRF S.A.	Consumer goods	Food & beverages	São Paulo	2009	Beverage and food	P	A
BTG Pactual	Financials	Financial services	São Paulo	1983	Financial services	P	A
Caixa Econômica Federal	Financials	Banks	Rio de Janeiro	1861	State bank	S	A
Caloi	Consumer goods	Recreational products	São Paulo	1898	Bicycles	P	A
Carbuss	Consumer goods	Commercial vehicles	Joinville	2017	Bus & coach	P	A
Casas Bahia	Consumer services	Specialty retailers	São Caetano do Sul	1952	Furniture, home retail	P	A
CBC	Industrials	Defense	São Paulo	1926	Ammunition	P	A
Celesc	Utilities	Conventional electricity	Florianópolis	1955	Electrical utility, (B3: CLSC3, CLSC5, CLSC6)	P	A
CEMIG	Utilities	Conventional electricity	Belo Horizonte	1952	Electrical utility, (B3: CMIG3, CMIG4)	P	A
CESP	Utilities	Conventional electricity	São Paulo	1966	Electrical utility, (B3: CESP3, CESP5, CESP6)	P	A
Chamonix	Consumer goods	Automobiles	São Paulo	1987	Sports cars, replicas	P	A
CI&T	Information technology	software	Campinas	1995	Agile software development, Infrastructure management, Mobile application development, Software design	P	A
Cia. Hering	Consumer goods	Clothing & accessories	Blumenau	1880	Apparel department stores, (B3: HGTX3)	P	A
Cielo	Financials	Investment services	Barueri	1997	Financial transactions	P	A
Citrosuco	Consumer goods	Food & beverages	Matão	2010	Orange juice, essential oil, limonene	P	A
Comil	Consumer goods	Commercial vehicles	Erechim	1985	Bus and Coach	P	A
Comgás	Utilities	Gas distribution	São Paulo	1872	Gas utility, subsidiary of Cosan (B3: CGAS3, CGAS5)	P	A
CPFL	Utilities	Conventional electricity	Campinas	1912	Electrical utility, (B3: CPFE3)	P	A
Companhia Siderúrgica Nacional	Basic materials	Iron & steel	São Paulo	1941	Steel, (B3: CSNA3)	P	A
Copel	Utilities	Conventional electricity	Curitiba	1954	Electrical utility, (B3: CPLE3, CPLE5, CPLE6)	P	A
Correios	Industrials	Delivery services	Brasília	1663	Postal services	S	A
Cosan	Conglomerates	-	São Paulo	1936	Energy, ethanol, fuel, logistics, (B3: CSAN3)	P	A
CTEEP	Utilities	Conventional electricity	São Paulo	1999	Electrical utility, (B3: TRPL3, TRPL4)	P	A
Cyrela Brazil Realty	Real estate	Real estate holding & development	São Paulo	1962	Real estate construction, (B3: CYRE3)	P	A
Dafra Motos	Consumer goods	Automobiles	Manaus	2007	Motorcycles	P	A
D'Alegria	Consumer goods	Musical instruments	Rio de Janeiro	2003	Electric guitars and basses	P	A
DASA	Health care	Health care providers	Barueri	2003	Clinical laboratory	P	A
Del Vecchio	Consumer goods	Musical instruments	São Paulo	1902	Classical and resonator guitars	P	A
Duratex	Basic materials	Paper	São Paulo	1961	Wood and paper, (B3: DURA3, DURA4)	P	A
EBX Group	Conglomerates	-	Rio de Janeiro	1984	Energy, mining, transportation	P	A
Eletrobras Furnas	Utilities	Conventional electricity	Rio de Janeiro	1957	Electrical utility	P	A
Eletrobrás	Utilities	Conventional electricity	Rio de Janeiro	1962	Electrical utility, (B3: ELET3, ELET5, ELET6)	P	A
Elo	Financial	Financial Services	Barueri	2011	Credit card, debit card, and prepaid card issuing and network processing	P	A
Embraco	Industrials	Industrial machinery	Joinville	1971	Refrigeration compressors & condensers	P	A
Embraer	Industrials	Aerospace & defense	São Paulo	1969	Civil & military aircraft, (B3: EMBR3)	P	A
Embratel	Telecommunications	Fixed line telecommunications	Rio de Janeiro	1965	Fixed-line & mobile, part of América Móvil, (B3: EBTP3, EBTP4)	P	A
EMGEPRON	Industrials	Shipbuilding	Rio de Janeiro	1982	Naval shipbuilding, engineering, munitions, part of Brazilian Navy	S	A
Embrapa	Research	Farming & fishing research	Brasília	1972	Agricultural research	S	A
EMS	Health care	Pharmaceuticals	Hortolândia	1950	Pharma	P	A
Enel São Paulo	Utilities	Conventional electricity	Barueri	1899	Electrical utility, (B3: ELPL3, ELPL5, ELPL6)	P	A
Estaleiro Atlântico Sul	Industrials	Shipbuilding	Ipojuca	2005	FPSO, Oil tankers, Oil platforms, Platform supply vessels, Tugboats	P	A
Estrela	Consumer goods	Toys	São Paulo	1937	Toys, (B3: ESTR3, ESTR4)	P	A
Eurofarma	Health care	Pharmaceuticals	São Paulo	1972	Pharma	P	A
Extrafarma	Consumer services	Drug retailers	Belém	1960	Drugstore chain, subsidiary of Ultrapar	P	A
Fabral	Consumer goods	Automobiles	Palmas	2002	Off-road SUVs, defunct 2003	P	D
Fibria	Basic materials	Paper	São Paulo	2009	Pulp and Paper and lumber	P	A
Finta	Consumer goods	Clothing & accessories	São Paulo	1987	Boots, balls, sport equipment and accessories	P	A
Forship	Industrials	Engineering & contracting services	Rio de Janeiro	1998	Commissioning, O&M, C&M, Consultancy, HMSWeb	P	A
Gafisa	Real estate	Real estate holding & development	São Paulo	1954	Real estate construction, (B3: GFSA3)	P	A
Garoto	Consumer goods	Food & beverages	Vila Velha	1929	Chocolate	P	A
Gerdau	Basic materials	Iron & steel	Porto Alegre	1901	Steel, (B3: GGBR3, GGBR4)	P	A
Giannini	Consumer goods	Musical instruments	São Paulo	1900	Multiple instruments	P	A
Global Táxi Aéreo	Consumer services	Airlines	São Paulo	1994	Charter Airlines	P	A
Gol Transportes Aéreos	Consumer services	Airlines	São Paulo	2000	Airline, (B3: GOLL3, GOLL4)	P	A
GPA	Consumer services	Food retailers & wholesalers	São Paulo	1948	Markets, owned by Groupe Casino (B3: PCAR3, PCAR4)	P	A
Grupo Abril	Consumer services	Broadcasting & entertainment	São Paulo	1950	Publisher, television	P	A
Grupo Caoa	Consumer goods	Automobiles	São Paulo	1979	Automotive	P	A
Grupo Folha	Consumer services	Publishing	São Paulo	1921	Publisher	P	A
Grupo Globo	Consumer services	Broadcasting & entertainment	Rio de Janeiro	1965	Television	P	A
Grupo Positivo	Conglomerates	-	Curitiba	1972	Publishing, technology, education, (B3: POSI3)	P	A
Gurgel	Consumer goods	Automobiles	Rio Claro	1969	Automotive, defunct 1996	P	D
Habib's	Consumer goods	Restaurants & bars	São Paulo	1988	Restaurants	P	A
Havaianas	Consumer goods	Clothing & accessories	São Paulo	1962	Flip Flops, sandals, personal accessories	P	A
Helibras	Industrials	Aerospace & defense	Itajubá	1978	Civil & military helicopters, subsidiary of Airbus Helicopters (Europe)	P	A
Hidden Pousadas Brazil	Consumer services	Travel & tourism	Rio de Janeiro	2008	Brazilian tourism	P	A
Hypermarcas	Health care	Pharmaceuticals	São Paulo	2001	Pharma	P	A
IGB Eletrônica	Consumer goods	Consumer electronics	Manaus	1964	Electronics, (B3: IGBR3)	P	A
IMBEL	Arms Industry	Defense	Piquete	1934	Firearms and munition	P	A
Infraero	Industrials	Heavy construction	Brasília	1973	State-owned transportation infrastructure	S	A
Iochpe-Maxion	Consumer goods	Auto parts	São Paulo	1918	Wheels, (B3: MYPK4, MYPK3)	P	A
Ipiranga	Energy	Oil & gas refining & marketing	Porto Alegre	1937	Subsidiary of Ultrapar	P	A
Banco Itaú Unibanco	Financials	Banks	São Paulo	2008	Bank, (B3: ITAUB3, ITAUB4)	P	A
Itaúsa	Conglomerates	-	São Paulo	1966	Finance, health care, chemicals, (B3: ITSA3, ITSA4)	P	A
Itautec	Technology	Computer hardware	São Paulo	1979	Computer Systems	P	A
JBS S.A.	Consumer goods	Food & beverages	São Paulo	1953	Meat processing, (B3: JBSS3)	P	A
Klabin	Basic materials	Paper	São Paulo	1899	Paper, (B3: KLBN3, KLBN4)	P	A
LATAM Brasil	Consumer services	Airlines	São Paulo	1976	Airline, (B3: TAMM3, TAMM4)	P	A
Light	Utilities	Conventional electricity	Rio de Janeiro	1904	Electrical utility, (B3: PCAR3, PCAR4)	P	A
Lojas Americanas	Consumer services	Diversified retailers	Rio de Janeiro	1929	Retail, (B3: LAME3, LAME4)	P	A
Lojas Renner	Consumer goods	Clothing & accessories	Porto Alegre	1912	Apparel department Store, (B3: LREN3)	P	A
Lojas Riachuelo	Consumer goods	Clothing & accessories	Natal	1947	Apparel department stores	P	A
M. Dias Branco	Consumer goods	Food & beverages	Eusébio	1936	Beverage and food	P	A
Máquina de Vendas	Consumer services	Diversified retailers	São Paulo	2010	Retail	P	A
Marcopolo	Consumer goods	Commercial vehicles	Caxias do Sul	1949	Bus and coach, (B3: POMO3, POMO4)	P	A
Marfrig	Consumer goods	Food & beverages	São Paulo	2000	Food processing (MRFG3)	P	A
Mascarello	Consumer goods	Commercial vehicles	Cascavel	2003	Bus & coach	P	A
Módulo	Technology	Software	Rio de Janeiro	1985	Technology	P	A
Mondial	Consumer goods	Consumer electronics	Barueri	1999	Cookware, small and medium appliances, power tools	P	A
Motiva	Transportation	Transportation services	São Paulo	1945	Transportation, (B3: CCRO3)	P	A
Mover Participações	Conglomerates	-	São Paulo	1939	Construction, real estate, oil & gas, (B3: CCIM3)	P	A
MRS Logística	Transportation	Delivery services	Rio de Janeiro	1997	Logistics	P	A
MRV Engenharia	Industrials	Heavy construction	Belo Horizonte	1979	Construction, (B3: MRVE3)	P	A
Multilaser	Consumer goods	Consumer electronics	São Paulo	1987	Electronics	P	A
Mundial	Industrials	General industries	São Paulo	1896	Tableware, cutlery, motors and fasteners	P	A
MWM International Motores	Consumer goods	Auto parts	São Paulo	1953	Diesel engines manufacturing, subsidiary of Navistar International (USA)	P	A
Natura	Consumer goods	Personal products	São Paulo	1969	Cosmetics, (B3: NATU3)	P	A
Neobus	Consumer goods	Commercial vehicles	Caxias do Sul	1996	Bus and coach, subsidiary of Marcopolo	P	A
NET	Telecommunications	Fixed-line telecommunications	São Paulo	1991	Internet, (B3: NETC3, NETC4), defunct 2019	P	D
Netshoes	Technology	Internet	São Paulo	2000	E-commerce, footwear, sport goods	P	A
Nubank	Financials	Banks	São Paulo	2013	Private bank	P	A
O Boticário	Consumer goods	Personal products	São José dos Pinhais	1977	Personal care	P	A
Oi	Telecommunications	Fixed line telecommunications	Rio de Janeiro	1998	Fixed-line & mobile	P	A
Oxiteno	Basic materials	Diversified chemicals	São Paulo	1970	Chemicals, subsidiary of Ultrapar	P	A
Pantanal Linhas Aéreas	Consumer services	Airlines	São Paulo	1990	Airline, defunct 2013	P	D
Petrobras	Energy	Oil & gas exploration & production	Rio de Janeiro	1953	Petroleum, (B3: PETR3, PETR4)	P	A
Porto Seguro	Financials	General insurance	São Paulo	1945	Insurance	P	A
Positivo Tecnologia	Consumer goods	Consumer electronics	Curitiba	1989	Electronics, subsidiary of Grupo Positivo	P	A
Puma	Consumer goods	Automobiles	São Paulo	1963	Sports cars	P	A
Rainha	Consumer goods	Clothing & accessories	São Paulo	1934	Sport shoes and related equipment	P	A
Raízen	Energy	Oil & gas refining & marketing	São Paulo	2010	Bioethanol and fuel, joint venture of Cosan & Royal Dutch Shell (UK/Netherlands)	P	A
Record	Consumer services	Broadcasting & entertainment	São Paulo	1953	Television, part of Grupo Record	P	A
Rede S.A.	Financials	Financial services	Barueri	1996	Financial services, (B3: RDCD3)	P	A
RedeTV!	Consumer services	Broadcasting & entertainment	Osasco	1999	Television	P	A
Rico Linhas Aéreas	Consumer services	Airlines	Manaus	1996	Airline, defunct 2010	P	D
Rio de Janeiro Metro	Consumer services	Airlines	Rio de Janeiro	1979	(B3: OPRT3)	P	A
Rossi Residencial	Real estate	Real estate holding & development	São Paulo	1992	Real estate construction, (B3: RSID3)	P	A
Rumo Logística	Transportation	Railroads	Curitiba	1997	Railways, (B3: ALL11, ALL3, ALL4)	P	A
Sabesp	Utilities	Water	São Paulo	1973	Water & waste management, (B3: SBSP3)	P	A
Serviço Federal de Processamento de Dados	Technology	Software	Brasília	1964	State-owned IT services	S	A
SIATT	Industrials	Aerospace & defense	São José dos Campos	2015	Missiles	P	A
SBT	Consumer services	Broadcasting & entertainment	São Paulo	1981	Television	P	A
SulAmérica	Financials	General insurance	Rio de Janeiro	1895	Insurance	P	A
Suzano Papel e Celulose	Basic materials	Paper	Salvador	1924	Pulp and paper and lumber	P	A
TAC	Consumer goods	Automobiles	Joinville	2004	SUVs	P	A
Tagima	Consumer goods	Musical instruments	São Paulo	1986	Electric, acoustic, and classical guitars and basses	P	A
Taurus	Industrials	Defense	Porto Alegre	1939	Firearms, (B3: FJTA3, FJTA4)	P	A
Tectoy	Consumer goods	Consumer electronics	São Paulo	1987	Electronics, toys, video games	P	A
Telequartz	Basic materials	General mining	Rio de Janeiro	1926	Mining	P	A
Tonante	Consumer goods	Musical instruments	São Paulo	1954	Electric and acoustic guitars	P	A
TOTVS	Information technology	Software	São Paulo	1983	Business management software, cloud computing	P	A
Total Linhas Aéreas	Consumer services	Airlines	Belo Horizonte	1988	Airline	P	A
Tramontina	Consumer goods	Cuttlery and metalurgy	Carlos Barbosa	1911	Kitchenware, cookware, power tools, home appliances and accessories	P	A
TRIP Linhas Aéreas	Consumer services	Airlines	São Paulo	1998	Airline, defunct 2014	P	D
Troller Veículos Especiais	Consumer goods	Automobiles	Horizonte	1995	SUVs, defunct 2021	P	D
TV Cultura	Consumer services	Broadcasting & entertainment	São Paulo	1960	Television	P	A
Ultragaz	Utilities	Gas distribution	São Paulo	1937	Gas utility, subsidiary of Ultrapar	P	A
Ultrapar	Conglomerates	-	São Paulo	1937	Chemicals, drugstores, fuel, logistics (B3: UGPA3, UGPA4)	P	A
UOL	Telecommunications	Fixed-line telecommunications	São Paulo	1996	Internet service provider, (B3: UOLL3, UOLL4)	P	A
Usiminas	Basic materials	Iron & steel	Belo Horizonte	1956	Steel, (B3: USIM3, USIM5, USIM6)	P	A
Vale	Basic materials	General mining	Rio de Janeiro	1942	Mining, (B3: VALE3, VALE5)	P	A
Varig	Consumer services	Airlines	Porto Alegre	1927	Airline, defunct 2006	P	D
Vibra Energia	Energy	Oil & gas exploration & production	Rio de Janeiro	1971	Fuel, biofuel	P	A
Vigor S.A.	Consumer goods	Food & beverages	Anta Gorda	1917	Dairy, part of Grupo Lala (Mexico)	P	A
Vivo	Telecommunications	Fixed line telecommunications	São Paulo	1993	Fixed-line & mobile, subsidiary of Telefónica (Spain), (B3: VIVO3, VIVO4)	P	A
Votorantim	Conglomerates	-	São Paulo	1918	Financials, energy, paper, (B3: VCPA3, VCPA4)	P	A
WebJet Linhas Aéreas	Consumer services	Airlines	Rio de Janeiro	2005	Airline, defunct 2012	P	D
WEG	Industrials	Electrical equipment	Jaraguá do Sul	1961	Electric motors, generators, switchgears, transformers, industrial automation, wind and steam turbines (B3: WEGE3)	P	A
Wilson, Sons	Industrials	Transportation services	Rio de Janeiro	1837	Port Terminals, towage, logistics, shipping Agency, offshore, and shipyards	P	A
XMobots	Industrials	Aerospace & defense	São Paulo	2007	Unmanned systems	P	A
XP Inc.	Financials	Financial services	São Paulo	2001	Financial services	P	A

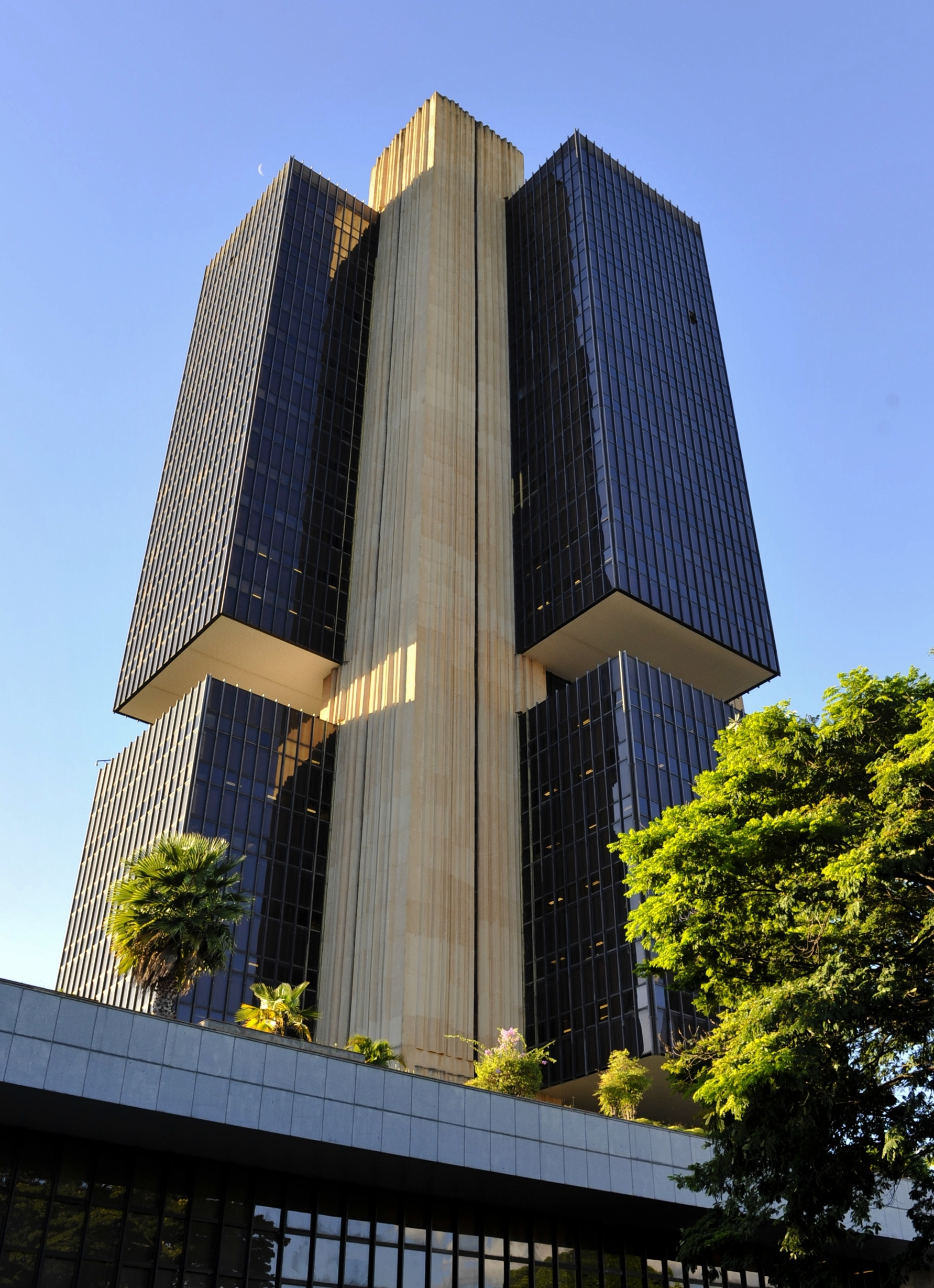
Central Bank of Brazil, in Brasília

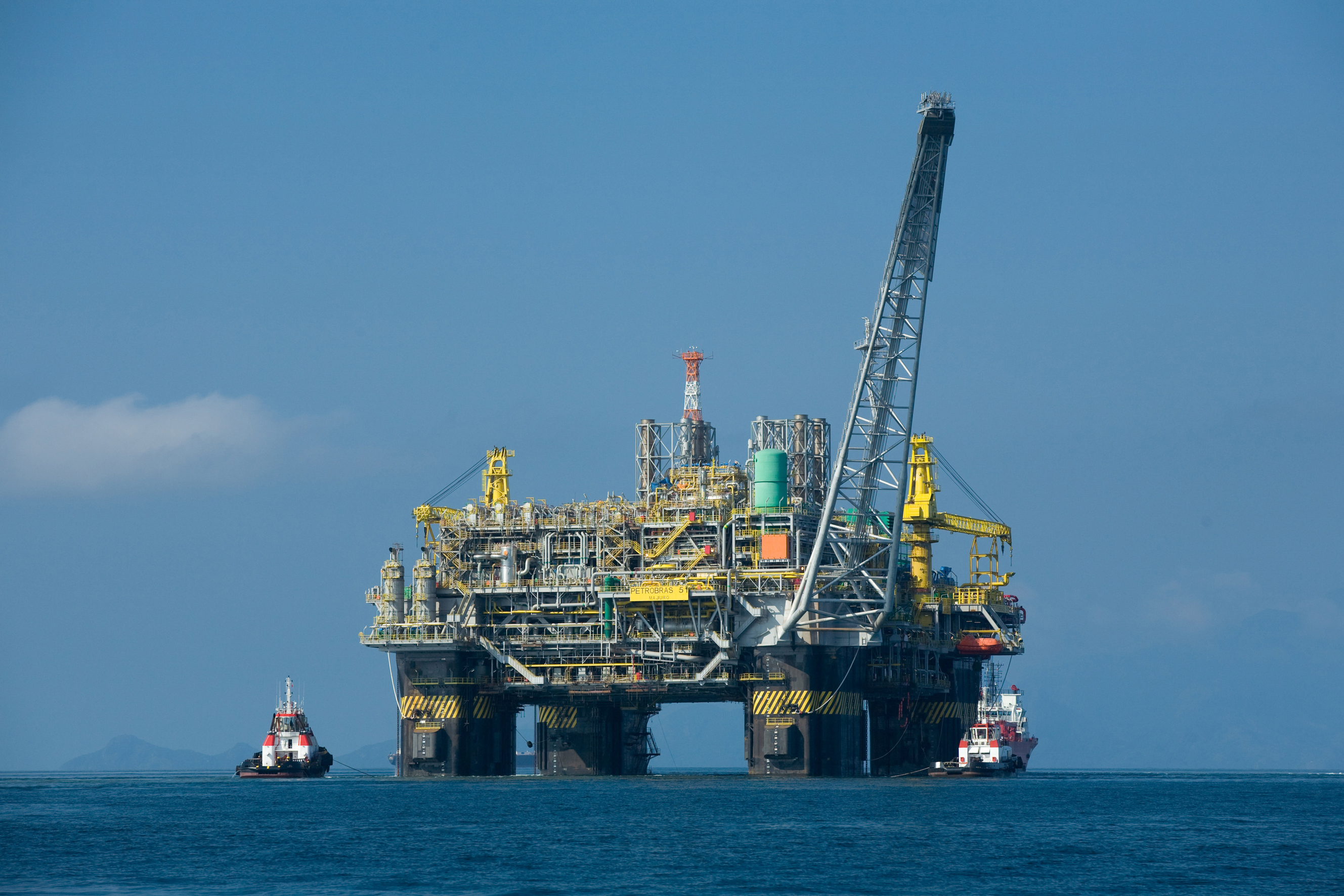
P-51, a Brazil made oil platform of Petrobras.

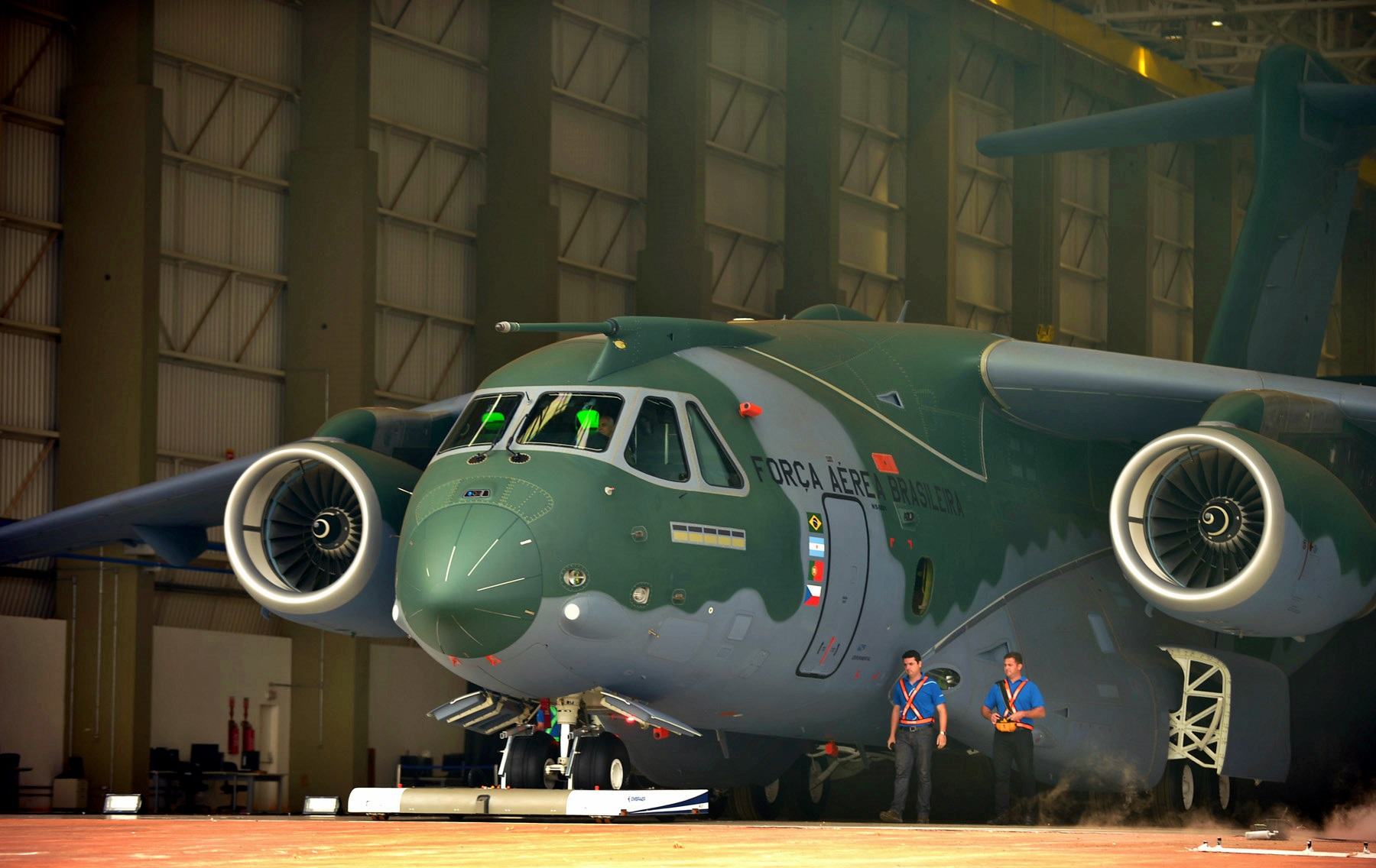
A KC-390 military transport aircraft, developed by Brazilian company Embraer.
