= The Commission =

The Commission may refer to:

== Organizations ==
- Sicilian Mafia Commission, the governing body of the Mafia in Italy
- The Commission (American Mafia), the governing body of the Mafia in the United States
- European Commission, the executive branch of the European Union

== Other uses ==
- The Commission (hip hop), an American hip-hop group from the mid 1990s
- The Commission (album), a 1998 album by Lil' Keke
- "The Commission" (song), a 2021 single by Cain
- The Commission, a secretive time-policing organization featured in The Umbrella Academy

== See also ==
- Commission (disambiguation)
- Decommission (disambiguation)
