= Ibis Dam =

Early 20th-century dam in Far North Queensland, Australia

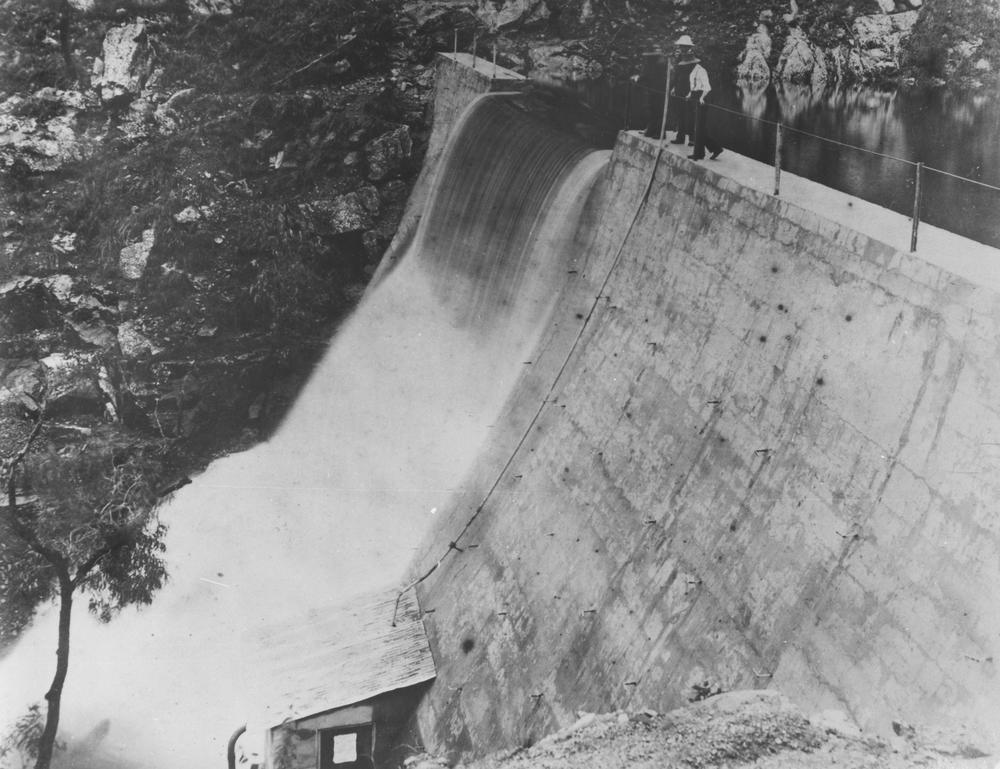
- Water spilling over the dam wall, in 1912. (Source: State Library of Queensland)

- Location of the dam in Queensland
- Interactive map of Ibis Dam
- Official name: Ibis Creek Dam
- Country: Australia
- Location: Irvinebank, Far North Queensland
- Coordinates: 17°26′02″S 145°12′59″E
- Purpose: Potable water supply
- Status: Operational
- Opening date: 1906
- Built by: John Moffat
- Owners: Queensland Government (1906–2013); Shire of Mareeba (since 2013– )

Dam and spillways
- Type of dam: Gravity dam
- Impounds: Ibis Creek
- Height: 17.5 m (57 ft)
- Length: 56 m (184 ft)
- Elevation at crest: 828 m (2,717 ft) AHD
- Spillways: 1
- Spillway type: Central uncontrolled ogee

Reservoir
- Total capacity: 225 ML (7.9×10^{6} cu ft)
- Catchment area: 610 ha (1,500 acres)
- Surface area: 4 ha (9.9 acres)

The Ibis Dam, officially known as the Ibis Creek Dam, is a gravity dam across the Ibis Creek that serves as a water supply for the town of Irvinebank, in Far North Queensland, Australia. Completed in 1906 by John Moffat, a mining entrepreneur, its construction was supervised by Tom Brodie, a Scottish stonemason.

The dam is located about 1 kilometre (0.62 mi) south of Irvinebank, connected by a 1.4-kilometre (0.87 mi) pipeline that runs north-west from the dam to supply two reservoirs located on a ridge above the town. Supply of water is gravity fed to each property within Irvinebank. The dam has been stabilised twice, in 1997 and most recently in 2013.

== Specifications ==
The dam wall is 17 metres (55 ft) high and 56 metres (184 ft) wide, and comprises a mix of mass concrete with rock core. The 13-metre-wide (43 ft) central uncontrolled ogee spillway at the 828-metre (2,717 ft) AHD crest, has weirs on either side to assist with flood mitigation.

== Structural concerns and change of ownership ==
In 2010, a structural investigation was initiated by the Department of Environment and Resource Management on behalf of its owner, the Queensland Government. The investigation uncovered significant structural concerns with the dam after many long-held assumptions about its initial construction were found to be untrue.

After twelve months of negotiations, a proposal was submitted to Tablelands Regional Council, now the Shire of Mareeba, to take on ownership of the dam subsequent to a Queensland government-funded upgrade. The government's alternative to this option was to decommission the dam. In January 2012 Tablelands Regional Council decided to take ownership of the dam and the government began preparations for its A$4.4 million upgrade. The handover was completed in July 2013, and the government provided the Shire with $700,000 to assist with the first five-years' running costs. Whilst the dam was repaired, the government assisted by paying water-carting costs.

== See also ==
- List of dams and reservoirs in Australia
- Irvinebank Dam
