= DreamLab =

Volunteer computing mobile app for medical research

- Developers: Vodafone Foundation; Transpire (CI&T)
- Release: October 12, 2015
- Stable release: Android: 3.9.6.4972; iOS: 2.6.8; / March 25, 2025
- Operating system: iOS, Android
- Size: 87 MB
- Type: Volunteer computing
- License: Proprietary
- Website: www.vodafone.com/dreamlab

DreamLab was a volunteer computing Android and iOS app launched in 2015 by Imperial College London and the Vodafone Foundation. It was discontinued on 2nd April 2025.

== Description ==
The app helped to research cancer, COVID-19, new drugs and tropical cyclones. To do this, DreamLab accessed part of the device's processing power, with the user's consent, while the owner charged their smartphone, to speed up the calculations of the algorithms from Imperial College London.

The aim of the tropical cyclone project was to prepare for climate change risks. Other projects aimed to find existing drugs and food molecules that could help people with COVID-19 and other diseases. The performance of 100,000 smartphones would reach the annual output of all research computers at Imperial College in just three months, with a nightly runtime of six hours.

The app was developed in 2015 by the Garvan Institute of Medical Research in Sydney and the Vodafone Foundation. In May 2020, the project had over 490,000 registered users.

== See also ==
- Volunteer computing
- Folding@home
- BOINC
