= Military commission =

Military commission may refer to:

- A commissioned officer's official document of appointment
- A type of court in military justice or martial law
  - Military commissions in the United States
    - Guantanamo military commissions for prosecuting detainees held in the Guantanamo Bay detainment camps.
- Central Military Commission, in communist countries responsible for the ruling party's control of the nation's armed forces

== See also ==
- Commission (disambiguation)
