= CZZ =

CZZ can refer to:

- Celanese AG, a former German spinoff of American chemical company Celanese, by Frankfurt Stock Exchange code
- Cosan, a Brazilian producer of bioethanol, sugar, and energy, by former New York Stock Exchange code
