= Rubens Ometto =

Brazilian businessman

Rubens Ometto Silveira Mello (1950) is a Brazilian businessman and the chair of Raízen and Cosan. He is also the director of UNICA.

== Biography ==
Rubens Ometto Silveira Mello was born in Piracicaba, Brazil. He attended the University of São Paulo and interned with Unibanco. After college, he became a financial director for the Votorantim Group, thanks to his mentor Antônio Ermírio de Moraes. He sued his family for a decade to own Cosan.
