= Abramo Eberle =

Italian-Brazilian businessman (1880–1945)

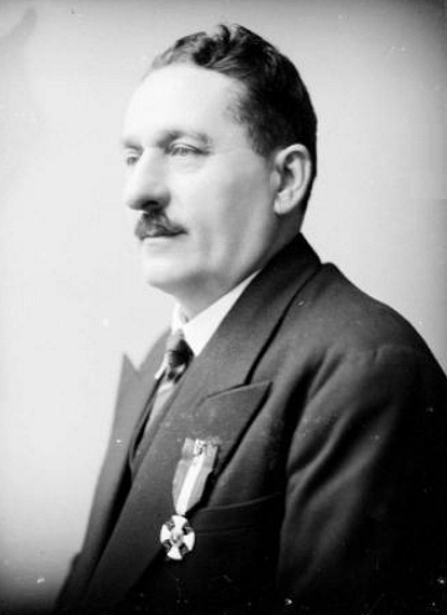
- Abramo Eberle in 1936, wearing the insignia of Knight of the Crown of Italy.
- Born: April 2, 1880; Monte Magrè, Schio, Italy
- Died: January 13, 1945 (aged 64); Caxias do Sul, Rio Grande do Sul, Brazil
- Occupation: businessman

Abramo Eberle (April 2, 1880 – January 13, 1945) was an Italian–Brazilian businessman and one of the pioneers of industrialization in the state of Rio Grande do Sul.

== Biography ==
Giuseppe Eberle and Luigia Zanrosso arrived in Brazil in 1884, in one of the first batches of Italian immigrants, and settled in the Italian colony of Caxias do Sul. Their four children came with them, including four-year-old Abramo, the second oldest. In Brazil, six more children would be born.

Giuseppe Eberle had prepared for immigration. Before traveling, he bought some alembics and boilers, anticipating that, in the colony, such equipment would be a valuable rarity; he also brought hats and fruit tree seedlings, as well as funds from the sale of his farm in Magré. Once he arrived, he acquired a rural lot and, one year later, a small metalwork shop owned by Francisco Rossi, on Sinimbu Street, where he also set up a business. On his rural lot he planted an orchard and manufactured grappa, while his wife, known as Gigia Bandera, managed the business in town. On weekends, Giuseppe worked in the city as a barber, a job he had in Italy. By 1892, the family also owned two other pieces of land, operated by contract farmers. Young Abramo, who was 12 at the time, supervised one of the properties and helped with the family's other investments. Due to the heavy workload, Abramo had a poor early education.

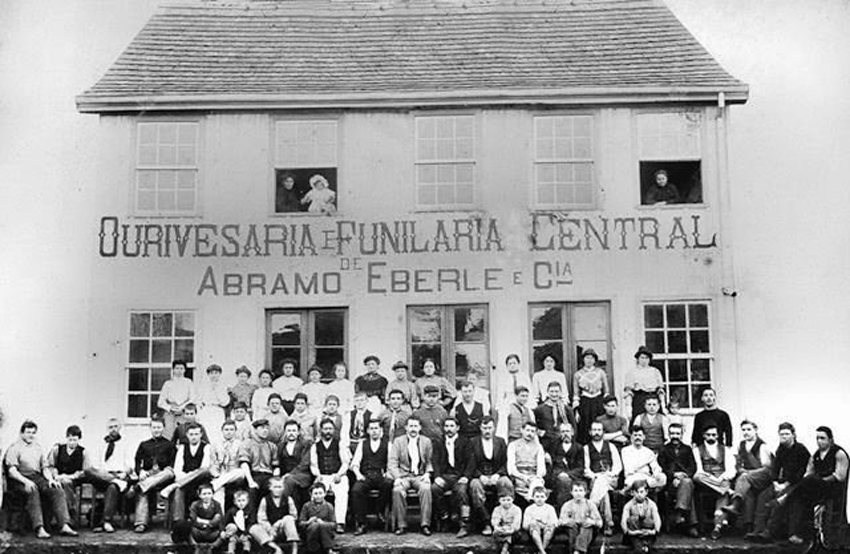
The tinkering in 1907.

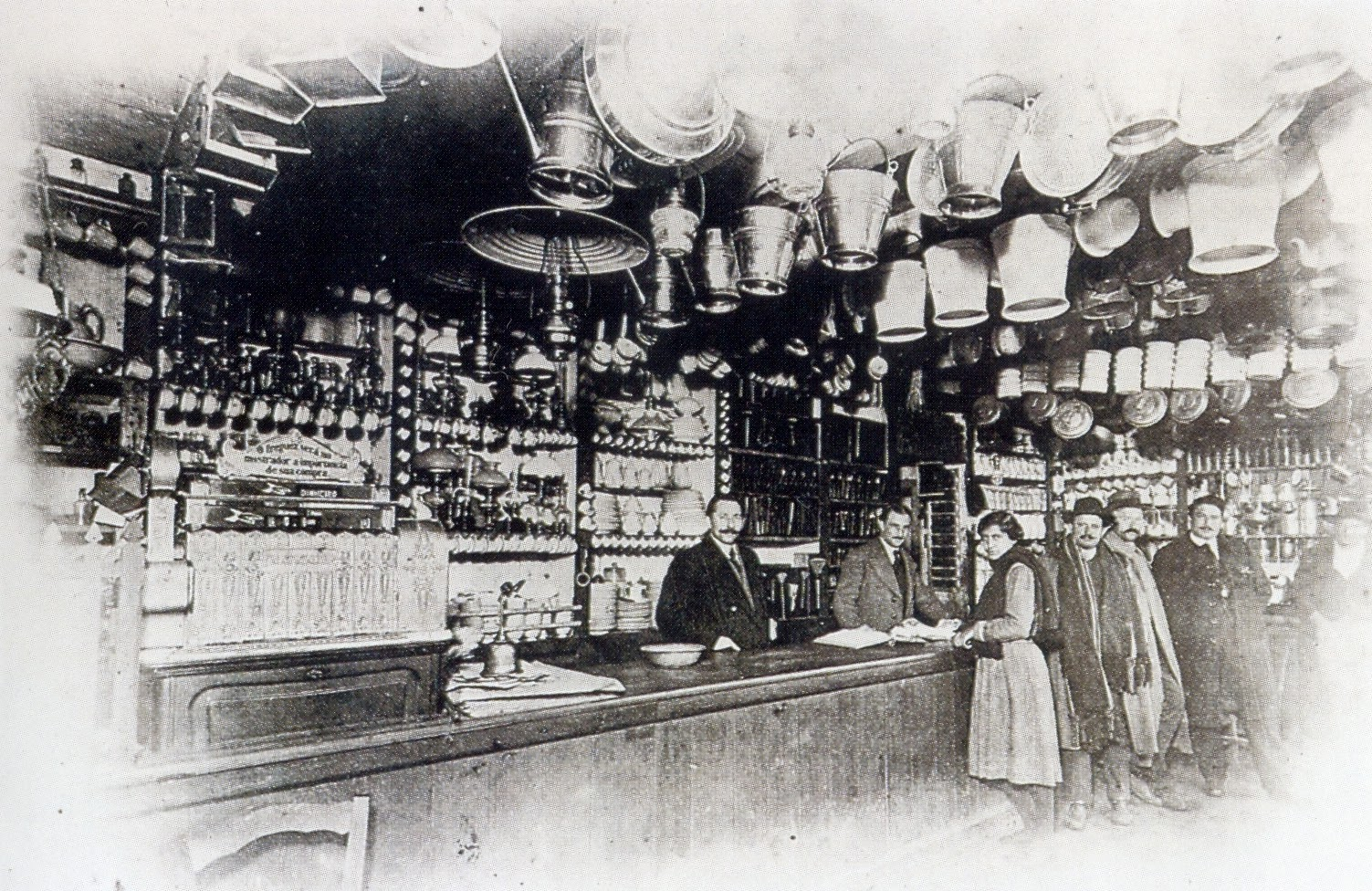
Interior of the commercial house in 1918.

In 1894, he began to dedicate himself mainly to the metalwork shop. When his father decided to sell it to concentrate all the family's efforts on agriculture, Abramo proposed to buy it. In 1896, at the age of sixteen, the sale was signed and Abramo Eberle became the owner. He made kerosene lamps, an item in great demand at a time when there was no electricity, as well as buckets, mugs, and other general consumption items. Following his father's example, he diversified his business, improving the metalwork shop with more efficient equipment and the commercial house with a good hardware section. He also opened a glass shop and started to offer general repair services, besides selling the agricultural production of the family's land both in Caxias and in Porto Alegre, to where he traveled several times. In 1901, his business was prospering and he began to invest in the São Paulo market, where he sold wine, grappa, salami, ham, and cheese.

In the same year he married Elisa Venzon, a member of a high society family and owner of a windmill and a sawmill, with whom he had José Abramo (Beppin, December 16, 1901), Angelina (04/01/1904), Rosália (January 31, 1906), Julio João (November 21, 1907), Adélia (June 30, 1910), who was the first queen of the Grape Festival, and Zaíra and Lília (April/1919). His wife would soon prove to be a skilled business administrator, allowing Abramo to travel frequently in search of new markets, suppliers and business partners and to establish himself as an important exporter. Pedro Eberle, his brother, was also a valuable helper who later became a partner in the business.

In 1904, he joined Érico Raabe, Pedro Mocelin, and Luiz Gasparetto in a partnership that merged Abramo's metalwork shop and a goldsmith shop maintained by Gasparetto, which originated the Ourivesaria e Funilaria Central de Abramo Eberle e Cia., established with an initial capital of 24.2 contos de réis, and sixty workers. In 1906, he joined the Merchants' Association, which gathered the local business elite and exerted decisive influence on the economy and politics of the entire region. In 1912, he became associated with Reinaldo Kochenborger to expand jewelry production. In 1917, with a capital of 800 contos de réis, the company was restructured with new equipment and installations, changing its name to Abramo Eberle & Cia., having as partners Luiz Gasparetto, Eduardo Mosele, and Pedro Eberle. The following year, the company started manufacturing tableware and cutlery objects. This was the beginning of the transition from a markedly handmade production model to a modern, automated industry model.

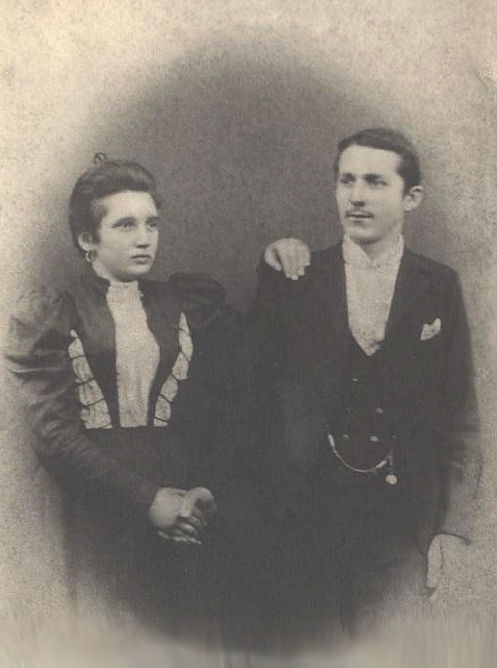
Elisa Venzon and Abramo Eberle in 1902.

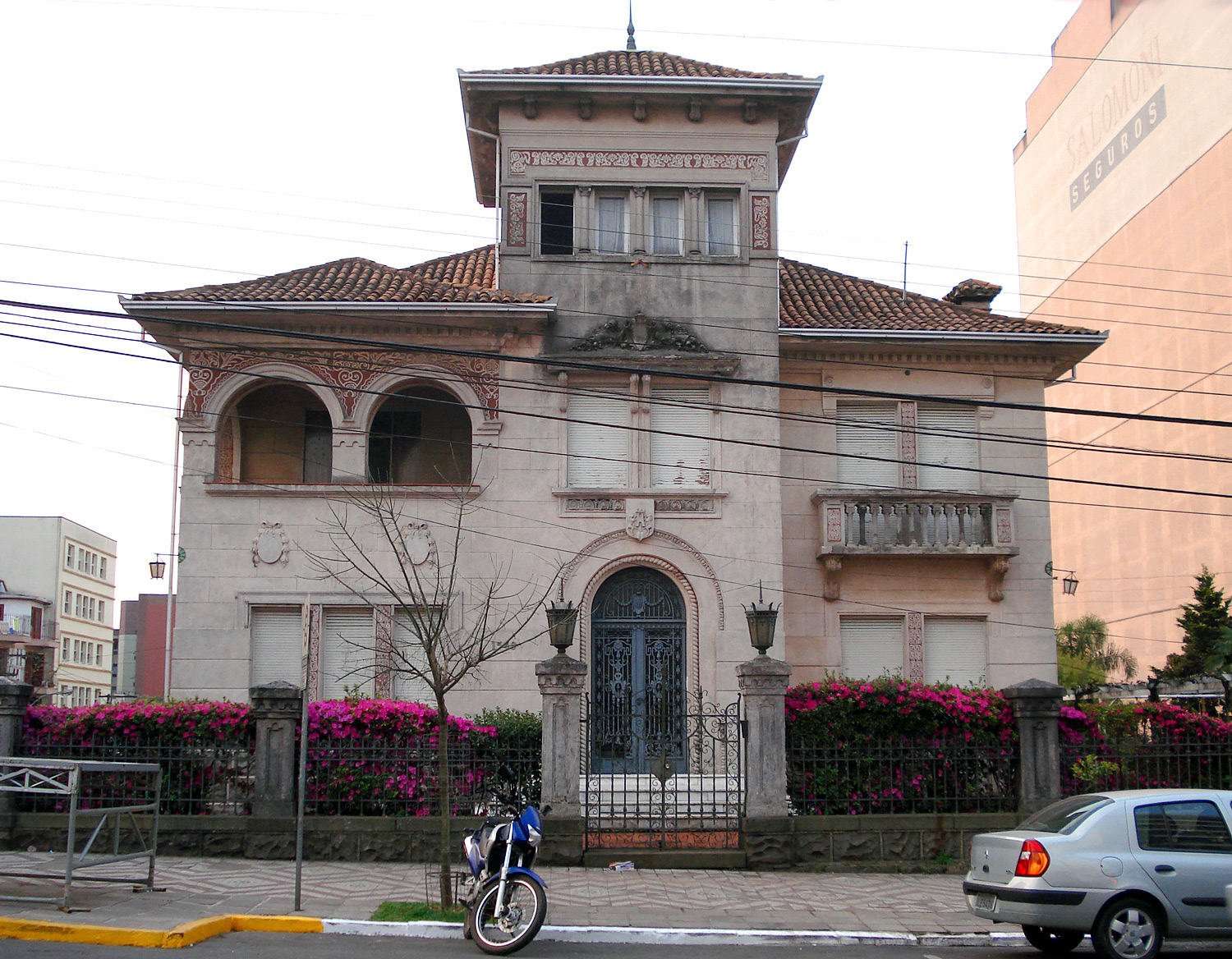
Facade of the Eberle Palace.

In 1920, Eberle, Mosele & Cia. was created, with partners Leonel Mosele and Fiorelo Arpini, expanding the hardware, chinaware and glassware stores. In the same year, Abramo traveled to the United States to learn about new technologies and sources of raw materials for metallurgy, but also to treat the health of Elisa, who suffered from a heart condition; there, Abramo also got sick. After four months they headed for Italy. As both were still ill, they spent a season at the Salso Maggiore water station, then visited Rome, interviewing the Pope, and then headed to Monte Magré to visit relatives. From there, they left on business trips through several cities in Italy and also Paris, visiting metallurgies and foundries, returning to Brazil after two years.

Between 1923 and 1928, the pushbutton and rivet factory was inaugurated, and the first forge was installed, where forged pieces, blades for knives, swords and rapiers for the armed forces were manufactured. The company's capital was already 1000 contos de réis and it already had either a branch or a representative in all Brazilian states and some other countries. In 1925, the manufacture of sacred articles began. Besides becoming one of the biggest businessmen in the state, Abramo got involved in politics, assuming the position of vice-intendent for several periods in the administrations of Vicente Rovea, José Penna de Moraes, and Celeste Gobbato, participating in municipal commissions to deal with various issues, and being a member of the Directory of the Liberal Republican Party. He received the rank of colonel in the National Guard and aligned himself with the fascist ideology, which in the 1920s–1930s had great penetration in the colonial region and played an important role in the formation of the collective identity of Italians, based on concepts of progress, discipline, work, and hierarchy.

From the very beginning, as was the custom of the time, Abramo established a paternalistic style in the management of his company, creating in it a community with a particular culture that, by virtue of the size of the company and of the employees, would exert a strong influence on the life of the entire city. He maintained his own consumer cooperative, a medical and social assistance department, a sports department with teams in fencing, basketball, nine-pin bowling, and other sports, a regionally important soccer team, Grêmio Atlético Eberle, and organized regular recreational, social, cultural, and educational activities for employees and their families. For many years, Abramo started his workday by personally ringing a bell in front of the company, calling not only the employees to work, but marking the routine of the entire central region of Caxias. The expression "Abramo já tocou" (English: Abramo has already rung) to signify readiness and command, became famous, and is part of the title of the biography written by Álvaro Franco called Abramo já Tocou... ou A Epopeia de um Imigrante. According to Anthony Tessari, although the discipline was rigid and the work was hard, Abramo made "the workers feel like part of a family, seeing the boss as a very close friend or even a father [...] In the whole period in which Abramo was in charge of the factory (1896–1945) the workers never promoted strikes or even organized unions". Valentin Lazzarotto said that the force of tradition prevented the formation of class consciousness among the workers; strikers could be punished or fired and leftist ideologies could not proliferate in the factory environment, a reality that was not, however, unique to Eberle.

With the outbreak of World War II in 1939, which made imports from Europe difficult, Abramo, in a pioneering venture, began to manufacture electric motors to meet the country's needs, conquering an important market and making a significant leap in its sales, which doubled compared to the pre-war period. At the same time, the metallurgical company was requested by the Federal Government to "serve the Homeland" in the war effort, producing swords, rapiers, and sabers for the Brazilian Expeditionary Force.

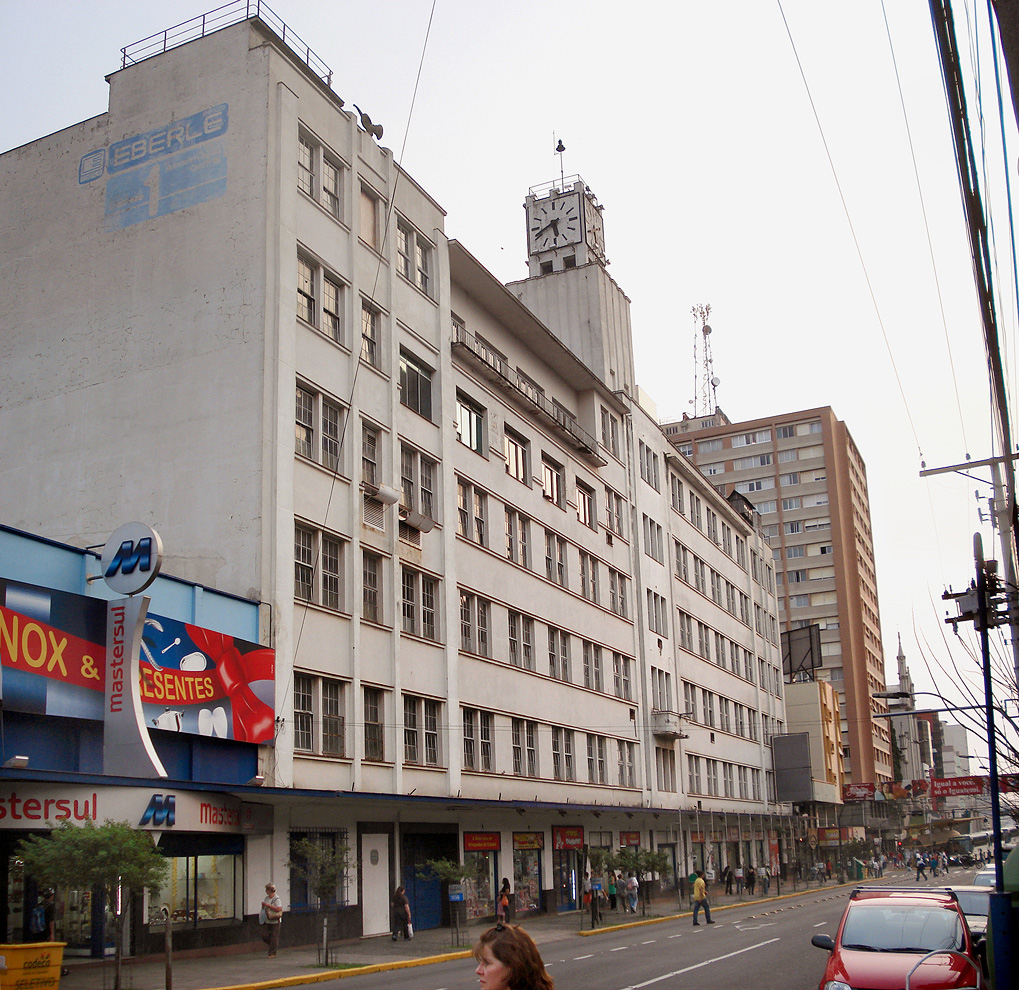
Former headquarters of Metalúrgica Abramo Eberle.

By this time, Abramo was already an illustrious and influential figure; he had been knighted in 1936 by the King of Italy with the title of Knight of the Crown, his company was seen as a model and stood out in Brazil, and received frequent visits from personalities of state and national projection, and even from foreigners such as the ambassadors of the United States and Canada, being invariably praised with enthusiasm. The military attaché at the British Embassy in Brazil, Colonel William Frederick Rohdes, reported: "The Englishman is usually a man of few words. But having visited the Metalúrgica Abramo Eberle mills I am willing to write a whole book about the fantastic force that the factory is making for Brazil". Among the countless products manufactured by the metallurgical company, it is worth mentioning the large ostensory all in silver covered with gold and jewels, weighing 70 kg, used in the III National Eucharistic Congress in Minas Gerais, and the statues of the National Monument to the Immigrant, cast in bronze from the model by sculptor Antônio Caringi.

Abramo would return to the United States and Europe many times to study modern production processes and implement them in his business. He was at the head of his industry for almost 50 years, until his death at age 65 on January 13, 1945, which caused a commotion in the city, leading a crowd to his burial. His sons continued their father's business until 1984, when Eberle was acquired by the Zivi-Hércules Group. In 2003, the groups were merged, resulting in Mundial S.A. On the top of the company's headquarters building, in downtown Caxias do Sul, a small wooden house, a replica of Abramo's first metalwork shop, shows how much the immigrant's dream has grown.

Abramo was favored by flourishing in a period of accelerated growth in Caxias do Sul, but while many other entrepreneurs in the city had meteoric careers that took them very high but went bankrupt in a matter of a decade or two, much of his continued success was due to his great adaptability to an economic and social context that varied greatly over the years, adopting production methods that were constantly being updated and frequently varying the product line according to the needs of the markets. The power of his company played a central role in the industrialization of the state's highland region, stimulating markets and partnerships and mobilizing a large workforce, which was a decisive impulse for the formation of the metalworking pole in the city, one of the largest in Brazil today. According to Loraine Giron, at its peak, Metalúrgica Eberle was the largest company of its kind in Latin America, making Abramo a living symbol of the success of immigrants and a "reinforcement for the myth that work makes one rich". In Tessari's words,

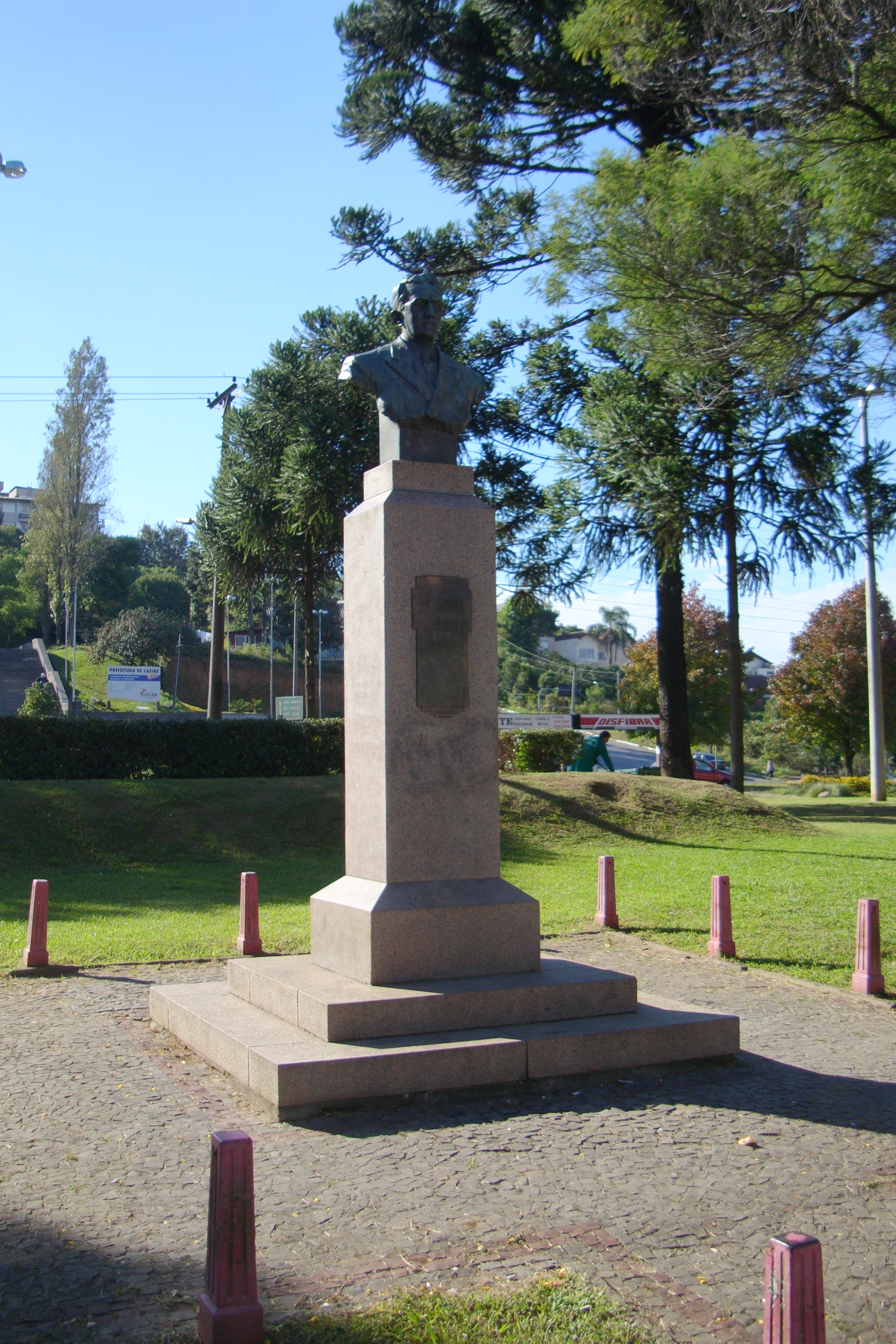
Monument to Abramo Eberle in Caxias.

The growth of Abramo Eberle's company is massive as it completes fifty years of existence. Abramo Eberle's role was fundamental for this achieved success: the result of his entrepreneurship and the paternal relationship he had with his employees. Furthermore, it is important to note the construction of a myth that served to reinforce the authority of the local businessmen: the idea of material and moral wealth conquered through hard but dignified human labor. On the pediment of the mill owned by the immigrant Aristides Germani (established in Caxias at the end of the 19th century), for example, a high relief announced: LABOR OMNIA VINCIT (work conquers all). On the facade of Abramo Eberle's new Metallurgical building, built in the first half of the 1940s, there was something similar: HONORABLE AND CONSTANT WORK WINS EVERYTHING. In the popular language, transmitted orally between generations of immigrants, the talian dialect proverbs, brought from Italy and developed in Brazil, also show the importance of work for that society, identifying its results, often miraculous: El sudore no lé mia santo, ma ndove el casca el fá mirácoli (Sweat is not holy, but where it falls it works miracles).

Luís da Câmara Cascudo remembered it poetically in 1948:

I read this beautiful Milagre da Montanha by Alvaro Franco and Sinhorinha Maia Ramos, also by Franco. The miracle is the city of Caxias do Sul, in Rio Grande do Sul. Campo dos Bugres, that ended up raising a forest of smoking chimneys to the sky, attesting to the uninterrupted labor of men. And another miracle is the effort of a little Italian, Abramo Eberle, 16 years old, buying a humble metalwork shop for six hundred thousand réis, in 1896, from his father. His first job was a tinplate lamp, a lamplight whose indecisive light brightened the first evening, stubbornly, in the cold night. Fifty years later, this lamp is a symbol, the initial force of fifteen thousand types of objects created by the magnificent hand that made it, tiny and faithful. Metalúrgica Abramo Eberle Ltda. supplies almost everything to almost all Brazilians. [...] Statue, party, street name, bronze plaque, money, baptism of a skyscraper, speech, banquet, ball, everything passes or everything remains without expression in the collective memory. The book remains. Above all, the book remains, telling the story of the man who worked, loved, and suffered. Abramo Eberle's industry will continue in the faithful hands of his children. The lamp will not go out. The book, true to life, will tell to the future the beautiful life of the forger who beat Death.

In Caxias do Sul, his name was given to a school and a square, where a monument was erected in his memory. He also named an alley in Porto Alegre, streets in Concórdia and Gravataí, the chair of Political Economy at PUCRS in Porto Alegre, and an Industrial Gymnasium in Osório. In an opinion poll conducted in 1999 among 100 community leaders from different areas by students from the Journalism Course at the University of Caxias do Sul, he was elected one of the 30 Personalities of Caxias do Sul – Highlights of the 20th Century. The historic buildings of her metallurgical plant and the palace where she lived were declared a heritage site. Her mother, remembered as a symbol of female entrepreneurship, was also honored, with the institution of the Gigia Bandera Trophy by the Union of Metallurgical, Mechanical and Electrical Material Industries of Caxias do Sul, a distinction that recognizes metallurgical merit.

== See also ==
- History of Caxias do Sul
