= Mundial =

Mundial ('worldwide' or colloquially 'world cup' in several languages) may refer to:

- FIFA World Cup, an international men's association football competition
- Mundial (album), by Daddy Yankee, 2010
- Mundial (magazine), a former Peruvian weekly magazine
- Mundial S.A., a Brazilian manufacturing company

== See also ==
- World IBJJF Jiu-Jitsu Championship, commonly known as the Worlds or Mundials
- World tango dance tournament, or Mundial de Tango
- Mi mundial, a book by Daniel Baldi, and a film based on the book
