= XMobots Apoena =

Apoena Series
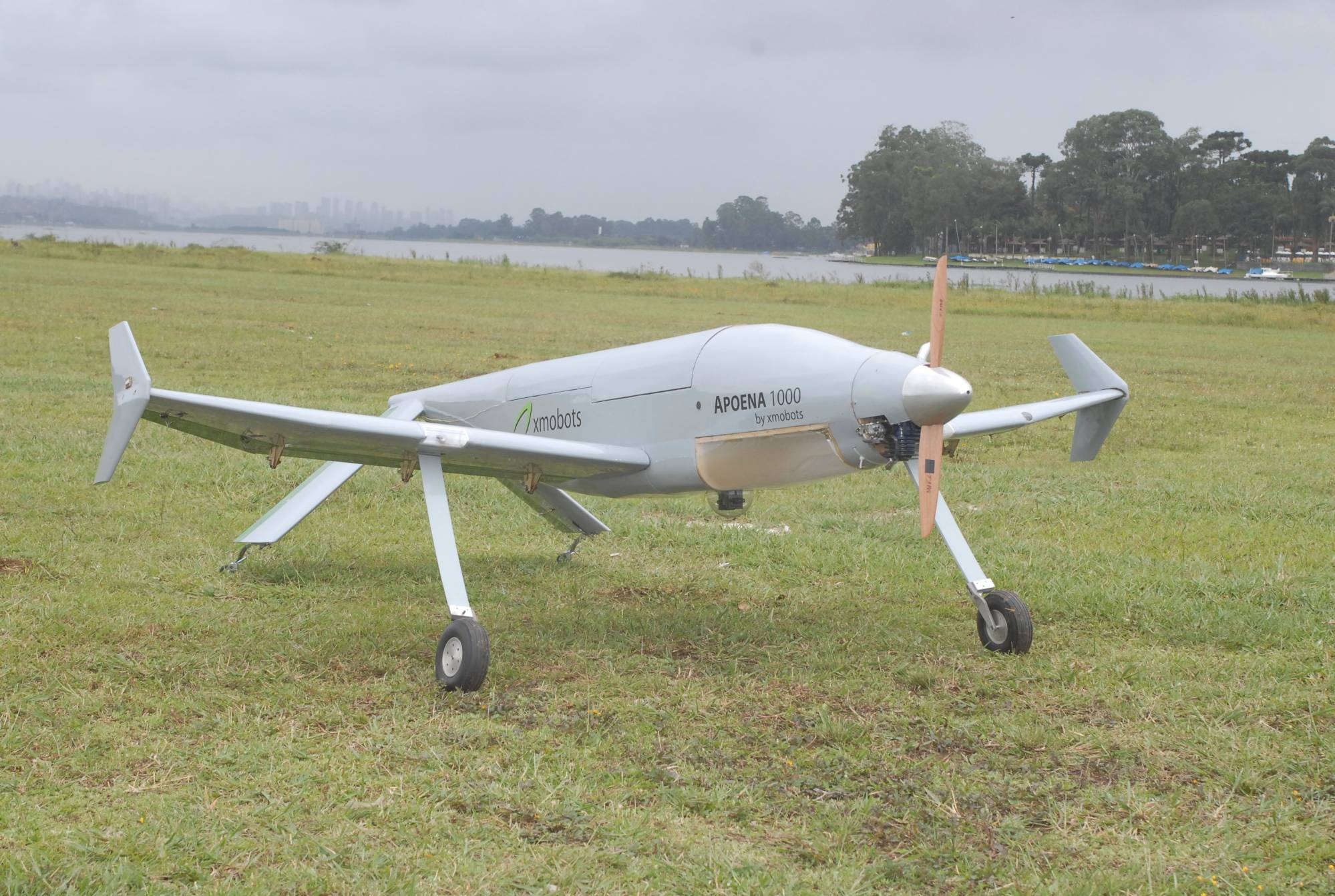
- An Apoena ready to fly.

General information
- Type: unmanned aerial vehicle
- National origin: Brazil
- Manufacturer: XMobots
- Status: In production

History
- First flight: 18 November 2008

The Apoena is a Brazilian Low Altitude Long Endurance (LALE) unmanned aerial vehicle designed and built by XMobots for several kinds of sensing roles.

== Design and development ==
The Apoena is a small monoplane built by XMobots with a composite and wood structure; it is powered by a 5.5 hp two-stroke engine mounted at the front with a two-bladed tractor propeller. First flown on 18 November 2008 the single-engined Apoena 1000 has a retractable landing gear and can carry a payload up to ten kg. It employs a slotted-flap high lift system, something that is very rarely seen in this class of aircraft.

== Specifications (Apoena 1000) ==
General characteristics

- Length: 2.66 m (8 ft 9 in)
- Wingspan: 2.51 m (8 ft 3 in)
- Height: 1.13 m (3 ft 8 in)
- Max takeoff weight: 35 kg (77 lb)
- Powerplant: 1 × 2 stroke , 4.1 kW (5.5 hp)
- Propellers: 2-bladed

Performance

- Cruise speed: 115 km/h (71 mph, 62 kn)
- Stall speed: 58 km/h (36 mph, 31 kn)
- Range: 60 km (32 mi, 28 nmi)
- Endurance: 5 to 8 hours
- Service ceiling: 3,000 m (9,800 ft)
