= Eberle Palace =

Historical building in Brazil

- Palacete Eberle
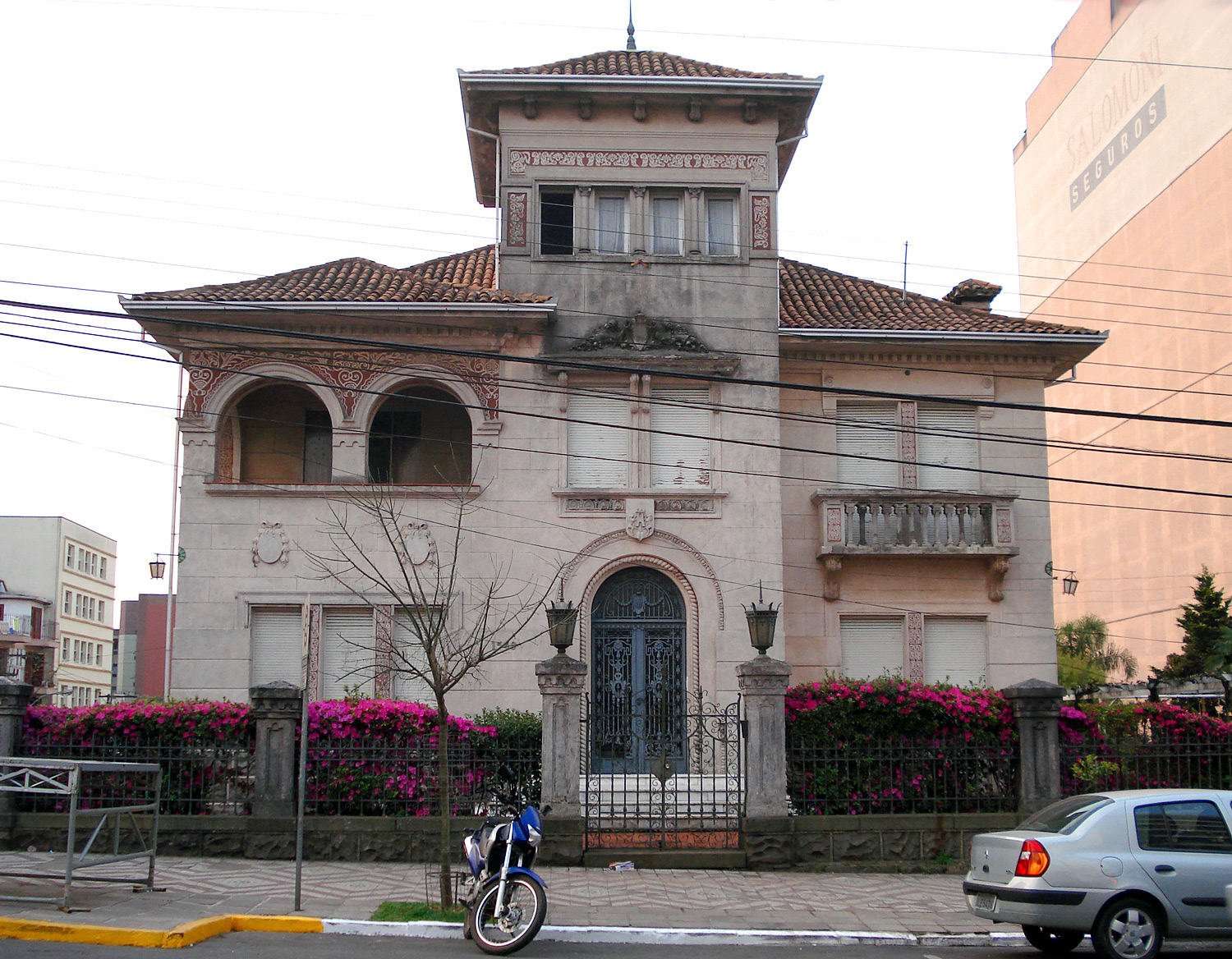
- Location: Caxias do Sul, Rio Grande do Sul; Brazil
- Coordinates: 29°10′07″S 51°10′37″W
- Type: Mansion

The Eberle Palace (Portuguese: Palacete Eberle) is a historic building in Caxias do Sul, Brazil, located at 1540 Sinimbu Street. It was the residence of the important industrialist Abramo Eberle, and is protected by the City Hall.

== Description ==
The palace is a sophisticated four-story masonry mansion designed by the Barcelos & Cia firm, whose construction began in 1938. It was the residence of Abramo Eberle, one of the richest and most important industrialists in the city, founder of the metallurgical company that carried his name and became renowned throughout Brazil. As a reflection of its owner's opulence, the mansion was built with decorative refinements never seen before in the city, in an eclectic style strongly inspired by Italian Renaissance palaces.

The volumetry of the palace is dynamic and asymmetric, highlighting the large entrance door, in round arch and frontispiece topped by the family coat of arms. The building also presents details such as the arcades of the third floor, decorated with floral motifs; the turret with friezes and Corinthian pilasters; the stained glass windows in some openings; the medallions that are spread throughout the facade; the splendid wrought iron work on the main door grille, the balconies with delicate balustrades, and the roof in several waters of ceramic tiles, which harmonically finishes the whole.

The first floor, which is not shown on the main facade due to the slope of the terrain, is clad in rusticated stone, while the others are covered with agglutinated stone dust. The palace is located in the middle of a garden, and the property is surrounded by a railing supported by decorated masonry pillars covered with stone dust. On January 6, 2006, it was listed as a municipal heritage site of Caxias do Sul.

== Reform ==
In 2020, the Eberle Palace underwent a renovation, and reopened its doors to visitors in September of that year. The architect responsible for the work was Adriane Bedin, a native of Caxias, who lives in Porto Alegre, graduated from the University of Vale do Rio dos Sinos (Unisinos) and has more than thirteen years of experience in restructuring heritage buildings. To preserve as much as possible the original characteristics of the palace, the professional proposed small changes, such as the installation of a hood in the kitchen in order to guarantee the restaurant's operation, the replacement of all the electrical wiring, the modernization of the hydraulic part, the application of transparent resin for protection and conservation of the wooden boards, the polishing of marble and granite by means of diamond pastilles with different granulations, and the restoration of the floor, the access stairs, and some furniture.

== See also ==
- Abramo Eberle
- History of Caxias do Sul
- Historic Center of Caxias do Sul
