= Lojas Riachuelo =

Lojas Riachuelo S.A.
- Type: Public
- Traded as: B3: RIIA3
- Industry: Department store
- Founded: 1952
- Headquarters: São Paulo, Brazil
- Key people: Flávio Rocha (Chairman and CEO)
- Revenue: ▲US$ 1.8 billion (2025)
- Net income: ▲US$ 92.4 million (2025)
- Number of employees: 44,000
- Website: riachuelo.com.br

Lojas Riachuelo (English: Riachuelo Stores) is a Brazilian department store company founded in 1947 in the city of Natal, Brazil. Currently, the company operates 302 stores.

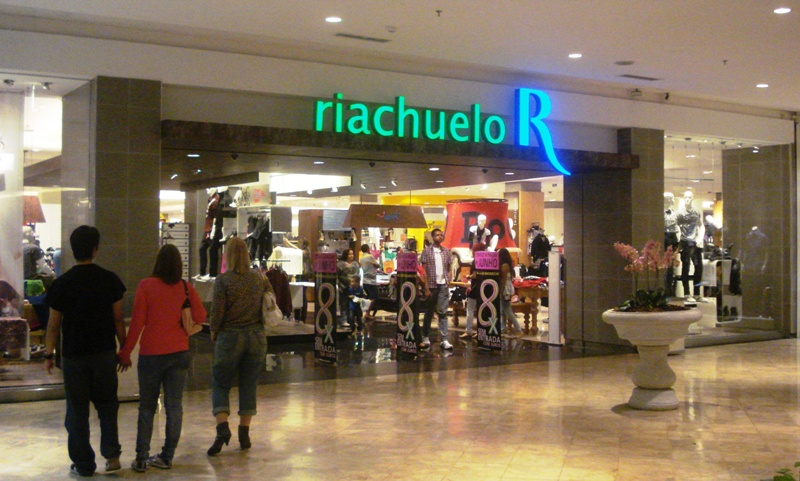
Riachuelo store in a shopping mall in Brasília

The company its headquartered in São Paulo and has 3 distribution centers, in Natal and Guarulhos (São Paulo).

In 1979, the company was purchased by the Grupo Guararapes, the largest textile group in Latin America which also controls the Natal shopping center Midway Mall and the financial company Midway Financeira.

The Riachuelo's major competitors are Marisa, Lojas Renner, Cia. Hering and C&A

The company owns and operates an Embraer Legacy 650 aircraft (as of August 2016).
