= Flávio Rocha =

Brazilian politician (born 1958)

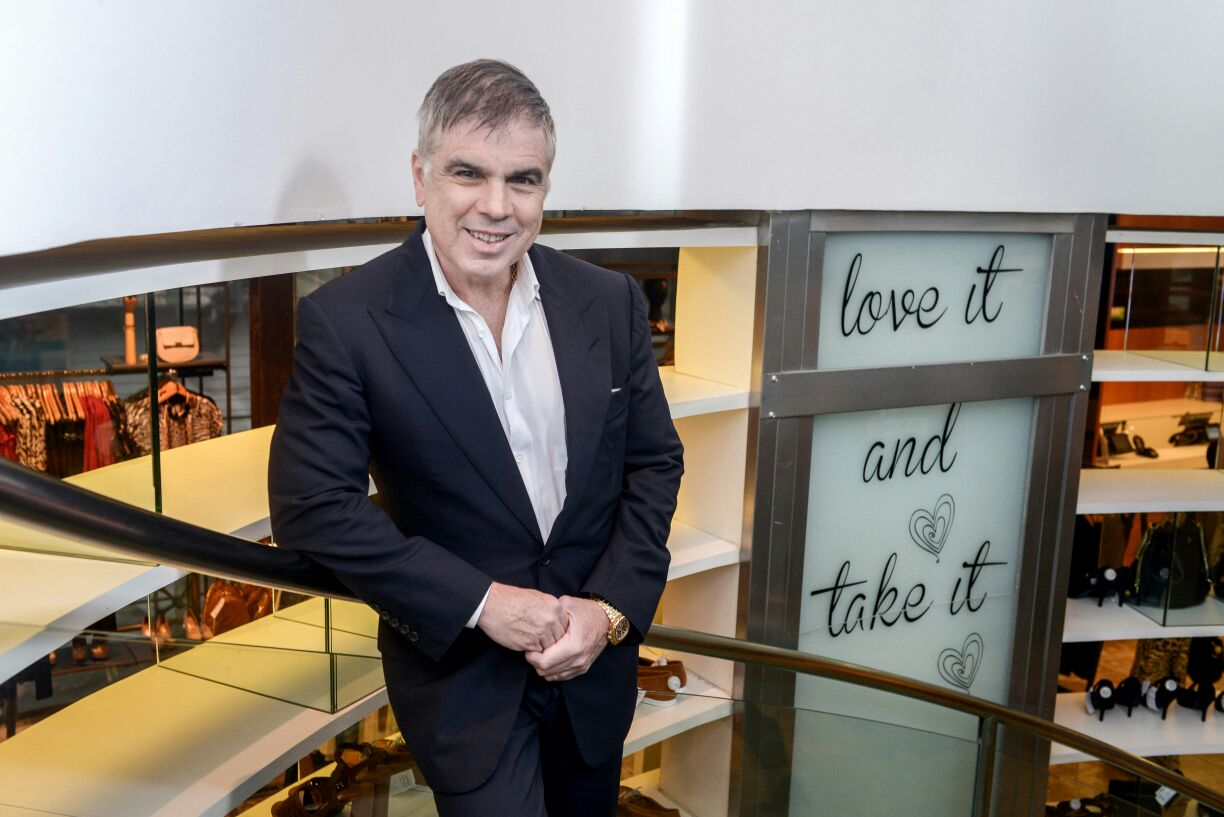

CEO and Chairman of Lojas Riachuelo
- Incumbent
- Assumed office May 2005
- Preceded by: Nevaldo Rocha

Federal Deputy from Rio Grande do Norte
- In office 1 February 1987 – 1 February 1995

Personal details
- Born: Flávio Gurgel Rocha; 14 February 1958 (age 68) Recife, Pernambuco, Brazil
- Party: Republicanos (2019–present)
- Other political affiliations: PFL (1985–1987); PL (1987–1989); PRN (1989–1992); PL (1992–2006); PR (2006–2018); PRB (2018–2019)
- Spouse: Anna Cláudia Klein (m. 1990)
- Children: Felipe (b. 1987); Flávio (b. 1991); Fernando (b. 1992); Fabricio (b. 1996)
- Parents: Nevaldo Rocha (father); Eliete Gurgel Rocha (mother)
- Education: Getúlio Vargas Foundation (FGV)
- Occupation: CEO and Chairman of Riachuelo
- Profession: Businessman

Flávio Gurgel Rocha (born 14 February 1958) is a Brazilian former federal deputy and businessman, current CEO and Chairman of Lojas Riachuelo, one of the largest retailers in the country.

== Biography ==
Born on 14 February 1958, Flávio Rocha is the current CEO of apparel retailer Lojas Riachuelo and of its financial services subsidiary, Midway Financeira. His family also owns Confecções Guararapes, the group's industrial company, as well as Transportadora Casa Verde, the Group's logistics subsidiary. Riachuelo is one of 15 biggest employers of the country, with over 40,000 employees (2017).

In 1986, was elected federal deputy for Rio Grande do Norte for the National Reconstruction Party (PRN), being reelected in 1990 for the Liberal Party (PL). In 1994, he attempted to run for The Presidency with the PL, but later formed a coalition to support the winning party, the PSDB, led by Fernando Henrique Cardoso.

Rocha and his wife are members of the neo-Pentecostal church Comunidade Evangélica Sara Nossa Terra.

== Political profile ==
Rocha defends the free market as a natural vehicle to fight corruption, and is one of the main defenders of economic liberalism in Brazil. He defends a smaller and more efficient Government.

In 2016, he received the Entrepreneur of the Year award from the magazine Isto É Dinheiro in the Retail category. A former federal deputy between 1987 and 1995, Rocha was one of the first businessmen to support the impeachment of former president Dilma Rousseff and the candidacy of João Doria to become mayor of São Paulo.

In January 2018, Rocha launched the manifest "Brasil 200", which defends a liberal economic agenda and conservatism in social values. The name is a reference to the 200 years of independence of Brazil.

Business positions
Preceded by Nevaldo Rocha	CEO and Chairman of Lojas Riachuelo; 2005–present	Incumbent
