= Forship =

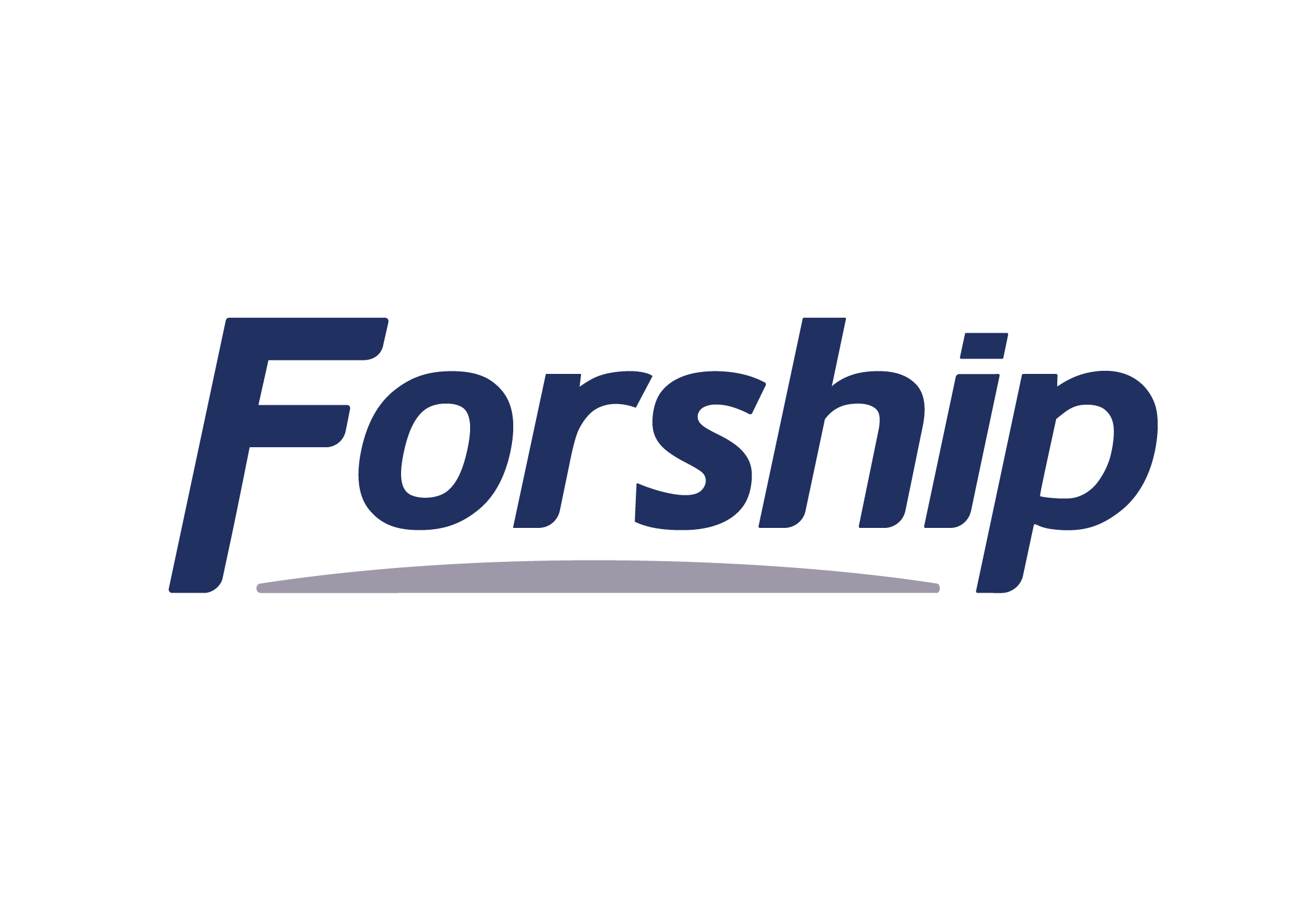
- Type: S.A.
- Industry: Engineering and technology
- Founded: 1998
- Founder: Fabio Fares
- Headquarters: Rio de Janeiro, Brazil
- Number of locations: Brazil, Netherlands, Singapore, Mozambique, Liberia, China
- Area served: Americas, Europe, Asia and Africa
- Products: Commissioning, Operation & Maintenance & Modifications, Technical Consulting, Construction & Assembly, HMSWeb Licensing
- Number of employees: ± 1500
- Website: www.forship.site

Forship is a Brazilian business group with strong international presence in the fields of engineering and technology. It provides services in commissioning engineering, management and execution, operation and maintenance (O&M), inspection, maintenance and repair (IMR), industrial modifications, owner's engineering, technical consulting, Brazilian regulatory compliance support, and licensing of the HMSWeb software.

Its activities are focused on industrial assets across segments such as oil and gas (onshore and offshore), petrochemicals, shipbuilding, energy (generation and distribution), mining, infrastructure, agribusiness, biofuels, fertilizers, pulp and paper, liquefied natural gas (LNG), and green hydrogen.

Forship currently has offices in Brazil, China, the Netherlands, Liberia, and Singapore. Its portfolio includes more than 700 projects in Brazil, the United States, Canada, Singapore, Malaysia, China, the United Arab Emirates, South Korea, Spain, Angola, and Mozambique.

== History ==
Forship was founded in 1998 by naval engineer Fabio Fares, in response to the oil and gas sector's demand for structured methods and tools for the management and execution of commissioning activities. Since then, the company has expanded its activities to other services and industrial sectors.

In 2006, the company established an office in Singapore to support its operations in Asia and the Middle East.

In 2007, through a spin-off of its IT department, Forship group launched the company HMSWeb Tecnologia da Informação Ltda, and began licensing its HMSWeb software to third parties — a tool designed for the management of commissioning activities.

From 2007 onwards, Forship expanded its international activities into Africa, with a presence in Angola (Luanda, Lobito, and Cabinda).

That same year, the company obtained ISO 9001 certification in commissioning management.

In 2008, it became a member of CE-EPC (Centro de Excelência em EPC), an organization dedicated to developing best practices in engineering, procurement, and construction projects. The following year, Forship published an article in EPC News magazine advocating for the recognition of commissioning as an engineering independent discipline.

In 2012, the group established Forship Mozambique, focused on providing commissioning services and developing integrated IT solutions for the local mining and infrastructure sectors.

Since 2013, the company's Integrated Management System (IMS) has been certified by independent certification bodies (DNV and Bureau Veritas), covering standards such as ISO 9001, ISO 14001, and OHSAS 18001 (subsequently replaced by ISO 45001).

Between 2013 and 2023, Forship expanded its activities into biofuels, pulp and paper, liquefied natural gas (LNG), and fertilizers segments. During this period, HMSWeb Tecnologia da Informação also launched a mobile version of its commissioning management system and established partnerships with Microsoft and AVEVA.

From 2020 onwards, operation and maintenance services became the largest share of Forship's portfolio.

In 2024, the group expanded its international presence with the creation of Forship Engineering & IT in Shanghai, China, focused on providing commissioning services and developing information technology solutions for the oil and gas sector.

That same year, the company expanded its Integrated Management System (IMS) to include information security and data protection certifications (ISMS), following the ISO 27001, 27017, 27018, and 27701 standards, applied to activities related to commissioning, operation, maintenance, consulting, and software development. Also in 2024, Forship joined the Energy Industries Council (EIC) and the Brazilian Association of Oil Services Companies (ABESPETRO), both entities in the energy sector.

Between 2024 and 2025, the company joined the United Nations Global Compact, participating in the Brazilian chapter of the Greenhouse Gas Protocol and publishing periodic sustainability and transparency reports.

== Portfolio ==
- Commissioning
- Operation and Maintenance
- IMR (Inspection, Maintenance and Repair)
- Modifications
- Technical Consulting
- Brazilian Regulatory Compliance
- HMSWeb Licensing, commissioning management software

== Group Companies ==
- Forship, in Rio de Janeiro (group holding company)
- Forship Internacional, in Amsterdam
- Forship Asia, in Singapore
- Forship China, in Shanghai
- Forship Liberia, in Montserrado County
- HMSWeb Tecnologia da Informação, in Rio de Janeiro

== See also ==
- Commissioning
- Commissioning management systems
- Operability
