= National Monument to the Immigrant =

Monument in Caxias do Sul, southern Brazil

- Monumento Nacional ao Imigrante
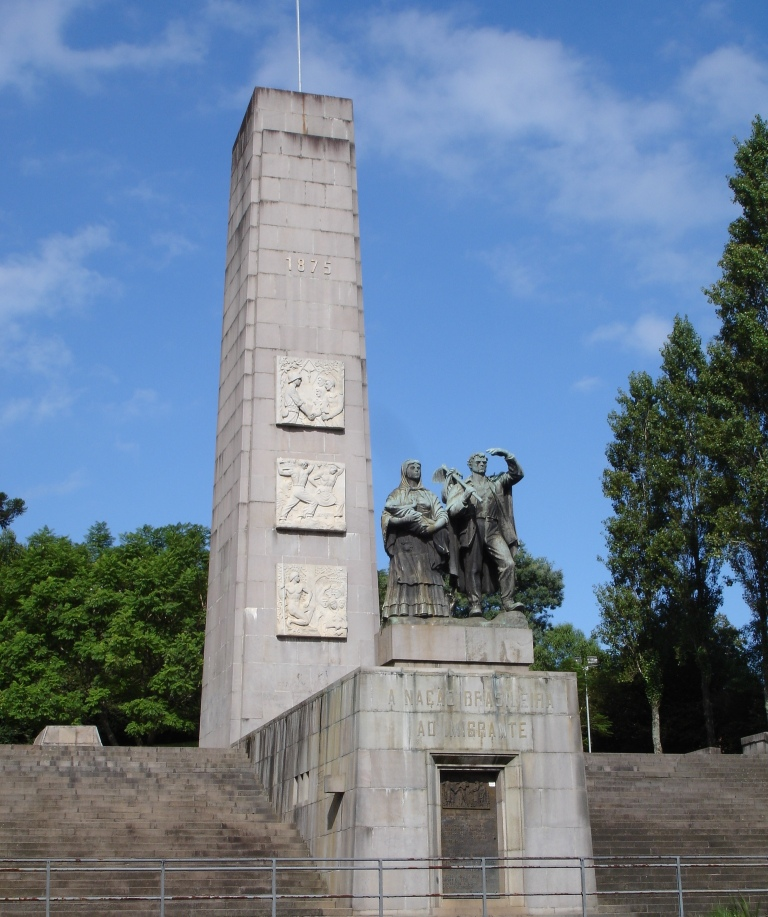
- Interactive map of National Monument to the Immigrant
- Location: Caxias do Sul, Brazil
- Coordinates: 29°10′2″S 51°9′29″W

The Monumento Nacional ao Imigrante ("National Monument to the Immigrant") is a monument in Caxias do Sul, Brazil, located at the entrance of the city, on BR-116. It is listed by the National Historic and Artistic Heritage Institute (IPHAN).

== History ==
The monument was the initiative of a community commission, which held a contest to define the best project dedicated to honoring the state's Italian immigrants. The project chosen was by the Rio Grande do Sul sculptor Antônio Caringi. Its cornerstone was laid in 1950 by President Eurico Gaspar Dutra. Building began in 1951, and the work was finished in 1954, being inaugurated by President Getúlio Vargas on February 28. The casting of the bronze parts was in charge of Metallúrgica Abramo Eberle, with supervision by Tito Bettini, and the masonry and stone elements are the work of Silvio Toigo and José Zambon.

The initial intention of the monument was changed by Law 1.801 of January 2, 1953, which determined that it should honor not only the Italian immigrants but all the ethnic groups that contributed to the settlement and progress of Brazil, becoming a national monument. On September 13, 1985, the monument was donated to the Municipality by the Pro-Monument Commission, undergoing several restoration works between 1999 and 2002.

The monument consists of a large bronze farming couple, with a child in the woman's arms. At their backs stands an obelisk with three allegorical images in bas-relief, illustrating land ownership, land cultivation, and the alliance between civil and military forces under divine protection, in addition to the date 1875, of the city's founding. On both sides, there is a staircase.

On May 18, 2016, the monument was declared one of the official symbols of Caxias do Sul. It also names the main commendation granted by the municipality, the National Monument Medal to the Immigrant (" Medalha Monumento Nacional ao Imigrante").

== Crypt ==
Below the sculpture, a crypt was built, whose door, also in bronze, has the image of Luiz Antônio Feijó Júnior welcoming the immigrants, framed by engraved verses by Cassiano Ricardo. Over the entrance, are the following words:

A NAÇÃO BRASILEIRA AO IMIGRANTE ("THE BRAZILIAN NATION TO THE IMMIGRANT")

The crypt, covered in marble donated by the Italian government, was originally a museum, but as of July 2004, it was also transformed into a cultural space, receiving the name Espaço Cultural Antônio Caringi, giving way to temporary thematic exhibitions. Currently, the Immigrant Museum is also housed there.

== See also ==
- History of Caxias do Sul
- History of Rio Grande do Sul
- German colonization in Rio Grande do Sul
- Italian immigration in Rio Grande do Sul
