= Raízen =

Brazilian energy company

Raizen S.A.
- Company type: Public
- Traded as: B3: RAIZ4
- Industry: Energy
- Founded: 2010; 16 years ago
- Headquarters: São Paulo, Brazil
- Key people: Ricardo Mussa (CEO); Rubens Ometto Silveira Mello (chairman)
- Products: Ethanol; Sugar; Electric energy
- Revenue: ▲US$45.5 billion (2023/2024)
- Owner: Cosan (44%); Shell (44%)
- Number of employees: 46,000
- Website: www.raizen.com

Raízen S.A. is the third largest Brazilian energy company by revenue and the fifth largest in Brazil. The company is a joint-venture formed in 2010 from the merger of the assets of sugar, fuel and ethanol derived from Cosan and Royal Dutch Shell in Brazil. The company has a market value of approximately US$0.8Billion in Set-24. Its revenue of about US$45.5 billion in the 2023/2024 harvest year.

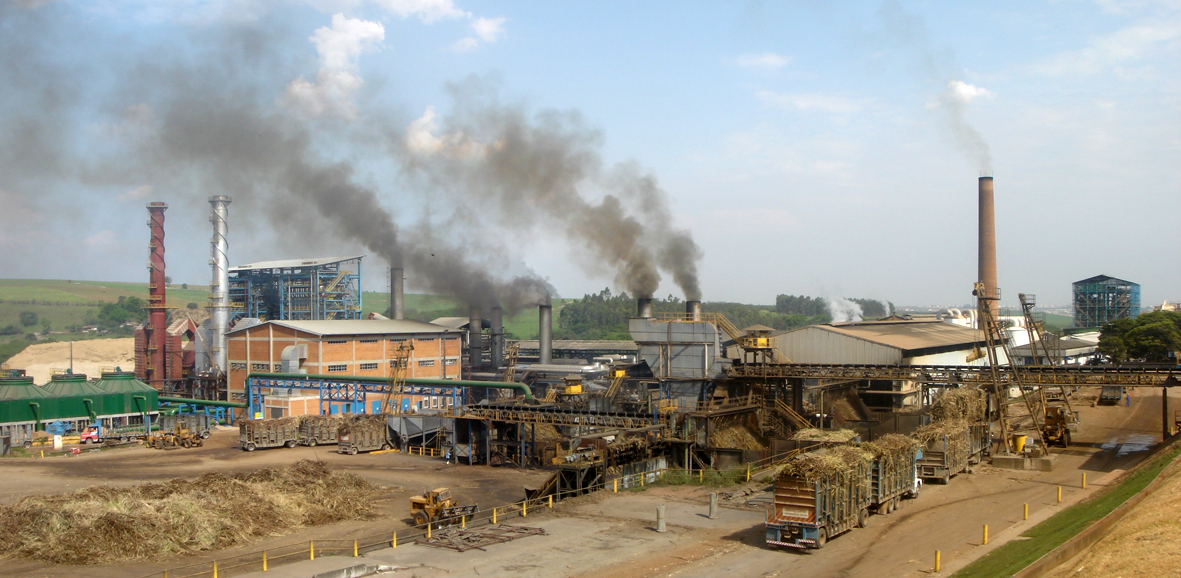
Panoramic view of the Costa Pinto production plant set up to produce both sugar and ethanol fuel and other types of alcohol. Piracicaba, São Paulo, Brazil

Raízen has a network of 7,000+ fuel stations under the Shell brand spread throughout Brazil and Argentina, more than 1,000 convenience stores and an ethanol production of over 2.2 billion US gallons (8,300,000 m^{3}). After merging with Biosev, the company now has 35 ESB (ethanol, sugar, and bioenergy) plants, with a total crushing capacity of 105 million tonnes of sugar cane per year, while also boasting 3000 megawatts of installed electric power capacity produced from sugarcane biomass (bagasse). Many of these plants were inherited from Cosan at the creation of the joint-venture, while several others were acquired from competitors as part of an expansion strategy. In the fuel trade business, Raízen trades approximately 31 billion liters per year in both B2B (mainly the transportation and industrial sectors) and B2C segments (through its network of 7,000+ fuel stations across Brazil and Argentina). It aimed to certify just under 1 million hectares of affiliated sugarcane production area under the Bonsucro sustainability standard by 2020.

In November 2019, Mexican multinational company FEMSA finalized a joint venture agreement with Raízen Conveniências, the retail division of Raízen, to acquire a 50% stake in the latter company, partly also to introduce the Oxxo convenience store chain (the largest in Mexico) into Brazil.

In June 2021, Raízen officially registered for an IPO with Brazilian securities regulator CVM. In August, the company raised US$1.3 billion, making it Latin America’s biggest IPO.
