= Cia. Hering =

Brazilian textile and clothing company

Companhia Hering S.A.
- Type: Sociedade Anônima
- Traded as: B3: HGTX3
- Industry: Department store
- Founded: 1880
- Founder: Bruno Hering; Hermann Hering
- Headquarters: Blumenau, Santa Catarina, Brazil
- Key people: Ivo Hering, (Chairman); Fabio Hering, (CEO)
- Products: Clothing & Accessories
- Revenue: ▼US$ 387.4 million (2018)
- Net income: ▼US$ 61.8 million (2018)
- Number of employees: 8,501
- Parent: Soma
- Website: www.hering.com.br

Companhia Hering (Cia Hering) is a Brazilian textile and retail clothing company, being the leading clothing textile company in Latin America. The company has 805 stores. The company is one of the oldest Brazilian companies still in activity, founded by German brothers Bruno and Hermann Hering, in 1880. It was founded in Blumenau, Santa Catarina, and its headquarters and major factories are still in this city. Hering is the major employer in the city (excluding public service jobs).

Hering exports its products worldwide. Currently, the company operates stores in Brazil, Bolivia, Chile, Paraguay, Uruguay and Venezuela.

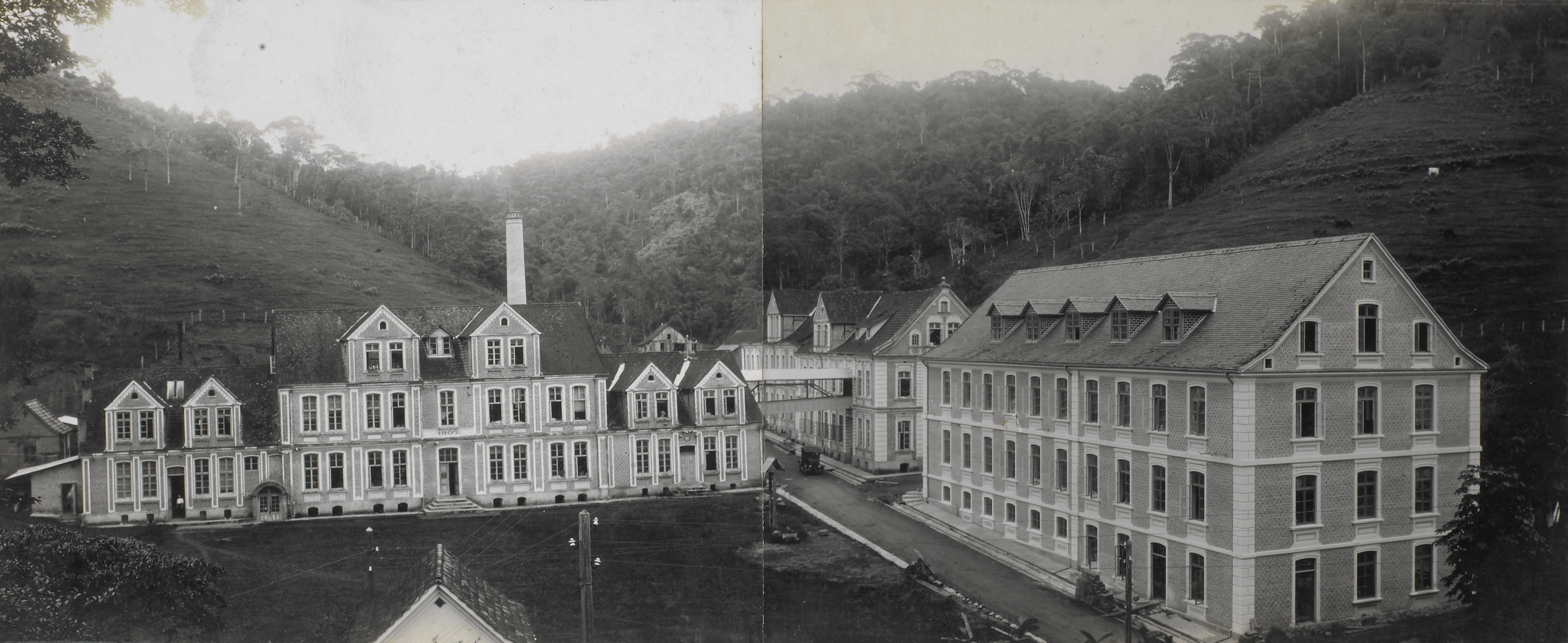
Factory of the Hering Company in Blumenau, 1920s.

== Brands ==
Cia. Hering brands are:

- Hering with 617 stores is the company's clothing brand best-known in Brazil. Its style is casual day and daytime.
- Hering Kids with 109 stores has the same characteristics as Hering, but is for children.
- PUC with 56 stores is also for children, but the clothes are more colorful and sophisticated. It has been already for more than 30 years in the market.
- Dzarm with 3 stores is a brand specialized in clothes and accessories for streetwear. The jeans and mesh are the main items of the brand. In 2007 it launched the fragrance Dzarm. Dzarm is part of the casting of the brand's São Paulo Fashion Week, the largest and most important fashion week in Latin America and one of the world's most important.

== Stores ==
Cia Hering opened its first Hering Store in 1993. Today there are 827 stores in operation in Brazil and the world, most installed in shopping malls, being 606 Hering Stores, 76 Hering Kids, 82 PUC stores and 1 Hering for you.

== See also ==
- List of Brazilian companies
