= Alupar =

Brazilian holding company

- Traded as: B3: ALUP3, ALUP4, ALUP11
- Industry: Energy
- Founded: 2007
- Key people: Paulo Godoy - President
- Website: http://www.alupar.com.br/

Alupar is a Brazilian holding company dedicated to the segments of power generation and transmission. Among all companies in this segment, Alupar is one of the largest in terms of Annual Permitted Revenue and the largest privately held company.

== History ==
In 2000 - Alupar started operating in transmission segment. In 2005, the company began operations in hydroelectric generation segment.

In 2007 - Merger of all transmission and hydroelectric generation companies in the energy sector into the same holding company.

In 2013 - The company had an initial public offering estimated at BRL 740 million.

In 2021 - Alupar reported net income of BRL 1,115.4 million. Alupar has infrastructure projects related to the energy sector in Brazil and other countries in Latin America such as Colombia, Peru, and Chile.

=== Shareholder structure ===
Alupar's shareholder structure consists of a 52% stake held by Guarupart and 48% held in the public market.

== Transmission Assets ==
Alupar currently has 30 transmission systems, totalling 7,929 km of transmission lines.

- ETEM
- ECTE
- ETSE
- ETEP
- ESDE
- EATE
- ERTE
- ENTE
- EBTE
- STN
- Transleste
- Transirapé
- Transudeste
- STC
- Lumitrans
- ETES
- TME
- ETVG
- TNE
- ELTE
- ETAP
- ETC
- TPE
- TCC
- ESTE
- TCE (Colombia)
- TSM
- ETB
- EDTE
- AETE

== Generation Assets ==
Alupar has diversified its electric power matrix by investing in activities of generation plants, such as Hydroelectric Power Plants (HPPs), Small Hydroelectric Power Plants (SHPPs) and Wind Farms.

- HPP São José
- HPP Foz do Rio Claro
- HPP Ferreira Gomes
- HPP La Virgen
- SHPP Queluz
- SHPP Lavrinhas
- SHPP Morro Azul
- SHPP Verde 08
- SHPP Antônio Dias
- Energia dos Ventos’ Wind Farm (Aracati Complex)
- São João (wind)
- Santa Régia (wind)
- Pitombeira (solar)
