= Commissioning =

Commissioning is either a process or service provided to validate the completeness and accuracy of a project or venture, or a process of identifying and prioritising needs in advance of planning of procuring public services.

It may refer more specifically to:

- Project commissioning, a process of assuring that all components of a facility are designed, installed, tested, operated, and maintained according to the requirements of the owner or client
- Building commissioning, a quality assurance process during and following building construction
- Building enclosure commissioning
- Ship commissioning
- Commissioning within the UK's public services e.g. the work of Clinical commissioning groups in the NHS

== See also ==
- Commission (disambiguation)
