= Módulo =

Módulo is a Brazilian company with international operations specializing in technology for Governance, Risk and Compliance. It operates in areas of software, consulting and education, offering, since 1985, security products. The company has offices in Brazil and operates throughout Latin America through a network of partners.

Since 1998, Módulo has customers from all sectors, and has participated in projects internationally recognized as the Brazilian electronic elections, the delivery of income tax via the Internet, the Brazilian Payment System (SPB) and the Pan American Games Rio 2007 (edition held in Rio de Janeiro, Brazil), and provider of software with technology for Risk Management, incidents and events.

In August 2016, SAI Global acquired Modulo International for US$6.8 mi, with exclusive worldwide license, except in Brazil, Angola, and Mozambique, includes the right to modify, use, and sell the source code with Modulo Security Solutions SA as the owner.

== Sources ==
- Rich, Jennifer L. (February 26, 2001). "Technology; Brazilian Company Is Hacking Its Way Up". The New York Times.
- "Modulo boosts 2002 sales to US$7.8mn – Brazil". Business News Americas. February 14, 2003.
- "Módulo: E-crime bill to enter congress – Brazil". Business News Americas. March 22, 2004.
- "Modulo first in world with ISO 27001 – Brazil". Business News Americas. February 3, 2006.
- Ozores, Pedro (October 26, 2011). "Gartner ITxpo 2011 watch: Modulo, UOLDiveo, Cipher – Brazil". Business News Americas. (subscription required)
