= Hidden Pousadas Brazil =

Brazilian company

- Company type: Privately held
- Industry: Hospitality
- Founded: 2008
- Founder: Alison McGowan
- Headquarters: Brazil
- Area served: Brazil
- Key people: Alison McGowan, CEO

Hidden Pousadas Brazil is a British company and website with operational headquarters in Rio de Janeiro. It provides international marketing and promotion services to independent Brazilian pousadas, including eco-lodges, bed and breakfasts, boutique hotels and guesthouses.

The company was founded in 2008 by owner and Hidden Pousadas curator Alison McGowan, a British expatriate. As of 2013, Hidden Pousadas Brazil listed over 400 pousadas on its site.

== History ==
In 2007, Hidden Pousadas Brazil founder Alison McGowan took a short vacation at a small pousada, Pousada Santa Clara, on the Brazilian island of Boipeba. She realised the potential demand for pousadas as a niche segment of the Brazilian hotel market and created Hidden Pousadas Brazil, with its website to showcase pousadas throughout Brazil to independent travellers. A draft blog was started in 2008 and the Hidden Pousadas Brazil website launched in January 2009.

In July 2011, Hidden Pousadas Brazil began its partnership with the Brazilian Association of Ecotourism and Adventure Tourism (ABETA).

In October 2012, Hidden Pousadas Brazil was awarded Brazil’s Ministry of Sports official seal of approval for the project Brazil, a hidden paradise yet to be discovered, which was accepted for inclusion into Brazil's promotion of the 2014 FIFA World Cup.

== Operations ==
The majority of pousadas listed on Hidden Pousadas Brazil have between 4-25 suites. McGowan personally conducts a site visit and writes reviews for all properties before awarding "highly recommended" status on Hidden Pousadas Brazil’s site.

Hidden Pousadas Brazil also produces Brazil Blog, a blog that shares information on new pousadas and destinations; and Brazil Travel Clinic, a blog that answers user-submitted questions about traveling in Brazil.
