= Commission =

Commission or commissioning may refer to:

== Business and contracting ==
- Commission (remuneration), a form of payment to an agent for services rendered
  - Commission (art), the purchase or the creation of a piece of art most often on behalf of another
- A contract for performance or creation of a specific work
- Commissioning (disambiguation), a process or service provided to validate the completeness and accuracy of a project or venture

== Government ==
=== Civil ===
- A government agency, regulatory agency or statutory authority which operates under the authority of a board of commissioners, including:
  - Independent agencies of the United States government
- An executive branch of government, often with characteristics of other branches of government:
  - Town commissioners, elected local government bodies established in urban areas in Ireland in the 19th century
  - City commission, a form of local government (common in the United States)
  - The European Commission, a body incorporating features of an executive branch of government and a civil service
- Presidential commission (United States), a type of high level research group
- Royal commission, a form of public inquiry
- Public service commissioning, the process of identifying an area's need for public services and then designing and securing the services to meet the need
  - Clinical commissioning groups, 135 NHS organisations in England responsible for commissioning healthcare
  - Commissioning support units, which provide regional support for Clinical commissioning groups

=== Military ===
- Commission (document), a document given to commissioned officers
  - Commissioned officer, who derives authority directly from a sovereign power; contrast with warrant officer and non-commissioned officer
  - Purchase of commissions in the British Army
- Ship commissioning, placing a warship in active military duty

== Other uses ==
- Great Commission, a tenet of Christian theology given by Jesus to spread his teachings
- The Commission (American Mafia), the governing body of the mafia in the United States
- Commissioned (gospel group)
- Commission of a crime, in law
- Committee, a body of one or more persons subordinate to a deliberative assembly or other form of organization

== See also ==
- Commissioner
- Board of Navy Commissioners
- Decommission (disambiguation)
- The Commission (disambiguation)
- Project commissioning
- Letters patent, an open letter issued by a government granting an office or other status to someone or some entity
