= Comgás =

Brazilian gas distributor

Companhia de Gás de São Paulo - Comgás
- Type: Public
- Traded as: B3: CGAS3, CGAS5
- Industry: Oil and gas industry
- Founded: 1872; 154 years ago
- Headquarters: São Paulo, Brazil
- Key people: Nelson Gomes (CEO)
- Services: Natural gas distribution
- Revenue: ▲US$ 1.7 billion (2018)
- Net income: ▲US$ 345.1 million (2018)
- Number of employees: 2500 in total
- Parent: Cosan
- Website: www.comgas.com.br

Companhia de Gás de São Paulo - Comgás is a Brazilian gas distributor focused on São Paulo state. It is Brazil's biggest gas distributor, with about 14.000 kilometres (8.699 mi) of pipelines to supply more than 1.7 million residential, commercial and industrial consumers in 88 cities in its concession area - São Paulo Metropolitan Region, Vale do Paraíba, Baixada Santista and Campinas Administrative Region. Comgas sells gas under a 30-year franchise, with a potential for a further 20 years.

Comgás was founded in 1872, and was wholly owned by the São Paulo state-owned power generation utility, Companhia Energética de São Paulo. In April 1999, CESP's stake in the company was sold to the British BG Group and to Royal Dutch Shell. Brazilian conglomerate Cosan owns 61.73% of Comgas's stock, and Shell 17.12%. The remainder is publicly traded on B3. Cosan acquired its stake from BG Group in November 2012 for $1.7 billion.

== Locations ==
In September 2021, Comgas has opened a new compressed natural gas (CNG) filling station in Taboao, on the border between So Paulo and Curitiba, to increase the supply for trucks and buses in Brazil.
