= XMobots =

Brazilian unmanned aircraft company

- Industry: Unamnned Systems UAV, AUV, ROV, USV, UGV
- Founded: São Paulo, São Paulo (2007)
- Headquarters: São Carlos, São Paulo
- Key people: Giovani Amianti, CEO
- Products: UAV, Unmanned Systems Components, Development Services
- Number of employees: < 20
- Website: XMobots.com

XMobots is a Brazilian company that develops and operates remotely piloted aircraft systems (RPAS). The company was the first to obtain permission of the National Civil Aviation Agency (ANAC) to perform experimental flights with RPASs in the country.

== History ==
XMobots was created in 2007 with the purpose of developing RPAS, also called Unmanned Aerial Vehicles (UAVs), with national technology. The company was born incubated in the Center for Innovation, Entrepreneurship and Technology of The São Paulo University (CIETEC-USP) from a R&D project of its founders. At that time, they were master's degree students at the Polytechnic School of the University of São Paulo (POLI-USP). During its first three years, XMobots created the RPAS Apoena 1000B, a 32 kilos aircraft known as the first UAV to fly over the Amazon. In that occasion, XMobots used the Apoena to do the aerial monitoring at the power plant of Jirau, a hydroelectric power plant under construction in the Madeira River. This operation was carried out between 2010 and 2013, and in this period, the RPAS was responsible to chart and quantify the legal deforestation that happened in a 1.000 km^{2} area, a record area considering any aerial survey already done in Brazil by an UAV.

In 2011, the company left the incubator and transferred the Head Office to the city of São Carlos (in the state of São Paulo), a city considered as the 2nd Brazilian aeronautical pole. This was a strategic decision as the city has a campus of the Federal University of São Carlos (UFSCAR), two campuses of the University of São Paulo (USP), two units of The Brazilian Agriculture Research Company (EMBRAPA) and many other important institutions of research.

In 2012, XMobots launched Nauru 500A, an RPAS of 15 kilos, robust and with a high performance for the mapping and inspection of areas up to 10 thousand hectares. With this RPAS, the company got from ANAC the first Experimental Flight Certificate (CAVE) for a private UAV for civilian use in Brazil.

In 2013, XMobots launched its third product, the Echar 20A, the first RPAS developed in Brazil with automatic launch and landing. With only seven kilos, the RPAS was designed for the mapping and inspection of areas up to 3 thousand hectares. The company got the CAVE for this model in December 2013.

== Products ==
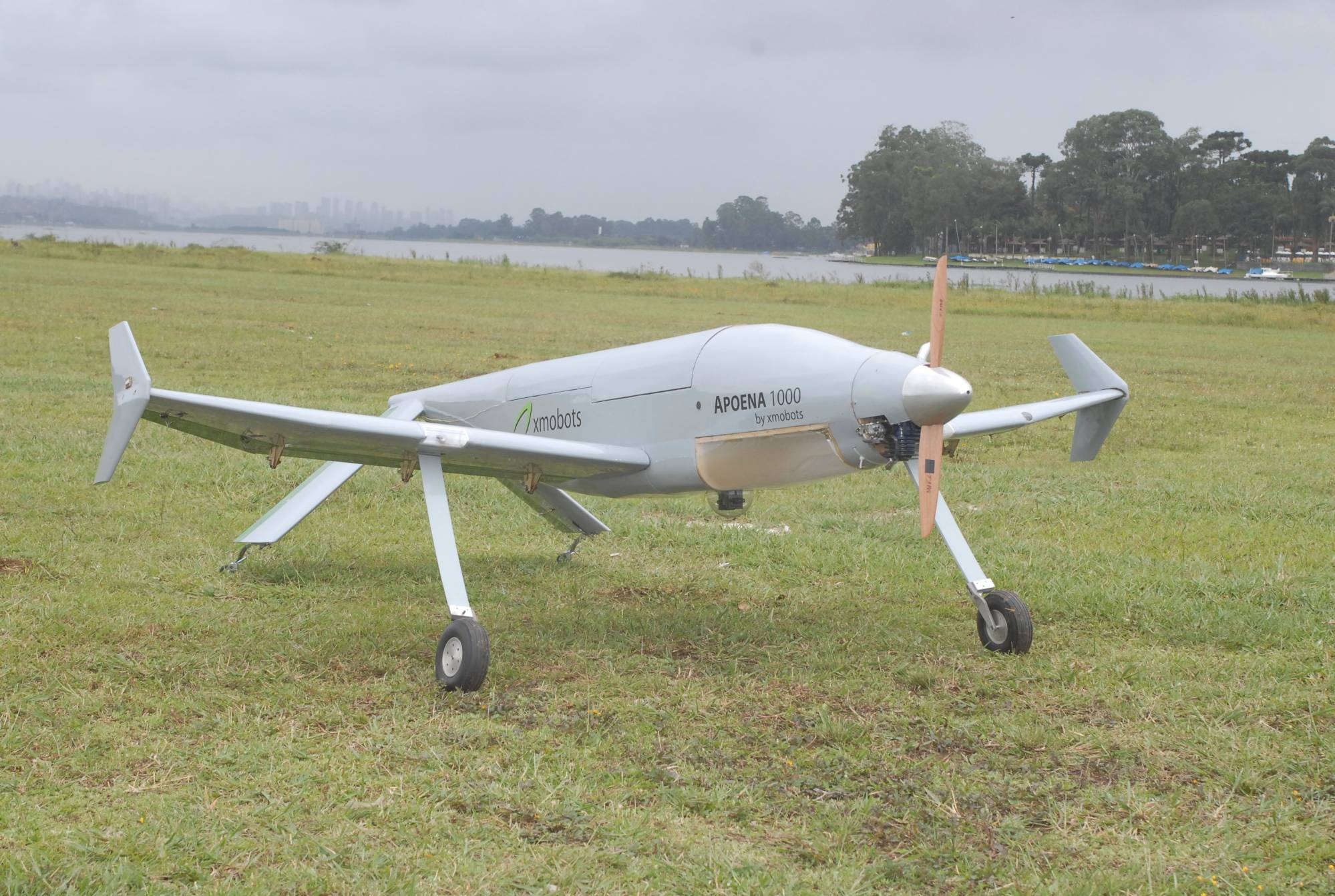
An Apoena UAV ready to fly

- Apoena 1000B

The first RPAS developed by XMobots, the Apoena was the first RPAS to fly over the Amazon. With 32 kilos, the RPA has the autonomy of 8 hours and a maximum communication range of up to 60 km, cruise speed of 115 km/h and it can reach a height of up to 3 thousand meters.

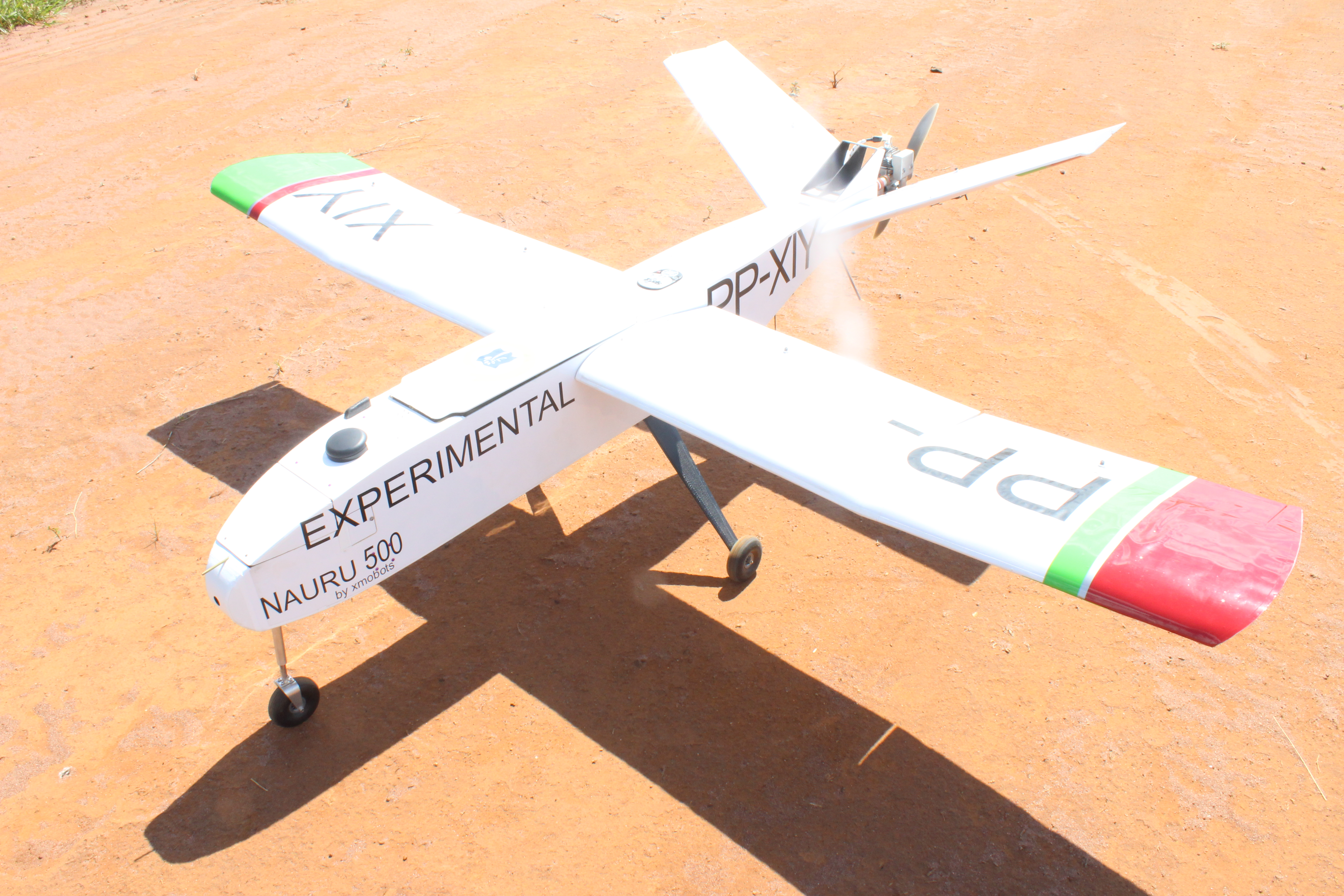
Nauru

- Nauru 500A

An RPAS with high performance for mapping and inspecting areas of up to 10 thousand hectares. First Brazilian RPAS that had a CAVE granted by ANAC, the RPA has 15 kilos, flight autonomy of 5.5 hours, and a maximum communication range of up to 30 km, cruise speed of 108 km/h and it can reach a height of up to 3 thousand meters. Its camera allows the aircraft to do aerial surveys with a resolution of up to 2.5 centimeters per pixel (18 Mpx camera).

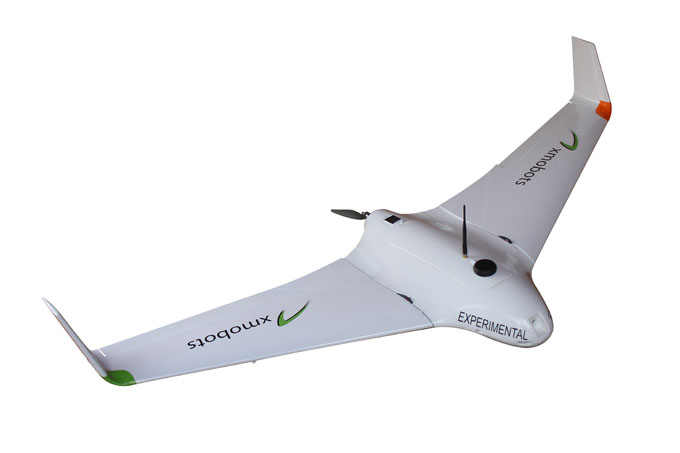
Echar, the first RPAS developed in Brazil with automatic launch and landing

- Echar 20A

This RPA belongs to the category of mini RPAS, doing aerial surveys in areas up to 3 thousand hectares. National RPAS with automatic launch and landing, the aircraft has 7 kilos, flight autonomy of up to 70 minutes, maximum communication range of up to 10 km, cruise speed of 75 km/h and it can reach a height of up to 3 thousand meters.

== CAVE/ANAC ==
In May 2013, the National Civil Aviation Agency granted to the RPAS NAURU 500A, developed by XMobots, the first Experimental Flight Certificate to an RPAS made in Brazil. With that, XMobots was the first company with an authorization from ANAC to perform experimental flights with a private and civilian RPAS, with the purpose of research and development. The CAVE highlighted the company's efforts to contribute to the regulation of the sector. It also demonstrated a high level of maturity of the Brazilian industry in the development of RPASs. At the time of the CAVE issue, the ANAC Manager of Aeronautical Product Certification Branch, Hélio Tarquinio, highlighted that the Agency considers that a relevant issue and is working to facilitate the operations of this new type of aircraft in Brazil, "with the focus on the ANAC mission, which is to promote safety and excellence of the civil aviation system".
