= Telequartz =

The Telequartz Group of Mining Companies, founded by João Cosac in 1926, is Brazil's largest, longest-established and best-qualified miner, processor and exporter of rock crystals. Working also with other minerals, the group is the largest exporter of quartz in the world nowadays. Brazil is estimated to have 53 Mmt of reserves representing 95% of the known world supply.

== The company ==
Known as the most qualified mining group for its operational structure, with the largest rock crystals stocks of the world, and experience in processing and exporting this mineral, Telequartz is the world leader in quartz market, exporting tons to Americas, Europe and Asia. Having capitalist giants, like Samsung, Swarovski and Concord, among their clients, the group operates its own mines located in quartz-rich areas of Bahia, Minas Gerais and Goiás states. Silica Sand Mining Company, also part of the group, have an agreement with Companhia Vale do Rio Doce for producing 10.000 tons of ferrosilica by year.

== Entering the industrial sector ==
- In 1975, Telequartz Group, financed X-tal do Brasil factory producing oscillators and high quality optic fiber made by their own artificial quartz produced in laboratory.
- In 1988, Telequartz reached a joint venture with CVRD and Nisso Iwai Ltd. to build a U$20 million quartz powder plant in Minas Gerais, Brazil. The powder is an important constituent in the production of optic fibers, crucibles, oscillators, solar cells, wafers and integrated circuit packing, and ceramic materials of exceptional purity.
