= AstralSat =

Satellite television service in Brazil

AstralSat, also known as DTH Interactive Telecomunicação Ltda, is or was a satellite television service in Brazil that was the first such service in that country to offer prepaid subscription TV.

It reportedly suspended operations in 2010.

The service launched a plan of 12 channels for R$30 per month. The channels offered were TNT, Cartoon Network, Boomerang, TCM, Canal Brasil, TV Climatempo, Discovery Channel, Discovery Kids, Animal Planet, People + Arts, BandNews and BandSports.

The service removed five channels from its service without explanation in August 2005 and lowered the price to R$20 per month. The current channel lineup is: TNT, Cartoon Network, Boomerang, Discovery Channel, Discovery Kids, Animal Planet, TCM and TV Aparecida.

With a receiver provided by the operator, it is possible to receive digital signals transmitted from the satellite Brasilsat B1. Currently there are 21 digital television channels open on Brasilsat B1 and eight more AstralSat channels remaining.

Unlike other television providers, AstralSat does not require subscribers to pay every month. Instead, it offers a prepayment plan in which the client stores credits on his or her card. AstralSet aims to attain 100,000 subscribers and to offer 36 channels.
