= Global Táxi Aéreo =

Global Taxi Aéreo
- Founded: São Paulo, Brazil
- Headquarters: Congonhas Airport
- Area served: Worldwide
- Website: Global Táxi Aéreo

Global (formerly Global Taxi Aéreo) is a Brazilian airline specialising in air charter and aircraft maintenance. Its main base is in São Paulo at Congonhas Airport.
