= CI&T =

IT company

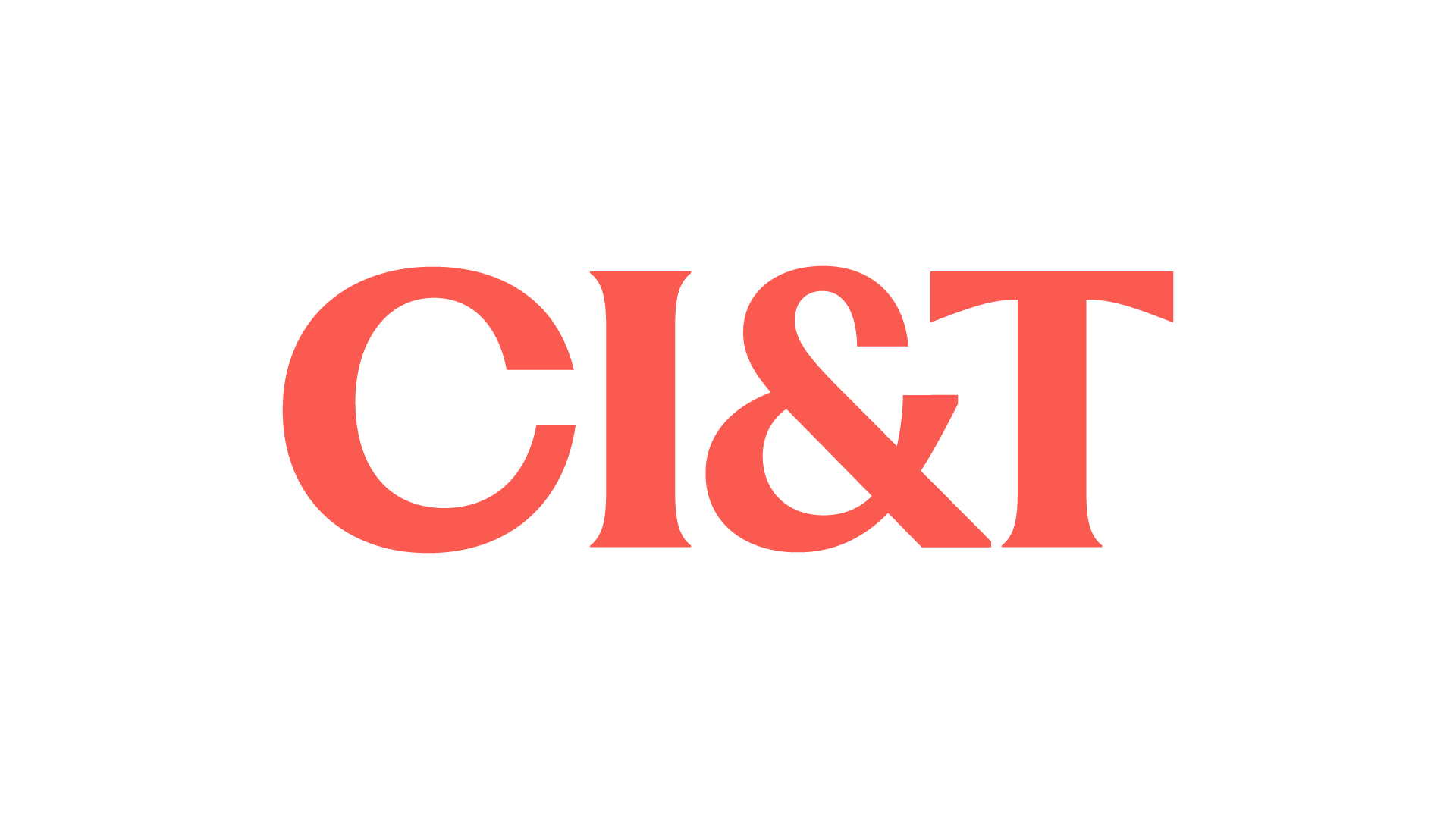
- Company type: Public
- Traded as: NYSE: CINT
- Industry: Information technology
- Founded: 1995
- Headquarters: Campinas, São Paulo, Brazil; Oakland, California, United States
- Key people: César Gon (CEO); Bruno Guicardi (President); Stanley Rodrigues (CFO)
- Revenue: ▲ R$ 571.8 million (2023)
- Net income: R$ 571.8 milhões
- Number of employees: 6,000+
- Website: ciandt.com

CI&T is a Brazilian information technology and software development company.

== History ==
CI&T was founded in 1995 as an IT group working with research and development (R&D) companies for software development before expanding to provide technical services to nearshore customers. Early clients included IBM, Hewlett-Packard, Vale, Natura, and Globo.

CI&T opened an office in Pennsylvania in 2006 and in Tokyo (Japan) and Ningbo (China) in 2009.

CI&T has been working as a technical integrator of digital marketing engagements with many of their clients. In 2017, CI&T acquired Conrade, a solution provider based in Oakland, in the United States. In 2019, Advent acquired 30% of CI&T participation from BNDES.

In June 2021, it announced the acquisition of Dextra, an IT services company headquartered in Campinas, near CI&T geographically. In November 2021, the company filed for an initial public offering and got listed on New York Stock Exchange (NYSE).

In 2022, CI&T announced the acquisition of three companies. The first was UK-headquartered Somo Global Ltd, an award-winning digital product agency, for US$67 million. Then came Box 1824. After that, in August 2022 the company acquired Transpire, an Australian-based technology consultancy, for US$16,4 million.
