= Decommissioning =

Decommissioning or decommissioned may refer to:

== Infrastructure ==
- Nuclear decommissioning, the process of closing a nuclear facility
- Decommissioned highway, a disused road or one removed of numbered highway status
- Greenfield status, a decommissioned industrial site considered back to its pre-establishment condition
- Base Realignment and Closure of US military bases

== Military ==
- Ship decommissioning
  - Ship-Submarine Recycling Program, a U.S. Navy process for decommissioning nuclear vessels
- Demobilization, decommissioning of military personnel
- Disarmament
  - Decommissioning in Northern Ireland, disarmament as part of that country's peace process circa 1998–2001
- Decommissioning pennant, a type of naval flag

== Television episodes ==
- "Decommissioned" (Star Wars: The Bad Batch), 2021
- "Decommissioned" (The Crown), 2022

== See also ==
- Commission (disambiguation)
- End-of-life (product)
- Planned obsolescence
