= Mundial S.A. =

Mundial S.A. Produtos de Consumo
- Company type: Sociedade Anônima
- Traded as: B3: MNDL3, MNDL4
- Industry: Manufacturing
- Founded: 1896
- Headquarters: São Paulo, Brazil
- Key people: Michael Ceitlin, (Chairman & CEO)
- Revenue: ▲US$ 178.4 million (Q4 2011)
- Net income: ▲ - US$ 2.9 million (2012)
- Number of employees: 2,000
- Website: www.mundial-sa.com.br

Mundial is a multinational Brazilian manufacturing company. Mundial produces beauty care implements, such as scissors, files and tweezers, and apparel fasteners, such as buttons, rivets and eyelets. Mundial is the result of the merger of Eberle S.A., founded in 1896, and Zivi-Hercules, another Brazilian company, founded in Porto Alegre in 1931.

Eberle began by producing tin oil lamps in Caxias do Sul, an industrial city located in the southernmost state of Brazil. Over time the company expanded into the manufacturing of horse riding gear, tableware, cutlery, motors and fasteners, and by 1974 was producing beauty implements and fashion apparel fasteners. After its 2003 merger with Zivi, the group was renamed Mundial S.A.

Mundial has offices and operations in countries in North America (USA), South America (Brazil, Argentina) and Asia (Hong Kong), and its products reach consumers in about 50 countries. It is a publicly traded company, with shares trading daily at the São Paulo Stock Exchange (BM&F Bovespa).
