= Cosan =

Brazilian conglomerate

Cosan S.A.
- Type: Public
- Traded as: B3: CSAN3; Ibovespa Component
- ISIN: BRCSANACNOR6
- Industry: Energy; Sugar
- Founded: 1936; 90 years ago
- Headquarters: São Paulo, Brazil
- Key people: Luis Henrique Guimarães (CEO)
- Revenue: ▲ R$ 3.972 billion (2019); R$ 2.607 billion (2018)
- Net income: ▲ R$ 2.483 billion (2019); R$ 1.903 billion (2018)
- Number of employees: 45,000
- Subsidiaries: Raízen; Rumo; Comgás; Moove; Cosan Biomassa
- Website: www.cosan.com.br

Cosan S.A. is a public-listed company, a Brazilian conglomerate producer of bioethanol, sugar and energy. The company operates in Brazil, Argentina, Uruguay, Paraguay, Bolivia. They also operate in the United Kingdom under the brand name Moove, manufacturing and supplying Mobil Lubricants, Greases, Cutting Fluids, Coolants and Aerosols.

== History ==
Cosan began in 1936 in Piracicaba, São Paulo, with the founding of its first factory for milling of sugar cane. From the second half of the 1980s, it quickly expanded operations through the acquisition of several factories in the State of São Paulo. Cosan cultivates, collects and processes sugar cane, the main raw material used in the production of sugar and ethanol. Its 23 plantings occupy almost 600,000 hectares of land and employ 45,000 people. In 1989, the group was the largest producer of sugar and alcohol in the world, with 22 companies and the crushing of 10.5 million tons of sugarcane, 5% of the Brazilian total. In the food sector, the company owns 11.5% of shares of Camil Alimentos, that merged with Cosan Alimentos in 2012.

Cosan acquired a 4.9 per cent stake in mining company Vale SA in October 2022, with a subsequent increase to 6.5 per cent. The transaction amounted to approximately R$22 billion ($4.38 billion).

=== Purchases and mergers ===
On April 24, 2008, Cosan announced the purchase of the portfolio of downstream fuel distribution plants from Esso in Brazil.

On March 13, 2009, the Group confirmed the incorporation of NovAmérica Agroenergia through a stock exchange operation between the Cosan and holding Rezende Barbosa, controller of NovAmérica. With the acquisition, the group Cosan reinforces its position as the largest producer of sugar and alcohol in the world and will have an annual processing capacity of around 56 million tonnes of sugar cane, 10% of the Brazilian market, managing 23 plants.

On 3 May 2012, Cosan signed a memorandum of understanding acquiring the BG Group's 60.1% stake in Comgás. The deal was completed in November 2012.

In 2021, Compass Gás e Energia, a company of the Cosan group, announced the purchase of Gaspetro (currently Commit Gás) from Petrobras. The purchase was completed in July 2022 for R$2.097 billion.

In the same year, Compass won the auction for the privatization of the Gas Company of the State of Rio Grande do Sul (Sulgás). The purchase was completed in January 2022 for a minimum amount of R$927.7 million.

=== Joint-Venture with Royal Dutch Shell ===
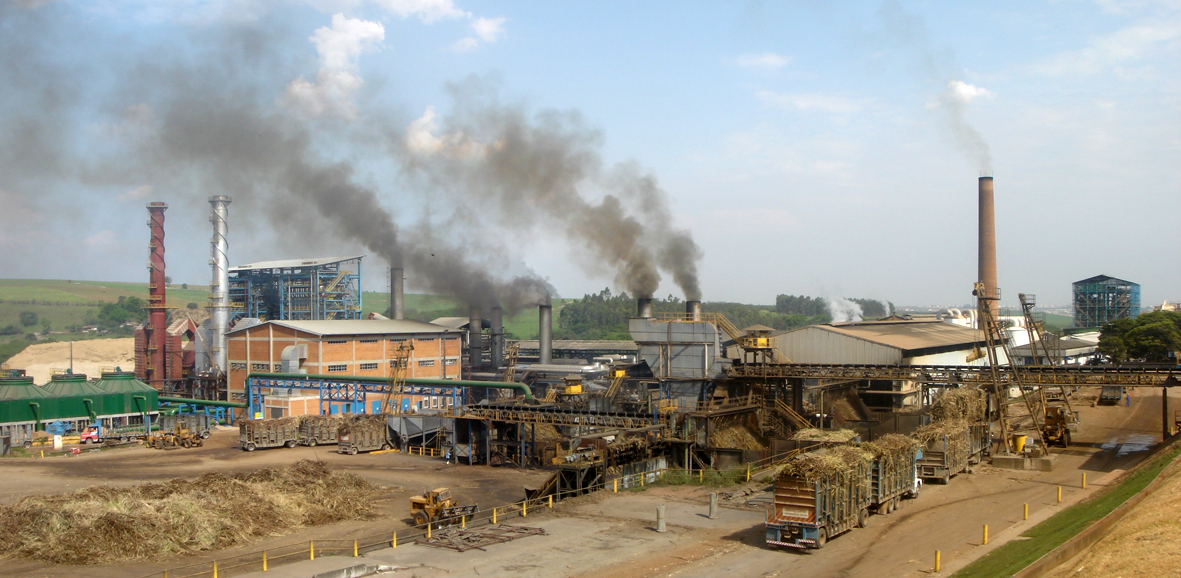
Cosan's Costa Pinto sugar cane mill and ethanol distillery plant at Piracicaba, São Paulo.

On February 1, 2010, Cosan and Royal Dutch Shell announced the creation of a joint venture Raízen that merged their operations of sugar, ethanol and the distribution and marketing of fuels in Brazil. It formed the third-largest distribution company in Brazil and the world's largest bioenergy operation.

In June 2021, Raízen officially registered for an IPO with Brazilian securities regulator CVM. In August, the company raised US$1.3 billion, making it Latin America’s biggest IPO.

Raízen is offering green bonds in 2024. This offering is a first for a Brazilian company. Raízen will offer 10-year or 30-year bonds or both, with a portion of the proceeds used to buy back the bonds (up to $725 million, maturing in 2027).
