= List of companies listed on B3 =

As of January 2017, more than 450 companies were listed on the Brazilian stock exchange B3, according to the exchange's website.

The following is a list of the components of B3's main index Ibovespa as of 19 October 2021, their ticker symbol, industry, and the location of their headquarters.

== Ibovespa ==
| Company | Ticker | Industry | Headquarters |
|---|---|---|---|
| Alpargatas | ALPA4 | clothing | São Paulo |
| Ambev | ABEV3 | beverages | São Paulo |
| Americanas | AMER3 | retail | Rio de Janeiro |
| Azul | AZUL4 | airlines | Barueri |
| B3 | B3SA3 | stock exchange | São Paulo |
| Banco do Brasil | BBAS3 | banking | Brasília |
| BB Seguridade | BBSE3 | insurance | Brasília |
| Bradesco | BBDC3 | banking | Osasco |
| Bradesco | BBDC4 | banking | Osasco |
| Banco Inter | BIDI11 | banking | Belo Horizonte |
| Banco Pan | BPAN4 | banking | São Paulo |
| Bradespar | BRAP4 | holding | São Paulo |
| BRMalls | BRML3 | real estate | Rio de Janeiro |
| Braskem | BRKM5 | petrochemicals | São Paulo |
| BRF | BRFS3 | foods | Itajaí |
| BTG Pactual | BPAC11 | banking | São Paulo |
| Carrefour Brasil | CRFB3 | retail | São Paulo |
| CCR | CCRO3 | transportation | São Paulo |
| CVC Brasil | CVCB3 | travel and tourism | Santo André |
| CEMIG | CMIG4 | electric utility | Belo Horizonte |
| Cielo | CIEL3 | payment system | Barueri |
| Cogna | COGN3 | higher education | Belo Horizonte |
| Copel | CPLE6 | electric utility | Curitiba |
| Cosan | CSAN3 | conglomerate | São Paulo |
| CPFL Energia | CPFE3 | electric utility | Campinas |
| CSN | CSNA3 | siderurgy and metallurgy | Rio de Janeiro |
| Cyrela Brazil Realty | CYRE3 | real estate | São Paulo |
| Dexco | DXCO3 | wood | São Paulo |
| EcoRodovias | ECOR3 | transportation | São Paulo |
| EDP - Energias do Brasil | ENBR3 | electric utility | São Paulo |
| Eletrobras | AXIA3 | electric utility | Rio de Janeiro |
| Eletrobras | AXIA7 | electric utility | Rio de Janeiro |
| Embraer | EMBJ3 | aerospace/defense | São José dos Campos |
| Energisa | ENGI11 | electric utility | Cataguases |
| Eneva | ENEV3 | electric utility | Rio de Janeiro |
| ENGIE Brasil | EGIE3 | electric utility | Florianópolis |
| Equatorial Energia | EQTL3 | electric utility | Brasília |
| Eztec | EZTC3 | real estate | São Paulo |
| Gerdau | GGBR4 | siderurgy and metallurgy | São Paulo |
| Gol | GOLL4 | airlines | São Paulo |
| GPA | PCAR3 | retail | São Paulo |
| Grupo Soma | SOMA3 | clothing | Rio de Janeiro |
| Grupo Fleury | FLRY3 | healthcare | São Paulo |
| Grupo Hapvida | HAPV3 | healthcare | Fortaleza |
| Hypera Pharma | HYPE3 | pharmaceutical | São Paulo |
| Iguatemi | IGTI11 | shopping malls | São Paulo |
| IRB Brasil RE | IRBR3 | insurance | Rio de Janeiro |
| Itaú Unibanco | ITUB4 | banking | São Paulo |
| Itaúsa | ITSA4 | holding | São Paulo |
| JBS | JBSS3 | food and beverages | São Paulo |
| JHSF Participações | JHSF3 | real estate | São Paulo |
| Klabin | KLBN11 | pulp and paper | São Paulo |
| Localiza | RENT3 | rental car | Belo Horizonte |
| LocaWeb | LWSA3 | internet services | São Paulo |
| Lojas Renner | LREN3 | department store | Porto Alegre |
| Magazine Luiza | MGLU3 | department store | São Paulo |
| Marfrig | MRFG3 | foods | São Paulo |
| Méliuz | CASH3 | cashback | Belo Horizonte |
| Metalúrgica Gerdau | GOAU4 | holding | Porto Alegre |
| Minerva Foods | BEEF3 | foods | Barretos |
| MRV | MRVE3 | real estate | Belo Horizonte |
| Multiplan | MULT3 | shopping malls | Rio de Janeiro |
| Natura & Co | NTCO3 | cosmetics | São Paulo |
| Petrobras | PETR3 | oil and gas | Rio de Janeiro |
| Petrobras | PETR4 | oil and gas | Rio de Janeiro |
| Petrobras Distribuidora | VBBR3 | oil and gas | Rio de Janeiro |
| PetroRio | PRIO3 | oil and gas | Rio de Janeiro |
| Petz | PETZ3 | retail | São Paulo |
| Qualicorp | QUAL3 | insurance | São Paulo |
| RaiaDrogasil | RADL3 | drugstore | São Paulo |
| Rede D'Or São Luiz | RDOR3 | healthcare | São Paulo |
| Rumo | RAIL3 | logistics | Curitiba |
| Sabesp | SBSP3 | waste management | São Paulo |
| Santander Brasil | SANB11 | banking | São Paulo |
| Sendas Distribuidora | ASAI3 | retail | Rio de Janeiro |
| SulAmérica Seguros | SULA11 | insurance | Rio de Janeiro |
| Suzano Papel e Celulose | SUZB3 | pulp and paper | Salvador |
| Taesa S.A. | TAEE11 | electric utility | Rio de Janeiro |
| Telefônica Brasil | VIVT3 | telecommunications | São Paulo |
| TIM Brasil | TIMS3 | telecommunications | Rio de Janeiro |
| TOTVS | TOTS3 | software | São Paulo |
| Ultrapar | UGPA3 | conglomerate | São Paulo |
| Unidas | LCAM3 | rental car | São Paulo |
| Usiminas | USIM5 | siderurgy and metallurgy | Belo Horizonte |
| Vale | VALE3 | mining | Rio de Janeiro |
| Via | VIIA3 | retail | São Caetano do Sul |
| YDUQS | YDUQ3 | higher education | Rio de Janeiro |
| WEG | WEGE3 | industrial engineering | Jaraguá do Sul |
