= List of largest Brazilian companies =

This article lists the largest companies of Brazil in terms of their revenue, net profit and total assets, according to the American business magazines Fortune and Forbes.

== 2023 Fortune list ==
This list displays all 9 Brazilian companies in the Fortune Global 500, which ranks the world's largest companies by annual revenue. The figures below are given in millions of US dollars and are for the fiscal year 2022. Also listed are the headquarters location, net profit, number of employees worldwide and industry sector of each company.

Rank	Fortune 500 rank	Name	Industry	Revenue (USD millions)	Profits (USD millions)	Employees	Headquarters
1	71	Petrobras	Oil and Gas	124,474	36,623	45,149	Rio de Janeiro
2	177	JBS S.A.	Food production	72,626	2,995	260,000	São Paulo
3	207	Banco Itaú Unibanco	Banking	63,884	5,755	101,094	São Paulo
4	251	Banco do Brasil	Banking	55,870	5,353	85,953	Brasília
5	273	Banco Bradesco	Banking	51,587	4,066	81,222	Osasco
6	301	Raízen	Energy	47,721	474	44,738	São Paulo
7	332	Vale	Mining	44,287	18,788	64,516	Rio de Janeiro
8	406	Caixa Econômica Federal	Finance	37,066	1,894	86,959	Brasília
9	429	Vibra Energia	Oil and Gas	35,155	298	7,777	Rio de Janeiro

== 2024 Forbes list ==
This list is based on the Forbes Global 2000, which ranks the world's 2,000 largest publicly traded companies. The Forbes list takes into account a multitude of factors, including the revenue, net profit, total assets and market value of each company; each factor is given a weighted rank in terms of importance when considering the overall ranking. The table below also lists the headquarters location and industry sector of each company. The figures are in billions of US dollars and are for the year 2023. All 26 companies from Brazil in the Forbes 2000 are listed.

Rank	Forbes 2000 rank	Name	Headquarters	Revenue (billions US$)	Profit (billions US$)	Assets (billions US$)	Value (billions US$)	Industry
1	54	Petrobras	Rio de Janeiro	99.4	22.3	213.2	92.6	Oil and Gas
2	86	Banco Itaú Unibanco	São Paulo	67.8	6.6	525.2	63.7	Banking
3	160	Banco do Brasil	Brasília	42.0	3.8	368.4	34.5	Banking
4	181	Vale	Rio de Janeiro	41.8	7.8	91.5	55.4	Mining
5	223	Banco Bradesco	Osasco	61.2	2.6	390.8	27.9	Banking
6	302	BTG Pactual	São Paulo	17.0	2.1	113.4	78.8	Financial services
7	652	Nubank	São Paulo	8.1	1.3	43.8	55.6	Financial services
8	831	JBS S.A.	São Paulo	74.2	0.4	40.8	12.7	Food production
9	850	Eletrobras	Rio de Janeiro	7.4	0.9	52.8	18.6	Utilities
10	911	Suzano Papel e Celulose	Salvador	7.7	1.8	28.6	12.9	Pulp and paper
11	951	Raízen	São Paulo	44.4	0.8	25.8	6.0	Energy
12	956	Itaúsa	São Paulo	1.5	2.7	21.7	20.7	Conglomerate
13	1106	WEG Industries	Jaraguá do Sul	6.7	1.2	6.4	32.5	Electrical equipment
14	1133	Vibra Energia	Rio de Janeiro	33.1	1.1	8.8	5.0	Oil and Gas
15	1145	XP Inc.	São Paulo	3.0	0.8	51.3	11.9	Financial services
16	1224	Gerdau Cosiga	São Paulo	13.4	1.3	15.4	8.0	Steel
17	1295	Marfrig	São Paulo	27.2	-0.2	26.2	2.1	Food production
18	1350	Rede D'Oro Luiz	São Paulo	9.7	0.5	18.2	13.7	Healthcare
19	1477	Ultrapar	São Paulo	25.5	0.5	7.4	5.3	Conglomerate
20	1520	CPFL Energia	Campinas	8.1	1.1	15.1	7.7	Utilities
21	1652	CEMIG	Belo Horizonte	7.4	1.2	11.3	5.8	Utilities
22	1658	B3	São Paulo	1.8	0.8	9.8	12.2	Finance
23	1727	Braskem	São Paulo	14.0	-1.2	18.7	3.0	Oil and Gas
24	1827	Cosan	Rio de Janeiro	7.9	0.2	28.8	5.2	Energy
25	1832	Metalurgica Gerdau	Porto Alegre	13.4	0.4	15.4	2.3	Steel
26	1915	Sabesp	São Paulo	5.4	0.7	13.3	10.5	Waste management
27	1984	Equatorial Energia	São Luís	8.2	0.4	20.1	7.0	Utilities

== See also ==
- List of companies of Brazil
- List of largest companies by revenue
