= Anhanguera Educacional =

Brazilian for-profit education company

Anhanguera Educacional Participações S.A.
- Type: Sociedade Anônima
- Industry: Higher education
- Founded: 1994
- Founder: Antônio Carbonari Netto
- Headquarters: Valinhos, Brazil
- Key people: Alexandre Teixeira de Assumpção Saigh (Chairman); Ricardo Leonel Scavazza (CEO)
- Revenue: ▲US$766.8 million (2013)
- Net income: ▼US$53.0 million (2013)
- Number of employees: 21,000
- Website: www.anhanguera.com

Anhanguera Educacional (Portuguese pronunciation: [aɲɐ̃ˈɡwɛɾa] or [aɲɐ̃ˈɡwɛɾa edukasjoˈnaw]) is the second-largest private for-profit educational company in Brazil by number of students, with around 400,000 students in its education network.

The company operates three types of education—67 campuses, more than 450 poles and over 650 vocational education centers—spread across the Federal District. The company offers vocational, undergraduate, postgraduate, continuing education, and others.

The company is the largest of six educational companies listed on BM&F Bovespa, along with its competitors Estácio, Anima Educação, Abril Educação and Ser Educacional. In 2014, the company underwent a corporate merger with Kroton Educacional. The resulting company became the 17th-largest on the Bovespa Index, with a market value of R$24.5 billion and nearly 1 million students.
