= Economy of the state of São Paulo =

Economy of São Paulo
Statistics
- GDP: $689 billion (2023)
- GDP per capita: $15,529 (2023)
- GDP by sector: Agricultural: 2.0% (2009); Industry: 29.0% (2009); Services: 69.0% (2009)

External
- Exports: US$71.5 billion
- Export goods: vehicles and parts (17.2%), planes, helicopters and aero parts (11.6% ), other agro-industrial products (soy, meats, coffee, paper – 10%), sugar and alcohol (7.8%), metalworking (7%), orange juice (5.2%), electronics and telecommunications (4.1%), miscellaneous (31.8%) (2005)
- Imports: $71.8 billion
- Import goods: oil and derivatives (8.4%), computer goods (7.8%), aero parts (4.9%), vehicles and parts (4.3%), metalworking (3%), medications (2.1%), miscellaneous (63.3%) (2005)
- All values, unless otherwise stated, are in US dollars.

The economy of the state of São Paulo is developed and holds the highest GDP among Brazilian states, producing, in 2023, around 3.445 trillion Reais (31.5% of GDP), and the second largest GDP per capita (BRL 77,566.27 in 2013). Being the richest state and population of Brazil, is its main financial center and one of the main centers in the world. The third largest economy and the third largest consumer market in Latin America, occupies the 21st position in the ranking of the largest economies on the planet, ahead of countries such as Argentina, Belgium, Chile and Singapore. Thanks to its enormous economic strength, São Paulo is known as "the locomotive of Brazil".

The São Paulo economy, developed and heterogeneous, is fueled by abundant natural resources, a well-developed infrastructure, high productivity and a highly qualified workforce, with 70% of the qualified workforce in the country. São Paulo is currently a leader in several sectors of the Brazilian economy, notably in the financial sector, concentrated in the city of São Paulo, which contains more than 30.5% of bank branches and 30% of credit operations in Brazil, in addition to BM&FBovespa, one of the five largest stock exchanges in the world. In agriculture, it stands out as one of the largest producers in the country, being the world's largest producer of orange juice, sugar and ethanol, and also ranks among the main industrial food producers in the world, holding about 35.5% of the national industrial food production. In industry, it stands out as the most modern and varied in Latin America, which has a strong technological base, having the largest industrial park and concentrating 36% of Brazilian production; the automobile industry stands out, being the birthplace of the automobile industry in Brazil, the 15th largest vehicle producer in the world, centralizing more than 41% of the factories of the national automotive complex; the aerospace industry and defense, which is the largest aerospace hub in Latin America. Other important sectors that are also in a leadership position in the country are research and development, health and life sciences, real estate market, energy, information and communication technology (ICT), oil and natural gas, green economy, among others.

Located in the Southeast Region, the second smallest in the country by area, the State of São Paulo borders two of the three states of the Region, Minas Gerais and Rio de Janeiro, and with Paraná to the south and Mato Grosso do Sul to the west, in addition to the Atlantic Ocean to the southeast. The federative unit offers an excellent infrastructure logistics for investments, due to the good conditions and extension of its road network, as well as its infrastructure waterway, port and airport. The interconnection of these networks allows an efficient multimodal transport system. According to a survey carried out by the National Transport Confederation (CNT), 19 of the 20 best highways in Brazil are located in the state, thus being the best road network in the country, with 81.6% of its extension classified as excellent or good. In addition, it has the largest and main port in Brazil – one of the main ones in the world – and the largest port complex in Latin America: the Porto de Santos; and the largest and second busiest airport in Latin America, the São Paulo-Guarulhos Airport. In 2018, the state exported around 52.3 billion dollars, which represented 21.8% of Brazilian exports. Among its largest consumer markets are the Latin American Integration Association, to which it exported 30.23%; the North American Free Trade Agreement, 22.47%; Mercosur, 15.96%. With regard to countries, the United States stands out with 17.36% of exported products, followed by China, with 12.46%. With regard to imports, the two countries remain the main partners, but with the reverse order: the latter accounts for 18.72% of the value of imports from São Paulo, while the United States, 17.43%; Germany represents 9.41%.

ICMS collection in São Paulo is the highest in the country. In 2012, it was R$ 109,103,539 thousand or 33.4% of the entire collection of Brazilian states. The state's gross revenue generated approximately $550 billion at purchasing power parity.

Despite continuing to grow economically, the state of São Paulo has been losing part of its share in the national GDP, evidently due to the development of other states. In 1990 the state accounted for 37.3% of Brazil's gross domestic product. In 2008, participation in the total production of goods and services in the country was 33.1%. In 2009, the share was 33.5%, falling again to 33.1% in 2010 and 32.1% in 2013 and rising to 32.2% in 2014.

São Paulo is responsible for 28.6% of the industrial products manufactured in Brazil. The participation in the national industrial GDP has reduced since 2010, when it was responsible for 32.1% of the total. In relation to the state's GDP, industry accounts for 22.9%. In 2016, it was the state with more billionaires, 71 of the 165 in Brazil.

With COVID-19, the country's economy slowed down, while the state showed an increase above the national average, which fell 4.1%.

== History ==
It can be considered that the economic history of São Paulo begins with the coffee cycle that started in the second half of the 19th century (during the period of the First Republic the state also had a relevant expansion industrial). This cycle lasted until the crash of the New York Stock Exchange in 1929. The decline of coffee farming causes the transfer of capital to industry, which was able to develop supported by the consumer market and the labor force available in the state. This first phase of industrialization takes place in the Brazilian economic context of import substitution.

The period of greatest growth of the industry in the state occurred during the mandate of Juscelino Kubitschek, who promoted the internationalization of the Brazilian economy, bringing to São Paulo (mainly the ABC region) the automobile industry.

== Industries ==
Industry is the main feature of São Paulo's economy. After the 1929 crisis, in New York City, coffee gave way to industries, which made São Paulo remain in the lead of the national industry until today. The state exceeds the industrial production of Rio de Janeiro, Minas Gerais and Rio Grande do Sul. Its main industrial centers are:

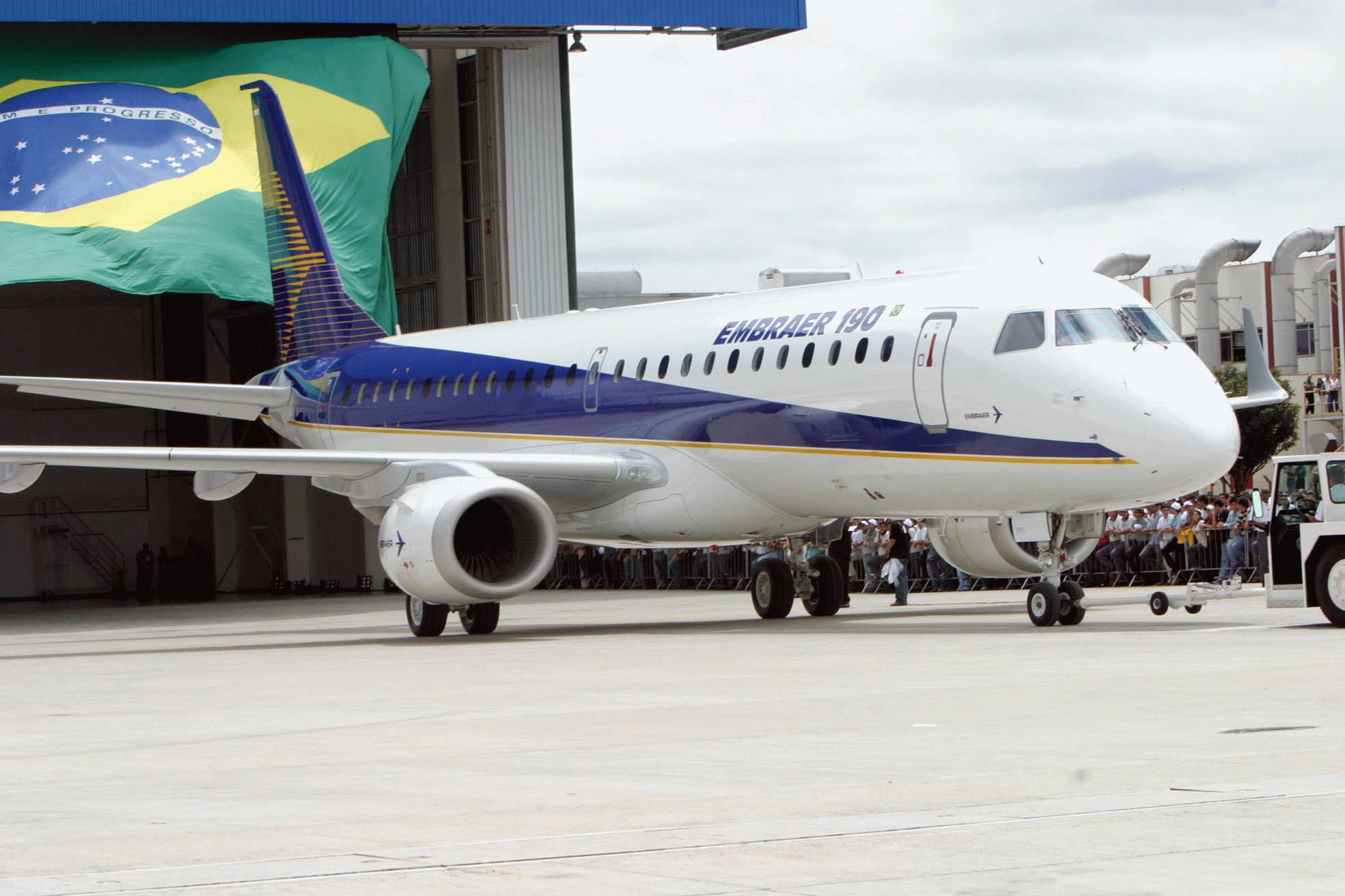
Embraer E-190, jet developed by company Embraer which is headquartered in São José dos Campos.

- Greater São Paulo; largest center of national wealth, the region has an extremely diversified industrial center with high-tech industries and automobile industries, located mainly in the ABC region. Currently, the metropolis is undergoing an economic transformation, leaving its strong industrial character and moving to the service sector.
- Paraíba Valley; it has aerospace industries, such as Embraer, national automobile industries, such as Volkswagen and General Motors and high technology industries. The electronics, textile and chemical industries are also present.
- Metropolitan Region of Campinas; known as "Brazilian Silicon Valley", due to the large concentration of high-tech industries, such as Lucent Technologies, IBM, Compaq and Hewlett-Packard (HP), mainly in the cities of Campinas, Indaiatuba and Hortolândia, the region has a strong and diversified industrial hub, with automobile industries, petrochemical industries such as REPLAN, in Paulínia and textile industries, especially in the cities of Americana, Nova Odessa and Santa Bárbara d'Oeste.
- Mesoregion of Araraquara; where the cities of Araraquara, Matão and São Carlos are located, constitutes an important pole of high technology and agro-industry, with industries from different areas, such as the factory of Suco da Cutrale, Meias Lupo, Metallurgica IESA, Randon, Embraer, Baldan, Marchesan, Citrosuco, Volkswagen Motors, Faber-Castell, Electrolux, Tecumseh and Husqvarna.
- Mesoregion of Piracicaba; located next to the Metropolitan Region of Campinas, there are important municipalities such as Piracicaba, popularly known as "Florença Paulista", Limeira and Rio Claro. This region is internationally known for the presence of companies that produce biotechnology, in addition to the production of biofuels. Piracicaba stands out for its cultivation and innovation in the production of sugar cane, being the region that launches all trends in the sector, as well as being one of the administrative headquarters of the largest producer of sugar and alcohol in the Brazil, and one of the largest in the world, Raízen, from the Cosan Group.
- Mesoregion of Ribeirão Preto; located in the north and northeast of the state, where the relevant cities of Ribeirão Preto, Franca, Sertãozinho, Barretos, Bebedouro, Jaboticabal, among others, is an important hub with industries from different areas, such as the factory of Coca-Cola, Nestlé, 3M, Ambev, Cargill, International Paper and Netafim. Other sectors stand out in the region, such as the production of foods and drinks; health industries; paper, cardboard and graphics; metallurgy, textile, clothing and shoes. The main source of income in the primary sector, sugar cane, is the source of raw material for the manufacture of alcohol and sugar, and it is one of the largest production centers for these products in the state of São Paulo.
- Automotive industry of São Paolo;the Brazilian car industry began in São Paulo, and currently represents 43% of industrial factories dedicated to the assembly of auto vehicles, road machinery, engines and components in the country, housing companies such as Caoa Chery, Caterpillar, CNH Industrial, Ford, General Motors (Chevrolet), Honda, Hyundai, John Deere, Komatsu, Mercedes-Benz, Scania, Toyota, Valtra, Volkswagen and Volvo. The São Paulo automotive industry has more than 50% of the personnel employed in the manufacture and assembly of motor vehicles, trailers, and bodies in the country, and also accounts for about 45% of all motor vehicles produced in the country, in addition to having most of the companies of auto parts in Brazil.

== Agriculture ==
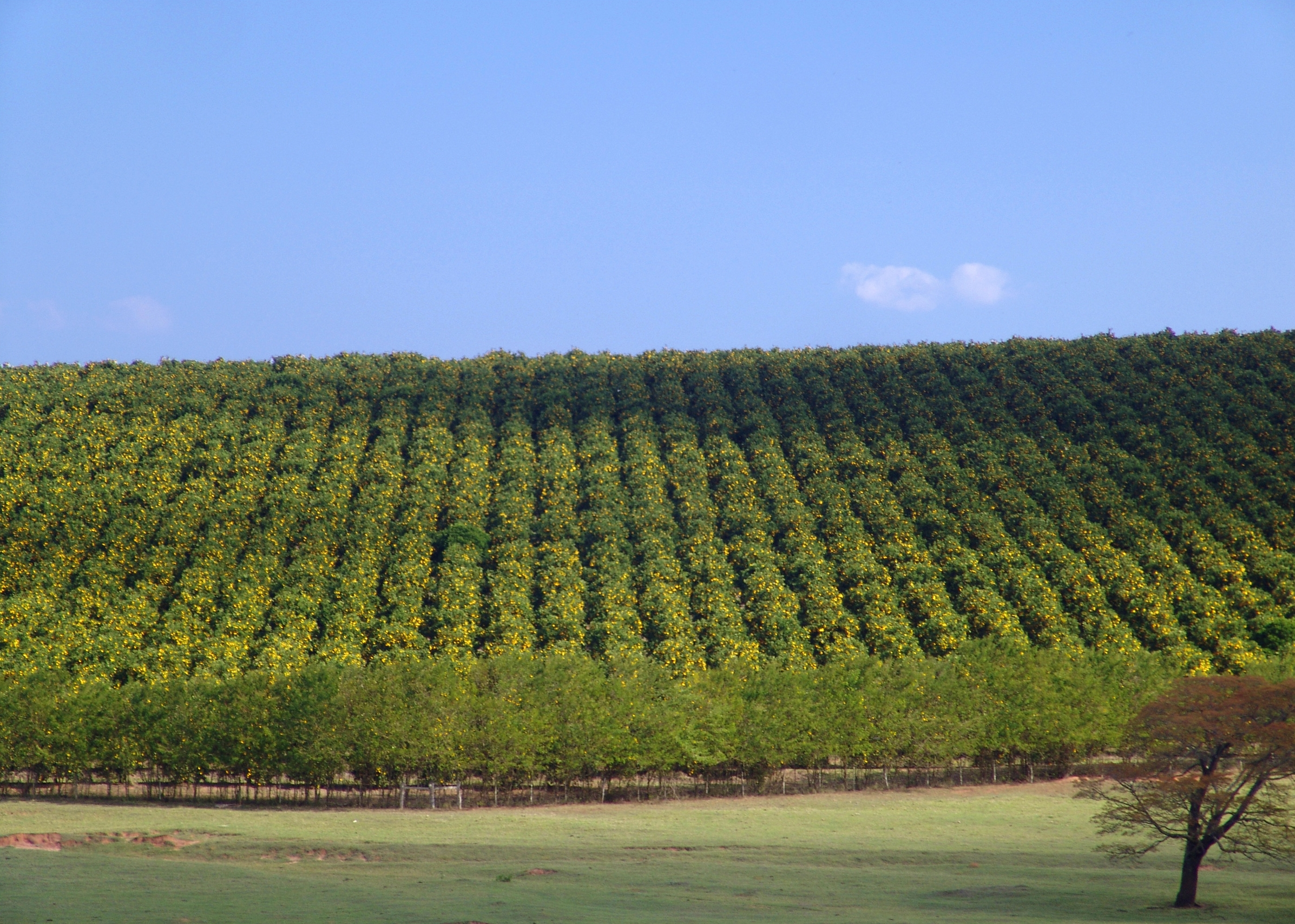
Orange grove in the city of Avaré

The main characteristics of farming in São Paulo are variety and quality. In 2017, the income generated by the sector in São Paulo corresponded to 10.14% of the national agricultural activity, according to the Brazilian Institute of Geography and Statistics (IBGE) and the State Data Analysis System Foundation (Seade) – (2017)

The two main agricultural highlights in the state are sugar cane and orange. In 2019, São Paulo produced 425,617,093 tons of sugarcane. São Paolo's production is equivalent to 56.5% of Brazilian production of 752,895,389 tons, surpasses the production of India (2nd largest sugarcane producer in the world) in 2019 (which was 405,416,180 tons) and was equivalent to 21.85% of world production of cane in the same year (1,949,310,108 tons). As a result, it becomes a major producer and exporter of ethanol and sugar. In 2019, São Paulo produced 13,256,246 tons of oranges. São Paulo's production is equivalent to 78% of Brazilian production of 17,073,593 tons, surpasses the production of China (2nd largest orange producer in the world) in 2019 (which was 10,435,719 tons) and was equivalent to 16.84% of world production of orange in the same year (78,699,604 tons). It is largely exported as juice. It also stands out for producing 90% of the country's peanuts, which are partly exported; 85% of lemon; in addition to being the largest Brazilian banana producer, tangerine and persimmon, the 2nd largest producer of potatoes, carrots and strawberries; the 3rd largest for coffee and cassava; and has considerable soybean production and corn.

Livestock activity has a significant participation in São Paulo. Agribusiness production related to the segment added up to R$48 billion in 2017. The cattle breeding areas in São Paulo produced R$7.8 billion in cattle, that is, 10.33% of what is produced in Brazil. The egg sector, for example, participated with 23.35% of Brazilian production, in monetary terms this meant a production of BRL 3.4 billion.

According to IEA data, the production value of chicken meat in the State of São Paulo in 2018 was R$3.7 billion, occupying fifth place in the ranking in the State Agricultural Production Value, behind sugarcane values, beef, orange for industry and soy, with a decrease of 4.6% compared to 2017. The production of chicken meat in 2018 was 1.34 million tons, a loss of 11.1% over 2017.

Pig farming in São Paulo faces problems, such as lack of scale in production, high production costs, competition with other more profitable agricultural activities and lack of cooperative aptitude, to name just a few. Added to these problems is competition for consumers who, when they have budgetary restrictions on purchasing food, choose chicken meat based on the price and, when they don't have it, choose beef based on preference. What results from these factors is the growing disincentive for pig farmers to remain in the activity in which production is insufficient and practically all consumed in the state itself.

== Energy ==
The state of São Paulo, being the most industrialized state in the federation, is the largest producer and consumer of national energy. São Paulo has more hydroelectric power plants than any other state, also having a thermoelectric plant, also known to be the largest in Latin America.

== Finance ==
The São Paulo Stock, Commodity and Futures Exchange, in September 2010, became the second largest stock exchange in the world, at market value.

== See also ==
- São Paulo
- Economy of the city of São Paulo
