= Maria de Lourdes Egydio Villela =

Brazilian business owner and philanthropist

- Occupations: Philanthropist, businesswoman

Maria de Lourdes Egydio Villela, also known as Milu, is a Brazilian businesswoman, heiress, and philanthropist. Her grandfather founded Banco Itaú, which later merged with Unibanco to form Itaú Unibanco, Latin America's largest non-governmental bank. Her father founded Duratex. She sits on the board of directors of Itaúsa and the São Paulo Museum of Modern Art. She graduated from the Pontifical Catholic University of São Paulo.

In November 2004 she was appointed a UNESCO Goodwill Ambassador in the field of inclusive education.
