= Rede S.A. =

Rede S.A
- Type: Private
- Industry: Financial services
- Founded: 1996
- Headquarters: Barueri, Brazil
- Key people: Marcos Magalhães, (CEO)
- Products: Payment systems
- Revenue: ▲US$ 1.5 billion (2012)
- Net income: ▲US$ 790.1 million (2012)
- Number of employees: 2,455
- Parent: Itaú Unibanco
- Website: www.userede.com.br

Rede known as Redecard is a Brazilian multi-brand acquirer with 25 brands in its portfolio, for credit, debit and benefit cards. Its activities include merchant acquiring, capturing, transmission, processing and settlement of credit and debit card transactions, prepayment of receivables to merchants (resulting from sales made by means of credit cards), rental of POS terminals, check verification through POS terminals, credit card machine and the capture and transmission of transactions using benefit-voucher, private-label cards and loyalty programs such as Multiplus. The company is the first largest in its sector. The company was traded in BM&F Bovespa and disclosed in September 24, 2012.

== History ==
Rede history dates back to 1970, when Citibank, who is among the largest financial institutions and credit card issuers worldwide, along with Banco Itaú and Unibanco (currently Itau Unibanco), who are among the largest financial institutions and credit card issuers in Brazil, gathered to found Credicard. Credicard's activities included those of a credit card brand, an issuer and a merchant acquirer and payment processor.

By 1980, Credicard had issued 500,000 cards and affiliated 120,000 merchants. In 1987, Credicard began issuing Mastercard branded cards and, by 1994, it had issued 5 million cards. During that same year, Credicard launched the first debit card in the Brazilian market, Redeshop, which allowed merchants to receive payment for their sales on the first business day after the transaction, following the charge to the cardholder's account by the issuer.

In 1996, Citibank, Itaucard and Unibanco believed it was necessary to have a company specialized in merchant acquiring and payment processing and founded Rede as Redecard by spinning off Credicard's merchant acquiring and payment processing activities. In that same year, Mastercard International also became a shareholder of Rede. Since then, Rede has been the main merchant acquirer and payment processor for Mastercard and Diners Club International branded credit and debit cards in Brazil.

Since its formation, Rede was the leader of the Redecard Consortium. The corporate purposes of the Redecard Consortium, which was incorporated according to Brazilian Corporate Law, were the same as the ones Redecard currently pursues: affiliating merchants to accept credit and debit cards, and capturing, transmitting, processing and settling transactions carried out with Mastercard and Diners Club International credit and debit cards in Brazil. The members of the Rede Consortium included the controlling shareholders and Redecard itself. The assets held by Redecard Consortium were fully transferred to Rede.

As the leader of the Redecard Consortium, Rede performed and carried out all the activities necessary for the development of the Redecard Consortium. The results of Redecard Consortium were distributed according to the share of each consortium member in its revenues and certain revenues and expenses were shared by the consortium members in the same proportion as their respective shareholdings in Redecard, in accordance with criteria defined in the consortium formation contract.

The Rede Consortium ceased to exist on March 31, 2007, and after its termination, Redecard assumed all Redecard Consortium's rights and obligations.

In June 2007, Rede was listed on the São Paulo Stock Exchange – BM&F Bovespa, with its shares being listed on the New Market ("Novo Mercado"), a segment that is reserved for companies that are committed to differentiated practices in terms of the relationship with minority shareholders and the highest level of corporate governance that is found in the Brazilian capital markets. Upon the listing, Mastercard sold its stake in the Company. In January 2008 Citibank sold part of its stake and exited the Company entirely in March 2009. Consequently, the Company underwent a shareholding restructuring. As a result of this, the Itaú Unibanco Group, which had recently been created by the merger between these two banks, became Rede's controlling shareholder. Following a public tender offer by Itaú, the company was delisted in 2012 and changed its name to Rede in 2013.

== Brands ==
Credit and debit cards	Voucher cards
Mastercard	Ticket
Visa	Sodexo VR
Diners	Green Card
Discover	Planvale
Aura	Nutricash
Hipercard	Verocheque
Sorocred	Cabal Vale
Cabal Débito	Sapore Benefícios
Sicredi	BNB Clube
Coopercred	Valecard
China UnionPay (CUP)	Sorocred
Avista	Coopercred
American Express	Alelo
Elo	
Calcard	
Cred-System	
Banescard	

== Products and services ==
The activities of capturing, transmitting, processing and settling transactions for merchants performed through Mastercard and Diners Club International credit cards is the main product of the Company. Revenues from these activities represented 47.7% of Redecard's operating net revenue for the year ended December 31, 2008, whereas for the third quarter of 2009 they corresponded to 47.9% of this revenue.

In the Brazilian market, credit cards may be used in two ways:

- Immediate payment, when the cardholder has an average of 30 days after the transaction to pay the respective bill, and
- Payment in installments, when the cardholder makes the payment of the purchase price in installments, pursuant to one of the following: (i) interest-bearing financing, which is granted by the card issuer, and whereby the merchant is paid the sale amount in one lump sum, and (ii) interest-free financing, which is granted by the merchant who receives the sale payment in the same number of installments assumed by the cardholder.

In either case, whether immediate payment or in installments, the merchant receives the amount of the transaction directly from Redecard within the contractually agreed period, unless the merchant requests prepayment of its receivables.

The financial settlement to the merchant is guaranteed by Redecard, which in turn receives a guarantee from the Brands Mastercard and Diners Club International that the card issuer will make the payment of the transaction as authorized. All credit card transactions are authorized by the card issuers.

Redecard captures, transmits, processes and settles transactions for merchants performed through Mastercard Maestro and Redeshop branded debit cards. Redeshop brand was acquired by Mastercard International in 2004 and it is in the process of being replaced by Mastercard Maestro.

Revenues from the capture, transmission, processing and settlement of debit card transactions represented 12.8% of Redecard's operating net revenue for the year ended December 31, 2008. If we consider only the third quarter of 2009, the revenues from debit card transactions corresponded to 12.7% of Redecard's operating net revenue.

Currently, the Interchange Fee paid to debit card issuers corresponds to 50% of the merchant discount rate.

In the Brazilian market, debit cards are increasingly replacing checks as a mean of payment because they represent greater security to merchants, as there is need to use a password and electronically confirm personal data. Settlement takes place on the business day following transaction capture by Redecard, which in turn is fully captured and approved by the issuer electronically.
Private Label Cards
Rede also captures and transmits transactional data from the use of private label cards issued by retail stores. By the end of 2007, more than 50 million of these operations were processed by Redecard among its affiliate merchant outlets.
RAV - Pre-payment of Receivables
Rede offers affiliated merchants the possibility of pre-payment of credit card financial transaction settlements. The Company negotiates a commercial discount percentage with the merchant which is immediately deducted from the anticipated payment of receivables, normally made one working day subsequent to a merchant pre-payment request.
POS Rental
POS electronic terminals used for the capture of electronic transactions are owned by Redecard and are offered on a rental basis to affiliated merchants. By the end of 2007, the electronic terminal base totaled 782.3 thousand units, a growth of 21.2% in relation to the number of units in 2006. In some segments, desktop electronics terminals have been replaced with newer wireless terminals that reached a volume of 51.6 thousand units; a growth rate of 54.2% over the previous year.

POS electronic terminals may also provide other important services to affiliated merchants. A good example is the Bank Check Verification Service that allows a vendor to make a quick online inquiry to the Brazilian bank check control entity called SERASA, to confirm information presented on the check as well as confirm whether the check has been stolen, lost, canceled or subject to a stop payment order, from anywhere in the country.
FoneShop
The FoneShop platform allows affiliated merchants to make sales and payment transactions via cell phones through a POS electronic terminal, requiring the use of a simple updated application. In these cases, the cell phone becomes the payment vehicle. The phone holder has the option of choosing the card he wishes to pay with, even if he does not have the card with him at the time of purchase.

For the commercial segments that do not operate from a fixed location where a transaction may take place (delivery services, home-based sales, taxi drivers, street market vendors, etc.), this solution has been created to transform a vendor-owned cell phone into an electronic terminal for capturing sales transactions with the installation of a simple application supplied by Rede. Now, all affiliated merchants can conduct transactions on POS electronic terminals or on their cell phones.
Benefit Cards
Redecard is working with the major Benefit Card companies in Brazil, operating under brands such as Ticket, Sodexho and VR. For restaurants, accepting benefit cards will help attract new clients and increase sales. For these services, Redecard revenues depend only on the number of captured transactions.
E.rede
Five years ago, Rede developed an online capture technology called E.rede, for transactions made with Mastercard and Diners Club International credit cards for purchases made through websites and virtual stores owned and operated by affiliated merchants. E.rede offers two major security differentials: the first allows for verification of the complete address and the taxpayer ID number of the purchaser. The second advantage is the issuance of a sale pre-authorization approval that gives the merchant five days for the analysis of the sale and credit/debit operation before actual delivery of the product.
Prepaid mobile phone recharging
This service is available on POS electronic terminals installed at small and mid-sized commercial outlets for cardholders to purchase credits for their prepaid cell phones using Mastercard Maestro and RedeShop debit cards. Telecom company operators remunerate Redecard and the local merchant with a percentage of the value of the credit purchase. This service optimizes the use of electronic terminals, creating another convenience for debit cardholders while providing merchants with an additional source of income.
Purchase & Cash
A service that allows MasterCard Maestro and Redeshop debit cardholders to withdraw cash (limited to R$100.00) when they purchase at affiliated merchants. This service is offered at no cost-no revenue for any of the participants. The objectives of this product include encouraging the use of debit cards for making purchases and offering cardholders more security in comparison to making cash withdrawals at ATMs normally located in the streets of major urban centers.
