= Cielo S.A. =

Brazilian credit card operator

- Company type: Sociedade Anônima
- Traded as: B3: CIEL3; Ibovespa Component
- Industry: Financial services
- Founded: 1997
- Headquarters: Barueri, São Paulo, Brazil
- Key people: Estanislau Bassols (CEO)
- Products: Payment systems
- Revenue: ▲US$ 3.0 billion (2018)
- Net income: ▼US$ 923.0 million (2018)
- Number of employees: 1,174
- Website: www.cielo.com.br

Cielo is the largest Brazilian credit and debit card operator. It operates as a multi-brand acquirer, offering solutions for managing and processing transactions via credit, debit and Pix. Cielo is the biggest payment system company in Latin America by revenue and market value.

== History ==
The company was originally established as Companhia Brasileira de Meios de Pagamento in 1995 as a joint-venture between Visa International, Bradesco, Banco do Brasil, Banco Santander Brasil), and the now defunct Banco Nacional. Its purpose was to create a common infrastructure to be used by all banks issuing Visa cards, instead of each bank having a separate technological solution to process credit card transactions.

On July 1, 2010, VisaNet was renamed Cielo. Following updated regulation by the Brazilian government, it was no longer the only processor of Visa cards in Brasil and began processing Mastercard, Diners Club and other cards.

== IPO ==
VisaNet debuted on the São Paulo Stock Exchange on June 29, 2010 listed in Novo Mercado. It was the third largest IPO in the history of Bovespa, only behind Banco Santander Brasil and BB Seguridade. The company raised the equivalent of R$ 8.397 billion or US$ 4.428 billion through the sale of 559.8 million ordinary shares, 41% of the shares of the company.
