= Novo Mercado =

Novo Mercado (New Market) is a listing segment of B3 for the trading of shares issued by companies that commit themselves voluntarily to adopt corporate governance practices in addition to those that are required by law.

The value and liquidity of the shares are positively influenced by the degree of security offered by the rights granted to shareholders and the quality of information provided by the companies. This is the basic premise of the Novo Mercado.

The entry of a company in New Market place by signing a contract and requires adherence to a set of corporate rules, generally referred to as "good corporate governance practices, more stringent than those present in the Brazilian legislation. These rules, consolidated in the Listing Rules of the Novo Mercado, expand shareholder rights, improve the quality of information usually provided by companies and widespread ownership, and to determine the resolution of corporate conflicts by a Board of Arbitration offer investors the security of an alternative more responsive and specialized.

The main innovation of the Novo Mercado, in relation to legislation is the requirement that the capital of the company is composed only of common shares. However, this is not the only one. For example, the company opened a participant in the New Market has the additional obligations:

- Extension to all shareholders the same conditions obtained by the controllers when the sale of the company's control (tag along).
- Implementation of a public offer to acquire all outstanding shares, at least by the economic value, the chances of closing the capital or cancellation of registration of trading on the Novo Mercado.
- Board of Directors with a minimum of 5 (five) members and unified term of up to 2 (two) years, reelection being permitted. At least 20% (twenty percent) of the members should be independent directors.
- Improving the information provided, adding to the Quarterly Information (ITR) - a document that is sent by companies listed on the CVM and the BOVESPA, available to the public and contains quarterly financial statements - among others: financial statements and statement of cash flows.
- Uma S/A aberta, quando assina com a Bolsa de São Paulo um contrato de corporativa denominado Novo Mercado a empresa terá queemitir 25% de ações ordinárias junto ao público, ter seus dados financeiros de acordo com as normas internacionais de contabilidade (IFRS), e se a empresa venha a vender o seu controle acionário, os acionistas possuidores de ações ordinárias receberão 100% desse valor.
- Among other demand

Also present in the Listing Rules, some of these commitments must be approved in General Meeting and included in the Company's Bylaws.

== See also ==
- Índice Bovespa (Bovespa Index)
- List of companies traded at Bovespa
