= Antônio Carbonari Netto =

Brazilian mathematician and businessman

- Occupations: Founder and CEO of Anhanguera Educacional
- Organization: Anhanguera Educacional
- Known for: Educator, Mathematician, Businessman
- Title: Dean of Centro Universitário Anhangüera of Leme, Director General of several colleges

Antônio Carbonari Netto is a Brazilian educator, mathematician, and businessman.

He is founder, CEO and one of the main shareholders of Anhanguera Educacional, a holding of 18 institutions of higher education in the state of São Paulo, one of the largest private universities in the country.

In addition to his position and CEO of Anhangüera Educacional, he is dean of the Centro Universitário Anhangüera of Leme (Anhangüera University Center), and director general of the following colleges: Faculdades de Valinhos, Faculdade Comunitária de Campinas, Faculdade Politécnica de Jundiaí and Faculdade Politécnica de Matão.

Carbonari Netto is a prominent academic and business leader in the private education world in Brazil. He has served in the executive board and councils of several important associations, such as the Associação Brasileira de Mantenedoras do Ensino Superior (Brazilian Association of Higher Education Organizations), Sindicato dos Estabelecimentos do Ensino Superior de São Paulo (Syndicate of the Higher Education Institutions of São Paulo), and others.
