= RD S.A. =

Brazilian pharmacy chain

Raia Drogasil S.A.
- Type: Sociedade Anônima
- Traded as: B3: RADL3; Ibovespa Component
- Industry: Drugstore
- Founded: 2011
- Headquarters: São Paulo, Brazil
- Key people: Antonio Carlos Pipponzi, (Chairman); Marcilio D'Amico Pousada, (CEO)
- Products: Drugs, Cosmetics
- Revenue: ▲BRL$ 34.0 billion (2023)
- Net income: ▲BRL$ 1,087.1 million (2023)
- Number of employees: 57,708 (1Q24)
- Website: www.rdsaude.com.br

RD Saúde (or Raia Drogasil) is the largest drugstore company in Latin America by revenue and market capitalization. With its headquarters in São Paulo, it has more than 3,000 pharmacies in Brazil with a national presence in all 27 states.

The company's pharmacies are branded as Raia and Drogasil and are supplied by 14 distribution centers. The company also leads in online audience through its proprietary Raia and Drogasil mobile apps and websites, which accounted for 15.2% of 2023 retail gross revenues according to publicly filed financial statements. The company has 3.614 stores around Brazil.

RD Saúde's top 3 competitors include Grupo DPSP, Pague Menos and Farmácias São João.

== History ==
The company was founded as Raia Drogasil in 2011 from the merger of drugstore companies Droga Raia (founded in 1905) and Drogasil (founded in 1935), both listed in the São Paulo Stock Exchange.

In 2015 the company was included into the Ibovespa, the main Brazilian stock Index.

In 2017 the company changed its corporate brand from Raia Drogasil to simply RD. It later adjusted the brand to RD Saúde in 2024 as the company shifted its strategy from being simply a pharmaceutical retailer into an integral health provider.

This strategy seeks to leverage the reach and proximity of its more than 3 thousand locations to its more than 47.5 million active customers as well as its 15.5% market share to promote a healthier society through 4 pillars: Health promotion (to promote, educate and maintain a healthy lifestyle), Prevention (to monitor and treat chronic conditions), Protection (to protect health through vaccination and immunization) and Primary Care (to diagnose and treat acute, low-complexity conditions).
