= Itau Securities =

Itaú Securities
- Company type: Subsidiary
- Industry: Financial services
- Founded: 2002; 24 years ago
- Headquarters: New York, United States
- Products: Stock broking
- Parent: Itaú Unibanco

Itaú Securities is an American securities firm based in New York City, United States that is a subsidiary of Brazilian bank Itaú Unibanco. It is a broker dealer (est: 2002) that specialize in Brazilian securities for US institutional investors. As of 2008, the companies market capitalization was US$ 41.7 billion.

Itaú’s shares are traded on the New York Stock Exchange. The company is regulated by the National Association of Securities Dealers (NASD)and has a net capital of US$ 30million.

Itaú Corretora and Itaú BBA, the investment banking arm of the group, participated actively in Brazilian IPO’s and block-trade operations, such as Natura, GOL, PIBB, ALL, WEG, Braskem, EdB, Tractebel, Vivax, Gafisa, Totvs, Dasa, Duratex, Eletropaulo, Profarma, Terna and Perdigao consolidating its position as one of the leading distributors in the Brazilian capital markets. Banco Itaú Holding Financeira (ADR: ITU) is a multiple bank under the supervision of the Central Bank of Brazil and one of the largest financial institutions in Brazil.

== See also ==
- Development finance institution
- List of companies of Brazil
- List of largest Brazilian companies
