= Cogna Educação =

Brazilian private educational company

Cogna Educação S.A.
- Type: Sociedade Anônima
- Traded as: B3: COGN3; Ibovespa Component
- Industry: Higher education
- Founded: 1966
- Headquarters: São Paulo, Brazil
- Key people: Evando José Neiva, (Chairman); Rodrigo Galindo, (CEO)
- Revenue: ▲US$ 2.1 billion (2017)
- Net income: ▲US$ 703.9 million (2017)
- Number of employees: 36,000
- Parent: Pearson plc (pending sale)
- Website: www.cogna.com.br

Cogna Educação (formerly Kroton Educacional), founded in 1966 in Belo Horizonte, is the largest private educational company in Brazil. It has operated for over 45 years in all educational segments, such as preschool, elementary, secondary, adult high school, college preparatory school, free courses, and other related educational activities, as well as higher, professional, and post-graduation education.

== Descriptions ==
Cogna has more than 2 million students, with 290,000 students in basic education in 213 campuses and 726 centers divided into 22 educational brands located in all Brazilian states.

The company is also involved in the distribution, wholesale, retail, import, and export of textbooks, course books, magazines, and other publications. In addition, it engages in the licensing of school-related and paedagogical products. The company operates 21 own campuses under the Pitagoras brand; ten under the Unic brand; five under the Unopar brand; and ten under the Unime, Ceama, Unirondon, Fais, Fama and União brands in ten Brazilian states. It also operates 804 associated schools in Brazil under the Pitagoras brand, as well as five partner schools in Japan and a partner school in Canada.

It is the largest Brazilian company in the higher education segment by number of students and revenue. In July 2014, the company merged with its largest competitor Anhanguera Educacional becoming the largest higher education company in the world by market capitalisation.

In 2019 the company changed its name from Kroton to Cogna and moved its headquarters from Belo Horizonte to São Paulo. The company's largest competitor is the Rio de Janeiro-based YDUQS.

In 2025, That is announced that the company will be acquired by the British company Pearson plc.

In 2026, the Administrative Council for Economic Defense (CADE) approves Pearson's acquisition of Cogna Educação, which is set to be completed by the second half of 2028.
