= General Shopping e Outlets =

Shopping mall management company in Brazil

General Shopping Brasil S.A.
- Company type: Sociedade Anônima
- Traded as: B3: GSHP3
- Industry: Shopping Malls
- Founded: 1989
- Headquarters: São Paulo, Brazil
- Key people: Victor Poli Veronezi, (Chairman); Alessandro Poli Veronezi, (CEO)
- Products: Planning, development and management Shopping Malls
- Revenue: ▼US$ 76.0 million (2012)
- Net income: ▲US$ 75.8 million (2017)
- Number of employees: 324
- Website: Official website

General Shopping is a Brazilian shopping mall management company. Headquartered in São Paulo and founded in 1989, the company is controlled by the Veronezi Family, which has a 59.41% stake in the company. It has 9 shopping malls and 6 outlets, totaling 293.2 thousand m^{2} of Gross Leasable Area (GLA).

== History ==
In 1989, the company was founded by Antônio Veronezi after the opening of Poli Shopping in Guarulhos. Before becoming a shopping mall, it was a tool and appliance store.

In December 2017, General Shopping agreed to sell 70% of the Guarulhos International Shopping Mall for R$ 937 million to Gazit Brasil, which belongs to the Gazit-Globe group. In February 2019, General Shopping sold the remaining 10% for R$ 154 million, and Gazit became the 80% owner of the Guarulhos shopping mall.
