= Localiza =

Brazilian car rental company

Localiza Rent a Car S.A.
- Company type: Sociedade Anônima
- Traded as: B3: RENT3; Ibovespa Component
- Industry: Car rental
- Founded: 1973; 53 years ago
- Headquarters: Belo Horizonte, Brazil
- Key people: Bruno Lasansky (CEO)
- Revenue: ▲US$ 2.0 billion (2018)
- Net income: ▲US$ 170.0 million (2018)
- Number of employees: 12,300
- Website: www.localiza.com

Localiza is a Brazilian car rental company founded in 1973 in Belo Horizonte and is the biggest car rental in Latin America and one of the largest in the world by size of the fleet and market capitalization.

Localiza has a network consisting of 584 car rental branches in Brazil and in other eight countries, 286 of which are owned directly and 158 of which are franchised in Brazil, in 406 cities around the country. being 70 branches are franchised abroad in 44 cities in Argentina, Chile, Colombia, Ecuador, Paraguay, Uruguay, and Mexico.

In addition to the rental car company also operates in the business of leasing and fleet management, and grant franchises for the sale of used cars from its fleet to renew the order process (these businesses are complementary and mutually reinforcing).

Currently, the company has more than 270.000 cars from brands like Volkswagen, Fiat, Renault and Chevrolet, and other nine automotive companies. Localiza competes with Movida, Locamerica-Unidas, Turoll and other car rental companies.
