= Taesa S.A. =

Transmissora Aliança de Energia Elétrica S.A.
- Type: Sociedade Anônima
- Traded as: B3: TAEE3, TAEE4, TAEE11; Ibovespa Component
- Industry: Electricity
- Founded: 2000
- Headquarters: Rio de Janeiro, Brazil,
- Key people: Raul Lycurgo Leite, (CEO); Luiz Felipe Veloso, (Chairman)
- Products: Electric power
- Services: Electric power transmission
- Revenue: ▼US$ 325.0 million (2017)
- Net income: ▼US$ 196. 0 million (2017)
- Number of employees: 26,370
- Parent: CEMIG
- Website: www.taesa.com.br

Taesa is one of the largest Brazilian electric power transmission company. It is majority owned by Belo Horizonte based CEMIG, having the Bogotá based Interconexion Eléctrica as the second largest shareholder.

The company operates approximately 10,000 kilometers of transmission lines in 18 Brazilian states.

Currently, Taesa has 34 transmission concessions, segregated into 10 concessions that make up the holding company; 5 full investees and 19 participations. The Paraguaçu, Aimorés and Lot 1 concessions are joint ventures with CTEEP - which holds 50% of the capital of each of them.

In addition, it has assets in 67 substations with a voltage level between 230 and 525kV, present in all regions of the country and an Operation and Control Center located in Brasília.

== See also ==
- CEMIG
- Electricity sector in Brazil
