= Brazilian National Energy Efficiency Olympiad =

Annual academic competition

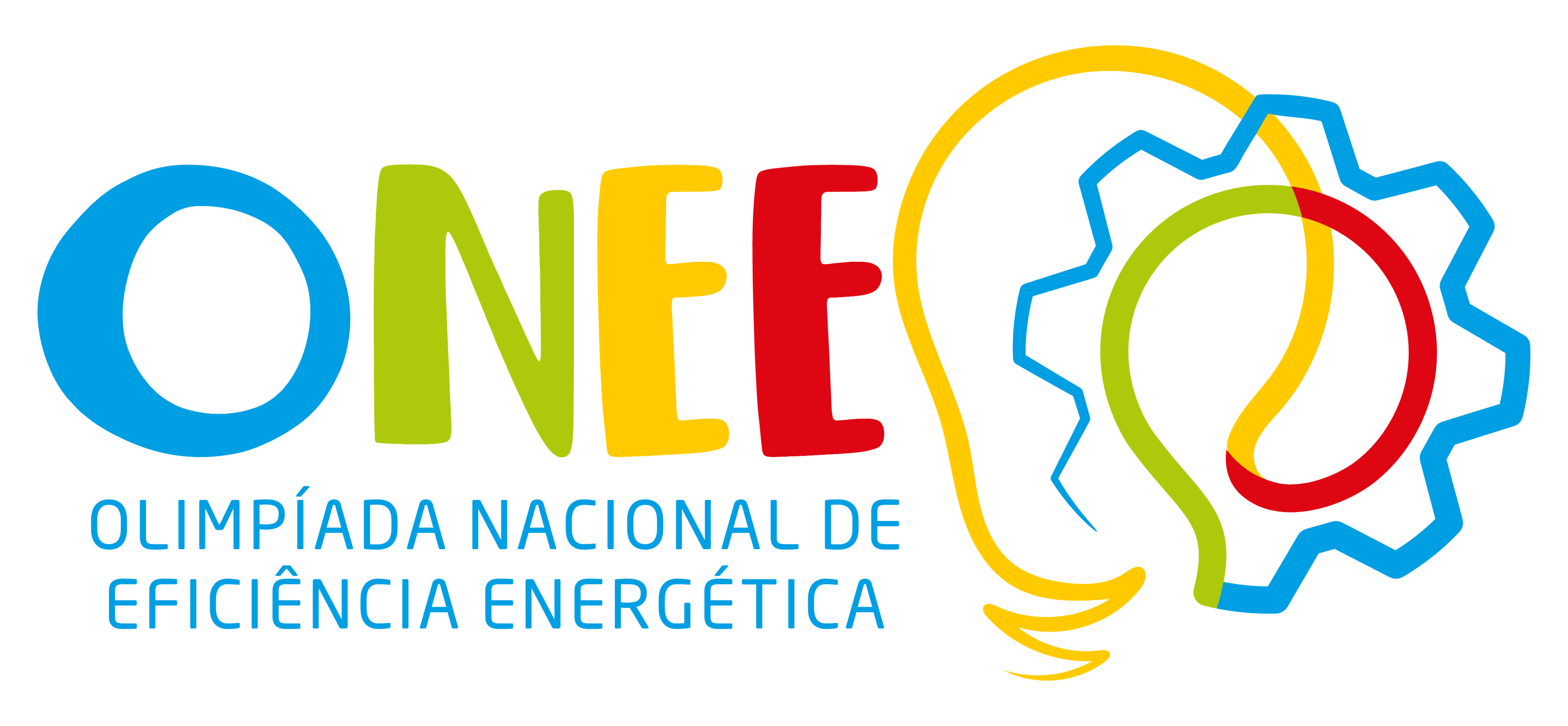
ONEE logo

The Brazilian National Energy Efficiency Olympiad (Portuguese: Olimpíada Nacional de Eficiência Energética, or ONEE) is an annual academic competition aimed at promoting knowledge and awareness about energy efficiency among Brazilian students. The competition was first held in 2021 and is designed to stimulate interest in energy conservation, sustainability, and related technologies.

ONEE is realized by the Brazilian National Electricity Regulatory Agency (ANEEL), organized by EDP Brazil, and coordinated by the Brazilian Association of Electricity Distributors (Abradee). The competition is divided into two main phases. Participants are given one week to complete the written test, which can be taken either in person or online. The test lasts two uninterrupted hours and evaluates the students' understanding of energy efficiency concepts.

== Objective ==
The primary goal of ONEE is to foster education and awareness about energy efficiency in Brazil. It seeks to encourage students to learn about various energy-saving practices, technologies, and policies that can help reduce energy consumption and mitigate environmental impacts. By participating in the competition, students gain knowledge about sustainable energy use, renewable energy sources, and the importance of reducing the ecological footprint of energy production and consumption.

== Format ==
The Olympiad consists of two phases:

1. First Phase (Games): The initial phase of the competition involves a series of interactive and educational games.
2. Second Phase (Writing): Students who advance past the first phase enter the writing phase. In this part of the competition, participants are tasked with written works on topics related to energy efficiency.

Before the examination, participants have access to four study modules that cover key topics in energy efficiency. These modules are designed to provide students with the necessary knowledge and preparation for the exam. Participants in the Brazilian National Energy Efficiency Olympiad are recognized for their achievements through a system of awards, which includes gold, silver, and bronze medals.
