= WEG S.A. =

Brazilian electronics company

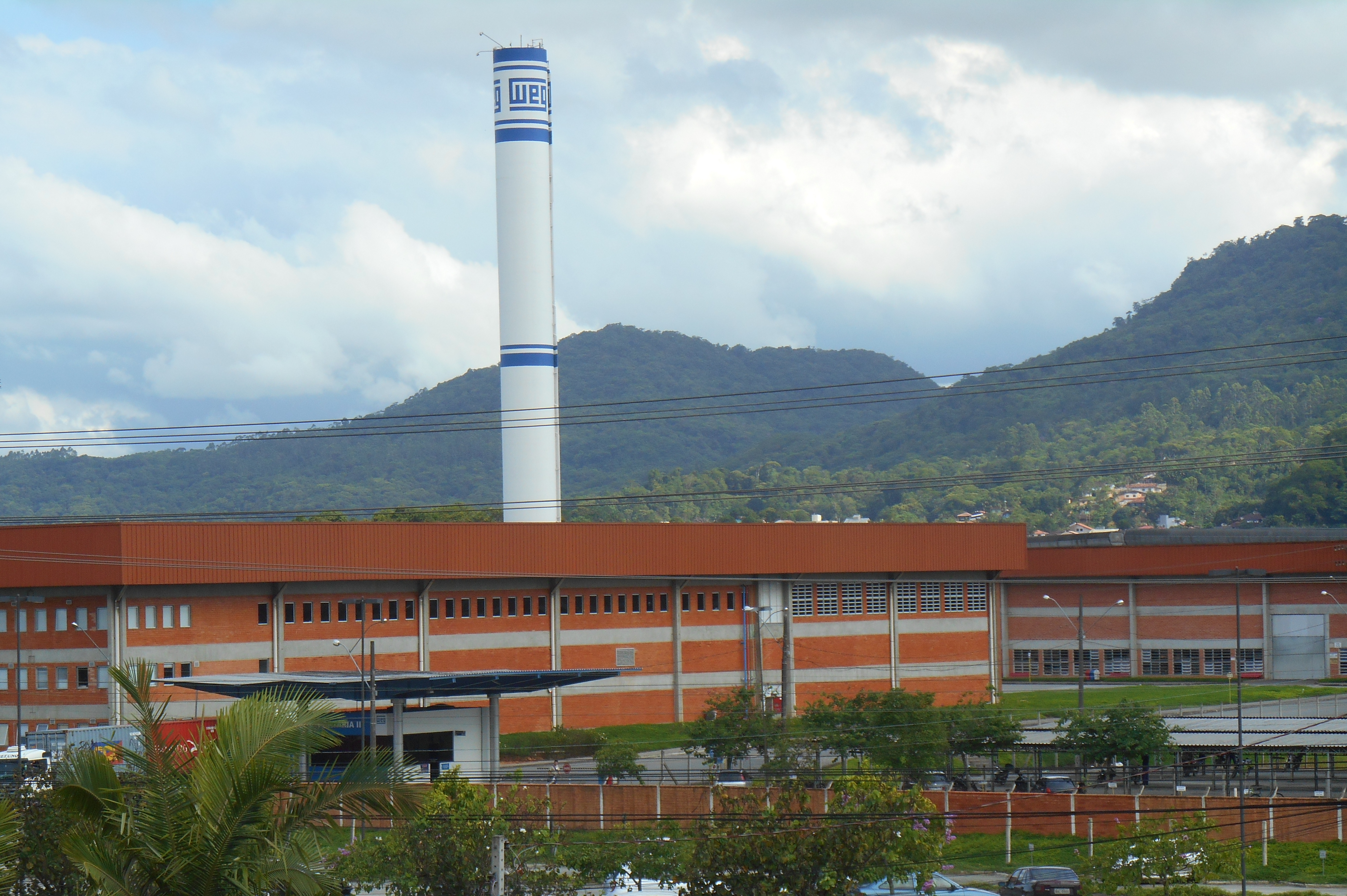
- Front view of "WEG II, Asa Leste", a unit of WEG Industries in Jaraguá do Sul
- Type: Sociedade Anônima
- Traded as: B3: WEGE3; Ibovespa Component
- Industry: Electrical equipment
- Founded: 16 September 1961; 65 years ago
- Headquarters: Jaraguá do Sul, Brazil
- Area served: Worldwide
- Key people: Décio da Silva (Chairman); Alberto Kuba (CEO)
- Products: electric motors, industrial automation and control, industrial sensors, generators, alternators, industrial gearboxes, transformers, switchgears, electrical substations, electric panels, BESS, wind and steam turbines, motor drives, coatings and varnishes
- Revenue: ▲US$6.82 billion (2024)
- Number of employees: c. 40,000
- Subsidiaries: Zest WEG Group
- Website: weg.net

WEG S.A. is a Brazilian company operating worldwide in the electrical engineering, power, and automation technology areas. It is headquartered in Jaraguá do Sul, Brazil, and was founded in 1961.

The company produces electric motors, generators, alternators, transformers, turbines, BESS, drives, coatings, and provides industrial automation services, among other products and integrated solutions related to electric systems.

WEG was founded in 1961 by Werner Ricardo Voigt, Eggon João da Silva and Geraldo Werninghaus, the name of the company being an acronym formed from the first names of the founders. The company has operations in around 140 countries, with approximately 40,000 employees. It's one of the largest manufacturers of electric motors and associated equipment in the world.

== History ==
The company Eletromotores Jaraguá was created on 16 September 1961 by Werner Ricardo Voigt, Eggon João da Silva and Geraldo Werninghaus (respectively an electrician, an administrator and a mechanic). Years later changed its name to Eletromotores WEG SA, the name WEG being formed with the first letter of each founder's first name.

Initially producing electric motors, WEG started diversifying its activities during the eighties, with the production of electric components, products for industrial automation, power and distribution transformers, liquid and powder paints and electrical insulation varnishes. The company grew into a global motor manufacturer.

In 1968, WEG created CentroWEG, a training center to aid in the lack of qualified professionals in the area of mechanical engineers.

In May 2008, WEG announced a new factory in India.

In February 2012, the Canadian manufacturer Ballard Power Systems signed a deal with WEG to assess the market opportunities for hydrogen PEM fuel cell products and services in applications.

In February 2019, WEG acquired Energy Storage System, the storage business of US-based Northern Power Systems (NPS). WEG had previously bought the utility-scale turbine business of NPS in 2016. In May 2019, WEG signed a deal with the aerospace conglomerate Embraer to work on new electrical propulsion systems for aircraft.

In May 2019, WEG also introduced the 4MW wind turbine. By 2024, WEG also started producing 7MW wind turbines.

In 2024, WEG acquired the industrial electric motors and generators business of Regal Rexnord Corporation, including the Marathon, Cemp, and Rotor brands. WEG will also integrate a team of approximately 2,800 employees operating in 10 factories located in seven countries (United States, Mexico, China, India, Italy, the Netherlands, and Canada), as well as commercial subsidiaries in 11 countries. The net operating revenue of these businesses in 2022 was approximately $542 million.

== Activities ==
=== Description ===
The company has subsidiaries in 37 countries, and production is distributed in manufacturing plants in 15 countries, including: Brazil, Argentina, Colombia, India, Mexico, Portugal, Austria, Germany, China, South Africa, Turkey, and United States.

=== Products ===
- Generation (Generators, wind turbines, steam turbines, water turbines)
- Transmission (EPC, switchgear, transformers)
- Distribution (EPC, transformers)
- Electric products (motors, switchgear, industrial gearboxes, frequency inverters, AC/DC converters, contactors, fuses, circuit breakers and servomotors, etc.)
- Coatings and Varnishes (Marine, Automotive, Industrial)
- Battery Energy Store (BESS)
- Automation (Hardware and Software)
- Integration Engineering with products of different manufacturers
