= CVC Brasil =

Brazilian travel company

CVC Brasil Operadora e Agência de Viagens S.A.
- Trade name: CVC
- Formerly: Agência de Viagens CVC
- Type: Public
- Traded as: B3
- Industry: Tourism
- Founded: May 28, 1972; 54 years ago
- Founder: Guilherme Paulus; Carlos Vicente Cerchiari
- Headquarters: Santo André, São Paulo, Brazil
- Key people: Fabio Godinho (CEO)
- Net income: R$6.6 billion (2021)
- Website: cvc.com.br; cvccorp.com.br

CVC CORP is a Brazilian holding company specializing in tourism, founded and headquartered in Santo André, São Paulo.

The company began in May 1972 with the creation of Agência de Viagens CVC and adopted its current name after going public on the Brazilian stock market.

Following this restructuring, the corporation acquired several travel companies throughout the years. Today, it is the largest tourism company in Latin America, with operations in Brazil and Argentina.
