= CEMIG =

Brazilian power company

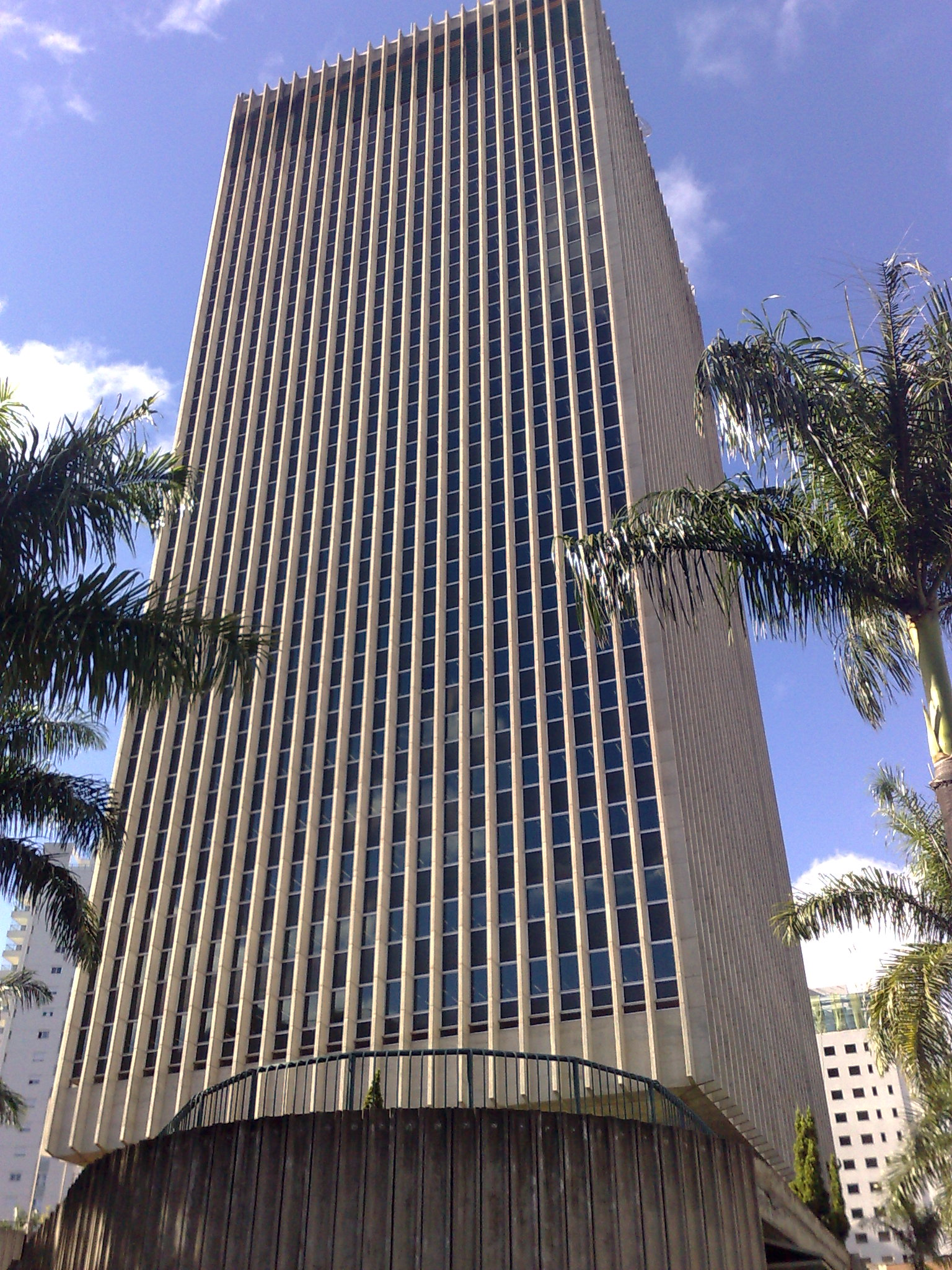
- Headquarters in Belo Horizonte
- Type: Sociedade Anônima
- Traded as: B3: CMIG3, CMIG4; NYSE: CIG; BMAD: XCMIG; Ibovespa Component
- ISIN: BRCMGDDBS009
- Industry: Electricity
- Founded: 1952
- Founder: Juscelino Kubitschek
- Headquarters: Belo Horizonte, Minas Gerais, Brazil
- Key people: Bernardo Afonso Salomão de Alvarenga (CEO)
- Products: Electrical power natural gas
- Services: Electricity distribution Electricity transmission telecommunications
- Revenue: ▲US$ 6.5 billion (2017)
- Net income: ▲US$ 302.4 million (2017)
- Number of employees: 16,300
- Subsidiaries: Light S.A. Taesa
- Website: www.cemig.com.br

Companhia Energética de Minas Gerais S.A. (CEMIG; English: Energy Company of Minas Gerais) is a Brazilian power company headquartered in Belo Horizonte, capital of the state of Minas Gerais. The company is one of the main electricity concessionaires in Brazil. It operates in the areas of generation, transmission, distribution and commercialization of electric energy and also in the distribution of natural gas. The company is responsible for 12% of Brazil's distribution. It is the fourth-largest electricity company in Brazil by revenue after Eletrobras, Energisa and CPFL Energia.

CEMIG is present in 22 Brazilian states and in Chile. With around 50 power plants in operation, most of them hydroelectric, the company owns around 6,000 MW of generation capacity. Just over half of Cemig's stock is owned by the state of Minas Gerais.

The company is responsible for serving about 18 million people in 774 municipalities of Minas Gerais and for the management of the largest network of electricity distribution in South America, with more than 400 thousand km of lines.

The stock is traded on B3 where it is part of the Ibovespa index. It is also traded on the New York Stock Exchange. It is also part of The Global Dow and of the Latibex, an index for Latin American companies in Madrid Stock Exchange.

The company owns 43% of Taesa, a Brazilian electric company.

== History ==
Cemig was founded in 1952 by the governor of Minas Gerais, Juscelino Kubitschek. It is one of the largest integrated companies in the electricity sector in South America, in number of customers, and one of the largest in Latin America, in kilometers of network and equipment and installations. The group comprises more than 103 companies, 09 consortiums and 02 Equity Investment Funds. It is a publicly traded company controlled by the Government of the State of Minas Gerais and has 200,000 shareholders in 39 countries. Its shares are traded on B3, the New York Stock Exchange and the Madrid Stock Exchange.

== Sustainability ==
It is the only company in the electricity sector in Latin America to be part of the Dow Jones Sustainability World Index (DJSI World), created by the Dow Jones in 1999. The index recognizes the capacity of companies in corporate sustainability and creation of value for shareholders in long term, by being able to seize the opportunities and manage the risks associated with economic, environmental and social factors.

Cemig is also the only concessionaire in the electricity sector in Latin America to be part of The Global Dow Index. The index was created in 2008, and includes 150 world-leading companies from 25 countries.

== See also ==
- List of Brazilian government enterprises
