= Grupo DPSP =

Brazilian pharmacy chain

- Type: Private
- Industry: Drugstore
- Founded: 2011
- Headquarters: São Paulo, Brazil
- Key people: Marcelo Doll (CEO)
- Products: Drugs; Generic drug Cosmetics
- Revenue: ▲US$ 3.0 billion (2017)
- Number of employees: 26,000
- Website: www.grupodpsp.com.br

Grupo DPSP is the second largest Brazilian drugstore chain after RD. The company was founded in 2011 through the merger of São Paulo-based Drogaria São Paulo and Rio de Janeiro-based Drogarias Pacheco.

== Brands ==
The company has more than 1,200 stores in 10 Brazilian states branded as Drogaria São Paulo and Drogarias Pacheco.
