= EDP Brasil =

EDP Brasil S.A.
- Type: Sociedade Anônima
- Traded as: B3: ENBR3; Ibovespa Component
- Industry: Electricity
- Founded: 1996
- Headquarters: São Paulo, Brazil
- Key people: Miguel Nuno Simões Nunes Ferreira Setas(Director-Presidente) Carlos Emanuel Baptista Andrade(Director Vice-Presidente de Comercialização e Desenvolvimento de Negócios); Luiz Otavio Assis Henriques (Director Vice-Presidente de Operações da Geração); Michel Nunes Itkes(Director Vice-Presidente de Distribuição) Henrique Manuel Marques Faria Lima Freire(Director Vice-Presidente Financeiro)
- Products: Electrical power
- Services: Electricity distribution, generation, commercialization and Renewable energy
- Revenue: ▲US$ 3.5 billion (2017)
- Net income: ▼US$ 184.6 million (2017)
- Number of employees: 2,600
- Parent: EDP - Energias de Portugal
- Website: www.edp.com.br

EDP Brasil is one of the largest Brazilian electric utility companies. It is a subsidiary of EDP - Energias de Portugal in Brazil. The company was founded in 1996 in São Paulo.

Through its subsidiaries the company generates, distributes and sells electric energy in nine Brazilian states and in the generation segment, representing 2,3 GW of installed capacity. In the distribution segment, the group operates in two states (São Paulo and Espírito Santo) and serves a total of 3.1 million customers. In the commercialization segment, EDP operates in the free contracting environment both in the concession areas of our distributors as well as in other concession areas and in renewable energy segment the company operates wind and hydro electric plants with an installed generation capacity of 2.381 MW.

It is the third largest non-state electricity commercialization company in Brazil, the fifth largest non-state generation and the fourth largest non-state in energy distribution.

On listing its capital in July 2005, it signed up to the São Paulo Stock Exchange’s (B3) Novo Mercado.

For the seventh consecutive year, the company is a component of B3's Corporate Sustainability Index (ISE).

The Portuguese energy group EDP announced In March, 2023, a plan to close capital of EDP Brasil, or Energias do Brasil, aiming to bring greater flexibility in financial and operational management to the local subsidiary.
