= YDUQS =

Brazilian education company

- Type: Sociedade Anônima
- Traded as: B3: YDUQ3; Ibovespa Component
- Industry: Higher education
- Founded: 1970
- Headquarters: Rio de Janeiro, Brazil
- Key people: Eduardo Parente, (CEO)
- Revenue: ▲US$ 1.0 billion (2017)
- Net income: ▲US$ 120.8 million (2017)
- Number of employees: 13,548
- Website: www.yduqs.com.br

YDUQS is a publicly traded Brazilian holding company in the education sector. YDUQS serves over 750,000 students

== History ==
YDUQS was incorporated on March 31, 2007, as Estácio Participações. The group changed its name to YDUQS in 2019.

In 2019, YDUQS announced the acquisition of the Toledo University Center (Centro Universitário Toledo) – Unitoledo is located in Araçatuba-SP. In the same year, YDUQS acquired educational institutions previously owned by Adtalem Educational: Damásio Educational, UniToledo, Clio, SJT, UniFacid, UniFanor, UniFBV, UniRuy, Faculdade Martha Falcão, UniFavip, UniMetrocamp, Facimp, and Faci. These were the biggest acquisitions in the company's history.

In 2020, YDUQS announced the acquisition of four educational institutions of Athenas Educational: São Paulo Faculty, Pimenta Bueno Faculty, Meta University Center and Pantanal Faculty.

== Programs ==
YDUQS's educational institutions offer Undergraduate, Graduate, Master's and PhD Programs, in addition to extension courses, through on-site, distance learning and hybrid modalities. For onsite students, the educational model combines digital with onsite learning.
