= Valinhos =

- Municipality
- Municipality of Valinhos
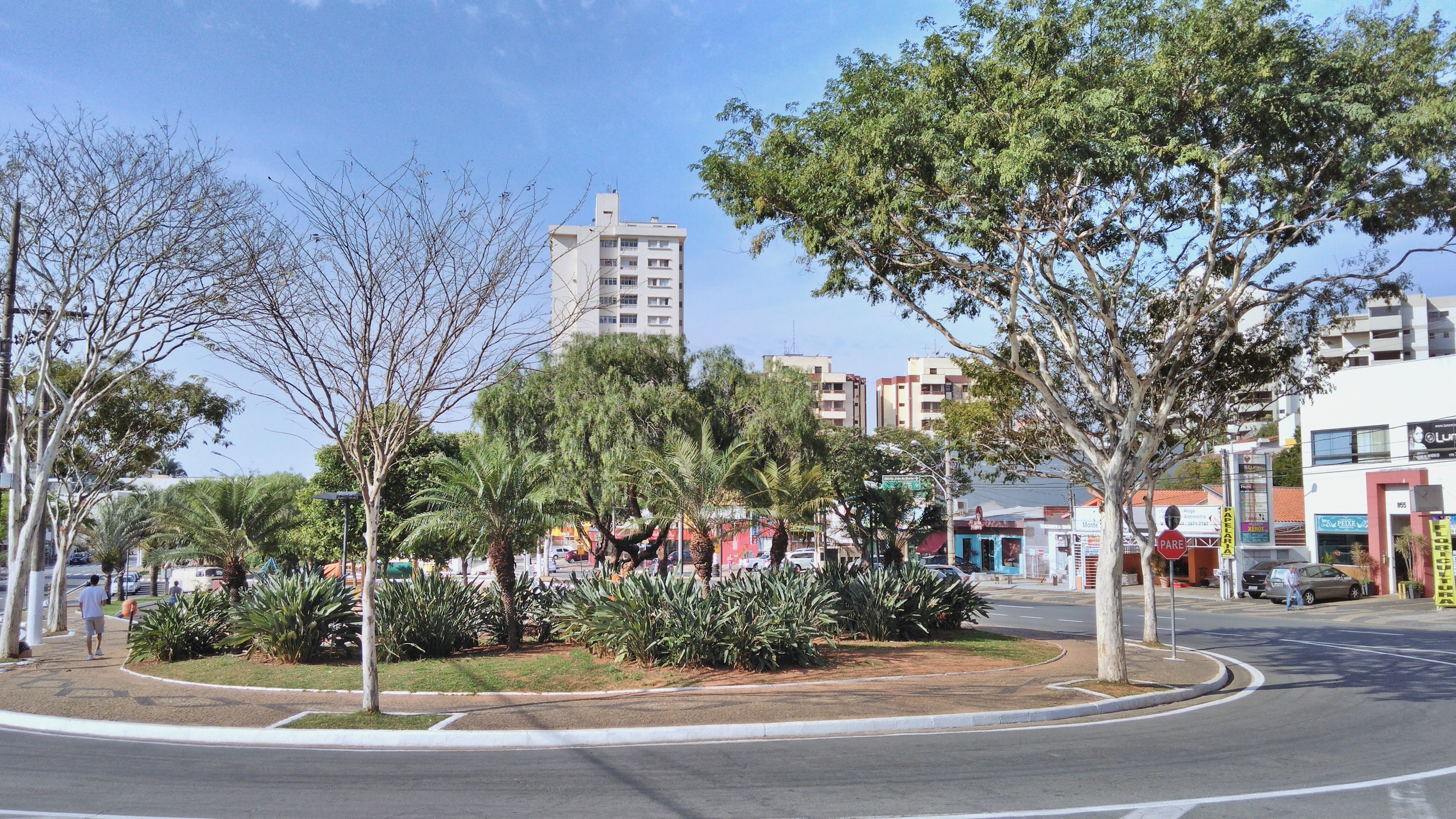

- Flag Coat of arms
- Motto: In libertate labor (Latin)
- Location in São Paulo state

- Location in Brazil
- Coordinates: 22°58′14″S 46°59′45″W
- Country: Brazil
- Region: Southeast Brazil
- State: São Paulo
- Metropolitan Region: Campinas

Government
  - Mayor: Franklin Duarte de Lima (PL)

Area
  - Total: 148.54 km^{2} (57.35 sq mi)
- Elevation: 660 m (2,170 ft)

Population (2022 Census)
  - Total: 126,373
  - Estimate (2025): 132,258
  - Density: 850.77/km^{2} (2,203.5/sq mi)
- Time zone: UTC−3 (BRT)
- Postal code: 13270-000
- Phone code: +55 19
- HDI (2010): 0.819 – very high

Valinhos (Portuguese pronunciation: [vaˈliɲus]) is a municipality (município) in the state of São Paulo, Brazil. It is the birthplace of Adoniran Barbosa. Valinhos is famous for its purple fig, the theme of its annual Fig Fest. It is part of the Metropolitan Region of Campinas. The population is 126,325 (2022 Census) in an area of 148.54 square kilometres (57.35 square miles). Its elevation is 660 m (2,165.35 ft). Its name means 'little valleys' in Portuguese.

== History ==
The city was founded on 2 December 1732 by Alexandre Simões Vieira. A passage between the villages of São Paulo and Jundiaí had been opened. The main economic foundation of the town in the 19th century was the production of coffee, figs and grapes. Later on, a railway was created to transport the products to the Port of Santos.

Since the fig has been a town's symbol, the city counsel organizes the Festa do Figo (a traditional Fig Fest, attended by more than 75,000 people yearly). The city is mainly composed by closed neighbourhoods, condominium complexes and some residential buildings. There is also a Colégio Visconde de Porto Seguro.

== Geography ==
Mostly two thirds of the area is a rural community scattered around 89 km^{2} (34 sq mi), however, the urban area is growing as soon as the neighbourhoods are built. Around the city are the most important highways of the state of São Paulo, which are named Anhanguera, Bandeirantes and Dom Pedro I. They connect all parts of the state and are considered the best highways in the country.

== Economy ==
Part of the greater Campinas, Valinhos hosts branches from several multinational companies; Vermeer, Wenger, Cogna Educação, Chr. Hansen, Eaton, Unilever, Schlegel-Giesse and many others. According to the magazine Exame, Valinhos is the 12th best city in Brazil in terms of life quality.

== Demography ==
- 2018: 127,123 citizens

Population (in percentage)

- Urban 95%
- Rural 5%

Area

- Urban 65.9 km^{2} (25.4 sq mi)
- Rural 88.0 km^{2} (34.0 sq mi)

| Population (2009) | Men | Women | Voters |
|---|---|---|---|
| 107,453 | 50,112 | 49,216 | 59,934 |

== Health, security and education ==
These three sections are provided by the government in the town, where children and teenagers can learn, spend their free time, and play sports. There are two hospitals in the town that provide free care for two-thirds of the population, while a private hospital serves the remaining third.

== Media ==
In telecommunications, the city was served by Telecomunicações de São Paulo. In July 1998, this company was acquired by Telefónica, which adopted the Vivo brand in 2012. The company is currently an operator of cell phones, fixed lines, internet (fiber optics/4G) and television (satellite and cable).

== See also ==
- List of municipalities in São Paulo
- Interior of São Paulo
