= Itaúsa =

Brazilian multinational conglomerate holding company

Itaúsa Investimentos Itaú S.A.
- Type: Sociedade Anônima
- Traded as: B3: ITSA3, ITSA4; Ibovespa Component
- Industry: Holding
- Founded: 1966
- Headquarters: São Paulo, Brazil
- Key people: José Carlos Moraes Abreu, (Chairman); Alfredo Egydio Arruda Villela Filho, (CEO)
- Products: Banking, Health, Chemicals, Fashion, and others
- Revenue: ▲US$ 1.5 billion (2016)
- Net income: ▲US$ 2.5 billion (2017)
- Number of employees: 126,800
- Subsidiaries: Itaú Unibanco; Duratex; Alpargatas S.A.
- Website: www.itausa.com.br

Itaúsa is a Brazilian multinational conglomerate holding company headquartered in São Paulo, Brazil. Founded in 1966, It is one of the largest private conglomerates in Brazil and in the world. The company controls several companies active in areas such as finance, real estate, industrial, health, chemical, and fashion. The main companies that Itaúsa controls are Itaú Unibanco, Duratex and Alpargatas S.A.

The control of the company rests with the Setubal and Villela families along with the Camargo family as minority holder.
