= Economy of São Paulo =

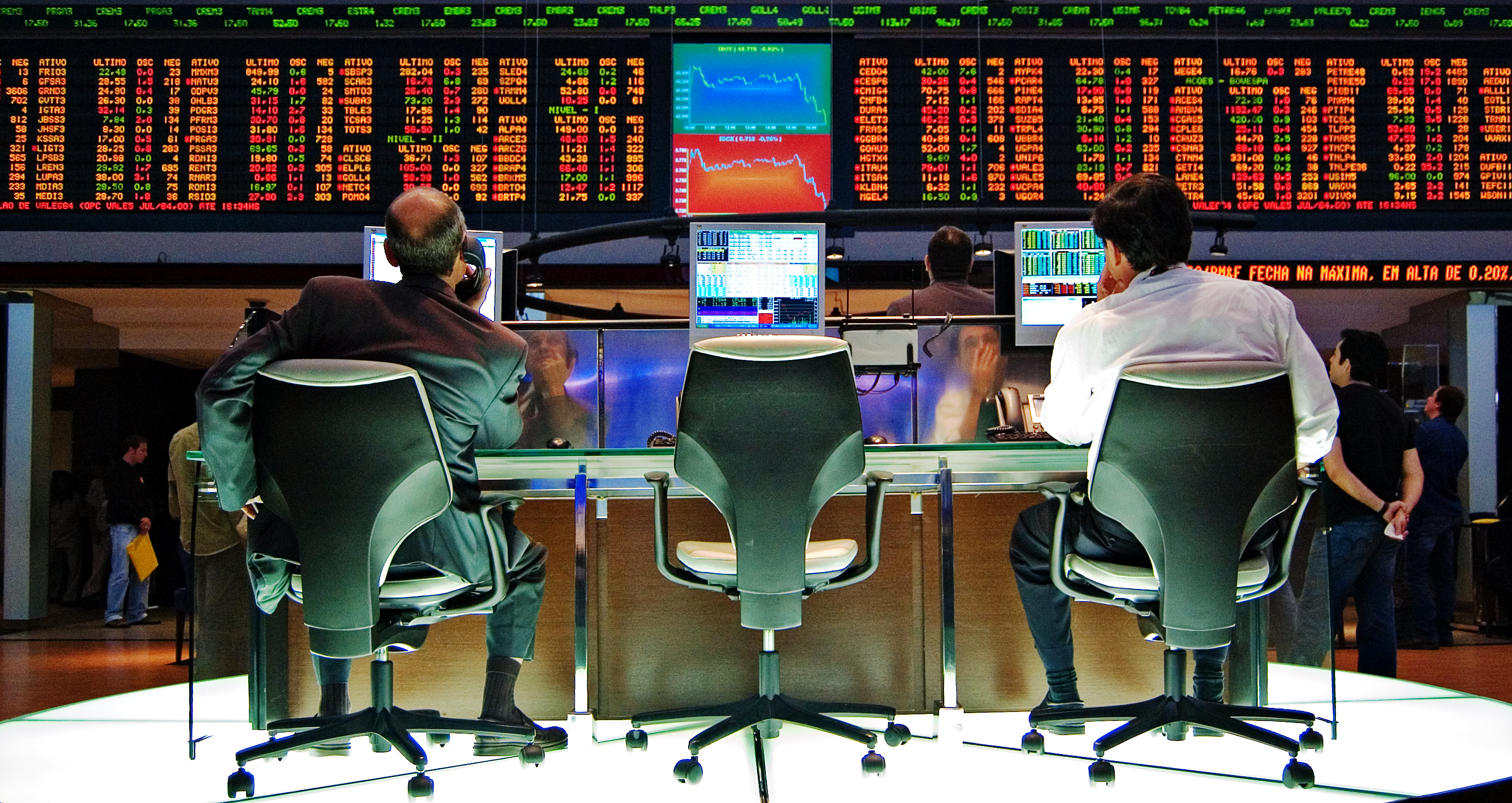
Trade panel of BM&F Bovespa, the São Paulo Stock Exchange

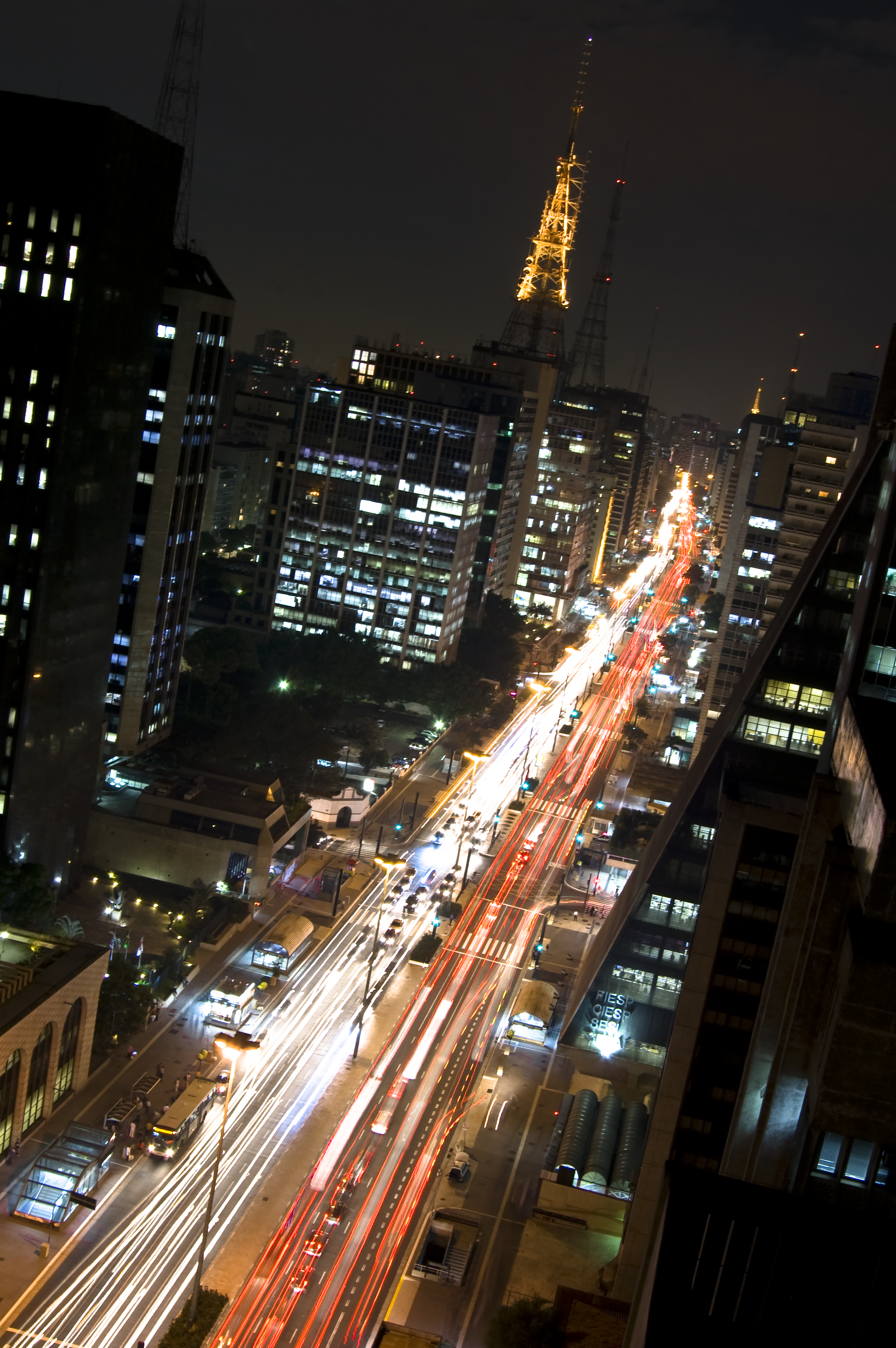
Paulista Avenue is the international financial centre of the city.

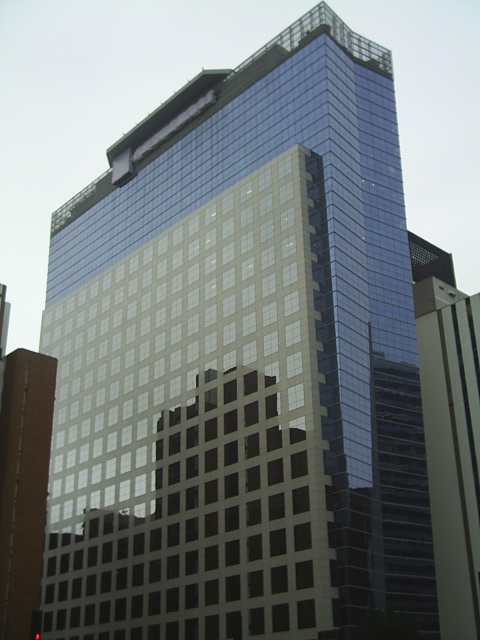
The headquarters of Petrobrás in São Paulo

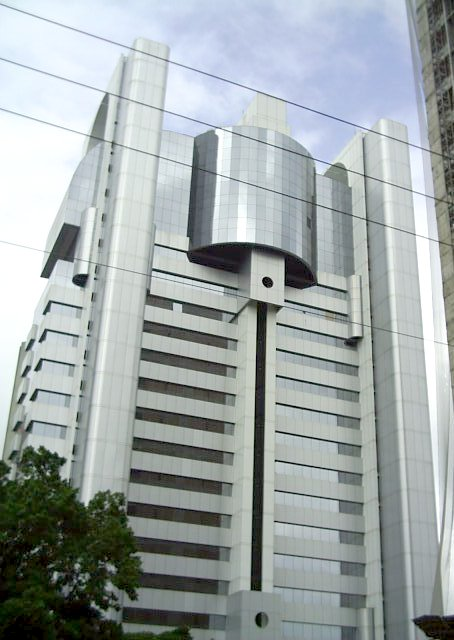
The headquarters of SAP AG in São Paulo

São Paulo is one of the largest cities in the world economically, and is expected to be the 6th largest in 2025. According to data of Fecomercio/SP, its gross domestic product (GDP) in 2026 was $3.31T.

The biggest financial center in Brazil and one of the biggest financial centers in the world, São Paulo's economy is going through a deep transformation. Once a city with a strong industrial character, São Paulo's economy has become increasingly based on the tertiary sector, focusing on services and businesses for the country. The city is also unique among Brazilian cities for its large number of foreign corporations. Many analysts point to São Paulo as an important global city, even though this assignment can be criticized considering its serious problems of social exclusion and spatial segregation. Although being the most important financial centre of the country, São Paulo also presents a high degree of informality in its economy.

== Overview ==
São Paulo is the business center of the Mercosur economy. Acclaimed as a city of business tourism, attracting today's biggest and most important international events, be they in the economic, cultural, scientific or sporting area. It holds more than 200 events per day, offering more than 250 thousand square meters of space in pavilions and areas for congresses and fairs. This is without taking into account the supply of spaces within hotels, which adds another 70 thousand square meters, suitable for holding events. According to the International Congress and Convention Association (ICCA) that ranks the greatest event centers in the world, São Paulo is the most important destination for international events in the Americas. São Paulo is also among Top 20 destinations for events in the world and left behind destinations like Madrid, Sydney, Athens and Vancouver. Adding space in nightclubs, cultural and business areas, clubs and other alternatives to these numbers, São Paulo boasts approximately 430,000 square meters for the holding of any type of event.

The city's accommodation sector comprised 426 hotels, approximately 44,000 accommodation units and about 61,000 beds in 2025, with an average hotel occupancy rate of 62.96%. São Paulo received 47.2 millions tourist in 2025, while the first half of 2026 recorded 25.4 million visitors, an increase of 13.3% compared with the same period of a year earlier. Tourism activity is supported by city 's cultural and gastronomy sectors; municipal tourism data list more than 20,000 restaurants representing cuisines from 52 countries, in addition to museums, theatres, and other cultural venues.

In 2005, the city of São Paulo collected R$90 billion in taxes, and the city budget was R$15 billion; these figures show that São Paulo contributes to redistribution of wealth. The city has 1,500 bank branches. There are 70 shopping malls. Of all the international companies with business in Brazil, 63% have their head offices in São Paulo. According to Mystery Shopping International, the Oscar Freire Street is the eighth most luxurious in the world.

In higher education, the University of São Paulo (USP) is in the top 100 public universities in the world and, recently, in the annual ranking of the British newspaper The Times, as the first university in South America. There is also a wide range of short courses, lectures, seminars, literary discussions and several universities and cultural centers teaching from handicraft to technology.

The São Paulo Stock Exchange (BM&F Bovespa) is Brazil's official stock and bonds exchange. The BM&F Bovespa is the largest stock exchange in Latin America and third largest in the world. In the Stock Exchange, R$6 billion (US$3.5 billion) change hands every day.

=== Comparisons ===
If the city of São Paulo were a country, its economy would be the 47th in the world, bigger than Egypt and Kuwait, for example, about the same size as Hungary, New Zealand or Israel. The economy of the city of São Paulo would also be bigger than 22 U.S. states, such as Hawaii and New Hampshire.

If Greater São Paulo were a country would be the thirty-third richest nation in the world (in nominal GDP), ahead of the United Arab Emirates and Hong Kong for example and twenty-eighth richest nation ahead of Belgium and Venezuela (in GDP PPP). São Paulo is the best city to do business in Latin America. The large growth of São Paulo GDP is due to the great economic potential of the city and the appreciation of the Brazilian real to the U.S. dollar. The per capita gross domestic product (GDP) for the city was R$57,759.39 (2017). According to PricewaterhouseCoopers annual economic growth of the city is 4.2%.

== International trade ==
As of 2014, São Paulo is the third largest exporting municipality in Brazil after Parauapebas, PA and Rio de Janeiro, RJ. In that year São Paulo's exported goods totaled $7.32B (USD) or 3.02% of Brazil's total exports. The top five material goods exported by São Paulo are Soybean (21%), Raw Sugar (19%), Coffee (6.5%), Sulfate Chemical Wood Pulp (5.6%), and Corn (4.4%).
