= Barueri =

- Municipality
- Município de Barueri
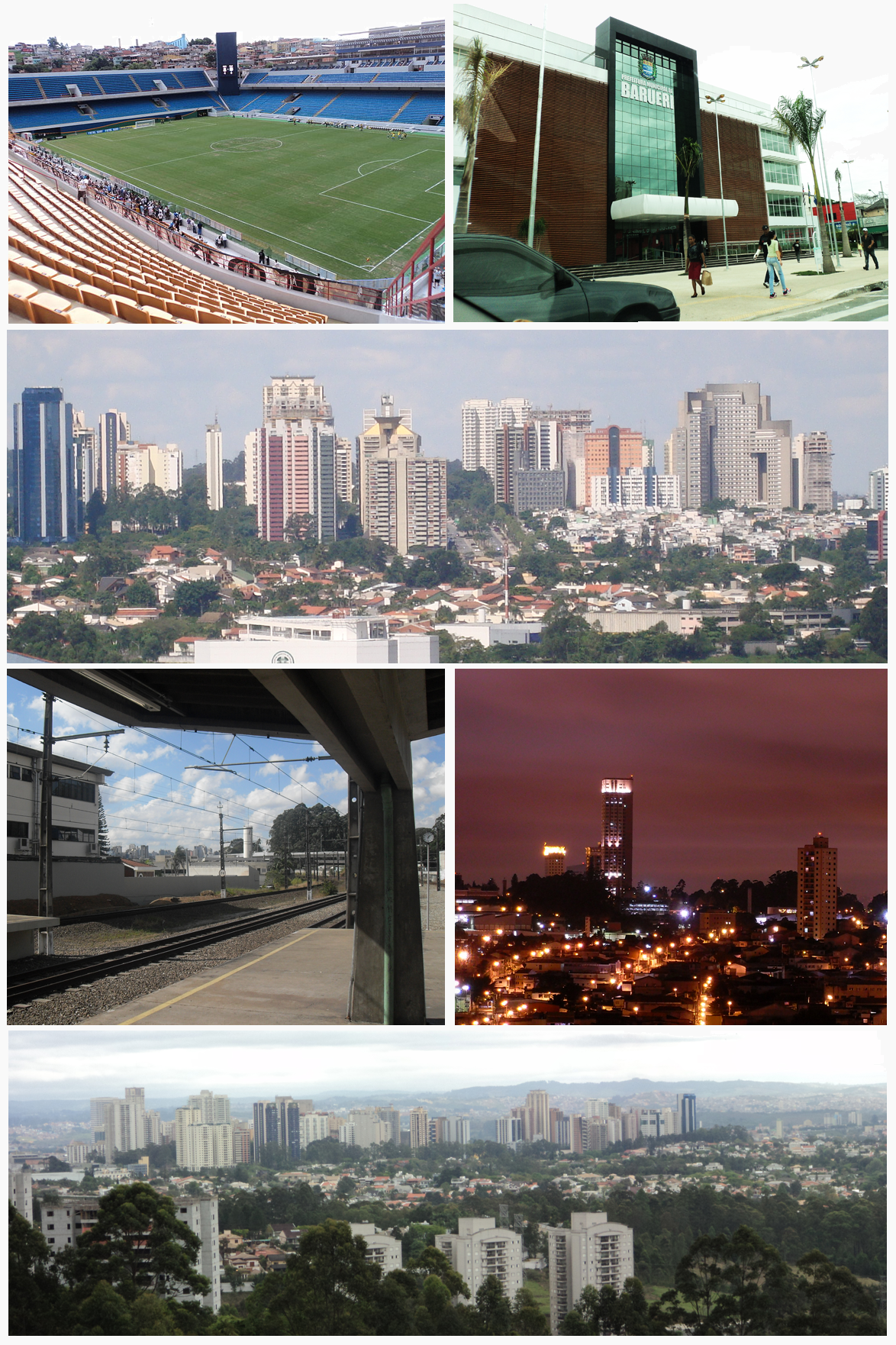

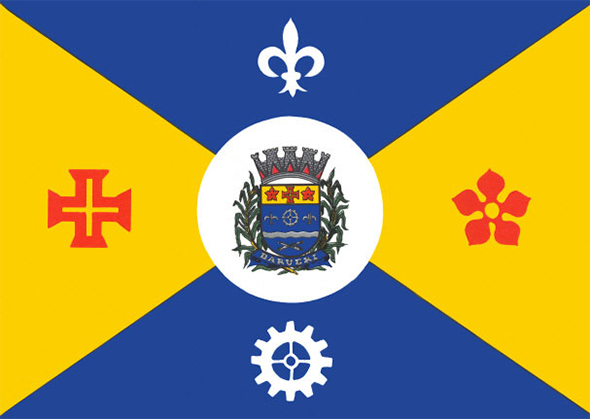
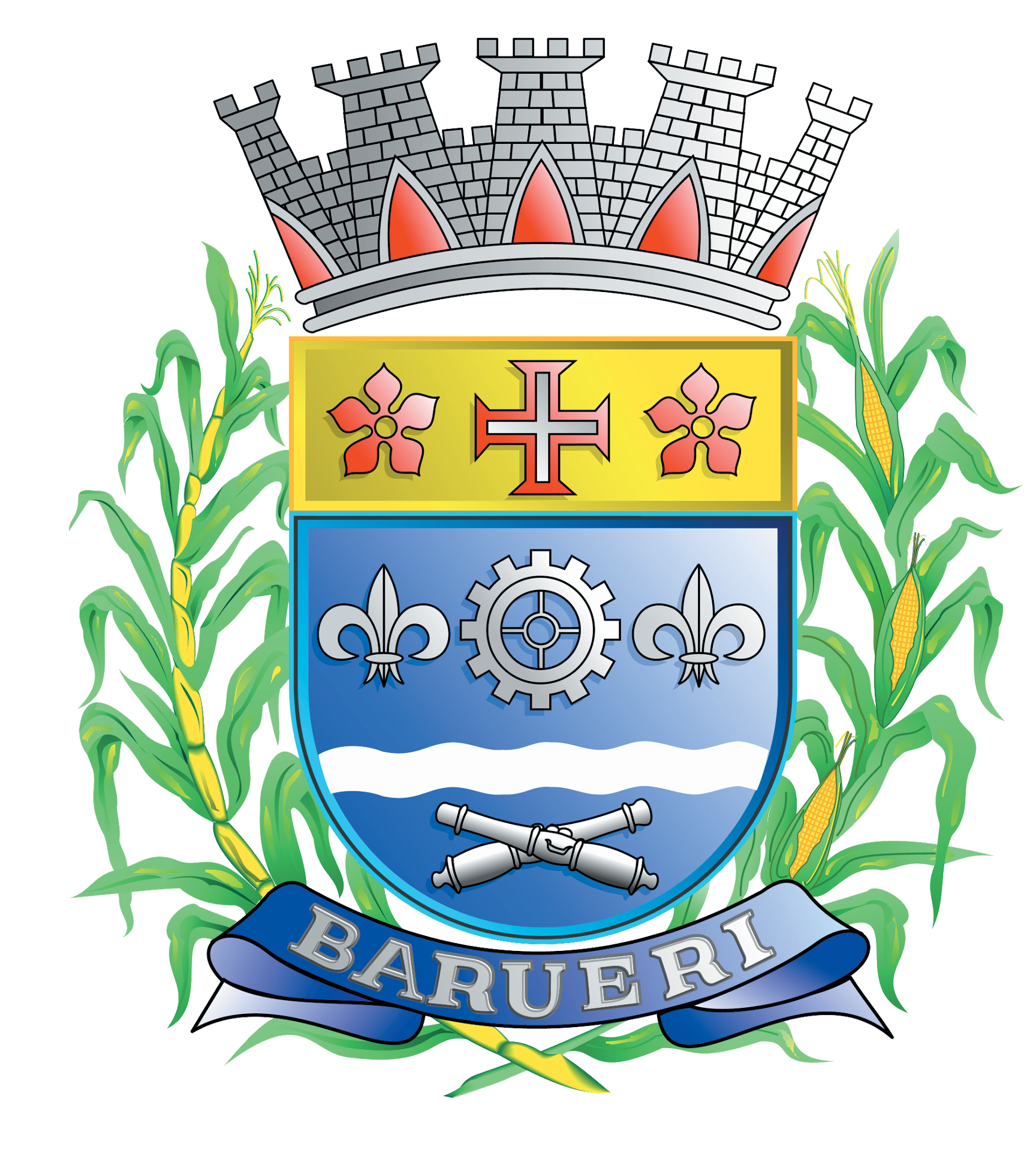
- Flag Coat of arms
- Nickname: Red flower
- Motto: Flor vermelha que encanta
- Location of Barueri in the state of São Paulo

- Location of Barueri in Brazil
- Coordinates: 23°30′40″S 46°52′35″W
- Country: Brazil
- Region: Southeast
- State: São Paulo
- Metropolitan Region: Metropolitan Region of São Paulo
- Founded: 1949

Government
  - Mayor: Rubens Furlan (PSDB)

Area
  - Total: 65.705 km^{2} (25.369 sq mi)
- Elevation: 719 m (2,359 ft)

Population (2022 Brazilian census)
  - Total: 316,473
  - Estimate (2025): 333,737
  - Density: 4,000.29/km^{2} (10,360.7/sq mi)
- Time zone: UTC-3 (Brasilia Official Time)
  - Summer (DST): UTC-2 (Brazilian Daylight Saving Time)
- Postal Code: 16401-000
- Area code: +55 11

Barueri (Portuguese pronunciation: [bɐˌɾu.eˈɾi] or [baɾweˈɾi]) is a Brazilian municipality in the State of São Paulo located in the northwestern part of the Metropolitan Region of São Paulo. The population is 316,473 (2022 census) in an area of 65.70 km^{2} (25.37 sq mi).

Its boundaries are Santana de Parnaíba to the north, Osasco in the east, Carapicuíba in the Southeast, Jandira to the south and southwest, and Itapevi the west. The city is served by the trains of line 8 of the Companhia Paulista de Trens Metropolitanos (literally São Paulo Metropolitan Railway Company), (CPTM).

== History ==
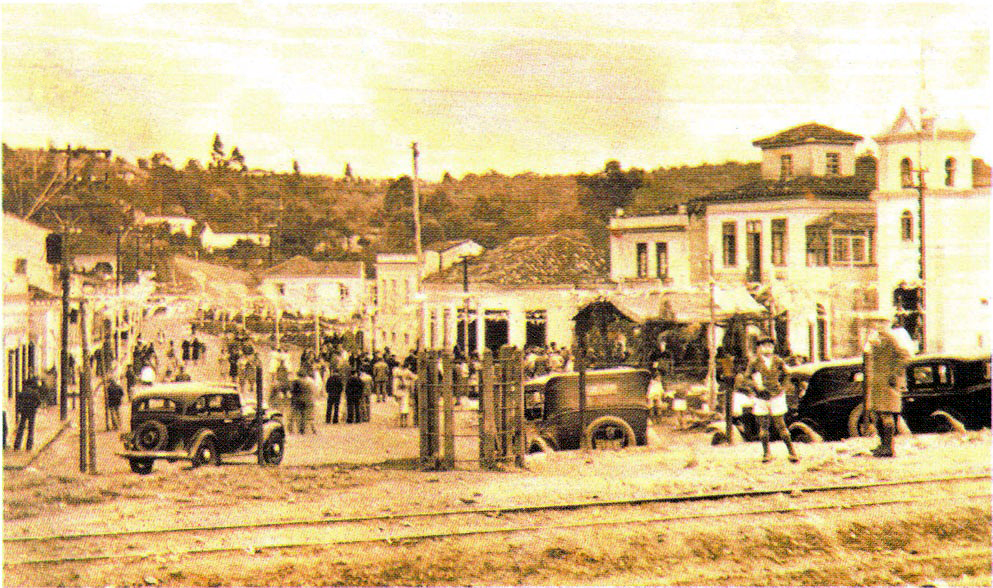
Centro area of Barueri in 1920

Barueri means "Red flower that amazes" in a Tupi–Guarani language. According to historians, the history of Barueri dates back to November 11, 1560 with the establishment of Nossa Senhora Da Escada Chapel by jesuit missionary José de Anchieta and his further settlement. The hamlet grew to the point of the construction, in 1870 of the Sorocabana Railway that initiated its duties in 1875 turning Barueri into an important point of connection between São Paulo, Santana de Parnaíba and Pirapora do Bom Jesus.

Still belonging to the city of Santana de Parnaíba, Barueri was established as an independent city on December 24, 1948 due to its growth.

Map of the state of São Paulo (1948).

In 1964, the city's territory shrank to two thirds of its original size when Carapicuíba emancipated from it.

== Demography ==
Historical population (municipality)
| Year | Population | %± |
|---|---|---|
| 1950 | 10,447 | — |
| 1960 | 31,562 | 202.1% |
| 1970 | 37,808 | 19.8% |
| 1980 | 75,338 | 99.3% |
| 1991 | 130,799 | 73.6% |
| 2000 | 208,281 | 59.2% |
| 2010 | 240,749 | 15.6% |
| 2022 | 316,473 | 31.5% |

== Economy ==
Companies like Azul Brazilian Airlines, Enel, Cielo, Redecard, DASA, Walmart Brasil and others have their headquarters in Barueri.

== Media ==
In telecommunications, the city was served by Companhia Telefônica Brasileira until 1973, when it began to be served by Telecomunicações de São Paulo. In July 1998, this company was acquired by Telefónica, which adopted the Vivo brand in 2012.

The company is currently an operator of cell phones, fixed lines, internet (fiber optics/4G) and television (satellite and cable).

== Sports ==
The most notable football (soccer) club in the city is Grêmio Barueri, which plays at Arena Barueri, in 2009 played in the Brazilian top league. In February 2010 the team was moved to Presidente Prudente, a city that is located in western São Paulo (state). After moving to Presidente Prudente the team's new home stadium was Estádio Eduardo José Farah, which has a maximum capacity of 44,414 people.

Also in 2010, Campinas Futebol Clube, relocated to Barueri and became Sport Club Barueri. In 2017, Oeste FC also moved to Barueri.

In 2006, some 2006 FIBA World Championship for Women basketball matches were hosted at the city's Barueri Arena, which is an indoor sporting arena.

== Notable people ==
- Bruno Caboclo (born 1995), basketball player in the Israeli Basketball Premier League
- Bilquis Evely (born 1990), comic book artist
- Thaís Fidélis (born 2001), artistic gymnast
- Bruna Furlan (born 1983), politician and lawyer
- Cláudia Santos (born 1997), Paralympic world champion adaptive rower
- Iago Teles (born 2000), professional rower for Londrina

== Religion ==
Christianity is present in the city as follows:

=== Catholic Church ===
The Catholic church in the municipality is part of the Diocese of Osasco.

=== Protestant Church ===
The most diverse evangelical beliefs are present in the city, mainly Pentecostal, including the Assemblies of God in Brazil (the largest evangelical church in the country), Christian Congregation in Brazil, among others. These denominations are growing more and more throughout Brazil.

== See also ==
- List of municipalities in São Paulo
