= Duratex =

Company in Brazil

Dexco S.A.
- Type: Sociedade Anônima
- Traded as: B3: DXCO3
- Industry: Engineered wood
- Founded: 1961
- Headquarters: São Paulo, Brazil
- Key people: Alfredo Setubal, (Chairman); Raul Guaragna, (CEO)
- Products: Plywood, Wood panels, Earthenware sanitary, Furniture, Metal fitting
- Revenue: ▲US$ 1.2 billion (2018)
- Net income: ▲US$ 69.8 million (2018)
- Number of employees: 10,667
- Parent: Itaúsa
- Website: www.dex.co

Dexco, formerly known as Duratex, is a publicly listed private Brazilian company, factory of fiberboards the main product, with shares traded at the B3 since 1951. The company previously only called Duratex is the result of the merger Duratex with Satipel Industrial, a company founded in 1971. It is controlled by the Itaúsa Group and Ligna Group. The company is the eighth largest producer of wood panels in the world and the largest in the Southern Hemisphere. Duratex operates in Brazil and Colombia.

Manufacturing wood products, sanitary vitreous chinaware and metal fittings aimed at the furniture industry and the civil construction sectors, Duratex S.A has ten industrial plants, located in the States of São Paulo, Minas Gerais and Rio Grande do Sul.

It is Brazilian market leader in the segment of reconstituted wooden boards – hardboards, particle boards, medium, high and super-density fiberboards (MDF/HDF/SDF), as well as laminated floorboards marketed under the Durafloor brand. It is Brazilian market leader in the segment of sanitary metal fittings, under the Deca and Hydra brands (the latter for flush valves), and has a significant market share in the sanitary vitreous chinaware segment, marketed under the Deca brand.

Duratex S.A is present in Argentina, the United States and Europe through the Deca Piazza, Duratex North America and Duratex Europe respectively.

It has about 209 thousand hectares of forests of planted forests.
