= Vibra Energia =

Brazilian petrol and convenience store company

Vibra Energia SA
- Type: Sociedade Anônima
- Traded as: B3: VBBR3
- Industry: Oil and Gas
- Founded: 1971
- Headquarters: Rio de Janeiro, Brazil
- Key people: Wilson Júnior (CEO)
- Products: Oil and Gas distributor
- Services: Gas Station
- Revenue: ▲US$ 27.79 billion (2024
- Net income: ▲US$ 1.06 Billion (2024)
- Number of employees: 4,000
- Website: www.vibraenergia.com.br

Vibra Energia (formerly Petrobras Distribuidora or BR) is the largest distributor and marketer of petroleum derivatives and biofuels (ethanol) of Brazil and Latin America. It was a subsidiary of Petrobras until 2021 but now it is a corporation. The company has more than 8,000 gas stations in Brazil. It was founded on November 12, 1971 and is headquartered in Rio de Janeiro.

Its largest competitor is Porto Alegre-based Ipiranga and Raízen (which operates filling stations branded as Shell).
