= Índice Bovespa =

Benchmark index of Brazilian stocks

The Bovespa Index (Portuguese: Índice Bovespa), best known as Ibovespa is the benchmark index of about 86 stocks traded on the B3 (Brasil Bolsa Balcão), accounting for most trading and market capitalization in the Brazilian stock market. It is a weighted measurement index.

== Overview ==
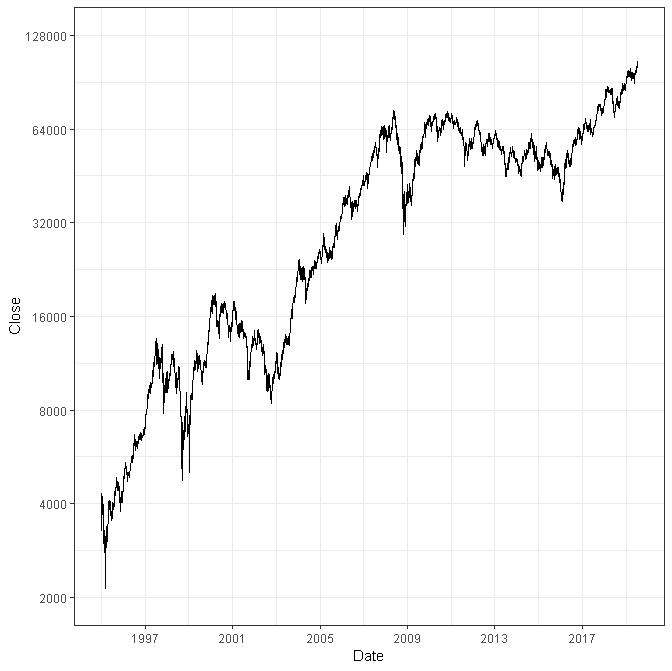
Bovespa Index 1994–2019

The index is a total return index composed by a theoretical portfolio as follows: Selection criteria: Being amongst the eligible stocks that account for 85% in descending order by individual tradability ratio (IN); Traded in 95% of the trading sessions; 0.1% of the value traded on the cash equity market (round lots); and must not be a penny stock. It is weighted by free float.

It is revised on a 4-month portfolio cycle in January, May, and September. On average, the components of Ibovespa represent 70% of all the stock value traded.

Its index number represents the present value of a portfolio begun on 2 January 1968, with a starting value of 100 and taking into account share price increases plus the reinvestment of all dividends, subscription rights that the constant's bonus stocks received.

== History and adjustments ==
Prior to 2014, the index was composed by a theoretical portfolio with the stocks that accounted for 80% of the volume traded in the last 12 months and that were traded at least on 80% of the trading days. It was revised quarterly, in order to keep its representativeness of the volume traded and in average the components of Ibovespa represented 70% of all the stock value traded. On 11 September 2013, BM&FBOVESPA announced the changes to the Ibovespa methodology, which would be implemented in a two-phased approach by May 2014.

The principal changes to the index methodology included:

1. Weighting function – previously a liquidity-driven weighting, starting from January 2014, weighting is now based on market value attributable to a constituent’s free float, with a liquidity cap (Tradability Ratio) set at twice the hypothetical weight of the constituent
2. The Tradability Ratio (Índice de Negociabilidade, or IN) is now calculated to take into account 1/3 of a component’s share of the overall number of trades and 2/3 of the component’s share of the overall value traded on the cash equity market;
3. The Tradability Ratio cut-off threshold for a stock to qualify for inclusion in the index has been raised from 80% to 85%
4. The 'active trading' requirement, as measured based on number of trading sessions, has been raised from 80% to 95%
5. In flotations of issuers listed over the course of the two previous portfolio cycles, the new stocks are now accepted for early index membership
6. Stocks that qualify as penny stocks are now ineligible for inclusion in the index
7. Stocks which at any rebalancing classify by individual Tradability Ratio over a certain period, collectively account for over ninety percent (90%) of the sum total of such metric, are now removed from the index
8. The criteria pursuant to which a constituent stock which is suspended from trading retains index membership or is removed from the index have been made clear
9. A limit was introduced in terms of the maximum relative weight of a company’s total contribution to the index.

== Adjustments ==
The index has been adjusted as follows, most of the adjustments occurred during the time Brazil experienced high rates of inflation during the 1980s and early 1990s:

1. division by 100, on 3 October 1983
2. division by 10, on 2 December 1985
3. division by 10, on 29 August 1988
4. division by 10, on 14 April 1989
5. division by 10, on 12 January 1990
6. division by 10, on 28 May 1991
7. division by 10, on 21 January 1992
8. division by 10, on 26 January 1993
9. division by 10, on 27 August 1993
10. division by 10, on 10 February 1994
11. division by 10, on 3 March 1997

== Record values ==
Type	Date	Value
Intraday (during the day) high	7 June 2021	131,190.30
Closing high	7 June 2021	130,776.27

== Annual returns ==
The following table shows the annual development of the Índice Bovespa since 1998.

Year	Closing level	Change in Index in Points	Change in Index in %
1998	6,784		
1999	17,092	10,308	151.95
2000	15,259	−1,833	−10.72
2001	13,578	−1,681	−11.02
2002	11,268	−2,310	−17.01
2003	22,236	10,968	97.34
2004	26,196	3,960	17.81
2005	33,456	7,260	27.71
2006	44,474	11,018	32.93
2007	63,886	19,412	43.65
2008	37,550	−26,336	−41.22
2009	68,588	31,038	82.66
2010	69,305	717	1.05
2011	56,754	−12,551	−18.11
2012	60,952	4,198	7.40
2013	51,507	−9,445	−15.50
2014	50,007	−1,500	−2.91
2015	43,350	−6,657	−13.31
2016	60,227	16,877	38.93
2017	76,402	16,175	26.86
2018	87,887	11,485	15.03
2019	115,645	27,758	31.58
2020	119,017	3,372	2.92
2021	104,822	−14,195	−11.93
2022	109,735	4,913	4.69
2023	134,185	24,450	22.28

For a list of the components of the index, check the article List of companies listed on Ibovespa.

== See also ==
- B3
- List of companies listed on Ibovespa
- Share Price of Índice Bovespa
