= B3 (stock exchange) =

Brazilian stock exchange and OTC market

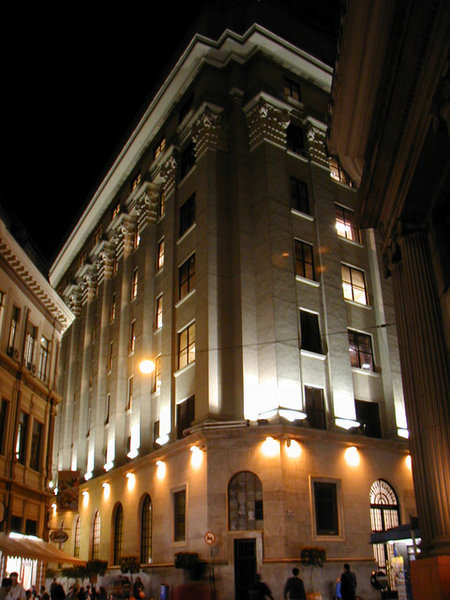
- Type: Stock exchange
- Location: São Paulo, Brazil
- Coordinates: 23°32′47″S 46°38′03″W
- Founded: August 23, 1890; 136 years ago
- Owner: B3 S.A. - Brasil, Bolsa, Balcão (B3: B3SA3)
- Key people: Gilson Finkelsztain (CEO); Antonio Carlos Quintella (chairman)
- Currency: Brazilian real
- No. of listings: 475 (October 2022)
- Market cap: US$$977.21 billion (February 2024)
- Indices: Ibovespa
- Website: b3.com.br/en_us

B3 S.A. – Brasil, Bolsa, Balcão (in English, B3 – Brazil Stock Exchange and Over-the-Counter Market), formerly BM&FBOVESPA, is a stock exchange located in São Paulo, Brazil, and the second oldest in the country.

Its current form can be traced back to May 8, 2008, when the São Paulo Stock Exchange (Bovespa) and the Brazilian Mercantile and Futures Exchange (BM&F) merged, creating BM&FBOVESPA. On March 30, 2017, BM&FBOVESPA merged with CETIP, creating B3. It also has offices in Rio de Janeiro, Shanghai, and London.

The benchmark indicator of B3 is the Índice Bovespa, more commonly known as Ibovespa. There were 475 companies traded at Bovespa as of October 2022. On June 7, 2021, the Ibovespa index reached its record market closing above 130,776 points.

== History ==
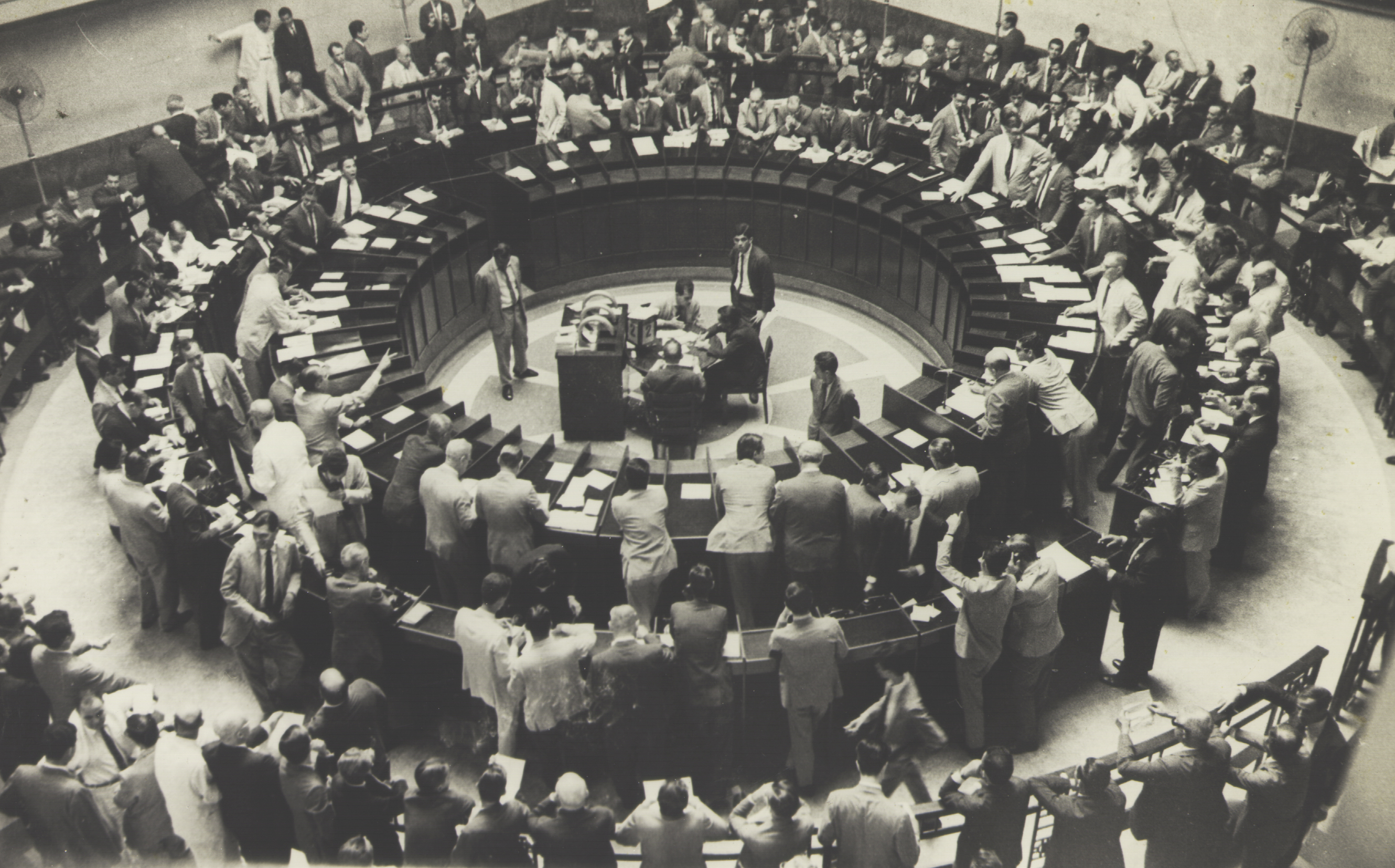
Stock exchange trading, mid-twentieth century

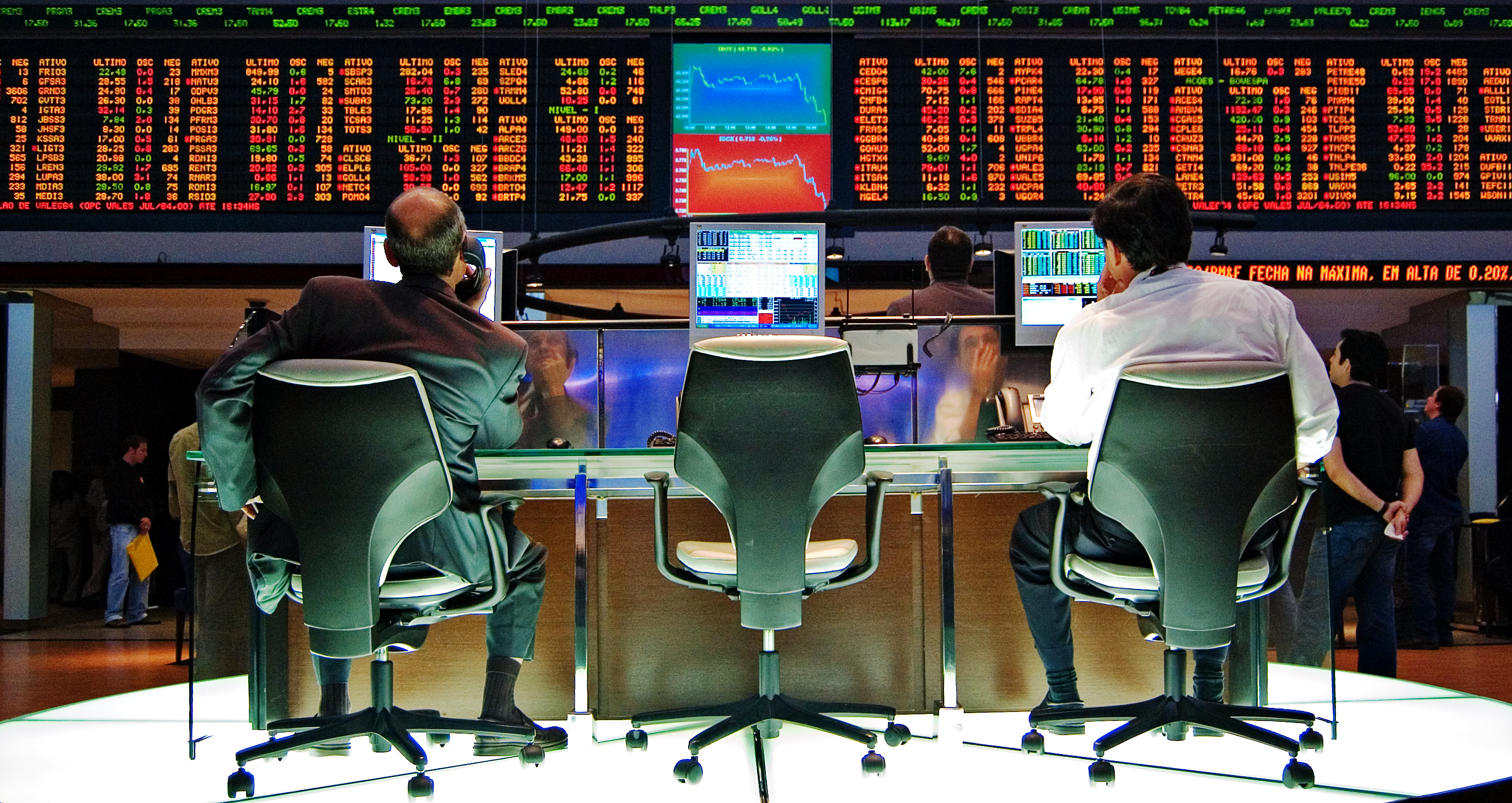
Trading panel

Founded on August 23, 1890, by Emilio Rangel Pestana, the "Bolsa de Valores de São Paulo" (São Paulo Stock Exchange, in English) has had a long history of services provided to the stock market and the Brazilian economy. Until the mid-1960s, Bovespa and the other Brazilian stock markets were state-owned companies, tied with the Secretary of Finances of the states they belonged to, and brokers were appointed by the government.

After the reforms of the national financial system and the stock market implemented in 1965/1966, Brazilian stock markets assumed a more institutional role. In 2007, the Exchange demutualized and became a for-profit company.

Through self-regulation, Bovespa operates under the supervision of the Comissão de Valores Mobiliários (CVM), analogous to the American SEC. Since the 1960s, it has constantly evolved with the help of technology such as the introduction of computer-based systems, mobile phones and the internet. In 1972, Bovespa was the first Brazilian stock market to implement an automated system for the dissemination of information online and in real-time, through an ample network of computer terminals.

At the end of the 1970s, Bovespa also introduced a telephone trading system in Brazil; the "Sistema Privado de Operações por Telefone" or "SPOT" (Private System of Telephone Trading, in English). At the same time, Bovespa developed a system of fungible safekeeping and online services for brokerage firms.

In 1990, the negotiations through the Sistema de Negociação Electrônica – CATS (Computer Assisted Trading System) was simultaneously operated with the traditional system of "Pregão Viva Voz" (open outcry). Currently, BM&FBOVESPA is a fully electronic exchange.

In 1997, a new system of electronic trading, known as the Mega Bolsa, was implemented successfully. The Mega Bolsa extends the potential volume of processing of information and allows the Exchange to increase its overall volume of activities.

With the goal to increase popular access to the stock markets, Bovespa introduced in 1999 the "Home Broker", an internet-based trading systems that allows individual investors to trade stocks. The system enables users to execute buy and sell orders online.

In 2000, Bovespa created three new listing segments, the Novo Mercado (New Market), Level 2 and Level 1 of Corporate Governance Standards, allowing companies to accede voluntarily to more demanding disclosure, governance and compliance obligations. The new listing segments mostly languished until 2004, when a growing number of newly public companies began to list on the Novo Mercado and other segments as part of a capital-raising effort. From 2004 to 2010, the vast majority of new listings on the Bovespa were made by Novo Mercado, Level 2 and Level 1 companies. The Novo Mercado, Level 2 and Level 1 segments are based on a contractual agreement of the listed company, its controlling shareholder, and its management to comply with specified regulations. In addition, listed companies must submit to arbitration as a method of resolving disputes. The set of protections entailed by a Novo Mercado listing is apparently deemed by market participants to increase the attractiveness of companies. The stock market index of Novo Mercado listed companies (the IGC) has consistently outperformed the broader Ibovespa index since its launch.

The recent success of the Brazilian equity capital markets is attributed to a significant extent to the credibility engendered by the Novo Mercado regulations. In 2007, only the United States and China equity markets had a greater number of initial public offerings. The availability of a "market exit" has also encouraged the development of a private equity industry, a growing Brazilian investment banking market and a thriving asset management industry. Another side benefit of a thriving equity market has been access to equity financing for the international expansion of Brazilian business. Brazilian multinational companies have used the proceeds of equity offerings to fund a growing number of international acquisitions. Vale, Embraer, Gerdau, Brazil Foods, Marfrig Alimentos and JBS have acquired businesses outside Brazil using the proceeds from equity offerings. Attractive valuations of Brazilian subsidiaries have led international companies to list their Brazilian subsidiaries, as was the case of Banco Santander Brasil.

On May 8, 2008, Bovespa Holding announced the merger of the São Paulo Stock Exchange (Bovespa) and the Brazilian Mercantile and Futures Exchange (BM&F), creating the world's second largest stock exchange.

As a result of an early 2008 stock swap, Chicago's CME Group owns a 5% stake in BM&FBovespa, and in turn, BM&FBovespa owns a 5% stake in CME Group. The agreement has also created an order routing trading system between both exchanges.

On June 18, 2012, BM&FBovespa became a founding member of the United Nations Sustainable Stock Exchanges initiative on the eve of the United Nations Conference on Sustainable Development (Rio+20).

On June 16, 2017, the Securities and Exchange Commission of Brazil has approved the change to the corporate name of BM&FBOVESPA S.A. – Bolsa de Valores, Mercadorias e Futuros to B3 S.A. – Brasil, Bolsa, Balcão, which must be used in all formal communications and references to the company.

The merger of Cetip S.A. – Mercados Organizados into B3 S.A. – Brasil, Bolsa, Balcão was approved both at the Extraordinary Shareholders Meeting held on June 14, 2017, and by CVM, and that the action shall occur on July 3, 2017.

== Hours ==
The exchange has a pre-market session from 09:45am to 10:00am, a normal trading session from 10:00am to 5:30pm and a post-market session from 6:00pm to 7:30pm weekdays and holidays declared by the Exchange in advance.

== Tickers and trade names ==
In the cash market, tickers are composed by four letters, a number, and a suffix in some cases. The letters stand for the listed company and the number disclosed the equity type, as follows:

Number	Class	Trade name indication
1	subscription right to common share	DO (direito a ordinária)
2	subscription right to preferred share	DP (direito a preferencial)
3	common share	ON (ordinária nominativa)
4	preferred share	PN (preferencial nominativa)
5	preferred share class A	PNA
6	preferred share class B	PNB
7	preferred share class C	PNC
8	preferred share class D	PND
9	subscription receipt to common share	ON REC
10	subscription receipt to preferred share	PN REC

11 and onward, codes may represent many situations, most commonly units (UNT, a certificate meshing different equities together. For instance, SULA11 is a unit comprising one common stock and two preferred stocks issued by Sul América S.A.), exchange-traded funds, real estate investment funds (known as FII, REIT in English) and Brazilian Depositary Receipts (BDRs). Nevertheless, they may state other conditions, as debenture subscription rights, special situations, and so on.

"Classified" preferred stocks (A, B, C, D and furthermore) do not have an implicit meaning, i.e., each issuer may attribute different rights and restrictions for a given class. This means it is mandatory to learn individually their characteristics as they are not directly comparable among companies.

The suffix B after the ticker means the equity is traded at the over-the-counter (OTC) market.

Here are some examples:

- VALE5 = Vale PNA shares
- CSNA3 = Companhia Siderúrgica Nacional common shares
- CTNM4 = Companhia de Tecidos Norte de Minas – Coteminas preferred shares
- ABCB2 = Banco ABC Brasil preferred shares subscription rights
- ETER9 = Eternit S.A. ordinary shares receipts
- SANB11 = Banco Santander Brasil units
- FAMB11B = Fundo de Investimento Imobiliário Ed. Almirante Barroso, OTC
- MILA11 = iShares MidLarge Cap ETF
- AVON11B = Avon Products, Inc. BDRs, OTC

Ex rights conditions are indicated in the equity trade name as a suffix composed by the letter E (for ex condition) and a letter or a combination of letters depending on the corporate actions involved:

Letter	Signification
D	Dividend (Dividendo)
J	Interest on own capital (Juros sobre capital próprio)
S	Subscription (Subscrição)
R	Income (Rendimento), for instance inflation adjustment for a dividend, yields from funds or a capital refund (Restituição de Capital)
B	Bonus stocks (Bonificação) or stock split (Desdobramento)
G	Reverse split (Grupamento)
C	Company split (Cisão)

Trade names may carry another symbols depending on their corporate governance. BM&FBOVESPA has four distinctive listing segments for companies that agree to undertake voluntary corporate rules on each segment:

Symbol	Signification
MA	BOVESPA Mais (Bovespa Plus). Over-the-counter market for companies who desire to gradually access the stock market
N1	Level 1 of Corporate Governance
N2	Level 2 of Corporate Governance. It appends more obligations to the companies, to those required for Level 1
NM	Novo Mercado (New Market). It is the topmost level of distinctive corporate governance practices

Equities' trade names are composed by the issuer's name, brand name or abbreviation (as it is limited to 12 characters), equity type, corporate governance level when pertinent and ex rights indication when appropriate.

Here are some examples (please note some equities listed here, such as subscription rights, do not exist anymore due to its own finite nature. The same apply to ex rights indication by the same reason):

Ticker	Company name	Class	Governance	Ex status	Description
BBAS3	BRASIL	ON	NM	EJ	Banco do Brasil common stock, New market listed, ex interest
FTRX4	FAB C RENAUX	PN			Fábrica de Tecidos Carlos Renaux preferred stock
JBDU10	J B DUARTE	PN REC			Indústrias J.B. Duarte preferred stocks subscription receipts
BEEF3	MINERVA	ON	NM		Minerva S.A. common stocks, new market listed
LATM11	LATAM AIRLN	DR3			LATAM Airlines BDR class 3
BISA1	BROOKFIELD	DO 3,06	NM		Brookfield Incorporações S.A. common stocks subscription rights to be exercised for BRL 3.06. New market listed company
TRPL4	TRAN PAULIST	PN	N1	EDJ	CTEEP – Compahia de Transmissão de Energia Elétrica Paulista, preferred share, Level 1 listed, ex dividends and interest

== Indices ==
BOVESPA calculates and discloses several indices:

=== Broad indices ===
- IBOVESPA: Total return index comprising the most representative companies in the market, both by market cap and traded volume. It is the benchmark index of São Paulo Stock Exchange. It is the oldest BOVESPA index, and it is being broadcast since 1968.
- IBRX 50: Also called Brasil 50, it comprises the 50 most traded equities at BOVESPA.
- IBRX: It has the same purpose of IBRX 50, but embracing the 100 most traded equities.
- IBRA: Brazil Broad-Based Index, it comprises a wider range of companies, aiming to embrace 99% of all companies already selected for any other exchange indices. Its main goal is to represent the most relevant companies in the stock exchange.
- MLCX: The Midlarge Cap Index shows the performance of the most relevant companies at the exchange, responding for at least 85% its total market value.
- SMLL: The Small Cap Index comprises relevant companies who don't apply for the MLCX listing, i.e., heavily traded companies which does not fill the 85% market share criteria.
- IVBX: It was conceived as an index to trail the 2nd tier companies, defined as those which trading ranking is from 11th and beneath, therefore not to be classified as blue chips. Nevertheless, most of its members are highly relevant companies, needing to comply with high traded volume and market capitalization.
- IDIV: The Dividend Yield index, it comprises companies which show the highest dividend yields values in the market, along with a strong trading session participation.

=== Sector indices ===
- IEE: Electric Power Index
- INDX: Industrial Index
- ICON: Consumption Index
- IMOB: Real estate Index
- IFNC: Financial Index (comprising banks, credit card processors, insurance companies, etc.)
- IMAT: Basic Materials Index (representing raw materials, pulp & paper, packaging, steel, etc.)
- UTIL: Public Utilities Index (electric power, water & sewage, gas, etc.)

=== Corporate governance indices ===
- IGC: Corporate Governance Index comprises all companies listed in any of the distinctive governance levels, irrespectively of its market cap.
- IGCT: Corporate Governance Trade index filters the IGC components by trading liquidity.
- IGNM: The New Market Index congregates all listed companies in the New Market portion of the BOVESPA.
- ITAG: The Tag Along Index is composed of equities that offer to his bearer privileged tag along rights compared to those granted by Brazilian law and a minimum trading volume.

=== Sustainability indices ===
- ICO2: Efficient Carbon Index is granted to companies who complies with efficient efforts to control greenhouse gas emissions and are eligible for IBRX 50.
- ISE: Corporate Sustaintability Index is comparable to the Dow Jones Sustainability Index, to join companies tied to environmental, social and accountability goals.

=== Other indices ===
- IFIX: Real State Investment Funds measure the listed REIT's return at BOVESPA. Unlike other indices, it can be composed of OTC equities.
- BDRX: Unsponsored Brazilian Depositary Receipt Index reflects the valuation of those equities which are not freely distributed at the stock exchange but limited to qualified investors, as defined by Brazilian regulations.

== See also ==
- Índice Bovespa (Bovespa Index)
- List of companies traded at Bovespa
- Economy of São Paulo
- CCP Global
- Americas Central Securities Depositories Association
