= Operation Weak Meat =

Brazilian police investigation

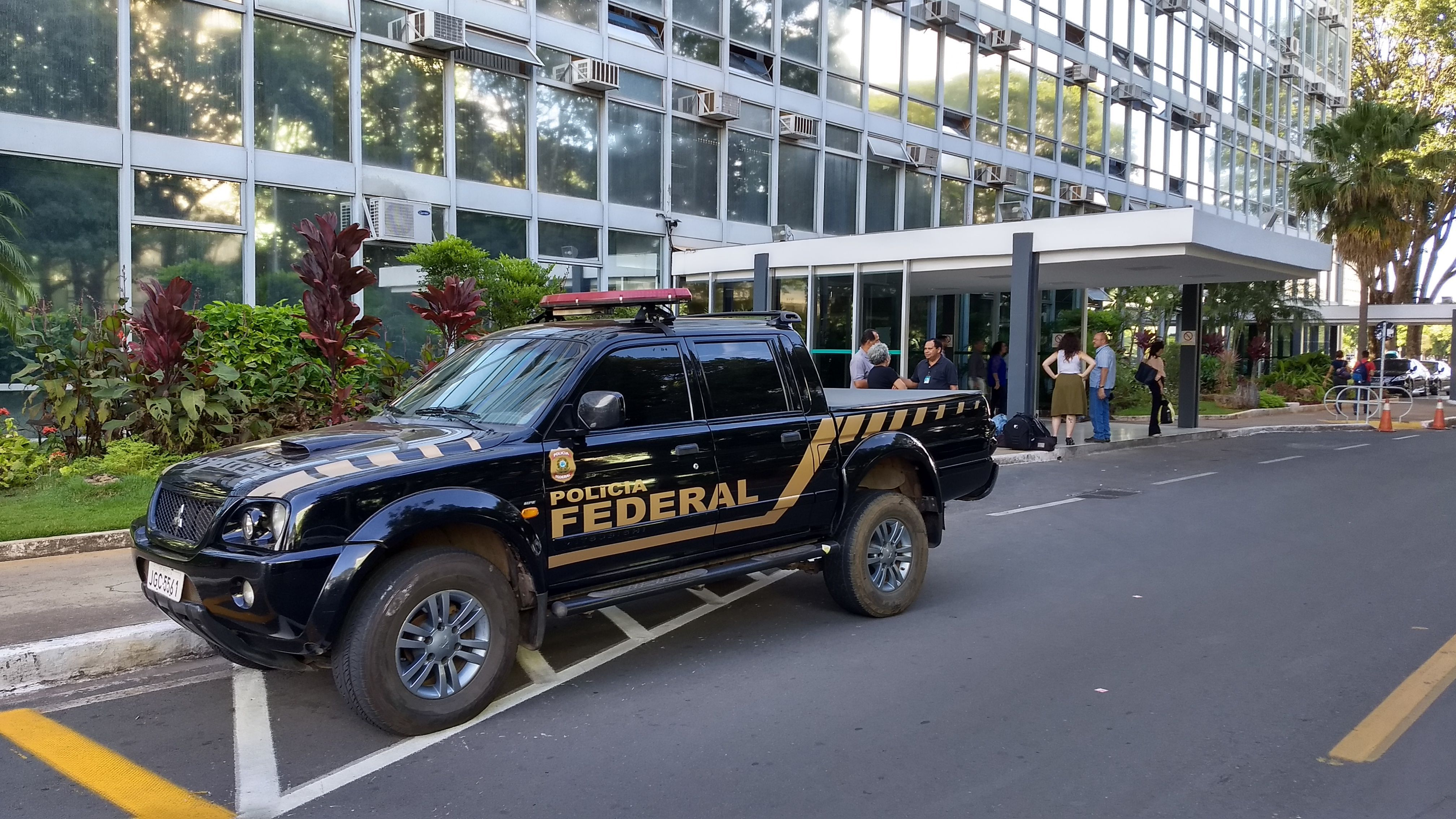
- Car of the Federal Police in front of the Ministry of Agriculture, in Brasília, during Operation Weak Meat.
- Court: Federal Judge Marcos Josegrei da Silva - 14th Federal Court of Federal Judiciary in Curitiba/PR
- Charge: Active corruption, Extortion, Embezzlement, Misfeasance, administrative advocacy, falsification and adulteration of food substances or products, Money laundering

The Operation Carne Fraca (Operation Weak Meat in Brazilian media in English) is an operation started on March 17, 2017, and enforced by the Federal Police of Brazil, that country's federal police force, which investigated some of the country's largest meat processing companies. The name is a pun between the operation's concern with meat and the Bible verse about "weak flesh" (Matthew 26:41) – as a result, it is sometimes translated "Operation Weak Flesh".

It is an operation launched by the Federal Police of Brazil, which began on March 17, 2017. It investigates the largest companies in the industry — JBS, owner of the brands Seara, Swift, Friboi and Vigor, and BRF, owner of Sadia and Perdigão — accused of adulterating the meat they sold in domestic and international markets. The scandal of adulterated meat in Brazil involves more than thirty food companies in the country, accused of selling spoiled meat, changing expiration dates, altering appearance, and using chemical products to seek the resale of spoiled meat and to point out government agents accused of allowing the sale of such meat.

The company JBS S.A. (which represents about a quarter of world's market on beef, and holds the trademarks Friboi, Seara Alimentos (Seara Foods), Swift Armour, and Vigor) and the BRF company (which holds the trademarks Perdigão and Sadia) are accused of having mixed rotten meat treated with chemical components into meat sold in Brazil and abroad.

Recordings registered the interference of the then Minister of Justice of the Michel Temer government, Osmar Serraglio, demanding from one of the scheme's leaders and main target of the investigation, Daniel Gonçalves Filho, information about the inspection at one of the involved meatpacking plants.

== Economic context ==
Brazil is the world's largest exporter of beef and poultry and the fourth-largest exporter of pork. In 2016, the country's meat industry accounted for approximately 7.2% of global trade in the sector.

At the time, BRF—the holding company that controlled the Sadia and Perdigão brands—operated 47 production facilities in Brazil and held an estimated 14% share of the global poultry market, exporting to 120 countries. JBS, then the world's largest meat processor, marketed products under brands including Friboi, Seara, Swift and Pilgrim's Pride, and exported to approximately 150 countries.

Following the launch of the operation, the shares of both companies recorded some of the steepest declines on the Ibovespa index, with BRF falling 7.25% and JBS declining 10.59%. Both firms had already reported weak financial results in 2016, and market analysts assessed that restoring investor and consumer confidence would present a significant challenge.

== Operation Weak Meat ==
Phase 1 – March 17, 2017. The Federal Police conducted Operation Weak Meat, described as the largest operation in the history of the corporation. Over 1,100 federal police officers took to the streets to carry out 309 judicial orders in six states of Brazil and the Federal District. The court orders issued included 27 for preventive custody, 11 for temporary custody, 77 for coercive detention, and 194 for search and seizure.

According to the investigations, more than 30 companies and officials from the Ministry of Agriculture benefited from the scheme involving the sale of unsuitable meat for consumption. The Federal Police stated that part of the bribes released in the scheme went to the PMDB, the party of the acting president Michel Temer, and to the PP, a member of the ruling coalition. Federal Police delegate Maurício Moscardi reminded that both entrepreneurs and public officials bear responsibility for the criminal acts against the population. Within the Ministry of Agriculture, employees involved in the scheme transferred inspectors to ensure the continuity of the scheme. The refusal of an inspector to be transferred was what triggered the start of the investigations. After the operation was launched by the Federal Police, 33 officials were suspended, and of these, four were dismissed. Three meat processing units were closed: the BRF plant in Mineiros (GO) and the Peccin plants in Jaraguá do Sul (SC) and Curitiba (PR).

Phase 2 (Antidote) – On May 31, 2017, the Federal Police carried out the second phase of the operation, executing three search and seizure warrants and one indefinite preventive custody warrant in Goiás. The main target of this phase was Francisco Carlos de Assis, former regional superintendent of the Ministry of Agriculture, Livestock and Food Supply (MAPA) in the state of Goiás. He was caught on phone intercepts discussing the destruction of evidence relevant to the investigation of Operation Weak Meat.

Phase 3 (Cheating) – On March 5, 2018, the Federal Police launched the third phase of the operation, targeting a fraud scheme uncovered in the company BRF. The former president of the company, Pedro de Andrade Faria, was one of the ten individuals arrested by the agents. Ninety-one court orders were executed by the Federal Court in Paraná, including 11 temporary custody, 27 coercive detention, and 53 search and seizure warrants at BRF units. According to the Federal Police, the individuals under investigation may face charges such as document forgery, qualified embezzlement, and formation of a criminal organization, in addition to crimes against public health. These investigations were based on the findings of the first and second phases, which targeted dozens of meatpacking plants. It was found that five laboratories and the company’s internal analysis departments falsified testing results.

== Reactions ==
=== National ===
Authorities warned about the impact that the scandal could have on the national agribusiness sector and its potential economic consequences.

The shares of JBS on the BM&FBovespa closed the day of March 17 with a decrease of over 11%, while BRF followed with a nearly 8% decline. On that day alone, JBS experienced a market value loss of R$3.456 billion, while BRF's loss amounted to R$2.31 billion.

Seara and Friboi brands suffered from a change of public perspective. Tony Ramos, Ana Maria Braga and Fátima Bernardes stopped advertizing for JBS. The company also stopped publicizing "carne confiável tem nome" advertisements and changed Friboi label to "Do Chef".

=== International ===
The New York Times stated that the scandal "raises doubts about the agribusiness industry in Brazil, in the already affected national economy, due to other scandals," while also mentioning the connection between the bribes originated in the scheme and the party of the President of Brazil.

The British newspaper Financial Times echoed the same sentiment as the New York Times and also raised questions about the future of the meat industry in Brazil.

The British newspaper The Daily Telegraph mentioned the corruption allegations to keep spoiled meat on the market and its connection to federal government officials, a fact also highlighted by the American newspaper The Washington Post.

According to Minister Blairo Maggi, the European Union requested an emergency meeting with the Brazilian government to seek clarifications about the police operation and the investigations into the fraud.

=== Government ===
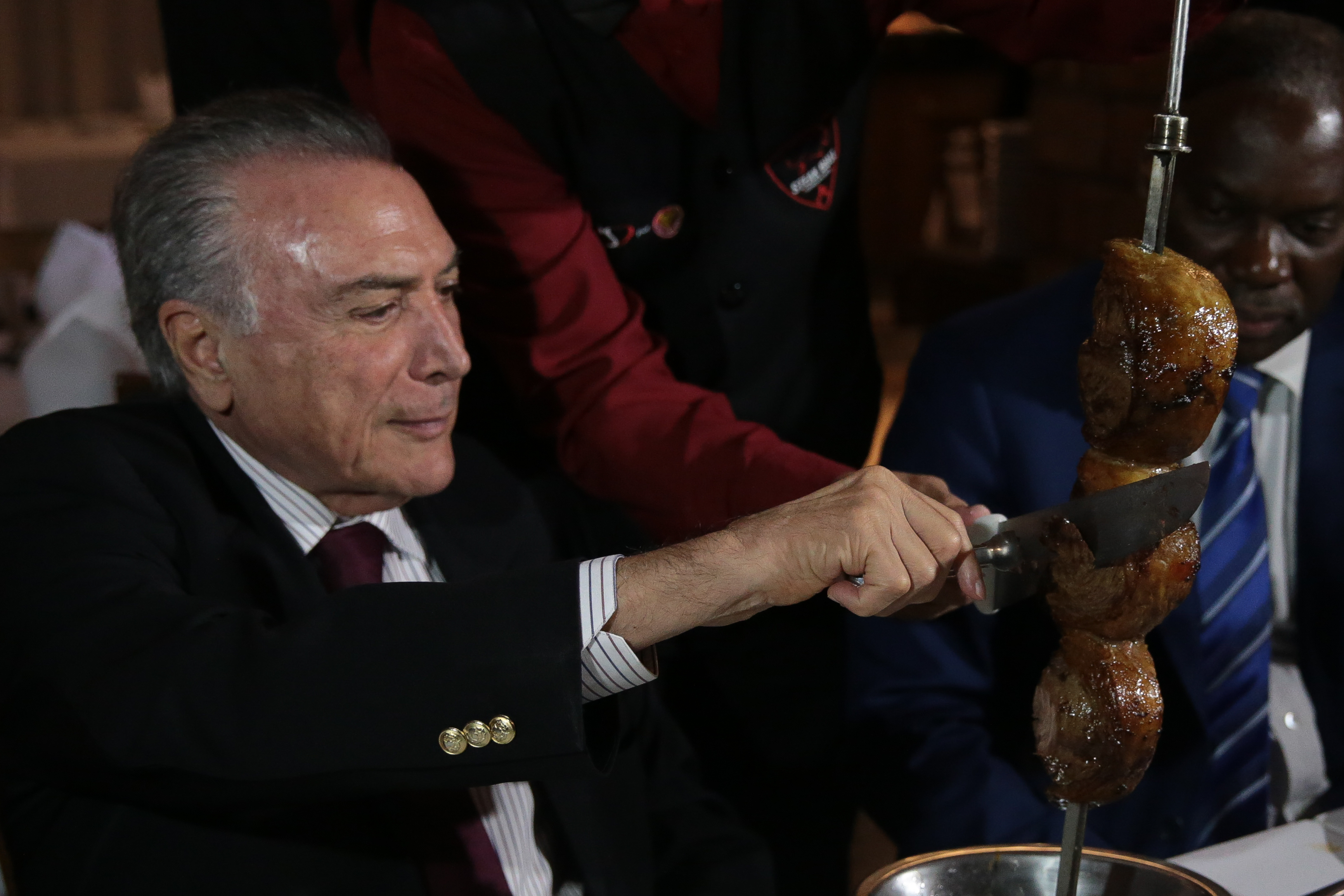
On March 19, 2017, President Michel Temer dined at a steakhouse with ministers and ambassadors in an attempt to mitigate the effects of Operation Carne Fraca.

The minister of Agriculture, Livestock, and Supply, Blairo Maggi, from the Progressive Party, stated on March 18 in Cuiabá that some employees deviated from their duties and asserted that he will not stop consuming and recommends the consumption of Brazilian meat, stating that there is no risk at all.

The Manager of International and Government Relations at BRF, Roney Nogueira dos Santos, was arrested by the Federal Police on March 18 at Guarulhos International Airport after arriving from abroad.

On March 19, President Michel Temer, after a meeting with ambassadors, announced a task force to investigate the targets of Carne Fraca.

== Political donations ==
The main companies investigated and targeted in Operation Carne Fraca donated 393 million reais to politicians in the 2014 general elections. The biggest beneficiary was the PT with 60.7 million reais. The PMDB came in second place with 59.1 million reais, followed by PSDB with 58.1 million reais. The PP and PR received 38.1 million and 24.4 million reais, respectively.

Among the candidates, politicians affiliated with PT were the ones who received the most, totaling 60.6 million, while politicians from PMDB received 6.9 million, from PSDB 3.3 million reais, from PSD 3.1 million reais, and from PROS 1.6 million reais.

== Course ==
In July 2017, Eumar Roberto Novacki, Brazil's secretary of state, in Geneva tried to convince European meat importers that Brazilian meat was of high quality. At the same time, new information on bribery of meat inspectors were published.

== See also ==
- JBS CPI
- List of food companies
- List of scandals in Brazil
- Operation Car Wash
- Joesley Batista
