= JBS Foods International =

International subsidiary of JBS

JBS Foods International B.V.
- Traded as: NYSE: JBS (intended)
- Industry: Food processing
- Founded: 2016; 10 years ago
- Headquarters: Amstelveen, Netherlands
- Number of locations: Amstelveen; New York City; São Paulo
- Area served: Worldwide
- Key people: Joesley Batista, Wesley Batista, Gilberto Tomazoni
- Products: Food and beverages
- Parent: JBS S.A.
- Website: jbsfoodsgroup.com

JBS Foods International (JBSFI) engages in the food business internationally, and is the largest meatpacking company in the world. It is a "controlled company" in SEC parlance. JBSFI operates through four segments: Beef, Pork, Poultry, and Other. It offers fresh and processed beef, lamb, sheep, pork, and chicken. JBSFI is the largest leather processor in the world. It also processes collagen, biodiesel, hygiene and cleaning products, and is involved in metal packaging, carriers, waste management, casings, and trading activities, as well as provides prepared food products.

== Prior regulatory filings ==
On 5 August 2016 it was intended to be registered in the Republic of Ireland as JBS Foods International Designated Activity Company, for its SEC IPO filing to permit it to be traded on the American NYSE market. It was also intended to trade on the São Paulo Stock Exchange under a Brazilian Depositary Receipt program it was to operate. In August 2016, JBS Foods International said that it intended to be a tax resident in Britain, and that for its IPO it intended to pursue a six-step process.

On 16 November 2016, the DAC withdrew its IPO paperwork with the SEC.

It substituted for its IPO on 6 December 2016 a Dutch operation called JBS Foods International B.V.

== Planned IPO and investigations ==
In December 2016, JBS S.A. announced a re-organization plan, part of which involved planning an initial public offer in the United States for its international operations. The intended IPO is expected to be performed through the vehicle company JBS Foods International, because JBS S.A., J&F Investimentos and other companies of the group are involved in 6 different operations from the Brazilian Federal Police, including Operation Car Wash, Bullish, Greenfield, Carne Fraca and Cui Bono.

JBS S.A.'s main shareholders, Joesley Batista and Wesley Batista collaborated with the Brazilian police as whistle-blowers for Operation Car Wash, where they confessed to over 12 years of crimes, including bribery, active corruption, insider trading, and many other, which helped the JBS group to grow above the market after a series of acquisitions in part funded by loans from banks controlled by the state of Brazil.

Despite the active corruption scandals performed by the Batista brothers, Joesley Batista made it clear that the IPO was not going to be canceled.

After the testimonies provided by the Bastista brothers, on May 19, 2017 Brazil's securities regulator launched four new probes against meatpacker JBS S.A. and other companies controlled by J&F Investimentos to investigate suspicious trades made before markets were rattled by the revelation of a plea deal by the company's top executives.

On 23 April, 2025, JBS got approval from the SEC for a listing on the NY Stock Exchange, after its subsidiary made a $5 million donation to the committee for the second inauguration of Donald Trump.

== Cyber attack ==
In late May 2021 JBS closed down some of its operations in the US, Canada and Australia due to a ransomware cyber attack thought to have been perpetrated by REvil, also known as Sodinokibi, a Russian cyber criminal group. On 2 June 2021, JBS returned to normal production.

== See also ==
- JBS USA
