= JBS N.V. =

Brazilian meat processing company

- Logo used since 2023
- Trade name: JBS
- Type: Public
- Traded as: B3: JBSS32; Ibovespa Component; NYSE: JBS
- ISIN: NL0015002J37
- Industry: Food processing
- Founded: 1953; 73 years ago
- Founder: José Batista Sobrinho
- Headquarters: São Paulo, Brazil; Amsterdam, Netherlands
- Area served: Worldwide
- Key people: Gilberto Tomazoni (CEO); Jeremiah O‘Callaghan (chairman)
- Products: Foods and beverages
- Revenue: ▲US$ 86.2 billion (2025)
- Net income: ▲US$ 2.2 billion (2025)
- Total assets: ▲US$ 45.2 billion (2025)
- Total equity: ▲US$ 9.5 billion (2025)
- Number of employees: 280,000 (2025)
- Parent: J&F Investimentos
- Subsidiaries: JBS USA; Seara; JBS Foods International; BioTech Foods
- Website: jbsglobal.com jbsfoodsgroup.com

JBS N.V. is a Brazilian multinational company that is the largest meat processing enterprise in the world, producing factory processed beef, chicken, salmon, sheep, pork, and also selling by-products from the processing of these meats. It is headquartered in São Paulo and Amsterdam. It was founded in 1953 in Anápolis, Goiás.

As of 2025, JBS have over 250 production facilities around the world and its products reach consumers in 180 countries. J&F Investimentos is a 42% indirect shareholder in JBS S.A., which is listed on American stock markets as JBS. J&F Investimentos is wholly owned by Joesley Batista and Wesley Batista. The company has been regularly criticized on various grounds, including allegations of labor law violations and environmental factors such as for sourcing meat from farms that purportedly contribute to the destruction of the Amazon rainforest.

Former logo used until 2023.

== History ==
=== 1953–2000: Formation in Brazil ===
JBS was founded in 1953 by José Batista Sobrinho, a rancher from Anápolis, as a small slaughterhouse business. The company's name is derived from the initials of its founder. Its early growth was driven in part by the construction of Brasília, which created a significant new market within reach of Sobrinho's operations.

During the late 1960s, the company expanded by acquiring and operating additional slaughterhouses. In the 1980s, JBS accelerated its domestic growth through the acquisition of other Brazilian meat-processing companies, laying the foundation for its subsequent international expansion. Over the following decades, a series of acquisitions in Brazil and abroad transformed JBS into the world's largest beef producer.

JBS became a publicly traded company in 2007. That same year, it received a major investment from the Brazilian Development Bank (BNDES), providing additional capital to support its expansion strategy.

=== 2007–2010: US acquisitions ===
In 2007, JBS went through with a US$225m acquisition of U.S. firm Swift & Company, which was the third largest U.S. beef and pork processor, renamed as JBS USA. It leads the world in slaughter capacity, at 51.4 thousand head per day, and continues to focus on production operations, processing, and export plants, nationally and internationally. With the new acquisition, JBS entered the pork market, to end the year as the third largest producer and processor of this type of meat in the United States.

On 31 August 2010 it was announced that the company had acquired 64% of Pilgrim's Pride for a bid of US$800 million, establishing JBS's position in the chicken production industry.

=== 2010: South American operations ===
On September 16, 2009, JBS announced that it had acquired the food operation of Grupo Bertin, one of three Brazilian market leaders, consolidating its position as the largest beef producer in the world. The banks JP Morgan Chase and Santander Brasil assisted in the transaction.

In August 2010, it was reported that JBS was considering the sale of some of the eight slaughterhouses it owned in Argentina because of "scarce livestock and export restrictions". Between 2007 and 2010, JBS received around $2.5 billion in investments from BNDES.

=== 2011-2016: Expansion, CanaMex acquisitions ===
As of 2011, JBS had been trying to bid to gain control of Sara Lee Corporation's meat business. JBS had shown interest in the meats business but struggled to push forward with a bid for the entire company.

On 9 January 2013, JBS USA acquired the Canadian operations of XL Foods, chiefly the XL Lakeside beef processing plant in Brooks, Alberta which had at the time the capacity to process 4,000 head of cattle per day.

On May 27, 2014, Pilgrim's Pride Corporation, 75% owned by JBS S.A., made an unsolicited $5.6 billion bid for Hillshire Brands Co. (HSH).

On July 28, 2014, Tyson Foods, Inc. announced its intention to sell Tyson de México and Tyson do Brasil, its Mexican and Brazilian poultry subsidiaries, to JBS S.A. for $575 million in cash by the end of 2014, pending regulatory approval.

In 2015, JBS bought the US pork business of Cargill Inc. for $1.45 billion.

Also in 2015, JBS S.A. created a board of compliance directors in Brazil.

=== 2016: IPO of US unit ===
In December 2016, JBS announced a re-organization plan, which involved an initial public offering (IPO) in the United States for its international operations, through JBS Foods International. At the time, it had units on five continents.

=== 2017: Brazilian food market drop ===
According to industry estimates, as of 2017, JBS USA was the second-largest processor of beef and pork in the United States, while JBS-owned Pilgrim's was the second-largest poultry company.

By February 2017, JBS had been accused of wrongdoing in a wider investigation into compliance issues in Brazil, although it planned to increase its board of compliance directors from three people to eight. At the time, the company's controlling shareholder J&F Investimentos SA was being investigated "in relation to fraud at state-run companies’ employee pension funds". The investigation looked into whether JBS possibly benefited from the scheme, including JBS chairman Joesley Batista, who denied wrongdoing. By March 2017, JBS SA remained the world's largest supplier of animal protein, after a series of acquisitions in part funded by loans from banks controlled by the Brazilian government. Global operations included brands Seara, Swift, and Moy Park. In March 2017, JBS was accused by Brazil's environmental regulator of buying cattle raised on illegally deforested Amazon land, with JBS denying wrongdoing.

On March 17, 2017, it was announced that Brazil was investigating its meat-packing industry for "allegedly bribing food-sanitation inspectors", with JBS SA among the dozens of firms targeted, in particular a single employee. JBS shares dropped 10 percent with the announcement. JBS denied any wrongdoing and said it had taken “applicable measures” against the one employee included in the investigation, due to his alleged relationships with government inspectors. The announcement of the police allegations led to various nations considering banning Brazilian beef imports. China, 20 other countries, and the European Union subsequently issued temporary bans on Brazilian meat shipments, or increased scrutiny. On March 23, 2017, JBS SA said it had slashed beef production, halting beef production in 33 of its 36 plants for three days, with a plan to cut production by 35% of capacity at all its units. JBS stated the "measures aim at adjusting production until there is a decision about the embargoes imposed by importers." The company also spent more on advertising. After initial trade disruptions, Brazilian meat companies regained access to most international markets.

=== 2017: BNDES and bribery investigations ===
On May 12, 2017, authorities announced that they were investigating whether JBS SA had received illegal financing advantages from state-owned bank BNDES. Dubbed "Operation Bullish", police stated that these had led to a loss of around $385 million in public funds. JBS said the financing was lawful, and BNDES said it was cooperating with authorities. Executives including CEO Wesley Batista and chairman Joesley Batista were questioned by federal police. The court forbade the Batistas from restructuring the business during the investigation. On May 16, 2017, JBS said it might delay its planned IPO due to legal troubles. The CEO made it clear, however, that the IPO was not canceled.

On May 17, O Globo reported that it had obtained a recording of Michel Temer encouraging JBS chairman Joesley Batista to "bribe a jailed former legislator to buy the lawmaker’s silence." The news resulted in protests and calls for Temer's resignation, and the Brazilian stock market dropped. Temer denied wrongdoing. On May 17, 2017 O Globo reported that Joesley Batista, through J&F Investimentos, allegedly paid bribes to three presidents. Documentation of the payments was released by the Supreme Court on May 19. On May 19, 2017, Joesley Batista admitted to paying bribes to Michel Temer, Dilma Rousseff and Luiz Inácio Lula da Silva, over the previous 14 years. Joesley Batista told prosecutors J&F Investimentos had paid a total of $123 million in bribes to Brazilian politicians in recent years. All three presidents denied accepting bribes. Temer alleged Batista had doctored evidence, including a recording of Temer talking to Batista, to make money from the scandal through insider trading. Batista denied illegal share purchases. As of May 22, the Comissão de Valores Mobiliários (CVM) was demanding $3.4 billion from J&F Investimentos as part of a promised plea deal, according to the press. The former head of CVM referred to testimony that asserted J&F Investimentos had bribed 1,829 politicians. In May 2017 JBS retained law firm Baker McKenzie to negotiate possible criminal charges with the United States Department of Justice under the Foreign Corrupt Practices Act.

Reports May 31, 2017, said J&F Investimentos had agreed to pay US$3.2 billion in fines, for leniency from the Brazilian government "over 25 years after admitting to giving roughly $150 million—mostly in bribes—to Brazilian politicians." JBS shares afterwards rose 9% on São Paulo's stock exchange. In exchange for their cooperation, the chairman and his older brother avoided jail time. All three former presidents continued to deny accepting bribes from Joesley Batista.

=== 2017: Recruitment of safety director, Mexican divestment ===
In early August 2017, JBS hired Alfred Almanza as its global head of food safety. Almanza had previously been the head of food safety at the U.S. Department of Agriculture.

On August 3, 2017, it was reported that JBS was selling its stake in its Mexican unit of Vigor Alimentos to Grupo Lala.

=== 2018: United States Department of Agriculture bailout ===
JBS, a Brazilian-owned company, received $22.3 million from the USDA farm bailout package of 2018.

=== COVID-19 pandemic ===
At least 277 JBS USA workers at a plant in Greeley, Colorado, were presumed to be infected with coronavirus disease 2019 in April 2020, leading to the closure of this large meat processing operation with over 3,000 employees; the plant reopened after a 9-day closure. The Weld County, Colorado Department of Public Health, where Greeley is located, reported that employees had said that the JBS plant had a "work while sick" culture. The company denied any such pressure on workers. By April 15, 102 workers had tested positive for the coronavirus, and four had died. Outbreaks of COVID-19 have also been found in five other JBS beef processing plants, in Souderton, Pennsylvania; Plainwell, Michigan; Green Bay, Wisconsin; Cactus, Texas; and Grand Island, Nebraska.

With 600 workers confirmed and probable cases in the JBS Foods plant in Brooks, Alberta, 7% of the population tested positive for COVID-19. As of May 9, 510 workers had recovered, but one worker died. On 22 April it came to light that even though the plant had added a shift premium of $4 an hour, many employees skipped their shifts forcing the company to reduce their schedule to one shift. As of April 21, the company claimed that there had been no walk-offs.

=== Cyberattack ===
JBS was targeted by a cyberattack in late May 2021, which forced the company to temporarily shut down slaughterhouses in Australia, Canada and the United States. The company stood down 7,000 workers across Australian operations and up to 3,000 workers in Canada and the United States. In June 2021, JBS paid $11 million in ransom, using Bitcoin, to put an end to the cyberattack. Chief executive Andre Nogueira said: "This was a very difficult decision to make for our company and for me personally".

=== Cultured meat ===
In 2021, JBS invested US$100 million in cultured meat through BioTech Foods, with plans to release to the market by 2024.

== Segments ==
JBS operates in the segments of beef, pork, poultry, fish, and sheep, as well as leather, collagen, metal packaging, biodiesel, fertilizers, hygiene and beauty, and transportation.

=== Animal and plant protein ===
- Anglo
- Bordon
- Excelsior
- Frangosul
- Friboi
- Swift
- LeBon
- Marca Target
- Maturatta Friboi
- Moy Park
- Angus Friboi
- Reserva Friboi
- Do Chef! Friboi
- Seara Alimentos
- Apeti
- Bertin
- Organic Beef
- Cabaña las Lilas
- Tama
- Sola
- Hereford
- Big Frango
- marba
- OZO
- Denny
- Incrível!
- Pilgrim's Pride
- Vivera (including The Vegetarian Butcher)
- Richmond
- Just BARE
- Primo Smallgoods
- Kitut
- Carioca
- Fluminense
- LeBon
- Gradina
- Confiança
- Nhô Bento
- Eder
- Confiança
- Buona Itália
- Rezende
- Swift Black
- Frigor Hans
- La Herencia
- AdapTable Meals
- Gold’n Plump
- Great Southern
- O’Kane
- Gold’n Plump
- 5 Star
- Huon Aquaculture
- Andrews Meat
- 1855
- 1953

=== Dairy ===
- Doriana
- Delícia
- Franciscano
- Mesa
- Delicata
- Aspen Ridge
- Plum Rose
- Primor
- Rezende
- Ricca
- Gradina
- Salada
- Cremosy
- Cukin
- Rigamonti

=== Cosmetics and cleaning ===
- JBS Higiene & Limpeza (produces soaps and detergents)
- BioBriz
- avarte
- Minuano Flora

=== Others ===
- Anglo (vegetables)
- Funpet (animal feed)
- JBS Biodiesel (biodiesel production)
- JBS Couros (leather)
- Zempack (production of steel cans and steel and aluminum aerosols)
- JBS Transportadora (transportation of live animals, containers, dry and refrigerated goods, as well as leather)
- Uboi (focused on transportation of animals for livestock farmers of all sizes)
- JBS-Swift Foods Company
- NovaProm (produces and exports bovine collagen to more than 40 countries)
- JBS Natural Casings (produces natural bovine casings)
- NoCarbon (specialized in leasing electric trucks, involved in distribution of JBS and retail products)
- JBS Trading (trades raw materials in the food, hygiene and cleaning, fuel, pharmaceutical, and cellulose sectors)
- TRP (acquires new vehicles for JBS companies and sells used trucks and trailers)
- Orygina (produces inputs for the pharmaceutical industry, offers research centers, molecular development, genetic therapies and vaccines, and exports culture media)
- Campo Forte Fertilizantes (produces fertilizers from organic waste generated in its factories)
- Genu-in (production of collagen peptides and gelatin for the nutraceutical market)
- MassaLeve (company in the fresh pasta segment)

== Plants and subsidiaries ==
JBS's production structure is embedded in consumer markets worldwide, with plants installed in several of the world's leading beef producing nations (Brazil, United States, and Australia), serving 110 countries through exports.

== Controversies ==
=== Donations to electoral campaigns ===
It is one of the main donors of resources for electoral campaigns in Brazil.

- 2002 - R$200,000;
- 2006 - R$19.7 million;
- 2010 - R$83 million;

=== Roberto Carlos lawsuit ===
In November 2014, singer Roberto Carlos, who was a spokesperson for one of the group's brands, Friboi, filed a lawsuit against the company due to a contract termination, JBS terminated the contract with the singer due to low commercial performance, as the company expected a much higher commercial return due to Carlos' image, but the strategy did not work out. The singer is seeking a compensation of R$7.2 million in court, but JBS claims to only be obligated to pay R$3.2 million, The advertising contract between JBS and Carlos was initiated in February 2014 and has a total value of about R$45 million, The case still needs to be judged in the 38th Civil Court of São Paulo, as of November 2014.

=== Labor lawsuits ===
In June 2014, JBS was sentenced in the second instance by the Regional Labor Court of the 23rd Region, in Mato Grosso, in two different cases opened by the Ministry of Labor (MPT) based on systematic violations of labor laws. One of the sentences refers to the contamination of the meat served to employees with larvae. The other is due to the company's negligence regarding the health of its workers by failing to take basic monitoring and safety measures regarding the refrigeration reservoir using ammonia gas. In this case, Judge Juliano Girardello highlights that "inspectors detected a strong smell of this chemical product in the engine room."

=== Political participation ===
JBS was one of the largest donors of resources to the electoral campaign of the general elections in Brazil in 2014, with a total amount of R$391.8 million declared to the Superior Electoral Court. The company donated resources to the campaigns of at least 16 political parties. Among the politicians who received these resources were the former president Dilma Rousseff, 12 senators, 18 governors, and 190 federal deputies.

In January 2025, JBS subsidiary Pilgrim's Pride gave $5 million to the second inauguration of Donald Trump, making it the largest single contributor to the inauguration fund. In May 2025, the Securities and Exchange Commission approved the listing of JBS S.A. on the New York Stock Exchange. After the approval, Senator Elizabeth Warren authored a letter to executives at JBS USA and Pilgrim's Pride expressing concern that the contribution may have been intended to influence the Trump administration's regulatory decisions.

=== Purchase of U.S. dollars ===
On May 17, 2017, JBS purchased a large quantity of U.S. dollars in the market a few hours before the disclosure of the scandal that caused the currency to skyrocket and led the BM&FBOVESPA to suspend trading after a 10% drop. The information about the company's operation had a negative impact on the financial market and society. In the operation, JBS made a profit of R$170 million. The Securities and Exchange Commission (CVM) will investigate the case. The profit from the operation was more than enough for JBS to pay the multimillion-dollar fine to escape the Greenfield and Lava Jato Operations, in which it is being investigated.

=== Financial aid from the United States ===
In 2019, the Trump administration allocated US$62.4 million to subsidiary JBS USA from a fund to intended help U.S. farmers affected by the trade war with China. The U.S. Department of Agriculture announced a contract in the same year to purchase US$22.3 million worth of pork from the company. Secretary of Agriculture Sonny Perdue and Attorney General Jeff Sessions requested the U.S. Department of Justice to investigate a possible case of corruption. There were also indications that JBS benefited from trade tensions with increased sales in China. JBS stated that despite being a foreign company, it supports American farmers by creating job opportunities. In May 2019, Representative Rosa DeLauro from Connecticut claimed that President Donald Trump was unaware of the situation.

== Corruption allegations ==
=== Operation Weak Meat ===
On March 17, 2017, some JBS company meatpacking plants were targeted for investigation during Operation Weak Meat conducted by the Federal Police (PF). At the time, the PF arrested 36 individuals suspected of involvement in a fraud scheme in the production and commercialization of meat, which involved the corruption of inspectors from the Ministry of Agriculture, Livestock, and Supply, as well as producers. The investigation uncovered evidence of product adulteration and the sale of expired and spoiled meat. A total of 21 factories were investigated. As a result of the operation, JBS suffered a loss of 15.35% in its market value, which at the time was R$32.6 billion, and it ended up being valued at R$27.6 billion, according to the financial information company Economatica. Despite this, the Brazilian meat market continued to thrive.

=== Operation Bullish ===
On May 12, 2017, the Federal Police (PF) launched Operation Bullish, which investigated fraud in the loans granted by the National Bank for Economic and Social Development (BNDES) through its subsidiary BNDESPAR to JBS. The loans were allegedly granted after the hiring of a consulting company linked to former congressman Antonio Palocci. The targets of the warrants included Luciano Coutinho, who chaired the development bank from 2007 to 2016, and the Batista brothers, Joesley and Wesley, who are in charge of the group's companies. The loans, amounting to R$8.1 billion, were used for the acquisition of other companies in the meatpacking industry. The PF found evidence that these operations were executed without the requirement of guarantees and with the improper waiver of contractual premiums, resulting in a loss of approximately R$1.2 billion to public coffers.

On May 17, 2017, the technical area of the Federal Court of Auditors (TCU) calculated that BNDES had incurred losses of R$711.3 million in stock and debenture purchases from the JBS group. The auditors stated that there had been a "gratuitous transfer of public money" to the company. This material was one of the elements that led to Operation Bullish. TCU technicians assessed that BNDES failed to collect the resources it was entitled to, did not supervise the use of the invested money, and did not consider the social impact of the operations carried out with the group.

=== Operation Achilles Tendon ===
On June 9, 2017, the Federal Police carried out a search and seizure operation at the headquarters of JBS in São Paulo. The operation, conducted in conjunction with the Securities and Exchange Commission (CVM), investigated whether JBS and its parent company engaged in insider trading of dollars in the days leading up to the plea bargain of Joesley and Wesley Batista. The operation also investigated the company's activities in the futures market and the dealings of its controlling shareholder FB Participações SA with the company's shares. Three search warrants and four coercive measures were executed.

=== Operation Car Wash ===
JBS and its owners are involved in Brazil's largest political scandal, which has implicated a sitting President of the Republic as well as a Senator. Although the financial amounts involved are not as substantial as those in the country's largest corruption scandal in recent history, the Car Wash operation, the embezzlement carried out by the Workers' Party and its allies in Petrobras, and the JBS scandal are comparable events. This is due to Joesley Batista's plea bargain, which directly implicated President Michel Temer, including highly compromising audio and video recordings. In addition to President Temer, Senator Aécio Neves, who was the target of Operation Patmos, was also mentioned and recorded by the whistleblower.

Due to the plea bargain, the Central Bank of Norway withdrew JBS from its Government Pension Fund investments. The bank held US$143.4 million in JBS shares.

In 2019, Edson Fachin requested the lifting of the Batista brothers' criminal immunity, which led to a 7% drop in JBS shares, resulting in a loss of R$3 billion. The request was made for crimes committed after the plea bargain. The brothers failed to inform the Federal Public Prosecutor's Office about the illicit conduct of former prosecutor Marcelo Miller, who was accused by the Federal Police of receiving R$1.8 million from J&F Investimentos to act as a double agent during the plea bargain negotiations. Joesley and Ricardo Saud took four months to disclose the payment of R$500,000 to Ciro Nogueira during Dilma Rousseff's impeachment. The brothers also profited from the sale of JBS shares through insider trading contracts with the dollar. Another factor contributing to the stock market decline was the police summons issued against Dilma Rousseff, Renan Calheiros, Eduardo Braga, and Vital do Rêgo regarding illicit donations of R$40 million from JBS to politicians in the 2014 presidential elections.

=== Tax havens ===
The precise number of JBS's foreign subsidiaries is unknown. The company reported having 32 subsidiaries to the Securities and Exchange Commission (CVM), but it told ((o))eco that the number is over 100. In a document submitted to the Securities and Exchange Commission (SEC), the company stated that it had 253 controlled subsidiaries in 30 countries. Many of the officially declared subsidiaries have conflicting or missing data.

In 2016, JBS attempted to relocate its headquarters to Ireland with listings on the New York Stock Exchange. The decision was based on a study by PwC. The move was vetoed by BNDES, which was viewed negatively by foreign shareholders. Wesley Batista accepted the decision and promised to seek an alternative.

In 2019, JBS considered relocating its headquarters to Luxembourg or the Netherlands as part of its initial public offering process. The plan was called Project Hydra and would involve the relocation of JBS S/A, JBS Global, and Seara. In 2020, documents prepared by Deloitte revealed a plan to move to the two countries called "Crystal," aiming to mitigate tax risks and exposure. JBS stated that it is a multinational company, and the opening and closing of offices are routine.

In 2021, a survey conducted by ((o))eco showed that JBS, Marfrig, and Minerva control at least 14 companies in tax havens, in addition to other companies located in countries that are not tax havens but offer facilities, such as Austria.

== JBS Parliamentary Inquiry Commission ==
On September 5, 2017, the National Congress created the JBS Parliamentary Inquiry Commission, a Parliamentary Commission of Inquiry (CPI), which aims to investigate the alleged irregularities committed by the J&F group, which controls JBS, in relation to loans from the Brazilian Development Bank (BNDES) between 2007 and 2016, and the collaboration agreement of the group with the Federal Public Ministry. The CPI has been criticized by lawmakers and the press for being used, in the words of João Gualberto and Otto Alencar, to pressure the Federal Public Ministry, and to change the rules of plea bargaining. Senator Randolfe Rodrigues, a critic of the CPI, filed a writ of mandamus with the Supreme Federal Court requesting the suspension of its proceedings. According to Randolfe, the CPI aims to "corner" the independence of the Judiciary and the Federal Public Ministry.

== Animal welfare ==
On July 17, 2018, the NGO Mercy For Animals released an investigation at Tosh Farms, a JBS supplier in the United States. The footage showed terrible animal suffering, including:

- Employees kicking, punching, and slapping the animals' faces.
- Sows confined in tiny crates so small that they can't even turn around or lie down comfortably.
- Employees violently slamming piglets' heads against the floor to kill them and piglets suffering without proper veterinary care.
- Employees ripping testicles and cutting piglets' teeth without any anesthesia.

After the release of the footage, JBS USA, the American arm of JBS, stated that it had suspended its contract with Tosh Farms based in Tennessee, United States. The supplier provided the JBS USA facility in Kentucky.

In Brazil, the company committed to eliminating gestation crates for sows in its operations by 2025. However, the use of such crates has not yet been prohibited by the company in its supply chains in other countries.

== Diseases ==
Meatpacking plants are prone to the emergence of new diseases due to the forced proximity between humans and animals. Another factor is deforestation. According to the USAID, 31% of diseases transmitted from animals to humans are caused by the degradation of their natural habitats. In Brazil, the Amazon rainforest alone has identified 160 species of bats containing 3,204 different types of coronaviruses.

=== COVID-19 cases ===
During the COVID-19 pandemic, under pressure from the Ministry of Agriculture, Livestock, and Supply, the meatpacking plants were considered essential and did not halt their operations. In 2020, there was an outbreak of cases in meatpacking plants throughout the country. JBS had cases of COVID-19 in a meatpacking plant in Passo Fundo. The cases triggered an investigation by the Ministério Público do Trabalho.

In the United States, JBS along with other companies such as Tyson Foods, Cargill, Smithfield Foods, and National Beef had 59,000 cases and 269 deaths between March 2020 and February 2021. This led the Donald Trump administration to invoke the Defense Production Act (DPA), a law created to ensure supply during the Korean War, to keep the meatpacking plants operating.

== Environmental allegations ==
Despite receiving sustainability awards, and announcing its commitment to reduce carbon emissions by 2040, critics claim JBS has been increasing its emissions. In 2022 one study estimated the company's carbon footprint was larger than that of Italy. Critics also claim the company's environmental policies are a form of greenwashing.

A study conducted in 2021 by the Institute of Agriculture and Trade Policy (IATP) and GRAIN found that JBS is the largest emitter of greenhouse gases among meat and dairy companies by a significant amount, which is linked to the company's economic growth that increases emissions related to meat production and causes deforestation and destruction of watersheds, mainly in Brazil. The Corporate Climate Responsibility Monitor by the New Climate Institute and Carbon Market Watch in 2022 rates JBS programs with very low transparency and integrity.

JBS released 421.6 million metric tonnes of carbon in 2021, which is a larger output than all of Italy. In a five-year period, JBS's emissions increased by 50%.

In December 2022, Brazilian federal prosecutors released a report showing that "Nearly 17% of the cattle bought by JBS SA in Brazil's Para state in the Amazon rainforest allegedly came from ranches with "irregularities" such as illegal deforestation", according to Reuters.

=== Deforestation ===
According to JBS, the company already has a zero deforestation policy with its direct suppliers. In 2020, the company announced a plan for zero deforestation by 2025, which will include the implementation of a system to monitor other suppliers. JBS has also created an investment fund (Amazon Fund), with the goal of reaching R$1 billion in funds raised. However, little progress is being made.

In 2009, the Greenpeace released a report called "A Farra do Boi" (The Ox's Frenzy), exposing the connection between slaughterhouses such as JBS and illegal deforestation. The report forced the slaughterhouses to sign the TAC da Carne (Cattle Agreement) in 2010, committing to purchasing cattle from areas free of illegal deforestation. In 2017, Greenpeace stopped monitoring JBS' compliance with the Compromisso Público da Pecuária na Amazônia (Public Commitment for Livestock in the Amazon) until the company proves it is meeting all the established criteria.

In 2011, the Public Prosecutor's Office sent a notice to JBS for purchasing cattle from slaughterhouses involved in environmental crimes in the Maraiwatsede Indigenous Land, in violation of the Cattle Agreement.

Repórter Brasil revealed that in 2013, JBS acquired hundreds of cattle heads from Cirineide Bianchi Castanha, mother of Ezequiel Antônio Castanha, wanted by the Federal Police for being the biggest deforester in the Amazon of all time. Additionally, he is accused of money laundering, land grabbing, and encroachment on public areas. Onério Castanha, his father, was one of the group's biggest fronts and is also accused of deforestation and modern-day slavery. JBS stated that Onério had already been disconnected from the company since 2012 but would also disconnect from Cirineide.

In 2017, De Olho nos Ruralistas, an observatory of agribusiness in Brazil, published an article revealing that JBS had purchased 449 cattle heads from Eliseu Padilha's farm, Chief of Staff of the Civil House in the Michel Temer government, since 2014. Fazenda Cachoeira was embargoed for the illegal deforestation of 755 hectares and did not have authorization from the State Secretary of the Environment to engage in livestock farming. The farm was located within the Serra Ricardo Franco State Park in Mato Grosso. Padilha controlled four more properties within the park and moved the cattle to avoid the embargoes. The Michel Temer government attempted to protect him, but Padilha faced a fine of R$38.22 million in 2016. Much of the deforestation took place shortly after the creation of the park in 1994.

In 2017, the Instituto do Homem e Meio Ambiente da Amazônia and the Instituto Centro de Vida classified JBS as the first among meat industry companies involved in deforestation in the Amazon.

In 2017, the Brazilian Institute of the Environment and Renewable Natural Resources carried out Operation Cold Meat (not to be confused with Operation Weak Meat), which investigated 15 slaughterhouses and 20 farms that sold meat from embargoed areas for ten months. Two slaughterhouses connected to JBS were investigated. It was found that in some cases, the sales of cattle raised in deforested areas were made directly to the companies. In other cases, they falsified the origin of the cattle or raised them alongside legal areas, which were mixed during the sale. Another issue is the illegal vaccination of cattle. The vaccines are georeferenced, so illegal producers avoid them to avoid incrimination. The company was fined R$24.7 million. JBS denies having purchased cattle heads from the slaughterhouses in question. The operation was launched without the knowledge of the Ministry of the Environment and faced an attempt to cover it up by the Michel Temer government. As a consequence, Luiz Paulo Printes, acting superintendent of Ibama, was removed from his position. In 2019, an investigation conducted by Repórter Brasil, The Guardian, and Bureau of Investigative Journalism found that JBS continued to purchase cattle raised in deforested pastures. JBS refuted the claims, stating that they have a robust monitoring system.

In 2019, a partnership between the Stockholm Environment Institute and Global Canopy found that JBS is responsible for the destruction of 28,000 to 32,000 hectares of forests annually for meat exports. The data does not account for domestic consumption in Brazil. Mighty Earth published a report between March 2019 and November 2020 involving ten companies involved in deforestation in the Amazon and Cerrado, including JBS, Cargill, Bunge, Marfrig, COFCO IMTL, Minerva Foods, ADM, ALZ, Amaggi, and LDC. JBS received the lowest ranking in the report. The survey was conducted using satellite images from the National Institute for Space Research (INPE) and other institutions.

In 2020, Nordea, the largest bank in northern Europe, divested R$240 million from JBS due to the company's involvement in corruption scandals, deforestation, slave labor, and cases of COVID-19 in the slaughterhouses.

In 2020, a report by Amnesty International, supported by a study published in the journal Science, accuses JBS of violating the UN guidelines on corporate social responsibility and human rights and the industry's beef agreement by selling cattle that grazed illegally in indigenous lands that were deforested. The report shows that the lack of monitoring systems allows indirect suppliers, which represent more than half of the suppliers, to have the freedom to deforest. JBS responded that independent audits by DNV-GL and BDO show 99.9% compliance with general terms. DNV-GL stated that JBS misused the reports since they cannot prove that the company's products are free from deforestation.

In 2021, an audit by the Federal Public Ministry showed an increase in the meat marketed in Pará that contained irregularities, mainly coming from deforested areas. In 2019, the percentage was 8.3%, which jumped to 32% in 2021. The company disputes the data. The calendar of the National Institute for Space Research (INPE) runs from August 1 of one year to August 30 of the following year, but since the investigation started on August 1, the company considered only the data from the following year. Thus, technically, the company would meet the criteria of the Carne Agreement, signed by 49 Pará slaughterhouses. Nevertheless, the values represent an increasing trend. Therefore, JBS committed to improving audits and allocated R$5 million to the government of Pará. In November, the Bolsonaro government presented JBS at the COP-26 as a success story in decarbonizing the animal protein sector, contradicting the report by the Federal Public Ministry. The Sustainable Livestock Working Group, an NGO that includes JBS and other companies such as Santander and Marfrig, stated that the company is aligned with the best practices in science.

In 2021, Repórter Brasil, along with Mighty Earth, published an investigation linking major retailers in the United States, the United Kingdom, and the European Union to deforestation in the Amazon. The cattle that grazed in deforested areas were sold after reaching a certain age on farms by indirect suppliers, who later sell them to slaughterhouses. Two prominent retail resellers are Lidl and METRO, for selling "in natura" meat. JBS responded that they have adopted the Transparent Livestock Platform strategy to address the problem. Lidl and Metro stated that 90% of the resold meat is regional and that they are concerned about deforestation. An investigative report by ((o))eco reveals that Dutch and Japanese pension funds are investing in meat industry companies involved in deforestation. The data comes from an analysis conducted by the Forests and Finance NGO and involves companies such as ABP, PFZW, and GPIF.

Due to the report in 2020, the Lidl Netherlands, Ahold Delhaize, Carrefour Belgium, Auchan, Sainsbury's, and Princes Group imposed sanctions on JBS. Lidl announced that it would no longer resell meat from South America as a whole, and Albert Heijn (a brand of Ahold Delhaize) announced that it would not resell meat from Brazil. European markets had already announced the boycott in March due to Bill 510/21, which they considered a threat to the Amazon rainforest. In 2022, Aldi announced that it would not resell Brazilian meat. However, other institutions such as the bank UBS continue with their investments.

=== Involvement with Chaules Volban Pozzebon ===
Between 2018 and 2022, the meatpacking company JBS S.A. purchased 8,785 head of cattle from three farms owned by Pozzebon, without the company's alleged monitoring system indicating the problematic nature of the transactions. The company acknowledged the purchases and stated that it was the result of an internal scheme by employees to favor Chaules' farms.

Pozzebon was the leader of a criminal organization engaged in illegal logging and extortion, known as the owner of 120 sawmills throughout the Northern region of the country, which earned him the title of 'Brazil's largest deforester'. He was arrested during the 'Deforest Operation', conducted by the Federal Police, which led to his conviction to 99 years in prison.

=== Carbon emissions ===
JBS has a net-zero emissions program by 2040. The company has also implemented two international projects to include herbs such as lemongrass and tannin in cattle diets to reduce methane emissions. The practice is based on a study commissioned by Burger King, whose data and application have been questioned by researchers.

In 2022, a report by the New Climate Institute and Carbon Market Watch revealed that multinational corporations such as JBS, Vale, Sony, Google, and Nestlé lack transparency and integrity in their net-zero carbon programs. These companies collectively account for 5% of global greenhouse gas emissions, and their measures only result in a maximum reduction of 20% in their carbon footprint. In response, JBS stated that the report is misleading and that their Net Zero program was approved by the Science-Based Targets Initiative (SBTi) in 2021. SBTi also announced that they will review their methodology to align with new standards.

In March 2024, New York Attorney General Letitia James sued JBS USA for violating the state's general business laws on deceptive practices and false advertising. The lawsuit alleges that since a majority of Americans prefer and are willing to pay more for net-zero products, JBS initiated its "Net Zero by 2040" marketing campaign before even identifying its Scope 3 emissions arising from the full supply chain of meat production. At the 2023 Climate Week NYC event, JBS S.A. CEO Gilberto Tomazoni was questioned by New York Times reporter David Gelles over the Better Business Bureau's determination that JBS' net zero marketing was unsubstantiated, given that the company lacked specific planning to execute on this goal.

In 2025, a coalition of climate advocacy groups released a research report which claimed that JBS emissions exceeded the emissions of ExxonMobil and Shell combined.

== Awards ==
- Marketing Best 2014 with the slogan "Friboi, carne confiável tem nome" (Friboi, reliable meat has a name)
- Troféu Ponto Extra 2012 (Extra Point Trophy)
- Largest Food and Publicly Traded Company in Brazil
- Largest Food Company in Brazil according to the Valor 1000 Ranking
- Fimec 2012 Award
- Best Company in Media Relations

== Board of directors ==
As of April 30, 2019, board members include:

- Jeremiah O'Callaghan (chair)
- José Batista Sobrinho
- Aguinaldo Gomes Ramos Filho
- Gilberto Meirelles Xandó Baptista
- Wesley Mendonça Batista Filho
- José Guimarães Monforte
- Cledorvino Belini
- Alba Pettengill
- Márcio Guedes Pereira Júnior

== See also ==
- JBS Foods International
- JBS USA
- BRF
- Marfrig
- BNDES
- List of scandals in Brazil
- Michel Temer
- Operation Car Wash
- Impact of the COVID-19 pandemic on the meat industry in the United States
