= Carne confiável tem nome =

Advertising campaign

Carne confiável tem nome (trustable meat has a name) was a slogan and advertising campaign from Friboi, a meat brand owned by JBS S.A..

The advertisements were focused on "information, transparency and credibility". They were popular amongst consumers and had a strong presence on the internet, but the public view quickly changed after Operation Weak Meat from the Federal Police of Brazil showed a corruption scheme where the biggest companies from the sector were selling rotten meat.

== Timeline ==
=== Beginnings ===
The advertisements were under production since 2011. Friboi first campaign was in 2012, where consumers could trade seals from the meat package for miniatures of sertanejo musicians. Afterwards, JBS invested in television advertisements, produced by Lew´LaraTBWA and had on average 30 seconds each. This was the first initiative involving huge sums of money in media communication, and was important to create an identity for the brand.

The first protagonist from the advertisements was Tony Ramos, hired in 2013. He was chosen amongst other nine actors, including Antonio Fagundes, Tarcísio Meira, Regina Duarte and Marieta Severo. Initially, he received R$ 3 million. He was substituted by Roberto Carlos in February 2014, but he was soon fired due lack of naturality in his acting. His contract was worth R$ 25 million. Roberto Carlos sued JBS in R$ 7.2 million, but on 11 November the Court of Justice of São Paulo archived the case. In the same year, Tony Ramos came back as the main protagonist from the advertisement campaign. His contract was worth R$ 5 million. On 15 April, Tony Ramos and Roberto Carlos participated on the same advertisement. In 2015, Friboi tried without success to hire Silvio Santos for their advertisements. In 2016, Ana Maria Braga closed a R$ 1 million contract with Friboi and became the Embassator of Friboi Meat Academy. In the same year, Rodrigo Faro opened a segment on his program, Hora do Faro, to publicize Friboi meat.

=== Operation Weak Meat ===
On 7 March 2017, the Federal Police of Brazil launched the Operation Weak Meat, where a corruption scheme perpetrated by the biggest companies from the sector was investigated. The Ministry of Agriculture was supposedly bribed for agricultural inspectors to issue licenses for rotten meat. Joesley Batista also gave a turn state's evidence affirming that the President of Brazil Michel Temer was involved on the scheme.

After the operation, JBS accidentally published an advertisement showing expired meat. Ramos subsequently broke his contract. According to him, he didn't have contact with JBS, only with the advertisement companies, but he trusted in the quality of Friboi meat. Ramos last advertisement was shown at 20 March. Afterwards, Friboi stopped showing their advertisements on open TV. Initially, Ana Maria Braga defended JBS, but on June she also broke her contract. Fátima Bernardes, that worked on the advertisements of Seara, another brand from JBS, also fired herself, but came back to the job in 2020.

== Advertisement campaigns ==
=== Tony Ramos ===
In the advertisements, Tony Ramos approached consumers in their houses or supermarket and asked them about what kind of meat they eat. After discovering they consume Friboi or finding the meat on their fridge, Ramos says "trustable meat has a name". Some advertisements also showed JBS factory to expose how the meat was produced.

=== Roberto Carlos ===
In the advertisement, Roberto Carlos affirmed changing his vegetarian diet because of Friboi. After he left in 2014, his songs kept being used by JBS. His change of diet was seem as polemical at the time, but according to Fernando Meirelles, Roberto Carlos didn't even cut the meat during the filming.

=== Rodrigo Faro ===
Hora do Faro inaugurated the segment Myths and Truths, where he presented facts about bovine meat. The segment was launched on 18 October 2015 and had six episodes. Faro also inserted Friboi commercials in his program.

=== Friboi Meat Academy ===
Friboi Meat Academy was an online platform with meat related courses. It was a collaboration of JBS and Grupo Globo. The academy was officially opened in São Paulo on 17 April 2016.

== Popularity ==
TVxtender was hired to spread the advertisements on the internet. On August 2013, Friboi mentions on social media, specially Facebook, jumped from 66/day to 10.866/day and from 35 thousand followers to 455 thousand followers. There was also an increase in sales of 20.2%. Memes and parodies about the advertisements became widely popular. JBS created their own memes and Tony Ramos catchphrases were adapted as ringtones. Roberto Carlos was also transformed into a meme. Tony Ramos had to explain what a meme was to Roberto Carlos. The advertisements were also remixed into YouTube Poops.

Despite the popularity of the advertisements, a series of critiques were made. On 15 August 2013, the senator Kátia Abreu (PSD) accused the advertisements of false advertising for inducing the consumer to think that meat from other brands are unsafe. In 2014, The Vegetarian Society of Brazil sued JBS for affirming in an advertisement that meat is essencial in meals, but the Ethics Concil from Conselho Nacional de Autorregulamentação Publicitária (CONAR) archived the process. In April 2015, Confederação Brasileira Democrática dos Trabalhadores nas Indústrias da Alimentação (CONTAC) published a parody of the advertisements where the cashier gave reasons not to buy Friboi meat. As a result, JBS agreed to raise the health plans of 50 thousand workers.

After the repercussion of Operation Weak Meat, Tony Ramos was attacked and had memes made after him on Twitter. On 17 February 2017, depreciative Friboi memes were on trending topics on Twitter. Friboi suffered a boycot and JBS changed their labels to "Do Chef".

== Prizes ==
- Marketing Best (2014)
