= JBS Parliamentary Inquiry Commission =

The JBS Parliamentary Inquiry Commission, better known as JBS CPI or JBS CPMI, is a Parliamentary Inquiry Commission created on September 5, 2017, with the purpose of investigating alleged irregularities committed by the J&F group, which controls the JBS meatpacking company, in relation to loans from the Brazilian Development Bank (BNDES) between the years 2007 and 2016, as well as the plea bargain agreement made by the group with the Federal Public Prosecutor's Office.

== Rapporteur ==
On September 12, 2017, Deputy Carlos Marun (PMDB-MS) was chosen as the rapporteur of the Joint Parliamentary Inquiry Commission (CPMI) established to investigate irregularities involving the JBS group and the J&F holding in operations with the BNDES, and

Ronaldo Caiado (DEM-GO) was elected as the Vice President of the Joint CPI.

=== Reactions ===
The appointment of Marun as rapporteur provoked reactions from other lawmakers. Senator Ricardo Ferraço requested to be removed from the commission, justifying that he did not want to participate in what he considered "revenge and back-and-forth".

The rapporteur Marun is also accused of administrative misconduct for embezzling 16.6 million reais. Marun, who informed the CPI about the case, denies the allegations.

== Summonses ==
On September 21, 2017, the CPI approved the summoning of former Attorney General Rodrigo Janot, former prosecutor Marcelo Miller, and prosecutor Ângelo Goulart Villela.

The CPI also approved the summoning of brothers Joesley and Wesley Batista, the controllers of the J&F group, owner of JBS, as well as executives Ricardo Saud, Valdir Aparecido Boni, Francisco Assis e Silva, Florisvaldo Caetano de Oliveira, Fábio Chilo, and Demilton Antônio de Castro, former BNDES president Luciano Coutinho, and JBS lawyer Willer Tomaz de Souza.

== Support ==
One of the supporters of the CPI, rapporteur Carlos Marun, said, "This CPI is not mine, it's not yours, it's not Deputy João Gualberto's or Senator Ronaldo Caiado's. It didn't come out of nowhere. A few months ago, Brazil woke up surprised by the information that Joesley revealed that campaign contributions were bribes." Marun also said that "even as a confessed defendant, perhaps one of the greatest offenders in Brazilian history, he had received eternal forgiveness." The rapporteur said that the CPI "does authorize the investigation of the circumstances of this agreement."

== Criticisms ==
Approximately one-third of the current members of the Joint CPI receive funding from JBS. In total, about 4 million reais were donated to the campaigns of 15 out of the 49 parliamentarians who are part of the commission. The choice of the rapporteur caused Ricardo Ferraço and Otto Alencar to withdraw from the commission. According to Deputy Ivan Valente from PSOL, the number of lawmakers funded by JBS compromises the work of the commission. Valente stated, "Serious members of the CPI should request the recusal of those who are directly connected to receiving funds from JBS."

Senator Randolfe Rodrigues argued that the Joint Parliamentary Inquiry Commission created to investigate JBS aims to "corner" the independence of the Judiciary and the Public Prosecutor's Office. Randolfe filed a writ of mandamus with the Supreme Federal Court requesting the suspension of the CPI's work. The action is being reviewed by Minister Dias Toffoli. According to Randolfe, "this Joint CPI has an unusual alliance: Marun, Temer's PMDB, and the PT are all on the same side. What unites them? Retaliating against those who want to investigate them. Marun and the PT are so close, intertwined, that it's no longer just a flirtation, but a marriage," criticized the Amapá lawmaker, for whom the purpose of the Joint CPI was never to investigate JBS wrongdoings but rather to "retaliate against the Federal Public Prosecutor's Office."

According to Revista Época, the PMDB and the PT allied themselves in the CPI to attack the Public Prosecutor's Office and the whistleblowers. According to the magazine, this unlikely harmony between the PT and the PMDB, allies in the Dilma administration and enemies due to the impeachment just a year ago, shows the fast-paced dynamics of politics driven by the Lava Jato investigation. It is based on the well-known technique of many CPIs, in which lawmakers—even those from opposing sides—join forces to shield allies and embarrass enemies. All requests to summon former President Lula were shelved.

Another criticism of the CPI is that, according to the newspaper Folha de S.Paulo, allies of the Michel Temer government are using the commission installed in the Congress to create a political environment that allows for the acquittal of the accused and discourages future plea bargains.

According to the website O Antagonista, the Palácio do Planalto has infiltrated the CPI to corner Rodrigo Janot and Supreme Court Justice Edson Fachin. According to O Antagonista, this is the first CPI to investigate the investigators.

Another critic, Federal Deputy João Gualberto (PSDB), believes that the commission will end up being a "cover-up," just like the Petrobras CPI. "This CPI is only meant to harass the Public Prosecutor's Office. But I won't do what Otto did, I'm here to denounce this. Those who should be called to testify are the executives and the politicians. Those are the people who should be invited. Only after that should the Public Prosecutor's Office and the Federal Police be invited, after requesting all the documentation, for us to study everything. It will be worse than the Petrobras CPI. I hope I'm wrong and have to apologize to you."

Behind the scenes, the Joint CPI is seen as an opportunity for allies of Michel Temer to discredit the plea agreements reached by the Public Prosecutor's Office.

== See also ==
- Operation Weak Meat
