= Ticiana Villas Boas =

Brazilian journalist

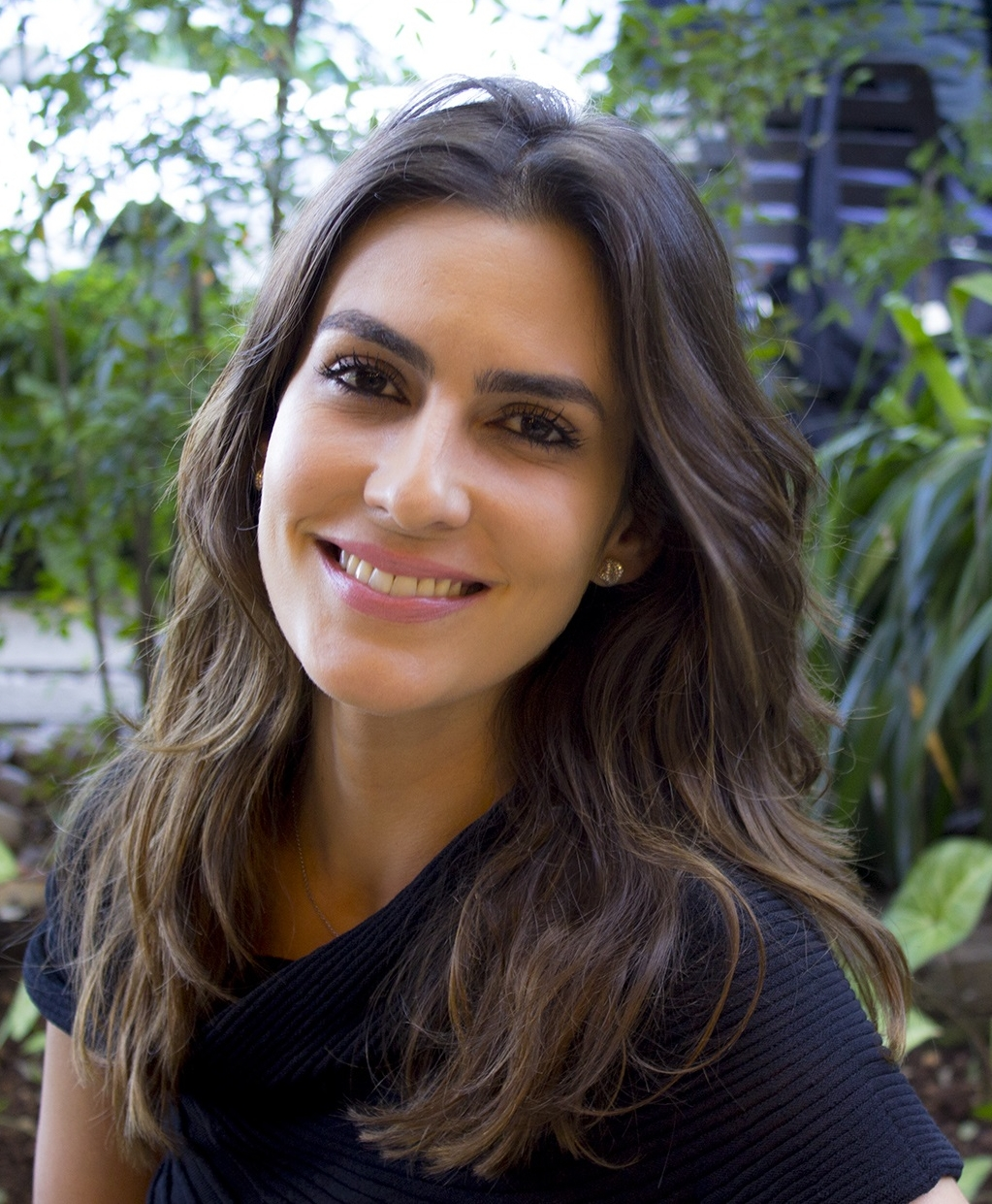
- Villas Boas in 2013
- Born: November 22, 1980 (age 45); Salvador, Bahia, Brazil
- Occupations: Journalist and TV host
- Spouse: Joesley Batista (m. 2012)
- Children: 3

Ticiana Tanajura Villas Boas Batista, better known as Ticiana Villas Boas (born November 22, 1980) is a Brazilian journalist and TV host.

== Biography ==
Ticiana began her career in 2005 as a reporter from Bahia for Jornal da Band, on Rede Bandeirantes. In 2006 she was transferred to São Paulo and, in 2007, took over the presentation of the electronic magazine Atualíssima alongside Leão Lobo. In 2008 she returned to Jornal da Band as an anchor alongside Ricardo Boechat. She participated and anchored important coverage such as the Pope's visit to Brazil, the Olympics, the World Cup, in addition to the tragedies of floods in Santa Catarina and landslides and deaths in Teresópolis, Rio de Janeiro.

In 2010, she won the Troféu Mulher Imprensa for best news anchor in 2009, promoted by Revista Imprensa. On April 28, 2015, she signed a contract with SBT to present the reality show Bake Off Brasil. On the same channel, she presented another reality show, starting in February 2016, BBQ Brasil: Churrasco na Brasa. In October of the same year, she also led the reality show Duelo de Mães. In 2017, she left SBT when her husband, Joesley Batista, became the target of an investigation by the Federal Police, involved in illicit business between the Government and JBS.

In July 2020, she was invited to lead Bake Off Brasil for three weeks in which Nadja Haddad tested positive for Covid-19. In 2021, after being discarded for the Vem Pra Cá program, she signed with Band and returned with Duelo de Mães. On February 11, 2022, Ticiana announced her departure from Band for the second time, in addition to leaving TV permanently to dedicate herself to new projects.

== Controversies ==
Ticiana is married to the businessman Joesley Batista, president of J&F, the holding company of JBS, one of the largest food industries in the world. In May 2014, a controversy arose after the removal from the Veja magazine website, without further explanation, of a video where the journalist gave an interview about her life as a married and wealthy woman with no limits on personal expenses and without knowledge of the prices of things. common everyday products such as car gasoline. According to another site, Imprensa, the material was removed from the magazine's portal after pressure from the businessman, with Veja giving in to the demand for fear of losing its advertisers. Among others, Batista is also the owner of brands such as Seara and Neutrox.
