= Port Investigation =

The Port Investigation refers to a police inquiry conducted by of the Federal Police of Brazil which investigated the alleged favoritism of companies connected to the port sector. In a decree signed by President Michel Temer, which extended concession contracts at the Port of Santos, Rodrimar was said to be the main beneficiary. This was edited in exchange for bribes to the president and his main allies. It was the first time in Brazil's history that a sitting president had their bank records investigated.

The case was handled by Luís Roberto Barroso, a justice of the Supreme Federal Court. The inquiry was concluded on October 16, 2018, resulting in the indictment of eleven individuals, including Michel Temer and his daughter, with requests for the seizure and asset blocking of those accused as well as for the preventive imprisonment of four of them. Additionally, the investigation led to Operation Skala, which temporarily arrested allies and friends of the president, as well as businessmen from the port sector.

== Background ==
During the investigations of Operation Patmos and the JBS case, wiretapped phone calls on May 4, 2017 showed President Temer's aides discussing changes to the rules for granting port exploration, including former deputy Rodrigo Rocha Loures. Rocha Loures appeared in a conversation with Gustavo do Vale Rocha, Deputy Chief for Legal Affairs of the Civil House, advocating for the interests of companies connected to the Brazilian port sector. The text of Decree No. 9,048/2017, signed days later, allowed for the extension of port concessions from 25 to 35 years, up to a limit of 70 years, without bidding. This would benefit Rodrimar, which had already been mentioned in another inquiry involving Temer, where he was investigated for alleged involvement in a corruption scheme involving concessionaires of the Port of Santos.

The previous inquiry was initiated by the Federal Police in 2004 after delegates received a copy of a lawsuit in which the ex-wife of businessman Marcelo de Azeredo (who presided over the Companhia Docas do Estado de São Paulo, the state-owned company that previously managed the Port of Santos) requested alimony and a share of her ex-husband's assets, accusing him of leading a corruption scheme at the port together with then-federal deputy Michel Temer and Colonel João Batista Lima Filho. The rapporteur of the case was Minister Marco Aurélio Mello, who in April 2011 decided to shelve the investigation against Temer.

In his plea bargain agreement with Operation Car Wash, the whistleblower Lúcio Funaro, who is considered the PMDB's operator in the Chamber of Deputies, had already linked Temer, Eduardo Cunha, Henrique Eduardo Alves, the Grupo Libra, and Rodrimar to a corruption scheme in the port sector. Funaro stated that Michel Temer has business with Rodrimar and that former deputy Eduardo Cunha, at Temer's request, orchestrated the approval in May 2013 of the Port Measure (MP 595/13) to defend the interests of groups connected to both of them. According to the whistleblower: "This MP was created for the reform of the port sector and it would cause great damage to the Libra group, which is an ally of Cunha and consequently of Michel Temer because it is one of the major donors to Michel Temer's campaigns. And Eduardo told me that at the time Michel asked him: 'Look, you have to do this, you have to do this, take care of this,' so that the business wouldn't get out of control."

== Inquiry ==
In June 2017, then-Attorney General Rodrigo Janot requested the opening of a new inquiry to investigate Temer and Rodrigo Rocha Loures. The request for the opening of the inquiry was initially sent to Justice Edson Fachin, who decided that the case should be assigned to another Supreme Court justice because it was unrelated to the inquiry that arose from the JBS testimonies. Thus, Justice Luís Roberto Barroso became the rapporteur of the case. In September, Barroso ordered the opening of the inquiry based on the statements of the executives of the JBS group to investigate the President of the Republic for suspicion of corruption and money laundering in relation to the decree.

On February 27, Barroso ordered the lifting of bank secrecy of Temer, covering the period from 2013 to 2017, as well as former deputy Rodrigo Rocha Loures and Colonel João Baptista Lima.

On March 24, 2018, Barroso authorized the Ministry of Public Prosecution to receive copies of the previous investigations filed in 2011 regarding the alleged irregularities at the Port of Santos. For the investigators, access to the old inquiry could help the ongoing investigation since the same individuals who were targeted in the previous inquiry are currently under investigation.

In addition to the information from the inquiry filed in 2011, the investigation also relied on a report from the Federal Court of Accounts (TCU) that pointed out "strong indications of illegality" in the Ports Decree and that it could be unconstitutional.

The inquiry was concluded on October 16, 2018, resulting in the indictment of eleven people, including Michel Temer and his daughter Maristela, with requests for the seizure and blocking of assets of all the indicted individuals and requests for the preventive imprisonment of four of them. The rapporteur forwarded the inquiry to the Attorney General's Office for a response within 15 days.

== Fall of Segovia ==
On February 9, 2018, Fernando Segovia, the Director-General of the Federal Police appointed by Temer on November 20, 2017, stated in an interview with the Reuters agency that no evidence of wrongdoing by Temer was found in the inquiry, and that the Federal Police would request the closure of the investigations. Segovia's statements caused intense negative repercussions, and Justice Barroso summoned the Director-General to provide explanations. Subsequently, the Attorney General of the Republic, Raquel Dodge, requested that the Supreme Federal Court issue a judicial order preventing Segovia from "any act of interference" in the inquiry, under penalty of removal from office. The Ministry of Public Security, under Raul Jungmann, ended up dismissing Fernando Segovia on February 27, less than four months after his appointment.

== Operation Skala ==
On March 29, 2018, Operation Skala was launched by the Federal Police with the purpose of collecting evidence for the Port Investigation. In addition to twenty search and seizure warrants, thirteen temporary arrest warrants were issued, including for:

- José Yunes, identified by whistleblower Lúcio Funaro as responsible for managing the alleged bribes paid to the President
- Wagner Rossi, former deputy and minister, sponsored by Temer and former president of the Companhia Docas do Estado de São Paulo, which manages the Port of Santos.

In authorizing Operation Skala, Justice Barroso pointed out that there are "indications that demonstrate the possibility of an ongoing scheme of granting public benefits in exchange for private resources, for personal and electoral purposes, which has persisted for more than 20 years in the port sector, up until today."

== Acquittals ==
Former President Michel Temer, the main suspect, was acquitted. Also acquitted were former deputy Rodrigo da Rocha Loures (MDB), Colonel João Baptista Lima, who was identified as the financial operator for the former president, and businessmen Antonio Celso Grecco, Carlos Alberto Costa, and Ricardo Mesquita.
