= Operation Bullish =

Operation Bullish is an ongoing corruption investigation in Brazil.

== History ==
On May 12, 2017, Brazilian authorities released that they were investigating whether JBS SA had received illegal financing advantages from the state-owned bank BNDES. Dubbed "Operation Bullish," police stated that such operations had led to a loss of around $385 million in public funds. JBS said financing for its unit was lawful, while BNDES said it was cooperating with authorities. Executives such as CEO Wesley Batista and chairman Joesley Batista were questioned by federal police. The court forbid the Batistas from restructuring the business during the investigation.
