= JBS plea bargain in Operation Car Wash =

The JBS Testimonies in Operation Car Wash refer to the leniency agreement signed between the company JBS and the Office of the Attorney General of Brazil (PGR) in April 2017, within the scope of Operation Car Wash. The Brazilian Supreme Federal Court (STF) approved the agreement on May 18, 2017, based on the plea bargain of the owners Joesley and Wesley Batista and executives of the company. On September 14, 2017, former Attorney General Rodrigo Janot rescinded the agreement with Joesley and Ricardo Saud due to suspicions of obstruction of investigation by the collaborators. The following year, Attorney General Raquel Dodge rescinded the agreement with Wesley Batista and Francisco de Assis e Silva due to their omission of criminal facts of which they were aware.

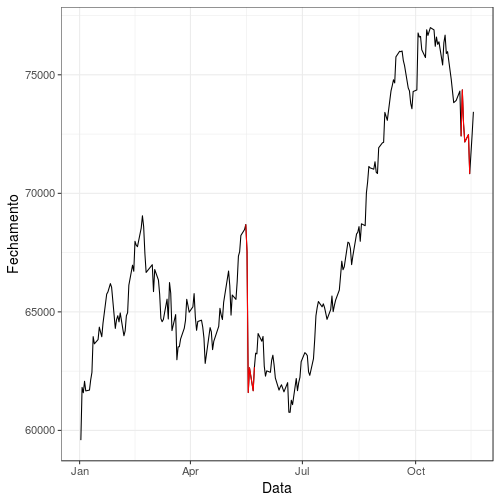
Daily closing of the Ibovespa from January 1, 2017, to November 17, 2017. The red regions mark the weeks of the JBS testimonies and President Temer's speech about the lack of political support to approve the pension reform, respectively.

After the testimonies, the São Paulo Stock Exchange (B3) experienced a significant decline, as did the Brazilian Real. The political power of the Temer government was also impacted, particularly regarding the approval of the pension reform.

According to the JBS executives' testimonies, payments were mentioned for over 1,800 politicians, surpassing five hundred million Brazilian Reais to assist in campaigns.

The first actions resulting from the testimonies were Operation Patmos, Operation Achilles' Tendon – which led to the arrest of Wesley Batista - and the PGR's indictment against Michel Temer, as well as an investigation into various politicians mentioned in the collaboration terms.

== History ==
In early 2017, JBS was the target of several operations by the Federal Police (PF) and the Public Ministry (MPF), including Operation Greenfield, Operation Car Wash, and Operation Cui Bono?.

In late March, JBS executives and lawyers approached the Attorney General's Office (PGR) with the purpose of establishing a plea bargain agreement. According to the newspaper O Estado de S.Paulo, Joesley's removal from the business was crucial for him to initiate the collaboration agreement. Throughout the month of April until the first week of May, testimonies were collected to support the plea bargain.

JBS executives informed the PGR that they recorded Michel Temer during a meeting with Joesley Batista at the Palácio do Jaburu outside the president's official schedule. In the conversation, the president suggests "maintaining a good relationship" with the expelled congressman and former president of the Chamber of Deputies Eduardo Cunha, who was arrested in Operation Car Wash, and with operator Lúcio Funaro, also under arrest, in exchange for their silence. Temer also allegedly indicated Rodrigo Rocha Loures as the JBS intermediary in the government.

Recordings were also delivered to the PGR in which Senator Aécio Neves, national president of the Brazilian Social Democracy Party (PSDB), and Andrea Neves, his sister, were caught negotiating with Joesley Batista an amount of 2 million reais for the payment of lawyers for their defense in Operation Car Wash. Aécio appointed his cousin, Frederico Pacheco de Medeiros, as the emissary to receive the bribe.

Shortly after, the PF carried out controlled actions with the delivery of suitcases containing money to Rocha Loures and Aécio's cousin, which were filmed. The PF traced the money given to Aécio's cousin to a company owned by Senator Zeze Perrella.

On May 3, the plea bargain agreement was signed between the whistleblowers and the PGR, and on May 18, the agreement was approved by Supreme Court Justice Edson Fachin.

On May 10, 2018, Raquel Dodge requested the Supreme Court to separate the actions in order to investigate 80 facts described in a supplementary collaboration provided by the whistleblowers. In the request to the Supreme Court, Raquel Dodge requested that the facts be sent to other instances, such as the Superior Court of Justice (STJ) and the first instance.

=== Validation in the Supreme Federal Court ===
In June, the governor of Mato Grosso do Sul, Reinaldo Azambuja (PSDB), appealed to the Supreme Federal Court requesting the removal of Edson Fachin from the relator position in the JBS investigations, alleging that the plea bargains were not related to the corruption case in Petrobras (the main target of the Lava Jato investigations), as well as questioning the benefits granted to the informants. The terms of the plea bargain were criticized by some judges and the government of Michel Temer, as the informants received full criminal immunity in exchange for information about the criminal schemes and were not arrested. The case was brought before the plenary, with the majority of the justices considering the approval of the plea bargain agreement made by Justice Edson Fachin as valid, and also voting for Fachin to remain as the relator of the case.

== Contents of the Testimonies ==
=== Payments to Federal Deputies ===
==== Eduardo Cunha ====
The whistleblower stated that, through a bank account managed by market operator Lúcio Funaro, he transferred 50 million reais between 2009 and 2014 to Eduardo Cunha, former President of the Chamber of Deputies. These payments were made in exchange for favors regarding financing from the Caixa Econômica Federal. Additionally, Joesley mentioned a payment of 20 million reais to Cunha in exchange for changes in legislation to exempt payroll taxes for employees – a matter that financially benefited JBS. Lastly, he also reported transferring another 30 million reais to Cunha, while he was the President of the Chamber, to support the business group's demands in Congress.

=== Payments to Ministers of State ===
==== Guido Mantega ====
Joesley claimed that starting in 2009, he began dealing directly with Guido Mantega, without intermediaries. He mentioned a conversation in which the former minister allegedly said they would agree on bribe percentages "on a case-by-case basis." From 2014 onwards, according to Joesley, he had almost weekly meetings with Mantega, during which the ex-minister presented "multiple lists of politicians and parties that should receive campaign donations." Joesley also mentioned that, at Mantega's request, he made a $5 million loan to the company Pedala Equipamentos Esportivos, which was not repaid, and a $20 million investment in an offshore account.

==== Antônio Palocci ====
Joesley said he met Antônio Palocci in 2008 when he did not hold a public position. The businessman mentioned being curious about understanding the mechanics and backstage of politics. Joesley then legally hired Palocci's company, Projeto Consultoria. The company also provided assistance to the businessman in 2009 by offering an opinion on the American chicken market. In 2010, Palocci became a key figure in Dilma Rousseff's presidential campaign and allegedly requested 30 million reais in donations from Joesley. According to the testimony, the full amount was not paid, but 2.8 million reais were received in cash, and 16 million reais were donated officially to various candidates indicated by Palocci.

=== Payments to Governors ===
==== Fernando Pimentel ====
Joesley reported that during a meeting with Dilma in November 2014 at the Palácio do Planalto, he discussed a request for a 30 million reais contribution made by Edinho Silva, the financial coordinator of Dilma's campaign that year, for Fernando Pimentel's campaign for the governorship of Minas. Joesley informed Dilma that the supposed balance from the two accounts agreed upon with Mantega would be depleted if the request were fulfilled. According to Joesley's testimony, Dilma confirmed the need and asked him to contact Pimentel. The payment would have been made after a meeting with Pimentel through the purchase of a 3 percent stake in the company that operates the Mineirão Stadium. The campaign financial records of Pimentel show 3.9 million reais in contributions from JBS when he was still Dilma Rousseff's minister. However, in April 2021, the Federal Court rejected the charges made by the Federal Public Prosecutor's Office against Fernando Pimentel regarding the campaign contributions given by JBS.

==== Silval Barbosa ====
The relationship between JBS and the former governor of Mato Grosso from the PMDB party allegedly started in 2010 when Barbosa requested contributions for his electoral campaign. According to Joesley, in return, the candidate promised that the company's donations would be offset by a reduction in state taxes. In 2012, the governor allegedly demanded a bribe in exchange for the changes, amounting to 10 million reais per year until 2014. According to the documents from the Office of the Prosecutor General, the payments were made as agreed, except in 2014 when not all installments were paid.

==== Zeca do PT ====
In 2003, during Zeca do PT's term as governor (1999–2006), Joesley Batista allegedly agreed to pay a 20 percent bribe on any fiscal benefit granted to the company in the state. In 2010, Zeca allegedly requested 3 million reais to finance his electoral campaign, paid in two parts: one million reais through an official donation and two million reais in cash.

=== Support in presidential campaigns ===
==== Dilma in 2014 ====
Director Ricardo Saud stated that he paid 35 million reais in bribes to five current and former senators from the PMDB party to secure the support of the entire party for the re-election of Dilma Rousseff in the 2014 presidential election. The money was received by Senators Eduardo Braga, Jader Barbalho, Eunício Oliveira, Renan Calheiros, and former Senator Vital do Rego. Saud also stated that out of this amount, one million reais was supposed to be allocated to Senator Kátia Abreu, but she did not receive the money. The payment request was made by former Finance Minister Guido Mantega to Joesley Batista, who then relayed the order to the director. According to Saud, the money came from a fund of 300 million reais that JBS had made available to the PT for use in the 2014 campaign. However, facts such as Senator Eduardo Braga's statement that Saud's testimony contains gross and serious errors, along with Joesley Batista's undeniable support for presidential candidate Aécio Neves and the buying of deputies during the impeachment vote, weaken the association of JBS with Dilma Rousseff's candidacy.

==== Aécio in 2014 ====
Joesley Batista claims to have been the "largest and most loyal" financier of the electoral campaign of Aécio Neves, a suspended senator, former governor of Minas Gerais, and unsuccessful candidate for the presidency in 2014. He states that he complied with a request for bribes by purchasing a building worth 18 million reais in Belo Horizonte without the need for use. He also reported a request from Andrea Neves, the tucano's sister, for a bribe of 2 million reais "under the argument that he needed to pay lawyers." He claims to have told her that it would be risky to pay in cash, and Andrea Neves suggested inflating invoices from lawyers who were already working for JBS, which would also be used by the senator. JBS also reports a meeting between Frederico Pacheco de Medeiros, Aécio's cousin, and a company executive to discuss ways to "launder" the bribe payments that had been made to Aécio through cash payments and the issuance of fake invoices. Joesley also recounts a meeting with Aécio in March 2017, which was recorded by the businessman, in which the tucano discusses the need for the approval of the abuse of authority law and amnesty for undisclosed campaign financing.

=== Purchase of deputies during the impeachment vote ===
Joesley told investigators that Deputy João Bacelar acted to prevent former Minister Guido Mantega from being summoned to testify before the CARF Commission of Inquiry, of which Bacelar was the rapporteur. The commission was established in 2016 to investigate a scheme of selling court rulings that operated in the Administrative Council for Tax Appeals (CARF), an agency of the Ministry of Finance that reviews appeals against assessments by the Federal Revenue Service. According to the testimony, Joesley would have acted as an intermediary between Mantega and the congressman. Joesley stated that after that, Bacelar started acting in defense of Dilma Rousseff in the impeachment process. The businessman told prosecutors that the congressman appeared at his house the week before the impeachment vote in the Chamber of Deputies, trying to persuade Joesley to "buy" some deputies to vote in favor of Dilma. Bacelar then presented a list of 30 parliamentarians who would be willing to vote for the former president in exchange for five million reais in bribes each. Joesley said he authorized the purchase of five deputies for three million reais each. According to Joesley, out of the agreed 15 million reais with Bacelar, 3.5 million were paid.

On the other hand, advertising executive Elsinho Mouco, accused by Joesley of receiving bribes, told O Estado de S.Paulo that the businessman hired him for two purposes: to elect his brother José Batista Júnior in Goiás and to "overthrow" President Dilma Rousseff in the wake of the impeachment movement. In one of their conversations in May 2016, at the height of the "Out, Dilma" movement, Joesley offered to pay for a social media monitoring service that would guide the PMDB's strategy to shield Temer.

== Termination of agreement with JBS ==
On September 14, 2017, the Attorney General of the Republic, Rodrigo Janot, informed the Supreme Federal Court that the plea bargain of JBS executives had been terminated. According to the institution, the termination does not affect the evidence presented. According to the accusation, some of the evidence presented to the Supreme Court was obtained through the plea bargain of Joesley and Saud. However, according to the Attorney General's Office, "there was deliberate omission, on the part of the referred collaborators, of illicit facts that should have been presented at the time of the signing of the agreements".

In February 2018, the Attorney General Raquel Dodge decided to terminate the plea bargain of Wesley Batista and Francisco de Assis e Silva. According to Dodge, this was due to the investigation of the internal review process of the plea bargains made by the executives of the group, which revealed that they intentionally omitted criminal facts they were already aware of at the time of closing the agreements with the Federal Public Prosecutor's Office.

== Consequences ==
=== Operation Patmos ===
On the night of May 17, 2017, columnist Lauro Jardim of the newspaper O Globo published a note stating that the president had been recorded in the JBS plea bargain, with the following title: "Dono da JBS grava Temer dando aval para compra de silêncio de Cunha" (JBS owner records Temer giving approval for the purchase of Cunha's silence). On the following morning, the Federal Police carried out, by order of Minister Edson Fachin, rapporteur of the Lava Jato case in the STF, and at the request of the Attorney General's Office, the Operation Patmos. The operation executed 41 search and seizure warrants and eight preventive arrest warrants at locations and individuals linked to Michel Temer, Senator Aécio Neves, Senator Zezé Perrella, and Deputy Rodrigo Rocha Loures. Andrea Neves and Frederico Pacheco de Medeiros were arrested. In addition, an inquiry was opened against the President of the Republic, and Senator Aécio Neves and Deputy Rodrigo Rocha Loures were suspended from their parliamentary duties.

=== Accusation and suspension of Aécio from the Senate ===
On June 2, Aécio Neves was accused of passive corruption and attempted obstruction of justice by the Attorney General's Office. At that time, the senator was already suspended from the presidency of the PSDB and from his mandate in the Senate. However, at the end of June, Minister Marco Aurélio Mello, the rapporteur of the case at the Supreme Federal Court, denied a new arrest warrant requested by the Attorney General's Office and allowed the senator to return to his mandate. The Attorney General Rodrigo Janot appealed against the decision of Minister Marco Aurélio Mello and once again requested the senator's arrest and suspension from his mandate. On September 26, by decision of the 1st Panel of the Supreme Federal Court, the senator's suspension was once again determined, along with the imposition of precautionary measures such as nighttime confinement. The decision sparked an institutional crisis between the Legislative and Judicial branches, as the Senate refused to comply with the court order, voted on the suspension, and decided to overturn the Supreme Court's decision.

=== Accusation against Temer ===
On June 27, the Attorney General Rodrigo Janot accused Michel Temer of passive corruption, making him the first Brazilian president to be criminally charged while in office. The accusation refers to the delivery of a briefcase containing 500,000 reais in bribes from JBS to Rodrigo Rocha Loures. After being processed by a special committee, the accusation against Temer reached the plenary of the Chamber of Deputies. Thus, on August 2, after voting, the members of parliament denied authorization for the continuation of the accusation.

=== JBS Parliamentary Inquiry Commission ===
On September 5, 2017, the JBS Parliamentary Inquiry Commission was established with the purpose of investigating the loans granted by the BNDES to JBS between 2007 and 2016, as well as examining the terms and conditions of the group's plea agreements reached with the Office of the Prosecutor General and ratified by the Supreme Federal Court. However, the CPI was seen as a political maneuver aimed at pressuring the investigators of Operation Car Wash and shielding President Temer and his allies. The CPI spared the Brazilian political leadership and did not summon any of the politicians accused of receiving bribes from JBS. According to Senator Randolfe Rodrigues, "The outcome of the CPI was entirely predictable: it turned a blind eye to the dirty dealings of the Batista brothers, which involve members of both the previous and current governments, and dedicated itself to reversing the relationship between the accused and the accusers, opportunistically tarnishing the institute of plea bargains and putting Operation Car Wash in the dock."

=== Investigations ===
In February 2018, at the request of the Office of the Prosecutor General, the Supreme Federal Court (STF) opened an investigation into Gilberto Kassab, who was mentioned in Wesley Batista's plea agreement. According to Wesley, JBS allocated 350,000 reais per month in bribes to Yape Consultoria e Debates, a company connected to Kassab. The businessman claims to have made the payments because he believed that the former mayor's influence would be useful to him at some point.

On May 16, 2018, Minister Edson Fachin ordered the opening of an investigation to determine whether around 40 million reais were transferred from J&F to politicians of the MDB during the 2014 election campaign. According to the Attorney General, Raquel Dodge, the suspicions are based on the plea agreements of Sérgio Machado, former senator of the MDB and former president of Transpetro, and Ricardo Saud, former executive of J&F. The investigated politicians are Eduardo Braga, Vital do Rêgo, Jader Barbalho, Eunício Oliveira, Renan Calheiros, and Henrique Eduardo Alves.

== See also ==
- Plea agreements in Operation Car Wash
- International ramifications of Operation Car Wash
- Political crisis in Brazil since 2014
