= Passive corruption =

Passive corruption, in Brazilian criminal law, is one of the crimes committed by public officials against the general administration.

Corruption can be of two types:

- Active, referring to the briber; or
- Passive, referring to the corrupted public official.

Some legislations define both behaviors as being the same crime. In the case of the crime of corruption, Brazilian legislation adopted, exceptionally, the pluralistic theory, as it chose to define two different crimes: active corruption, in Article 333 of the Penal Code, and passive corruption, in Article 317.

== Definition ==
The Penal Code, in Article 317, defines the crime of passive corruption as "soliciting or receiving, for oneself or for others, directly or indirectly, even if outside the function or before assuming it, an undue advantage, or accepting a promise of such an advantage."

The crime known as passive corruption is practiced against public administration in general. Its provision is found in Article 317 of the Brazilian Penal Code, which characterizes it as the act in which the public official requests or receives, for oneself or for others, directly or indirectly, even if outside the function or before assuming it, an undue advantage, or accepts a promise of such an advantage. The peculiarity of this illicit act is that it is practiced solely and exclusively by the public official, even though the letter of the law does not explicitly define the active subject. This deduction arises from the chapter in which the article is inserted, the first (crimes committed by public officials against the administration in general) of Title XI (crimes against public administration). However, the article states in its text that even an agent who is outside the function or has not yet assumed it will be penalized.

For passive corruption, the penalty is imprisonment, from two to twelve years, and a fine. The penalty will be increased by one-third in the event that, as a result of the advantage or promise, the official delays or fails to perform any official act or performs it in violation of their duty. Passive corruption is one of the three forms that the crime called corruption can take. In addition to the passive form, we have active corruption.

The intention of the legislator in criminalizing passive corruption was to maintain the normal functioning of public administration in order to preserve principles intrinsic to the institution, such as legality or morality, thus preventing an implosion of the structure of public institutions in case corruption proliferates among its members.

Thus, from the legal provision, we can understand that the crime of passive corruption occurs when the public official solicits a bribe, advantage, or similar in order to do or refrain from doing something related to their function. It does not matter whether the individual agrees with the illicit act and gives what the corrupt agent asks for. The crime is already configured at the moment of solicitation of the thing or advantage. Furthermore, the act that the official performs or refrains from performing can be classified as illicit, illegitimate, or unjust, resulting in proper passive corruption. Now, when analyzing an act or the omission of an act that is legal and just, but benefits the public official themselves or another individual, we are faced with improper passive corruption. The other party can/must appeal to the police to arrest the criminal, but if they participate in the illicit act, active and passive corruption is established.

== Penalty ==
The penalty is two to twelve years of imprisonment, in addition to a fine. It can be increased by one-third if such an advantage entails some non-compliance with the duty of the official.

== Characteristics ==
It is a specific crime, that is, it can only be committed by someone who holds the status of a public official.

However, there may be the participation of individuals through inducement, incitement, or secondary assistance.

== Aggravating Factors ==
The penalty is aggravated "if, as a result of the advantage or promise, the official delays or fails to perform any official act or performs it in violation of their duty." If they only delay or fail to do what they should do, it is improper passive corruption. If they perform an act in violation of their duty, it is proper passive corruption.

If the public official holds a commission position or a management or advisory function, the penalty is also aggravated (Article 316, § 2, of the Penal Code).
