= National Beef =

Beef processor in Missouri, United States

National Beef Packing Company LLC
- Type: Private
- Industry: Meatpacking
- Founded: 1992; 34 years ago
- Headquarters: Kansas City, Missouri, United States
- Key people: Tim Klein (president & CEO)
- Products: Beef
- Revenue: ▲US$ 7.3 billion (2017)
- Number of employees: 8,200
- Parent: Marfrig (82%)
- Website: www.nationalbeef.com

National Beef Packing Company LLC is a beef processor headquartered in Kansas City, Missouri, United States, that produces fresh, chilled and further processed beef and beef by-products for customers worldwide. The company is owned by the Brazilian multinational Marfrig. Its main focuses include branded box beef, consumer ready beef, portion control beef and wet blue leather. The company is considered one of the modern "big four" beef packers in the United States.

== History ==
The modern history of National Beef can be traced back to 1992, when Farmland Industries purchased the National Beef Packing Company in Dodge City, Kansas. A year later, it purchased a location in Liberal, Kansas and named it Farmland National Beef LLC. In 1997, U.S. Premium Beef Ltd purchased a minority interest in National Beef. The company became jointly owned by Farmland Industries and U.S. Premium Beef Ltd. National Beef also purchased a majority interest in the Kansas City Steak Company. In 2001, National Beef began consumer-ready production at plants in Hummels Wharf, Pennsylvania and Moultrie, Georgia. In 2003, National Beef also became the fourth largest U.S. beef processor in 2003. U.S. Premium Beef Ltd purchased a majority interest along with a management group and Beef Products Inc. as minority investors, forming National Beef Packing Co. LLC.

In 2006, National Beef acquired Brawley Beef, LLC in Brawley, California. The Brawley plant was built in 2001 and could process more than 400,000 cattle per year. National Beef stated the purchase would allow them to create new relationships with producers and expand their presence in the western U.S. The Brawley plant was eventually closed in 2014. Three years later, National Beef acquired the Prime Tanning facility in St. Joseph, Missouri to form National Beef Leathers LLC. After the acquisition, the company said it would allow them to add significant value to the hides produced in their beef processing facilities. In 2011, Leucadia National Corporation purchased a majority stake in National Beef Packing Company. Five years later, National Beef announced plans to expand handling and shipping capacities to its Dodge City and Liberal, Kansas facilities. In 2018, Brazilian company Marfrig purchased a 51 percent majority stake in the company in April for $969 million. Through the purchase, a beef patty processing plant located in North Baltimore, Ohio, was added to National Beef's portfolio. One year later, National Beef acquired Iowa Premium, LLC, in Tama, Iowa.

== Sales & Operations ==
National Beef is the U.S.'s fourth largest beef processor, with sales exceeding $7 billion annually. National Beef products are available to national and regional retailers, including supermarket chains, independent grocers, club stores, wholesalers and distributors, foodservice providers and distributors, further processors and the U.S. military. U.S. operations include Liberal, Dodge City and Kansas City, Kansas; Hummels Wharf, Pennsylvania; Moultrie, Georgia; and St. Joseph, Missouri; with corporate headquarters in Kansas City, Missouri. National Beef maintains international offices in Chicago, Illinois; Tokyo; Seoul; and Hong Kong.

National Beef uses the BioLogic Food Safety System, a fully integrated system that includes training employees, interventions, a zone system and control and assessment functions. The company has also adopted the Global Food Safety Initiative (GFSI) audit criteria, a set of international food safety and quality standards. National Beef achieved accreditation through third party auditing by the British Retail Consortium (BRC).

== Products ==
=== Boxed Beef ===
National Beef is a processor and supplier of fresh, chilled and further processed beef for customers worldwide. Beef processing facilities are located in Liberal, Dodge City, Kansas, and Tama, Iowa.

=== Consumer Ready ===
Pre-trimmed product is sourced from beef processing facilities in Liberal and Dodge City, Kansas and then shipped to consumer ready facilities in Hummels Wharf, Pennsylvania and Moultrie, Georgia where overwrap and vacuum-sealed packaging are used on a variety of cuts for retail channels.

=== Branded Box Beef ===
National Beef has a variety of programs for a variety of beef needs including natural, Angus brands, and specialty brands such as Black Canyon Angus Beef, Hereford brands, NatureSource Natural Beef and HyPlains Heritage Farms.

=== Portion Control Beef ===
National Beef owns Kansas City Steak Company, which sells portioned beef to the foodservice and retail channels as well as to consumers through the Internet and direct mail.

=== Wet Blue Leather ===
National Beef operates the largest wet blue tannery in the world. Wet blue tanning refers to the first step in processing raw and brine-cured hides into tanned leather. From this facility in St. Joseph, Missouri, National Beef provides processed hides to finished leather processors worldwide for use in the automotive, luxury goods, apparel and furniture industries.

== Controversies ==
Between the years of 1991 and 1994, several accidental and unrelated employee deaths occurred. The company faced legal prosecution and the cases were resolved in settlements.

In 2012 National Beef was fined to failing to correctly pay livestock sellers. In 2014 National Beef was sued for failing to correctly compensate slaughterhouse workers. The suit was settled out of court.

On April 23, 2019, National Beef was named as a defendant in an anti-trust case against Beef Packers. In October 2020, the case was dismissed in U.S. district court.

In 2021 a Senate investigation found that 2,470 employees at National Beef become infected with COVID-19, 6 employees had died, and alleged that National Beef had conspired with other meatpacking companies to manufacture a false "protein supply crisis" to avoid extra safety measures.

In 2021 National Beef was sued for colluding with three other meatpackers to reduce the price paid to farmers for cattle and increasing prices to consumers. The lawsuit alleges that National Beef used cartel like tactics in coordination with JBS USA, Tyson Foods, and Cargill.

In 2022 Sysco sued National Beef alleging a similar price fixing scheme with other meatpackers.

In 2024, McDonald's Corporation sued JBS, National Beef, Cargill, and Tyson, along with their subsidiaries, for alleged price fixing.

== Recalls ==
In June 2013, the company recalled nearly 23,000 pounds of ground beef for a possible E. coli contamination.

On August 1, 2013, the company recalled 50,000 pounds of ground beef products because of possible E. coli contamination. All recalls were voluntary, and no illnesses were reported.

== See also ==
- Impact of the COVID-19 pandemic on the meat industry in the United States#National Beef
