= Sadia =

Brazilian processed food manufacturer

Sadia S.A.
- Type: Subsidiary
- Industry: Food processing
- Founded: 6 June 1944; 82 years ago
- Headquarters: Concórdia, Santa Catarina, Brazil
- Products: Food and beverage
- Revenue: ▲US$ 7.6 Billion (2008)
- Net income: ▼US$ 178.4 Million (2008)
- Number of employees: 60,580 (2008)
- Parent: BRF S.A.
- Website: www.sadia-life.com

Sadia S.A. is a major Brazilian food producer that has been a subsidiary of BRF S.A. since 2009. It is among the world's leading producers of frozen foods, and is Brazil's main exporter of meat-based products.

In Portuguese the word sadia means "healthy", but the name is also an abbreviation of "Sociedade Anônima Indústria e Comércio Concórdia", with the bold letters being the letters that compose the abbreviation.

Sadia was founded in Concórdia, Santa Catarina, Brazil, and has its headquarters there.

As of 2008, Sadia had about 20 industrial plants that together produced over 2.3 million tons of food including chicken, turkey, pork and beef, pasta, margarine, desserts, and other products. The company supplies over 70 thousand direct points of sale in Brazil and exports to over 100 countries.

Sadia's former chairman Luís Fernando Furlan was appointed Minister of Industry and Foreign Trade by president Luiz Inácio Lula da Silva in 2003.

In 2008, the company accrued enormous losses on the derivative market.

In 2009, the company announced a merger with its major competitor Perdigão, forming BRF - Brasil Foods (technically a takeover of Sadia by Perdigão, which already changed its corporate name to BRF - Brasil Foods S.A.).

In March 2017, BRF was revealed to have sold processed rotten meat, resulting in food scares and worldwide recalls.
