= Vigor S.A. =

Brazilian dairy company

Fábrica de Produtos Alimentícios Vigor S.A.
- Type: Subsidiary
- Industry: Food processing
- Founded: 1917; 109 years ago
- Headquarters: Buenos Aires, Argentina, São Paulo, Brazil
- Area served: Brazil
- Key people: Eduardo Martins dos Reis (chairman and CEO)
- Products: Milk and dairy products
- Revenue: ▲US$ 750 million (2018)
- Parent: Grupo Lala
- Subsidiaries: Dan Vigor
- Website: www.vigor.com.br

Fábrica de Produtos Alimentícios Vigor S.A., simply known as Vigor, is a Brazilian dairy and food company headquartered in São Paulo. It is the sixth largest dairy company in Brazil. The company is a subsidiary of Mexican dairy firm Grupo Lala.

Still specializing in UHT milk and milk derivatives (varieties of yogurt, cheese, butter, ice cream, etc.), the company also has an interest in fruit juices, pasta, sauce and vegetable fats and oils. These products are distributed under well-known brand names such as Vigor, Leco, Danubio, Faixa Azul, Serrabella, Amélia, Franciscano, Carmelita e Mesa.

Through association with JBS, which specializes in exports of meat and hides, the existing export markets various dairy products out of Brazil, such as cream cheese and curd, which are exported to Europe, Egypt, Angola, Cape Verde and Russia.

== Industrial units ==
Vigor has 7 industrial plants located in 4 Brazilian states, they are São Paulo, Minas Gerais, Paraná and Goiás, the industrial plants are located in:

- São Paulo - São Paulo
- São Caetano do Sul - São Paulo
- Cruzeiro - São Paulo
- Anápolis - Goiás
- Lavras - Minas Gerais
- São Gonçalo do Sapucaí - Minas Gerais
- Santo Inácio - Paraná

== Competitors ==
The company is the sixth largest milk producer company in Brazil, and have many major competitors such as the Brazilians LBR - Lácteos Brasil, BRF and multinationals such as Nestlé, Danone and Parmalat.
