= Perdigão S.A. =

Brazilian food producer

- Company type: Subsidiary
- Industry: Food Processing
- Founded: 1934; 92 years ago
- Headquarters: Videira, Santa Catarina, Brazil
- Key people: Nildemar Secches (CEO)
- Products: Food and Beverage
- Revenue: ▲US$ 8.4 Billion (2008)
- Net income: ▼US$ 91.6 Million (2008)
- Number of employees: 45,000 (2008)
- Parent: BRF S.A.
- Subsidiaries: Batavo
- Website: www.perdigao.com.br

Perdigão S.A. is Brazilian food producer founded in 1934 in the state of Santa Catarina in southern Brazil. In 2009, the company announced a merger with competitor Sadia, forming BRF S.A.
