= J&F Investimentos =

Largest business group in Brazil

J&F S.A.
- Company type: Sociedade Anônima
- Industry: Conglomerate
- Founded: 1953; 73 years ago
- Headquarters: São Paulo, São Paulo, Brazil
- Area served: Worldwide
- Key people: Antonio Batista Costa (CEO)
- Products: Food and beverages, Financial services, Media, Electricity, Consumer goods, Retail, Manufacturing
- Revenue: ▲US$ 90.7 billion
- Owner: Batista family
- Number of employees: 300,000
- Subsidiaries: JBS S.A.; Banco Original; Flora S.A.; Âmbar
- Website: jfsa.com.br

J&F S.A. is a private investment holding company that was founded in 1953 and is based in São Paulo, Brazil. The company is involved in myriad business endeavors, such as agribusiness, manufacturing, marketing and sales, electricity generation, waste management, real estate, and publishing, among others. J&F Investimentos is owned by the Batista family.

In 2020, the company pleaded guilty to charges in the U.S. of paying nearly US$180 million in bribes to Brazilian officials.

== Overview ==
J&F Investimentos is in part a large agribusiness company that is involved in all aspects of the purveyance of beef, pork, poultry, and sheep food commodities, including animal rearing, slaughter, refrigeration, processing, marketing, sales and delivery. J&F Investimentos owns JBS S.A., which is the largest meatpacker in the world. The company also manufactures and purveys food products such as dairy, pasta and noodles, vegetable oils, yogurt, juices, sugarcane and cereal crops, and animal feed.

The company is also involved in the manufacture and purveyance of aluminum cans, plastic resins, biodiesel, various leather products, cleaning and hygiene products, and glycerin. Additional company business and endeavors are myriad, and includes the purchasing and selling of various products such as palm oil, tallow and soy grains, electricity generation from biomass, pulp production and distribution, industrial waste management, consulting services, real estate acquisitions, sales and leasing, publishing agribusiness information, and several other activities.

Henrique Meirelles, Brazil's former Minister of Finance, was chairman of the company from 2012 to 2016.

In 2017, the company agreed to pay a US$3.2 billion fine for its role in a corruption scandal.

In 2020, the company pleaded guilty to charges in the U.S. of paying nearly US$180 million in bribes to Brazilian officials in exchange for state-backed financing used to purchase companies such as meatpacking corporations Swift & Company and Pilgrim’s Pride.

In 2022, it established J&F Mineração and acquired the Centro Oeste System from Vale S.A., a system that produced, in 2021, 2.7 million tons of iron ore and 200,000 tons of manganese ore, and includes Mineração Corumbaense Reunida (MCR ) and comprises the mines of Urucum and Morraria Santa Cruz, in Corumbá, Mato Grosso do Sul.

=== Subsidiaries ===
Alpargatas S.A., the largest footwear company in Brazil and manufacturer of Havaianas flip-flop sandals, is a subsidiary of J&F Investimentos. As of August, 2016, J&F Investimentos owned 6.99% of the common shares of Alpargatas. In 2016, Brazil's audit court began investigation into a loan from Caixa Economica Federal to J&F Investimentos which was used to finance the company's acquisition of Alpargatas. Investigators asserted that the timing of the loan and its terms, which included a seven-year repayment period and two-year grace period, provided the company with an unfair advantage "over rival bidders because it allowed the company to pay entirely upfront in cash". Investigators also asserted that per the substantial amount of the loan, it should have been syndicated to other banks.

Eldorado Brasil is a subsidiary of J&F Investimentos that is involved in pulp production; J&F Investimentos is its parent company.

Vigor S.A. is a Brazilian dairy and food company that was a subsidiary of J&F Investimentos. In 2017, the company sold its dairy firm to the Mexican dairy company Grupo Lala.

== Ownership ==
J&F Investimentos is owned by the Batista family of Brazil, and serves as the family's investment holding company. The Batista family has stated that it plans to someday convert the company into a publicly traded investment company.
