= Seara Foods =

Brazilian food processing company

Seara Alimentos Ltda.
- Company type: Subsidiary
- Industry: Food processing
- Founded: November 18, 1956; 69 years ago
- Headquarters: Seara, Santa Catarina, Brazil
- Area served: Worldwide
- Key people: Joanita Karoleski (CEO)
- Products: Foods
- Revenue: ▲US$ 5.5 billion (2018)
- Number of employees: 65,000
- Parent: JBS
- Website: www.searafoodsme.com

Seara Foods Ltda. is a Brazilian food processing company. It specializes in the development and distribution of meat products. The company was founded on November 18, 1956, in the town of Seara, Santa Catarina, Brazil.

The company became the largest exporter of chicken in the country thanks to export its business of meat and poultry products to other continents like Europe, Asia, Middle East and the Far East. In turn, the company specialized in Brazilian and Latin American market with products such as sausage, bacon, hamburgers, ham, bologna and ready meals among others. In 2009, the Brazilian multinational corporation Marfrig Group acquired the company from Cargill Inc. and in 2013 Marfrig sold Seara Brasil (part of Seara Foods) to JBS the global protein leader which became #1 Poultry producer in the World and #1 Beef producer in the World.

Seara is also known for its sponsorship of sporting events. The company was a sponsor of the Santos Futebol Clube and the Brazil national football team. In 2010, it was one of the official sponsors of the World Cup 2010 held in South Africa, and in 2011 is sponsoring the 2011 Copa América, which takes place in Argentina.

Seara is former subsidiary of Marfrig sale to JBS in 2013. Since 2013, Seara has constantly growing and became a Leading producer of prepared foods and fresh & frozen poultry products with products present in more than 150 countries.
