= Marfrig =

Brazilian food processing company

Marfrig Global Foods S.A.
- Type: Public
- Traded as: B3: MRFG3
- Industry: Food Processing
- Founded: May 23, 2000; 26 years ago
- Headquarters: São Paulo, Brazil
- Key people: Marcos Antonio Molina dos Santos (CEO)
- Products: Foods & Beverages
- Revenue: ▲US$ 24.5 billion (2024)
- Net income: ▲US$ 804.5 million (2024)
- Number of employees: 40,200
- Subsidiaries: National Beef Packing Company; BRF
- Website: www.marfrig.com

Marfrig S.A. is the second largest Brazilian food processing company, after JBS. The company is headquartered in São Paulo. The company has 33 production units around the world and operational bases in 22 countries, exporting their products to over 100. Its activities include the production, processing, industrialization, sale and distribution of food based on animal protein, in addition to the sale of other food byproducts, such as frozen vegetables, sauces and desserts. The company is one of the largest beef producers in the world.

== Group activities ==
Marfrig employs approximately 40,000 people and operates an extensive network of industrial, processing and commercial facilities across several continents. Its operations include 33 cattle-processing plants, located in Brazil (24), Argentina (5) and Uruguay (4); 21 poultry-processing units, with 14 in Brazil, four in Europe and three in the United States; and four pork-processing facilities in Brazil.

The group also maintains two turkey-processing plants, one in Brazil and one in Europe, as well as five lamb-processing facilities distributed across Brazil, Uruguay and Chile. In addition, Marfrig operates 48 plants dedicated to processed and value-added products, located in Brazil, Argentina, Uruguay, the United States, China, Thailand, Malaysia, South Korea, Australia and several European countries.

Supporting its livestock and poultry operations, the company owns 27 feed mills producing feed for chickens, turkeys and pigs, including 21 in Brazil, three in Europe and three in the United States. It also operates two trading companies, located in Chile and the United Kingdom, and maintains 14 leather-processing and commercial units distributed across Brazil, Uruguay, China, Germany, the United States, Argentina, Mexico and South Africa.

According to company data, its daily processing capacity reaches approximately 31,200 cattle, 10,400 pigs, 10,400 sheep, 350,000 turkeys and 3.7 million chickens. The company also reports an installed capacity of around 126,000 tonnes of processed products and the processing of more than 178,500 leather hides per month.

In June 2010, Marfrig announced the acquisition of Keystone Foods, a supplier of processed meat products to McDonald's and other food-service companies. In 2018, Marfrig sold Keystone to Tyson Foods.

== Attention from institutional investors due to Amazon rainforest destruction ==
Marfrig Global Foods's beef exports has repeatedly implicated in illegal deforestation, as well as indigenous land rights violations and slave labour according to the environmental watchdog Forests and Finance. It has previously been identified as having a problematic beef supply chain fuelling the deforestation of the Amazon forest. The deforestation free supply chain watchdog Forest 500 further identified Marfrig's commitments as being insufficient, with a commitment strength of 9/20 In February 2022, IDB Invest, the private-sector arm of the Inter-American Development Bank shelved a US$200 million loan to Marfrig Global Foods over the group's deforestation impact.

On 21. December 2021 the Government Pension Fund of Norway placed Marfrig under observation "due to risk that the company contributes to serious environmental damage".

== Sponsorship activities ==
The company was a sponsor of the 2010 and 2014 FIFA World Cups, the latter held in Marfrig's home country of Brazil.

== See also ==
- Impact of the 2019–20 coronavirus pandemic on the meat industry in the United States
