= Active corruption =

Active corruption consists of the act of offering (this offering can be done in various ways) an advantage, any kind of benefit, or satisfaction of will that may affect the morality of Public Administration. It is only characterized when the advantage is offered to a public official. If there is a request (passive corruption) or imposition (extortion) by the official for the offered advantage, the act of yielding to this request or pressure through payment does not constitute active corruption, since the penal code only includes the verb "offer".

There is no negligent form for active corruption; it requires the intent of the individual to corrupt the public agent.

Qualified form - due to the offering, the official actually delays or omits an official act, or performs an act in violation of their duty. Note that if there is effective action, but not an official act, the assigned type will be in the main provision and not in the qualified form.

Active corruption, committed by an outsider, who offers or promises an undue advantage, is provided for in Article 333 of the Brazilian Penal Code. Active corruption was the subject of studies and criticisms even by Islamic theology in the Middle Ages.
