= Grupo Lala =

Mexican food processing company

Grupo Lala, S.A.B. de C.V.
- Trade name: Grupo Lala
- Formerly: Pasteurizadora La Laguna
- Type: Private
- Industry: Food processing
- Founded: 17 April 1950; 76 years ago
- Headquarters: Gómez Palacio, Durango, Mexico
- Area served: Latin America and the United States
- Key people: Francisco Camacho Beltrán (CEO); Salvador Alfaro (CFO); Eduardo Tricio Haro (President)
- Products: Milk, juice, cream, desserts, cheese, yogurt, butter and processed meats
- Total assets: 4.5 billion USD (2022)
- Owner: Tricio Family
- Number of employees: 39,953 (2022)
- Subsidiaries: Borden; Lala US; Vigor
- Website: www.grupolala.com

Grupo Lala is a Mexican food processing company founded in 1949 in Torreón, Coahuila. The company is headquartered in Gómez Palacio, Durango. Together with its acquisition of Dairy Farmers of America subsidiary National Dairy (of which it owns 87.5%) is one of the largest dairy companies in the world.

== History ==
The company was founded in 1949 in Torreón, Coahuila. It expanded into the United States in 2008, acquiring a manufacturing plant in Omaha, Nebraska, and in 2009, LALA acquired National Dairy, Farmland Dairies and Promised Land. The company's Chairman is Eduardo Tricio Haro and the CEO is Francisco Camacho Beltrán (former Danone Senior Executive). LALA is now the largest dairy company in Latin America. The company name makes reference to its origin "La Laguna", a region located in Northern Mexico where the Mayran Lagoon is located.

Grupo Lala was listed 12th in Dairy Foods magazine's list of the top 100 North American dairies. It was the only dairy from Mexico to be listed in the top 100.

Grupo Lala purchased National Dairy from Dairy Farmers of America, Inc. (DFA), in 2009.

In 2009, Grupo Lala purchased National Dairy Holdings L.P. from the Dairy Farmers of America. In 2011, Grupo Lala spun off its American operations under the name Laguna Dairy (now Borden Milk Products). In 2016, Grupo Lala reacquired three plants from Laguna Dairy and reentered the United States.

In November 2014, Grupo Lala entered the processed meat segment with the introduction of Nutri Deli, this was followed by Lala Plenia in 2021.

In August 2017, Grupo Lala agreed to acquire Brazilian dairy firm Vigor, and its stake in Itambé for BRL 5.725 billion (US$1.84 billion).

== Marketing ==
=== Yogurting campaign ===
In early 2016, LALA U.S. launched its first nationwide advertising campaign to promote its drinkable yogurt smoothie products. The campaign uses the hashtag "#yogurting" in television and internet ads, as well as in social media.

The launch included the introduction of LALA Greek Yogurt Smoothies plus three new LALA Yogurt Smoothie flavors: cherry vanilla, pomegranate blueberry and vanilla almond cereal. That's in addition to the LALA Yogurt Smoothies 14 original flavors.

LALA Yogurt Smoothies are available at various retailers across the country including Walmart, Albertson's Safeway, Publix, HEB, ShopRite and others. LALA has targeted a demographic called "Shapers On the Go" who value health and convenience. About 60% of the target audience is made up of millennials.

On Feb. 23, 2016, LALA Yogurt Smoothies were featured as the sponsor of a comedy sketch on Jimmy Kimmel Live, in which Jimmy's sidekick Guillermo Rodriguez is tricked into jumping over a pit of live snakes.

On March 4, 2016, LALA Yogurt Smoothies were the commercial sponsors of another well-received comedy skit, this time on Conan featuring Conan's prop Master Bill Tull.

LALA was also the featured sponsor for a game sketch called "View Your Tune" in March on ABC's The VIew. The segment was hosted by Paul Shaffer.

== Brands ==
Lala; Yomi Lala; Peti Zoo; Bio4; Lalacult; Nutri; NutriDeli; Los Volcanes; Monarca; Mileche; Plenia	Boreal; Break; Bio Balance; Siluette; Natural'es; Las Puentes; Borden; Bell (Lala has a minority stake); Vigor	United States	
Lala; Yomi Lala; Peti Zoo; Bio4; Lalacult; Nutri; NutriDeli; Los Volcanes; Monarca; Mileche; Plenia	Boreal; Break; Bio Balance; Siluette; Natural'es; Las Puentes; Borden; Bell (Lala has a minority stake); Vigor	Borden (Texas, Louisiana); Coburg Dairy (South Carolina); Cream O'Weber (Utah); Dairy Fresh (Louisiana, Alabama, Mississippi); Dairymens (Ohio); Farmland (New Jersey); Clinton; Special Request; Welsh Farms	Flav-O-Rich (Kentucky); Gilsa Dairy (Nebraska); Frusion; La Creme; Goldenrod (Kentucky); Meyer Dairy (Cincinnati); Promised Land (Texas); Sinton's (Colorado); Velda Farms (Florida)

== Factories ==
- Tijuana, Baja California
- Torreón, Coahuila
- Monterrey, Nuevo León
- Guadalajara, Jalisco
- Mexico City
- Irapuato, Guanajuato
- Mazatlán, Sinaloa
- Veracruz, Veracruz
- Acapulco, Guerrero
