= Securities Commission (Brazil) =

Securities and exchange commission of Brazil

Securities and Exchange Commission of Brazil
- Comissão de Valores Mobiliários

Agency overview
- Formed: December 1976
- Jurisdiction: Federative Republic of Brazil
- Headquarters: Rio de Janeiro, Brazil
- Employees: 450
- Agency executive: Maria Helena Santana, Chairperson
- Website: http://www.cvm.gov.br

The Securities and Exchange Commission of Brazil (CVM; Portuguese: Comissão de Valores Mobiliários) is the securities market authority in Brazil. It regulates the capital markets in Brazil and all of its participants. This includes stock exchanges, public companies, financial intermediaries and investors. It is an independent agency linked to the Ministry of Finance (Brazil)

== History ==
The CVM was established on 7 December 1976, with the passing of the Brazilian legislation Law (6385/76). The CVM responsibilities and powers have been expanded since by Law No. 6422 of 8 June 1977, Law No. 9457 of 5 May 1997, Law No. 10303 of 31 October 2001, Decree No. 3995 of 31 October 2001, Law No. 10,411 of 26 February 2002. In addition the CVM also performs duties under the corporation act as part of Law (6404/76)

On Dec 7 2009, CVM enacted a new regulation to enhance the information provided to investors by companies issuing securities in line with International Organization of Securities Commissions guidelines.

== Objectives ==
The CVM has the following objectives:

- to assure the proper functioning of the exchange and over-the-counter markets,
- to protect securities holders against fraudulent issues and illegal actions,
- to protect consumers against fraud and market manipulation,
- to make sure that markets are transparent and companies disclose all relevant information,
- to make sure that all market participants adopt fair trading practices, and
- to promote investment in financial markets and increase the capitalization of Brazilian publicly held companies.

== Responsibilities ==
To meet the objectives, the CVM

- Supervises all market participants and has the power to set rules and discipline participants as well as license financial intermediaries,
- Runs a register of all publicly held companies and makes sure that those companies adhere to listing rules, and
- Sets the rules for securities trading on the stock exchanges and can suspend or cancel trading, issuance or distribution of securities and if necessary suspend stock exchange operations.

CVM also has the jurisdiction to establish, prosecute and punish irregularities committed in the market. If it has any suspicion CVM can start an investigation, through which it may collects information, take testimony and evidence in order to clearly the identify of the person responsible of illegal practices. If the CVM charges any individuals or companies they have full rights of defense in court.

The CVM is responsible for regulating the B3 stock exchange, the largest stock exchange in South America and the 13th largest in the world.

== Structure ==
The CVM is headquartered in Rio de Janeiro and has two regional offices in São Paulo and Brasília. It is managed by a board composed of a chairperson and four commissioners, all appointed by the President of Brazil. The board designs policies and general guidelines to be followed by the chief staff members. The CVM is run day to day by a chief executive officer (CEO), who is appointed by the chairperson, and who coordinates all staff activities of the CVM.

Current Board members are:

- Leonardo P. Gomes Pereira (chairperson)
- Otavio Yazbek
- Gustavo Tavares Borba
- Ana Dolores Moura Carneiro de Novaes
- Roberto Tadeu Antunes Fernandes

== See also ==
- Securities Commission
- List of financial supervisory authorities by country
