= Wesley Batista =

Brazilian billionaire businessman

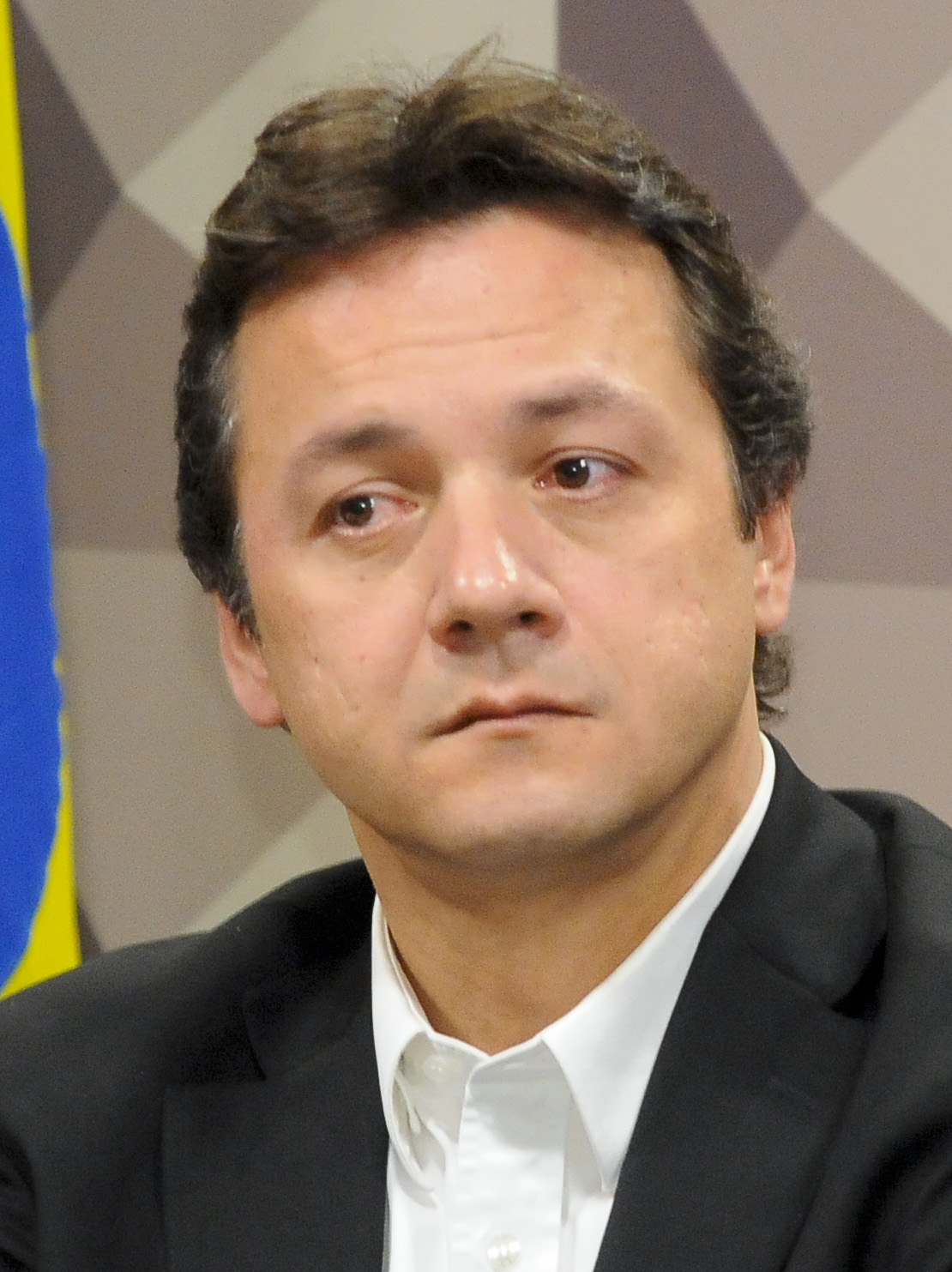
- Batista in 2017
- Born: Wesley Mendonça Batista; 8 December 1972 (age 53); Goiás, Brazil
- Occupation: Businessman
- Spouse: Alessandra Meireles Garcia Batista
- Children: 3
- Relatives: Joesley Batista (brother)

Wesley Mendonça Batista (born 8 December 1972) is a Brazilian billionaire businessman, and founder of JBS S.A. Batista was the president of the JBS group and was responsible for the implementation of JBS operations in the US since the acquisition of Swift in 2007.

== Career ==
=== JBS president ===
Wesley Batista and his brother Joesley Batista were listed in 2016 among the top 70 billionaires of Brazil by Forbes magazine.

=== 2016: Operation Car-Wash ===
In July 2016, Wesley Batista became a suspect in the investigations of Operation Car Wash. The Brazilian Federal Police charged him with alleged bribes made by his company, JBS S.A., to former president of the Brazilian parliament Eduardo Cunha, intended to help JBS free up resources from the Fundo de Investimento do Fundo de Garantia do Tempo de Serviço (FI-FGTS).

=== 2017: Bribery and insider trading allegations ===
On 17 May 2017, the Batista brothers admitted to the Brazilian Federal Police that they had bribed several Brazilian officers and politicians over the previous 12 years. As a result of these bribes, he and his company JBS allegedly obtained funding from the BNDES of over R$10 billion at below market rates, and then used the funds to bribe politicians. In return for their cooperation, the Brazilian Federal Police set Batista, his brother and other directors of JBS S.A. free of charges, with a fine of R$225 million.

Prior to the release of the recordings, Batista and his brother Joesley Batista sold several shares of JBS S.A. and bought over USD 1 billion. The release of the recordings caused a sharp drop in the stock price of JBS S.A. shares and in the value in the Brazilian Real. The Brazilian Securities Commission ("CVM") is investigating the Batista brothers for insider trading. Batista decided to move to the US.

== Personal life ==
Batista is married, with three children, and lives in São Paulo, Brazil.
