= BRF S.A. =

Brazilian food processing company

- Formerly: Perdigão S.A. (1934–2009); BRF - Brasil Foods S.A. (2009–2013)
- Type: Subsidiary
- Traded as: B3: BRFS3; NYSE: BRFS
- Industry: Food processing
- Founded: August 18, 1934; 92 years ago
- Headquarters: Itajaí, Santa Catarina, Brazil
- Area served: Worldwide
- Key people: Lorival Nogueira Luz Jr. (CEO); Pedro Parente (chairman)
- Products: Meats; Ultra-processed food Margarines; Pasta; Pizzas; Frozen vegetables
- Revenue: ▲US$ 10.8 billion (2023)
- Net income: ▼US$ 343.0 million (2023)
- Owner: MBRF
- Number of employees: over 100,000
- Subsidiaries: OneFoods
- Website: brf-global.com

BRF S.A. is a Brazilian food processing company with a portfolio of more than 30 brands, including Sadia, Perdigão, Qualy, Paty, Dánica, and Bocatti. Its products are marketed in over 150 countries across five continents. The company employs more than 100,000 people and operates around 50 production facilities in eight countries: Argentina, Brazil, the United Arab Emirates, the Netherlands, Malaysia, the United Kingdom, Thailand, and Turkey.

BRF was formed through the merger of two of Brazil’s largest food companies, Sadia and Perdigão. The merger was announced in 2009 and completed on July 13, 2013, following approval by Brazil’s antitrust authority, the Administrative Council for Economic Defense (CADE). After the merger, Sadia and Perdigão ceased to operate as independent companies and were retained as brands within BRF’s portfolio.

In September 2025, BRF completed the merger of its operations with Marfrig, a major São Paulo-based food company, creating a new entity known as MBRF Global Foods Company.

== History ==
The negotiation for the acquisition of Sadia by Perdigão started in 2008, with then-president José Antonio do Prado Fay. The successful merger, officially announced in May 2009, created BRF, which continued under Fay's lead.

In October 2011, BRF made two acquisitions in Argentina, acquiring the companies Avex (a poultry company) and Dánica (a leading company in the production of margarine) for 150 million dollars.

One year later, in Abu Dhabi, BRF acquired 49% of the food distribution company Federal Foods, for 36 million dollars.

In 2012, once the merger process between Perdigão and Sadia was concluded, the company (which was then called BRF Brasil Foods) became one of the biggest food companies in the world.

In the following year, to consolidate as a global brand, the company changed its name to BRF S.A. Since then, the company has presented itself to the market as BRF. While keeping up with the changes within the company, The company's logo was redesigned after two years of research among strategic audiences, accomplished with the help of consulting agencies Interbrand and A10.

In April 2013, entrepreneur Abilio Diniz was elected as the new president of BRF's Administrative Council. He boosts the plan for internal changes. After four months, Claudio Galeazzi occupies José Antonio do Prado Fay's position, becoming the company's CEO. Galeazzi repeats with Abilio Diniz a partnership that lasted years, similar to other companies where Diniz was in charge (like Grupo Pão de Açúcar, for instance).

In May 2013, Sadia officially announces its support of the Olympic Games and Paralympic Rio 2016 Games. From June 2013 to January 2016, the brand was also a sponsor for Brazil's National Soccer Team. The contract included the main team and all other categories. The numbers of the deal were not published.

In April 2014, another slice of Federal Foods is acquired by close to US$27.8 million; in August of that same year, BRF incorporates Alyasra Food Company, a frozen food distributor from Kuwait, for 160 million dollars. With those acquisitions, the company expands its operations in the Middle East and follows through with its plan to become more international.

In September 2014, BRF sold its dairy assets to the French group Lactalis for R$1.8 billion. Among the sold assets are brands such as Batavo, Cotochés, and Elegê. According to BRF, the decision of selling the dairy division was a consequence of the low return the company was getting from it. In that same month, Claudio Galeazzi announced he is leaving the group's presidency and the executive Pedro Faria takes his place, effective January 2015.

In 2015, BRF became the first Brazilian company to invest in offering Green Bonds, which are debt securities that come with a guarantee that all resources collected will be invested in environmentally responsible projects. In that year, 50.2% of BRF's income came from the international market (export).

Following through with the strategic plan of turning the company global, during that same year, in Asia, SATS BRF was created in Singapore; in China, BRF launched a line of snacks with the Sadia brand; in the Middle East, Qatar National Import and Export (QNIE) was partially acquired; in Argentina, they acquired iconic brands such as Vieníssima (sausages), Goodmark (hamburgers) and Manty and Delícia (margarine) through the Avex and QuickFood subsidiaries.

Back in Brazil, still in 2015, Perdigão went back to acting in strategic categories (ham and smoked sausage amongst others) after being away from the market for three years, as agreed with the CADE during the Sadia and Perdigão merger.

In 2016, the Sadia Halal subsidiary was created, which manages the assets related to producing, distributing, and selling food to Muslim markets. A deal was made with FFM Berhad as well, ensuring the cooperation between the two companies with FFM Further Processing SDN BHD ("FFP"), a food processing company based out of Malaysia. Also in 2016, BRF sealed an investing deal with COFCO Meat, a Chinese food producer focused on swine, with vertically integrated operations in all chains of that industry segment.

At the beginning of 2017, BRF launched OneFoods, its subsidiary focused on the halal market. Headquartered in Dubai, UAE, OneFoods entered the market as the world's largest halal animal protein company. It expanded into Turkey, the world's largest consumer of halal chicken, by taking over Banvit, the country's largest poultry producer and market leader.

In 2021, BRF started to invest in cultured meat research through Aleph Farms, expecting to bring it to market by 2024.

In February 2023, BRF hired Banco Satander to advise on a potential sale of its pet food operations through a competitive process. In November 2023, the company ended the sale process and decided to retain the business, stating that it would continue expanding distribution, strengthening its pet food brands and pursuing export growth.

In September 2025, the firm completed the merger of its operations with those of Marfrig, forming a new entity called MBRF Global Foods Company.

== Investors ==
In 2015, it was one of the ten companies from Brazil that were chosen to be a part of the Euronext-Vigeo EM 70, a European stock exchange index that includes companies from developing countries that have high performance in corporate governance.

== Controversies ==
In June 2025, BRF faced strong public backlash following the death of twin babies of a pregnant employee inside one of its facilities in Brazil. The employee was a Venezuelan immigrant. According to several media outlets, including Infobae, the woman went into labor during her work shift but was allegedly not allowed to leave the premises to seek medical assistance. As a result, she gave birth inside the office, where the newborns died shortly after. The incident sparked public outrage and renewed criticism of the company's labor policies, particularly regarding the protection of pregnant employees and working conditions at its facilities.
