= Joesley Batista =

Brazilian businessman

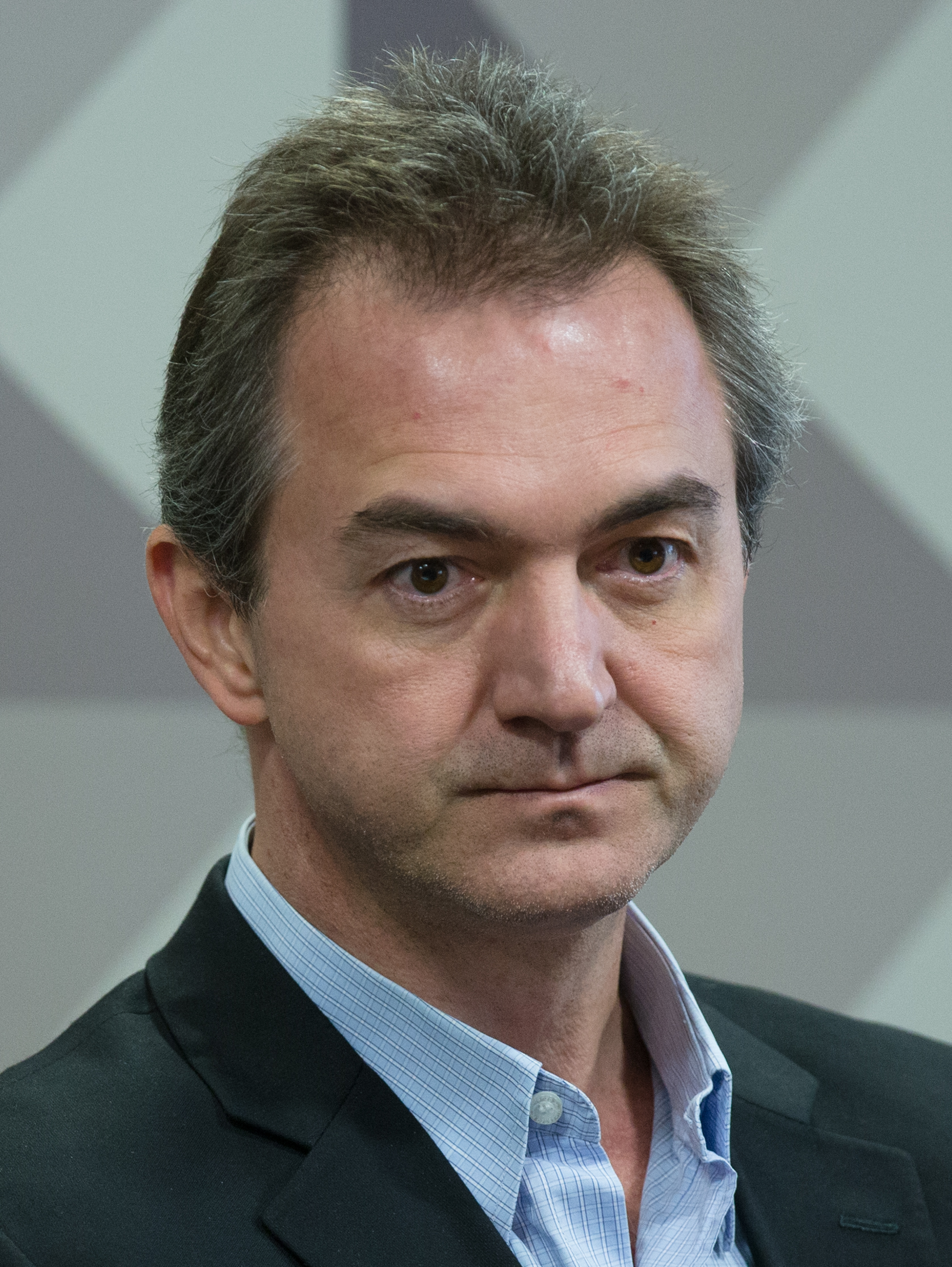
- Born: 5 February 1972 (age 54); Formosa, Goiás, Brazil
- Occupation: Businessman
- Organization: J&F Investimentos
- Spouse: Ticiana Villas Boas (m. 2012)
- Relatives: Wesley Batista (brother)

Joesley Mendonça Batista (born 5 February 1972) is a Brazilian businessman and son of José Batista Sobrinho. He is responsible for the expansion and internationalization process of JBS S.A., the largest meat-packing company in the world, and one of the main agribusiness companies in Brazil, and J&F Investimentos which he shares with his wife, Flora, and five children. As of October 2021, his net worth was estimated at US$4.1 billion.

== Early life ==
He is the son of José Batista Sobrinho, who founded JBS S.A., the largest meat-packing company in the world, and one of the main agribusiness companies in Brazil, and J&F Investimentos. José is married to Flora Mendonça Batista, and their children include: Valere Batista Mendonça Ramos, Vanessa Mendonça Batista, Wesley Mendonça Batista, Joesley Mendonça Batista and Vivianne Mendonça Batista.

== Career ==
He was listed in 2016 among the 70 main billionaires of Brazil by Forbes magazine.

== Corruption and influence peddling ==
Batista and his company are involved and pled guilty in several allegations of bribery. From September 2017 to October 2018, the Brazilian court kept Batista on remand for illegal profit on the financial market.

=== Operation Car-Wash ===
In July 2016, Batista was included as a suspect in the investigations of Operation Car Wash. The Brazilian Federal Police (in Portuguese, Polícia Federal or PF) charged him for alleged bribes made by his company, JBS S.A., to the former president of the Brazilian parliament Eduardo Cunha. The bribes were paid for the liberation of resources from the Fundo de Investimento do Fundo de Garantia do Tempo de Serviço (FI-FGTS).

=== Temer bribery ===
On 17 May 2017, the newspaper O Globo published news that Batista provided recordings made on 7 March 2017 of a dialogue between him and the Brazilian president Michel Temer, where Batista represents that he was paying for the silence of Eduardo Cunha, who is currently in jail, and former target in the investigation. The news resulted in some protests and calls for Temer's resignation, with the Brazilian stock market also facing a drop. On 19 May 2017, JBS admitted to paying bribes to the three Brazilian presidents Michel Temer, Dilma Rousseff and Luiz Inácio Lula da Silva, spanning the previous 14 years. All three presidents denied accepting bribes. However, an audio recording appears to catching Temer green-lighting the Batistas to pay a monthly allowance to former House Speaker Eduardo Cunha in exchange for his silence. JBS told prosecutors they had paid a total of $123 million in bribes to Brazilian politicians in recent years. Batista was also rumoured to have recorded senator and former presidential candidate Aécio Neves of PSDB, one of the biggest political parties at the time, requesting two million reais in bribes. The PF filmed the payment passing to the senator's cousin. The money was then tracked to the bank account of a company belonging to Zeze Perrella, a PSDB senator from Minas Gerais. The former head of the Securities Commission (CVM) referred to testimony that asserted JBS had bribed 1,829 politicians. Temer alleged that JBS doctored the recording of him talking to Batista about trading shares, and accused the Batista of insider trading. JBS denied illegal trades.

Batista and JBS allegedly obtained funding from the BNDES as a result of this bribe of over R$10 billion at below-market interest rates. In return for his help making the recording, the PF set Batista, his brother and other directors of JBS S.A. free, with a penalty of R$225 million. Batista thereupon decided to move to the US. The agreement obtained by the Batista brothers applies only to their physical persons. The Brazilian authorities are still negotiating the penalty to be applied to J&F, the holding company superior to JBS S.A. Prior negotiations suggested that a penalty close to R$11 billion, an amount that was refused by Batista. As of 22 May CVM was demanding $3.4 billion from JBS as part of a promised leniency deal, according to the press. In May 2017, JBS retained law firm Baker McKenzie to negotiate possible criminal charges with the United States Department of Justice under the Foreign Corrupt Practices Act.

=== Insider trading investigation ===
Prior to the release of the recordings, Batista and his brother Wesley Batista sold several shares of JBS S.A. and bought over USD 1 billion. The release of the recordings resulted in substantial reduction of the stock price of JBS S.A. shares and in the reduction of the value in the Brazilian Real. The CVM is investigating the Batista brothers for insider trading.

=== Prison ===
On 10 September 2017 he was temporarily arrested by the PF at the request of Attorney General Rodrigo Janot. The request was accepted by Federal Supreme Court Justice Edson Fachin.

On 13 September 2017, he had the remand ordered by the 6th Criminal Federal Court of São Paulo by the use of insider information to profit in the financial market between April and 17 May 2017, the date of disclosure of information relating to the collaboration agreement signed between J&F executives and the Attorney General's Office.

On 9 March 2018, Mr. Batista was released from the Federal Police's jail in Sao Paulo, but he is not allowed to leave the country and his passport is retained by the Federal Police.

== Personal life ==
Batista married television presenter Ticiana Villas Boas at JBS's head office in São Paulo, with performances by Brazilian pop stars Ivete Sangalo and Bruno & Marrone.
