= List of people from Rio de Janeiro =

Cariocas, as the people who are born in Rio de Janeiro are called in Brazil, have made extensive contributions to Brazil's (and the world's) history, culture, music, literature, education, science and technology, particularly when Rio de Janeiro was the federal capital and a great hub of Brazilian growth and innovation in all these areas. Some famous cariocas, who were born in Rio, are:

== A ==
- Leny Andrade (1943–2023), singer.
- Marcelo Costa de Andrade (born 1967), serial killer.
- Joaquim Pedro de Andrade (1932–1988), film director.
- Ana Paula Araújo (born 1972), journalist.
- Taís Araújo (born 1978), actress.
- Viviane Araújo (born 1975), model and actress.
- Ricardo Arona (born 1978), MMA fighter.
- Artur Avila (born 1979), mathematician.

== B ==
- Morena Baccarin (born 1979), actress.
- Marcia Barbosa (born 1960), physicist.
- Bruno Barreto (born 1955), film director.
- Vitor Belfort (born 1977), jiu-jitsu/MMA fighter.
- Jorge Ben (born 1939), singer and composer.
- Eloisa Biasotto Mano (1924–2019), chemist, professor.
- Luiz Bonfá (1922–2001), composer.
- Sagramor de Scuvero Brandão (1921–1995), actress and radio personality.
- Loalwa Braz (1953–2017), late lead singer.
- Chico Buarque (born 1944), composer, singer and writer.
- Murilo Bustamante (born 1966), mixed martial artist.

== C ==
- L. C. Cameron, biochemist
- Fernando Henrique Cardoso (born 1931), sociologist, twice president of Brazil.
- Waldemar Levy Cardoso (1900–2009), field marshal.
- Cartola (1908–1980), composer and singer.
- Marco Castillo (born 1963), jazz musician.
- Eduardo Viveiros de Castro (born 1951), anthropologist.
- Cazuza (1958–1990), composer, poet and singer.
- Carlos Chagas Filho (1910–2000), physician and scientist.
- Paulo Coelho (born 1947), writer.
- Edgard Cognat (1919–1994), painter and sculptor.
- Fernando Collor (born 1949), politician.
- Philippe Coutinho (born 1992), footballer.
- Charles Oliveira (born 1989), mixed martial artist.

== D ==
- Da Lou (born 1983), musician
- Eumir Deodato (born 1943), Grammy Award-winning musician.
- Jorge José Emiliano dos Santos (1954–1995), football referee.
- Orlando Drummond (1919–2021), actor and dubbing film maker.

== F ==
- Washington de Mesquista Ferreira (born 1986), footballer.

== G ==
- Allan Góes (born 1971), mixed martial artist.
- Roger Gracie (born 1981), jiu-jitsu/MMA fighter.
- Royce Gracie (born 1966), jiu-jitsu/MMA fighter.

== H ==
- Joao Havelange (1916–2016), president of FIFA 1974–1998.

== I ==
- Isabel, Princess Imperial of Brazil (1846–1921), Empire of Brazil and the Empire's regent on three occasions.

== J ==
- Jairzinho (born 1944), footballer, World Cup champion.
- Tom Jobim (1927–1994), composer and musician, one of the creators of Bossa Nova.
- Jorge Sá Earp (born 1955), diplomat, poet, short story writer, and novelist.

== L ==
- Suellen Labrujo, champion ice skater.
- Thiago Lacerda (born 1978), actor
- Carlos Lacerda (1914–1977), politician, governor of Rio.
- Dona Ivone Lara (1921–2018), singer and composer.
- Leandra Leal (born 1982), actress.
- Ivan Lins (born 1945), Latin Grammy Award-winning musician, composer and singer.
- Arlindo Lopes (born 1979), actor.
- Kiko Loureiro (born 1972), member of several heavy metal bands, including Angra and Megadeth.
- Adolfo Lutz (1855–1940), physician and scientist.

== M ==
- Bernardino Machado (1851–1944), twice President of Portugal.
- Carlos Machado (born 1963), jiu-jitsu fighter.
- Machado de Assis (1839–1908), writer.
- Djan Madruga (born 1958), swimmer, Olympic medalist.
- Rosa Magalhães (1947–2024), carnival producer.
- César Maia (born 1945), politician, mayor of Rio de Janeiro.
- Maria II (1819–1853), Queen of Portugal.
- Roberto Marinho (1904–2003), President and founder of Organizações Globo; businessman person.
- Roberta Marquez (born 1977), ballet dancer.
- Ronnie Marruda (born 1954), actor and singer
- Thadeu Matos (born 1990 or 1991), voice actor and singer
- Cildo Meireles (born 1948), visual artist.
- Sérgio Vieira de Mello (1948–2003), diplomat.
- José Guilherme Merquior (1941–1991), diplomat, writer and literary critic.
- Marisa Monte (born 1967), singer and composer.
- Fernanda Montenegro (born 1929), actress, Oscar nominee.
- Vinícius de Moraes (1913–1980), writer, poet, musician and diplomat.
- Fabrizio Moretti (born 1980), drummer of the American band The Strokes.
- Mussum (1941–1994), actor.

== N ==
- Ana Beatriz Nogueira (1967), actress
- Gustavo Nasr (Ken 1979), cinematographer
- Oscar Niemeyer (1907–2012), architect.

== O ==
- Hélio Oiticica (1937–1980), visual artist.
- Lourdes de Oliveira (born 1938), actress.

== P ==
- José Padilha (born 1967), film director.
- Eduardo Paes (born 1969), politician and current mayor of Rio de Janeiro.
- Paineiros (born 1984), footballer.
- Abraham Palatnik (1928–2020), artist and inventor.
- Carlos Alberto Parreira (born 1943), football coach.
- Marcos Palmeira (born 1963), brazilian telenovela actor.
- Andrew Parsons (born 1977), 3rd president of International Paralympic Committee.
- Douglas Donato Pereira (1991–2016), drug lord.
- Nelson Piquet (born 1952), Formula One driver.
- Glória Pires (born 1963), actress.
- Sandra Pires (born 1973), beach volleyball player, Olympic champion.
- Pixinguinha (1897–1973), one of the fathers of Chorinho music.
- Diogo Portela (born 1988), darts player.

== R ==
- Pedro II (1825–1891), Emperor of Brazil.
- Bernardo Rocha de Rezende (born 1959), former volleyball player and coach.
- Eduardo Riedel (born 1969), politician, 12th Governor of Mato Grosso do Sul.
- Romário (born 1966), footballer.
- Ronaldo (born 1976), footballer.
- Noel Rosa (1910–1937), composer and singer.
- Marco Ruas (born 1961), mixed martial artist.
- Renato Russo (1960–1996), composer, poet and singer, leader of the band Legião Urbana.

== S ==
- Walter Salles (born 1956), film director.
- Jorge Santiago (born 1980), MMA fighter.
- Silvio Santos (1930–2024), owner of the SBT television station.
- Leticia Spiller (born 1973), actress, singer.
- Sebastian of Bourbon and Braganza (1811–1875), Infante of Portugal and Spain.
- Jackie Silva (born 1962), beach volleyball player, Olympic champion.
- Robson da Silva (born 1964), sprinter, Olympic medalist.
- Thiago Silva (born 1984), footballer.
- Carolina Solberg (born 1987), beach volleyball player.
- Érika de Souza (born 1982), WNBA player.
- Giulliana Succine (born 1991), actress and psychologist.
- Daniele Suzuki (born 1977), TV host.

== T ==
- Carlos Alberto Torres (1944–2016), footballer.

== U ==
- João Henrique Ulrich Júnior (1850-1895), vice-consul of Brazil.

== V ==
- Marcos Valle (born 1943), musician.
- Renata Vasconcellos (born 1972), journalist.
- Charles Veitch (born 1980), far-right YouTuber and former conspiracy theorist.
- Heitor Villa-Lobos (1887–1959), classical composer and conductor.

== Z ==
- Zico (born 1953), footballer.

== See also ==
- List of Brazilians
