= Rodrigo Bocardi =

Brazilian journalist

- Born: January 4, 1976 (age 50); Ipaussu, São Paulo, Brazil
- Occupations: Journalist and TV host
- Children: 3

Rodrigo Bocardi de Moura, best known as Rodrigo Bocardi (born January 4, 1976), is a Brazilian journalist and TV host.

== Biography and career ==
Rodrigo graduated in journalism in 1997 from FIAM and began his career at Grupo Bandeirantes. He was later called by TV Globo to be economics editor for Jornal da Globo.

He soon became a reporter and left TV Globo to work, between 2003 and 2004, in Angola, on that country's public TV. He returned to Globo after this experience, becoming a correspondent in New York in 2009. In 2013, he returned to Brazil to present Bom Dia São Paulo and make appearances as a São Paulo anchor on Bom Dia Brasil.

He was successful in the role and in the same year he eventually started presenting Jornal Hoje. Still in 2013, in December, Bocardi started to replace Chico Pinheiro in the presentation of Bom Dia Brasil, during the journalist's vacation.

In December 2014, after changes to the schedule at Globo, he also started presenting the local block of Bom Dia Brasil. On September 10, 2016, he took over as one of the occasional presenters of Jornal Nacional.

In May 2020, he debuted as an occasional presenter on SPTV. In August 2020, he resumed the eventual presentation of Jornal Hoje.

On November 9, 2020, he made his radio debut, presenting the Ponto Final CBN program on the radio network CBN, alongside journalist Carolina Morand, who co-presents the program directly from the CBN Rio de Janeiro studios.

On November 15, 2020, he presented Antena Paulista Especial, live, covering the first round of the municipal elections in São Paulo.

On December 21, 2020, he debuted as an occasional presenter for Jornal da Globo, replacing journalist Renata Lo Prete on her vacations and days off.

On January 30, 2025, Globo announced in a statement that Bocardi would be fired for failing to comply with the ethical standards of journalism.

On June 9, 2026, Bocardi was hired by SBT to present is new nightly news program. Titled SBT Cidades, the new program premiered on August 3. On September 10, Rodrigo was removed from SBT due to bribery alegations involving the district secretary of Embu das Artes to publish positive coverage about the region. Bocardi was dismissed on September 11 following allegations of censorship by SBT and possible involviment in the Banco Master scandal through Fábio Faria, husband of presenter and SBT heiress Patricia Abravanel.

== Personal life ==
He is married to Cláudia Bocardi and has three children: Anne, Gabriel and Gustavo Bocardi.
