= Waldvogel =

Waldvogel (from German: Wald "forest" plus Vogel "bird", thus literally "bird of the forest") and its Ashkenazic variant Waldfogel is a Swiss German surname from a nickname denoting a carefree, easy-going person and may refer to:

== Waldfogel ==
- Jane Waldfogel, American social economist
- Joel Waldfogel (born 1962), American economist

== Waldvogel ==
- Anton Waldvogel (1846–1917), Austrian technician and traffic planner
- Christian Waldvogel (born 1971), Swiss architect
- Georg Waldvogel (born 1961), German ski jumper
- József Waldvogel (1872–1952), Austro-Hungarian general
- Monica Waldvogel (born 1956), Brazilian journalist
- Procopius Waldvogel (15th-century), German printer
