= Alan Severiano =

Brazilian journalist

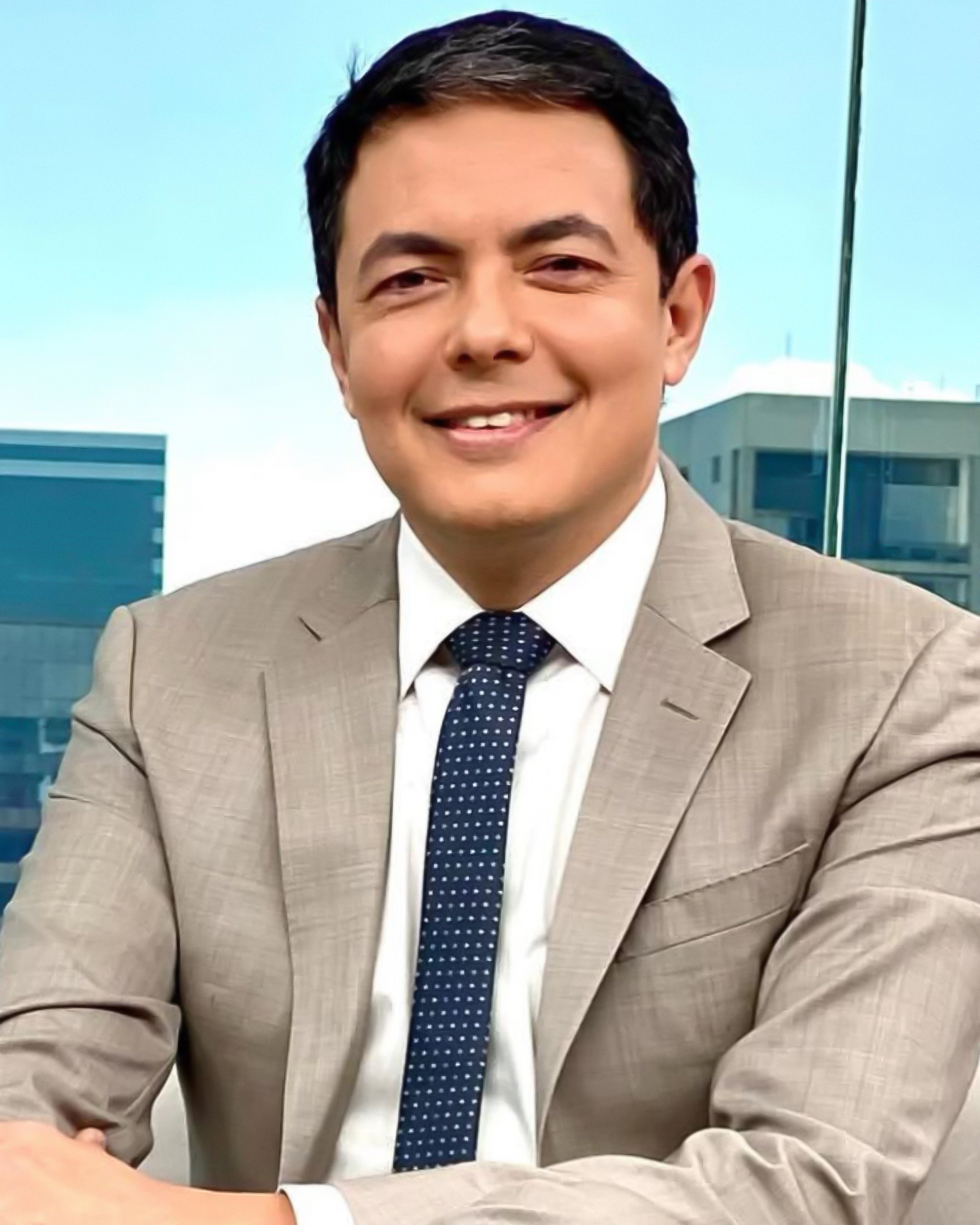
- Severiano in 2023
- Born: June 25, 1976 (age 50); Natal, Rio Grande do Norte, Brazil
- Occupations: Journalist and TV host

Alan Silva Severiano, better known as Alan Severiano (born June 25, 1976), is a Brazilian journalist and TV host.

== Biography and career ==
Born in Natal, Rio Grande do Norte, Alan graduated in 1997 from the Federal University of Rio Grande do Norte, While still in college, Alan worked as a reporter for one year and eight months for TV Universitária, a Natal broadcaster linked to Rede Educativa. He went to São Paulo because of the course.

Even though he encountered some difficulties at the beginning of his stay in the capital of São Paulo, he adapted quickly. After the course, he was called by TV Cultura to cover video reporting holidays for a month. After this period, he received a proposal from EPTV Ribeirão, a TV Globo affiliate in Ribeirão Preto, to also cover holidays – only in the report – for three weeks. He was then called back by TV Cultura to work at the newspaper 60 Minutos and, eventually, write articles for Jornal da Cultura, where he remained for three years.

In 2001, he was invited to join the reporting team at TV Globo São Paulo. He started at SPTV, where he reported in the early hours of the morning for around two months. He also spent a year at GloboNews, in the political and economic area. From 2004 to 2013, he was a reporter for Globo news programs such as Bom Dia Brasil.

In April 2013, he became Globo's international correspondent in New York, where he stayed until 2017 reporting for all of the network's news programs and special articles for Fantástico. Among his most notable coverages, highlight is the coverage of the kidnapping of Patrícia Abravanel, daughter of the businessman and owner of SBT, Silvio Santos, in which he was also taken hostage, which occurred in 2001.

On May 25, 2019, he debuted as an occasional presenter on SPTV. Between May 11 and 23, 2020, during the COVID-19 pandemic, Severiano temporarily presented the second edition of the newscast, replacing Christiane Pelajo and being replaced by Márcio Gomes.

On October 15, 2021, César Tralli said goodbye to presenting SP1, handing over command of the news program to Alan Severiano. On October 18, he debuted as the main presenter of the news program.

== Awards and nominations ==
Year	Award	Category	Result	Ref.
2023	Melhores do Ano NaTelinha	Best Local Presenter	Nominated	
2024	Melhores do Ano NaTelinha	Best Local Presenter	Nominated	
