= Andréia Sadi =

Brazilian journalist

- Sadi in 2024
- Born: Andréia Koudsi Sadi; May 8, 1987 (age 39); São Paulo, SP, Brazil
- Citizenship: Brazilian
- Occupations: journalist reporter
- Years active: 2009–present
- Notable work: Em Foco com Andréia Sadi; Meninas do Jô (Programa do Jô); Papo de Política
- Spouse: André Rizek (m. 2020)

Andréia Koudsi Sadi (May 8, 1987) is a Brazilian journalist. She has worked at GloboNews since September 2015, covering the behind-the-scenes of politics in Brasília. In 2022, she began hosting the program Estúdio i, replacing Maria Beltrão.

== Biography ==
=== First years and education ===
Sadi was born in the city of São Paulo, the daughter of Calros Sadi, a lawyer and lifetime board member of São Paulo FC, and Sara Cristina Koudsi, a stockbroker who holds a degree in literature from Mackenzie Presbyterian University. She earned a degree in journalism from the Pontifical Catholic University of São Paulo (PUC-SP).

=== Career ===
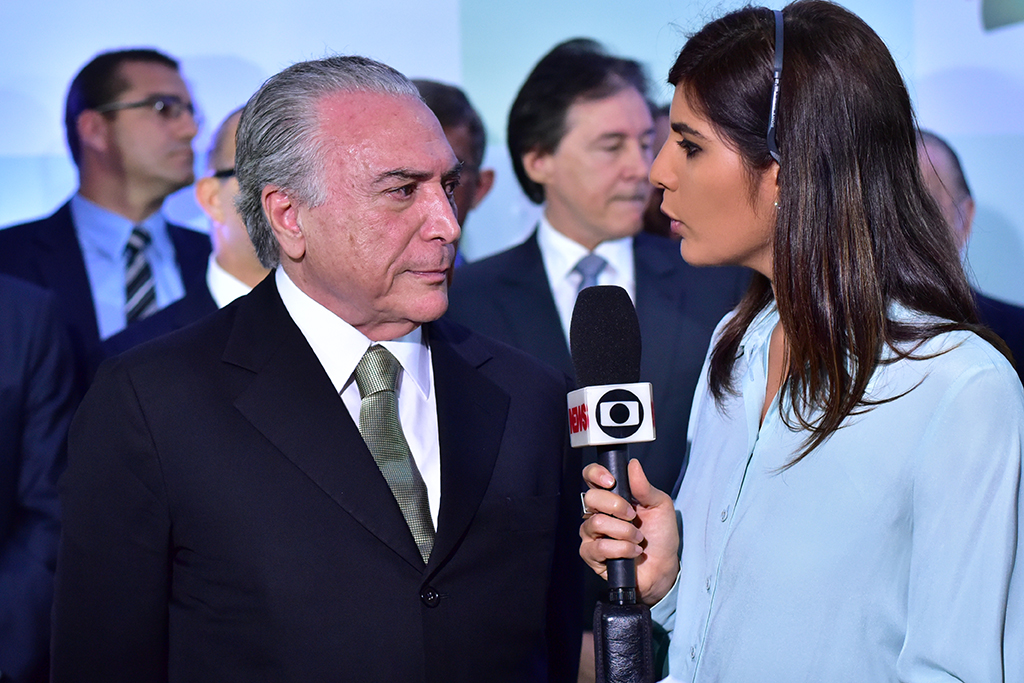
Andréia Sadi interviewing then-Vice President Michel Temer (PMDB)

In 2009, she worked for digital portal R7, part of the Record Group. While working there, she became embroiled in a controversy with Sandro Mabel (PR), a former federal deputy from Goiás, who sued the group and the journalist over an article published in October of that year that incorrectly implicated him in the Mensalão scandal. In 2010, she moved to Brasília, covering the behind-the-scenes world of politics for portal iG, and later for Portal G1, affiliated with Grupo Globo and the newspaper Folha de S.Paulo, where he wrote the Painel column, the newspaper’s main political column. In September 2015, she was hired by the Globo Group to work for its news channel, GloboNews, where she appeared on several of the channel's news programs.

In late June 2016, she was interviewed on the now-defunct Programa do Jô, hosted by comedian Jô Soares and aired on TV Globo. Her performance led to her being invited to participate on July 20 in a special segment of the show, called Meninas do Jô, that brought together female journalists for a debate on politics.

On February 1, 2017, Andréia Sadi launched her blog on G1, writing about the behind-the-scenes world of politics in Brasília. In February 2019, she began hosting the program Em Foco com Andréia Sadi on GloboNews, a talk show featuring prominent figures in the Brazilian political scene. The program aired until April 2022, when its final guest was the then-governor of São Paulo, Rodrigo Garcia (PSDB). Between 2019 and 2022, she appeared on the political podcast Papo de Política alongside journalists Natuza Nery, Maju Coutinho, and Julia Duailibi.

On June 6, 2022, she made her debut as the anchor of GloboNews's Estúdio i program, replacing Maria Beltrão. On June 24, 2023, she joined the team of guest anchors on Jornal Hoje. In April 2026, she became a political commentator for the morning news program Bom Dia Brasil. Still in 2026, the podcast POD_i debuted as the first GloboNews program to be streamed on YouTube.

== Filmography ==
=== TV ===
Year	Title	Broadcast	Note(s)	Ref.
2022–present	Estúdio i	GloboNews		
2023–present	Jornal Hoje	TV Globo		
2023	Alma Cozinheira	GNT	Episode: "January 1, 2023"	
2023	Que História É Essa, Porchat?	GNT	Episode: "March 14, 2023"	
2024	Um Beijo do Gordo	Globoplay	Documentary	
2025	Angélica Ao Vivo	GNT	Episode: "December 4, 2025"	
2026–present	Bom Dia Brasil	TV Globo		

=== Internet ===
Year	Title	Broadcast	Note(s)	Ref.
2019–2022	Papo de política	G1	Podcast	
2026–present	POD_i	GloboNews (via YouTube)		

== Personal life ==
Andréia Sadi is of Arab descent and is the middle child of three siblings. Her maternal grandfather was Iraqi, and her paternal grandmother’s family is from the Beka Valley in Lebanon. She is also of Syrian descent on her father’s side. Shortly before she was born, her mother’s water broke while she was taking a shower. The couple rushed to the hospital, but they didn’t make it in time, and she was delivered in the car by her mother herself. Her parents separated when Andréia was twelve, and her mother raised the three teenage children on her own. She's a São Paulo FC fan.

From 2013 to 2018, Andréia was married to Paulo Celso Pereira, also a political journalist, who served as the director of journalism for Época magazine and the Brasília bureau of the newspaper O Globo. In March 2020, she married sports journalist and television host André Rizek. On April 7, 2021, the couple’s twins, João and Pedro, were born.

== Prizes ==
In July 2017, she was named the winner in the “TV News Reporter” category for 2016 at the twelfth edition of the Troféu Mulher Imprensa. In November 2022, Andréia Sadi was named one of the top three winners at the iBest Awards in the “Influencer in Brasília” category.
