= Carlos Tramontina =

Brazilian journalist (born 1956)

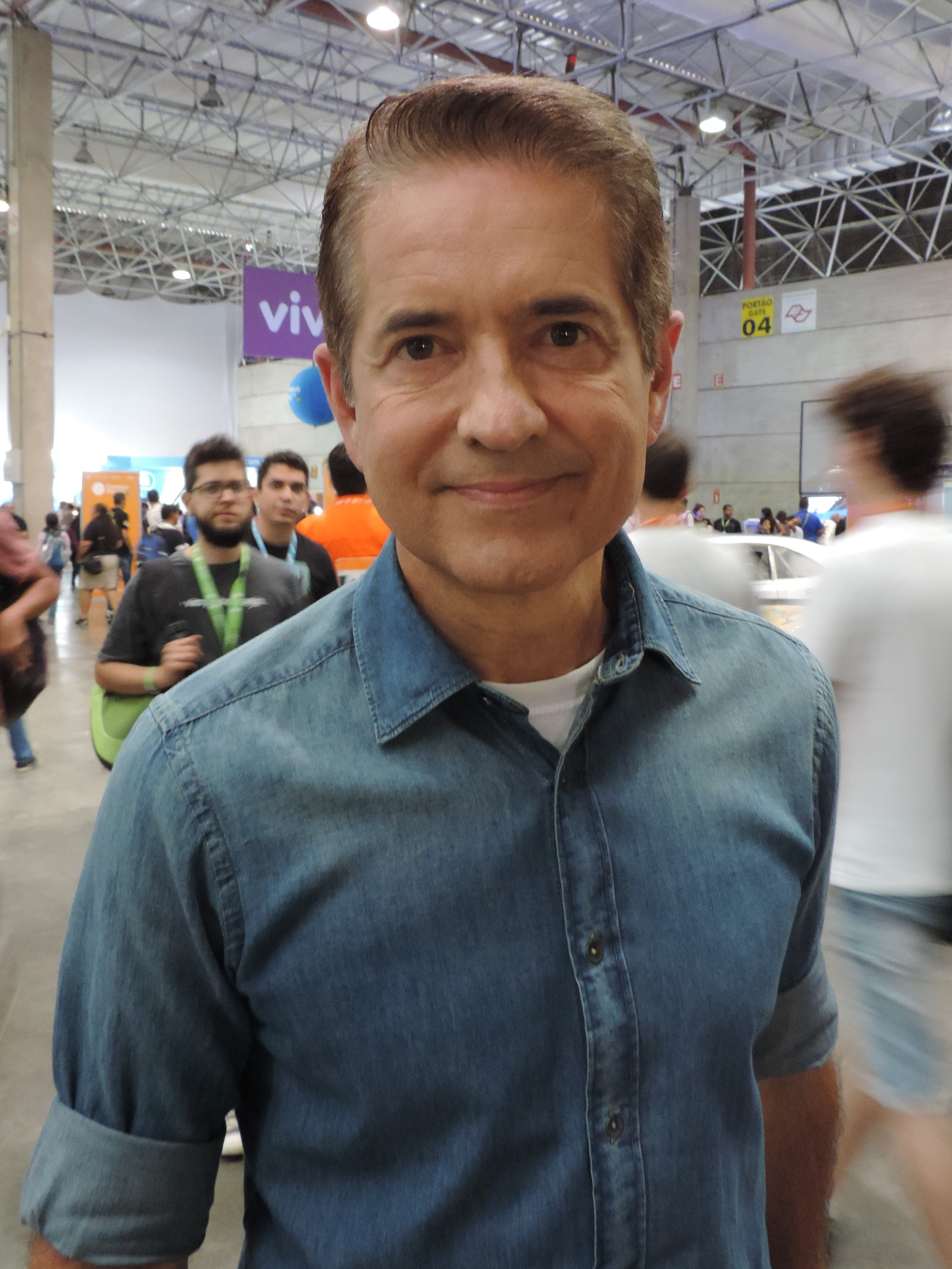
- Tramontina at the 2015 Campus Party Brazil
- Born: Carlos Alberto Tramontina; June 5, 1956 (age 70); Adamantina, São Paulo, Brazil
- Education: Fundação Armando Alvares Penteado
- Occupations: Journalist and Anchor
- Years active: 1984–present
- Notable credit(s): SPTV 2ª Edição anchor (1998–prsesent)
- Spouse: Rosana Gerab Tramontina
- Children: Nathalia Tramontina, Caio Tramontina
- Family: Armando Tramontina, Vanda Furtado Tramontina

Carlos Alberto Tramontina and commonly known simply as Carlos Tramontina (born March 11, 1956, in Adamantina) is a Brazilian journalist.

He graduated in Journalism at Fundação Armando Alvares Penteado in 1977. He was editor-in-chief and news presenter of Bom Dia São Paulo and São Paulo Já. In 1998, he co-presented SPTV with Débora Meneses.

In 2000, he temporarily presented Jornal da Globo, replacing Lilian Witte Fibe. He is currently the presenter of the second edition of SPTV and the weekly Antena Paulista.

He is noted for being a mountaineering enthusiast, having published one book about his experience in Himalaya trying to climb the Island Peak.

== Programs ==
=== At Rede Globo ===
- SPTV 2ª Edição (1998–2020);
- Antena Paulista (since 1999)
- Jornal da Globo (from May to August 2000/ alternate 2000–2005; since 2017)
- Jornal Nacional (alternate Saturdays 2000–2005; since 2020)
- Bom Dia São Paulo (during the 1990s);
- SPTV 1ª Edição (until 1998);
- São Paulo Já (1993).

=== At Globo News ===
- N de Notícia (until 2001).

== Bibliography ==
- Entrevista (Interview) — Editora Globo (1997)
- A morada dos deuses: um repórter nas trilhas do Himalaia (Home of the gods: a reporter on the trails of Himalaya) — Sá Editora (2004)
- Tietê, presente e futuro (Tietê, present and future) — BEI (2011)
