= Gustavo Nasr =

Brazilian cinematographer and film director

- Born: 21 February 1979 (age 47)
- Occupations: Cinematographer, film director
- Website: Official website

Gustavo Nasr (born 21 February 1979) is a cinematographer and film director from Rio de Janeiro, Brazil. His first film as a cinematographer and director, Aqueles Dias, starring Cynthia Falabella, exhibited at the Clermont-Ferrand International Short Film Festival market, had won 11 awards and nominations nationally and internationally, including the Best Cinematography Language at the Amazonas Film Festival. He also won the award for Best Cinematography at the Guarnice Festival.

Adorável Psicose, a TV series from Multishow, directed and photographed by Gustavo Nasr, was a two-time winner of the Best Comedy TV Series at the Monet Magazine Awards in 2012 and 2013.

== Work ==
A member of the Brazilian Cinematography Association, Mr. Mardini Nasr moved to the United States in 2014 to work on several productions as a director and director of photography with Producing Partners and TRIA Productions, owned by Tatiana Issa and Raphael Alvarez, directors of the most awarded documentary in the history of Brazil, Dzi Croquettes.

During 2014, Gustavo Nasr directed, photographed and finalized many of TRIA Productions' shows that were a success in Brazilian TV: Anota Aí, Além da Conta with Ingrid Guimaraes; and Almanaque Musical with Marisa Orth and Rebobina; reaching a total audience of 33 million viewers. Most of these productions were targeted to Brazilians and presented unlikely and off-the-beaten-path sides of cities such as New York City, Miami, Las Vegas and many others that are major attractions for tourists from Brazil.

== Awards and nominations ==
- Dia de Preto (feature film)
  - Best Cinematography - Guarnicê Festival 2012
- Aqueles Dias (short film)
  - Best Visual Language - CineAmazônia 2005
  - Nominated Best Short Film - Tiradentes Film Festival 2005
  - Nominated Best Short Film - Mostra do Filme Livre, Rio de Janeiro 2005
  - Nominated Best Short Film - Ribeirão Preto Film Festival 2005
  - Nominated Best Short Film – Vide Video CCBB UFRJ 2005
  - Nominated Best Short Film – Festival Brasileiro de Cinema Universitario 2005
  - Official Selection – Clermont-Ferrand Short Film Market, France 2005
  - Official Selection - International Short Film Festival, São Paulo 2005
  - Official Selection – FestCine Belem, Para 2005
  - Official Selection – Festival America do Sul, Mato Grosso do Sul 2005
  - Official Selection - International Short Film Festival, Rio de Janeiro 2004
  - O Aborto (short film)
  - Nominated Best Short Film - Mix Brasil Film Festival, São Paulo 2002
  - Nominated Best Short Film - Paraty Film Festival, Rio de Janeiro 2002
