= Chico Pinheiro =

Brazilian journalist and news anchor

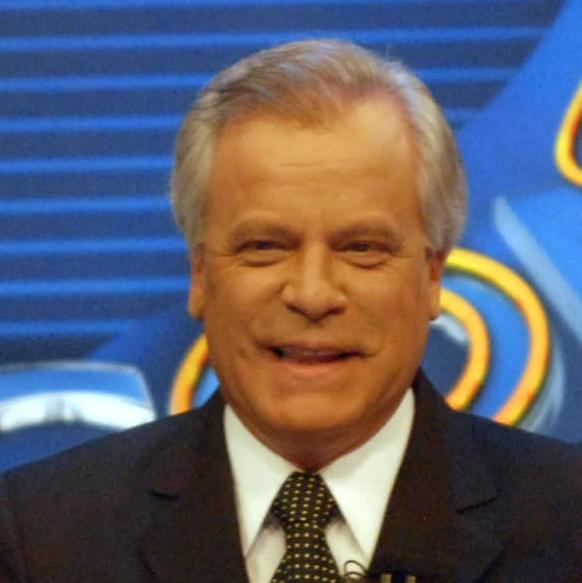
- Born: Francisco de Assis Pinheiro; June 17, 1953 (age 71); Santa Maria, Rio Grande do Sul, Brazil
- Education: PUC Minas
- Occupation(s): Journalist and news anchor
- Years active: 1960–present
- Notable credits: SPTV 1st anchor (1998–2011); Bom Dia Brasil anchor (2011–2020)
- Spouses: Carla Vilhena (m. 1993; div. 2010); Leda Rielli (m. 2010)

Francisco de Assis Pinheiro, known professionally as Chico Pinheiro (born 17 June 1953, in Santa Maria), is a Brazilian newscaster and journalist. He is the current editor-in-chief and anchorman of Bom Dia Brasil, the Brazilian news program, aired by Rede Globo.

== Career ==
Pinheiro was born in Rio Grande do Sul, but moved to his parents' home state of Minas Gerais as a baby. He graduated in journalism by PUC Minas and began his career in Diário de Minas, Jornal do Brasil and TV Globo Minas. At the end of 1989, he moved to São Paulo, where he was hired by TV Bandeirantes where he presented the programs Canal Livre, Jornal da Noite, Jornal de Domingo and Jornal da Band. In 1995, he moved to Rede Record, but left after a pastor of Igreja Universal do Reino de Deus kicked a Nossa Senhora Aparecida icon during a religious program broadcast by the channel. Soon after, he joined Radio CBN.

Also in 1996, Chico returned to Globo to be the anchor of Bom Dia São Paulo and Bom Dia Brasil, which debuted in new format. Since then, he became one of the relief anchors for both news programs, Jornal Nacional and Jornal da Globo. Later he went on to anchor the local news program SPTV, from 1998 to 2011, and Espaço Aberto on Globo News, which is now called Sarau, where he interviewed well-known names in Brazilian Popular Music scene. In 2011, he became the main anchor of Bom Dia Brasil, replacing Renato Machado, who later became a correspondent in London, England and since 2014, he presents the parades of the samba schools in São Paulo.

== TV news ==
Rede Bandeirantes

- Jornal da Noite (in Portuguese) (1992-1993);
- Jornal de Domingo (1993);
- Jornal da Band (in Portuguese) (1992-1995).

Rede Record

- Jornal da Record (in Portuguese) (1995-1996);

Rede Globo

- Bom Dia São Paulo and Bom Dia Brasil (in Portuguese) (1996-1998);
- SPTV 1ª Edição (in Portuguese) (1998-2011);
- Bom Dia Brasil (2011–2020).

Globo News

- Sarau (until 2007).

=== Stand-in Presenter ===
Globo

- Jornal Nacional (Since 1996);
- Jornal da Globo (2000-2005)
