= Cecília Malan =

Brazilian journalist

- Born: 16 April 1983 (age 42); Rio de Janeiro, Brazil
- Education: Pontifícia Universidade Católica do Rio de Janeiro
- Occupation: Journalist

Cecília Malan (born 16 April 1983) is a Brazilian broadcast journalist. She is the daughter of Brazilian economist and former Minister of Finance, Pedro Malan. She has been the London-based correspondent for Rede Globo since 2011.

== Career ==
Malan was born on 16 April 1983 in Rio de Janeiro. She lived in New York, Washington, D.C., Brasília and Paris before majoring in journalism at Pontifícia Universidade Católica do Rio de Janeiro. She started her career at Globo TV in 2005, as an intern on the morning news show, Bom Dia Brasil. At the foreign news desk, as an international editor, she helped cover the deaths of Pope John Paul II and Michael Jackson, the devastation of Hurricane Katrina, Barack Obama's historical election, and the global crisis of 2008, among other stories.

In 2011, Malan transferred to the London bureau. She has been producing and reporting on breaking news, business, political, lifestyle, cultural and entertainment stories since.

Malan reported on all the major terror attacks of the past decade in the UK (murders of Fusilier Lee Rigby and MP Jo Cox, Westminster Bridge attack, Manchester Arena bombing, London Bridge nightmare). Beyond London, Malan also covered the attacks on the French satirical magazine Charlie Hebdo in January 2015. Hours into her reporting on the dramatic events unfolding in Paris, French special forces stormed the kosher market where hostages were being held. Less than 300 meters away from the scene, she was surprised by the sound of explosions and gunshots. During her live broadcast, she readily admitted to never having heard the sound of gunfire before. The episode instantly became a trending topic on Twitter. Most viewers praised her "authentic spontaneity" and appreciated the fact that "journalists are not robots", while others considered her to be "too nervous".

Malan has also conducted high-profile interviews with some of the biggest names in the public eye: David Beckham, Brad Pitt, the boys from One Direction, English singer and songwriter Adele, celebrity chef Jamie Oliver, author E. L. James, ex-Guantanamo Bay detainee Moazzam Begg and former British Prime Minister David Cameron.

The good, the bad and the ugly of Brexit dominated her reporting for many years in London. As did COVID-19. Malan spent more than a year doing live broadcasts from home during the pandemic.

Malan was married from 2013 to 2020. She has a daughter, Olimpia, born in 2019.

In April 2026, Malan released Eu e Elas: Histórias Maternas, a book about her experience and that of other women with the topic of motherhood.
