= Mostra do Filme Livre =

Brazilian independent film festival

- Location: Rio de Janeiro, São Paulo and Brasília, Brazil
- Founded: 2002
- Founded by: Guilherme Whitaker
- Awards: Filme Livre! trophy
- Hosted by: WSET Multimídia
- Website: mostralivre.com

Mostra do Filme Livre (MFL; lit. 'Free Film Show') is a Brazilian film festival dedicated to independent productions. The filmmaker and producer Guilherme Whitaker created it in Rio de Janeiro, where its first edition was held at the Centro Cultural Banco do Brasil (CCBB) in January 2002, and it has been produced by WSET Multimídia since then. From 2002 to 2019 it was held at the CCBB cultural centers of Banco do Brasil, its sponsor, adding stages in São Paulo in 2011, Brasília in 2012 and Belo Horizonte in 2015; it was also presented in Lima in 2014 and in Boston in 2017. Admission is free. Agência Brasil, O Estado de S. Paulo and the Correio da Manhã have described it as the largest showcase of independent film in Brazil.

Films of any genre, format, length and year of production may be entered, and the festival was set up for low-budget work, made without public money, that other festivals did not accept. Its program is divided into sections, among them Panoramas Livres; Mundo Livre, for films made by Brazilians abroad; Pílulas, for very short films; and Mostrinha Livre, for children. Each edition honors a figure of Brazilian alternative cinema, and the festival awards the Filme Livre! trophy; recent editions have also announced cash prizes. After losing its sponsorship, the festival was held online in 2020 and 2022 and returned to in-person screenings in Rio de Janeiro and Brasília in 2023. Its 21st edition was shown in Rio de Janeiro and Brasília before a São Paulo stage scheduled for February 2025, and a 22nd edition was planned for 2027.

== History ==
=== Origins ===
The filmmaker and producer Guilherme Whitaker created the festival in Rio de Janeiro in 2002. It grew out of the city's film-club movement. One of the clubs, Mostra o que neguinho tá fazendo, held monthly sessions at the Fundição Progresso in the Lapa district from 1999 or between 2000 and 2002. The club strongly defended Super 8 and other artisanal formats and became an important meeting place for Rio's independent scene. Whitaker and several people who curated the festival's early editions, including Pedro Bronz, Chico Serra, Karen Akerman, Rodrigo Savastano and Marcelo Ikeda, had come together at film-club sessions, particularly this club's. Whitaker has recalled that the Fundição event was losing momentum in 2001, and that the MFL became its successor because he obtained a contact at the CCBB and the group received R$10,000.

The first edition was held at the CCBB in Rio in January 2002, and WSET Multimídia has produced the festival since then. Ikeda, one of its curators from that first edition, has described the MFL as the first regular showcase devoted mainly to Brazilian cinema to screen films of different gauges in the same session, giving room to new work that found no place at the country's film festivals.

The festival was set up to show low-budget films, made without public money, that had no place at other festivals, and to circulate home-made films and the work of small production companies. When it began, many films were being made but there were almost no places to see them. Whitaker has recalled that films shot on video or 16 mm then struggled to be screened because few events were interested in them, and that in 2002 video was regarded as inferior to cinema, whereas by 2018, in his view, video had overtaken it.

=== Expansion at the CCBB ===
Every edition held in person from 2002 to 2019 took place at the CCBB cultural centers of Banco do Brasil. In 2013 and 2014 the festival was sponsored by the bank and the Ministry of Culture. A doctoral thesis on Brazilian independent cinema, presented at the University of São Paulo in 2014 and published in 2016, noted that the MFL was funded by sponsorship through tax-exemption mechanisms, which in the author's view showed that such mechanisms mattered even to the independent scene.

The seventh edition was scheduled at the CCBB in Rio from 19 February to 9 March 2008, with about 300 films. From its tenth edition, in March 2011, the festival was also presented at the CCBB in São Paulo. That year 333 films were programmed across the two cities: 121 selected by the curators and 212 invited to special sessions and retrospectives. The 11th edition, in 2012, drew a then-record 801 entries, from which 180 films were selected; after Rio, where its sessions were scheduled from 1 to 22 March, it was to go on to Brasília, for the first time, and to São Paulo. In 2013 the 12th edition, with 233 films, moved from Rio to the CCBB in São Paulo, where it was shown from 17 April, and was scheduled in Brasília from 7 to 26 May, the festival's second year there.

The 13th edition opened at the CCBB in Rio on 12 March 2014 with 198 films chosen from 1,060 entries, and was scheduled to continue in Brasília (9–27 April) and São Paulo (14 May – 8 June). That year the festival was also presented in Lima, Peru. From 2015 it was shown at all of the CCBB venues in Brazil, including the one in Belo Horizonte. The 14th edition had been shown in Rio and Brasília when it was due to open at the CCBB in São Paulo on 29 April 2015, before going on to Belo Horizonte.

The 15th edition was scheduled to open at the CCBB in São Paulo on 16 March 2016 with 184 productions, 80 of them previously unreleased, and was in Brasília in April, with screenings there scheduled until 2 May; Whitaker put the number of films entered that year at more than 1,300. That year the festival received entries from other South American countries for the first time; some were to be shown in a session called Panaméricas Latinas, and the program also had a session devoted to Chilean cinema. In 2017 Boston University's College of Communication hosted a three-day program of ten films from the festival, which was referred to there as the Brazilian Free Spirit Film Festival.

The Brasília stage in 2018 was due to run at the CCBB from 24 April to 20 May with 200 films; more than 1,100 had been entered that year. The 18th edition, in 2019, was due to open at the CCBB in São Paulo on 27 March with 155 films, before stages in Brasília (16 April – 12 May) and Rio de Janeiro (from 8 May).

=== Loss of sponsorship and online editions ===
The festival had been held at the CCBB in Rio for 18 consecutive years when it lost its sponsorship in 2019, shortly before the COVID-19 pandemic. According to Whitaker, Banco do Brasil told the organizers at the end of 2019 that, after 18 years, it would no longer sponsor the festival through the CCBBs. The 19th edition, from 12 to 20 September 2020, was the first without CCBB sponsorship and, because of the pandemic, the first held online. Its 53 films, selected from 910 entries, were streamed free of charge on the Polo Audiovisual.tv platform, with support from the Polo Audiovisual da Zona da Mata, in Minas Gerais. A crowdfunding campaign, offering contributors festival T-shirts, mugs and artworks donated by artists, was set up to pay the edition's workers. Whitaker expected that festivals pushed online by the pandemic would keep at least some online sessions in later editions, reaching viewers outside Rio de Janeiro, São Paulo and Brasília, where the MFL had usually taken place.

In 2022 the festival held a special online edition on the theme of the pandemic, with support from RioFilme. Its screenings were scheduled from 10 to 16 January, in what was to be the festival's second year shown entirely online. Every film entered, 450 in all, had to deal with the pandemic, and 30 were selected for the competition; other films, not necessarily about the pandemic, were chosen for a non-competitive program.

=== Return to in-person screenings ===
In May 2023 the 20th edition was announced for September in Rio de Janeiro, with support from RioFilme, the city's public company for the development of its audiovisual industry. More than 1,300 films were entered and 180 were selected. The program published in September scheduled the edition from 14 to 24 September at four venues in Rio (the Estação Net Botafogo cinema, the CCBB, the Centro Cultural Justiça Federal and the Cinemateca do MAM), with part of the festival to follow online. The edition was then brought to the CCBB in Brasília, with a program of 160 titles scheduled from 22 November to 23 December 2023 that included a workshop in which participants were to make films on mobile phones for screening at the closing.

=== 2025 and later ===
The 21st edition was scheduled at the CCBB in Rio de Janeiro from 8 to 31 January 2025, with more than 170 films. Several new activities were planned for the Rio stage. From 17 to 19 January the CCBB cinemas were to host the Mercado MFL, a market supported by the city government through RioFilme, with business meetings between the festival's films and potential buyers for television, cinemas and the internet; Marcelo Ikeda was to teach a course during the market. For the first time, people with hearing impairments were to take part in the curation, selecting short films with Brazilian Sign Language and descriptive subtitles, and some sessions were to offer audio description.

The edition, which had already been shown in Brasília and Rio de Janeiro, was then scheduled at the CCBB in São Paulo from 1 to 28 February, the festival's first presentation in that city in six years. In March, 30 of its 170 films were to be shown online.

In October 2026 entries were open until 15 November for the 22nd edition, planned to begin in March 2027 in Brasília, Rio de Janeiro and São Paulo. WSET Multimídia was to produce it under the Rouanet Law.

== Program ==
Agência Brasil, O Estado de S. Paulo and the Correio da Manhã have described the festival as the largest showcase of independent cinema in Brazil. Screenings are free of charge.

=== Selection ===
Films may be entered whatever their genre, format, length or year of production; Whitaker has said that no other festival in Brazil does this, and that most festivals accept only films made within the previous two years. In 2011 work on any medium was eligible, from VHS and MiniDV to 16 mm and 35 mm film and mobile phones, and films already released on the internet were accepted. In 2013 the festival did not require films to be unreleased, and some of those programmed were old. For the 2027 edition, entries were limited to films that had not been released commercially or shown at earlier editions of the festival.

On average, 15% of the films entered each year are selected for the competition. Originality is among the chief qualities sought in entries, and Whitaker has said that the best camera or equipment is not a requirement. He has also said that in the festival's first years the way a film had been funded was central to its selection, and films made without any state support were favored; later the curators focused more on film language, and in his view a publicly funded film could also be livre if it was innovative.

In 2011, 92% of the 121 films selected by the curators had been made without incentive-law funding. In 2013, 105 of the 742 entries (14%) had received some form of state support. Most of the 198 films selected in 2014 had been produced without state support, and 90% of the films selected in 2016 had been made without public funds. In 2019, 134 of the 773 entries had received state support, and another 254 had been made at film schools.

In 2012 the curator Christian Caselli said that the selection favored films that subverted narrative language over conventional ones; he called the festival's name a provocation and said that the organizers had spent eleven years exploring, through their selections, what a filme livre (free film) might be. Folha de S.Paulo wrote in 2013 that the festival's central concept was still hard to define; the curator Chico Serra said he saw a filme livre as one that moves toward a form opposed to the conventional and the classical and offers a new perspective. That year Marcelo Ikeda said that the films were assessed on ethical, economic, political and aesthetic grounds.

The curators in 2013 were Marcelo Ikeda, Chico Serra, Christian Caselli, Gabriel Sanna, Manu Sobral, Cristiana Miranda and Whitaker. In 2019 the team was formed by Gabriel Sanna, Diego Franco, Scheilla Franca and Whitaker, and in 2023 and 2025 by Whitaker, Franca and Sanna.

=== Sections ===
The program is divided into sections, several of which recur from one edition to the next. Panoramas Livres presents a cross-section of independent production; it was one of the sections for short films in 2012, and in 2020 it included short, medium-length and feature films. Mundo Livre is devoted to films made by Brazilians abroad, and in 2023 foreign films shot in Brazil could also be entered for it. Pílulas is reserved for very short films: up to five minutes in 2012, 2020 and 2025, and up to three minutes in 2015. Mostrinha Livre presents films for children, and Biografemas, films about other artists.

Special sections in 2013 included Sexuada, for erotic films, Trash, and Coisas Nossas, for productions by the festival's own curators and staff. The 2023 and 2025 programs had sections called Caminhos, for film-school works; Sonoras, for experiments combining cinema and music; Territórios; and Autorias, for films by artists prominent in the festival's history. The 2023 program also included two sessions of Maldita, a section that the call for 2027 entries described as being for horror or comedy films. In 2025 local productions had their own sections, Cena Rio in Rio de Janeiro and Cena Sampa in São Paulo.

The Cabine Livre shows video art and experimental and contemplative films in a loop. After being presented in Rio de Janeiro in 2012, it was included in the 2013 program in Brasília, with screenings scheduled from 1 pm to 9 pm; in 2023 its nine sessions were scheduled at the CCBB in Rio, and in 2025 it was to be set up in partnership with Cavideo at the Estação Net Botafogo cinema.

=== Other activities ===
Besides the screenings, the festival has held debates, workshops, commented sessions and courses. Through its Cineclubes Livres program, film clubs selected around Brazil received a kit with a DVD of films from the program, a catalog and posters, and screened part of the festival locally. Whitaker said in 2016 that, besides the CCBBs, the festival's films circulated through a film-club circuit that had reached more than 60 cities in 2015. The Cineclubes Livres program was planned to return in 2025, with screenings in film clubs in Rio de Janeiro in July and August.

=== Tributes ===
Each edition honors a figure of Brazilian alternative cinema, with a retrospective of films and debates.

Honorees of selected editions
Year	Honoree	Notes
2008	Joel Pizzini	A complete retrospective of his work was planned, and his new film Anabazys was to premiere at the festival.
2009	Sérgio Ricardo	Multimedia artist.
2012	Edgard Navarro	His new film O homem que não dormia was to be shown.
2013	Carlos Alberto Prates	His six feature films were programmed.
2014	Ana Carolina	Her six feature films were programmed. Posthumous tributes to the documentary filmmaker Eduardo Coutinho, the actor Fernando Silva and the filmmaker Marcos Medeiros were also announced.
2015	Maurice Capovilla	The São Paulo stage was to open with his film Nervos de aço, in his presence.
2019	Sylvio Lanna and Geneton Moraes Neto	Two new films by Lanna, In memoriam – O roteiro do gravador and Um cinema caligráfico, were to premiere, and nine films by Moraes Neto made between 1973 and 1983, restored by the Cinemateca Pernambucana, were to be shown.
2025	Roberto Moura	A writer, filmmaker and former film lecturer at the Fluminense Federal University. His feature Katharsys – Histórias dos anos 80, Grande Otelo's last film, took more than 30 years to complete and premiered at the festival.

Other filmmakers honored by the festival include Elyseu Visconti Cavalleiro, Luiz Rosemberg Filho, Andrea Tonacci and Helena Ignez, and Paula Gaitán.

The 2019 edition was dedicated to the memory of Geneton Moraes Neto, the journalist Ricardo Boechat and the filmmaker Geraldo Veloso, and the 2020 edition to Sérgio Ricardo, who had died in July 2020. In May 2023 the 20th edition was announced as dedicated to four recently deceased filmmakers who had taken part in several editions: Maurice Capovilla, Nilson Primitivo, Clóvis Molinari and Ely Marques. The program published in September dedicated it to these four and to Carlos Alberto Prates. The 2025 edition was dedicated to Sylvio Lanna (1944–2024).

=== Awards ===
The festival's award is the Filme Livre! trophy. In 2013 the curators chose the winners: Allan Ribeiro's feature Esse amor que nos consome and seven short films, among them Gabriel Mascaro's A onda traz, o vento leva. The directors of the films chosen were invited to collect the trophy during the Rio stage and to discuss their films with the audience after the screening, and the curators were to publish new texts on the winning films in the catalog and on the website. The same thesis described the trophy as carrying no cash prize, which it attributed partly to the festival's relatively small budget; Whitaker put that budget at about R$100,000 for the Rio and São Paulo editions and a little less for Brasília.

In 2020 a jury was to choose three films to receive the trophy; the winners were Sinai Sganzerla's A mulher da luz própria, Ana Stella Cunha and Milene Avelar's Lealdade and Sebastian Wiedemann's Obatala film. For the 2022 special edition, a prize of R$5,000 was announced for the competing film with the most votes. The 2023 edition was announced with R$10,000 in cash prizes: R$1,000 for each of seven films chosen by the curators at the in-person stage, and for each of the three films most voted by the public online. Paula Gaitán and Walter Fernandes Jr were among the filmmakers awarded at the Rio stage. In 2025 the films of the online stage were to compete for cash prizes decided by the curators and by popular vote, with support from RioFilme through the Paulo Gustavo Law. For 2027, R$30,000 in prizes was planned, in categories that could include awards chosen by the curators and by a popular vote on the festival's website.
