= Monica Waldvogel =

Brazilian journalist

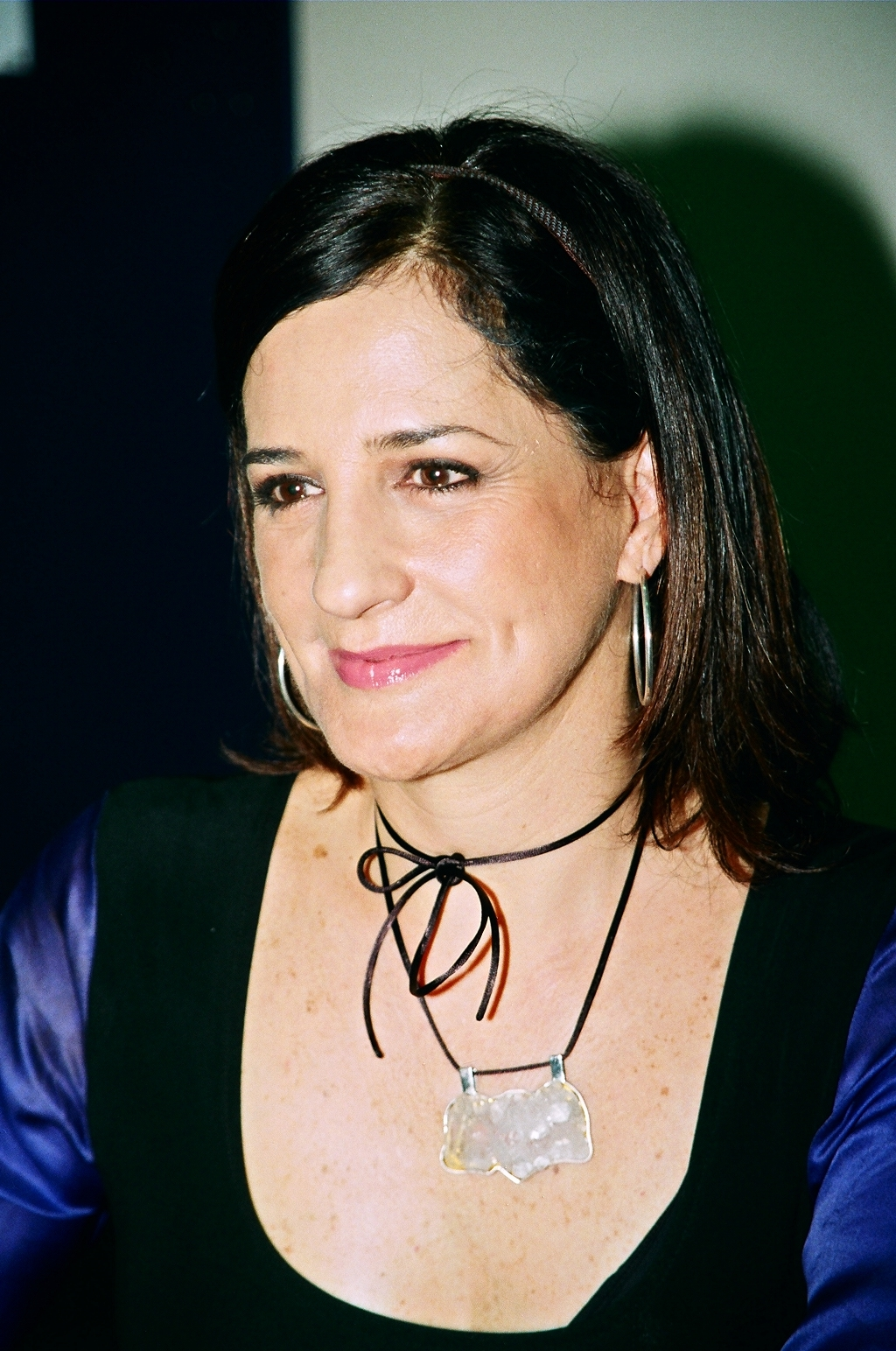
- Waldvogel at the 2009
- Born: February 9, 1956 (age 70); São Paulo, Brazil
- Occupations: Journalist and Anchor
- Years active: 1984–present
- Notable credit(s): Jornal Hoje anchor Jornal da Globo anchor

Monica Waldvogel (born February 9, 1956) is a Brazilian journalist.

She graduated in Journalism in 1977. She was editor-in-chief and news presenter of Jornal da Globo and Jornal Hoje. Since 2008, she presented Entre Aspas.

== Awards ==
- Mulher IMPRENSA trophy.
