= Ana Paula Araújo (newscaster) =

Brazilian newscaster and journalist (born 1972)

- Born: April 15, 1972 (age 54); Rio de Janeiro, Brazil
- Notable credit(s): RJTV 1st anchor (2000–2006 and 2009–2013); Bom Dia Brasil anchor (2013–present)
- Spouse: Christiano Londres (2004-2011)
- Children: 1
- Awards: International Emmy Award 2011

Ana Paula Araújo (born 15 April 1972 in Rio de Janeiro), is a Brazilian newscaster and journalist. She is the former anchorwoman of RJTV 1st Edition, and now current anchorwoman of Bom Dia Brasil, aired by TV Globo.

== Biography ==
Ana Paula received a bachelor's degree in journalism from Federal Fluminense University. Even before finishing her studies, it was possible to hear her voice in a radio station of Juiz de Fora, where she lived since she was a baby. She had a 3 year-experience in Rede Record and from 1994 to 1996, moved to former TV Manchete RJ, where she anchored the program Rio em Manchete. and the nationwide TV news Jornal da Manchete. When she moved to Globo TV in 1999, she initially anchored Bom Dia Rio, Rio de Janeiro local news, and also covered absences of main anchors in other news programs. After maternity leave, she became anchor of the program Globo Comunidade and covered absences of main anchors in Globo TV main news programs Jornal Hoje, Bom Dia Brasil, Fantastico. On November 23 of 2009, Ana Paula returned to be anchor of RJTV 1st Edition and since September 2013, she is one of the main anchors of nationwide TV news Bom Dia Brasil. Her coverage of 2010 military and police pacification and occupation of slums of Penha and Complexo do Alemão called Jornal Nacional: War on Drugs gained international recognition in 2011 by Emmy International award, the first one obtained by Globo TV. This coverage showed the difficulties of the war against drug dealers and drug cartels in Rio de Janeiro and how Brazilian military forces and Rio de Janeiro police (BOPE and military police) were acting to occupy and pacify slums.

== TV news ==
- RJTV 1ª and 2ª Edição (in Portuguese) (2000-2006 and 2009–2013);
- Bom Dia Rio (1999-2001);
- Globo Comunidade (2008-2009);
- Bom Dia Brasil (until 2013).

=== Presenter eventual ===
- Jornal Hoje (2008-2009);
- Jornal Nacional (until 2011);
- Fantástico (until 2012);
