= Da Lou =

- Born: Louise Cristine Ferreira Machado; 16 September 1983 (age 42); Rio de Janeiro, Rio de Janeiro, Brazil
- Genres: Pop rock
- Occupations: Recording artist; songwriter; Actress; dancer
- Instruments: Vocals, guitar
- Years active: 2005–present
- Label: Midas Music

Louise Cristine Machado (Rio de Janeiro, September 16, 1983) is a singer and songwriter of Brazilian Pop rock. Former participant of Joinville Dance Festival and Choral Univille, selected with the Collective XYZ group for Collective Artists 40th, monitors the Bienal de Porto Alegre and art teacher. Louise Cristine Machado has done a bit of everything to show how multi-talented, but his true calling is the same in music. Adept of the guitar since the age of 17, he recorded his first single "A Noite" in partnership with producer Rick Bonadio.

== Career ==
=== 2012: A Noite and Manufactures of dreams ===
Da Lou is the first artist to participate in the "Dream Factory" project in 2012, promoted by music producer Rick Bonadio, who produced Snuff, NX Zero, Rouge, Charlie Brown Jr. and others. She was chosen by the producer in an action on the web asking for musicians from all over Brazil to send their work to the producer. The lou then sent a home video of her song "A Noite" whose song was chosen to participate in the project. Rick Bonadio took Da Lou to São Paulo to record in the studio Midas Music. After finishing the work Rick was delighted with the Da lou From the vibe, and said that if the music broke out in his homeland, he would call there to record a CD. "A Noite" became the first single of his career, and won a music video.

=== 2013-present ===
On September 16, 2013, one year after the single "A Noite" Da lou spear in his birthday the video clip of the song "Teu Olhar". In October 2013, Da Lou participated in the TV program of Rede Globo, the Freshmen frame. On November 15, 2014, the Journal Lunch RBS TV Globo television news made the premiere of her new single "Perdi Meu Tempo" promoting its video clip.

== Discography ==
=== Singles ===
- A Noite (2012)
- Teu Olhar (2013)
- Perdi Meu Tempo (2014)
