= Giulliana Succine =

Brazilian actress

- Born: Giulliana Rocha de Barros Rego; 30 July 1991 (age 34); Rio de Janeiro, RJ, Brazil
- Other name: Giulli Succine
- Education: Estácio de Sá University
- Occupations: Actress psychologist
- Years active: 2002–present
- Agent: Agência Cintra (RJ)
- Television: Rebelde; Milagres de Jesus; Sol Nascente
- Partner: Daniel Tavares Lamassa

Giulliana Rocha de Barros Rego (born 30 July 1991), better known as Giulli Succine, is a Brazilian actress and psychologist. She began her career at the age of 11 in the theater with the play O Cinema e a Dança. Already in the television participated in programs like Rebelde, Milagres de Jesus and Sol Nascente.

== Biography ==
Giulliana Rocha de Barros Rego was born on 30 July 1991 in Barra da Tijuca, a neighborhood in the southern part of Rio de Janeiro. She made her debut in theater at the age of 11, in 2002, with the play O Cinema e Dança, then as protagonist the following year in A Bela e a Fera, soon after A Noviça Rebelde in 2004.

In 2010, she made her television debut in the miniseries A Vida Alheia produced by Rede Globo under the direction of Cininha de Paula. Two years later, she participated in the remake of Rebelde, a novel produced by RecordTV and directed by Ivan Zettel. In the year of 2014, she appeared in the episode of premiere of the biblical series Milagres de Jesus.

Between 2015 at 2017, she joined the stand-ins team of the series Escolinha do Professor Raimundo, adaptation of the original creation of Chico Anysio, where he worked alongside Ellen Roche. In 2016, she starred opposite the actor Bruno Gagliasso during the novel Sol Nascente, a month later reappeared in Malhação: Pro Dia Nascer Feliz, where the character Tânia lived in her youth.

After 14 years out of the theater, Giulliana returned in 2018 with the play Noite da Comédia Improvisada at Teatro Leblon in Rio de Janeiro, who stayed had a second season with the actress in September of the same year.

=== Personal life ===
In April 2019 she took up a relationship with Daniel Lamassa through Instagram. She is a cousin of the journalist Luca Moreira.

== Career ==
=== Television ===
Year	Title	Production Studio
2010	A Vida Alheia	Rede Globo
2012	Rebelde	Rede Record
2014	Milagres de Jesus	Rede Record
2015	Escolinha do Professor Raimundo	Rede Globo
2016	Sol Nascente	Rede Globo
2016	Malhação: Pro Dia Nascer Feliz	Rede Globo
2019	Jesus	Rede Record

=== Movies ===
Year	Title	Director
2007	Era Uma Vez	Charles Daves
2008	Navalha na Carne	Cininha de Paula
2009	Sweet Emily	Miguel Falabella
2009	A Partilha	Cininha de Paula
2014	Operação Orquídea	Paulo Siqueira
2015	A Maldição da Rosa	Thaís de Campos

=== Internet ===
Year	Title	Character	Platform
2012	#Partiu?	Fernanda	YouTube

=== Theater ===
Year	Title	Character
2002	O Cinema e a Dança	
2003	A Bela e a Fera	Bela
2004	A Noviça Rebelde	
2018	Noite da Comédia Improvisada	
2018	O Rio e Grande Elenco	Catharina/Suellen

=== Advertising Campaigns ===
Year	Title
2017	Semana da Comédia 2017 – Multishow
2017	Rock in Rio
2018	Claro Copa América
2019	Universidade Estácio de Sá
