= Paineiras (footballer) =

Brazilian footballer

Personal information
- Full name: Marcos Vinicius Paineiros Santos Souza
- Date of birth: February 5, 1984 (age 42)
- Place of birth: Rio de Janeiro, Brazil
- Height: 1.90 m (6 ft 3 in)
- Position: Central defender

Team information
- Current team: Botafogo

Youth career
- 2005–2006: Botafogo

Senior career*
Years	Team	Apps	(Gls)
2007	Botafogo		
- * Club domestic league appearances and goals

Marcos Vinicius Paineiros Santos Souza or simply Paineiras (born February 5, 1984, in Rio de Janeiro), is a central defender. He currently plays for Botafogo.

== Contract ==
- 1 March 2003 to 1 March 2008
