= Politics of the Empire of Brazil =

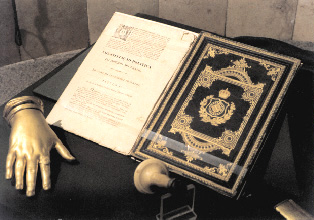
The Imperial Constitution of 1824 was the one that for the longest time was in the history of Brazil, between 1824 and 1889

Politics of the Empire of Brazil took place in a framework of a quasi-federal to unitary parliamentary representative democratic monarchy, whereby the Emperor of Brazil was the head of state and nominally head of government although the Prime Minister, called President of the Council of Ministers, was effectively the de facto head of government, and of a multi-party system. Executive power was exercised by the government. Legislative power was vested in both the government and the two chambers of the General Assembly (or Parliament). The Judiciary was independent of the Executive and the Legislative. There was also a fourth power, the Moderating power, exercised by the emperor. The Empire of Brazil was divided into 20 provinces and the Neutral Municipality, capital of the country.

== State structure ==
=== Monarchy ===
Upon gaining independence from Portugal in 1822, the Brazilian nation as a whole was almost entirely in favor of a monarchical form of government. There were a variety of reasons for this political choice. There was fear among various social groups of the possibility that Brazil would fall into the same political, social, and economic chaos experienced by most of the former Spanish American colonies: territorial dismemberment, coups, dictatorships and the rise of caudillos. The perceived necessity was for a political structure that would allow the Brazilian people not merely to enjoy the advantages of liberty, but also that would guarantee the country's stability, in conformance with the liberalism of the time. Only a neutral entity, completely independent of parties, groups or opposing ideologies, could achieve this end. And there was "always a powerful ideological element remaining from independence as the result of a great national union over particular interests." The Brazilian monarchy was "a form of government that assured a Brazil that would include the whole of the old Portuguese dominion, in a climate of order, peace, and freedom."

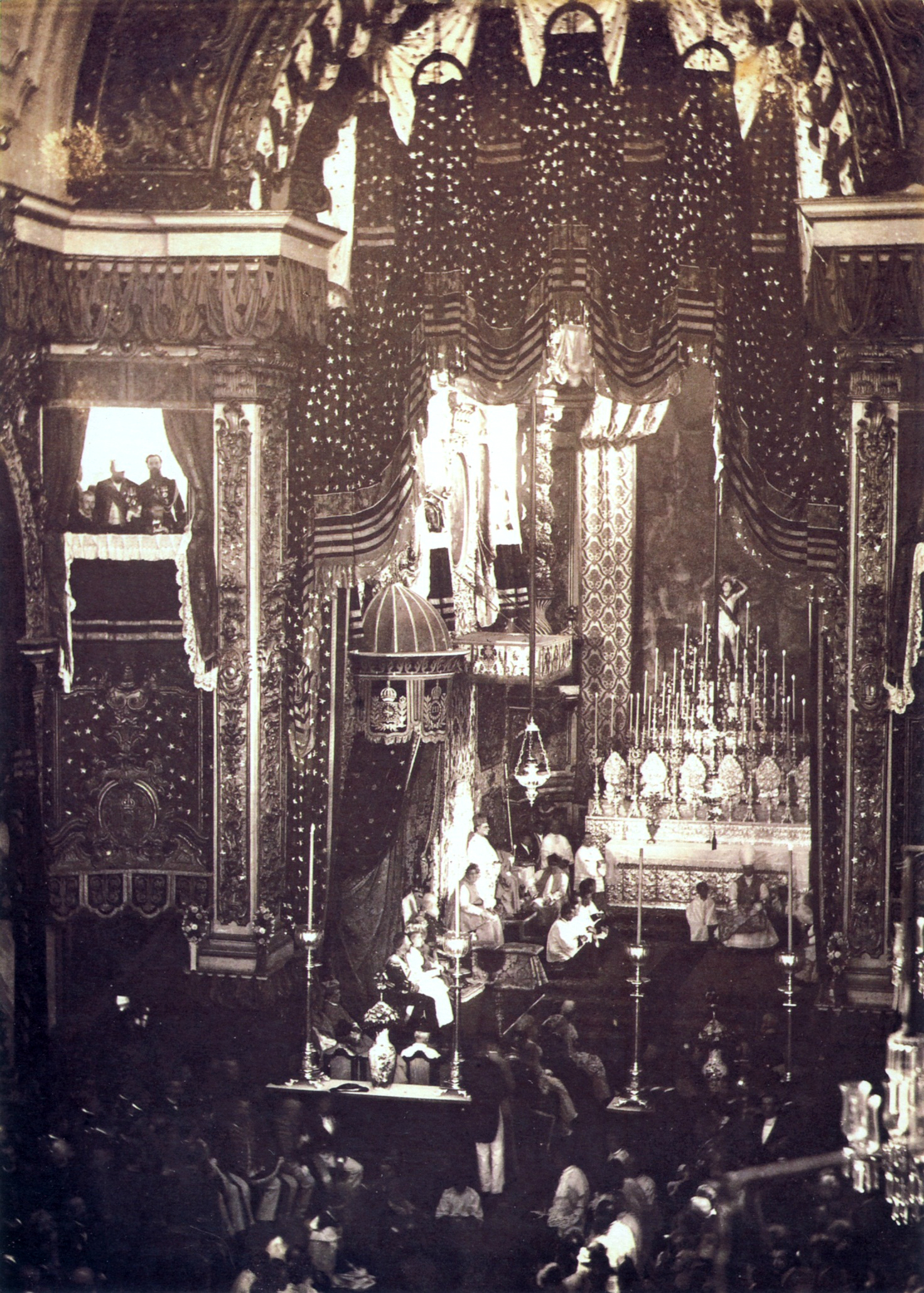
Although a constitutional monarchy, Brazil kept its centuries-old traditions.

There was also another reason for adoption of the monarchy, or more precisely, its maintenance. The Europeans, as much as the Africans and the Native Americans, came from monarchical societies. To remain under this form of government was a way of maintaining the traditions and identity of the Brazilian people, a people descended from those three distinct ethnic groups. The choice of a member of the House of Braganza came not just from the historical moment, but also from the fact that Prince Pedro descended from the pure male line of the Portuguese kings. The House of Braganza originated with Afonso, 1st Duke of Braganza, an illegitimate son of John I of the House of Aviz who, in turn, was the son of Peter I of the House of Burgundy, which was founded 300 years earlier in 1143 by Afonso Henriques, the first king of Portugal. Thus, the strong popular appeal of the monarchy, and a tradition of more than three hundred years (or seven hundred if Portuguese history is considered), enabled Prince Pedro to take on the role of a symbol of national unity. The monarchical regime maintained on Brazilian soil "was a force of continuity and tradition".

A third element in the choice of monarchy was the necessity to comply with the powers of the era, all located in Europe. The possibility of European countries seeking to dominate the young nation, strengthened the desire to prevent the adoption of the republican form at all costs and to avoid any territorial dismemberment into small republics, weak and in constant rivalry with one another. Given that other Latin American countries and also Portugal were becoming easy prey to European (mainly British) greed, maintaining the monarchy with a monarch of European origin acted as a deterrent and allowed Brazil to ensure the predominance of its international interests. And in fact, "after the phase of the regency, turbulent but transitory by its very nature, the imperial order dominated from above, assuring internal peace and external prestige."

For the reasons cited above, Brazil chose a representative constitutional monarchical system. The imperial regime was based on the idea that sovereignty resided in the Nation, not the State, symbolically represented by the emperor. While the Nation wished to experience freedom and prosperity, the State, in turn, wanted "permanence, duration and existence." In this form, the Constitution expressed in its text that both the Emperor and the General Assembly were representatives of the Brazilian nation. The monarch represented the constant, general interests of the nation as a whole, while the Assembly represented particular, ephemeral, momentary interests. However, the Emperor was not sovereign of the country; the sovereign was the Brazilian Nation, who delegated this role to the Emperor, as they did to the General Assembly.

=== Parliamentary system ===
A major difference between parliamentarism and presidentialism is that in the first, the Head of State and of the Government are distinct individuals, while in the second, both roles reside in a single individual. Under the Brazilian monarchy, nonetheless, the emperor was head of both the State and the Government. This basic characteristic of presidential republicanism was transplanted by the Brazilian Constitutional Order. The Constitution of 1824 was rather less parliamentary than the draft prepared by the Constituent Assembly. In fact, it was for all purposes a peculiar and unique regime: a presidential monarchy. That did not mean, by any means, that the Brazilian monarch had prerogatives resembling those of a tyrant or dictator. The individual guarantees that guarantee human liberty and dignity were inserted into the articles of the Charter and were respected. The Emperor would not act in areas reserved to the legislative branch and the judiciary, such as to create laws or to judge and sentence. Still, the creation of the Moderating Power (Portuguese: Poder Moderador) and natural evolution of Brazilian representative system enabled a transition from presidential to the parliamentary model, which "would give the Empire a position of illustrious companion next to the British lion" [the United Kingdom]. It was unnecessary to modify the letter of the law in order to transmute one system of government into another: the Constitution itself in its elasticity (in terms of legal interpretation of the Charter) enabled this.

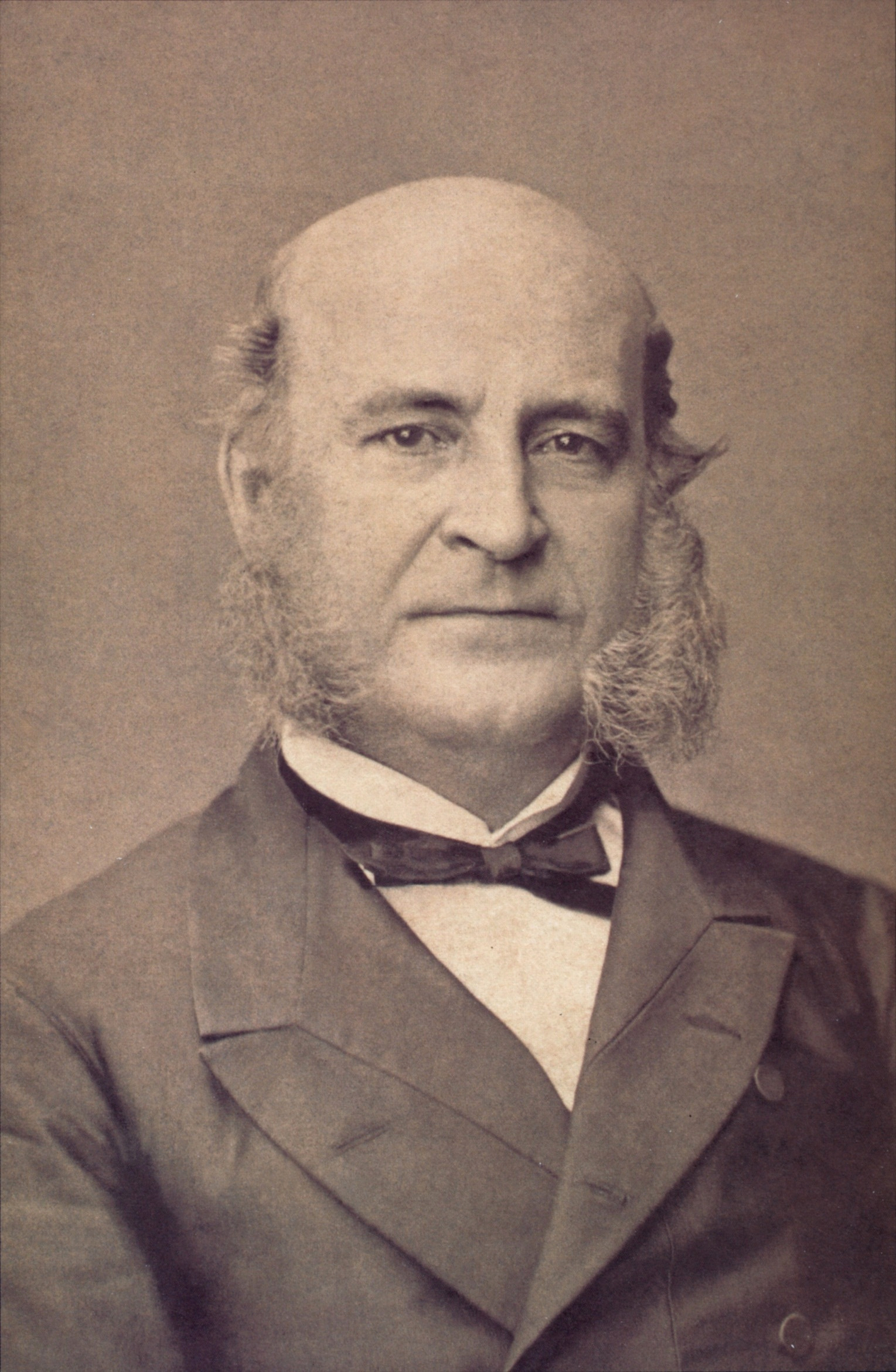
José Paranhos, Viscount of Rio Branco, usually considered the greatest President of the Council of Ministers of Brazil.

The first step in the parliamentary institution occurred in 1824, with the award of the first Brazilian constitutional charter, allowing the General Assembly (Parliament) to take a leading role in policy guidance of the nation. The second step was in 1826 when a minority deputy Bernardo Pereira de Vasconcelos successfully demanded that the ministers of state had to present the government's financial accounts before the Chamber of Deputies. The third step, the most important, was taken in 1847 when Francisco de Paula Souza demanded the creation of the office of the President of the Council of Ministers (equivalent to the prime minister, and holding executive power). These steps resulted in the consolidation of Brazilian parliamentarism, in the same manner as the consolidation of British parliamentarism, as it would facilitate the distinction between Executive Power and Moderating Power.

The Brazilian Parliament became increasingly important, as all the great political decisions took place there, providing occasion for memorable debates. By 1881, it was already a custom of the Ministers of State to present government financial accounts to the Parliament, make annual reports on their activities and attend to answer criticism by the Deputies and Senators. These acts allowed great freedom for parliamentary interplay. This did not pass without observation by foreigners. Surprising, Brazil was criticized for its broad freedom of speech and its "exaggerated parliamentarism" as it was called by the French ambassador Amelot, Count of Chaillou. In the view of foreigners, Brazilian parliamentarism was not behind its European equivalents. The Empire was "from its outset a crowned democracy, in which the executive prevailed at first, and the legislative ended up predominating".

In the Imperial Parliament there were "solid and competitive parties, an active parliament, a free press, open debate", traditions that the Old Republic did not maintain. Both the emperor and the ministers of state always sought to act with attention to Parliament, making a sincere effort to improve the country's political system by adopting characteristics inherent in Parliamentarianism. For example: the definition of the cabinet's governmental program was drafted by the President of the Council of Ministers, and was, in turn, presented by the monarch every year at the opening of the Chamber of Deputies. Another example was the emergence of the possibility that Parliament, when deemed necessary, would submit a motion of no confidence against the cabinet of ministers. This provided a mode of defense (used at exceptional moments) of the parliamentary minority against the cabinet formed by the majority, were they to act inappropriately.

=== Federalism ===
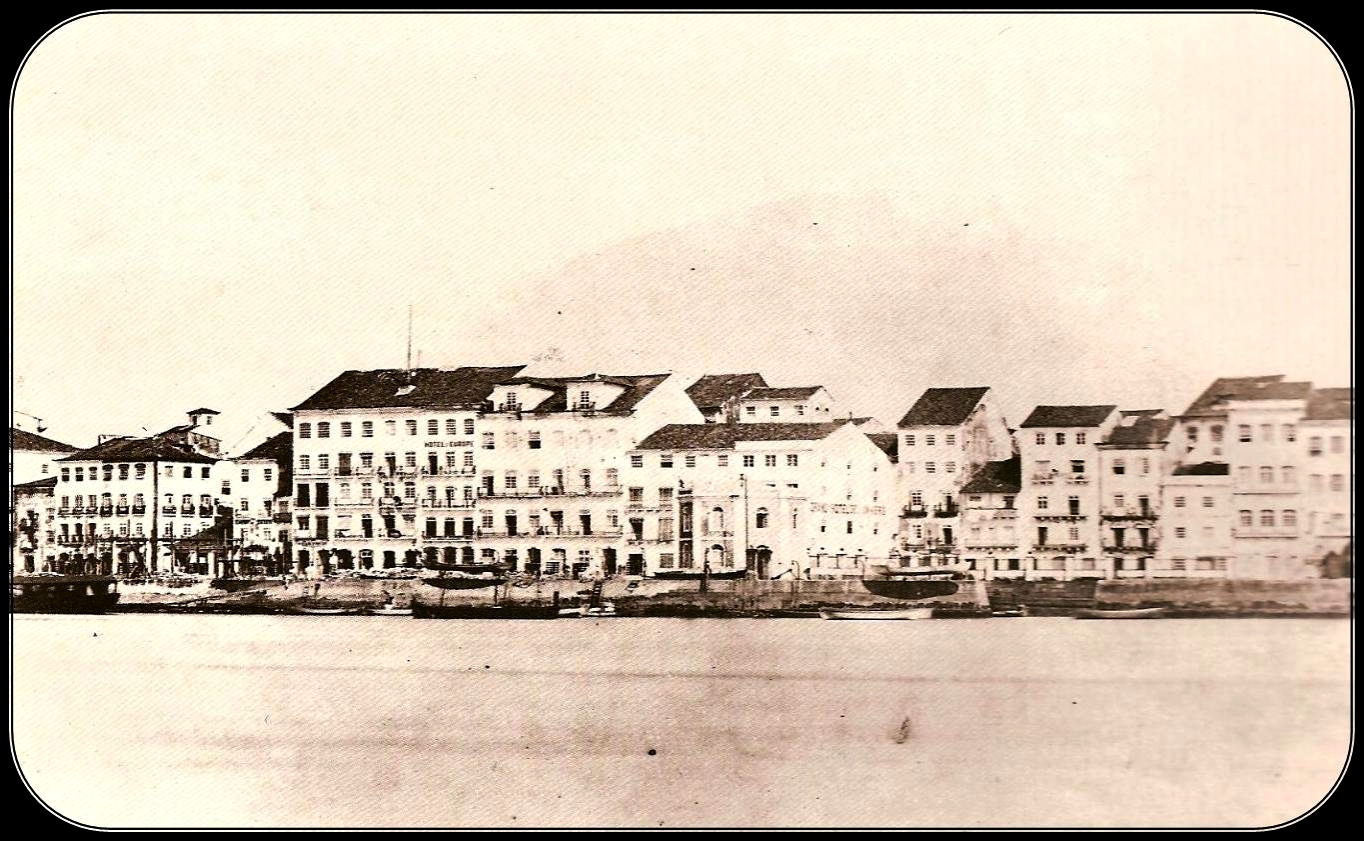
Recife, capital of Pernambuco province, 1865.

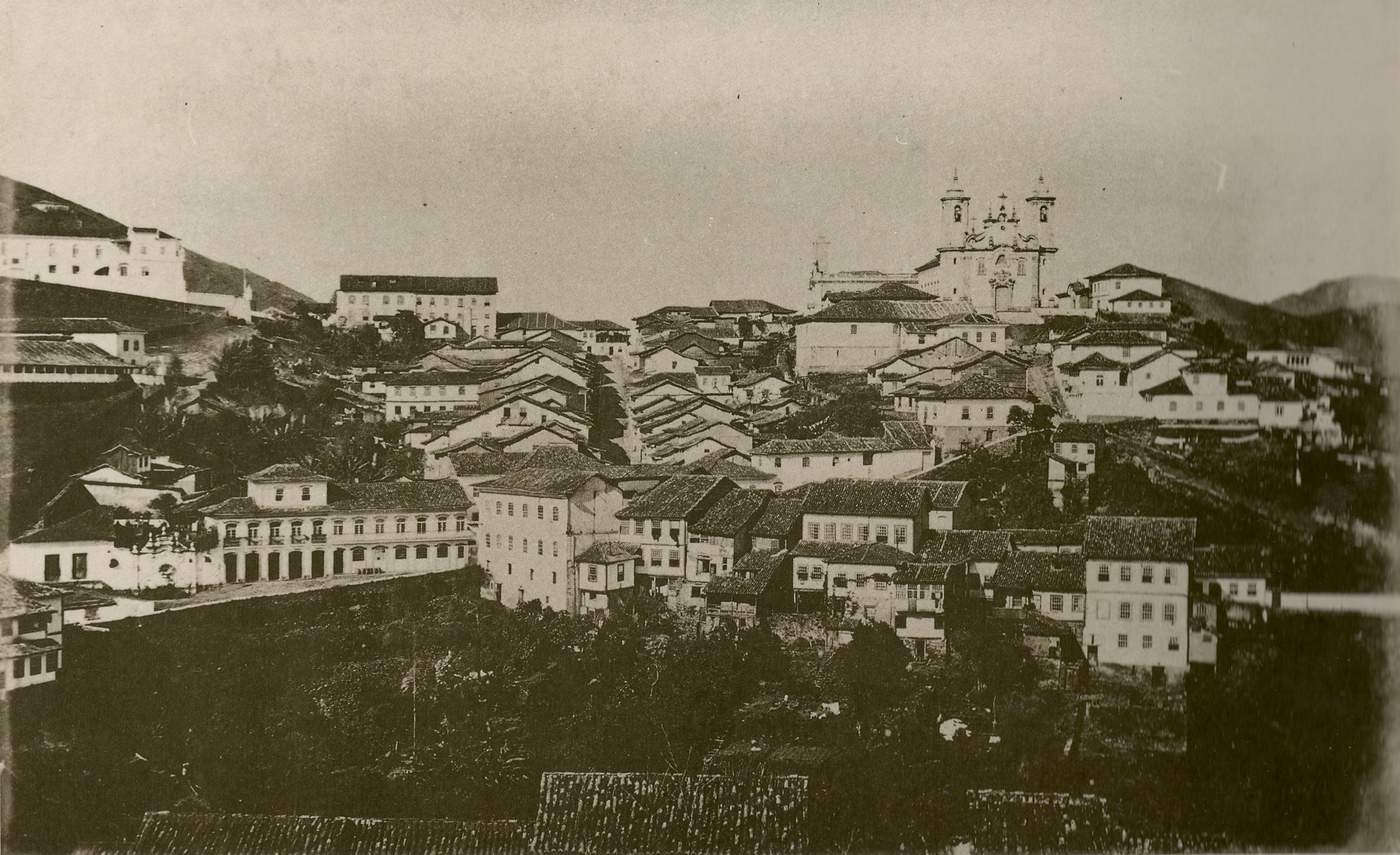
Ouro Preto, capital of Minas Gerais province, 1881.

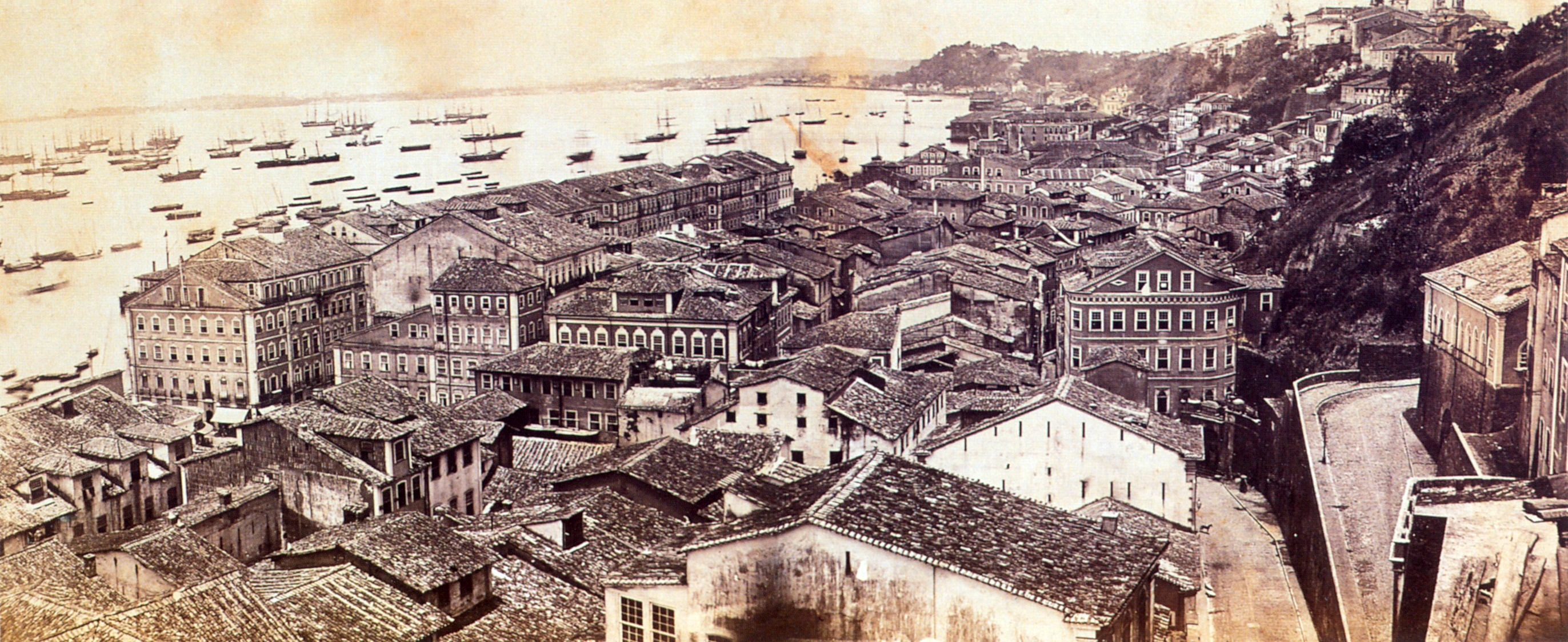
Salvador, capital of Bahia province, 1870.

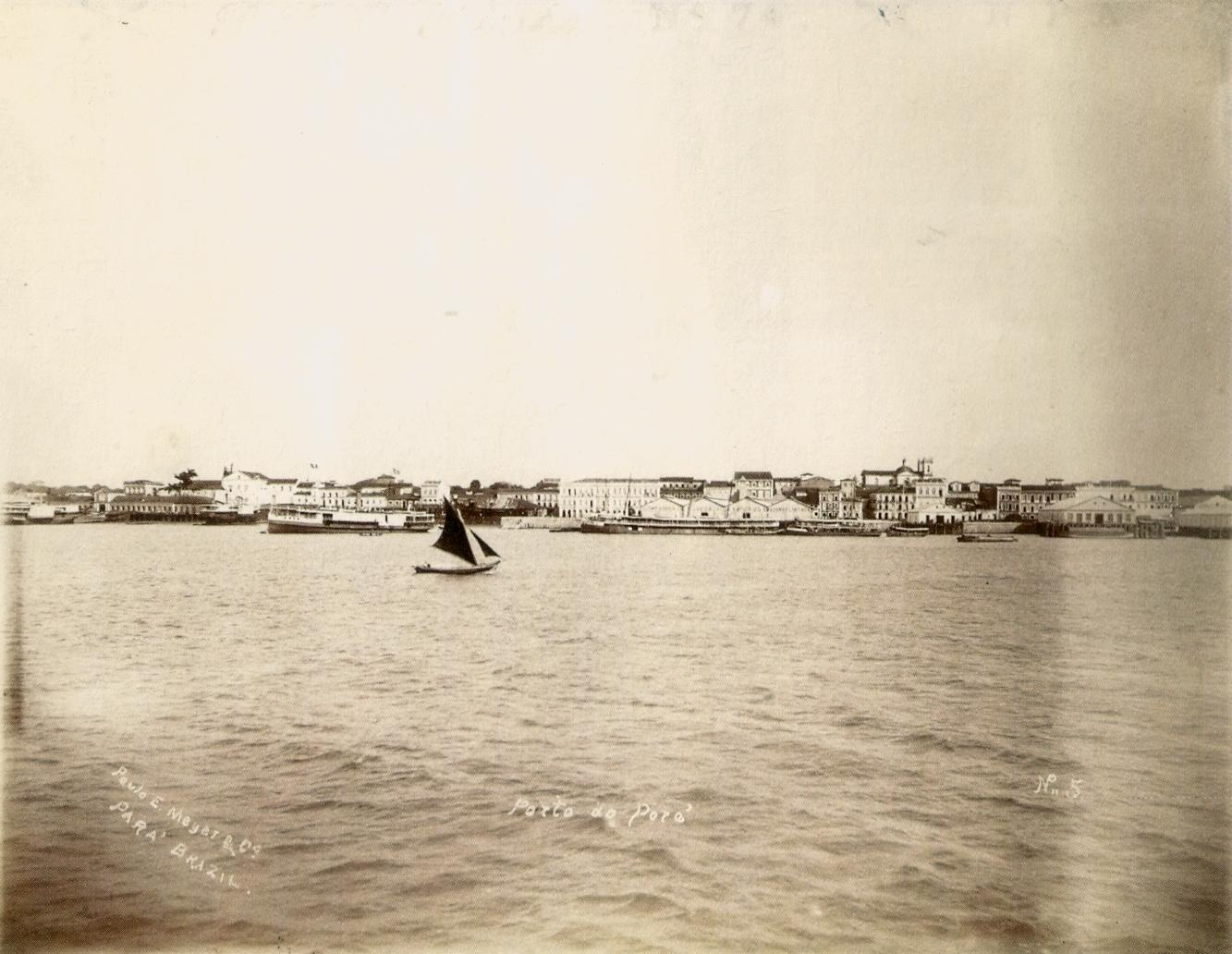
Belém, capital of Pará province, 1889.

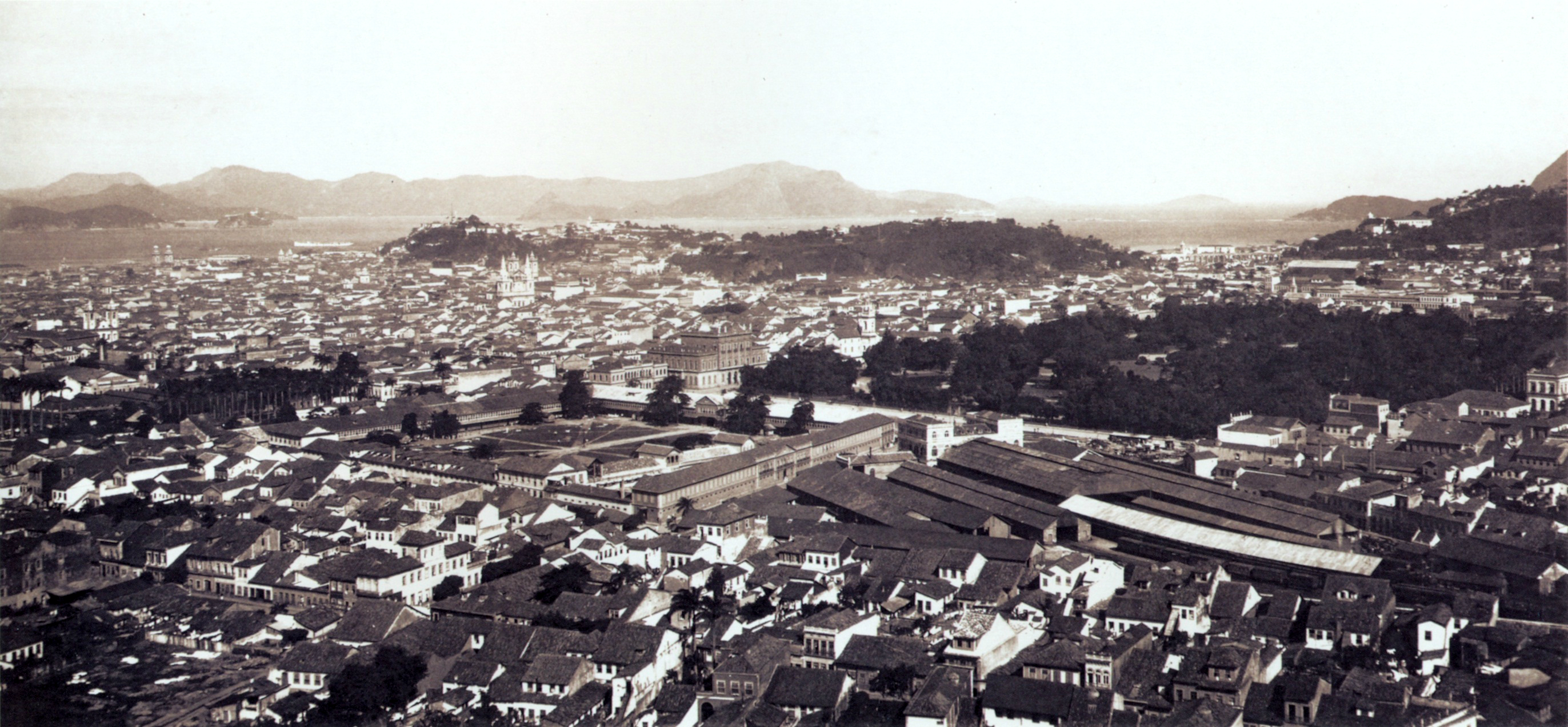
Rio de Janeiro, the imperial capital, 1889. All provinces had a great autonomy in relation to the central Government.

The imperial Constitution of 1824 made Brazil a highly centralized country, aiming to facilitate control by the central government over the provinces and thereby prevent eventual territorial dismemberment. Nonetheless, the local governments had some degree of autonomy, because municipal assemblies elected by the population had their own prerogatives. This framework changed with the approval of the 1834 Additional Act, which created the Provincial Assemblies to legislate on issues related to local administration. The Act also created an "economic and local government" that made possible to cities to "neutralize in a certain way the absolute power exercised over the provinces by their presidents". A reversal occurred in this area due to the so-called Law of Interpretation of the Additional Act, approved in 1840, which restricted the autonomy gained by the 1834 Act. Historian Maria de Fatima Silva Gouvêa wrote of the view widely held among historians, regarding the non-existence of federalism in the Empire:

Apart from some few studies published in recent years—in particular the work of Miriam Dohnikoff and Maria Fernanda Martins—very little has been produced on the subject, there remains a strong historiographical perception of the period as being marked by the existence of a monarchic State, centralized, instituted from the will and the dictates of a plantation and slaveocratic elite, over the will of the imperial Brazilian society as a whole.

Nonetheless, even after the revision of 1840, the Brazilian State retained certain characteristics of federalism, despite the fact that these were not foreseen in its founding in 1822. Because federalism was the main change proposed by the republicans and liberals in the 19th century, scholars of the subject give the impression that federalism did not exist under the monarchy. William H. Riker, one of the main theoreticians about federalism, considered that the Brazilian monarchy adopted a federalist model after the 1834 Additional Act. His view is that federalism would consist of a "division of competencies between the general government and the regional governments." The principal characteristic of federation is the mutual existence of two autonomous levels of government, in this case central and regional. This was reality during the monarchy, which would be considered a de facto federation were it not for the fact that the presidents of the provinces (equivalent to the current governors of states) were appointed by the Emperor and the Senators had a lifelong tenure. Prussian officer Max von Versen, who visited Brazil in 1867, wrote that the Emperor "shares the sovereignty with a Senate and a Chamber of Deputies [House of Representatives] that are assemblies elected by universal suffrage. In fact, the Crown does have only the ability to execute decisions of the Legislative. It is so great the administrative autonomy of the provinces, so predominant is the function of the Parliament as it is small the sphere of political attributions of the Emperor". Mirian Dohnikoff concluded that:

The constitutional division of competencies between provincial governments and the central government, guaranteeing the autonomy of the former, which could not be unilaterally revoked by the central government; the capacity of the provincial governments to make decisions autonomously about matters relative to taxation, the police force, public works, jobs, etc.; the constant negotiation between provinces and the center in parliament to reduce tensions and confrontations between divergent interpretations about the sphere of the competence of each; the attribution of the central government to respond to national unity, provided the tools necessary for both; and its coexistence with autonomous provincial governments, which accounted for strategic regional issues, were federalist factors that prevailed in nineteenth century Brazil. The defeat in the negotiations of reforms in 1832, which resulted in the maintenance of the lifelong character (Portuguese: vitaliciedade) of membership in the Senate, and the fact of the president of the province being appointed by the central government prevented the full adoption of a federal model. On the other hand, as I have tried to demonstrate, the [centrally appointed] president had limited powers, of a type that did not constitute an obstacle to the exercise of provincial autonomy. The president did not have the power to present legislative projects, and the right to veto laws approved by the Assembly was only one of suspension. It could be exercised for a limited time, only ten days, and returned then to the same Assembly that approved the law, where it could be overruled by two-thirds of the legislators.

Thus, it remained to the monarchic government to abolish the lifelong character of membership in the Senate and to allow the choice of presidents of the provinces by popular vote, to achieve federalism. Such changes would occur in 1889, when the Viscount of Ouro Preto, President of the last Council of Ministers of the monarchy, presented his government proposals to the General Assembly. But, owing to the coup d'état that installed the republic, these plans never came to fruition.

== Government of the Empire of Brazil ==
=== Moderating branch ===
==== Emperor's role ====
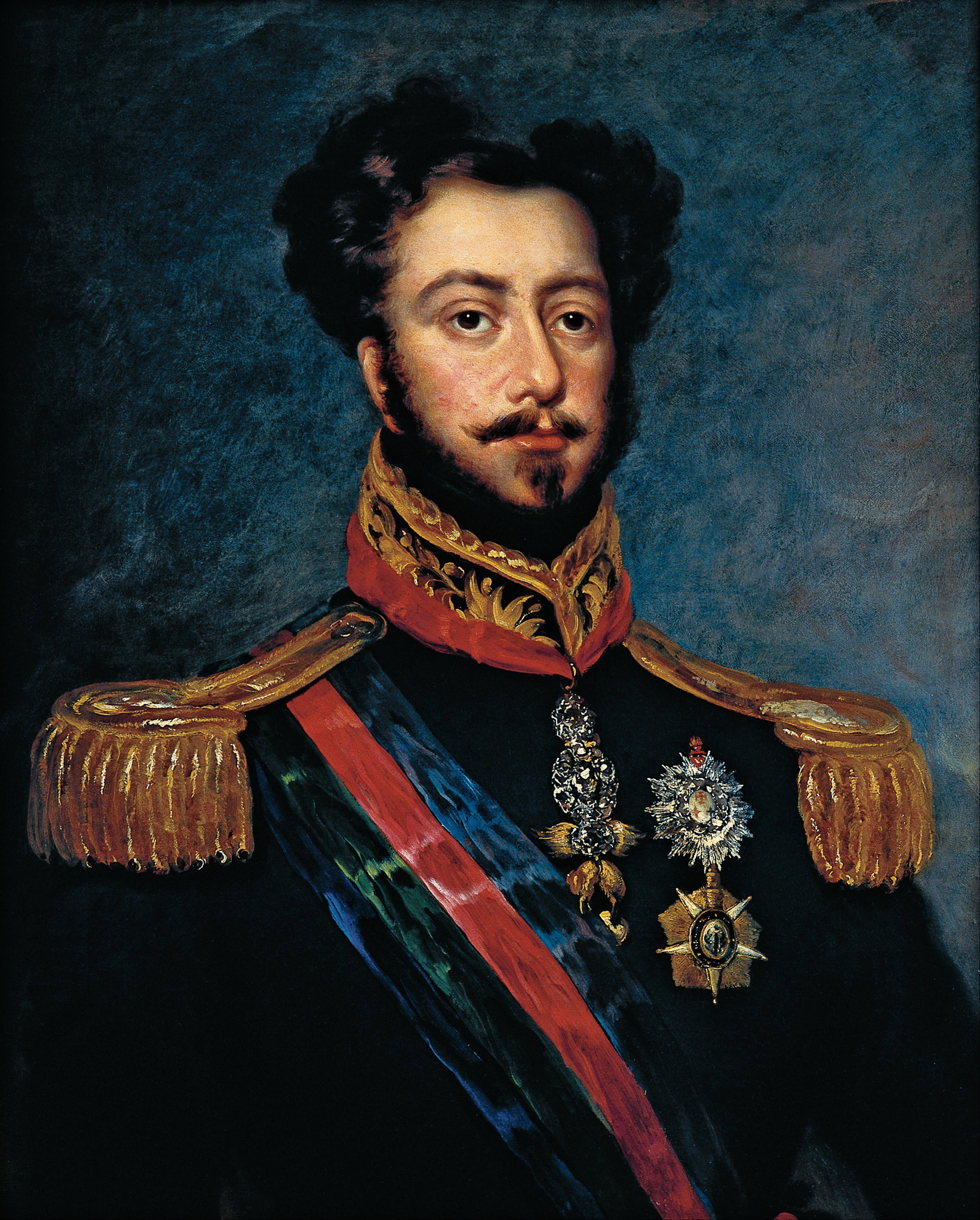
Emperor Pedro I which granted the constitution of 1824 was the creator of the moderating power

The role of the emperor of Brazil was to represent the nation. He represented that which the nation had "of oneness, of permanence, of stability. He represented the legal order, the unity of all Brazilians, as well as the variations of region, class, party, race, represented the nation in its totality." The monarch was in reality a type of "minister of a republic", in the philosophical sense of that last word, from res publica, and not a sovereign by divine right. His function as a representative of the nation, of its legitimacy, derived not from being elected, but acclaimed, as had traditionally happened for centuries after the death of the previous monarch in homage to his successor. Acclamation was a popular designation that legitimated the role of the monarchy as representative of the Brazilian people. This in fact occurred at three distinct historic moments during the monarchical era: in 1822, when Pedro I was acclaimed, in 1831 and finally in 1840, when it was the turn of Pedro II be acclaimed in all the provinces. Acclamation was, in a certain way, a type of symbolic vote, equivalent to an informal plebiscite. It was popular acceptance that granted the legitimacy to Brazilian monarchs as representatives of the Nation.

Following the standard dictated by liberalism of the nineteenth century, the Constitution of 1824 granted the monarchy protection under a representative system and protected by the most important, innovative and original item in the constitutional text: the Moderating Power (Portuguese: Poder Moderador). This fourth power was personal to the Emperor, acting as a "mechanism to absorb friction between the legislative and executive powers" and his role as the one who would maintain the balance between both powers would allow Pedro II throughout his reign the "worthy position that he exercised with so much pleasure and peace." Tobias Barreto has analyzed the Moderating Power and the parliamentary government, explained as the reason for its adoption both the fact that "institutions that are not the daughters of custom, but only the product of theories, do not hold themselves for much longer against reality and they will soon ruin themselves when faced by facts." It would not matter if there were laws that would follow the customs and traditions of other nations (other than the Brazilians) that would be admirable in theory, but in practice, would become counterproductive to the point of creating cracks that over time would collapse the edifice of the country's constitutional order. Thus, thanks to the Moderating Power, Brazil was able to "open a valve through which parliamentary anarchy could escape", in other words, it would minimize eventual damage caused by disputes between rival political factions.

According to João Camilo Torres the idea behind the Moderating Power was "that a monarch, by virtue of dynastic continuity, took no part in factions, classes, had no regional links, did not owe his power to economic groups, did not have to fulfill electoral promises, did not need to think of his own future — the future of his family was guaranteed by the preservation of peace and national greatness — he was not subject to the temptation of taking advantage of a brief passage through the government to grant benefits and advantages for himself only at the cost of the nation´s welfare and leaving the onus to his successors" as he knows that his "successor will be his own son, knowing that history, many times, charges grandchildren with the crimes of their grandparents".

==== Emperor's prerogatives ====
Article 99 of the Constitution of 1824 declared that the “person of the Emperor is inviolable and sacred; he is not subject to any responsibility”. This disposition was not characteristic only of the nineteenth century Brazilian constitutional regime. On the contrary, the lack of responsibility of the monarch continues to exist under present-day parliamentary monarchies. The powers reserved to the Moderating Power were to be exercised only after consulting the Council of State. Most of these powers (which were enumerated in Article 101) were identical to those reserved for monarchs today, such as: to summon the General Assembly (parliament) in the intervals between sessions; to sanction the decrees and resolutions of the General Assembly, for them to take on the force of law; extend or postpone the General Assembly and dissolve the Chamber of Deputies (Portuguese: Câmara de Deputados), convoking another immediately to replace the former; freely appointing and firing ministers of state; pardoning and modifying judicial sentences and granting amnesty.

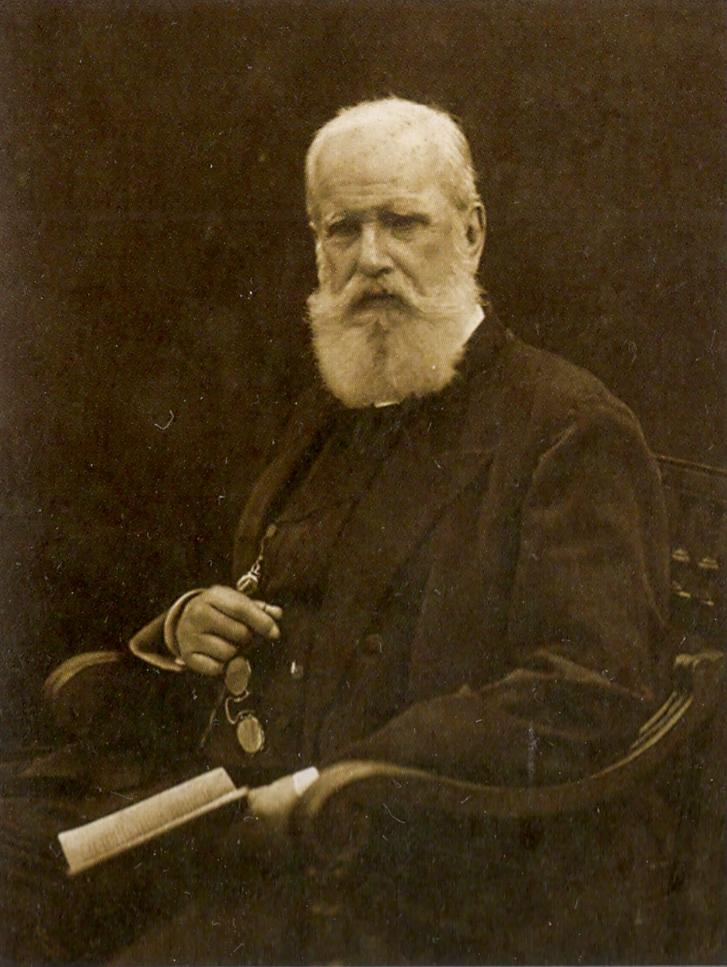
Emperor Pedro II held the Moderating Power.

The dissolution of the Chamber of Deputies should not be confused with shutting down a National Congress (or Parliament). The first refers to a legal measure that exist under Parliamentarism, while the second is a dictatorial act. There was a great care on the part of Brazilian monarchs at the time to exercise their prerogative to dissolve the Chamber of Deputies. For example, in the case of Pedro I, he did not dissolve the Chamber of Deputies or postponed the Parliament during his reign. While Pedro II, not once in his 58 years as Emperor that such dissolution occurred by his own initiative; instead, it was always solicited by the President of the Council of Ministers. There were various dissolutions during the period of his reign, eleven in all, and of these, ten occurred only after the Council of State was consulted on the matter, something that was not obligatory. The power to veto laws was not absolute, merely partial: if two consecutive legislatures presented the same legislation without modifications, the Emperor's signature would not be needed to pass it.

Among the other prerogatives of the emperor were: to suspend magistrates for complaints against their persons, but only after carrying through hearings with them, taking all the important information available, and consulting the Council of State (those magistrates effectively lost their jobs only after due process of law that resulted in a condenatory sentence after all possible appeals); approve or suspend resolutions (laws) of provincial councils and name Senators according to a list of the three candidates who had gained the majority of popular vote. The power to approve or suspend resolutions of provincial councils was extraordinary, it was the competence of the General Assembly and could only occur if that body, for some reason, was unable to meet (This prerogative was annulled by the 1834 Additional Act and the subsequent creation of the Provincial Assemblies).

As to the power of nominating Senators, that was not a characteristic peculiar to the Brazilian legal order, but to something common in all countries of that era. In the United Kingdom, the House of Lords was composed of life members and hereditary members and reserved solely to the nobility; similarly, in France, Senators, also with life terms, were named rather than elected; in the United States, a presidential republic, Senators were chosen by the state legislatures (until this was modified by the Seventeenth Amendment in 1913). None of these three countries, considered at that time to be democracies alongside Brazil, there was any popular participation in the selection of Senators. In contrast, in Brazil Senators were supposed to be named from a list of three candidates who had received the most votes from the Brazilian people.

Paulo Bonavides wrote that the Moderating Power "can only be appreciated for its role on the consolidation of national unity and the stability of the political system of the Empire" on “a continent politically flagellated by civil hatreds and pulverized into weak and rival republics.” For Galvão Sousa, the Moderating Power under Pedro II, “created the space for the famous 'dictatorship of honesty.' It soon became the personal power of the monarch, always exercised with a high public spirit”. The term "dictatorship" (Portuguese: ditadura) used by the author does not have a pejorative connotation and merely exemplifies what he perceives as the force of morality and justice that Pedro II imposed in his role as constitutional monarch.

=== Executive branch ===
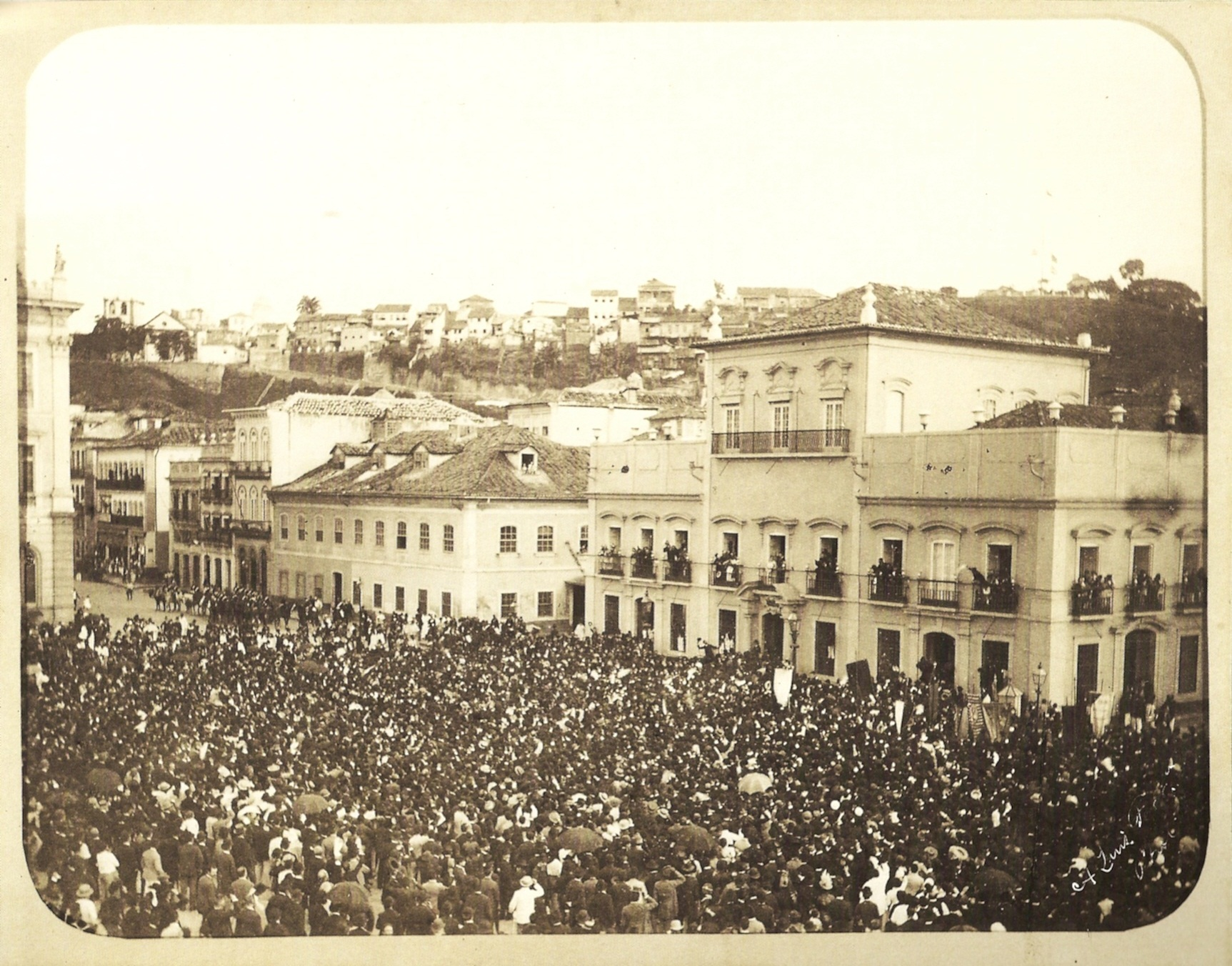
The Imperial Palace was the main government building and emperor's workplace

According article 102 of the Constitution of 1824, "the Emperor is the Head of Executive Power, and exercises it by his Ministers of State". However, in 1847 the Emperor Pedro II created the office of the President of the Council of Ministers to hold executive power, although the Emperor still possesses executive powers currently common to the Prime Minister of a monarchy. In practice, both exercised the executive function in different aspects. Through this reform, the Emperor would still be responsible for sanctioning or vetoing laws passed by the General Assembly, "convening the new Ordinary General Assembly," appointing bishops, and providing ecclesiastical benefits, appointing magistrates, and awarding titles and honors. On the other hand, the President of the Council of Ministers was in fact the head of government and responsible for appointing ministers of state and to exercise their function through them, to be responsible for diplomacy, to issue decrees, instructions and regulations and to take care of everything that concerns this, "to provide everything that concerns internal and external security, and to administer the public accounts together with the cabinet and parliament.

The president of the Council owed his position to both his party and to the Emperor, and these could sometimes come into conflict. 19th-century abolitionist leader and historian Joaquim Nabuco said that the "President of the Council in Brazil was no Russian Chancellor, Sovereign's creature, nor a British Prime Minister, made only by the trust of the [House of] Commons: the delegation of the Crown was to him as necessary and important as the delegation of the Chamber, and, to exert with safety his functions, he had to dominate the caprice, the oscillations and ambitions of the Parliament, as well as to preserve always unalterable the favor, the good will of the emperor."

=== Legislative branch ===
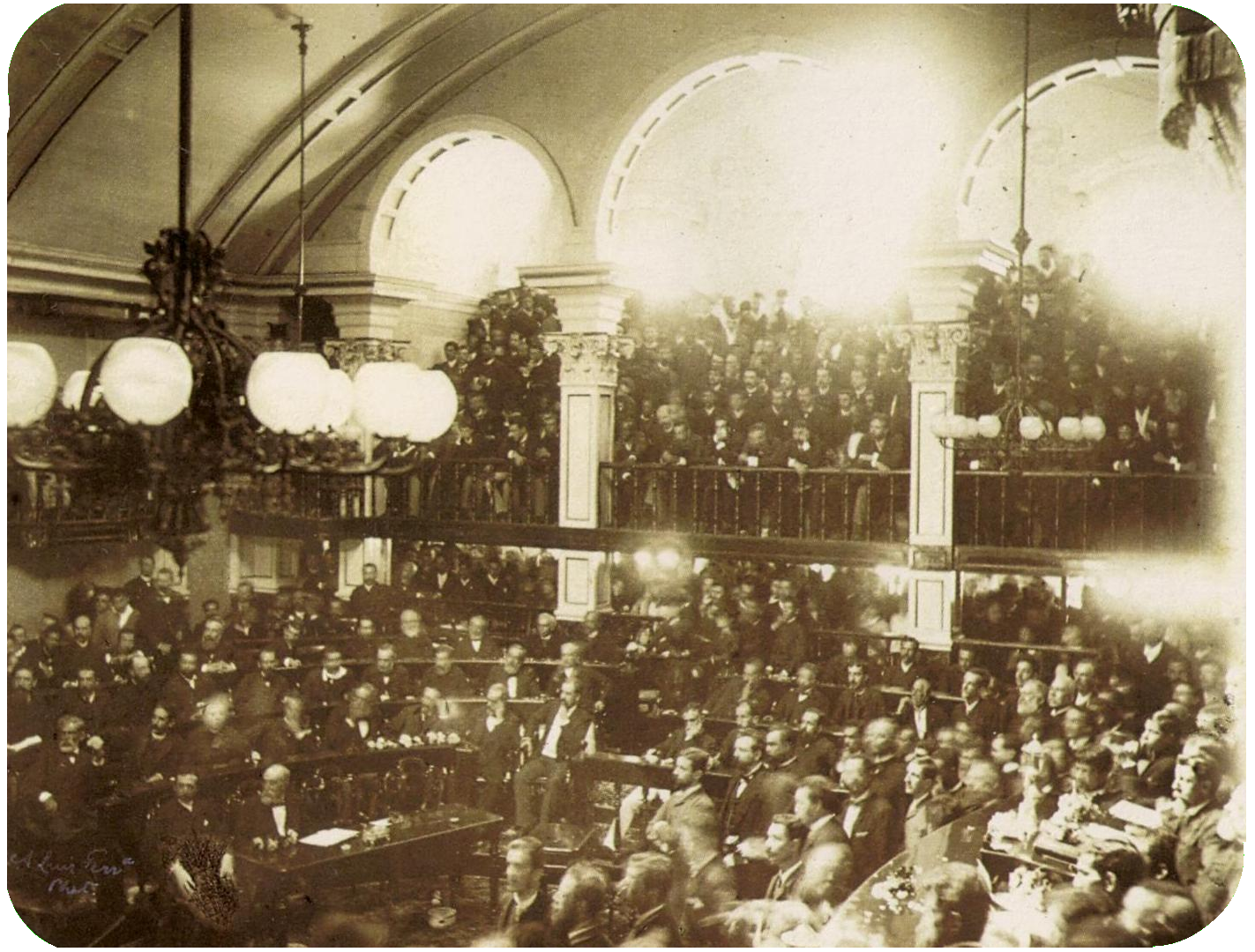
Brazilian Senate, 1888. The senators are voting on the Golden Law

According to the Constitution, Legislative power is vested upon the General Assembly, a two-chamber legislature comprising the Imperial Senate and the Chamber of Deputies which in 1824 was composed of 50 senators and 102 general deputies, as the nation's representatives.

1. The Senate is composed of lifelong members organized in election. The most voted senators are chosen and appointed by the Emperor on a triple list. Each Province will give so many senators, as many as half of their respective deputies.
2. The Chamber of Deputies is composed by elected members to serve four-year terms.

The General Assembly alone could enact, revoke, interpret and suspend laws under Article 13 of the Constitution. The legislature also held the power of the purse and was required to annually authorize expenditures and taxes. It alone approved and exercised oversight of government loans and debts. Other responsibilities entrusted to the Assembly included setting the size of the military's forces, the creation of offices within the government, monitoring the national welfare and ensuring that the government was being run in conformity to the Constitution. This last provision allowed the legislature wide authority to examine and debate government policy and conduct.

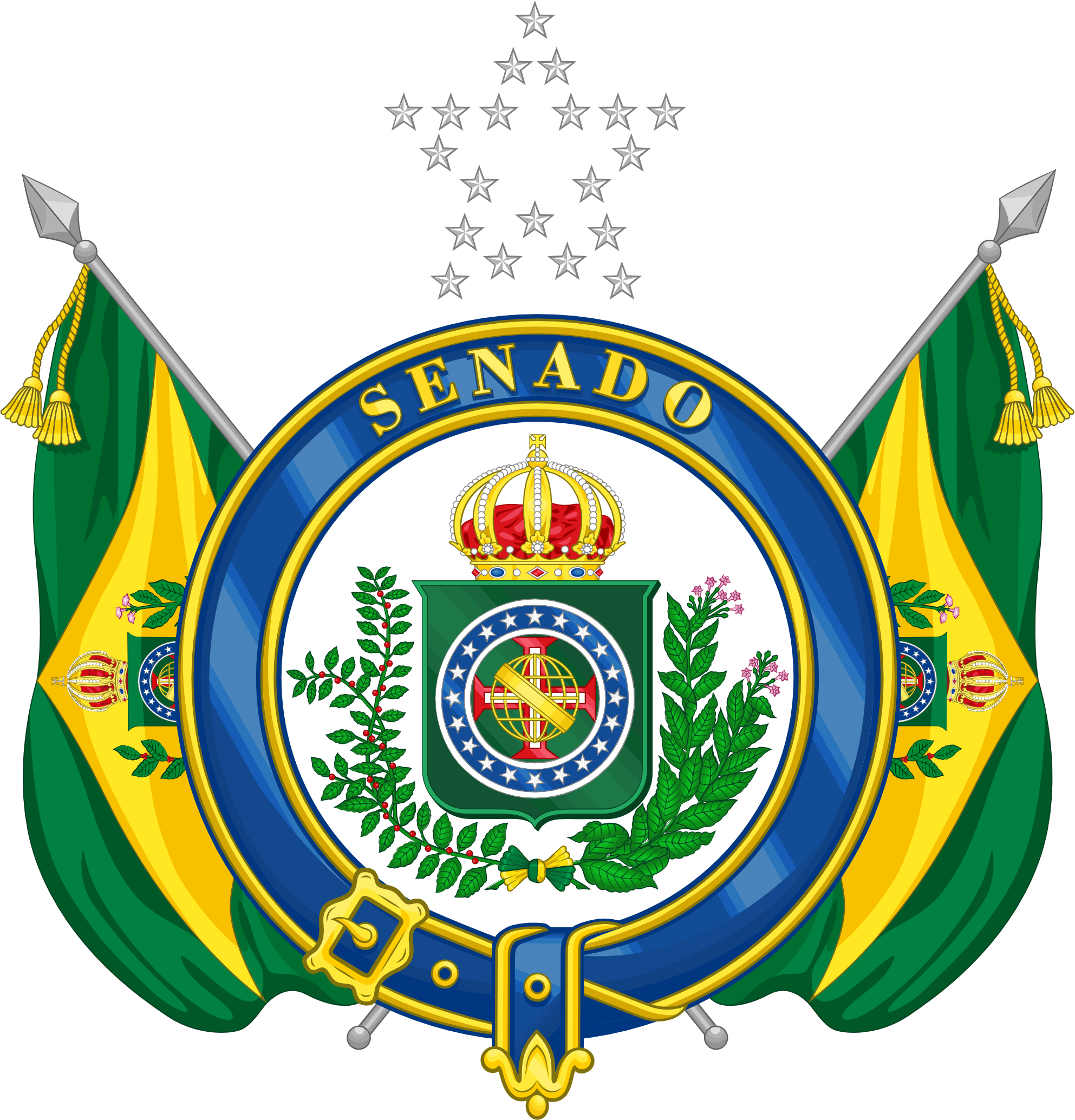
Coat of arms of the Senate.

Seal of the Chamber of Deputies .

According to Article 16 of the Constitution of 1824, "each of the Chamber will have the Treatment of Augusts and Dignified Representatives of the Nation." Each legislature lasts four years and each annual session four months. The imperial opening session of the Assembly always takes place on May 3. Both the opening and closing ceremonies will happen with the presence of the Emperor in full imperial regalia in the form of the internal regiment and in the presence of all the members of both chambers. The appointment of the respective Presidents, Vice Presidents, and Secretaries of Chambers, verification of the powers of its members, oath, and its internal police, shall be carried out in the form of its Rules of Procedure. The Members of each of the chambers are inviolable for the opinions they give in the exercise of their functions and during their deputation, they can not be arrested by any authority, except by order of their respective chamber or in flagrant crime capital punishment. Senators and deputies may be appointed to the post of Minister of State, or Councilor of State, with the difference that the Senators continue to sit in the Senate, and the Deputy leaves vacant his place of the Chamber, and proceed to New election, in which he could be re-elected and accumulate both functions. They also accumulate the two functions, if they already exercised any of the mentioned positions, when they were elected. One can not be at the same time a Member of both Houses. The exercise of any Employment, with the exception of those of Counselor of State, the Minister of State, shall cease on an interim basis, while the duties of Deputy or Senator shall last.

A Constitutional balance of power existed between the General Assembly and the executive branch under the Emperor. The legislature could not operate alone and the monarch could not force his will upon the Assembly.

=== Judicial branch ===
The independent Judiciary, and will be composed of judges, and jurors, who will have to log in this way in the civil, as in the crime in the cases, and by the way, that the Codes determine. The jurors pronounce on the fact, and the Judges apply the Law. The Emperor may suspend them for complaints against them, preceding a hearing of the same Judges, necessary information, and hearing the Council of State. All judges and bailiffs are responsible for possible abuses of power, and such as other crimes and illegal practices, can move a popular action against them that may end up disqualifying them from exercising law.

The Article 163 of the Constitution of 1824 says:

In the Capital of the Empire, in addition to the Relation, which must exist, as in the other Provinces, there will also be a Court with the name of Supreme Court of Justice, made up of Judges, drawn from Relations for their antiquities; And will be awarded the title of Council. In the first organization, the Ministers of those who are to be abolished may be employed in this Court.

— Art. 163, Imperial Constitution of 1824

The constitutional determination stated that this court should be called the "Supreme Court of Justice" and was regulated by the Imperial Letter of Law of September 18, 1828 and installed on January 9, 1829 in operation in the House of the Senate and later in the Palace of Relation. The Supreme Court of Justice was the national court acting in all instances. All of its members were directly appointed by the Emperor. Each province has also its own Tribunal of Relations to try cases in the lower court.

The judiciary is completely independent even from the Emperor. However, although it can not interfere directly, the Emperor can commute applied penalties, such as the death penalty, which was no longer executed in 1876 by successive commutations of Emperor Pedro II.

=== Provincial and local governments ===
When enacted in 1824, the Imperial Constitution created the Conselho Geral de Província (Provincial General Council), the legislature of the provinces. This council was composed of either 21 or 13 elected members, depending on the size of a province's population. All "resolutions" (laws) created by the councils required approval by the General Assembly, with no right of appeal. Provincial Councils also had no authority to raise revenues, and their budgets had to be debated and ratified by the General Assembly. Provinces had no autonomy and were entirely subordinate to the national government.

With the 1834 constitutional amendment known as the Additional Act, Provincial General Councils were supplanted by the Assembleias Legislativas Provinciais (Provincial Legislative Assemblies). The new Assemblies enjoyed much greater autonomy from the national government. A Provincial Assembly was composed of 36, 28 or 20 elected deputies, the number depending on the size of the province's population. The election of provincial deputies followed the same procedure as used to elect general deputies to the national Chamber of Deputies.

The responsibilities of the Provincial Assembly included defining provincial and municipal budgets and levying the taxes necessary to support them; providing primary and secondary schools (higher education was the responsibility of the national government); oversight and control of provincial and municipal expenditures; and providing for law enforcement and maintenance of police forces. The Assemblies also controlled the creation and abolishment of, and salaries for, positions within provincial and municipal civil services. The nomination, suspension and dismissal of civil servants was reserved for the president (governor) of the province, but how and under what circumstances he could exercise these prerogatives was delineated by the Assembly. The expropriation of private property (with due monetary compensation) for provincial or municipal interests was also a right of the Assembly. In effect, the Provincial Assembly could enact any kind of law—with no ratification by Parliament—so long as such local laws did not violate or encroach upon the Constitution. However, provinces were not permitted to legislate in the areas of criminal law, criminal procedure laws, civil rights and obligations, the armed forces, the national budget or matters concerning national interests, such as foreign relations.

The provincial presidents were appointed by the national government and were, in theory, charged with governing the province. In practice, however, their power was intangible, varying from province to province based upon each president's relative degree of personal influence and personal character. Since the national government wanted to ensure their loyalty, presidents were, in most cases, sent to a province in which they had no political, familial or other ties. In order to prevent them from developing any strong local interests or support, presidents would be limited to terms of only a few months in office. As the president usually spent a great deal of time away from the province, often traveling to their native province or the imperial capital, the de facto governor was the vice-president, who was chosen by the Provincial Assembly and was usually a local politician. With little power to undermine provincial autonomy, the president was an agent of the central government with little function beyond conveying its interests to the provincial political bosses. Presidents could be used by the national government to influence, or even rig, elections, although to be effective the president had to rely on provincial and local politicians who belonged to his own political party. This interdependency created a complex relationship which was based upon exchanges of favors, private interests, party goals, negotiations, and other political maneuvering.

The câmara municipal (town council) was the governing body in towns and cities and had existed in Brazil since the beginning of the colonial period in the 16th century. The Chamber was composed of vereadores (councilmen), the number of which depended on the size of the town. Unlike the Provincial General Council, the Constitution gave town councils great autonomy. However, when the Provincial Assembly replaced the Provincial General Council in 1834, many of the powers of town councils (including the setting of municipal budgets, oversight of expenditures, creation of jobs, and the nomination of civil servants) were transferred to the provincial government. Additionally, any laws enacted by the town council had to be ratified by the Provincial Assembly—but not by Parliament. While the 1834 Additional Act granted greater autonomy to the provinces from the central government, it transferred the towns' remaining autonomy to the provincial governments. There was no office of mayor, and towns were governed by a town council and its president (who was the councilman who won the most votes during elections)

== Elections ==
=== Overview ===
According to the Constitution of 1824, one of the most liberal of its time, voting was obligatory and elections occurred in two steps: in first phase, voters chose Electors. The Electors then chose senators (members of the upper house), deputies (members of the lower house), provincial deputies (members of the Provincial Assemblies) and councilmen (members of the town's assembly). All the men 25 years of age or older could vote in the first phase with an income of at least Rs 100$000 per year or more, with some exceptions; married men 21 years of age or older could vote, as well. To be an Elector, it was necessary to have an income of at least Rs 200$000 per year.

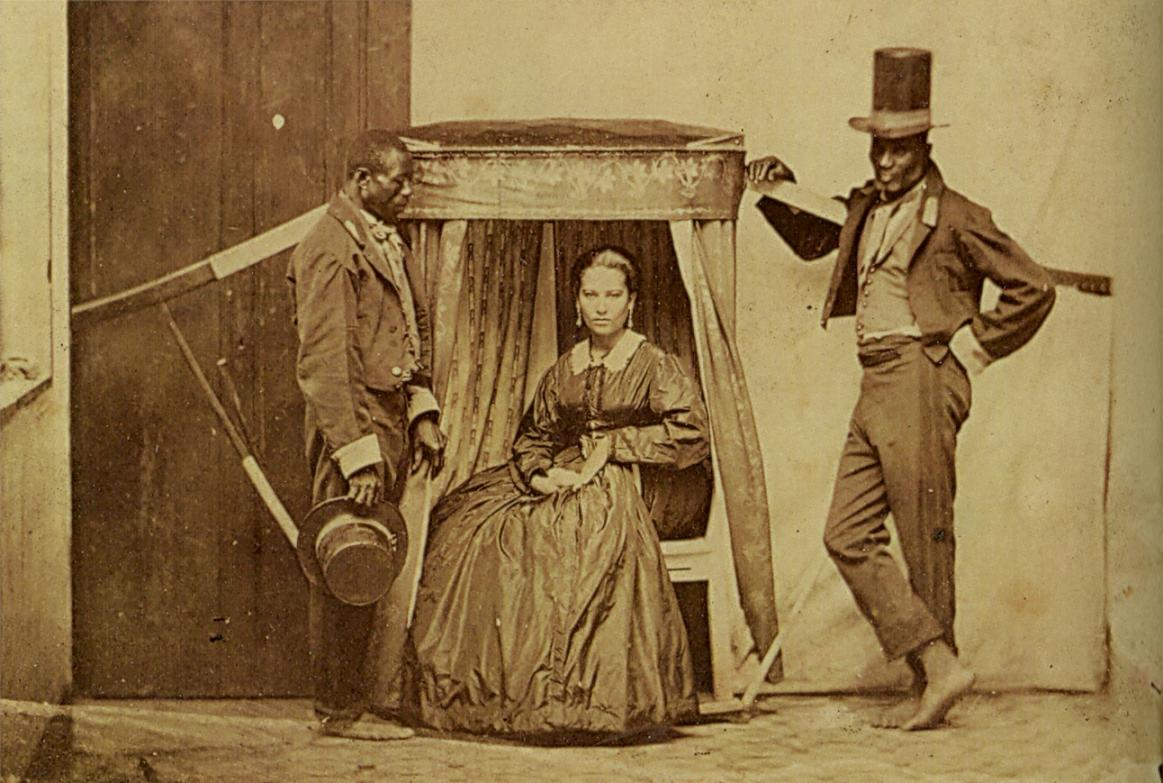
Neither women nor slaves were allowed to vote in Brazil in the 19th Century.

The income requirement was much higher in the United Kingdom even after the 1832 reform. The only countries at the time that did not require a certain income to vote were France and Switzerland, where universal suffrage was introduced only in 1848. It is probable that no European country at the time had such liberal legislation as Brazil. The income requirement was low enough that, effectively, any employed male citizen could vote. For comparison, in 1876 the civil employee with the lowest wage at the time, a janitor working in the public sector, earned Rs 600$000 annually.

Most voters in Brazil had a low income. In 1876, for example, in the town of Formiga, in the province of Minas Gerais, the poor were 70% of the electorate and in Irajá, in the province of Rio de Janeiro, they were 87%. Ex-slaves couldn't vote, but their children and grandchildren could, as could the illiterate (which few countries allowed). In 1872, 13% of the free Brazilian population voted. For comparison, in 1870 in the UK, electoral participation was 7% of the total population; in Italy, it was 2%; in Portugal, 9%; and in the Netherlands 2.5%. In 1832, the year of the British electoral reform, 3% of the British voted. Further reforms in 1867 and 1884 managed to expand electoral participation in the UK to 15%.

Although electoral fraud was common, it did not pass unobserved by Pedro II, or the politicians and experts of that time, who considered it a great problem to be resolved. Some measures, like the electoral reforms of 1855, 1875 and 1881, had been taken with intention to eliminate, or at least to diminish, fraud.

=== Electoral reforms ===
The Law of 19 September 1855 created the district vote and incompatibilities (also known as non-eligibility). The first one had as objective to make possible the representation of all the local factions, while the latter had the purpose of reducing the influence of the government (independent of what party was in power) in the result of the elections. Beyond these new features, it was forbidden that public officials campaign in their own districts, as a measure to prevent them from using public resources for their own political benefit. As a consequence, presidents of provinces, as well as provincial secretaries, military, judges and chiefs of police were prohibited from running in the district where they served, although they could still run in a different district. The positive results of the reform were already apparent in the immediate following elections, in 1856: prior to that time, such officials constituted the majority of new members of Parliament. The reduction in their numbers allowed the “real country"(the Brazilian people) to enter “directly into the Parliament"(that is, a true representative democracy), as was desired by Honório Hermeto Carneiro Leão.

The next reform occurred in 1875, when a mechanism was introduced that would make possible the representation of minorities (eliminating once and for all the ignominious unanimous assemblies): the system of the third, where the voters chose only 2/3 of the list of voters of the province, and in turn, the voters voted in 2/3 of the number of provincial deputies (provincial members of the house of representatives), thus allowing that the remaining 1/3 was filled by the votes of the opposition.

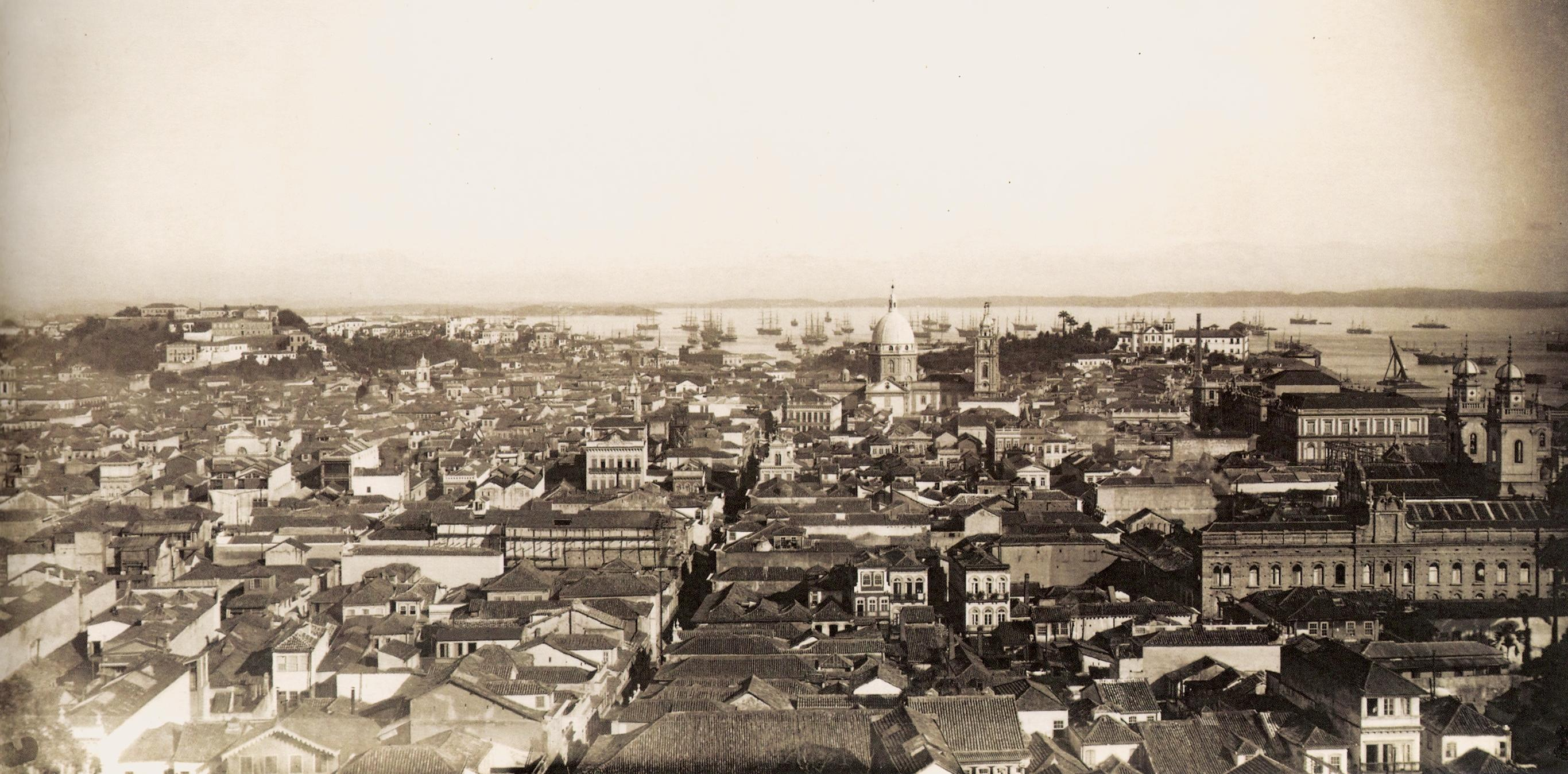
For its time, elections in Brazil were very democratic.

The last and the most important reform, known as "Saraiva Law" (in homage to the then Prime Minister, José Antônio Saraiva) brought significant changes, because it eliminated the election in two turns, introducing the direct and facultative vote and allowed the votes of ex-slaves, as well as of non-Catholics. Also, it extended the electoral incompatibilities (non-eligibility) of 1855, forbidding campaigning by entrepreneurs of public works and vicars and bishops in their own parishes, and established that elect public officials elected in other districts than their own could not exercise their public positions, receive wages or be promoted while their mandates lasted. The effects of the reform were felt immediately, because while in 1850 something like 48% of the members of the house of representatives were public officers, in the last legislature this percentage fell to only 8%. If, on one hand, the reform diminished corruption and electoral fraud, allowing the Brazilian parliamentary system to work better, it also had negative effects, as the illiterate were no longer allowed to vote. The people's participation in elections dropped from 13% of the total population to only 0.8% in 1886. However, in the first legislature after the reform, the conservative opposition had 39% of the seats. In the second, it had 44% while the republicans had 2%. In the third legislature, the liberals were opposition in that moment and had 18% of all seats.

In 1889 about 20% of the Brazilian population could read and write, so depriving the illiterate of the franchise does not explain the reason for the sudden fall of the electorate. Possibly, it occurred because voting was no longer obligatory, which, together with the lack of interest of the Brazilian people in exerting their rights of citizenship, may have resulted in the reduction in the number of voters (which would continue until the middle of the 1940s).

To many Brazilians at that time, the greatest issue about their elections was their belief that the illiterate didn't have capacity to vote, on the grounds that the illiterate were unaware of the notion of the meaning of a representative government, of the choice of somebody as its representative and were easily corruptible, usually selling their votes. To Pedro II, the best way to resolve the problem about the electoral fraud was not restricting the right to vote but, instead, improving education in the country. Even so, Brazil was capable of keeping uninterrupted elections from 1822 to 1889, strengthening the electoral process, as well the representative system, a record matched in the Americas only by the United States and Canada.

== See also ==
- Empire of Brazil
- President of the Council of Ministers of Brazil
