= L. C. Cameron =

Brazilian biochemist

L. C. Cameron (Rio de Janeiro, 1962) is a Brazilian biochemist. He is known for his studies in the field of Biochemistry, working mainly on topics such as ammonia and amino acid metabolism in situations of physiological and pathophysiological stress.

He is a Professor Emeritus at the Federal University of the State of Rio de Janeiro, where he was a full professor of Genetics and Molecular Biology and Head of the Department of Genetics and Molecular Biology (UNIRIO, 1989–2024). The scientist was also co-responsible for the creation of the Olympic Laboratory of the Brazilian Olympic Committee where he directed the Department of Biochemistry and Sports (2006–2018).

He is an Associate Scientist at the Krembil Research Institute of the University Health Network.

== Personal life ==
Son of a systems analyst and a statistician, he grew up in Rio de Janeiro. From an early age, he was interested in science, first in chemistry and later in Physics, the subject of his first higher education course.;

== Academic training and research ==
He began his scientific career while still an undergraduate, when he became interested in Biochemistry. He joined the team at Professor Mauro Velho de Castro Faria's laboratory.

He completed his master's and doctorate in Biological Chemistry at the Department of Medical Biochemistry (currently IBqM) of the Federal University of Rio de Janeiro (1989–1997). Supervised by Martha M. Sorenson, he received a scholarship from the Coordenação de Aperfeiçoamento de Pessoal de Nível Superior (CAPES) working on molecular motors.

In 1997, months after finishing his doctorate, he began leading and coordinating the Protein Biochemistry Laboratory (LBP). In 2012, with a significant contribution of federal funds, he founded the Center for Innovation in Mass Spectrometry (IMasS-LBP). Due to the group's proposals for innovation in science and technology, Waters Corporation recognized IMasS-LBP as one of its Waters Centers of Innovation in the world, which brings together scientists who, in partnership with the company, use liquid chromatography and mass spectrometry to decipher the mysteries of science. In addition to the recognition for the research developed at LBP, the laboratory was also named a Merck-Sigma-Aldrich Reference Laboratory.

He was invited to join the group to implement the Olympic Laboratory to be built for the 2007 Pan American Games. He coordinated the Department of Biochemistry and Sportomics (2006–18), which provided numerous pieces of equipment and scholarships, as well as a new facility for monitoring and preparing elite athletes until 2018. He coined the research approach called "Sportomics", which uses "-omics" sciences and classic clinical laboratory analyses (such as enzymatic assays, ELISA, Western Blot, and other analytical procedures) to understand the changes induced by sports. The approach has attracted the attention of the scientific community and the corporate world, and currently, "Sportomics" articles have more than 1000 citations.

L. C. Cameron has also supported athletes in partnership with the Brazilian Olympic Laboratory (COB) of the Brazilian Olympic Committee (COB), having worked with elite athletes in more than 50 sports disciplines and with professional football teams around the world. During his career, he has worked in international competitions, such as the 2009 Lusophony Games, 2010 South American Games, 2011 Pan American Games, 2012 Summer Olympics, Santiago South American Games, Toronto Pan American Games, 2016 Summer Olympics, Southeast Asian Games, 2020 Summer Olympics, World Cup, UEFA Champions League, Premier League, Ukrainian Premier League and Copa Libertadores.

L.C. Cameron has published over 100 articles in international journals, including Nature and the British Medical Journal. He has also edited one book and written book chapters. He is an associate editor of scientific journals and serves as a reviewer for over 60 journals.

The biochemist has worked for over 25 years as a consultant in doping cases, due to his knowledge of metabolism and mass spectrometry. In his work, he has acted in the defense of almost 80 doping cases, including Paolo Guerrero, Gabigol, Gabriel Santos, Rafaela Silva e Fred Santos.

In 2020, he was assigned by UNIRIO to assume the presidency of the Brazilian Doping Control Authority (ABCD) after being invited by the special secretary of Sports of the Ministry of Citizenship, Marcelo Magalhães. The position was not filled by the professor due to the COVID-19 pandemic, having resumed his duties at the University after six months.

Due to his work with Sportomics and its interaction with inflammatory diseases, he was invited to work in the Division of Rheumatology of the Department of Medicine at University Health Network (UHN), where he works with psoriasis and psoriatic arthritis.

== Awards ==
For his contributions to science, he received numerous awards and honors, including:

- Bruce Alberts Award for Excellence in Science Education (2012)
- Medal of Honor for Sports Merit of the State of Mato Grosso (2013);
- Military Sports Merit Medal awarded by the Ministry of Defense (2014);
- Olympic Torch Bearer (2016);
- Medal of Honor for Merit awarded by the Italian National Olympic Committee (2018);
