= Bom Dia Brasil =

Brazilian breakfast TV programme

- Created by: Central Globo de Jornalismo
- Directed by: Ricardo Vilella; Miguel Athayde
- Presented by: Ana Paula Araújo; Sabina Simonato (SP); Heraldo Pereira (DF); Aline Aguiar (MG); Cecília Malan (London); Débora Gares (sports)
- Opening theme: Instrumental
- Country of origin: Brazil
- Original language: Portuguese

Production
- Running time: 60 minutes

Original release
- Network: TV Globo
- Release: January 3, 1983 – present

Bom Dia Brasil (pronounced [bõ ˈdʒi.ɐ bɾaˈziw]; Portuguese for 'Good Morning Brazil') is a Brazilian early morning programme produced and broadcast by TV Globo. The show includes segments from studios around Brazil, moderated by the main presenters in the home studio. The show includes Brazilian political and economic news. It is currently presented by Ana Paula Araújo.

It airs Monday to Friday, at 8:30 am.

== History ==
Bom Dia premiered on 3 January 1983 with presenter Carlos Monforte, broadcast to Brasília. Initially, Bom Dia only covered political and economic issues in Brasília and there was no time for other topics.

The format of the show remained largely unchanged until March 29, 1996. With the debut of Intercine, there was a change of schedule: Bom Dia started to be shown at 7:30 a.m. and Bom Dia Praça at 7:00 a.m.

On 21 January 2019, the programme started to be broadcast between 8:00 am and 9:00 am, 30 minutes longer than the previous 8:00 am to 8:30 am. schedule.

On 5 August 2019, Bom Dia started using a new format as well as new scenery, music, and graphics.

== Main presenters ==
The current affairs news program is anchored by Ana Paula Araújo in Rio de Janeiro, and features live appearances by Sabina Simonato (São Paulo), Heraldo Pereira (Brasília),Aline Aguiar (Belo Horizonte) and Cecília Malan(London). It also features Miriam Leitão and Gerson Camarotti commenting on economics and politics topics respectively, Débora Gares bringing the latest sports news and Thaís Luquesi presenting the weather forecast.
