= List of former programs broadcast on TV Globo =

This is a list of television programs formerly broadcast on TV Globo (formerly known as Rede Globo) in Brazil.

== National network newscasts ==
- Jornal Amanhã (1975-1979)
- Jornal da Noite (1974)
- Jornal de Verdade (1966-1969)
- Jornal Internacional (1972-1975)
- Jornal Nacional 2ª Edição (1981-1982)
- Jornal de Vanguarda (1966)
- Manchete (1966)
- Se a Cidade Contasse (1965)
- Tele Globo (1965-1966)
- Ultranotícias (1966-1967)

== Local newscasts ==
- Jornal das Sete (replaced by Praça TV 2ª Edição; 1979-1983)
- Praça TV 3ª Edição (1983-1989)
- Praça TV - Edição de Domingo (1984-1987)

== Informative bulletins ==
- A Cidade Contra o Crime (1966)
- Fique por Dentro (1991-1995)
- Globo em Dois Minutos (1970-1971)
- Globo Cidade (local)
  - 1982-1997 for MG
  - 1982-2008 for PE
  - 1982-2012 for RJ
  - 1982-2013 for SP
  - 1982-2014 for DF
- Globo Notícia (2007–2014)
- Momento Rural (1984)
- Plantão Globo (1974; 1974; 1976)
- Jornalismo Eletrônico (local) (1976-1978)
- Última Edição (1971-1972)

== Journalistic programs ==
- A Palavra é Sua (1987-1988; 1989)
- Agenda (1968-1966)
- Amaral Netto, o Repórter (1968-1983)
- Brasileiros (2010)
- Bem Estar (2011-2019)
- A Cidade Contra o Crime (1966)
- Combate ao Coronavírus (2020)
- Contagem Regressiva (1995)
- Domingo Gente (1966)
- Domingo Urgente (1967-1968)
- Globo Economia (1987-1989)
- Globo Mar (2010-2013)
- Globo Revista (1981-1982)
- Globo Shell Especial (1971-1973)
- Ibrahim Sued Repórter (1966-1974)
- Jornal da Semana (1966)
- Linha Direta (1990; 1999-2007; 2023-2024)
- O Globo Especial (1971)
- O Pequeno Mundo de Otto Lara Resende (1967)
- Ordem do Dia (1968-1971)
- Otto Zero Hora (1966)
- Painel (1977-1978)
- Primeiro Plano (1965-1966)
- Plantão da Madrugada (1982-1983)
- O Povo e o Presidente (1982-1983)
- Só o Amor Constrói (1973)
- Show da Cidade (1966-1968)
- Show das Eleições (1982)
- Tele-semana (1965)
- Terra de Nossa Gente (1965-1966)

== Children's programming ==
- Angel Mix (1996-2000)
- As Aventuras de Eduardinho (1966-1968)
- Balão Mágico (1983-1986)
- Bambuluá (2000-2001)
- Capitão Furacão (1965-1970)
- Clube do Titio (1966-1968)
- Gente Inocente (2000-2002)
- Globinho (1972-1974; 1974-1982)
- Globo Cor Especial (1973-1983)
- Lilico & Cócegas (1969-1970)
- Minicarros (1974-1975)
- O Mundo Mágico de Alakazan (1965)
- Radical Chic (1993)
- Sandy & Junior (1999-2002)
- Show do Mallandro (1992-1993)
- Sítio do Picapau Amarelo (1977-1986; 2001-2007; 2012-2014 Seasons 1 and 2 Only)
- TV Colosso (1993-1997)
- Uni-Duni-Tê (1965-1968)
- Vila Sésamo (Brazilian version of Sesame Street, co-produced with TV Cultura; 1972-1977)
- Xou da Xuxa (first program hosted by Xuxa on Globo; 1986-1992)
- Bobeou Dançou (1989)
- Paradão da Xuxa (1992)
- Programa Xuxa (1993)
- Xuxa Park (1994-2001)
- Planeta Xuxa (1997-2002)
- Xuxa no Mundo da Imaginação (2002-2004)
- TV Xuxa (2005-2007)
- Conexão Xuxa (2007-2008)
- Zás Trás (1965-1970; 1972)
- Dragon Ball (1987-1991, anime)
- Festival de Desenhos (1987–2015)
- Desenho Especial (1970-2018)
- A Turma do Didi (1998-2010)
- TV Globinho (2000-2015)

== Variety and talk shows ==
- Réveillon do Faustão (yearly; 1991-1996)
- Som Brasil (1981–1989; 1993–1999; 2007–2013)
- Esquenta! (2011-2017)
- Muvuca (1998-2000)
- Ponto a Ponto (1996)
- Central da Periferia (2006)
- Estrelas (2006-2018)
- Adnight (2016-2017)
- Amor & Sexo (2009-2018)
- Não Fuja da Raia (1995; 1996)
- Jovens Tardes (2002-2004)
- Estação Globo (2004-2009)
- Por Toda Minha Vida (2006-2011)
- Sai do Chão (2014-2015)
- The Masked Singer Brasil (2021-2025)
- Pipoca da Ivete (2022-2023)

== Comedy ==
- Chico Total (1981-1996)
- Faça humor, não faça guerra (1970-1973)
- A Grande Família (1972–1975; 2001-2014)
- Os Trapalhões (1977-1995; 2017)
- Brasil Legal (1994-1997)
- Viva o Gordo (1981-1987)
- TV Pirata (1988-1990; 1992)
- Estúdio A... Gildo (1982)
- Escolinha do Professor Raimundo (1990-1995; 2001; 2015-2020)
- Estados Anysios de Chico City (1991)
- Chico Anysio Show (1982-1990)
- Chico Total (1981; 1996)
- Toma Lá, Dá Cá (2005, 2007-2009)
- Doris para Maiores (1991)
- Vida ao Vivo Show (1998-1999)
- Tá no Ar: A TV na TV (2014-2019)
- Programa Legal (1991-1992)
- Garotas do Programa (2000)
- Zorra Total (1999-2015)
- Casa do Terror (1995)
- Muvuca (1998-2000)
- Sexo Frágil (2003-2004)
- Fora de Hora (2020)
- Megatom (2000-2001)
- Sai de Baixo (1996-2002;2013)
- Casseta & Planeta, Urgente! (1992-2010)
- Casseta & Planeta Vai Fundo (2012)
- A Diarista (2004-2007)
- O Belo e as Feras (1999)
- Divertics (2013-2014)
- Sob Nova Direção (2004-2007)
- Junto e Misturado (2010, 2013)
- A Turma do Didi (1998-2010)
- Os Normais (2001-2003)
- Os Caras de Pau (2006-2013)
- Zorra (2015-2020)
- Tomara Que Caia (2015)
- Aventuras do Didi (2010-2012)
- Planeta dos Homens (1976--1982)
- Tô Nessa! (2024-2025)
- Aberto ao Público (2025-2026)
- Praça da Alegria (1957-1979)
- Satiricom (pt:Satiricom, 1972-1975)

== International Series ==
- 2020s
  - 24 Horas: O Legado
  - A Million Little Things (Um Milhão de Coisas)
  - Twisted: A Hora da Verdade (Twisted)
  - Killing Eve (Killing Eve: Dupla Obsessão)
  - Manifest (Manifest: O Mistério do Vôo 828)
  - Não Há Segunda Chance (Une Chance de Trop / No Second Chance)
  - The Mandalorian: Uma História de Guerra nas Estrelas (The Mandalorian)
  - Coyote
  - Magnum P.I. (2018)
  - NCIS: Havaí - Investigações Criminais (NCIS: Hawaii)
  - Barrados No Baile - Nova Geração (90210)
  - The Equalizer: A Protetora (The Equalizer)
  - A Ilha da Fantasia (2021) (Fantasy Island)
  - La Brea: A Terra Perdida (La Brea) - exibição dos dois primeiros episódios da série em formato de telefilme
  - This Is Us: Histórias de Família (This Is Us)
  - Small Axe: Vermelho, Branco e Azul (Small Axe)
  - Mentes Extraordinárias (Brilliant Minds)
- 2010s
  - Hawaii 5-0 (2010)
  - Mentes Criminosas (Criminal Minds)
  - Crimes do Colarinho Branco (White Collar)
  - Revenge
  - Under The Dome: Prisão Invisível
  - Houdini
  - The Cleveland Show
  - Terra do Nunca (Neverland)
  - Raízes (2016) (Roots)
  - O Gerente da Noite (The Night Manager)
  - Guerra & Paz (2017)
  - The Flash (Flash)
  - Supergirl
  - Gotham
  - Ressurreição (Ressurrection)
  - Escândalos: Os Bastidores do Poder (Scandal)
  - Empire: Fama e Poder (Empire)
  - Segredos do Paraíso (Graceland)
  - Lendas do Amanhã (DCs Legends of Tomorrow)
  - Homeland: Segurança Nacional (Homeland)
  - Blindspot (Ponto Cego)
  - Segredos e Mentiras (Secrets and Lies)
  - Agentes Fora da Lei (Breakout Kings)
  - The Blacklist (Lista Negra)
  - Agent Carter (Agente Carter)
  - Castle
  - Damages
  - Legends: Identidade Perdida (Legends)
  - Rush: Medicina Vip (Rush)
  - Tirano: Poder Sem Limites (Tyrant)
  - Agents of S.H.I.E.L.D. (Agentes da S.H.I.E.L.D.)
  - Perception: Truques da Mente
  - Agenda Proibida (The Client List)
  - Stalker: Obsessão (Stalker)
  - Terra Nova
  - The Good Guys
  - Prova do Crime (Body of Proof)
  - Destino Final: Palm Glade (The Glades)
  - Esquadrão de Heróis (The Super Hero Squad Show)
  - Stan, O Cão Blogueiro
  - Gravity Falls: Um Verão de Mistérios
  - Kung Fu Panda: Lendas do Dragão Guerreiro
  - Ultimate Homem-Aranha (Ultimate Spider-Man)
  - Lições de um Crime (How To Get Away With Murder)
  - Máquina Mortífera (2016) (Lethal Weapon)
  - The Good Doctor: O Bom Doutor
  - Jogo de Espiões
  - Lista Negra (The Black List)
- 2000s
  - 24 Horas (24)
  - iCarly
  - Drake & Josh
  - Uma Família da Pesada
  - Lost
  - Hannah Montana
  - Jonas
  - American Dad!
  - Glee
  - Victorious
  - Crimes no Paraíso
  - Lie to Me
  - Prison Break
- 1990s
  - The Flash
  - Barrados no Baile (Beverly Hills 90210)
  - Melrose (Melrose Place)
  - Força de Emergência (True Blue)
  - O Lobisomem Ataca de Novo (Werewolf)
  - Herói por Acaso (My Secret Identity)
  - Raio de Ação (Lightning Force)
  - Um Homem Chamado Falcão (A Man Called Hawk)
  - Models
  - Tal Pai, Tal Filho (Doogie Howser MD)
  - O Jovem Indiana Jones (Chronicles Of Young Indiana Jones)
  - Justiça Final (Dark Justice)
  - Twin Peaks
  - Família Dinossauros (Dinosaurs)
  - Baywatch: S.O.S. Malibu
  - Nova York Contra o Crime (NYPD Blue)
  - Justiceiros (The Hat Squad)
  - Anjo Maldito (Gabriel´s Fire)
  - Seaquest (Seaquest DSV)
  - Brisco Jr. (The Adventures Of Brisco County Jr)
  - Tudo em Cima (Ready Or Not)
  - Sob O Sol De Miami (Moon Over Miami)
  - Point de Verão (Tropical Heat/Sweating Bullets)
  - Contra Ataque (Counterstrike)
  - Thunder, Missão No Mar (Thunder In Paradise)
  - Combate Mortal (Deadly Games)
  - Gêmeos Do Outro Mundo (They Came From Other Space)
  - Mulher Nota 1000 (Weird Science)
  - O Elo Perdido (Land of the Lost)
  - Justiça Final (Dark Justice)
  - O Jovem Indiana Jones (The Young Indiana Jones Chronicles)
  - Combate Mortal (Deadly Games)
  - Raven
  - Amazing Stories
  - Angel
  - Buffy, A Caça-Vampiros (Buffy, The Vampire Slayer)
  - Lois & Clark: As Novas Aventuras do Superman (Lois and Clark: The New Adventures Of Superman)
  - Plantão Médico (ER)
  - Tudo Ou Nada (Baywatch Nights)
  - Spin City
  - Power Rangers
  - VR Troopers
  - Caiu do Céu (Touched By A Angel)
  - Highlander
  - Robin Hood (1995)
  - Um Homem Sem Passado (Nowhere Man)
  - Cobra (1993)
  - Robocop
  - As Aventuras de Sinbad (The Adventures of Sinbad)
  - Fallen Angels: A Inocência Perdida
  - Tremors: O Retorno dos Vermes Malditos
  - Dawsons Creek
  - Parceiros da Lei (Players)
  - Os Simpsons
  - M.A.N.T.I.S.: O Vingador (MANTIS)
  - Nikita (La Femme Nikita)
  - As Aventuras de Sinbad (The Adventures of Simbad)
  - As Patricinhas de Beverly Hills (Clueless)
  - Sabrina, Aprendiz de Feiticeira (Sabrina, The Teenage Witch)
  - F/X: A Série (F/X: The Series)
  - Dupla Explosiva (L.A. Heat)
- 1980s
  - Daniel Boone
  - Jeannie é um Gênio (I Dream Of Jeannie)
  - A Feiticeira (Bewitched)
  - Kung Fu
  - O Homem Invisível
  - Viagem ao Fundo do Mar
  - Mulher-Maravilha (1975) (Wonder Woman)
  - Viagem Fantástica (Fantastic Voyage)
  - Os Waltons (The Waltons)
  - As Panteras (1976) (Charlie´s Angels)
  - O Barco do Amor (The Love Boat)
  - Happy Days (Happy Days/Happy Days Again)
  - Vegas
  - Galeria do Terror (Rod Serling´s Night Gallery)
  - O Incrível Hulk (The Incredible Hulk)
  - Àguia de Fogo (Airwolf)
  - Carro Comando (T.J Hooker)
  - Duro Na Queda (The Fall Guy)
  - Faro Fino (Crazy Like A Fox)
  - Deloucacia de Polícia (The Last Precinct)
  - Unidade Especial
  - MacGyver: Profissão Perigo
  - Dama de Ouro (Lady Blue)
  - Na Mira do Tira (Sledge Hammer!)
  - Passe de Mágica (The Wizard)
  - Casal 20 (Hart To Hart)
  - Tempo Quente (Riptide)
  - Curto Circuito (Misfits Of Science)
  - Fuga Maluca (Stir Crazy)
  - Deloucacia de Polícia (The Last Precinct)
  - Alf, O ET Teimoso (ALF)
  - O Pequeno Mestre (Sidekicks)
  - A Gata E O Rato (Moonlightning)
  - Magnum
  - Operação Resgate (Salvage 1)
  - Esquadrão Resgate (Chopper Squad)
  - Cara e Coroa (Hardcastle and McCormick)
  - Jogo de Damas (Partners In Crime/Fifty Fifty)
  - O Homem De Seis Milhões De Dólares (The Six Million Dollar Man)
  - Os Intocáveis (1963) (The Untouchables)
  - Pais Demais (My Two Dads)
  - Boca Livre (Easy Street)
  - Três É Demais (Full House)
  - O Homem Da Máfia (Wiseguy)
  - Tiro Certo (Hunter)
  - Dallas
  - Dinastia (Dynasty)
  - Moto Laser (Street Hawk)
  - Caras e Caretas (Family Ties)
  - O Poderoso Benson (Benson)
  - Super Gatas (Golden Girls)
  - Super Vicky (Small Wonder)
  - Primo Cruzado (Perfect Strangers)
  - O Carona
  - Anjos da Lei (21 Jump Street)
  - A Bela e a Fera (1987) (Beauty And The Beast)
  - Esquadrão Classe A (The A Team)
  - Suspense (com Alfred Hitchcock) (Alfred Hitchcock Presents)
  - Força de Emergência (True Blue)
  - Pega Ladrão (Palace Guard)
  - Enfermeiras (Nightingales)
  - Ghost, A Série (Shades Of L.A)
  - Um Homem Chamado Falcão (A Man Called Hawk)
  - Miami Vice

== Reality shows/Game shows ==
- Big Brother Brasil
- The Voice Brasil
- Salvou? É Seu! (The Million Pound Drop) - (Domingão com Huck)
- The Voice Kids
- Três Minutos para Brilhar
- The Voice +
- Quem Quer Ser um Milionário? (Who Wants to Be a Millionaire?) - (Domingão com Huck)
- Show dos Famosos (Your Face Sounds Familiar)
- Dança dos Famosos (Dancing with the Stars)
- The Masked Singer Brasil (Masked Singer)
- No Limite (Survivor)
- Tem Ou Não Tem (Family Feud) - (Caldeirão)
- Acredite Em Quem Quiser (To Tell the Truth) - (Domingão com Huck)
- Batalha de Família (Family Game Fight!) - (Pipoca da Ivete)
- Batalha do Lip Sync (Lip Sync Battle) - (Domingão com Huck)
- ? (Alter Ego) - (In project)
- Zig Zag Arena (Game Show)
- Mestre do Sabor
- Minha Mãe Cozinha Melhor Que a Sua (2023)
- Quem Vem pra Cantar? (Mystery Duets) - (Domingão com Huck)
- Pequenos Gênios (Genius Junior) - (Caldeirão do Huck) - (2020)
- Tá Brincando (Pros vs. Joes) - (2019)
- Ding Dong (Superstar Ding Dong) - (Domingão do Faustão)
- Se vira nos 30 (30 Seconds to Fame) - (Domingão do Faustão)
- Popstar
- Os Melhores Anos das Nossas Vidas (2018)
- The Wall - (Caldeirão do Huck) - (2018)
- SuperStar (Rising Star) (2014-2016)
- Saltibum (Celebrity Splash!) - (Caldeirão do Huck)
- Chefe Secreto (Undercover Boss) - (Fantástico)
- Dança no Gelo (Skating with Celebrities / Dancing on Ice) - (Domingão do Faustão)
- Agora ou Nunca - (Caldeirão do Huck)
- Garotada & Cachorrada (reality show about children training dogs) (2016) - (Domingão do Faustão)
- Os Iluminados (Keep Your Light Shining) (2015-2016) - (Domingão do Faustão)
- Truque Vip (reality show about magical tricks and illusionism with celebrities) (2015-2016) - (Domingão do Faustão)
- The Ultimate Fighter: Brazil (The Ultimate Fighter) (2012-2015)
- Tem gente atrás (Avanti un altro!) (2013-2014) - (Domingão do Faustão)
- Ruim de Roda (Worst Driver) (2012) - (Caldeirão do Huck)
- Jogo de Panelas (Come Dine with Me) (2012) - (Mais Você)
- Os Encolhidos (XXS – Extra Extra Small) (2010-2011) - (Domingão do Faustão)
- Sufoco (The Whole 19 Yards) (2010) - (Domingão do Faustão)
- Hipertensão (Fear Factor) (2002-2011)
- Maratoma (Wipeout) (2009) - (Domingão do Faustão)
- No Limite (Survivor) (2000-2009)
- Jogo Duro (Estate of Panic) (2009)
- Super Chefinhos (2009-2016) - (Mais Você)
- Super Chef (2008-2011) - (Mais Você)
- De Cara no Muro (Brain Wall) (2008-2010) - (Domingão do Faustão)
- Jogo dos 10 (Power of 10) (2008) - (Domingão do Faustão)
- Dancinha dos Famosos (Dancing with the Stars Kids) (2007-2017) - (Domingão do Faustão)
- Circo do Faustão (Celebrity Circus) (2007) - (Domingão do Faustão)
- Soletrando (2007-2015) - (Caldeirão do Huck)
- Pulsação (2005-2015) - (Caldeirão do Huck)
- TV Xuxa (2008-2014)
- Quebrando a Rotina (2004) - (Caldeirão do Huck)
- O Jogo (Murder in Small Town X) (2003)
- FAMA (Star Academy) (2002-2005)
- Acorrentados (Chains of Love) (2002-2004) - (Caldeirão do Huck)
- Amor a Bordo (2002) - (Caldeirão do Huck)
- Guerra dos Sonos (Exhausted) (2002) - (Caldeirão do Huck)
- Video Game (2001-2011)
- Ponto a Ponto (El gran juego de la oca) (1996)
- Jogo da Velha (Celebrity Squares) (1989-1993-2015) - (Domingão do Faustão)
- Ponto Fraco (The Weakest Link) (2001) (Cancelled)
- Jogo da Velha (Match Game) (1989-1993)
- Clube dos Quinze (Jackpot) (1975)

== Movie blocks ==
- Cine Fã-Clube (2014–2015)
- Sessão Brasil (2007-2014)
- Sessão Aventura (1977-2001, 2021)
- Sessão Comédia (1976-1990 - when Teletema returned; 1991-1996)
- Sessão de Sábado (1992-2011)
- Sessão de Domingo (1970-1989)
- Cinema do Líder (2022-2023)
- Sessão de Gala (1976-2019)
- Festival de Sucessos (1977–1996; 2008–2014; 2019, for 4 weeks in an exceptional basis)
- Festival Nacional (1981-1990; 1998-2014)
- Festival Primavera (1990-1998)
- Festival de Inverno (1978-1998)
- Festival de Verão (1978-1996)
- Festival de Férias (1977-2000)
- Festival Rexona de Cinema (2019)
- Sessão Brasil (2007-2014)
- Cine Clube (1984-1996)
- Primeira Exibição (1974-1995)
- Cinema Em Casa (1970-1980)
- Semana da Primavera (1986-1989)
- Sessão Das Dez (1965-1970)
- Sessão Da Meia Noite (1965-1970)
- Festival De Clássicos (1965-1970)
- Festival De Bang Bang (1965-1970)
- Sessão Western (1970-1990)
- Sessão Cowboy (1970-1990)
- Sessão Coruja (1965-1975)
- Coruja Colorida (1975-1985)
- Intercine (1996-2010)
- Intercine Brasil (2004-2007)

== See also ==
- List of programs broadcast by TV Globo
