= List of programs broadcast by TV Globo =

TV Globo (formerly Rede Globo; Globo Network), or simply Globo, is a Brazilian television network, launched by media mogul Roberto Marinho on April 26, 1965. It is owned by media conglomerate Grupo Globo, being by far the largest of its holdings. Globo is the second-largest commercial TV network in annual revenue worldwide behind just American Broadcasting Company and the largest producer of telenovelas.

Globo launches its own schedule of shows and programs annually, and launches new seasons of pilots, something only seen in Globo itself, compared with the other major television channels in Brazil (Record, Band, RedeTV!, and SBT). They convey the American TV shows (Record, Band, and SBT) and/or religious programs (Band and RedeTV!).

Globo has output deals with Walt Disney Pictures, 20th Century Studios, Marvel Studios, DreamWorks Animation, Paramount Pictures, Sony Pictures Entertainment, and more, having one of the largest film libraries for being shown on a TV network. As of 2013, they started to broadcast films from Warner Bros. Entertainment.

== Current programs ==
=== Telenovelas ===
English Title	Title	As	Run
Lá na Minha Terra		Novela I (6pm)	November 9, 2026–present
Por Você		Novela II (7pm)	August 17, 2026–present
Quem Ama Cuida		Novela III (9pm)	May 18, 2026–present
Roque Santeiro		Edição Especial	October 5, 2026–present
Avenida Brasil		Vale a Pena Ver de Novo	March 30, 2026–present

=== Reality shows ===
English Title	Title	Run	Notes
Big Brother Brazil	Big Brother Brasil	2002–present	
Chef de Alto Nível		2025–present	

=== Late night ===
English Title	Title	Run	Notes
Talk with Bial	Conversa com Bial	2017–present	
Lady Night		2019–present	
What Are You Talking About, Porchat?	Que História é Essa, Porchat?	2020–present	
Avisa Lá Que Eu Vou		2022–present	

=== Variety ===
Title	Host	Run	Notes
Variety Shows
Domingão com Huck	Luciano Huck	2021–present	
Caldeirão com Mion	Marcos Mion	2021–present	
Em Família com Eliana	Eliana	2026–present	
Morning Shows
Mais Você	Ana Maria Braga	1999–present	
Encontro com Patrícia Poeta (Meeting with Patrícia Poeta)	Patrícia Poeta	2012–present	
É de Casa	Maria Beltrão, Thiago Oliveira, Rita Batista and Talita Morete	2015–present	
Talk Shows
Altas Horas	Serginho Groisman	2000–present	
Viver Sertanejo	Daniel	2024–present	

=== Music festivals ===
Title	Host	Run
Show da Virada	Various	1998–present
Rock in Rio	Various	1985–present
Lolapalooza Brazil	Various	2012–present
The Town Festival	Various	2023–present
Circuito Sertanejo	Various	2022–present

=== Stand-up comedy ===
Title	Host	Run	Notes
Aberto ao Público	Maurício Meirelles, Bruna Louise, Murilo Couto and Thiago Ventura	2025–present	

=== Educational and Social service ===
Title	Host	Day of the week	Run	Notes
Criança Esperança	Various	Yearly	1986–present	

=== Newscasts ===
==== National network ====
Title	Host(s)	Run	Notes
Jornal Nacional	César Tralli and Renata Vasconcellos	1969–present	
Jornal da Globo	Renata Lo Prete	1982–present	
Jornal Hoje	Roberto Kovalick	1971–present	
Bom Dia Brasil	Ana Paula Araújo	1983–present	
Hora Um da Notícia	Tiago Scheuer	2014–present	

==== Local ====
Title	Host(s)	Run	Notes
Bom Dia Praça	It varies for each local broadcaster.	1983–present	
Praça TV 1ª Edição	It varies for each local broadcaster.	1983–present	
Praça TV 2ª Edição	It varies for each local broadcaster.	1983–present	
Boletim Praça TV 2ª Edição	It varies for each local broadcaster.	2025–present	—

==== National network and local ====
Title	Host(s)	Run	Notes
Bom Dia Sábado	It varies for each local broadcaster. (local) Sabina Simonato and Marcelo Pereira (national network)	2018–present (local) 2025–present (national network)	

=== Breaking news ===
Title	Host(s)	Run
Plantão da Globo	Depends	1976–present

=== Journalistic programs ===
==== National network ====
Title	Host(s)	Run	Rating	Notes
Retrospectiva	Sandra Annenberg	1971–present	23.9 (2014 edition)	—
Globo Repórter	Sandra Annenberg and William Bonner	1973–present	25	
Fantástico	Poliana Abritta and Maria Júlia Coutinho	1973–present	19	
Globo Rural	Hellen Martins, Nélson Araújo and Cristina Vieira	1980–present	8	
Pequenas Empresas & Grandes Negócios	Pedro Lins	1988–present	—	
Profissão Repórter	Caco Barcellos	2006–present	—	

==== Local ====
Title	Host(s)	Run	Notes
Globo Comunidade	It varies for each local broadcaster.	1991–present	

=== Sports ===
==== National network ====
Title	Host(s)	Run	Notes
Auto Esporte	Cris Amaral	2002–present	
Segue o Jogo	Lucas Gutierrez; Paulo Nunes	2019–present	
Bora Pro Jogo	Tiago Medeiros	2025–present	

==== National network and local ====
Title	Host(s)	Run	Notes
Globo Esporte	Alex Escobar (national network) It varies for each local broadcaster. (local)	1978–present	
Esporte Espetacular	Karine Alves and Fernando Fernandes (national network) It varies for each local broadcaster. (local)	1973–1983; 1987–present	

==== Sports coverage ====
- Fórmula 1 na Globo (1972–1979; 1981–2020; 2026–present)
- Futebol na Globo (1965–presente)
  - Campeonato Brasileiro
  - Copa do Brasil
  - CONMEBOL Libertadores
  - FIFA World Cup
  - UEFA Euro
  - CONMEBOL Copa América
  - FIFA Women's World Cup
  - Brasileirão Feminino
  - Paulistão F
- Jogo Olimpíadas na Globo
  - Summer Olympic Games
  - Winter Olympic Games
- Jogos Paralímpicos na Globo
  - Summer Paralympic Games
  - Winter Paralympic Games

=== Carnival ===
Title	Presenters	Run
Globeleza (1990–present)
Rio Carnival	Alex Escobar	1970–present
Rio Carnival	Karine Alves	1970–present
Rio Carnival	Mariana Gross	1970–present
São Paulo Carnival	Everaldo Marques	1991–present
São Paulo Carnival	Valéria Almeida	1991–present

=== Religious ===
Title	Host(s)	Run
Santa Missa	Priest Marcelo Rossi	1968—present

=== Movie blocks ===
Title	Run	Notes
Sessão da Tarde	1974–present	
Domingo Maior	1972–present	
Cinema Especial	1978–present	
Supercine	1981–present	
Corujão	1986–present	
Tela Quente	1988–present	
Temperatura Máxima	1989–present	
Cinemaço	2019–present	
Campeões de Bilheteria	1969–1998; 2020–present	
Sessão de Sábado	1992–2011; 2019; 2020; 2021–present	

=== Series blocks ===
Title	Run	Notes
Sessão Globoplay	2019–present	

=== Series ===
Title	Run	Notes
Tô Nessa	2024—present	
Pablo & Luisão	2026—present	

=== International series ===
English title	Title	Run	Notes
This Is Us		2022–present	—
The Irrational	Irracional - A Ciência do Crime	2025–present	

=== Sitcoms blocks ===
Title	As	Run	Notes
Vai que Cola	Sessão Comédia na Madruga	2022—present	

== See also ==
- List of former programs broadcast on TV Globo
