= Hipertensão season 2 =

Hipertensão
- Season 2
- Starring: Glenda Kozlowski
- No. of episodes: 14

Release
- Original network: Rede Globo
- Original release: September 2 – October 21, 2010

Season chronology
- ← Previous; Season 1

Hipertensão 2 (also known as Hipertensão 2010) is the second season the Brazilian stunt / dare reality television show Hipertensão, which premiered September 2, 2010, with the season finale airing on October 21, 2010 on the Rede Globo television network.

The show is produced by Endemol Globo and presented by journalist Glenda Kozlowski, who took over hosting duties from Zeca Camargo.

The winner will receive the grand prize of R$500,000, while runner-up and third-place finishers will walk away with R$100,000 and R$50,000 respectively.

== Format ==
The season 2 format is similar to Fear Factor Extreme (FFX) instead of the original "three-stunt, one winner per episode" format used in the first season. Season 2 consists of multiple sets of stunts and a set number of contestants over a period of weeks.

== Production ==
=== Cast ===
There were no application process for the series second season. The sixteen contestants were selected from applications received for No Limite Xtream, who was scheduled to air in 2010, but was postponed due to logistical problems.

=== Filming ===
Filming took place in Benavidez, 35 km from Buenos Aires, Argentina. Shooting started on Wednesday, August 25, 2010 and run for thirty days, until Friday, September 24, 2010.

== Contestants ==
The cast list was unveiled on Monday, August 23, 2010.

(ages stated at time of contest)

Name	Age	Occupation	Hometown	Eliminated
Fábio Toshi	29	Financial Analyst	São Paulo	Winner
Marcos Viana	25	Marketing Manager	São Paulo	Episode 14 (2nd)
Danilo Franca	26	Student	São Paulo	Episode 14 (3rd)
Lucas Iozzi	26	Cowboy	Ribeirão Preto	Episode 14 (4th)
Nanda Tavares	25	Student	Fortaleza	Episode 13
Leonardo Espírito Santo	27	Businessman	Belo Horizonte	Episode 12
Lorie Anjos	21	Photographer	Salvador	Episode 11
Andressa Ribeiro	20	Student and Model	Porto Alegre	Episode 10
Janine Cardoso	36	Journalist	São Paulo	Episode 9
Manu de Almeida	30	Personal Trainer	Rio de Janeiro	Episode 8
Fernanda Agnes	30	Manager	Santa Cruz do Sul	Episode 7
Thaís Romani	33	Personal Trainer	Porto Alegre	Episode 5
Billy Fallaw	27	Student	João Pessoa	Episode 4
Toncley Russo	37	Jump Instructor	São Paulo	Episode 4
Ashanti Beal	25	Promoter	Florianópolis	Episode 3
Vander Cabral	28	Bodyguard	São Paulo	Episode 2
Marcão Marcollino	27	Street-Sweeper	Rio de Janeiro	Episode 1

== Elimination Chart ==
Place	Contestant	Episodes													
Place	Contestant	1	2	3	4	5	6	7	8	9	10	11	12	13	14
1	Toshi				WIN	WIN	LOW	IN	LOW	IN	IN	IN	IN	WIN	WIN
2	Marcos	IN	IN	IN	IN	IN	IN	WIN	IN	IN	WIN	IN	LOW	IN	OUT
3	Danilo	IN	IN	IN	IN	IN	OUT								OUT
4	Lucas	IN	IN	IN	IN	LOW	IN	LOW	IN	IN	LOW	WIN	WIN	LOW	OUT
5	Nanda	IN	IN	IN	IN	IN	LOW	LOW	WIN	LOW	LOW	LOW	LOW	OUT	
6	Leo	LOW	LOW	WIN	LOW	IN	IN	IN	IN	IN	IN	LOW	OUT		
7	Lorie	IN	IN	IN	IN	IN	IN	IN	IN	WIN	IN	OUT			
8	Andressa	IN	IN	IN	WIN	WIN	WIN	IN	LOW	LOW	OUT				
9	Janine	WIN	IN	LOW	IN	IN	IN	WIN	IN	OUT					
10	Manu	IN	IN	IN	LOW	LOW	IN	LOW	OUT						
11	Fernanda	LOW	IN	IN	IN	IN	IN	OUT							
12	Thaís	IN	IN	WIN	LOW	OUT									
13	Billy	IN	WIN	IN	WD										
14	Toncley	WIN	IN	LOW	WD										
15	Ashanti	IN	LOW	OUT											
16	Vander	IN	OUT												
17	Marcão	OUT													

=== Key ===
==== Stunt Wins/Losses ====
The contestant won the 1st stunt and was immune for the voting.
The contestant had one of the better performances in the 1st stunt and was therefore exempted from competing in the 2nd stunt.
The contestant had one of the better performances in the 2nd stunt and was therefore exempted from competing in the 3rd stunt.

==== Bottom/Elimination ====
The contestant was voted into the bottom three by losing the 2nd stunt.
The contestant was voted into the bottom three by losing the 2nd stunt and was eliminated after losing the 3rd stunt.
The contestant was voted into the bottom three by the contestant's vote.
The contestant was voted into the bottom three by the contestant's vote and was eliminated after losing the 3rd stunt.

==== The Final Positions ====
The contestant came in last in the 1st stunt and finished in 4th place.
The contestant came in last in the 2nd stunt and finished in 3rd place.
The contestant came in last in the 3rd stunt and finished in 2nd place.
The contestant came in first in the 3rd stunt and won the competition.

== Voting History ==
	Episodes														Finale		Nominations received
	1	2	3	4	5	6	7	8	9	10	11	12	13	14	Finale		Nominations received
Toshi	Not in Show			Manu	Janine	Janine	Manu	Marcos	Marcos	Leo	Marcos	Marcos	Finalist	Finalist	Winner (Day 30)		14
Marcos	Marcão	Andressa	Janine	Manu	Nanda	Toshi	Manu	Toshi	Nanda	Andressa	Lorie	Nanda	Finalist	Finalist	Runner-Up (Day 30)		14
Danilo	Lucas	Leo	Janine	Marcos	Lucas	Janine	Eliminated (Day 12)							Voted Back	3rd Place (Day 29)		2
Lucas	Marcão	Andressa	Andressa	Manu	Nanda	Toshi	Manu	Toshi	Nanda	Andressa	Lorie	Nanda	Bottom 2	Finalist	4th Place (Day 28)		14
Nanda	Marcão	Leo	Janine	Lorie	Lucas	Marcos	Lorie	Marcos	Marcos	Lorie	Marcos	Marcos	Bottom 2	Eliminated (Day 26)			14
Leo	Nanda	Andressa	Andressa	Manu	Exempt	Toshi	Manu	Toshi	Nanda	Andressa	Lorie	Nanda	Eliminated (Day 24)				10
Lorie	Lucas	Leo	Janine	Manu	Nanda	Toshi	Andressa	Toshi	Nanda	Andressa	Marcos	Eliminated (Day 22)					9
Andressa	Marcão	Leo	Billy	Manu	Lucas	Lucas	Leo	Marcos	Lucas	Lorie	Eliminated (Day 20)						12
Janine	Marcão	Fernanda	Manu	Lorie	Lucas	Toshi	Toshi	Toshi	Nanda	Eliminated (Day 18)							13
Manu	Lucas	Leo	Janine	Lorie	Lucas	Toshi	Toshi	Marcos	Eliminated (Day 16)								14
Fernanda	Lucas	Leo	Janine	Manu	Nanda	Toshi	Manu	Eliminated (Day 14)									1
Thaís	Lucas	Leo	Danilo	Manu	Lucas	Eliminated (Day 10)											0
Billy	Danilo	Andressa	Janine	Nanda	Withdrew (Day 8)												1
Toncley	Marcão	Andressa	Janine	Walked (Day 6)													0
Ashanti	Marcos	Leo	Janine	Eliminated (Day 6)													0
Vander	Marcão	Janine	Eliminated (Day 4)														0
Marcão	Lucas	Eliminated (Day 2)															7
Notes	(none)		1	2, 3	4	5, 6	7	(none)	8	(none)	9	10	11	(none)	(none)		
Walked	(none)		Toncley; 14th Place	Billy; 13th Place	(none)									(none)	(none)		
Nominated	Marcão; 7/16 votes	Leo; 8/15 votes	Janine; 9/14 votes	Manu; 8/13 votes	Lucas; 6/11 votes	Toshi; 7/11 votes	Manu; 5/10 votes	Toshi; 5/9 votes	Nanda; 5/8 votes	Andressa; 4/7 votes	Lorie; 3/6 votes	Nanda; 3/5 votes	(none)	(none)	(none)		
Nominated	Marcão; 7/16 votes	Leo; 8/15 votes	Janine; 9/14 votes	Manu; 8/13 votes	Lucas; 6/11 votes	Toshi; 7/11 votes	Manu; 5/10 votes	Toshi; 5/9 votes	Nanda; 5/8 votes	Andressa; 4/7 votes	Lorie; 3/6 votes	Marcos; 2/5 votes	(none)	(none)	(none)		
The Bottom	Fernanda; Leo; Marcão	Ashanti; Leo; Vander	Ashanti; Janine; Toncley	Leo; Manu; Thaís	Lucas; Manu; Thaís	Danilo; Nanda; Toshi	Fernanda; Lucas; Manu; Nanda	Andressa; Manu; Toshi	Andressa; Janine; Nanda	Andressa; Lucas; Nanda	Leo; Lorie; Nanda	Leo; Marcos; Nanda	Lucas; Nanda	(none)	(none)		
Eliminated	Marcão; 17th Place	Vander; 16th Place	Ashanti; 15th Place	Elimination; Cancelled	Thaís; 12th Place	Danilo; Returned	Fernanda; 11th Place	Manu; 10th Place	Janine; 9th Place	Andressa; 8th Place	Lorie; 7th Place	Leo; 6th Place	Nanda; 5th Place	Danilo to return	Lucas; 4th Place	Danilo; 3rd Place	
Eliminated	Marcão; 17th Place	Vander; 16th Place	Ashanti; 15th Place	Elimination; Cancelled	Thaís; 12th Place	Danilo; Returned	Fernanda; 11th Place	Manu; 10th Place	Janine; 9th Place	Andressa; 8th Place	Lorie; 7th Place	Leo; 6th Place	Nanda; 5th Place	Danilo to return	Marcos; Runner-Up	Toshi; Winner	

=== Notes ===
- Note 1: Shortly after survive the third elimination, Toncley voluntarily left the game before new competitions occurring. At the same night, a new male contestant, Toshi, entered the game as his replacement.
- Note 2: Contestants had one minute to decide together whom to give a free ticket to the next episode. They chose Janine, therefore saving her from elimination in episode 3.
- Note 3: Billy was evacuated for medical reasons. Still, the bottom three contestants had to compete in the third stunt. Since all three contestants passed the stunt, this round's elimination was cancelled.
- Note 4: Shortly after passed the second stunt, Leo was temporarily evacuated for medical reasons, therefore, he was exempt for the voting.
- Note 5: Contestants had one minute to decide together who to give a free ticket to the next episode. They chose Leo, therefore saving him from elimination in episode 6.
- Note 6: Andressa & Toshi won the first stunt as a team. However, only one of them would win the immunity. Toshi gave up his immunity and gave to Andressa, saving her from elimination in episode 6.
- Note 7: Episode 7 featured a bottom four, instead a bottom three facing the elimination stunt.
- Note 8: Leo & Lorie won the first stunt as a team. However, only one of them would win the immunity. Leo gave up his immunity and gave to Lorie, saving her from elimination in episode 9.
- Note 9: At the House Council, Lorie and Marcos tied with 3 votes each. Lucas, as immunity winner, had the casting vote and chose to nominate Lorie.

=== Key ===
The contestant was immune for the voting.
The contestant was already in the bottom.
