= Murder in Small Town X =

American television series

- Genre: Reality/Murder mystery
- Created by: George Verschoor; Robert Fisher Jr.; Gordon Cassidy
- Presented by: Gary Fredo
- Country of origin: United States
- Original language: English
- No. of seasons: 1
- No. of episodes: 8

Production
- Executive producer: Conrad Green
- Production location: Eastport, Maine
- Running time: 60 minutes
- Production companies: Hoosick Falls Productions; Fox Television Studios

Original release
- Network: Fox
- Release: July 24 – September 4, 2001

Related
- The Murder Game

Murder in Small Town X (sometimes abbreviated MiSTX) is an American reality television series created by George Verschoor, Robert Fisher Jr., and Gordon Cassidy and was hosted by Sgt. Gary Fredo, a California Police Investigator, that aired on Fox from July through September 2001. The series immerses contestants in a fictional town, and challenges them to solve a murder. Each week, one of the contestants is "murdered" (and removed from the show); the final contestant solves the case and wins $250,000.

Although classified as a reality television series, given the format's unique nature, it was more accurately described as a hybrid of a reality TV show, game show, and mystery drama. It is notable for the fact that its winner, New York City fireman Ángel Juarbe Jr., was a first responder who died in the line of duty during the September 11 attacks, exactly one week after the show's finale aired.

== Premise ==
The premise of the show was to bring 10 contestants from around the United States of America to the small fishing village of Eastport, Maine (called "Sunrise" in the show) to act as amateur investigators to solve a series of fictional murders.

Initially, the investigators were given a list of 15 suspects who were "townspeople" played by actors and actresses. A large number of improvisational actors and actresses were stationed around the real-life town, and their job was to provide clues (useful and not useful) to the investigators. Each week, the investigators were sent out on varying missions around the town in order to discover clues to clear suspects. Additionally, the murderer would strike again, clearing suspects as well.

In every episode a Lead Investigator, or Lifeguard, is chosen. In the first episode, the Lifeguard was chosen by random draw. For the following episodes, the Lifeguard is chosen by the investigator who was eliminated the previous episode via pre-recorded message. For the final two investigators, the previous investigator who was eliminated will determine who gets his or her first choice on which suspect they want to pursue.

Every three days, two envelopes, red and black, would be discovered somewhere in the town. In the red envelope, there would be a question about what the investigators had learned during the day. The question would usually be pointed to one of the track teams, meaning whoever was involved with that line of investigation has the highest potential of answering it correctly. The team's answer would be sent to the killer via e-mail, with the address being anonymous. If correct, the killer would clear one of the remaining suspects. If wrong, the number of suspects would remain the same.

Afterward, the black envelope would be opened. It contains two smaller black envelopes, each containing a map of a certain location. The investigators (except the Lifeguard) would go into a separate room to vote for the first person who will play the Killer's game. After the vote, the Lifeguard picks the second person who will play. The two investigators would each choose a map and head out to the two different remote locations completely alone, with their movements recorded only by night-vision cameras. One of the investigators would discover an important clue to the mystery, whereas the other would be eliminated off the show by being "murdered by the killer", with their last seconds seen through the eyes of said "killer" in the manner of classical slasher films.

Taco Bell promoted the show.

== Story ==
The game started out with the mysterious murder of a family known as the Flints, on which the investigators would base their investigation. It soon turned out there was much more to this case when suspects started to turn up dead. The solution to the mystery involved the discovery that the members of a local family, the Duchamps, had been murdered together in 1941 just after the Pearl Harbor Attack because they had stumbled onto a town's secret involving illegal liquor smuggling from Canada. The murder had been committed with the assent of many of the town's leaders, who met in a secret lodge, a society called "The Order of the Scarlet Lupine" or the "O.S.L." The family had been bound in a room together, and the room was set on fire.

The "murders" were being committed by a descendant of one of the family members who escaped the fire and who was gaining his revenge against the descendants of the town leaders who had condoned the burning of the family in 1941. This survivor, known as the "Burnt Face Man", left several recordings of himself to his child, which were clues for the investigators. As it turned out, he murdered one of the men responsible for the killing of his family, but he was overwhelmed with guilt and committed suicide. The burnt man's child decided to take up his father's work, attacking those responsible or descendants of those responsible for his family's death. Using a bang stick, a close-range rifle-like weapon used to kill fish, not only was he not overwhelmed with guilt like his father, he found it exciting, and decided to make a game of it, resulting in the creation of the killers game.

The killer was revealed to be William Lambert (whose real last name is Duchamps), a business partner of Nate Flint and a common target of suspicion (although all initial theories about him turned out to be irrelevant). He killed the people that were either related to or are the members of the O.S.L. They were Blodgett (killed by his father), DeBeck, Flint, Merchant, Rose, Thibodeaux, and the eliminated investigators, using their corpses to recreate the unfinished family dinner they had before being interrupted by the fire. Samantha "Sam" Larabee was supposed to be William's last victim (completing the set), but in the finale, Ángel, the winner, rescued her before William was able to complete his final murder. The fictional police chief, Dudley Duncan, chased him up a flight of stairs and shot him in his bedroom, sending him crashing out the window and falling two stories to the hard concrete below.

== Contestants ==
Contestant	Occupation	Hometown	Eliminated	Final Killer's Game Location
Shirley King	Home Health Agency Owner	Henderson, Nevada	Episode 1	Chicken Ranch
Andrew "Andy" Landan	Media Planner	Chicago, Illinois	Episode 2	Old Mustard Mill
Lindsey Labrum	Student	Las Vegas, Nevada	Episode 3	The Verdant Hothouses
Stacey Carmona	Bartender	Staten Island, New York	Episode 4	The Marine Supply Warehouse
Brian Porvin	Medical Student	Fort Lauderdale, Florida	Episode 5	Kingfisher Aquaculture
Kristen Kirchner	Mortgage Banker	Los Angeles, California	Episode 6	Sunrise Junkyard
Katie Kloecker	Office Temporary Work	Erie, Pennsylvania	Episode 7	Sunrise High School
Jeff Monroe	Model	Portland, Oregon	Finale	DeBeck's Compound
Alan Frye	Delicatessen Owner	Knoxville, Tennessee	Runner-Up	Kovick's Boathouse
Ángel Juarbe Jr.	Firefighter	The Bronx, New York	Winner	Lambert's House

== Voting history ==
Episode	1	2	3	4	5	6	7	Finale	
Eliminated	Shirley	Andy	Lindsey	Stacey	Brian	Kristen	Katie	Jeff^{2}	N/A
Group's Pick	Shirley	Andy	Kristen	Kristen	Brian	Jeff, Kristen^{1}	Katie	Alan, Jeff^{2}	N/A
Lifeguard's Pick	Kristen	Brian	Lindsey	Stacey	Kristen	Jeff, Kristen^{1}	Jeff	Alan, Jeff^{2}	N/A

Group Voting
Ángel	Shirley	Andy	Kristen	Kristen	Brian	Jeff	L.G.	L.G.	WINNER
Alan	Shirley	Andy	L.G.	Kristen	Brian	Kristen	Katie	Jeff^{2}	RUNNER-UP
Jeff	Shirley	Andy	Kristen	Kristen	L.G.	Kristen	Katie	Alan^{2}	Murdered
Katie	Shirley	Andy	Kristen	Kristen	Kristen	L.G.	Jeff	Murdered	
Kristen	Jeff	L.G.	Stacey	Jeff	Brian	Jeff	Murdered		
Brian	Shirley	Andy	Kristen	L.G.	Kristen	Murdered			
Stacey	Shirley	Andy	Kristen	Kristen	Murdered				
Lindsey	Jeff	Andy	Stacey	Murdered					
Andy	L.G.	Lindsey	Murdered						
Shirley	Jeff	Murdered							

The investigator winner.
The investigator was chosen as the lifeguard, and could not vote or be voted against.
The investigator was chosen to play the killer's game, and found the killer clue at their location, surviving and returning to the group.
The investigator was chosen to play the killer's game, and was ambushed and murdered by the killer at their location, eliminating them.

Italic names represent non-revealed votes, but were based on alliances.

^1In episode 6, a tie vote occurred between Jeff and Kristen. When asked to break the tie as a lifeguard, Katie opted to send both out to play the Killer's Game.

^2In the finale, Alan and Jeff didn't vote against each other. Because Ángel was immune (as he was chosen by Katie to be the lifeguard), there was no reason to vote and Alan and Jeff were immediately handed their maps.

== The game ==
=== The Killer's Questions ===
During each episode, the investigators would find a pair of red and black envelopes. While the black envelopes were for the Killer's Game, the red envelopes contained a questions for the investigators. The question usually pertained to one specific part of the day's investigation, and was only able to be answered correctly by the investigators that took part in the investigation at that point. For example, in Episode 2 the question was "what was the date of Oscar Blodgett's birth?" Andy and Angel were guarding his grave plot after it was vandalized and would be the ones who could answer it. When the group decided on an answer, they would email the answer to the killer's anonymous email address. The killer would then send them confirmation of a correct or incorrect answer. A correct answer eliminated a suspect, while an incorrect answer did nothing (this however is unknown since all questions were answered correctly).

Episode	Question	Team's Answer	Correct/Wrong	Cleared Suspect
1	"Because there were no bodies found, what did I wrap the bodies into to remove them from the house?"	Bed Linens	Correct	Dudley Duncan
2	"What was the date of Oscar Blodgett's birth?"	1924	Correct	X-Ray
3	"What is the daily tidal variation in Sunrise?"	23 feet	Correct	Leita Rose-Blodgett
4	"What is Pavor Nocturnus?"	A sleeping disorder involving night terrors	Correct	Drew Chambers
5	"How many sweepers were at the pier when Connor and Lambert killed the shark?"	12	Correct	Deanna Harris
6	"What rank was Connor's father?"	Master Sergeant	Correct	Samantha "Sam" Larabee
7	"What Bible chapter says: 'When justice is done, it brings joy to the righteous.' ?"	Proverbs 21:15	Correct	Emerson Bowden
Finale	"What year did my father die?"	1971	Correct	Rusty Crandall

=== The Suspects ===
These are fifteen suspects, in the order they were cleared of being the killer.

Suspect	Played By	Occupation	Suspect Status	Life Status
Dudley Duncan	Terence Paul Winter	Police Chief	Cleared Episode 1 Killer's Question	Alive
X-Ray	Shishir Kurup	Taxi Cab Driver	Cleared Episode 2 Killer's Question	Alive
Leita Rose-Blodgett	Joy Claussen	Mail Center Operator, the Flint's neighbor, Oscar Blodgett's widowed wife	Cleared Episode 3 Killer's Question	Murdered Episode 4
Drew Chambers	Ronnie Warner	Club Operator	Cleared Episode 4 Killer's Question	Alive
Deanna Harris	Jennifer Tung	Secretary of The Sunrise Press, Attorney	Cleared Episode 5 Killer's Question	Alive
G.D. Thibodeaux	Pat Battistini	Ferry Boat Captain, Fisherman, Vietnam War Veteran	Cleared Episode 5 After Killer's Game^{3}	Murdered Episode 6
Samantha "Sam" Larabee	Heather Campbell	Diner Owner, Frank Kovick's fiancée	Cleared Episode 6 Killer's Question	Alive; Kidnapped and Rescued^{4}
Hayden DeBeck	Don Chastain	General, Mind/Science Leader	Cleared Episode 7 Murdering	Murdered Episode 6 Noted Episode 7
Mary-Elizabeth Merchant	Jennifer Dibert	Abby Flint's best friend	Cleared Episode 7 Murdering	Murdered Episode 7
Emerson Bowden	Tim Walkoe	Town Mayor	Cleared Episode 7 Killer's Question	Alive
Rusty Crandall	Kent George	Church Reverend and Pastor of The First Church of Sunrise	Cleared in Finale; Killer's Question	Alive
Prudence Connor	Caitlin Keats	Garage Owner, Nate Flint's Mistress	Cleared in Finale; The Burnt Man's last film^{5}	Alive
Jimmy Tinker	Cory Pendergast	Hardware Store Employee, Abby Flint's boyfriend	Cleared in Finale; The Burnt Man's last film^{6}	Alive
Frank Kovick	Christopher Liam Moore	Local Newspaper Reporter, Samantha Larabee's fiancé	Cleared in Finale; The Final Confrontation	Alive
William Lambert (William Duchamps)	Tom Stechschulte	Nate Flint's business partner, owner of 2 Dollar Bill, later owner of The Sunrise Press	The Killer	Killed in Finale by Dudley Duncan

^3Kristen found G.D. at the end of the Killer's Game. Because Brian was killed by the killer, G.D. could not be the killer. In addition, G.D. was killed that night, but not found out until the next day.

^4Samantha was going to be William's final victim, but Angel rescued her before he could kill her.

^5Prudence was cleared because the Burnt Man says, "Goodbye my son...". This indicated that the killer had to be male.

^6Jimmy was cleared because he was too young to be the Burnt Man's son. He was 21, as the Burnt Man's final film is from 30 years ago.

== Episodes ==
=== Season 1 ===
No.	Title
1	"Episode 1"
Lifeguard: Andy; Suspect Cleared: Dudley Duncan; Sent to play the Killer's Game: Group's Pick: Shirley (6-3) - Chicken Farm; Lifeguard's Pick: Kristen - Dog Island; Eliminated: Shirley; Notes: Abby, Carmen, and Nate Flint are murdered by the killer in the beginning of the episode. The discovery of their murder was found by C.R. Flint and Samantha "Sam" Larabee. Carmen's body is found later in the ocean by G.D. Thibodeaux. Prudence Connor is discovered to have had an affair with Nate Flint.; Killer Clues: 1; At the beginning of the episode, the killer leaves a video of 15 suspects (1 of which is the killer). 2; Kristen discovers the remains of "The Bonny Rose", a boat owned by the late Oscar Blodgett.
2	"Episode 2"
Lifeguard: Kristen; Suspect Cleared: X-Ray; Sent to play the Killer's Game: Group's Pick: Andy (7-1) - Old Mustard Mill; Lifeguard's Pick: Brian - House at 45 Kendall Road; Eliminated: Andy; Notes: Oscar Blodgett's body was dug up by the killer.; Killer Clues: Brian discovers a can of sardines with the Kingfisher logo on the can. Inside the can are a set of fingers, (left ring and pinky finger) that belong to Nate Flint. They are pack in oil and mustard, the old way of packing fish, and were treated with chemicals that are used in taxidermy.
3	"Episode 3"
Lifeguard: Alan; Suspect Cleared: Leita Rose-Blodgett; Sent to play the Killer's Game: Group's Pick: Kristen (5-2) - Sunrise Theater; Lifeguard's Pick: Lindsey - The Verdant Hothouses; Eliminated: Lindsey; Notes: Jimmy Tinker is seen driving Abby Flint's car by X-Ray.; Killer Clues: Not shown till the next episode, it is a roll of 16mm film featuring "The Burnt Face Man" recalling his most earliest memory in 1941 when he was 8 years old somehow escaping a fire, being found by a fishing boat 40 miles off the coast, being brought to Bar Harbor and not seeing the town of Sunrise until he "was a man".
4	"Episode 4"
Lifeguard: Brian; Suspect Cleared: Drew Chambers; Sent to play the Killer's Game: Group's Pick: Kristen (5-1) - Grady Point Lighthouse; Lifeguard's Pick: Stacey - The Marine Supply Warehouse; Eliminated: Stacey; Notes: Leita Rose-Blodgett is murdered by the killer at the beginning of the episode.; Killer Clues: The Lost At Sea monument, which is a hand coming up from out of the ground. The base of the monument held name plates with one of the names (in this case, Duchamps), circled in blood.
5	"Episode 5"
Lifeguard: Jeff; Suspects Cleared: Deanna Harris, G.D. Thibodeaux^{3}; Sent to play the Killer's Game: Group's Pick: Brian (3-2) - Kingfisher Aquaculture; Lifeguard's Pick: Kristen - Thibodeaux's Cabin; Eliminated: Brian; Notes: Kristen finds G.D. Thibodeaux dying at his house, and she and X-Ray rush him to the hospital.; Killer Clues: 1; Kristen returns with another 16mm film, again of "The Burnt Face Man", talking about how he rigged The Bonny Rose (the clue from episode 1) by wrapping 8 feet of primacord around a propane tank and setting it off with a 6-hour kitchen timer, in the process murdering Oscar Blodgett. 2; G.D. Thibodeaux is also discovered wounded^{3}.
6	"Episode 6"
Lifeguard: Katie; Suspect Cleared: Samantha "Sam" Larabee; Sent to play the Killer's Game: Group's Pick: Jeff and Kristen (2-2)^{1} - Jeff to Storage House behind DeBeck's Compound; Lifeguard's Pick: Jeff and Kristen - Kristen to Sunrise Junkyard; Eliminated: Kristen; Notes: G.D. Thibodeaux is killed by the killer at the beginning of the episode. Hayden DeBeck and Rusty Crandall later suffer a car accident, and the killer murders Hayden. Kristen is sent out to the play the Killer's Game for the fifth time, and this time she is finally eliminated.; Killer Clues: 1; Jeff finds a giant sword with the initial "OSL" on it when it bursts into flames. 2; Not shown till the next episode, a piece of ripped paper with some visible words. Also on the paper is a picture of the same sword logo.
7	"Episode 7"
Lifeguard: Ángel; Suspects Cleared: Hayden DeBeck, Mary-Elizabeth Merchant, Emerson Bowden; Sent to play the Killer's Game: Group's Pick: Katie (2-1) - Sunrise High School; Lifeguard's Pick: Jeff - Kingfisher Cannery; Eliminated: Katie; Notes: Mary-Elizabeth Merchant is murdered while she, Alan, and Katie are taking care of C.R. Flint.; Killer Clues: Jeff finds a vault hidden behind a wall, again with a picture of the "OSL" logo. At the beginning of the next episode the vault is opened to the discovery of 8 bodies. Also found are crates with the "OSL" logo, empty liquor bottles, 24 rows of tobacco, and a "white powdery substance" which the investigators believe is cocaine.
8	"Finale"
Lifeguard: Ángel; Suspect Cleared: Rusty Crandall; Sent to play the Killer's Game: Alan and Jeff^{2} - Alan to the Flints' House, Jeff to DeBeck's Compound; Eliminated: Jeff; Notes: C.R. Flint passes away due to a brain embolism.; Killer Clues: The final Killer Clue, Alan comes back with another 16mm film. "The Burnt Face Man" holds up a picture of him as a child with his family during Thanksgiving of 1941 and said how the OSL (Order of the Scarlet Lupin), namely Oscar Blodgett, Hayden DeBeck, and Calvin Roosevelt Flint (C.R. Flint) locked the family up and burned them alive after the government came across the group's bootlegging scheme and stated that everyone, including a pregnant woman, died in the fire. He continues with saying how the fire was to get rid of all the evidence of the liquor and tobacco as well as the Duchamps, as they knew all about the illegal smuggling. "The Burnt Face Man" also talks about how he had returned to take revenge on the members of the OSL, but after killing Blodgett, he had "become a monster" and was going to take his own life. Telling his child that they are too little to understand and that the video will be sent to his child long after he is gone, "The Burnt Face Man" ends his last video with his final words ".... Goodbye, my son."; Suspects Cleared: Prudence Connor^{5}, Jimmy Tinker^{6}, Frank Kovick; The Final Confrontation: Alan: Frank Kovick - Kovick's Boathouse; Ángel: William Lambert - Lambert's House; The Killer: William Lambert; The Runner-Up: Alan; The Winner: Ángel; Notes: Samantha "Sam" Larabee is kidnapped by the killer. Alan and Ángel pursue their suspects, and the killer turns out to be William Lambert. Alan is eliminated at Kovick's Boathouse (but is not murdered), Samantha is rescued and Dudley Duncan shoots William. Emerson Bowden rewards Ángel with a check for $250,000 and the keys to a new Jeep Liberty Sport SUV for solving the mystery. After the killer is uncovered, a letter, still in Lambert's hands, is opened and read, stating, "I was a child when you went away, so in yours eyes I never grew up. When my mother died, I found your film, and I knew what I had to do to become a man. Now I've completed your life's work. Your loving son, William."

== Death of Ángel Juarbe Jr. ==
Exactly one week after the airing of the finale, the show's winner, Ángel Juarbe Jr, being a seven-year veteran of the FDNY, was one of the first responders in the World Trade Center during the September 11 attacks. It was initially reported that he was caught in the collapse of the first tower, but later determined that Juarbe was caught in the collapse of the adjoining Marriott Hotel while he and a lieutenant from his ladder company were attempting to rescue another firefighter. He was officially listed as missing. On November 28, 2001, his death was confirmed as his body was found and identified in the Marriott hotel rubble next to the World Trade Center towers. The show's primary icon, the fisherman statue, was repurposed as a memorial to Juarbe.

== Cancellation ==
The series did not achieve strong ratings and was not renewed by Fox. The format was sold to the BBC who made a British version (with slight amendments to the rules) in 2003 entitled The Murder Game. Ratings were poor and the program was not a critical success.

== International versions ==
Country	Name	Host	Network	Date premiered	Prize
Brazil	O Jogo	Zeca Camargo	Rede Globo	May 25, 2003 – July 29, 2003	R$250.000
United Kingdom	The Murder Game	Bob Taylor	BBC	29 March 2003 – 17 May 2003	£25,000

== See also ==
- Murder (2007 TV series)
- Whodunnit? (2013 TV series)
- Escape the Night
- Busted!
