= MTV, Bota Essa P Pra Funcionar =

2014 book

MTV, Bota Essa P#@% Pra Funcionar
- Author: Zico Goes (General Editor)
- Language: Portuguese
- Published: 12 March 2014
- Publisher: Panda Books

MTV, Bota Essa P#@% Pra Funcionar is a biographical novel written by Zico Goes, released on 12 March 2014 by Panda Books.

The idea for the book came after the open TV channel MTV Brasil was sold and the brand was returned to the American company Viacom. The title for the book came after a live complaint made by Caetano Veloso on MTV Video Music Brasil 2004 in which after successive errors in the technical part regarding the audio, Veloso said: "Emetevê's people, shame on your face! Let's start again! Put this p... to work!".

== Synopsis ==
Zico Goes tells in the book his time at MTV Brasil, where he worked for 20 years. When the station announced that it would arrive in the country, Goes auditioned to work on the channel, but did not pass. A year later, he was called by Zeca Camargo to work as a freelancer in the journalism department. In 1992, he was hired by the channel to be a writer for the house's programs. With the help of André Vaisman, he arrived at the programming department and after four years he reached the position of programming director. In 2008, he left the station and returned after two and a half years.

He says that the channel became the first segmented channel in the country, which was something usual in the United States, the country where MTV's mother channel was created. In Brazil, the newly created channel was driven by great musicians and bands from the '90s era such as Titãs, Barão Vermelho, Legião Urbana, among others. The presenters called VJs had total freedom at the station, which was internally called "uma não TV".
