= Hipertensão season 1 =

Hipertensão
- Season 1
- Starring: Zeca Camargo
- No. of episodes: 4

Release
- Original network: Rede Globo
- Original release: 14 April – 5 May 2002

Season chronology
- Next → Season 2

Hipertensão (season 1) was the first season of the Brazilian stunt/dare reality television show Hipertensão, which premiered April 14, 2002, with the season finale airing May 5, 2002 on the Rede Globo television network.

== Overview ==
The series debuted as a replacement on April 14, 2002. The first season was planned to be displayed for exacts four weeks (plus a celebrity special) during the break month between the first two seasons of Big Brother Brasil. However, even the short run prevented the series from being subject to criticism and controversy.

== Format ==
The season 1 format involved three men and three women, who had to complete three professional stunts to win R$50,000. If a contestant was too scared to attempt a stunt, failed to complete a stunt, or (in some cases) had the worst performance on a stunt, they were eliminated from the competition.

== Production ==
=== Cast ===
There was no application process for the series first season. The twenty-four contestants (six in each of the four episodes) were selected from applications received for another Rede Globo shows, such No Limite 3 (2001) and Big Brother Brasil 1 (2002).

=== Filming ===
Filming took place at the montane region of the state of Rio de Janeiro in Brazil. The coastal zone of the same state was also used. Filming run from early-April, 2002, until mid-May, 2002.

== Episodes ==
=== Episode 1 ===
First Air Date: April 14, 2002

Contestants

Name	Age	Occupation
Fabio	25	Airway
Sergio	25	Public Relations
Ildazio	35	Administrator
Bianka	27	Student
Ladjane	46	P.E. Teacher
Cristiane	23	Model

In Stunt 1, contestants would be riding on the back of a jet ski as a helicopter flew overhead. They would have to grab on to the helicopter skit and use the cargo netting to climb into the helicopter. In Stunt 2, contestants would have to drink a drink containing 6 earthworms, 4 beetles and 1 cockroach. In Stunt 3, contestants would have to walk across a 6 1/2-inch-wide (170 mm) balance beam over 100 feet high, retrieve a flag, walk back across, and plant the flag. The contestant to do this the fastest would win the $50,000.

Contestant	Stunt			Result
Contestant	1	2	3	Result
Fabio	PASS	PASS	WIN	Winner
Sergio	PASS	PASS	OUT	2nd
Ildazio	PASS	PASS	OUT	3rd
Bianka	PASS	OUT		4th
Ladjane	OUT			5th
Cristiane	OUT			6th

=== Episode 2 ===
First Air Date: April 21, 2002

Contestants

Name	Age	Occupation
Márcia	26	Promoter
Roberto	28	Trainer
Hamilton	31	Trader
Franciele	19	Seller
Heloísa	31	Shopkeeper
Ruy	40	Manager

In Stunt 1, the contestants would have to jump off a tower 30 meters high and hold on for five seconds to a network positioned 2.5 meters away. In Stunt 2, the contestants must to remain four minutes stranded in a pit with 300 rats. In Stunt 3, the contestants would be hung by their ankles over 130 feet high and dropped down a zip line at 60 miles per hour. As they went over a large target, they would have to drop a beanbag. The contestant whose beanbag landed closest to the bull's-eye would win the $50,000.

Contestant	Stunt			Result
Contestant	1	2	3	Result
Marcia	PASS	PASS	WIN	Winner
Roberto	PASS	PASS	OUT	2nd
Hamilton	PASS	PASS	OUT	3rd
Franciele	PASS	OUT		4th
Heloísa	OUT			5th
Ruy	OUT			6th

=== Episode 3 ===
First Air Date: April 28, 2002

Contestants

Name	Age	Occupation
Tainah	21	Law Student
Andrea	32	Police Officer
Fabyola	30	Model
Beatriz	40	Swimmer
Malibu	44	M.A. Teacher
Creo	29	Actor

In Stunt 1, the contestants were dragged by two horses on a road covered with mud. In Stunt 2, the contestants facing an aquarium with 25 snakes, where they had to "fish" plums with their own mouths. In Stunt 3 the contestants had to go into a sewer pipe and try to find the exit faster than the others. The contestant who find the exit first would win the $50,000.

Contestant	Stunt			Result
Contestant	1	2	3	Result
Tainah	PASS	PASS	WIN	Winner
Andrea	PASS	PASS	OUT	2nd
Fabyola	PASS	PASS	OUT	3rd
Beatriz	PASS	OUT		4th
Malibu	OUT			5th
Creo	OUT			6th

=== Episode 4 ===
First Air Date: May 05, 2002

Contestants

Name	Age	Occupation
Franz	28	P.E. Teacher
Camila	22	P.E. Teacher
Silvana	34	Not Announced
Kátia	34	Pilot
Luís	31	Football Referee
Marco	27	Trainer

In Stunt 1, the contestants had to jump from one to another truck at 60 miles an hour. In Stunt 2, the contestants eating crickets. In Stunt 3, the contestants had to hold the breath for as long as possible, dipped upside down in a water tank; The contestant to do this the fastest would win the $50,000.

Contestant	Stunt			Result
Contestant	1	2	3	Result
Franz	PASS	PASS	WIN	Winner
Camila	PASS	PASS	OUT	2nd
Silvana	PASS	PASS	OUT	3rd
Kátia	PASS	OUT		4th
Luís	OUT			5th
Marco	OUT			6th

== Criticism and Controversy ==
The season, which lasted only five weeks, received mixed reviews. São Paulo Public Ministry established a public civil inquiry to investigate the show. Lawyer Leonardo Fogaça Pantaleon even hinted that the show humiliated people and hurt the citizens rights.
