= The Murder Game (TV series) =

- Genre: Reality / Murder mystery
- Created by: George Verschoor, Robert Fisher Jr., and Gordon Cassidy (for FOX)
- Developed by: FOX/BBC
- Directed by: Ewen Thomson
- Presented by: Bob Taylor (The Chief) (author of Crimebuster)
- Narrated by: Rupert Smith
- Composers: Sophia Morizet, Helene Muddiman
- Country of origin: United Kingdom
- Original language: English
- No. of seasons: 1
- No. of episodes: 9

Production
- Executive producer: Conrad Green
- Producers: Ewen Thomson, Nichola Hegarty, Aidan Hansell (reality producer), David Newcombe (drama producer)
- Production locations: Maldon, Brentwood, Essex, England, UK
- Cinematography: Janet Tovey
- Editor: David Tibballs
- Running time: 60 mins
- Production companies: BBC; Fox World UK

Original release
- Network: BBC One, BBC Three
- Release: 29 March – 24 May 2003

Related
- Murder in Small Town X

The Murder Game is a British reality television series that aired on BBC One from March to May 2003. The show was based on the American Fox series Murder in Small Town X. Though classified as a reality television series, it was more accurately a hybrid of reality TV, game show, and mystery drama. The series was narrated by Rupert Smith. Although there was no host in the traditional sense, Bob Taylor, as "the Chief", served a similar role on the show.

== Premise ==
In the fictional town of Blackwater, a woman named Catherine Prior had been murdered. Ten contestants from the British public were set the challenge of becoming investigators and finding her killer. The investigators were led by Bob Taylor, known as the Chief Investigator or the Chief, who was in real life a retired Detective Chief Superintendent from the West Yorkshire Police. The people of the town, played by actors, formed the pool of suspects, some of whom later became victims themselves.

At the beginning of each episode, one investigator was appointed Lead Investigator, a role carrying specific responsibilities and powers. The Lead Investigator split the others into teams, which were sent down different lines of inquiry determined by the Chief. Each line of inquiry involved a hidden test, which the team either passed or failed as judged by the Chief.

=== The Killer's Game ===
At some point during each episode's investigation days, the killer would leave a message revealing two locations, usually accompanied by the taunting phrase "coming out to play?". This signalled the start of the episode's elimination segment, the Killer's Game. The teams were then passed or failed on their lines of inquiry, and the investigators who had failed were put up for a group vote. Every investigator except the Lead Investigator could vote, and the investigator receiving the most votes became the first player of the Game. The Lead Investigator then chose any investigator to be the second player. The two chosen investigators each picked from two envelopes to determine who would go to which of the two locations — for example, the first two locations of the series were "The Old Oaks" and "The Power Museum". The Chief then gave the players one hour to pack their bags and prepare to play the Killer's Game. As the finale, episode 9 featured two Killer's Games; the first of these used a different selection process, with the Chief sending out the investigators who had failed the most lines of inquiry over the course of the series.

In the Killer's Game, the two selected investigators were sent completely alone to two different remote locations, their movements recorded only by a head-mounted camera. Equipped with a torch, each had to follow a map to the spot where a "clue" was located. One of the two would discover an important clue to help solve the mystery, while the other would be eliminated from the show by being "murdered" by the killer. The survivor's return through the entrance doors signalled that he or she had chosen correctly and would continue in the game.

The eliminated contestant chose the Lead Investigator for the next episode by means of a pre-recorded "last will and testament".

== Story ==
Catherine Prior's father, Tony Wilmington, had given her £20,000 and the Wilmington Jewel, and she planned to leave the town of Blackwater forever, taking her daughter Anya with her. Trevor Dobie, however, heard of Catherine's plans and began threatening her. Catherine left home and broke into Jay Wilmington's barge, where she spent the night, taking a pair of navigational dividers with her as protection. The following day, Goldie was due to marry Jay Wilmington. Jennifer Wilmington picked Catherine up on the way to the church and saw that she was wearing the priceless necklace the family had believed missing. Jennifer called Jay to try to get it back, but failed; Jay then called Goldie and asked her to persuade Catherine to hand over the necklace, but Catherine refused. Meanwhile, Trevor continued to pester Catherine over Anya.

Later, Trevor arrived at the church, where Catherine was rehearsing for the wedding, intending to make her admit on camera that he was Anya's father. As he entered the church, his phone rang and he rejected the call. The call was from Jay, phoning from a telephone box to tell Trevor to stop hassling Catherine. Jay was the man in the brown checked shirt seen by the witness Edward Green; he was wearing the same shirt when Sam, Nick, and Christine saw him at the morgue the day after Catherine was attacked, at which point he said he had not changed his clothes in twenty-four hours. Jay therefore had an alibi without realising it. Trevor demanded that Catherine admit Anya was his daughter, which she did. However, she told him that he had never been a proper father to Anya and never would be, as the two of them planned to leave Blackwater. When Trevor asked how she could afford to do so, she told him that Tony Wilmington was her father and had given her the money to get away. Trevor had always hated the Wilmingtons because Felicity Wilmington had killed his mother's baby in an attempt to save the family name. He attacked Catherine, who tried to defend herself with the navigational dividers she had taken from Jay's barge; Trevor wrestled them from her and used them to stab her. He then took the necklace, hoping to use it to frame Jay or Jennifer, and kept it from the murder onwards. Why he chose to play the Killer's Game with the investigators is never explained.

== Investigators ==
Investigator	Age	Profession	Eliminated	Final Killer's Game Location
Christine Rose	38	Housewife	Episode 2	The Power Museum
Sarita Raval	28	Recruitment Consultant	Episode 3	The Tyre Yard
Samantha Matthews	31	Communications Centre Officer	Episode 4	The Grain Silos
Mervin Merchant	30	Visual Merchandiser	Episode 5	The Fortress
Meryl Holt	55	Retired Legal Secretary	Episode 6	The Old Docks
Ruairi McNally	23	Railway Maintenance Worker	Episode 7	The Quarry
Richard Sharrocks	32	Commercial Pilot	Episode 8	The Bottling Plant
Nick Sykes	34	Property Developer	Episode 9	The Nuclear Bunker – Living Quarters*
Melanie "Mel" Sainz	21	Pub Landlady	Runner-up	The Grain Store
Andrew Weaver	56	Dairy Farmer	Winner	The Construction Warehouse

Note: As episode 1 was a training and introduction episode featuring no investigations, no elimination took place.

- The Nuclear Bunker comprised two locations: Andrew went to the Operational Zone and Nick to the Living Quarters.

== Suspects ==
Suspect	Played By	Relation	Outcome	Notes
Frank Prior	Colin Spaull	Father to Catherine and Goldie	1st suspect cleared	At a petrol station doing a dodgy deal
Vanessa March	Leona Ekembe	The Babysitter	2nd suspect cleared	Was buying a pregnancy test
Tina Wells	Joanne Adams	The Vicar's Wife	3rd suspect cleared	Murdered while retrieving her husband's inhaler
Dean Garretty	Graham Bryan	The Best Man	4th suspect cleared	At his showrooms sending an e-mail
George Hawick	Alan David	The Music Teacher	5th suspect cleared	Was chopping wood at his home
Jennifer Wilmington	Jo Ross	Jay's Mother	6th suspect cleared	Was visiting her solicitors about the Wilmington Jewel
Gillian "Goldie" Prior	Jo-Anne Stockham	The Bride and Catherine's sister	7th suspect cleared	At a cash point withdrawing £50 to buy flowers for Jennifer
Jay Wilmington	Luke de Lacey	The Groom	8th suspect cleared	In a telephone box trying to call Trevor
Trevor Dobie	Guy Scantlebury	The Builder	Not Cleared	The Murderer

== Teams ==
Teams	Episode 2	Episode 3	Episode 4	Episode 5	Episode 6	Episode 7	Episode 8	Finale
Team 1	Christine, Nick, and Samantha †	Mervin and Richard	Meryl and Richard ✓	Meryl and Nick ✓	Melanie, Meryl, and Richard ✓	Melanie and Ruairi †	Melanie and Nick †	Andrew, Melanie, and Nick ⁘
Team 2	Andrew, Melanie, and Mervin ✓	Meryl, Samantha, and Sarita †	Andrew, Nick, Ruairi †	Richard and Ruairi ✓	Andrew and Nick †	Andrew and Richard ✓	Andrew and Richard †	No Team 2
Team 3	Meryl, Ruairi, and Sarita †	Andrew, Melanie, and Ruairi †	Melanie and Samantha †	Andrew and Mervin †	No Team 3			
Lead Investigator	Richard	Nick	Mervin	Melanie	Ruairi	Nick	Andrew	No Lead Investigator

- † The team failed their line of inquiry
- ✓ The team passed their line of inquiry
- ⁘ There are no fails nor passes

== Voting history ==
- An * indicates that the group vote ended in a tie, resulting in a revote between the tied investigators.

Episode	2	3	4	5	6	7	8	Finale	
Eliminated	Christine	Sarita	Samantha	Mervin	Meryl	Ruairi	Richard	Nick	Melanie
Group Vote	Sarita*	Sarita*	Andrew	Andrew	Andrew	Ruairi*	Andrew	N/A	
Lead Investigator's Pick	Christine	Andrew	Samantha	Mervin	Meryl	Richard	Richard	N/A	
Group Voting
Andrew	Meryl	Meryl	Melanie	Mervin	Nick	Melanie	Richard	Six Failed	Winner
Melanie	Ruairi	Sarita	Andrew	L.I.	Andrew	Ruairi	Andrew	Four Failed	Runner-Up
Nick	Sarita	L.I.	Ruairi	Mervin	Andrew	Ruairi*	Andrew	Five Failed	
Richard	L.I.	Ruairi	Nick	Andrew	Nick	Ruairi	Melanie		
Ruairi	Meryl	Meryl	Melanie	Andrew	L.I.	Melanie			
Meryl	Ruairi	Sarita	Andrew	Andrew	Andrew				
Mervin	Nick	Richard	L.I.	Andrew					
Samantha	Sarita	Sarita	Andrew						
Sarita	Ruairi	Meryl							
Christine	Sarita								

- The first episode consisted of training for the investigators. The Killer's Game was not introduced until episode 2.
- Beginning in episode 8, the Lead Investigator was no longer immune from playing the Killer's Game, and so participated in the lines of inquiry and the group vote.
- In the finale, the final three investigators were told how many times each of them had failed their lines of inquiry. The two with the most failures played the Killer's Game.
- In the finale, the second Killer's Game required the two remaining contestants to declare who they believed to be the killer and why. Melanie answered incorrectly and became the killer's final victim. Andrew answered correctly, solved the case, and won the £25,000 prize.

The investigator's team passed their line of inquiry.
The investigator's team failed their line of inquiry.
The investigator was the lead investigator.
The investigator was the lead investigator and failed their line of inquiry.
The investigator was spared from playing the Killer's Game due to having the fewest failed lines of inquiry.
The investigator played the Killer's Game because they did not have the fewest failed lines of inquiry.
The investigator became the runner-up.
The investigator won the game.

Sarita* = Both of the first two votes ended in ties, first between Sarita and Ruairi, then between Sarita and Meryl. In both cases a revote was held, and Sarita received the most votes both times.

Ruairi* = The group vote resulted in a tie between Ruairi and Melanie. As Lead Investigator, Nick broke the tie and sent Ruairi out to play the Killer's Game.

== Episodes ==
No.	Title
1	"Training the Investigators"
The investigators undertook five days of training to learn the techniques of police investigation work and self-defence. Short biographies of the individual investigators were shown between the training footage. The episode featured no lines of inquiry, and the Killer's Game had not yet been introduced.
2	"Episode 2"
Lead Investigator: Richard The first day began with the investigators arriving in Blackwater and stopping outside the church, the scene of a gruesome attack on Catherine Prior, who had been practising for the wedding of Jay Wilmington and Goldie Prior due to take place that afternoon. Catherine was taken to hospital but succumbed to her injuries in transit. The investigators began by choosing a leader, unanimously selecting Richard as Lead Investigator, before the Chief arrived to take charge of the investigation.: Team 1: Christine, Nick, and Samantha; Day 1: Gather evidence at the crime scene.; Hidden Test: Remember their training on gathering evidence.; The investigators gathered evidence from the crime scene inside the church. As they searched for clues, a banging was heard at the door; when Nick opened it, they discovered a noose left outside the church along with a ringing mobile phone — the killer's introduction to the Killer's Game. The investigators consulted the Lead Investigator, Richard, on whether they should answer the phone. Richard advised them to do so, which they did through an evidence bag, but the call was silent. When the Chief asked whether the phone had been answered, Nick denied it; this initially went unnoticed, but the truth was discovered on the second day after a review of the team's work.: Day 2: Go to the morgue and collect Catherine's possessions.; Hidden Test: Do not give away too much information to Goldie and Jay.; The investigators went to the morgue and encountered Jay and Goldie as they were leaving. The suspects asked numerous questions, including about the whereabouts of a necklace, but the investigators gave nothing away.: Result: Fail — Nick answered Catherine's mobile phone, which could have affected the phone records.; Team 2: Andrew, Melanie, and Mervin; Day 1: Visit Frank and Goldie Prior and inform them of Catherine's murder. Question them on their movements at the time.; Hidden Test: Remember their training on family liaison.; Melanie began questioning Goldie and Frank until a child entered the room, identified as Catherine's daughter, Anya. Mervin advised against continuing while Anya was present, and Melanie requested privacy before proceeding. The investigators then questioned both suspects on their movements throughout the day.: Day 2: Visit Frank Prior and verify his story from the previous day.; Hidden Test: Notice that Frank has changed his story and follow up on it.; The investigators asked Frank to confirm his movements and noted that he omitted his previous statement about visiting a petrol station. As a result, CCTV footage from the petrol station in question was requested to establish whether he had been there.: Result: Pass — the team ensured Anya was out of the room and caught Frank changing his story, which subsequently cleared him.; Team 3: Meryl, Ruairi, and Sarita; Day 1: Visit Dean Garretty and retrieve his video tape.; Hidden Test: Recognise that the theft of Dean's camera makes his office a crime scene and act accordingly.; When the video tape was requested, Dean realised the camera containing it had been stolen. In the confusion that followed, Sarita allowed Dean to leave the scene, and the investigators returned to HQ.: Day 2: Visit Dean again.; Hidden Test: Do not tamper with the camera.; The investigators were to visit Dean at his home, but upon their arrival the previously missing wedding car pulled out of the driveway at high speed. The investigators pursued the car until the driver stopped at a disused railway and threw an object off a bridge into the overgrowth below. Further pursuit was blocked by a tractor. Sarita coordinated a systematic search of the area, which led to Ruairi finding Dean's missing video camera. The investigators discussed watching the tape inside it, but Meryl successfully argued against doing so. When the tape was later reviewed, it showed the attack on Catherine and revealed the next Killer's Game.: Result: Fail — the team failed to recognise the crime scene on day one.; Killer's Calling Card: On Day 1, the killer left a noose at the church door with Polaroids reading "Come out to play" and "I am one of the nine". Later that night, while the investigators were having dinner together, the killer hurled a brick through the conservatory window with a wreath tied to it by a rope, along with a set of nine Polaroids each marked "Killer?", referring to the nine suspects in the investigation. On Day 2, the investigators reviewed the recovered video tape, which turned out to show Catherine's attack and murder. The footage showed the killer entering the church — the sound of a phone ringing is heard before being abruptly cut off — and heading up to the organ where Catherine was practising before attacking her. Speaking in a distorted voice, the killer told the investigators, "You think this is a game", as Catherine lay bleeding on the floor, adding "I know who you are" over footage of the investigators eating dinner at HQ the previous night. The killer then revealed the locations via Polaroids captioned "Meet me at The Old Oaks", "Meet me at The Power Museum", "Alone, tonight" and "One of you will not come back!". The video ended with a reversed recording of "coming out to play" as Catherine lay near-lifeless and the sound of a heartbeat faded away.: Team's Pick: Sarita (3-3-2-1); Note: The group vote was tied between Sarita and Ruairi, and was decided by a group revote.; Location: The Old Oaks; Lead Investigator's Pick: Christine, for (in the Lead Investigator's opinion) not possessing any individual qualities that would be required later on.; Location: The Power Museum; Eliminated: Christine; Killer Clue: Sarita returned with a key labelled "Mill Fields", believed to unlock Catherine's caravan. It did not open it, as it was later revealed that Frank Prior, Catherine's father, had changed the locks.
3	"Episode 3"
Lead Investigator: Nick: Team 1: Mervin and Richard; Day 1: Go to Catherine's caravan.; Hidden Test: Find a clue.; The clue was a scribbled note on an envelope, apparently referring to a meeting arranged to take place the following day.: Day 2: Follow up on the clue found at Catherine's caravan.; Hidden Test: Observe without being spotted.; The investigators were spotted by Dean, who fled the scene, but they managed to hide in time to witness Vanessa arrive for the meeting. They overheard her contact Dean by mobile phone and question him about missing their long-scheduled meeting.: Result: Fail — the team was spotted by Dean Garretty.; Team 2: Meryl, Samantha, and Sarita; Day 1: Check Dean's abandoned car for evidence.; Hidden Test: Remove the car tracker as evidence.; The investigators searched the now burnt-out car for evidence, and Samantha identified the tracker. However, none of the investigators knew the purpose of a tracker, so they left it in the car and returned to HQ. The Chief sent out his special unit to recover the tracker, which provided evidence that the car had been driven to the Sluice Pond in the early hours of the morning before returning.: Day 2: Search the Sluice Pond for the murder weapon.; Hidden Test: Find the right object.; The investigators expected the Sluice Pond to be the dumping ground of the murder weapon. Unbeknownst to them, it contained four metal items: three dummies and the actual weapon. One of the four — a bent iron pipe — was found before Sarita broke both metal detectors, forcing the investigators to perform a fingertip search of the pond. Upon finding the second of the four items, a trowel, the investigators believed they had found the murder weapon and returned to HQ.: Result: Fail — the team did not retrieve the tracker and brought back the wrong item from the pond. The Chief sent out his special unit again to retrieve the actual weapon: a pair of navigational dividers later identified as belonging to Jay Wilmington.; Team 3: Andrew, Melanie, and Ruairi; Day 1: Go to Creeksea Place and interview Jennifer Wilmington. Interview Jay Wilmington at his barge and investigate the break-in.; Hidden Test: Be thorough and remember the correct procedure for collecting fingerprints.; While Andrew interviewed Jay, the other two investigators dusted only the exterior handle for prints. Melanie collected the sole print they found on the door handle, leading them to believe they had completed their task, and they returned to HQ.: Day 2: Return to Creeksea and plant a bug on Jennifer Wilmington.; Hidden Test: Don't get caught.; The investigators placed the hidden bugs around the living room as requested and chose to place the personal bug in a cardigan belonging to Jennifer. Although they were not caught placing the bugs or spotted later while under cover in the old shed, they left behind several items indicating that someone had recently been there: a camera battery in a zip-lock bag, an earpiece, and a bottle half full of urine.: Result: Fail — the team did not dust thoroughly for prints and missed those on the pane of glass the perpetrator had removed from the frame to open the door. The Chief sent in his special unit to collect the missed fingerprints. Forensics found two prints: one belonging to Jay Wilmington, the owner of the boat, and the other to Catherine Prior.; Killer's Calling Card: On the morning of Day 2, the investigators were woken by banging noises. When Meryl, Mel, and Sarita went to look, they found that the killer had left blood-covered Polaroids on the windows of Investigator HQ bearing the locations "The Tyre Yard" and "Dead End Farm".: Team's Pick: Sarita (3-3-1-1); Note: The vote was tied between Sarita and Meryl, and was decided by a group revote.; Location: The Tyre Yard; Lead Investigator's Pick: Andrew, for (in the Lead Investigator's opinion) not being as involved in the inquiry as the other investigators, particularly when the killer visited HQ overnight and left the blood-stained Polaroids attached to the windows.; Location: Dead End Farm; Eliminated: Sarita; Killer Clue: Andrew returned with a pill box belonging to Jennifer Wilmington, which she was later found to have reported missing a month earlier. It bore the inscription "Death And His Brother", a quote from a Mary Shelley story.
4	"Episode 4"
Lead Investigator: Mervin: Team 1: Meryl and Richard; Day 1: Interview Trevor Dobie and ask if he knows he is Anya's father. Interview Jennifer Wilmington about the pill box.; Hidden Test: Protect the evidence.; The investigators questioned the suspects separately, first asking Trevor about his knowledge of being Anya's father, which he denied while appearing surprised but pleased. They then asked Jennifer about the pill box; she confirmed it was hers and had been missing for some time. She requested it back, but the investigators assured her it was best kept with them.: Day 2: Carry out an aerial reconnaissance of the area.; Hidden Test: Spot a vital piece of evidence.; The investigators spotted the vital evidence: a red coat hanging in a tree, containing a wedding invitation addressed to Tina Wells. They also realised that the area was quite large and suspected Catherine may have needed assistance to reach the church in time to rehearse.: Result: Pass; Team 2: Andrew, Nick, and Ruairi; Day 1: Interview Jay Wilmington about Catherine breaking into his barge.; Hidden Test: Follow the procedure for interviewing multiple suspects.; The investigators did not separate Jay and Goldie when asking Jay about the discovery that Catherine had broken into his boat. Because the investigators questioned Jay about his relationship with Catherine in front of Goldie, she decided to leave, and Andrew attempted to catch up with her so that she could be interviewed.: Day 2: Interview Vanessa March about her relationship with Dean.; Hidden Test: Confirm her story by checking the credit card receipt.; Vanessa told the investigators that she had sent Dean out to purchase a pregnancy test, which was negative, although she had told Dean it was positive. The investigators obtained the credit card receipt from the chemist where the test was purchased, noting that it had been signed and that the time of purchase would provide the signer with an alibi. They requested copies of both Dean's and Vanessa's signatures, and during the nightly meeting Ruairi spotted that Vanessa's matched the receipt. The investigators were able to clear Vanessa, as she had an alibi for the time of the murder, though it was noted that she had also attempted to provide a cover story for Dean.: Result: Fail — the team did not separate Goldie and Jay.; Team 3: Melanie and Samantha; Day 1: Interview George Hawick about his movements on the day of Catherine's murder, as phone records showed he was the caller when Nick answered the phone.; Hidden Test: Establish whether George has an alibi.; The investigators deduced that even though George claimed he had been cut off by the tide over the causeway, he could have used a boat to reach the mainland before the time Catherine was murdered. They therefore established that the tide did not provide George with an alibi.: Day 2: Hold a press conference.; Hidden Test: Only reveal what is in the public domain.; The press asked a series of questions, all but one of which could have been answered. The investigators had previously asked Mervin, the Lead Investigator, how they should approach the conference; he advised them to refuse any general questions and to use the conference solely to appeal for information on Catherine's last known movements. As a result, the press posed their questions to Frank and Goldie only, who left the conference when the questioning became intrusive.: Result: Fail — the team did not answer any questions at the conference.; Killer's Calling Card: During the night of Day 1, after the investigators had gone to sleep, the killer hacked into HQ's computer, waking everyone as the killer's voice played and images flashed up showing the locations "The Deserted Railway" and "The Grain Silos", each accompanied by the words "Alone" and "Tonight".: Team's Pick: Andrew; Location: The Deserted Railway; Lead Investigator's Pick: Samantha, for (in the Lead Investigator's opinion) not being fully prepared for the press conference.; Location: The Grain Silos; Eliminated: Samantha; Killer Clue: Andrew returned with an old newspaper clipping announcing Catherine's birth.
5	"Episode 5"
Lead Investigator: Melanie: Team 1: Meryl and Nick; Day 1: Interview Tina Wells about the coat found by Meryl and Richard containing her wedding invitation.; Hidden Test: Look out for anything suspicious.; Tina told the investigators about a secret Catherine had divulged to her two weeks before her murder, involving the Wilmington house, "Alice's Room", and something within it that would "change everything". While speaking to them, Tina received what appeared to be a silent nuisance call. Meryl asked about it, and Tina admitted she had been receiving such calls at home and on her mobile, before insisting she be allowed to leave to carry on with her errands. Meryl asked whether she owned a red coat; Tina confirmed she did, but said she kept it at the church as a spare and that it should still be there if they wanted it, before cycling off. Later that night, Tina called the incident office to report a disturbance in the graveyard. Meryl and Nick went to investigate and found that a grave had been tampered with. Deciding it was in the best interests of the investigation, they began digging into the grave for clues, hearing noises nearby as they worked and keeping watch on their surroundings. They eventually unearthed a photo album containing a photograph from the 1930s and Polaroids of the two Killer's Game locations.: Day 2: Observe the suspects at the wake.; Hidden Test: Gather any relevant information.; The investigators were approached by Vanessa and Tina. Vanessa told them that Anya had said her father used to be violent towards Catherine. Both Tina and Vanessa stated that they did not know who the father was, as Catherine had never told them, although Tina added that she found it a coincidence that Catherine had been threatened by the father and was now dead. Tina also stated that Catherine had been seeing Dean before she died, and that Dean was also seeing Vanessa — for which reason Tina considered him untrustworthy.: Result: Pass; Team 2: Richard and Ruairi; Day 1: Interview the witnesses.; Hidden Test: Identify the correct statement.; The investigators interviewed three witnesses, using the killer's tape and the pathologist's report to confirm or refute their statements. They concluded that the first witness, Zoe, was mistaken, as the killer's tape showed that Catherine was left-handed rather than right-handed. They also established that the second witness, Mary, was mistaken, as the pathologist reported that Catherine wore contact lenses and so could not have put on glasses as Mary described. This left Edward's statement as the correct one, providing the investigators with clues as to who else might have seen Catherine before she died.: Day 2: Attend the funeral and interview Jennifer Wilmington about being seen by Edward dropping Catherine at the church.; Hidden Test: Keep the suspects separate when interviewing them.; The investigators confronted Jennifer with the eyewitness statement, and she began telling them what had happened and what the witnessed argument was about when Trevor Dobie, another suspect, approached. After failing to move Jennifer far enough away from Trevor, Richard left Ruairi to continue taking Jennifer's statement while he led Trevor away.: Result: Pass; Team 3: Andrew and Mervin; Day 1: Interview Jay Wilmington about the navigational dividers.; Hidden Test: Keep the case details about the murder weapon confidential.; The investigators established that the dividers belonged to Jay, but that they had been missing for a few days and he had assumed he misplaced them.: Day 2: Visit Felicity Wilmington and search Alice's Room.; Hidden Test: Remember their training and act accordingly.; The investigators gained access to the room and discovered its secret: the mummified remains of a baby. They decided to photograph the scene, but also to close the door to the adjacent box room where the remains were found and return to HQ, taking the secret with them before the rest of the Wilmington family returned home.: Result: Fail — they failed to follow the process for dealing with a crime scene. As a result, the evidence and the corpse could have been destroyed by Jennifer had she discovered them herself, rendering the photographs inadmissible in court. The Chief sent in his special unit to seal off the scene and collect the evidence.; Killer's Calling Card: While digging into the grave at the church graveyard, Meryl and Nick found a photo album containing a picture of the Wilmingtons in the 1930s and Polaroids bearing the locations "The Hospital" and "The Fortress".: Team's Pick: Andrew; Location: The Hospital; Lead Investigator's Pick: Mervin, for (in the Lead Investigator's opinion) causing divisions within the group and poor decision-making in the past.; Location: The Fortress; Eliminated: Mervin; Killer Clue: Andrew returned with the necklace Catherine was wearing in the killer's video. It is the Wilmington Jewel, though its main pendant is missing.
6	"Episode 6"
Lead Investigator: Ruairi: Team 1: Melanie, Meryl, and Richard; Day 1: Interview the Wilmingtons about the dead baby.; Hidden Test: Check Felicity's story for inconsistencies.; Felicity informed the investigators that the baby was hers and had been born premature. Although the preliminary forensic report given to them before the visit stated that the baby appeared full term, they believed her until the full post-mortem confirmed that the baby was not premature. They were then able to use the box of family tree information collected from Tina, along with their knowledge of Trevor's mother, to establish that the dead baby was likely Dorothy's, not Felicity's. During the night of Day 1, the Chief was informed of a disturbance at a local farm, and a search team was sent out with sniffer dogs and a piece of Tina's clothing. The investigators accompanied them to investigate the find. Following the dogs, they located the body of Tina Wells in a grain store. However, they failed to spot a message from the killer — a knife through an animal heart, along with the locations of the next Killer's Game.: Day 2: Visit the nursing home of Trevor's mother, Dorothy.; Hidden Test: Remember the date on the Dictaphone tape.; The investigators established which nursing home Dorothy had lived in before her death and spoke to a resident who might remember Catherine's visit. The date on the Dictaphone tape enabled the resident to check his diary and confirm that Catherine had been there speaking to Dorothy.: Result: Pass; Team 2: Andrew and Nick; Day 1: Confront Trevor Dobie about threatening Catherine. Attend to the break-in and vandalism at Tina's property.; Hidden Test: Look out for a key visual clue.; The break-in was phoned in before they could confront Trevor. The investigators attended the property, where Tina stated that she was still receiving silent calls, including some before the break-in. The investigators gathered evidence before moving on to their main line of inquiry. The Lead Investigator, Ruairi, informed them that Catherine's phone records had arrived and that Trevor had called her minutes before she was murdered. Trevor admitted making the call but claimed he could not remember much of the conversation. Andrew spotted the visual clue: the same picture previously discovered in the photo album that the killer had buried for the investigators to find. Trevor informed them that his mother, Dorothy, was the maid in the photo. This new information distracted the investigators, who failed to confront Trevor about the threats he had been making towards Catherine. During the night of Day 1, the investigators were sent to protect Tina Wells, who felt she was being watched and was frightened. She received another silent phone call while Andrew was in attendance, but he failed to notice that there were eight new messages on the voicemail. Tina's husband suffered an asthma attack upstairs, and Tina and Andrew went to assist him. When Tina ran downstairs to fetch an inhaler, her husband clung to Andrew, preventing him from following her. During this time, Tina was murdered and dragged out through a back door.: Day 2: Return to Trevor Dobie and confront him this time. Visit Dean Garretty, confront him about the threatening voicemail he left for Tina, and establish whether he has an alibi for her abduction.; Hidden Test: Spot the evidence to prove Dean's alibi.; When confronting Trevor, the investigators told him there had been accusations of him threatening and being violent towards Catherine. Because they did not mention that the accusations were levelled specifically at Anya's father, they failed to gain a valuable piece of information until Trevor himself asked whether he was being questioned because he was Anya's father. He told them he had not known he was her father and had always believed Jay to be — thus pointing the finger of suspicion at Jay for threatening Catherine. When questioned, Dean claimed to have been at the car showroom working on his laptop at the time of the abduction, as he had "a lot of work to catch up on". While the investigators were there, he received an e-mail from Jay, announced by an audible standard e-mail alert. As Dean appeared uncooperative, the investigators left for HQ, with Dean forcefully shutting his laptop as they exited the office.: Result: Fail — the team did not realise that Dean's laptop could provide him with an alibi. The Chief sent in his special unit to recover the laptop, which showed that Dean had sent e-mails from the car showroom at the time of Tina's abduction and also when Catherine was murdered, providing him with an alibi for both.; Killer's Calling Card: After murdering Tina Wells and leaving her body in a grain store on the farm, the killer left a knife through an animal heart along with Polaroids bearing the locations "The Dark Woods" and "The Old Docks", which the investigators failed to collect.: Team's Pick: Andrew; Location: The Dark Woods; Lead Investigator's Pick: Meryl, for tactical purposes, as Ruairi perceived Meryl to be the strongest investigator.; Location: The Old Docks; Eliminated: Meryl; Killer Clue: Andrew returned with a strip of four passport photos of Anya, Trevor and Catherine's daughter, leading the investigators to believe that Catherine had been planning to take Anya somewhere.
7	"Episode 7"
Lead Investigator: Nick: Team 1: Melanie and Ruairi; Day 1: Visit Jay Wilmington, ask him what he knows about Anya's paternity, and ask whether he has threatened Catherine.; Hidden Test: Do not reveal the source of the information.; Jay denied both being Anya's father and threatening Catherine, and asked the investigators who had told them he was involved. The investigators did not reveal that the information had come from Tina Wells and Trevor Dobie.: Day 2: Interview Felicity Wilmington about lying about the baby.; Hidden Test: Caution Felicity and take a statement.; Felicity informed the investigators that she had killed Dorothy's baby, thereby confessing to murder. The investigators questioned her further, asking whether the death was accidental and how she could be sure she was responsible. Felicity stated plainly that she knew she had killed the baby because she had allowed it to die, and then asked whether the investigators were going to arrest her. Melanie told her they were not, explaining that they were simply gathering information on Dorothy, Felicity, and the baby, and that Felicity was not in any trouble, before returning to HQ.: Result: Fail — the team did not caution Felicity.; Team 2: Andrew and Richard; Day 1: Visit George Hawick.; Hidden Test: Notice the significance of the date the photograph was taken.; While George was being questioned, a friend of his, Rodney "Rod" Lewis, stopped by to show off the back page of the daily paper, which featured a photo of Rod holding a large fish. When George asked when it was taken, Rod stated that it was exactly two weeks earlier. Richard realised this would have been the day of the murder and asked Rod how long he had borrowed George's boat for. Rod replied that he took the boat at approximately 6:00 am and returned with the fish at about midday. The investigators were then left stranded on the island by their driver and unable to walk back to the mainland, having been cut off by the tide. After waiting for the tide to go out, they made their way on foot over the causeway, at which point the killer fired a flare to draw attention to a taunting message left on a gate, containing the next Killer's Game locations.: Day 2: Visit the newspaper office.; Hidden Test: Spot the vital evidence in the original photograph.; The investigators discovered that the photo in the paper had been cropped from a larger image, which showed George Hawick in the background chopping wood. The time stamp revealed that the photo was taken at 12:04 pm, giving George an alibi for the murder of Catherine.: Result: Pass; Goldie's Kidnapping: On the afternoon of Day 1, Nick, the Lead Investigator, was sent a video of a kidnapped Goldie Prior reading a ransom note demanding the necklace in exchange for her release. Both teams worked together to make the exchange, with Melanie chosen by Nick as the negotiator. The bag containing the necklace was bugged by Team 2 so that it could be tracked; however, the investigators lost sight of the car and recovered only the empty bag from the area indicated by the tracker. Killer's Calling Card: As noted above, while stranded by the high tide at the end of their Day 1 inquiry, Andrew and Richard found Polaroids on a fence bearing a sign reading "Coming out to play", revealed when a flare was fired. The Polaroids showed the locations "The Quarry" and "The Derelict Barn".: Team's Pick: Ruairi (Melanie and Ruairi were tied); Note: The Lead Investigator was tasked with breaking the tie rather than asking the group to recast their votes. Nick chose Ruairi to play the Killer's Game, believing that Melanie had performed better over the previous two days.; Location: The Quarry; Lead Investigator's Pick: Richard, by (in the Lead Investigator's opinion) a process of elimination: Ruairi had already been picked, Andrew was given a "night off", and Melanie had been the successful negotiator during the kidnapping, leaving Richard as the remaining investigator to play the Killer's Game.; Location: The Derelict Barn; Eliminated: Ruairi; Killer Clue: Richard returned with a jeweller's drawing of the necklace, showing the original design of the jewel, including the large pendant at the bottom.
8	"Episode 8"
Lead Investigator: Andrew Note: With only four investigators remaining, the Lead Investigator had to join the others in the field and could be nominated by the group to face the Killer's Game.: Team 1: Melanie and Nick; Day 1: Visit Jennifer Wilmington and confront her with the evidence of Goldie's kidnapping found in the enhanced ransom note tape.; Hidden Test: Spot the date on the newspaper in the back room of Jennifer's shop.; The investigators asked Jennifer who had access to the shop and whether she had seen or heard anything of Jay and Goldie in recent days. Jennifer told them that Jay and Trevor had access to the shop and that she had not seen or heard from Jay or Goldie recently. She gave the investigators permission to access the store room, which they believed was the setting of the ransom video, but they failed to spot that day's newspaper on the table, which would have cast doubt on Jennifer's claim not to have entered the store room for several days. Melanie asked Nick whether it was a crime scene, and Nick incorrectly stated that it was not. The investigators did not confront Jennifer with the evidence that Goldie had been held in the store room.: Day 2: Set up surveillance at Jennifer's shop to observe Jennifer and Trevor. Follow up on Jennifer's alibi.; Hidden Test: Ask for confirmation of Jennifer's visit to the solicitor.; The investigators used surveillance to establish why Jennifer was scared of Trevor, but observed no behaviour from Trevor to justify her concern. They did hear Jennifer telling Trevor that she had told the investigators he had been in the store room recently, to which he questioned why she would say so when it was untrue. Jennifer retorted that she had thought he was in there, and added that she could have told them he was at the church on the day Catherine was murdered. Trevor confronted her, demanding to know why she was telling the investigators things about him and what her reasoning was. Jennifer told him she thought he should leave. Upon Trevor's exit, the investigators' surveillance van was shaken and banged from the outside. When they attempted to leave, they realised they were locked in. The killer had left a message on the van, along with Polaroids of the locations for the next Killer's Game. While trapped in the van, the investigators also saw Jay enter the shop, flustered and trying to reach the store room. Jennifer tried to hush him and usher him out before he could say or do anything, as she was aware the shop was under surveillance while Jay was not. She instructed him to meet her at the local pub, and Jay left. Jennifer then found the investigators in the van, and upon releasing them she confessed to the kidnapping and explained that it had all been about the necklace. She offered a potential alibi, saying she had been at her solicitor's at the time of the murder. When the investigators followed this up, the solicitor believed Jennifer had been there earlier than the time she had stated. However, on checking the visitor log, they found that the solicitor had misremembered: Jennifer had indeed been at the solicitor's at the time of the murder, providing her with an alibi.: Result: Fail — the team did not confront Jennifer and failed to spot the significance of the newspaper in the store room.; Team 2: Andrew (as Lead Investigator) and Richard; Day 1: Search the flooded grain store.; Hidden Test: Keep searching until they find the clue.; At the grain store where Tina's body had been found, the investigators were told it had been flooded with dirty water. They needed to search it systematically until they found the item the killer had supposedly hidden there. The clue was a shredded letter in a bag weighed down with a brick. Once reassembled, the letter was found to have been written by Charles Wilmington to his son Tony, and revealed the existence of the necklace. Charles gave Tony instructions on passing down the heirloom, telling him to pass it on to a child he trusted, and adding that he had never approved of Tony's choice of wife — implying that Jennifer was not to have it.: Day 2: Visit Tony Wilmington and ask about the Wilmington Jewel.; Hidden Test: Find out whether copies of Tony's taped conversation with Catherine exist.; Tony Wilmington had taped a conversation with Catherine four or five days before her death, in which he told her about the necklace and its history. He bequeathed it to her, but she felt it would be inappropriate, as it was a family heirloom better suited to Jay or Jennifer. When he began telling her about his relationship with her mother, Catherine revealed that she already knew he was her father, adding that no one else knew. Tony tried to give her the necklace again, but Catherine refused once more, telling him it would not be good for herself and Anya, because Trevor wanted Anya, being her father. Tony stated that Trevor would never have any claim on the necklace and that he would make a provision in his will to confirm it. He also told the investigators that he had given Catherine £20,000 to fund a fresh start away from Blackwater. Before the final briefing, Team 2 was sent back to Creeksea Place, where a fire had broken out. The fire ultimately killed Tony Wilmington, who died in the ambulance on the way to hospital. The investigators reached Tony as he was first rescued from his room and spotted a letter in his hand, which they recovered as potential evidence. The letter revealed that Jay had heard the contents of the tape before his wedding was due to take place — and that the person who had let him hear it was Catherine herself.: Result: Fail — the team did not ask whether copies of the tape existed, who had access to it, or whether anyone else knew about it.; Note: Anya was also interviewed by a family liaison officer and, when questioned, said that Goldie (her aunt) had left the house on the day of the murder. The investigators realised that Goldie had lied to them about her whereabouts when they first spoke to her and revealed that Catherine had died. Killer's Calling Card: As described above, the killer shook and banged on the surveillance van the investigators were using. Once they were able to get out, they found Polaroids for the next two locations: "The Boathouse" and "The Bottling Plant".: Team's Pick: Andrew; Location: The Boathouse; Lead Investigator's Pick: Richard, for (in the Lead Investigator's opinion) not asking relevant questions during Day 2's line of inquiry.; Location: The Bottling Plant; Eliminated: Richard; Killer Clue: Andrew returned with a picture of a sort code and account number from a joint account belonging to Gillian "Goldie" Prior and Jay Wilmington.
9	"Episode 9"
Lead Investigator: There was no Lead Investigator for the finale, and no hidden tests, passes or fails. Instead, the final three investigators (Andrew, Melanie, and Nick) worked together to interview the final three suspects (Goldie, Jay, and Trevor). === Final Three === : Day 1; During the morning briefing, the Chief and the final investigators discussed the clue Andrew had found at the last Killer's Game: two numbers, which Nick identified as a bank account number and sort code. The numbers were revealed to relate to a bank account shared by Goldie and Jay, showing a withdrawal of £50.00 on the morning of Catherine's murder. The investigators realised this might clear Goldie or Jay — or potentially implicate Trevor, if he had access to the account — but they would need CCTV to identify who made the withdrawal, as the PIN and card could have been used by anyone the account holders trusted. The Chief told the investigators that their first line of inquiry was to attend the reading of Tony Wilmington's last will and testament, and their second was to interview Jay and Goldie to establish who had withdrawn the money. The investigators attended the reading of Tony Wilmington's will at the solicitor's office, along with Goldie, Jay, Felicity, and Jennifer. Tony left Jennifer and Jay the entire estate, but via a video testament bequeathed the Wilmington necklace to Catherine. He stated that, in accordance with Catherine's wishes, Anya would inherit the necklace afterwards, but also that one person should under no circumstances lay claim to it: Trevor Dobie, Anya's biological father. Jay called Trevor a "bastard" and left hastily before the investigators had a chance to speak to him. As the rest of the family was leaving, Goldie asked to talk to the investigators at the café. At the café, she confessed what had happened on the morning of the murder. Jay had phoned her at approximately 11 am to ask for her help in getting the necklace back. He said he did not know why Catherine had the family heirloom, but he needed it back or the wedding could not go ahead; he had asked Catherine for it, and she had refused. At Jay's request, Goldie asked Catherine for the necklace under the guise that it could be her "something borrowed" for the wedding, but Catherine again refused, and when asked where she had got it, would say only that it would all come out later. While leaving the church after arguing with Catherine, Goldie overheard a telephone conversation between Catherine and Trevor; she could tell the two were arguing but not what about. She then said she saw Jay outside the church, but stopped only to tell him she had been unsuccessful and was not getting involved any further before driving off. Andrew then asked her about the joint bank account and the £50.00 withdrawal. Goldie stated that she had forgotten to buy a gift for Jennifer and had withdrawn £50 for flowers before going home. Nick asked who had instigated the kidnapping, and she stated it was Jay's idea; her reasoning for acting as an accomplice was that if Jay wanted the necklace, it meant he could not have killed Catherine, giving her hope that he was innocent. Goldie also explained that she had not revealed what actually happened on the morning of the murder when first questioned because she had not wanted to implicate Jay as the killer. The investigators were then alerted by Jennifer that she had seen Trevor moving out of the annexe at Creeksea Place. When they arrived, Trevor had already left, and Jennifer let them into the property. Investigating Trevor's living area, they found that one of the rooms had been boarded up. After pulling down the plasterboard covering, they discovered that the attic room had been prepared for Anya. Jennifer stated that she had never seen Anya visit the annexe, and Nick spotted letters addressed to Anya that had been marked "return to sender". The investigators went to Jay's barge to attempt an interview, having been unable to speak to him earlier when he rushed off from the solicitor's. Jay was not there, but they entered the boat to investigate the scene. Melanie noticed a new answerphone message; on playing it, they heard Goldie telling Jay that she had told the investigators everything, and Melanie took the tape as evidence. Andrew and Nick found a bulletin board covered in familiar Polaroids. The front bore pictures of Goldie, but on turning it around they found pictures of Catherine on the back, along with a card from her relating to Jay being Anya's godparent, dated April 1991. The investigators decided to bring the entire bulletin board back with them and returned to HQ. Back at HQ, the investigators found the power cut and evidence that the killer had broken in. There were messages stencilled on the windows, a hanged Barbie doll, and two pictures showing the locations for the next Killer's Game. The power was restored and, after a phone call from Nick, the Chief arrived early for the evening briefing. The killer still demanded two investigators to play the Killer's Game; instead of a group vote, the Chief sent out the two investigators who had failed the most lines of inquiry over the entire investigation. Killer's Calling Card: After ransacking HQ and leaving "coming out to play" messages throughout, the killer left the mess as the penultimate message, along with the locations "Operational Zone" and "Living Quarters", both within the same nuclear bunker.: Player 1: Andrew – 6 failed lines of inquiry; Location: Nuclear Bunker – Operational Zone; Player 2: Nick – 5 failed lines of inquiry; Location: Nuclear Bunker – Living Quarters; Eliminated: Nick; Killer Clue: Andrew returned with Polaroids which, when placed in the right order, read: "Who am I? If you are right you live. If you are wrong you die."; Note: Melanie failed only four lines of inquiry, allowing her to progress to the final stage automatically. === Final Two === : Day 2; At the morning briefing, the Chief revealed that the bank had sent CCTV footage from the cash point showing Goldie making the withdrawal. This confirmed her story about withdrawing £50.00, and she was cleared. The Chief informed the two remaining investigators that he had reviewed all the evidence put before them and deduced the killer's identity. The investigators were given one hour to do the same before naming to the Chief who they believed the killer to be and why. They were reminded that they were now in direct competition for the prize money — although if both guessed correctly they would share the £25,000, while if both were wrong, neither would receive anything. They separately informed the Chief of their chosen suspect and their reasoning.: Andrew's Suspect: Trevor Dobie; Andrew's Reasoning: Trevor killed Catherine to secure custody of his daughter, Anya. He took the necklace on impulse after spotting that Catherine was wearing it, intending to use the pendant to fund leaving with Anya — hence his need for the passport photos of her. Removing himself and Anya from Blackwater would keep Anya away from the Wilmingtons; Trevor knew that Catherine was half Wilmington, meaning Anya was also related to a family he deeply hated for their treatment of his mother while she was their maid.; Melanie's Suspect: Jay Wilmington; Melanie's Reasoning: Jay killed Catherine as an emotional response to discovering that the relationship he had been having was actually with his sister, costing him all of his family and friends. Much of the evidence pointed towards Jay: the chart dividers used as the murder weapon were accessible to Jay but not to Trevor; Jay wrote the ransom note, which included the same phrase the killer used to taunt the investigators; and the Polaroids on Jay's boat were the same type used by the killer. Melanie also argued that Trevor Dobie was not clever enough to commit a crime like this, whereas Jay Wilmington was.; The Chief then sent the investigators out to trail their chosen suspects. Andrew chased Trevor down a river as he tried to escape by boat from the yacht club, while Melanie pursued Jay across fields as he attempted to flee on a dirt bike through the disused airfield. Both lost their suspects at closed gates and had to wait for news of new sightings. Melanie learned that Jay's dirt bike had been spotted outside a remote grain store, while Andrew received word that Trevor's pickup truck had been located at a construction warehouse 30 km from Blackwater. As both headed to their locations, the killer left each of them a message — "Coming out to play one last time?" — inviting them to one final Killer's Game.: Andrew: Suspects Trevor Dobie; Location: Construction Warehouse; Melanie: Suspects Jay Wilmington; Location: Grain Store; Eliminated: Melanie; Jay Wilmington was cleared. He had an alibi from the eyewitness Edward, who had been forced to use a different phone box because the one he intended to use was occupied by a man in a brown checked shirt — the same shirt Jay was wearing when he went to the morgue with Goldie and told the investigators he had not changed his clothes in over twenty-four hours. Jay had gone to the phone box to call Trevor and tell him to stop hassling Catherine; the killer's own video captured the sound of a phone ringing once before being rejected. This was the call Jay made from the phone box moments before Catherine was killed by Trevor.

== Production ==
The town of Maldon, Essex was used as the setting for the fictional town of Blackwater, named after the river on which Maldon sits. The Kelvedon Hatch Secret Nuclear Bunker was also used in the series: Andrew Weaver and Nick Sykes went to its Operational Zone and Living Quarters respectively during the penultimate Killer's Game. Before the game began, the investigators were sent on a training course at the Police Training Centre in Wakefield.

Andrew Weaver won the game despite being sent to play the Killer's Game six times, excluding the final Killer's Game against runner-up Melanie "Mel" Sainz. He holds the record for the most times a contestant has been sent to play the Killer's Game, breaking Kristen Kirchner's record of five in the American version, Murder in Small Town X. Andrew was also the only investigator to fail a line of inquiry while serving as Lead Investigator, and he received the most votes against him of any contestant over the season, with ten. He correctly identified builder Trevor Dobie as the killer, whereas Melanie chose groom Jay Wilmington. Andrew was sent to the yacht club, where Trevor was last seen, and was "invited" to the final Killer's Game at the construction warehouse, where he found Bob Taylor waiting to proclaim him the winner of the £25,000 grand prize.

== Viewer interaction ==
Using Sky, cable or Freeview, viewers could access additional content through BBCi's digital interactive features. One feature, Blackwater TV, reviewed the case and presented mock television news reports. The React feature allowed viewers to vote for who they believed the killer to be, with the results shown the following week. The Investigators section featured exclusive footage of the Chief commenting on the contestants' handling of the case. The fourth feature, the Case File, held all the details of the case uncovered so far, including timelines, locations, suspects' relationships, and evidence.
