= Utopia (2014 American TV series) =

- Genre: Reality
- Created by: John de Mol Jr.
- Presented by: Dan Piraro
- Opening theme: "Utopia" by Daughtry
- Country of origin: United States
- Original language: English
- No. of seasons: 1
- No. of episodes: 12

Production
- Executive producers: John de Mol; Conrad Green; Jon Kroll; David Tibballs
- Production company: Talpa Media

Original release
- Network: Fox
- Release: September 7 – October 31, 2014

Utopia is a reality series that premiered on Fox on September 7, 2014. Based on the original Dutch series of the same name and created by John de Mol Jr., the series follows a group of people who attempt to maintain a society in a remote area. Conrad Green was its executive producer. Originally scheduled for two nights per week, Tuesday and Friday, on October 2, 2014, Fox announced that Utopia was pulled from Tuesday nights, and would air only on Friday nights. On November 2, 2014, the show was cancelled after airing weeks of what was promoted as a year-long project. It is estimated that Fox paid $50 million to develop the show.

== Premise ==
The series follows a cast of 15 men and women who were placed in isolation and filmed twenty-four hours a day for a planned one year. The cast was to create their own society and figure out how to survive. The series was initially shown twice a week, with online streaming 24/7 with 129 hidden and unhidden cameras all over the Utopia compound. The live streams began on August 29, 2014, the day when the 15 pioneers entered Utopia. Over 5,000 people auditioned for the series. Every month, three pioneers were nominated for elimination—to be sent back to their everyday lives. The live-streamers were able to decide which new pioneers got their chance to join the cast.

== Cast ==
This is the cast of the show at the time of its cancellation:

Name	Age on entry	Occupation	Residence	Started
Aaron Thomas	26	Chef	Oxford, Mississippi	August 20
Amanda Scott	30	Behavior specialist	Seattle, Washington	August 20
Bella Chartrand	45	Real estate entrepreneur	Griffin, Georgia	August 20
Cal Swangash	39	Farmer	Portland, Oregon	October 1
Chris Tuorto	25	Chili farmer	Cary, North Carolina	August 20
Dedeker Winston	26	Belly dancer	Los Angeles, California	August 20
Ernesto Santana	39	Contractor	Oceanside, California	September 21
Hex Vanisles	25	Unemployed	Detroit, Michigan	August 20
Josh Johnston	36	General contractor	Salt Lake City, Utah	August 20
Kristen Vanstrom	24	Entrepreneur	Jamestown, New York	September 4
Nikki Noce	29	Holistic doctor	Brooklyn, New York	August 20
Taylor Vaughn	24	Construction Worker	Omaha, Nebraska	September 11

On September 2, 2014, contestant Hex Vanisles was medically evacuated while filming for the premiere, but returned to the show a few hours later.

=== Past Utopians ===
Source for list:

Name	Age on entry	Occupation	Residence	Status	Started	To
Andrea Cox	38	Chef	San Diego, California	Non-starter	n/a	n/a
Dave Green	31	Unemployed	Queens, New York	Left Utopia	August 20	September 5
Jonathan Lovelace	44	Pastor	Church Hill, Tennessee	Left - Injury	August 20	September 10
Red Vanwinkle	42	Handyman	Cecilia, Kentucky	Banished	August 20	September 30
Rhonda Deniston	48	Entrepreneur/Political Activist	Oceanside, California	Rejected Candidate	September 4	September 9
Katie Cercone	29	Animal Rescuer	Sacramento, California	Rejected Candidate	October 1	October 6
Bri Nguyen	20	Veterinary assistant	Westminster, California	Left Utopia	August 20	October 25
Mike Quinn	33	Attorney	Manhattan, New York	Left - Family Emergency	August 20	October 26
Rob Hospidor	38	Security programmer	South Amboy, New Jersey	Banished	August 20	October 31

== Episodes ==
No.	Title	Original release date	U.S. viewers (millions)
1	"Series Premiere, Part 1"	September 7, 2014	4.63
2	"Series Premiere, Part 2"	September 9, 2014	2.48
3	"Series Premiere, Part 3"	September 12, 2014	1.99
4	"Week 2 in Utopia – A"	September 16, 2014	2.42
5	"Week 2 in Utopia – B"	September 19, 2014	1.52
6	"Week 3 in Utopia – A"	September 23, 2014	1.91
7	"Week 3 in Utopia – B"	September 26, 2014	1.87
8	"Week 4 in Utopia – A"	September 30, 2014	1.99
9	"Week 4 in Utopia – B"	October 3, 2014	1.75
10	"Week 5 in Utopia"	October 10, 2014	1.86
11	"Week 6 in Utopia"	October 17, 2014	1.77
12	"Week 7 & 8 in Utopia"	October 31, 2014	1.54

== Reception ==
Though Utopia's premiere was met with general optimism, the show has ultimately been almost universally panned by critics and viewers alike.

According to review aggregator Metacritic, which assigns a weighted average score out of 100 to reviews from mainstream critics, Utopia received an average score of 38% based on 4 reviews, indicating "generally unfavorable" reviews. Utopia holds a Rotten Tomatoes score of 33% based on reviews from 6 critics, and a rating average of 4.5 out of 10, with the consensus being "Utopia squanders a lofty premise and quickly devolves into a hellish slog that barters in the most irksome reality television tropes."

Rob Owen of the Pittsburgh Post-Gazette sardonically dubbed the show "Fox's Folly" and wrote that it "really ought to be called "Farming, Fighting, and Fornicating – But Mostly Fighting." Reviewing the episode "Season Premiere – Part 2", which aired on September 9, 2014, Owen stated: "Tuesday's episode, which saw a 43 percent ratings decline according to The Programming Insider, featured still more fighting – a failure to order Ramen noodles threatened to become Utopia's assassination-of-Archduke Ferdinand moment – and hints at fornicating between two settlers in a barn loft. Fox executives could have saved substantial production costs and achieved basically the same boring result by filming 14 randy monkeys in a cage containing only 10 bananas."

Brian Lowry of Variety criticized the show's choice of cast: "If 'Utopia' has any legs at all, it will as a cable-style freakshow, not some grand “experiment” in democracy. Indeed, the diverse lineup seems designed to draw from various unscripted staples – a dash of Doomsday Preppers here, a dollop of Duck Dynasty there – and throw them together in the same blender."

Willa Paskin of Slate disparaged Utopia's attempts to condemn the "misbehavior" it "desperately [requires]" from its participants: "Utopia ... strives to frame its mission in a positive light, distancing itself ... from the on-camera misbehavior its producers so desperately require. Through the first two episodes, five of the eight men assembled have violent physical outbursts. The female cast members avoid the trap of being portrayed as catty and vicious; as a result, they are granted no personalities at all, just a penchant for swimming naked ... the first night [ends] with one case of alcohol poisoning, another of threatening sexual behavior, and two fights, Piraro sadly opines that so far the group is failing miserably at utopia, as if the producers had been hoping for a dull, conflict-free Eden."

== See also ==
- Eden, a 2016 British TV series
