= Segue o Jogo =

Brazilian football news program broadcast by TV Globo

- Genre: Sports news
- Directed by: Renato Ribeiro
- Presented by: Lucas Gutierrez; Paulo Nunes
- Opening theme: Instrumental
- Country of origin: Brazil
- Original language: Brazilian Portuguese

Production
- News editors: Sidney Garambone (editor-in-chief); Dani Martins (executive editor); Daniel Botelho; Matheus Garrocho; Matheus Guaresi; Rafael Noronha
- Running time: 15 minutes

Original release
- Network: TV Globo
- Release: February 13, 2019 – present

Related
- Bora pro Jogo

Segue o Jogo is a Brazilian sports news program produced by TV Globo and has been airing since February 13, 2019, on Wednesday evenings following the network's soccer broadcasts. It is currently hosted by journalist Lucas Gutierrez, with commentary by former soccer player Paulo Nunes.

== History ==
The show premiered on TV Globo on February 13, 2019, following the broadcast of the matches between São Paulo FC and Talleres in the Libertadores, and CR Vasco da Gama and Resende FC in the Carioca State Championship. The premiere episode was hosted by Gustavo Villani with commentary by Roger Flores. Throughout the season, Caio Ribeiro and Ana Thaís Matos also appeared as commentators.

For the 2020 season, Globo changed the show's host, with Lucas Gutierrez taking the helm and Paulo Nunes providing commentary. Due to the impacts of the COVID-19 pandemic, the program was off the air for a while, returning only on August 12, 2020, in compliance with all health and safety protocols related to COVID-19.

On June 20, 2021, it was aired as a special episode following the soccer games broadcast that Sunday, taking up part of the time slot that had belonged to Domingão do Faustão, hosted by Fausto Silva, which had been canceled.

== Personnel ==
=== Current ===
- Lucas Gutierrez (2020–present)
- Paulo Nunes (2020–present)
- Tiago Medeiros (2025–present; eventually)

=== Former ===
- Ana Thaís Matos (2019–2020)
- Caio Ribeiro (2019–2020)
- Gustavo Villani (2019–2020)
- Roger Flores (2019–2020)
