= Hipertensão =

- Created by: Endemol
- Starring: Zeca Camargo (Season 1); Glenda Kozlowski (Season 2–3)
- Country of origin: Brazil
- Original language: Portuguese
- No. of seasons: 3

Production
- Running time: 60 minutes

Original release
- Network: Rede Globo
- Release: April 14, 2002 – October 27, 2011

Hipertensão is the Brazilian version of Fear Factor, which premiered April 14, 2002 on the Rede Globo television network.

The original Dutch version was called Now or Neverland. The show pits contestants against each other to complete a series of stunts better and/or quicker than all the other contestants, by doing this in the fastest time, for a grand prize.

The show was hosted by journalist Zeca Camargo in season 1 and was hosted by Glenda Kozlowski in seasons 2 and 3.

== Show Format ==
=== Season 1: Hipertensão ===
The season 1 format involved three men and three women, who had to complete three professional stunts to win R$50,000. If a contestant was too scared to attempt a stunt, failed to complete a stunt, or (in some cases) had the worst performance on a stunt, it was eliminated from the competition.

=== Season 2: Hipertensão X ===
The season 2 format was similar to Fear Factor Extreme (FFX) instead of the original "three-stunt, one winner per episode" format used in the first season. Season 2 was consists of multiple sets of stunts and a set number of contestants over a period of weeks.

=== Season 3: Hipertensão 2011 ===
It keeps the format of the second season. The third season of Hipertensão debuted in September 2011.

== Stunts ==
The order of the stunts on a typical episode of Hipertensão is as follows:

=== Stunt 1 ===
The first stunt was designed to physically test each of the contestants. Usually, the two men and the two women, or the three teams, that gave the best performance would move on to the second stunt.

=== Stunt 2 ===
The second stunt was meant to mentally challenge the contestants. The three most common types of stunts in the second round were eating stunts, animal stunts, and retrieval stunts. Eating stunts entailed ingesting vile animal parts, live bugs, or a blended concoction of multiple gross items; animal stunts entailed immersing one's head or entire body in animals considered to be disgusting or intimidating (such as rats, snakes, or worms).

=== Stunt 3 ===
The third and final stunt was usually something from an extreme type of stunt seen in an action film. Like the first stunt, it usually involved heights, water, vehicles, or some combination of the three. In order to avoid ties, this stunt was always competitive. The player with the best performance this round would win the grand prize (R$50,000 in season 1).

== Celebrity Special ==
A special spin-off called Hipertensão: Celebrity Special aired a week after the season finale on Sunday, May 12, 2002 at 11:00PM.

This episode featured six celebrity contestants competing for charity. The winner would receive R$50,000 for their charity. In the end, volleyball player Tande came out as the winner.

=== The Celebrities ===
(ages stated at time of contest)

Name	Age	Occupation
Carolina Dieckmann	23	Actress
Luciano Huck	30	TV Host
Janeth Arcain	33	Basketball Player
Marcos Pasquim	32	Actor
Tande	32	Volleyball Player
Xaiane Dantas	27	Big Brother 1 Housemate

In Stunt 1, the contestants were hung at 100 feet in the air. and had to hit a moving target. In Stunt 2, the contestants had to separate with your hands as many belly white snakes, lying in a magazine with 10,000 worms in their legs and 5000 cockroaches in their heads. In Stunt 3, underwater, the contestants would have to leave as soon as possible in a padlocked cage, then swim to a buoy.
