= Conrad Green =

Television producer

Conrad Green is a television producer. He is noted for his successful work on reality television shows.

He has been producer or executive producer for such shows as Dancing with the Stars, Big Brother, Uncovered, Red Handed, The Pride of Britain Awards and Popstars. In 2001, after his success with launching Big Brother UK and Popstars, he was hired as BBC's head of New Entertainment Development. A year later he was hired by 19TV, the company that produced Pop Idol and moved to the United States.

After working on shows for multiple American networks, he went on to show-run Dancing with the Stars from its inception to season 18. Following this, he show-ran Utopia, You the Jury and Crime Scene Kitchen as well serving as executive producer on My Kitchen Rules for Fox, and was show runner of The Gong Show's revival on ABC and Go-Big Show on TBS.

As of 2021, he currently resides in Los Angeles, working as executive producer on numerous projects for broadcast networks. He has won BAFTA, RTS, Broadcast and Montreux TV Festival Awards for his work in the U.K. and been nominated for multiple Producers Guild and eight Emmy Awards for his work in the US. He has won People's Choice, GLAAD, and NAACP Image Awards, amongst others, in the US.

== Filmography ==
- Big Brother (2000) – producer
- Popstars (2001) – producer
- The Murder Game (2003) – executive producer
- Dancing with the Stars (2005–2014, 2022–present) – producer
- Utopia (2014) – executive producer
- My Kitchen Rules (2017) – executive producer
- The Gong Show (2017) – executive producer
- You the Jury (2017) – executive producer
- Ultimate Tag (2020) – executive producer
