= O Jogo (TV series) =

Brazilian reality TV show

- Genre: Reality show
- Created by: George Verschoor, Robert Fisher, Jr., and Gordon Cassidy (for FOX)
- Directed by: Carlos Magalhães (general); J.B. de Oliveira (núcleo)
- Presented by: Zeca Camargo
- No. of seasons: 1
- No. of episodes: 10

Original release
- Network: Rede Globo

O Jogo (English: The Game) was a Brazilian reality show Broadcast on Rede Globo between May 27 and July 29, 2003, on Tuesday nights.

It was a Brazilian version of the FOX Television show, Murder in Small Town X, and was presented by Zeca Camargo.

== Premise ==
The program's starting point was the murder of the businessman Wagner Klein, director of the Paes Brasil School, in the fictional Village of Santo Antônio. A candidate for mayor of the city, Wagner was married to the Biology teacher Priscila Klein, a woman unhappy in her marriage, and had a son, Maurício Klein, a mysterious young man who lived off his father's businesses despite maintaining a relationship of appearances with the family. After his mysterious murder, it was discovered that the director was also a man with many enemies — with at least 12 suspects who could have committed the crime.

The murder, committed on the Klein family's boat, was recorded by the killer himself who, without revealing his identity, proposed a game, describing 12 suspects — including himself among them — and asking the audience: "Which one of them am I?" To unravel the mystery, 12 investigators entered the scene, each receiving distinct missions. They were divided into groups to carry out the tasks and analyze the clues. Everything was discussed and evaluated collectively. In each episode, the entire group, through the evaluation of clues and alibis, gathered concrete evidence and cleared one of the suspects. One suspect and one participant/investigator were eliminated. To gather the evidence, the investigators went out on investigative missions.

At the beginning of each episode, one investigator would be appointed as the Lead Investigator, who would have specific responsibilities and powers. The investigators would be split into teams by the Lead Investigator, and sent down different "leads". During the investigation, the team would be given a task by the killer to take out one of the innocent suspects for a chance to accumulate R$25,000 for every time they get the correct suspect for the day. Failing to do the task or giving the wrong answer would mean the money wasn't added to the total pot. A maximum potential was R$250,000 (Adjusted for 2020's value, R$652,764) for clearing all ten suspects correctly. However, the team got two suspects wrong meaning the final pot was left at R$200,000 for solving the case.

At some point during the investigation days in each episode the killer would leave some form of message, consisting of maps with the two locations attached. Signaling the start of each episodes elimination, The "Final Investigation". Every investigator except the lead investigator could vote and the investigator with the most votes would be chosen as the first person to conduct the "Final Investigation". The Lead Investigator would then choose any investigator to be the second person for the "Final Investigation". The two chosen investigators pick from two envelopes to decide who will go to either of the two locations given.

In the "Final Investigation"., the two selected investigators would be sent to two different remote locations completely alone, with their movements recorded only by a head-mounted camera and a flashlight, and they also had to follow a map to where the "clue" would be located. One of the chosen investigators would discover an important clue that would help solve the mystery, whereas the other investigator would be eliminated from the show as "murdered by the killer".

The eliminated contestant would choose the Lead Investigator for the next episode, by means of a prerecorded "last will and testament".

== The Investigators ==
The following list are the contestants that took part in the show, in the order of Elimination.

Investigator	Job	Eliminated	Final Killer's Game Location
Tatiana	Columnist	12th Place	Unknown
Marcelo	Scientist	11th Place	Unknown
Fernanda	Business Student	10th Place	Unknown
Sidney	Administrator	9th Place	Unknown
Rebeca	Interior Design Student	8th Place	Unknown
Marco	Street Artist / Circus Musician	7th Place	Unknown
Henrique	Architect	6th Place	Unknown
Antônio	Writer	5th Place	Unknown
Joana	Film Student / Director	4th Place	Unknown
Priscila	Beauty Salon Owner	3rd Place	Unknown
Breno	Student / Lawyer	Runner Up	Unknown
Elaine	Former Advertising Agent	Winner	The Chapel

== The Suspects ==
The Following list are the suspects that the investigators had to figure out who the murder was.

Suspect	Job	Outcome	Notes
Petrônio Lavínio (Pepê)	Village Hermit	Unknown	
Telma Werner	Newspaper Journalist	Unknown	
Otto Ventura	Psychiatrist	Unknown	
Belisa Hoffman	Village Mayor	Unknown	
Lúcio	Fisherman	Unknown	
Cida	The Village Mystic	Unknown	
Alice Erthal	Ex Wife to Mauríco	Unknown	
Silvério Santarém (Bróder)	Bar Owner	Unknown	
Rodolfo Muller	Rival Businessman	Unknown	
Oscar Acioly	Chief of Police	Cleared	
Tadeu Reigel	Village Dentist	11th Cleared	
Maria Ritinha	Social Worker	The Murderer	

== Winning Moment ==
In the final event of the show, Breno and Elaine were the last two investigators remaining. Breno, who was the lead investigator, chose Tadeu as the killer, while Elaine picked Maria. In the end both went off to their respective locations, and in the end the killer was revealed to be Maria.

Her motive to murder was as follows; Maria had an affair with Wagner Klein, and when her father found out about it, he committed suicide. As part of a confession in her final location at the chapel, she had been planning for the right time to not only murder the Klein family but also anyone from a Satanic sect who didn't agree to follow on her plans. Among the plans she had was to kidnap and kill Maurício Klein and Alice Erthal's son João Pedro. However the cops got to Maria and J escaped. But when cornered, Maria ended up committing suicide. Elaine was then awarded the cash prize of R$200,000 Reais. (Adjusted to 2020's value is R$522,211)
