= Times Brasil =

Brazilian news-based pay television

- Country: Brazil
- Broadcast area: Brazil
- Headquarters: Berrini One Building; Av. Engenheiro Luís Carlos Berrini, Itaim Bibi, São Paulo (SP)

Programming
- Language: Portuguese
- Picture format: 1080i 16:9 HDTV

Ownership
- Owner: Times Brasil (85%); Attention Economics (15%); Versant (content licensing CNBC)
- Key people: Douglas Tavolaro (CEO); Rafael Gomide (COO)

History
- Launched: November 17, 2024; 22 months ago

Links
- Website: timesbrasil.com.br

Times Brasil, identified on-air as Times Brasil, CNBC exclusive licensee is a Brazilian news-based Free-to-air and news website, launched on 17 November 2024. With content licensing of CNBC The first at south America, being headquartered in São Paulo.

== Background ==
After successful foray of CNN news group in Brazil, with CNN Brazil launched in 2020, more media groups become interested in news segment in the country. CNBC announced that is looking for expanding their news channel in Brazil in 2023. They got into an agreement with Times Brasil and Attention Economics, and launched it in November 2024.

== Format ==
Programs are aired 24 hours daily with 15 hours live via digital terrestrial TV networks, pay TV providers and live streaming services in Brazil. The channel is owned by the Brazilian entrepreneur Douglas Tavolaro through Times Brasil in partnership with Attention Economics of the United Kingdom, in collaboration with Comcast's NBCUniversal (now Versant). Tavolaro is also founder of CNN Brazil, the main rival channel of CNBC in the country.

The editorial line and programming of CNBC Brazil are also focusing on political and daily life news, in addition to bringing specific programs such as the Brazilian versions of Shark Tank and The Apprentice, in a different approach from the business only programming of the original American channel.

== CNBC Brazil Staff ==
Announced as of October 24, 2024:

Anchors

- Christiane Pelajo
- Eric Klein
- Fabio Turci
- Marcelo Favalli
- Marcelo Torres
- Paula Monteiro
- Renan de Souza

Presenters

- Camila Farani
- Carol Barcelos
- Gustavo Sarti
- Marcos Buaiz
- Natália Ariede
- Rita Wu
- Zeca Camargo
