= Por Você =

Brazilian telenovela

- Genre: Telenovela
- Created by: Dino Cantelli; Juliana Peres
- Written by: Fausto Galvão; Cleissa Regina Martins; Michel Carvalho; Natália Sambrini; Mário Viana
- Directed by: André Câmara; Jeferson De
- Starring: Sheron Menezzes; Thiago Lacerda; Alinne Moraes; Ângelo Antônio; Amaury Lorenzo; Giovanna Grigio; Antônio Pitanga; Renata Sorrah
- Theme music composer: Frejat; Maurício Barros; Mauro Santa Cecília
- Opening theme: "Por Você" by Larissa Luz ft. Melly
- Country of origin: Brazil
- Original language: Portuguese

Production
- Production company: Estúdios Globo

Original release
- Network: TV Globo
- Release: 17 August 2026 – present

Por Você is a Brazilian telenovela created by Dino Cantelli and Juliana Peres. It premiered on TV Globo on 17 August 2026. The telenovela stars Sheron Menezzes, Thiago Lacerda, Alinne Moraes, Ângelo Antônio, Amaury Lorenzo, Giovanna Grigio, Antônio Pitanga and Renata Sorrah.

== Plot ==
Best friends since childhood, Bela and Juli grew up together as neighbors in Vila Maravilha, a fictional community nestled in the southern zone of Rio de Janeiro, but their lives took different paths when Bela broke through social barriers and graduated as a doctor, leaving behind a youthful romance with Gabriel to complete a residency in London. She returns to Brazil as a specialist in gynecology and obstetrics, focused on her professional life and with no time for personal relationships, unlike Juli, who has become a devoted and loving mother of four children: Peixe, Glorinha, Ítalo, and Samuca, and cares for them with great dedication following her husband's absence. A tragedy changes everyone's course forever when Bela and Juli are involved in a car accident, and Juli, on the brink of death, makes Bela promise that she will take care of her four children. Bela, who had no intention of becoming a mother, now has to deal with the typical conflicts of her adopted children's respective age groups and the grief over the loss of their biological mother.

In addition to facing this challenge, Bela struggles with her own issues at Luz Hospital and Maternity Center, her workplace, where she has a rivalry with Vanessa. The animosity between the two dates back to their childhood: Vanessa is the bosses' daughter, while Bela is the daughter of the family's housekeeper. To make matters worse, Vanessa is currently married to Gabriel, Bela's former love interest. Together, they have a daughter, the spoiled Leandra. Gabriel and Bela's past relationship is reignited with the arrival of a new love interest in her life: Lucas, the academic director of the school her children attend.

== Cast ==
- Sheron Menezzes as Isabela "Bela"Miranda
- Alinne Moraes as Vanessa Romano
- Thiago Lacerda as Gabriel Jordão
- Amaury Lorenzo as Lucas Sampaio
- Regiane Alves as Margô Monteiro
- Renata Sorrah as Pérola Romano
- Reginaldo Faria as Manoel Pader
- Humberto Morais as Aroldo Ferreira
- Cauê Campos as Pedro dos Santos Ferreira "Peixe"
- Milhem Cortaz as Juarez Lamarca
- Noêmia Oliveira as Iara Lamarca
- Giovanna Grigio as Leandra Romano Jordão
- Lucas Leto as Vitor Passarelli
- Rodrigo Lelis as Hamilton Matioli "Toy"
- José de Abreu as Próspero Matiolli
- Antônio Pitanga as Clemente Portela
- Mauricio Mattar as Gilberto Junqueira
- Ângelo Antônio as Zé Vitório
- Diogo Almeida as Sensei Otto
- Fernanda de Freitas as Silvia Prudente
- Paulo Vilhena as Ricardo Mendes
- Ana Rosa as Iracema dos Anjos
- Adanilo as Nataniel Araújo "Sabugo"
- Igor Jansen as Maike
- Bia Santana as Suellen "Su" Oliveira
- Lívia Silva as Dalila Cristina Araújo
- Laura Luz as Glória "Glorinha" dos Santos Ferreira
- Fabrício Assis as Ítalo dos Santos Ferreira
- Pietra Quintela as Hanna Prudente
- Henrique Camargo as Juca
- Pedro Guilherme as Dudu
- Miwa Yanagizawa as Vera
- Larissa Murai as Giovana
- Babu Santana as Vitinho
- Domithila Cattete as Lia
- Ariane Souza as Nelma Oliveira
- Daniela Fontan as Kátia
- Duda Matte as Chica
- Gustavo Arthidoro as Guto
- Luciana Guimarães as Dalva
- Kadu Spinola as Samuel "Samuca" dos Santos Ferreira
- Laura Chuff as Maria Antônia Araujo "Tom-Tom"

== Production ==
Por Você marks the debut of Dino Cantelli and Juliana Peres as lead writers, as both previously worked as collaborators and were part of TV Globo's Oficina de Autores (Authors' Workshop) project, which aims to prepare new talent for prime-time telenovela slots. Filming of the telenovela began on 11 May 2026.

Originally scheduled to premiere on 31 August 2026, the telenovela's premiere was moved up to the 10th due to its production being ahead of schedule, in addition to having a good part of the episodes already filmed. In addition, the poor reception of Coração Acelerado ended up weighing on the decision. However, it was eventually postponed to the 17th of the same month so that the delayed episodes from its predecessor could be aired, since its broadcast had been pre-empted due to the 2026 FIFA World Cup, forcing its run to be extended.

== Ratings ==
Season	Episodes	First aired		Last aired		Avg. viewers (points)
Season	Episodes	Date	Viewers (points)	Date	Viewers (points)	Avg. viewers (points)
1	TBA	17 August 2026	20.9	TBA	TBD	TBD
