= Zeca Camargo =

Brazilian journalist and writer

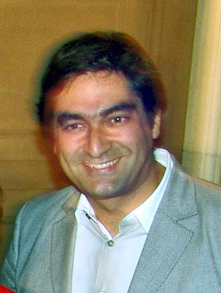
- Zeca Camargo in 2006
- Born: José Carlos Brito de Ávila Camargo; 8 April 1963 (age 63); Uberaba, Minas Gerais, Brazil
- Occupations: Presenter; Journalist; Writer
- Years active: 1987–present
- Known for: Fantástico; Elza
- Relatives: Cacaso (uncle)

José Carlos Brito de Ávila Camargo (8 April 1963), better known as Zeca Camargo, is a Brazilian television presenter, journalist and writer. He has a column in the Folha de S. Paulo newspaper.

== Biography ==
=== Early years and education ===
Zeca Camargo was born in the city of Uberaba, in the interior of the state of Minas Gerais. The son of doctor Faul Camargo and artisan Maria Inez, during his early childhood he lived in the city of Rio de Janeiro and in the cities of Araçatuba and Barretos, both in the interior of the state of São Paulo, until he moved to the capital as a teenager. He's the nephew of the poet Cacaso, member of poesia marginal.

He graduated in Business Administration from the Fundação Getulio Vargas (FGV) and in Advertising from the Escola Superior de Propaganda e Marketing (ESPM). Although he graduated, he never practiced his profession and began his career as a dance teacher, having had Marisa Orth, Giulia Gam and Ruth Cardoso as students.

=== Career ===
He began his career in journalism in 1987, working for the São Paulo newspaper Folha de S. Paulo. After working on a few editorials at the newspaper, he became the paper's correspondent in New York for a year. When he returned to Brazil, he began working as editor-in-chief of journalism of MTV and helped implement it. He worked as a VJ presenting MTV no Ar, a program with reports and interviews about the musical universe.

After four years he left the music station and moved to TV Cultura, where he presented the program Fanzine, as well as becoming a columnist for the teen magazine Capricho published by Editora Abril. He stayed between Capricho and Folha de S. Paulo until 1996.

In July 1996, Luiz Nascimento was invited to be a reporter for TV Globo's Fantástico program. In the program he did the series of reports "Aqui se Fala Português", and "A Fantástica Volta ao Mundo", the first series of reports to be generated entirely on the internet and not by satellite in the country. In 2000, he hosted the program No Limite, the Brazilian version of Survivor. He presented three seasons of the reality show, leaving the program after the last season in 2001. He also presented the first season of the reality show Hipertensão.

In 2008, he became a permanent presenter of the Fantástico program. Between 2006 and 2017 he kept a blog on G1, Rede Globo's online portal. In 2011, she took part in the show Medida Certa on Fantástico, which consisted of a reality weight loss show. Alongside presenter Renata Ceribelli, she promoted a change in lifestyle. By the end of the season, she had lost 5 kilos. He continued to present the program until 2013.

Invited by director Ricardo Waddington, he became a presenter on the variety program Vídeo Show. The program underwent changes in format, which did not please the public. The Video Show already had ratings problems before Zeca joined the show. In April 2015, he was replaced by actress Monica Iozzi.

In 2015, he debuted as one of the presenters of É de Casa, a Saturday morning variety show, alongside fellow presenters Cissa Guimarães, Tiago Leifert, Patrícia Poeta, André Marques and Ana Furtado. In May 2020, after 24 years working at TV Globo, he left the station.

On 3 July 2020, he was hired by TV Band in a bid to do double duty: as a presenter and also as the executive production director of his new station. He has presented a number of programs on the station, such as Band Folia, Zeca pelo Brasil and 1001 perguntas. Alongside Glenda Kozlowski, he presented the auditorium program Melhor da Noite. In July 2024, he left the station and gave up presenting Melhor da Noite.

In October 2024, he was hired by Times Brasil, a Brazilian broadcaster that is part of the CNBC network. At the broadcaster he hosts the travel program Passaporte.

==== Comment on Cristiano Araújo ====
In 2015, during the national commotion over the death of country singer Cristiano Araújo, Zeca made a chronicle; the comment was made on the evening of 28 June 2015, four days after the accident, during Jornal das Dez for GloboNews. Zeca said that "from one hour to the next, fans and people who had no idea who the sertanejo artist was went into a collective embrace" and that "many people were surprised by the sudden commotion at the singer's tragic death. The surprise, however, is not due to the fact that he was so famous and so unknown at the same time". The comments generated controversy on the Internet and fans created pages and memes to criticize the journalist, even other singers from the country music scene published photos with their hands pressed to their ears, showing their rejection of the comment. When he apologized during the Video Show, he made another gaffe by calling the singer by the name of the Portuguese footballer Cristiano Ronaldo.

Due to the chronicle, Zeca had to pay compensation to Cristiano's family, with the lawsuit drawn up by the artist's father João Reis de Araújo.

== Filmography ==
Year	Title	Role	Station	Notes
1990–92	Semana Rock MTV	Host	MTV Brasil	
1990–94	MTV no Ar	Host	MTV Brasil	
1994	Fanzine	Host	TV Cultura	
1996–07	Fantástico	Reporter	TV Globo	
2007–13	Fantástico	Host	TV Globo	
1997	Som Brasil	Host	TV Globo	
1998–2001	Show da Virada	Host	TV Globo	
2000–09	No Limite	Host	TV Globo	
2002	Hipertensão	Host	TV Globo	
2003	O Jogo	Host	TV Globo	
2013–15	Vídeo Show	Host	TV Globo	
2015–20	É de Casa	Host	TV Globo	
2017	Os Dias Eram Assim	Host of the festival	TV Globo	Episodes: "September 4–15"
2020	Amor de Mãe	Himself	TV Globo	Episode: "February 5"
2021	Música na Band	Host	TV Band	
2021–22	Zeca pelo Brasil	Host	TV Band	
2022–23	1001 Perguntas	Host	TV Band	
2023–24	Band Folia: Salvador Carnival	Host	TV Band	
2023	Papo com Sabor	Host	TV Band	
2023–24	Melhor da Noite	Host	TV Band	
2024–present	Passaporte	Host	Times Brasil	

== Books ==
- A fantástica volta ao mundo: registros e bastidores de viagem. São Paulo: Editora Globo, 2004.
- De A-ha a U2 : os bastidores das entrevistas do mundo da música. São Paulo: Editora Globo, 2006.
- 1.000 Lugares Fantásticos no Brasil. São Paulo: Editora Globo, 2006.
- Novos Olhares. São Paulo: Editora Globo, 2007.
- Isso aqui é seu: a volta ao mundo por patrimônios da humanidade. São Paulo: Editora Globo, 2009.
- Medida certa: como chegamos lá (with Renata Ceribelli). São Paulo: Editora Globo, 2011.
- Eu ando pelo mundo: Paris. E-galáxia, 2016.
- 50, eu?. E-galáxia, 2018.
- Elza. São Paulo: Leya, 2018.
- Índia: sabores e sensações: uma viagem que explora as receitas vegetarianas do país (with . São Paulo: )Companhia de Mesa, 2019.
- Quase normal: contos. São Paulo: Todavia, 2020
