= Celso Freitas =

Brazilian journalist (born 1953)

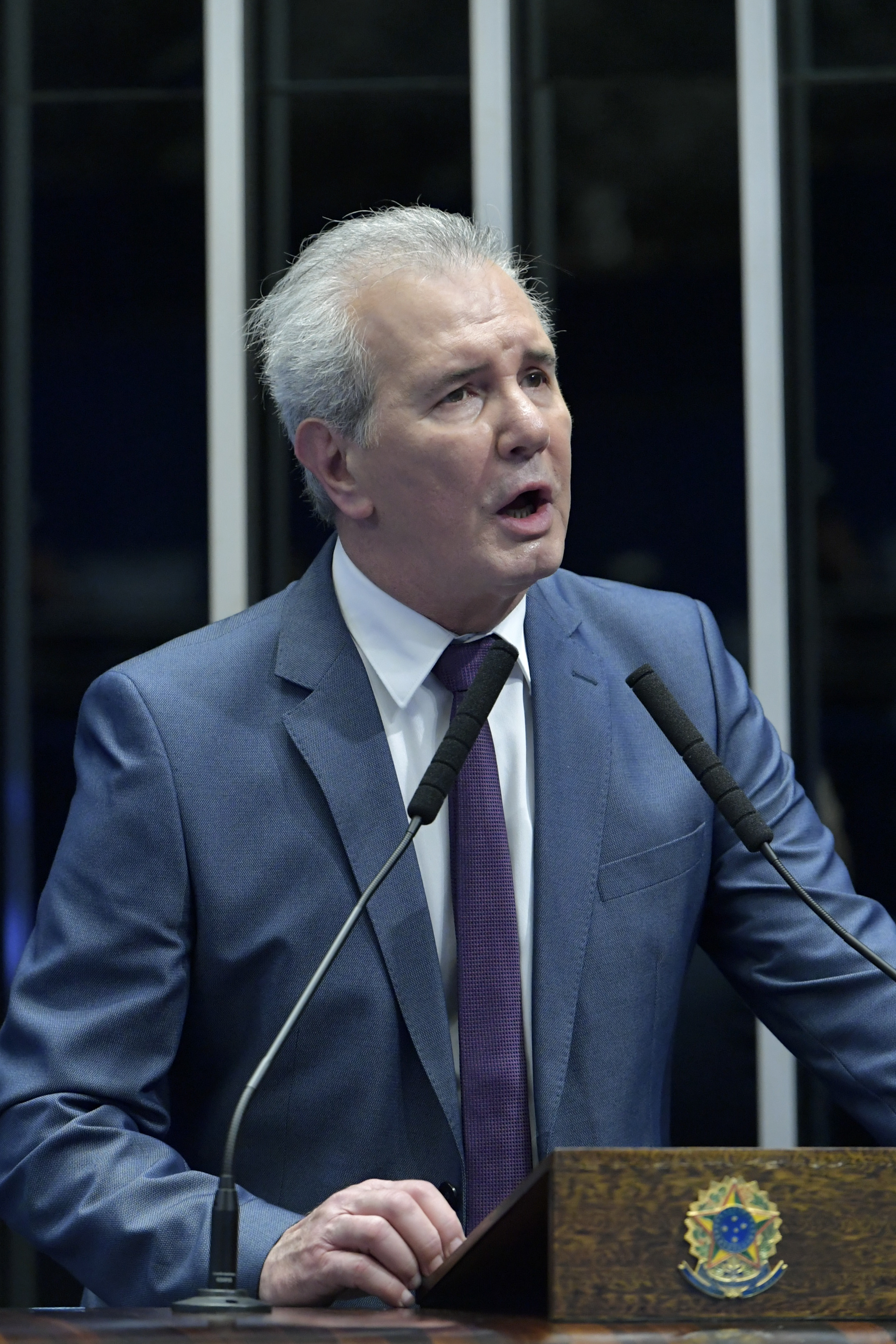
- In a speech, to the Federal Senate rostrum during a solemn session of the National Congress in honor of RecordTV's 65th anniversary. Photo: Geraldo Magela/Agência Senado.
- Born: September 18, 1953 (age 72); Criciúma, Santa Catarina, Brazil
- Occupation(s): Journalist and TV host
- Children: 4

Celso Freitas (born September 18, 1953) is a Brazilian journalist and TV host. Freitas is known for his strong and deep voice.

== Biography ==
=== Beginnings in local journalism ===
He graduated in journalism from the Faculty of Social Communication Cásper Líbero. He began his career as an intern, at the age of 16, at the radio Eldorado from Criciúma, interpreting commercials. He listened to radio stations at Difusora and later worked at radio stations Colon in Joinville, Diário da Manhã and Guarujá, in Florianópolis. Serving in the Army Police in Brasília, he drew attention for his voice when interviewed on Rádio Nacional and ended up hired by TV Globo Brasília. Before completing his military service, he already presented the local part of Jornal Nacional. It was the beginning of the professionalization of Brazilian television journalism and Celso was headed by Armando Nogueira and an intern for Heron Domingues. He remained in Brasília until 1976, when he was transferred to TV Globo São Paulo, presenting the local blocks of Jornal Nacional (later, Jornal das Sete, embryo of SPTV) and Jornal Hoje.

=== Jornal Nacional, Fantástico and Globo Repórter ===
==== Duo with Cid Moreira ====
In 1983, succeeding Sérgio Chapelin, he started to form a duo with Cid Moreira at Jornal Nacional. In a decade marked by great transformations in the world and in Brazil, Celso reported on JN events such as the discovery and developments of AIDS, the Chernobyl nuclear accident (1986), the explosion of the Challenger spacecraft (1986), Diretas Já, the end of the military dictatorship, the election, agony and death of elected president Tancredo Neves, redemocratization and the promulgation of the Constitution.

==== Historical editions of Fantástico ====
In 1989, he left the presentation of Jornal Nacional to be the head of Fantástico and Globo Repórter, attractions that he had already presented several times. It was a period marked by editorial changes in both programs, which began to focus more on urban problems and complaints and investigations. At Fantástico, Celso shared the presentation with several colleagues, such as Dóris Giesse, Carolina Ferraz, Paula Saldanha, William Bonner and Valéria Monteiro.

In 1992, Fátima Bernardes and Sandra Annenberg began to form a trio with Celso in Fantástico. During the period in which they presented together, the program changed its format, started to use more computer graphics resources, gained a looser presentation and, for the first time, abolished the bench. They led some of the most remarkable editions in the history of Fantástico: the first Olympic gold in Brazilian volleyball (1992), the tragedy with Ayrton Senna in Ímola (1994), the Brazilian team's fourth FIFA World Cup conquest (1994) and the fatal accident with members of the band Mamonas Assassinas (1996).

"The death of Ayrton Senna shakes Brazil. The country loses one of the greatest idols in the history of sport", announced Celso in one of the Fantástico flashes shown on the afternoon of May 1, 1994. That Sunday, for the first time, Fantástico - which is prepared during the week, had to be completely redone. At the opening, Celso said: "Thus, the way he always lived, without fear of danger, on the way to a new victory, three-time champion Ayrton Senna da Silva met his death at the age of 34."

On March 3, 1996, Celso opened Fantástico by announcing: "Brazil dawned sadder today. All the members of the irreverent group Mamonas Assassinas, the greatest phenomenon in the recent history of Brazilian music, are dead."

==== Other programs ====
He remained at the presentation of Fantástico and Globo Repórter until 1996, when he joined the team that opened GloboNews, the first Brazilian channel exclusively for news, presenting Arquivo N and Via Brasil, where he stayed for eight years. On TV Globo, he presented the program Você Decide between 1998 and 1999. From then on, Celso began to share with Cid Moreira the voiceover for Fantástico's openings and special reports, such as the coverage of the Brazilian National Team's fifth FIFA World Cup conquest campaign and the election of Lula as president, in 2002. He also recorded some albums with excerpts from the Bible with Cid Moreira.

In the 1990s, in parallel with his career as a TV Globo presenter, Celso created, produced and presented programs such as Hipermídia, shown on the GNT channel, one of the first to deal with information technology on Brazilian TV. Another program created by him was Tribos e Trilhas, about tourism, in partnership with reporter Neide Duarte, shown on TV Cultura. At the same time, he was the "standard voice" of CBN radio, providing voice for the station's openings, vignettes and promos.

=== Domingo Espetacular and Jornal da Record ===
In 2004, Celso left TV Globo after three decades after accepting an invitation from RecordTV. He was the first big name in a wave of Globo professionals hired by Record with the aim of implementing a quality standard at the broadcaster and taking audience away from the competitor. Domingo Espetacular, an 'electronic magazine' inspired by Fantástico, debuted on April 18, presented by Celso and Lorena Calábria and directed by Carlos Amorim.

Two years later, he left Domingo Espetacular and started presenting Jornal da Record on January 30, 2006. Over the course of almost two decades at the helm of the station's main news program, he formed duos with Adriana Araújo (2006-2009/2013- 2020), Ana Paula Padrão (2009–2013) and Christina Lemos (2020-). During this period, Jornal da Record established itself as the second network news program with the highest audience during prime time in Brazil. At JR, Celso interviewed Brazilian presidents and their opponents in elections, and anchored the election and inauguration of Barack Obama (2008/2009) - the first black president of the United States, and the 2007 Pan American Games, in Rio de Janeiro.

==== Historical editions of Jornal da Record ====
On the Jornal da Record bench, Celso was the voice of notable editions, such as the attacks by criminal factions in São Paulo (2006), the accidents with Gol planes (2006), TAM (2007) and Chapecoense (2016), the cases of Eloá and Isabela Nardoni (2008), the floods in Santa Catarina (2008), the election (2009) the 2016 Summer Olympics in Rio, the 2008 financial crisis, the natural disasters in Rio (2010), the violent attacks and police occupation of favelas in Rio (2010), the Realengo massacre (2011), the earthquake, tsunami and nuclear accident in Japan (2011), the fire at the Kiss nightclub (2013), the resignation of Pope Benedict XVI and the election of Pope Francis (2013), of the June protests in Brazil (2013), of Operation Lava-Jato (2014–2021), of the impeachment of Dilma Rousseff (2016), of the first Olympic gold of the Brazilian National Team Football (2016), the arrest of Luiz Inácio Lula da Silva (2018), the murder of Marielle Franco (2018), the truck drivers' strike in Brazil (2018), the deaths of friends and broadcaster colleagues Marcelo Rezende (2017), Paulo Henrique Amorim (2019) and Gugu Liberato (2019), the rise and fall of Donald Trump and Jair Bolsonaro, the attacks on the United States Capitol (2021) and the headquarters of the Three Powers of Brazil (2023), among others.

==== COVID-19 pandemic ====
In the first months of 2020, he even reported in Jornal da Record the spread of a "mysterious virus"/"new coronavirus" throughout China, Europe and the United States, the first cases and deaths in Brazil, until the WHO declared the pandemic of COVID-19 in March, when Celso was removed from work because he was part of the risk group of people over 60 years of age. He stayed away from TV, but worked from home for the broadcaster's digital platforms. In August 2021, he definitively returned to the bench after taking two doses of the vaccine.

==== Other work at Grupo Record ====
In parallel with Jornal da Record, since 2020, he presents JR 15 Minutos, a podcast that addresses topics in depth, with the participation of a guest reporter and expert. In 2022, he presented the podcast/videocast 100 Anos do Rádio no Brasil (100 Years of the Radio in Brazil). He has also served as presenter for Jornal da Record with Repórter Record (2005–2008), Entrevista Record - Bastidores da Notícia na Record News (2007–2012) and end-of-year specials. He was the mediator of all Record presidential debates since 2006. He also led, as master of ceremonies, the inaugurations of Record News (2007) - the first news channel on Brazilian open TV, and the portal R7.com (2009).

== Personal life ==
He is married to administrator Suely, mother of his daughter Juliana. He is also the father of Marcelo, Renato and Luiz Celso, from his first marriage, when he was still 18 years old. His son Marcelo Freitas died on August 20, 2018, aged 45, from a heart attack.
