= Renato Machado =

Brazilian newscaster and journalist (1943–2026)

- Born: 21 March 1943; Rio de Janeiro, Brazil
- Died: 16 July 2026 (aged 83); Rio de Janeiro, Brazil
- Education: Pontifícia Universidade Católica do Rio de Janeiro
- Occupations: journalist TV presenter reporter
- Years active: 1970–2026
- Notable work: Bom Dia Brasil; Jornal da Globo; Jornal Nacional (Rede Globo)
- Spouse(s): Danuza Leão (married 1980–2011); Monica Morel (married 2011–2026)
- Children: Maria Eduarda Machado

Renato Machado (21 March 1943 – 16 July 2026) was a Brazilian newscaster and journalist.

From 1996 to 2011, he was the editor-in-chief and anchorman of Bom Dia Brasil ("Good Morning Brazil"). From 1982 to 1983, he also served as the presenter of Jornal da Globo.

== Life and career ==
Machado graduated in law and journalism from the Pontifical Catholic University of Rio de Janeiro and began his career in radio in 1970. In 39 years of profession, the reporter, presenter, and editor worked for the BBC. Later, he worked for Jornal do Brasil and the defunct Rede Manchete (where he presented Noite Dia, the new name for Jornal da Manchete Segunda Edição).

He began his career in theater, participating in amateur groups and acting in productions such as The Tempest by William Shakespeare and The Terrible Children and Antigone. With the inauguration of Rede Globo de Televisão in 1965, he acted in two soap operas as a supporting actor: Rosinha do Sobrado, the network's second soap opera, and the first version of A Moreninha, both starring Marília Pêra. At TV Excelsior, he worked on the first version of Sangue do Meu Sangue from 1969 to 1970. He also dubbed American series and, in 1966, acted in the film O Mundo Alegre de Helô.

Machado was an international correspondent based in New York City who covered elections, political and economic negotiations, agreements, and wars in Honduras, El Salvador, Nicaragua, and the Persian Gulf. Back in Brazil, he did special reports for Fantástico and Globo Repórter.

He presented Jornal da Globo in 1982-1983, RJTV between 1989-1990 and 1992, Jornal Nacional occasionally from 1995 to 2011, and Fantástico Especial on 31 December 1995.

In 1982, he presented the first Plantão JN about the Falklands War. That program was the first on Brazilian television. At the time, the image on the screen was Plantão JN, and Renato spoke off-screen.

From 1996 to 2011, Renato was the editor-in-chief and presenter of Bom Dia Brasil, where he led a team of approximately 30 people. During this period, the news program changed its focus slightly to include more culture, music, and gastronomy. He shared the news desk with Renata Vasconcellos for most of this period.

Machado was also one of the occasional presenters of Jornal Nacional, replacing William Bonner and Fátima Bernardes.

He was a classical music lover and was known in Brazil as a great connoisseur of wines and gastronomy. In addition to being a wine critic for the newspaper O Globo and Rádio CBN, he authored the series Reserva Especial, produced by the GNT channel. The program reveals the secrets of producing the best wines in Europe. He presented the program Menu Confiança with the French chef Claude Troisgros, based in Brazil, where he pairs wines and recipes.

Machado was married to columnist Danuza Leão. He was the father of actress Maria Eduarda Machado, who starred in the soap opera Malhação in 2007. In 2009, Renato had to undergo last-minute bypass surgery, which left him away from Bom Dia Brasil for over a month, and he was replaced by journalist Márcio Gomes. In January 2011, after his vacation, Renato returned to host Bom Dia Brasil, only accumulating the presenter role, giving way to Miguel Athayde as editor-in-chief of the news program. In September of the same year, he returned to being an international correspondent in London with stories for Globo's news programs and a weekly column in Jornal da Globo. On 11 December 2015, during Bom Dia Brasil, Renato announced his departure from the London news program and return to Brazil. Upon returning to Brazil, the journalist began working at Globo Repórter as a special reporter. His first report for the program aired in June 2016 with a report by Machado about a ballerina from Morro da Mangueira who became a star in New York City.

In November 2021, Machado was fired by Rede Globo, after more than 40 years of service.

Machado died on 16 July 2026, at the age of 83.
