= Mariana Gross =

Brazilian journalist (born 1979)

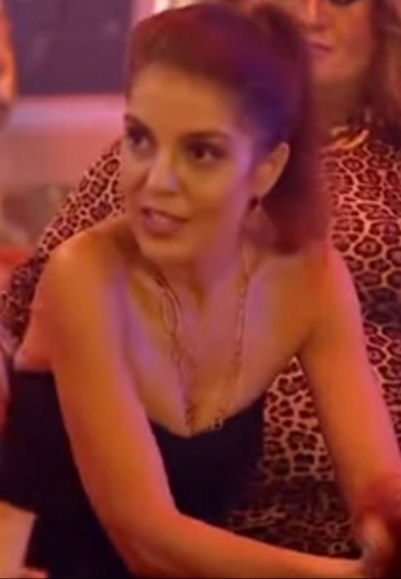
- Gross in 2023.
- Born: April 6, 1979 (age 47); Rio de Janeiro, Brazil
- Occupations: Journalist and TV host
- Children: 1

Mariana Pinheiro Gross, best known as Mariana Gross (born April 6, 1979), is a Brazilian journalist and TV host.

== Biography ==
Graduated in Journalism by UniverCidade, Gross started her career staging on the radio CBN. In 2000, she faced her first big professional challenge: the hijacking of the bus 174. From her first experience on the profession, Gross carries an interview in a bar with the former president Fidel Castro.

On the television, Gross debuted on TV Globo. In 2001, she made reports to RJTV, Jornal da Globo, Jornal Hoje, Bom Dia Brasil and Jornal Nacional. Gross presented Radar RJ, aired inside Bom Dia Rio and did part of the rotation of presenters of RJTV and occasionally, Bom Dia Rio.

In 2013, alongside the journalist Alex Escobar, Gross was responsible to narrate the transmission of the parade of Série A (formerly Access Group), on the Rio Carnival.

On September 30, 2012, with Ana Paula Araújo going to Bom Dia Brasil, Gross was effectived as the presenter of RJTV first edition.

On July 16, 2018, she debuted as occasional presenter of Bom Dia Brasil.

On November 2, 2019, as part of the celebration of the 50 years of Jornal Nacional, Gross debuted on the bench of the newscast, representing the state of Rio de Janeio, in which she divided the bench with Marcelo Magno, from Piauí.

On January 30, 2022, Gross debuted on Fantástico, replacing Maju Coutinho, diagnosticated with COVID-19.

== Awards and nominations ==
Year	Award	Category	Result	Ref.
2024	Melhores do Ano NaTelinha	Best Local Presenter	Nominated	

== Personal life ==
Gross is married to the economist Guilherme Schiller, with whom she has a son named Antônio, born in 2015. She is a fan of Flamengo.
