= Marcos Hummel =

Brazilian television anchor

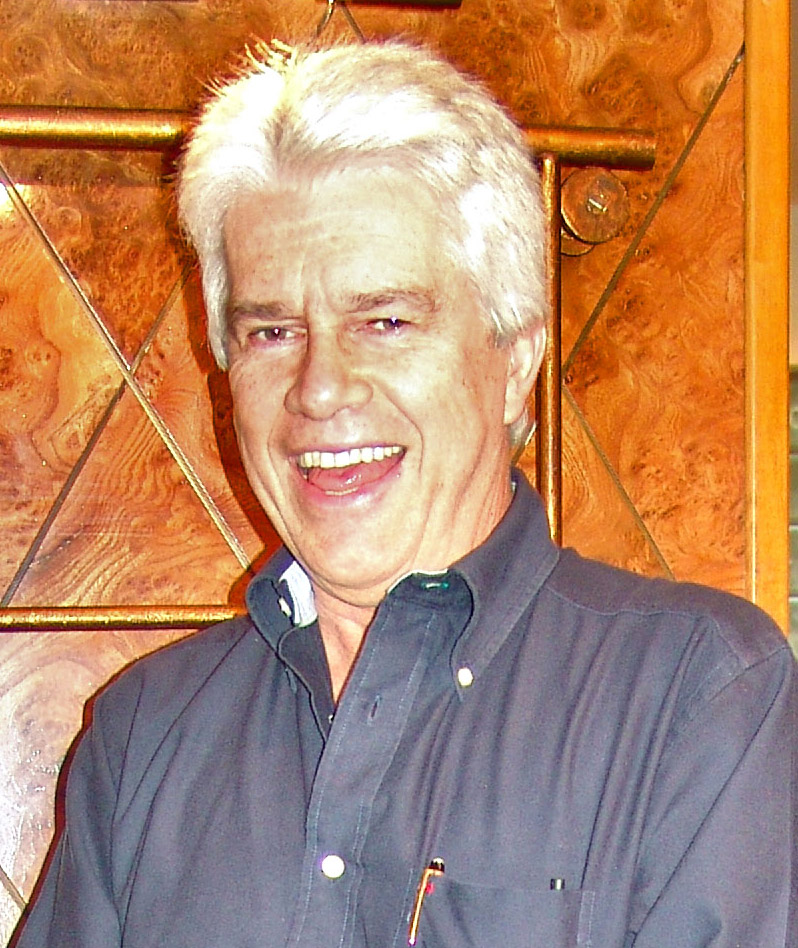
Marcos Hummel.

Marcos Hummel (born July 25, 1947) is a Brazilian television anchor, employed by national television station Rede Record.

== Biography ==
Marcos Hummel was born in Catalão, state of Goiás, Brazil. He started his career on Tele Journalism on June 22, 1975, in Brasília when he was 28 years old. He currently works for Rede Record.

Before joining TV Record, Hummel worked for 21 years in Rede Globo's news reports "Jornal Hoje", "Jornal Nacional", "Jornal da Globo", "Fantástico", "Globo Esporte", "Bom Dia Rio" and "Bom Dia São Paulo" and has served also as the publisher and editor. He was one of the first presenters of "Video Show". Also presented for three years the festivals "MPB80" and "MPB Shell", between the years 1980 and 1983 together with Cristiane Torloni, Miriam Rios, Luis Carlos Miele and Hilton Gomes.

After this period, he went to Rede Manchete. For two years he worked in "Manchete Verdade", "Journal da Manchete" and "Na Linha do Crime".

In 1998, he went to Rede Bandeirantes, where he presented the "Jornal da Band" until March 2004. He then went on to present the "Jornal das 10", on Rede 21. In October 2004, he joined Rede Record. He currently presents Camera Record on Fridays, Camera Record News (a spin-off show for Record News) and Jornal da Record as a relief and Saturday presenter. Besides presenting the news, he is also a narrator for certain segments on the Sunday night newsmagazine, Domingo Espetacular. Recently, he began presenting Camera Em Ação (Camera and Action), on TV Record which debuted in October 2012.
