= Isabela Scalabrini =

Brazilian journalist

- Born: Isabela de Carvalho Scalabrini; May 9, 1957 (age 69); Rio de Janeiro, Brazil
- Occupation: Journalist
- Children: 3
- Relatives: Nilson Klava (son-in-law)

Isabela Scalabrini Matte (née de Carvalho Scalabrini), better known as Isabela Scalabrini (born May 9, 1957), is a Brazilian journalist.

== Biography ==
Born in the Copacabana neighborhood, Scalabrini graduated in journalism by Faculdades Integradas Hélio Alonso, in Rio de Janeiro. Reporter of Globo since 1979, she was hired after a one-year paid internship. Scalabrini started in the apuration and six months later, she was to the Sports Department. When Scalabrini arrived in Globo, there's no one woman working there. The journalist started making reports to Globo Esporte, and she covered several sports modalities, with exception of the soccer, that was always destined to the men of the redation.

It was in the 1983 Pan American Games, in Caracas, Venezuela, that Scalabrini had her first opportunity of make an outstanding work. According to the journalist herself, she only was assigned to cover the competition because she had a "very modern" boss. During the competition, Brazil got several medals in the amateur sports, precisely that who Scalabrini was designed to cover, like rowing and swimming. Of this way, Scalabrini got, for first time, that her reports aired on Jornal Nacional, one of the main programs of the station. After her good performance on the 1983 Pan American Games, Scalabrini was assigned to cover the 1984 Olympic Games, in Los Angeles, and 1988, in Seoul, South Korea, and the 1986 World Cup, in Mexico, in addition to many volleyball and basketball championships. Scalabrini presented Globo Esporte, Esporte Espetacular and Fantástico in the 80s, and RJTV in the 90s.

=== 1984 Olympic Games ===
In the Los Angeles Olympics, Scalabrini accompanied the finish of the female marathon inside the Coliseum, where she did the report about the effort of the Swiss marathonist Gabrielle Andersen to complete the race. The image is considered one of the most importants of the world sports.

=== 1986 World Cup ===
In 1986, in the World Cup of Mexico, Scalabrini covered the Argentine Selection. She was practically the one female reporter. Scalabrini listened many little jokes of several nationalities. But was to her that Maradona gave an interview, that started exclusive in the concentration of the Argentine team, but that soon it became a conference with the running of the reporters, surprised, trying to reach her.

=== 1988 Olympic Games ===
Scalabrini did the polemical interview with Joaquim Cruz in which he reported the use of anabolics by the American Olympic Team after the disqualifying of the Canadian runner Ben Johnson by doping.

=== General editorial and Globo Minas ===
In 1992, Scalabrini changed sport by general editorial. In 1998, she was transferred to TV Globo Minas. Scalabrini was one of the first women to cover sports on Globo, during many years. She admits have faced some prejudice, in the covering of soccer, for example, but she was never disrespected. The journalist often says that the space that she doesn't conquered in the sports world was the locker room.

In September 2009, Scalabrini was one of the interviewed to speak about the 40 years of Jornal Nacional, being the first sports reporter of the newscast. The interview occurred in the studio of Jornal Nacional, in Rio de Janeiro. Scalabrini presented MGTV 1ª Edição until August 2019, when she passed to make street reports to local newscasts of TV Globo Minas and to Jornal Nacional.

On January 31, 2023, Scalabrini left TV Globo after 44 years on the station.

== Personal life ==
Scalabrini is married to the also journalist Marcelo Matte, with whom she has three children: Gabriela, Rafael and Pedro, and one grandchild.
