= Valéria Monteiro =

Brazilian journalist

- Born: Valéria Monteiro; 26 March 1965 (age 61); Belo Horizonte, MG, Brazil
- Occupations: Model actress, journalist, television presenter
- Years active: 1986–present
- Notable work: Fantástico (anchor, 1988–1991, 1993); Jornal Nacional (anchor, 1992)
- Political party: PMN (Since 2018)
- Spouses: Justin Kaufman (m. 1994; div. 1998) Paulo Ubiratan (m. 1989; div. 1992)
- Children: Vitoria (b. 1990)

Valéria Monteiro (born 26 March 1965 in Belo Horizonte) is a Brazilian journalist, model, actress, and television presenter, member of the Party of National Mobilization (PMN).

== Biography ==
Model and ballet dancer, started her journalism career in Campinas, in a TV broadcaster affiliated to Rede Record. In 1986, was hired by Rede Globo to present RJTV, local afternoon news program in Rio de Janeiro. Later, acted as anchor of Fantástico between 1988 and 1991, and of Jornal Hoje.

Monteiro was the first woman to host Jornal Nacional in 1992. In 1993, returned to Fantástico. In 1994, she covered the January edition of Playboy. In 1995, was present of GNT Fashion. After that, acted in the miniseries Incidente em Antares. In 1996, had a brief passage through Rede Manchete. Moved to New York with her daughter Vitoria, born during her marriage with the director Paulo Ubiratan, who died in 1998.

Valérias was also married to realtor Justin Kaufman, and she lived in the United States. Currently, the presenter is single.

In the U.S., she worked for Discovery Channel, Bloomberg and NBC. She returned to Brazil in 1999, and was hired by RedeTV!, where she presented the first phase of A Casa É Sua. Her last work in television was as advertisement girl of José Serra's electoral campaign.

Currently, she owns an independent production company named Toda América and presents the show Mondo on the radio broadcaster Paradiso FM, based in Rio de Janeiro.

On 19 May 2014, she returned to television to command O Show da Vida é Fantástico in Canal Viva.

On 22 September 2017, Monteiro announced herself as a pre-candidate for President of Brazil. Monteiro joined the Party of National Mobilization (PMN) on 12 January 2018. However, the party gave up on her candidacy, as she didn't reach 3% of the intention of votes in the opinion polls.
