= Nilson Klava =

Brazilian journalist

- Born: Francenilson Paulo Klava; December 3, 1995 (age 30); Apucarana, Paraná, Brazil
- Occupation: Journalist
- Relatives: Isabela Scalabrini (mother-in-law)

Francenilson Paulo Klava, better known as Nilson Klava (born December 3, 1995), is a Brazilian journalist.

== Biography and career ==
Born in Apucarana, Paraná, from Latvian ancestry and graduated in journalism from the Pontifical Catholic University of Rio de Janeiro, Klava is reporter of GloboNews since 2016. Currently, he covers political affairs in Brasília. For GloboNews, Klava released reports about the impeachment procedure of the former president Dilma Rousseff. He participated activally of the votes of the reports against the president Michel Temer by the Chamber of Deputies and of the votes of the reforms of the pension and labor by the National Congress. In March 2018, Klava made his debut in Fantástico, from TV Globo, being the youngest journalist to occupy the function.

In 2023, Klava temporarily presented Jornal das Dez, from GloboNews, covering the maternity leave of the main presenter, Aline Midlej. In March 2024, with the announce of the exit of Tiago Eltz of the function of anchor of GloboNews em Ponto, Klava was effectived as the new main presenter alongside Mônica Waldvogel on April 1.

In July 2023, Klava debuted as eventual presenter of Jornal Hoje. Since April 2024, he acts as commentator of politics and economy in the same newscast.

Klava would leave the presentation of GloboNews em Ponto and the politics and economy block, in addition to the occasional presentation of Jornal Hoje in July 2025, when he passed to take over the function of international correspondent of TV Globo in New York City, United States.

== Personal life ==
Since 2022, Klava is married to the also journalist Gabriela Scalabrini Matte, daughter of the also journalists Isabela Scalabrini and Marcelo Matte. He is a fan of Palmeiras.
