= William Bonner (newscaster) =

Brazilian newscaster, publicist and journalist

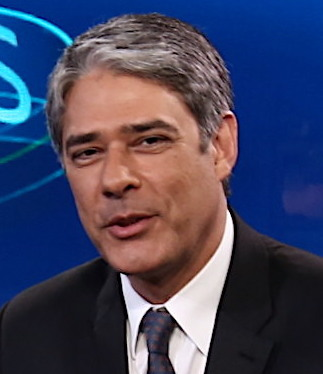
- William Bonner in August 2018
- Born: William Bonemer Júnior; 16 November 1963 (age 62); São Paulo, Brazil
- Education: University of São Paulo
- Occupations: Journalist, publicist, Anchor
- Years active: 1985–present
- Notable credit(s): Jornal Nacional (1996–2025); Jornal da Globo (1989–1993); Jornal Hoje (1994–1996); Fantástico (1988–1990); SPTV (1986–1989)
- Spouses: Fátima Bernardes (m. 1990; div. 2016) Natasha Dantas (m. 2018)
- Children: 3
- Relatives: Christian de Toledo Bonemer (cousin); Hugo Bonemer (second cousin)

William Bonemer Júnior, known professionally as William Bonner (born 16 November 1963), is a Brazilian newscaster, publicist and journalist. He was the editor-in-chief of TV Globo's flagship news program Jornal Nacional from 1999 until 2025 and as anchorman of the program from 1996 to 2025.

In 2026 he became a cohost on the Globo Repórter television program alongside Sandra Annenberg.

== Biography ==
Bonner graduated in Mass Communications with emphasis in Advertising and Publicity from the School of Arts and Communication, University of São Paulo (ECA-USP) and began his professional career in advertising in 1983.

In 1985, he started working at Radio USPFM and was eventually hired as announcer and television host on TV Bandeirantes until June 1986. He then moved to Rede Globo, assigned as editor and presenter of SPTV, a São Paulo local news program and, later, host of Fantástico.

Upon moving to Rio the following year, he was the main newscaster of Jornal da Globo between 1989 and 1992 alongside Fátima Bernardes and, between 1994 and 1996, editor-in-chief and newscaster of Jornal Hoje.

Between April 1996 to October 2025, after Cid Moreira and Sergio Chapelin left their positions, Bonner became lead anchor for 29 years and, later, editor-in-chief for 26 years, of Jornal Nacional, Globo's main weekly news program, alongside Fátima Bernardes, Patrícia Poeta and lastly, Renata Vasconcellos.

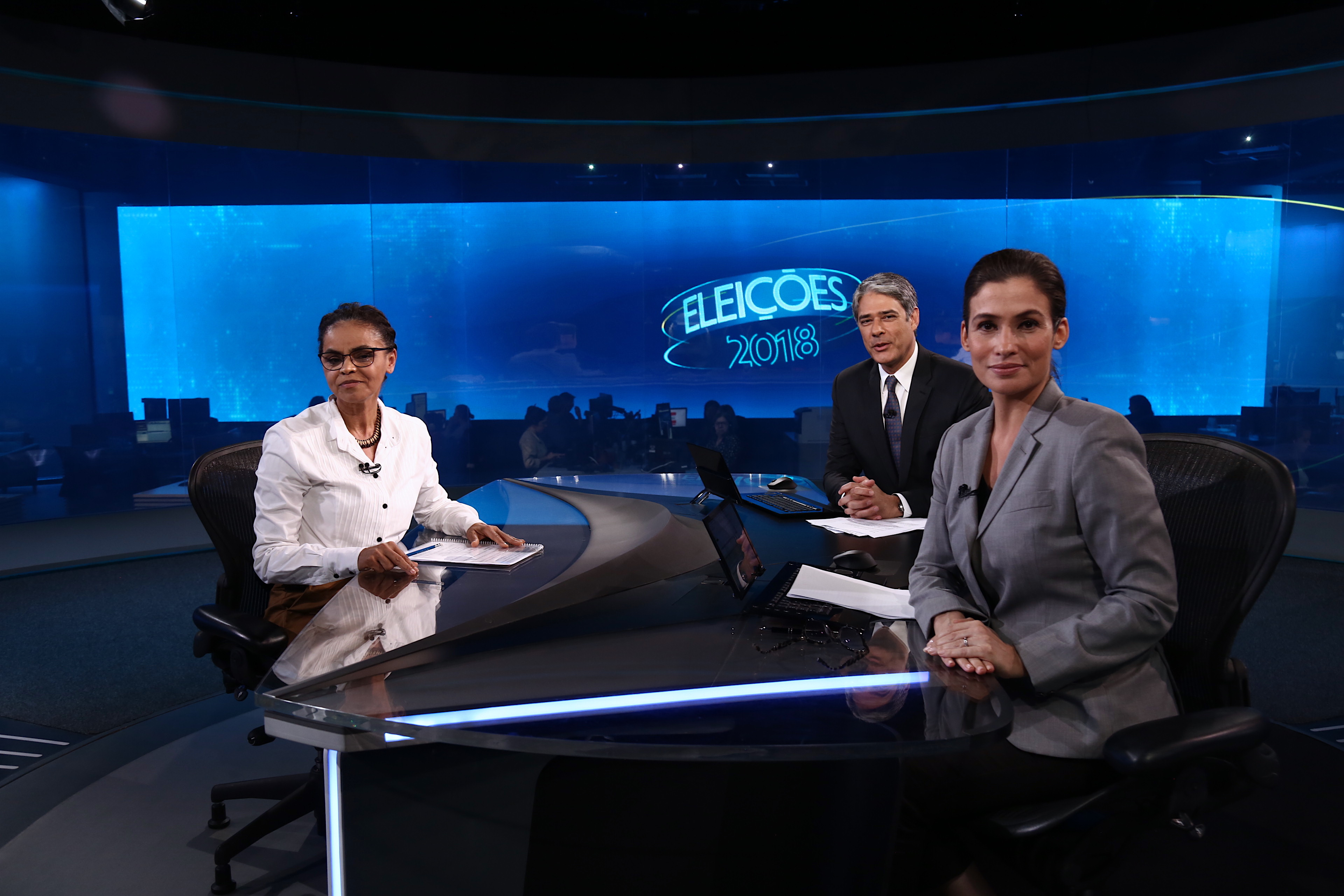
Bonner and Renata Vasconcellos on Jornal Nacional in August 2018, during an interview with politician Marina Silva, then a candidate for president of Brazil

== Personal life ==
Bonner met Fátima Bernardes when they were the main newscasters of SPTV in 1986; they married in 1990 and had triplets: Beatriz, Laura, and Vinicius in 1997. They announced their separation on 29 August 2016, via Twitter. In September 2018, he married his then-girlfriend Natasha Dantas, a physical therapist. The couple lives in Rio de Janeiro.

In 2009, Bonner released a book, Jornal Nacional: Modo de Fazer, a tribute to the 40 years of the Jornal Nacional, where he reveals the making of the show. He is a São Paulo FC fan.

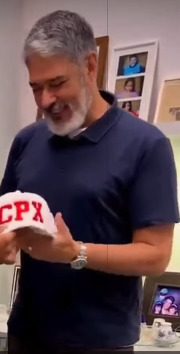
Bonner in 2023

== News programs ==
- SPTV (1986–1989);
- Fantástico (1988–1990);
- Jornal da Globo (1989–1993);
- Jornal Hoje (1993–1996);
- Jornal Nacional (1996–2025; as editor-in-chief from 1999–2025)
- Globo Repórter (from February 2026)

=== Stand-in presenter ===
- Jornal Nacional (1988–1996)
