= Adriana Araújo (journalist) =

Brazilian journalist

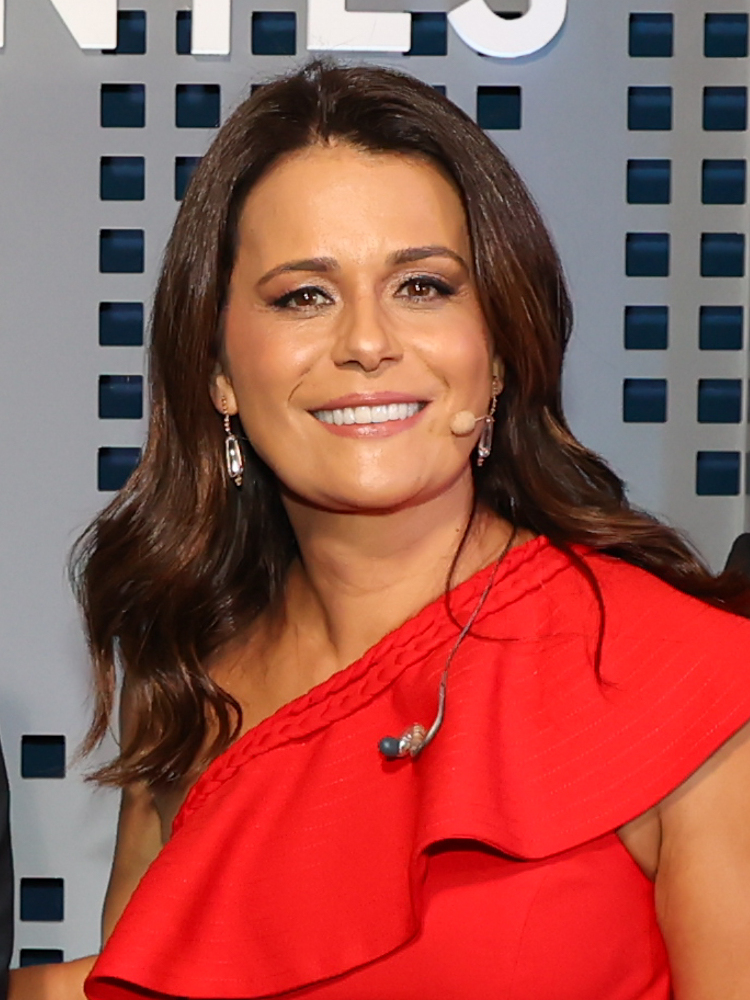
- Araújo in 2025.
- Born: April 18, 1972 (age 54); Itabirito, Minas Gerais, Brazil
- Occupation: Journalist
- Children: 1

Adriana Fátima de Araújo, best known as Adriana Araújo (born April 18, 1972), is a Brazilian journalist.

== Career ==
Born in Itabirito, Minas Gerais, she graduated in journalism from the Pontifical Catholic University of Minas Gerais. She began her career in 1992 as a reporter for the newspaper Diário do Comércio, from Belo Horizonte and TV Globo Minas. In 1995, she moved to TV Globo, writing articles for Jornal Nacional and Bom Dia Brasil. In 2002, she was transferred to Brasília, becoming a politics and economics reporter for Jornal Hoje.

In January 2006, she was hired by RecordTV to present alongside Celso Freitas the new Jornal da Record and, from 2007, also the Entrevista Record on Record News. In 2009, with the hiring of Ana Paula Padrão to present Jornal da Record, Adriana became a correspondent in New York. In 2010 she traveled from Chile to cover the rescue of miners trapped in San José to Japan to cover the Fukushima nuclear accident. On November 1, 2010, Adriana interviewed the newly elected president Dilma Rousseff exclusively for Jornal da Record. In 2012 she was sent to London to cover the 2012 Summer Olympics.

Between December 2, 2012, and March 17, 2013, she was part of the quartet of hosts of the weekly Domingo Espetacular, alongside Paulo Henrique Amorim, Janine Borba and Fabiana Scaranzi. On March 26, 2013, Adriana returned to command, along with Celso Freitas, Jornal da Record after the departure of Ana Paula Padrão. In 2020 she was transferred from Jornal da Record to Repórter Record Investigação. In 2021, dissatisfied with the little space, she left RecordTV and signed with Band.

In January 2022, the journalist debuted as an interviewer for Canal Livre. A few days later, Band confirmed the creation of a new newscast for lunchtime with a presentation by the new hire, which occurred on April 4, with the premiere of the local newscast Boa Tarde São Paulo. Before that, she also debuted on radio BandNews FM with the Entre Nós program. On June 5, 2023, journalist Adriana Araújo takes over definitively as the bench at Jornal da Band.

== Awards ==
Adriana Araújo received the "Francisco Homem Del Rey" Medal in 2013, the highest award granted by the legislature of the municipality of Itabirito, Minas Gerais, the journalist's birthplace.

In 2012, the report O Inferno de Potosí (The Hell of Potosí), made by her in Bolivia and shown on Domingo Espetacular, was a finalist for the Esso Journalism Award. The report showed the working conditions of miners in the mountains of Potosí, considered analogous to slavery.

== Book ==
While still pregnant, Adriana Araújo discovered that her daughter would have a rare and serious orthopedic syndrome, fibular hemimelia, a disease that brought Giovanna into the world with deformed leg and foot bones and only two fingers on her right hand. Questions like "Mom, am I disabled?" and "Mom, if I pray a lot, will God grow fingers on my hand?" were some of which Adriana heard from her daughter. In 18 years, Giovanna underwent ten surgeries to be able to walk with her own legs.

In addition to everything they faced between doctor's offices and hospitalizations, the book Sou a Mãe Dela (I'm Her Mother) also deals with another permanent and even more important battle: social inclusion. In the work, the journalist narrates in a strong and moving way about guilt, pain, weaknesses, fears and, at the same time, talks about the path that she and her daughter found to follow without victimization. At a time when it is necessary to say yes to life and science, Sou a Mãe Dela brings texts that Adriana produced as a gesture of gratitude to the family and doctors who cared for Giovanna. The book is a declaration of love from a mother to her daughter that made her see that the true beauty of life is in the scars, not in perfection.
