= Ernesto Paglia =

Brazilian television journalist (born 1959)

- Born: April 9, 1959 (age 67); São Paulo, Brazil
- Education: University of São Paulo
- Occupation: Journalist
- Years active: 1979–present
- Spouse: Sandra Annenberg
- Partner: since 1994
- Children: 3

Ernesto Paglia (born 9 April 1959, in São Paulo) is a Brazilian journalist. Studied Journalism at the School of Communications and Arts at the University of São Paulo.

Began working at 19, while still in the third year of Journalism School, (which requires 4 years in Brazil). Paglia was hired as reporter by Jovem Pan radio, but lasted only 3 months in this first job. He was fired after taking part in a strike led by the Journalist Union of S.Paulo in May 1979.

Immediately after, began working as night shift reporter for the S.Paulo local station of Rede Globo, the main Brazilian commercial television network, where Paglia worked for the next 43 years, until 2022.

In 1980, only one year later, Paglia was already being assigned to cover important events, such as the São Bernardo's metalworkers' strikes that opposed the military regime and brought to prominence the future three-term president, then union leader Luís Inácio "Lula" da Silva. The same year, Paglia joined one of two special itinerary crews created by Globo to cover the first visit of Pope John Paul II to Brazil.

== Career ==
In 1982, Paglia was sent to Spain for his first FIFA World Cup coverage. He would take part in the news coverage of 7 other World Cups (Mexico (1986), Italy (1990), USA (1994), Japan/S. Korea (2002)), Germany (2006), South Africa (2010) and Brazil (2014) mostly doing feature stories but also covering football events. Paglia also integrated the crews sent by Globo to the Olympic Games of Barcelona (1992), Atlanta (1996), Beijing (2008) and the Rio (2007) Pan American Games.

In 1983, Paglia was designated to Globo Repórter, during the complete restructuring of the weekly Brazilian main news documentaries program. During the next 3 years, he worked exclusively for the prestigious news documentary show. Since then, Paglia has been involved in the production of more than 60 documentaries, mostly covering environmental issues. Traveling extensively for Globo Repórter's productions, Paglia has visited the Arctic and Antarctica twice, and has been assigned to coverages in Asia, Middle East, Africa and South America.

In 1986, Paglia became one of the youngest ever Globo's international correspondents, based at the prestigious London Bureau. During three years, he would cover European current affairs, Brazilian interests in the region and Africa, and the Iran-Iraq war, visiting Baghdad and Basrah.

In 1989, Paglia returned to Brazil to work, primarily, for the main nightly news bulletin on Brazilian television, Globo's 'Jornal Nacional.

Paglia took part in shaping the first news only Brazilian television channel, Globo News, creating and presenting the weekly news review talk show Painel for 3 years. The journalist left again for London in 2000, for another 2 year long period as international correspondent, when he covered the Palestinian Intifada and the American invasion of Afghanistan. He was selected "best Brazilian TV reporter" by the prestigious Comunique-se Journalism Award five times, in 2004, 2007, 2009,2011 and 2017.

In 2010, Paglia was assigned to the Special Projects Unit of the Globo News Central ( CGJ ), to lead the new Globo Mar series, developed envisioning an innovative use of the journalistic language to produce 22 minutes long news documentaries about sea-related topics. Globo Mar aired with successful ratings for 4 consecutive seasons until 2013, year in which the show, representing TV Globo, was awarded the Marine Honorable Mention at the SOS Mata Atlântica/Conservation International Reports Award.

Globo Mar contribution to the brazilian awareness of oceanic matters was recognised by the Brazilian Navy. In connection to his role in the show, Paglia was included as member of the "Ordem do Mérito Naval" (Order of The Naval Merit) and awarded the "Medalha do Mérito Tamandaré" (Merit Medal Tamandaré).

In 2010, Paglia headed the team of 8 journalists and TV engineers formed for project "JN no Ar" ( Jornal Nacional on Air) . The initiative was developed as a new format to produce original stories for the coverage of Brazilian reality ahead of the 2010 presidential elections.

The project consisted of a sequence of 27 stories, one per day at each of the Brazilian states (including the Federal District, Brasília). Aboard an executive jet plane, the crew criss-crossed daily the continental country to get to cities chosen by a draw, realized live every night during Jornal Nacional, main Globo's news bulletin. The marathon was described by the reporter in the book "Diário de Bordo do JN no Ar:Cruzando o país numa cobertura histórica" ( "JN on Air - A log book: crossing the country on a historic coverage" ), published in May 2011 by Editora Globo.

From 2014 until 2016, the TV reporter was the host of the brazilian version of ABC News format "What would you do?". In 2017, Paglia has returned as special reporter at the popular and traditional sunday evening news and entertainment show "Fantástico".

In April 2023, the journalist returned for the third time to Greenland to shoot the climate change documentary “3 X Arctic - The Alert of the Ice” for the streaming platform GloboPlay, joined by the same original crew that went to the Inuit village of Qaanaaq in 1995 and 2007: the cinematographer Marco Antonio Gonçalves and Canadian guide Jim Allan.

== Personal life ==
Paglia has 3 children and is married to television journalist Sandra Annenberg.
