= Glória Maria =

Brazilian journalist and television host (1949–2023)

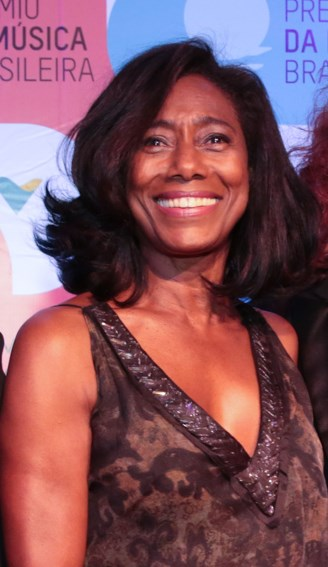
- Glória Maria in 2014
- Born: Glória Maria Matta da Silva; 15 August 1949; Rio de Janeiro, Brazil
- Died: 2 February 2023 (aged 73); Rio de Janeiro, Brazil
- Education: Pontifical Catholic University of Rio de Janeiro
- Occupations: Journalist, reporter, TV host
- Years active: 1971–2023
- Organization: TV Globo
- Notable work: Fantástico (1998–2007); Globo Repórter (2010–2023)
- Children: 2

Glória Maria Matta da Silva (15 August 1949 – 2 February 2023) was a Brazilian journalist, reporter, and television host. With a career that spanned since the 1960s, she is widely considered the first television reporter and TV host of African descent to achieve national success in Brazil.

In 2023, Parque das Ruínas in the Santa Teresa neighborhood of Rio de Jeniero was officially renamed Glória Maria Municipal Park in her honor.

== Early life ==
Glória Maria grew up in a low-income household in the suburbs of Rio de Janeiro; her father worked as a tailor and her mother as a housewife.

She lived with her grandmother after her parents divorced and was told her stories about her great-grandfather, who was hanged in the mountains of Minas Gerais state. Daughter of an enslaved mother, her grandmother was also a beneficiary of the 1871 Law of Free Birth and was thus born free. Her grandmother taught her that she needed to work to be free.

== Career ==
In January 1970, Gloria Maria met with the news directors of Globo TV, and shortly after became the special reporter for Globo Repórter, sometimes co-presenting alongside Sergio Chapelin. Glória Maria was the first black television reporter in Brazil, the first to present the seven o’clock news, and the first to command Fantástico. She had to face many barriers and obstacles to become a successful journalist and reporter.

For one year, Glória Maria worked two jobs, including weekends, before she acquired a position at Globo. She would start her shift at Globo at 8:00 a.m. and would leave at 8:00 p.m. Afterwards, she would attend pre-college prep courses and then go home to sleep for an hour. Glória Maria would wake up in the morning to go to her job at a telephone company.

She received her degree in journalism from the Pontifical Catholic University of Rio de Janeiro. After graduating, she went on to presenting news on several Globo TV programs such as RJTV, Jornal Nacional, and Fantástico. Soon after, she became known for reports that she would do while traveling to exotic places such as the Sahara Desert, and even covering events like the Falklands War in 1982. She hosted Fantastico for ten years and took a two year sabbatical to travel to places such as the Himalayas before returning and taking the second position as a Globo reporter. She accumulated more than ten complete passports throughout her life and interviewed several celebrities, such as Michael Jackson, Madonna, and Freddie Mercury.

== Personal life ==
She was married but later separated because she and her spouse did not want to live together. She did not consider having children but later became a single mother to her daughters Laura and Maria whom she adopted as sisters from Salvador, Bahia in 2009.

=== Death ===
She died on 2 February 2023, in Rio de Janeiro as a consequence of a metastatic cancer that started in her lungs and spread to her brain. She was aged 73.

Her life and career are depicted in the 2025 television documentary miniseries Gloria.

== Philanthropy ==
Maria saw children in need during many of her travels and decided to dedicate her time to travel around the world helping others. She spent time in India volunteering to help care for and feed children and beggars in the country's poorest cities. She also served children in poor areas of Nigeria. She continued her efforts when returning to Brazil and met her daughters.
