= Poliana =

Poliana may refer to:

== Genus ==
- Poliana (moth), a genus of moths in the family Sphingidae

== People ==
- Poliana Abritta, a Brazilian journalist
- Poliana Barbosa Medeiros, known as Poliana (footballer), a Brazilian footballer
- Poliana Botelho, a Brazilian mixed martial artist
- Poliana Okimoto, a Brazilian long-distance swimmer
