= Maju Coutinho =

Brazilian journalist, television presenter, and commentator

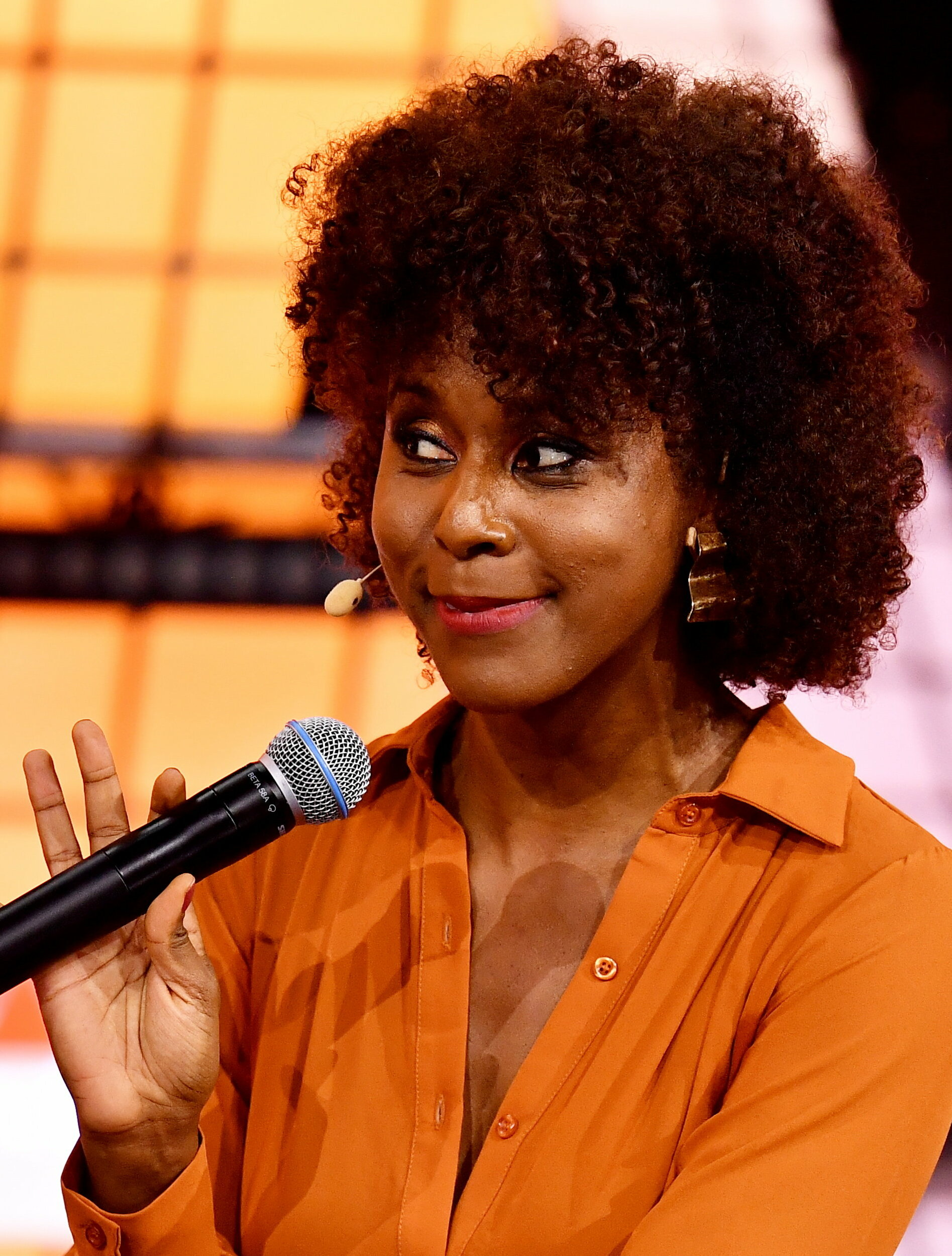
- Coutinho in 2023
- Born: Maria Júlia dos Santos Coutinho; 10 August 1978 (age 48); São Paulo, Brazil
- Education: Cásper Líbero College
- Occupation: Journalist
- Years active: 2005–present
- Spouse: Agostinho Paulo Moura (m. 2010)

Maria Júlia "Maju" dos Santos Coutinho Moura (born 10 August 1978) is a Brazilian journalist, television presenter, and commentator.

== Biography ==
Coutinho holds a degree in journalism from Faculdade Cásper Líbero and was a trainee at Fundação Padre Anchieta, where she went through various positions until she became a reporter.

In 2005, she started presenting the Jornal da Cultura with Heródoto Barbeiro. Later, she was transferred to the Cultura Meio-Dia television news show, which she presented with Laila Dawa and Vladir Lemos. In 2007, she moved to Rede Globo where she initially returned to the reports.

In 2013, Coutinho was successful as a meteorology presenter and became the holder of the station, eventually presenting the climatic forecasts of Jornal Hoje and Jornal Nacional. It also covered the weather forecasts for Hora Um da Notícia and Bom Dia Brasil, being replaced by Izabella Camargo.

In April 2015, she was displaced for the live presentation of the weather forecast of Jornal Nacional. In 2015, she became part of the SPTV (pt) host family. In January 2016 was chosen by the team of the newspaper O Globo like personality of the year in the category Segundo caderno/+TV. In March 2016, Maju received the Faz Diferença award. On June 10, 2017, she took over as the occasional presenter of Jornal Hoje.

== Career ==
Year	Title	Function	TV station
2005–06	Jornal da Cultura	Main	TV Cultura
2006–07	Cultura Meio-Dia	Main	TV Cultura
2007–12	Various TV news	Reporter	Rede Globo
2013–14	Globo Rural	Weather forecast	Rede Globo
2013–15	Bom Dia São Paulo	Weather forecast	Rede Globo
2013–15	Bom Dia Brasil	Weather forecast	Rede Globo
2014–15	Hora Um da Notícia	Weather forecast	Rede Globo
2014–15	Jornal Hoje	Weather forecast	Rede Globo
2014–present	Jornal Nacional	Weather forecast	Rede Globo
2015–present	SPTV	Weather forecast	Rede Globo
2016–present	Criança Esperança	Presenter of the Mesão da Esperança	Rede Globo
2017–2019	Jornal Hoje	Main Eventual	Rede Globo
2019–2021	Jornal Nacional	Main Eventual	Rede Globo
2019–2021	Fantástico	Main Eventual	Rede Globo
2019–present	Jornal Hoje	Presenter	Rede Globo
2021–present	Fantástico	Presenter	Rede Globo

== Controversies ==
On July 3, 2015, Maria Júlia Coutinho came to be the target of racist comments. The hashtag #SomostodosMaju (#WeAreAllMaju) had wide repercussions in social networks and the case was exposed in the Jornal Nacional by the anchors William Bonner and Renata Vasconcellos in her own presence.

== Awards ==
Year	Award	Category	Results	References
2015	Troféu Observatório da Televisão	Best Girl in Weather Forecast	Won	
2016	Troféu Observatório da Televisão	Best Girl in Weather Forecast	Won	
