= Jornal da Globo =

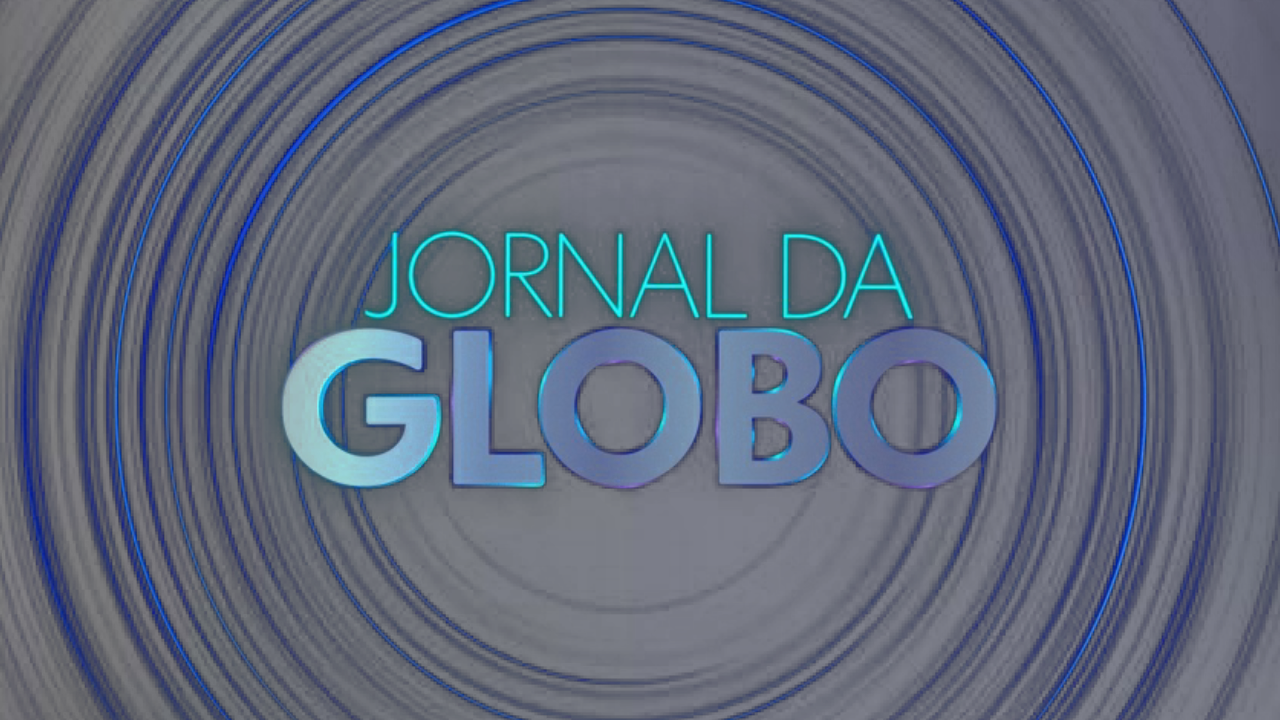
- Current logo
- Genre: News
- Created by: Jornalismo Globo
- Directed by: Ricardo Vilella; Miguel Athayde
- Presented by: Renata Lo Prete
- Country of origin: Brazil
- Original language: Portuguese

Production
- Producers: Clarissa Cavalcanti; Carolina Lauriano
- Production location: São Paulo
- Running time: 50 minutes

Original release
- Network: TV Globo
- Release: 4 March 1967 – 30 March 1969
- Release: 2 April 1979 – 6 March 1981
- Release: 2 August 1982 – present

Related
- Jornal Nacional (1981-1982, second edition)

Jornal da Globo (abbreviated as JG) is the late night news show broadcast by the Brazilian television channel TV Globo. It does not have a fixed starting time, but usually airs at or after midnight, Monday to Friday.

Hosted by Renata Lo Prete it shows a detailed summary of the news of the day, highlighting matters such as Brazilian and world's economics and politics. It's eventually hosted by José Roberto Buriner e Bruno Tavares

Jornal da Globo was originally launched in 1967 as replacement for Tele Globo as TV Globo's first newscast, hosted by Hilton Gomes and Luiz Jatobá. Its first incarnation ended in March 1969 just months before the launch of Jornal Nacional. Jornal da Globo was relaunched for a second time in 1979 and hosted by Sérgio Chapelin, ending again in 1981, replaced by a second edition of Jornal Nacional before being relaunched for a third time in its current incarnation in 1982.

== Presenter ==
- Renata Lo Prete

Relief presenter

Commentators

- Julia Dualibi - politics and economy
- Leo Lepri - sports

== Ex-holders ==
=== 1st fase (1967-1969) ===
- Hilton Gomes (1967 - 1969)
- Luiz Jatobá (1967 - 1969)

=== 2nd fase (1979-1981) ===
- Sérgio Chapelin (1979 - 1981)

=== 3rd fase (1982-present) ===
- Renato Machado (1982 - 1983)
- Belisa Ribeiro (1982 - 1983)
- Luciana Villas Boas (1982 - 1983)
- Leilane Neubarth (1983 - 1986)
- Eliakim Araújo (1983 - 1989)
- Leila Cordeiro (1986 - 1989)
- William Bonner (1989 - 1992)
- Fátima Bernardes (1989 - 1992)
- Lilian Witte Fibe (1993 - 1996/1998 - 2000)
- Monica Waldvogel (1996 - 1997)
- Sandra Annenberg (1997 - 1998)
- Carlos Tramontina (2000)
- Ana Paula Padrão (2000 - 2005)
- Chico Pinheiro (2005)
- Cristiane Pelajo (2005 - 2015)
- William Waack (2005 - 2017)

== Former relief presenters ==
- Celso Freitas (1982–1990)
- Leda Nagle (1982–1989)
- Eliakim Araújo (1982–1983)
- Marcus Hummel (1985–1993)
- Augusto Xavier (1986–1994)
- Fátima Bernardes (1987–1989)
- Lilian Witte Fibe (1988–1993)
- William Bonner (1988–1989)
- Monica Waldvogel (1992-1996 and 1999)
- Cristina Ranzolin (1993)
- Sandra Annenberg (1993–1997)
- Mona Dorf (1998–1999)
- Carlos Tramontina (1997-2000/2017-2022)
- Chico Pinheiro (2000–2005)
- William Waack (2000–2005)
- Carlos Alberto Sardenberg (2012–2014)
- Poliana Abritta (2012–2014)
- Zileide Silva (2014)
- Renata Lo Prete (2015–2017)
- Márcio Gomes (2019–2020)
- Roberto Kovalick (2020)
- José Roberto Buriner desde 2022

== See also ==
- TV Globo
