= List of programs broadcast by Record =

Record TV Programming - April 21, 2014, a Brazilian television network.

== Current programs ==
=== News ===
- Balanço Geral (2007–present)
- Cidade Alerta (1995–2005; 2011; 2012–present)
- Domingo Espetacular (2004–present)
- Fala Brasil (1990–1993; 1998–present)
- Jornal da Record (1974–present)
- Patrulha das Fronteiras (2023–present)
- DOC: Investigação (2024–present)

=== Sports ===
- Aquecimento Futebol (2025-present)
- Esporte Record (2000-2001; 2004-2007; 2022; 2025-present)

=== Telenovelas ===
- Iludida (2026-present)
- Reis (rerun; 2024-present)
- Jesus (rerun; 2024-present)

=== International series ===
- Chicago Fire (2014-present)
- Chicago P.D. (2015-present)
- Chicago Med (2018-present)

=== Reality shows ===
Title	Presenter	Run
A Fazenda (The Farm)	Adriane Galisteu	2009–present
A Grande Conquista	Mariana Rios; Rachel Sheherazade	2023–2024
Top Chef Brasil (Top Chef)	Felipe Bronze	2019–2023
Canta Comigo (All Together Now)	Rodrigo Faro	2018–2024
Canta Comigo Teen (All Together Now)	Rodrigo Faro	2020–2024
Troca de Esposas (Wife Swap)	Ticiane Pinheiro	2019–2023
Vai Dar Namoro - (Hora do Faro)	Rodrigo Faro	2009–2024
Famosas em Apuros - (Hora do Faro)	Rodrigo Faro	2021–2024
Pronto Pra Fama - (Hora do Faro)	Rodrigo Faro	2023–2024
Casais em Apuros	Rodrigo Faro	2023–2024
Ilha Record (similar format Desafío)	Mariana Rios	2021–2022
Game dos Clones (Game of Clones)	Sabrina Sato	2020
Hair: O Reality dos Cabelos (Hair)	Ana Hickmann	2020
The Four Brasil (The Four)	Xuxa Meneghel	2019–2020
Bancando o Chef - (Hoje em Dia)	Dalton Rangel	2018-2020
Dancing Brasil (Dancing with the Stars)	Xuxa Meneghel	2017–2019
A Casa (Get The F*ck Out Of My House)	Marcos Mion	2017
Power Couple (זוג מנצח VIP)	Felipe Andreoli; Rafa Brites	2016–2022, 2025–present
Batalha dos Cozinheiros (Next Great Baker)	Buddy Valastro	2016
Batalha dos Confeiteiros (Next Great Baker)	Buddy Valastro	2015–2018
Me Leva Contigo (Taken Out)	Rafael Cortez	2014
Got Talent Brasil (Got Talent)	Rafael Cortez	2013
Ídolos Kids (Idols Kids)	Marcos Mion	2012–2013
Top Model, o Reality	Ana Hickmann	2012
Amazônia	Victor Fasano	2012
A Casa da Ana Hickmann	Ana Hickmann	2011
Extreme Makeover Social (Extreme Makeover)	various	2010-2012
Ídolos (Idols)	Marcos Mion	2008–2013
Brazil's Next Top Model	Ana Hickmann	2007–2009
Simple Life: Mudando de Vida (The Simple Life)	Karina Bacchi; Ticiane Pinheiro	2007
Troca de Família (Trading Spouses)	various	2006-2016
O Aprendiz (The Apprentice)	Roberto Justus; João Doria Jr.	2004–2014
Sem Saída (Captive)	Márcio Garcia	2004
Quilos Mortais (My 600-lb Life)	Celso Zucatelli	2022–present
Casa do Patrão	Leandro Hassum	2026–present

=== Varieties and game shows ===
Title	Presenter	Run
Hoje em Dia Parts: Além do Peso (Cuestión de peso) (2013–2015)	Ana Hickmann; César Filho; Renata Alves; Ticiane Pinheiro	2005–present
Hora do Faro Parts: Paredão dos Famosos (Hollywood Squares); Isso Eu Faço (I Can Do That); Topa um Acordo? (Let's Make a Deal) (2014)	Rodrigo Faro	2014–2024
Domingo Record	Rachel Sheherazade	2024
Acerte Ou Caia (Who's Still Standing?)	Tom Cavalcante	2024–present
Boom! (Boom!)	Tom Cavalcante	2026
Game dos Games (Game of Games)	Rodrigo Faro	2021 (cancelled)
Gincana da Grana	Sabrina Sato	2021
Made In Japão (I Survived a Japanese Game Show)	Sabrina Sato	2020
Muro dos Famosos (Wall of Fame) - (Legendários)	Marcos Mion	2017
Desafio Musical (Name That Tune)	Gugu Liberato	2013
O Preço Certo (The Price Is Right)	Juan Alba	2009–2010
Gugu bate em sua porta (Opportunity Knocks)	Gugu Liberato	2009
Distração Fatal (Distraction)	Rodrigo Faro	2008
O Jogador (PokerFace)	Ana Hickmann; Britto Junior	2007–2008
Game Show de Verão	Celso Cavallini; Kelly Key	2009–2012
Roleta Russa (Russian Roulette)	Milton Neves	2002–2003
Domingo Show (Game Show)	Gilberto Barros	2000–2002
Adivinhe o que ele Faz? (What's My Line?)	Blota Junior	1953-1956

=== Children's programs ===
- Desenhos Bíblicos (2019–present)
- Everybody Hates Chris (2005-present)
- My Wife and Kids (2024-present)

=== Film ===
- Cine Aventura (1993–present)
- Cine Record Especial (1990–present)
- Cine Maior (2007; 2011–2012; 2013; 2020–present)
- Super Tela (1990–present)

=== Sports championships ===
- Campeonato Brasileiro (1985, 2002-2006, 2025-present)
- Campeonato Paulista (2002-2006, 2022-present)

=== Religious ===
- Programação IURD (1991–present)
- Fala que Eu Te Escuto (1998–present)
- The Love School (2011–present)

=== Independent programming ===
- Brasil Caminhoneiro (2020–present)

== Former programs ==
=== Variety ===
- 12 Mulheres (2009–2010)
- 50 por 1 (2007–2014)
- Almoço com as Estrelas (1980–1981)
- As Maiores Curiosidades do Mundo (2005–2006)
- Domingo da Gente (2001–2006; 2013–2014)
- Domingo Show (2000-2002; 2014–2020)
- E aí, Doutor? (2011–2012)
- Especial Sertanejo (1983–2000)
- O Fino da Bossa (1965–1967)
- Geraldo Brasil (2009; 2017)
- Gugu (2015–2017)
- Guiness: O Mundo dos Recordes (2005)
- Hebe (1966–1973)
- Jovem Guarda (1965–1968)
- Kliptonita (1990–1993)
- Leão Livre (1998–1999)
- Legendários (2010–2017)
- O Melhor do Brasil (2005–2014)
- Mixturação (1973–1974)
- A Noite É Nossa (2002–2004; 2021)
- Note e Anote (1991–2005)
- Perdidos na Noite (1984–1986)
- Perfil (1991–1992)
- Programa Ana Maria Braga (1996–1999)
- Programa da Sabrina (2014–2019)
- Programa da Tarde (2006–2009; 2012–2015)
- Programa do Gugu (2009–2013)
- Programa do Porchat (2016–2018)
- Programa Ferreira Netto (1977–1981; 1988–1992; 1993–1994)
- Programa Raul Gil (1973–1978; 1980–1981; 1984–1986; 1998–2005)
- Programa Silvio Santos (1980–1987)
- Quarta Total (1999–2002)
- Ratinho Livre (1997–1998)
- Ratinho Show (1997–1998)
- Raul Gil Tamanho Família (2002)
- Roberto Justus + (2012–2016)
- É Show (2000–2004)
- Show 713 (1958–1962)
- Sinal de Vida (1991–1992)
- Sônia é Você (2004–2006)
- Tudo É Possível (2005–2012)
- Verdade do Povo (2003–2004)
- Xuxa Meneghel (2015–2016)

=== Children's programs ===
- Atchim & Cia (1990–1991)
- Casa Mágica (1990–1992)
- Chocolate Para Crianças (1983-1987)
- Desenho Mania (1998–2004)
- Desenho Maravilha (1997–1998)
- Domingo Criança (1995–1998)
- Domingo no Parque (1980–1987)
- Eliana & Alegria (1998–2003)
- Eliana (2004)
- Eliana na Fábrica Maluca (2003–2004)
- Eliana no Parque (1999–2000)
- Grande Gincana Kibon (1955–1971)
- Mara Maravilha Show (1996–1997)
- Mundo Maravilha (1997)
- Os Amigos Vegetais (2005)
- Pintando o Sete (1988–1990)
- Programa Pullman Junior (1953–1969)
- Tati Bi Tati (1992–1994)
- Tarde Criança (1995–1996)
- The Alvin Show (1969)
- A Turma do Sete (1960–1965)
- Woody Woodpecker (2006–2024)

=== Comedy ===
- Escolinha do Barulho (1999–2001)
- Escolinha do Gugu (2011–2013)
- Show do Tom (2004–2011)

=== News ===
- Boletim R7 (2019–2020)
- Brasília Ao Vivo (1993-1994)
- Câmera em Ação (2012)
- Câmera Record (2008 2007
- Coronavírus - Plantão (2020)
- Direto da Redação (2003-2004; 2009–2011)
- Disque Record (1998–1999)
- Edição da Noite (2003)
- Edição de Notícias (2003–2006)
- Em Nome da Justiça (2020)
- Informe Praça (1993–2005)
- Heróis Eternos (2024)
- Jornal 24 Horas (2006–2007)
- Jornal da Record: Segunda Edição (1990–1992; 1999–2003)
- Jornal Onze e Meia (1997–1999)
- Mappin Movietone (1953–1965)
- O Homem do Tempo (1965–1975)
- Passando a Limpo (1997–2003)
- Pesca & Companhia (2000–2001)
- Praça no Ar (2004–2019)
- Questão de Opinião (2001-2002)
- Record Economia (1988-1990)
- Record em Notícias (1973–1996)
- Record Notícias (2009–2012)
- Praça Record (2005-2012; 2017-2018)
- Repórter em Ação (2015–2017)
- Repórter Esso (1953–1970)
- Repórter Record (1995–2012; 2014–2016; 2020–2025)
- Testemunha da História (2001)
- Tudo a Ver (2004–2009; 2010–2012; 2013; 2014)

=== Sports ===
- 7 no Pique (1993-1995)
- Clube dos Esportistas (1982–1986)
- Com a Bola Toda (1996-1998; 2002)
- Debate Bola (2001–2008)
- Esporte Fantástico (2009–2020)
- Filmando a Rodada (1986)
- Geração Esporte (1990-1991)
- Minuto Olímpico (2009-2016)
- Minuto do Pan (2007–2015)
- Momento Esportivo Gillette (1994)
- Olho no Lance (1978-1986)
- Record Esportivo (1991-1992)
- Record na Jogada (1993-1995)
- Record nos Esportes (1982-1988; 1992-1993; 1995–1996; 2002–2004)
- Sport Shopping Show (1990-1991)
- Super Esporte (1990)
- Terceiro Tempo (2001–2007)
- Tom de Bola (2005–2006)
- Vídeo Gol (2006-2007)

=== Religious ===
- 25ª Hora (1992–1998)
- O Despertar da Fé (1989–2007)

=== Movie blocks ===
- Bang Bang a Italiana (1977–1990)
- Campeões de Audiência (1990–2003)
- Cine Avon (2008–2009)
- Cine Fantasia (1985–1990)
- Cine Record (1990–1994; 2003–2007; 2013–2019)
- Cine Record Visa (2003–2007)
- Cinema Aventura (1982–1985)
- Cinema como no Cinema (1982–1983; 1985)
- Cinema Sempre Cinema (1979–1988)
- Cinerama (1980–1981)
- Color 7 (1977–1981)
- Domingo Aventura (2009–2010)
- Especial do Mês (1979–1990)
- Festival Bang-Bang (1990)
- Festival de Outono (1990)
- Longa-Metragem (1983–1990; 1993–1994)
- Poltrona R (1977–1989)
- Primeira Fila (1981–1989)
- Primeira Sessão (1990-1992)
- Quadra se Ases (1982; 1987–1990)
- Quarta em Ação (1988)
- Quarta Especial (1996–1997)
- Quinta Nobre (1992–1993)
- Sábado Aventura (2007–2009)
- Sala Especial (1981–1988)
- Segunda Especial (1997)
- Sempre aos Domingos (1972–1990)
- Sequência Máxima (1985–1987)
- Sessão Bang-Bang (1976–1990; 1991–1995; 1996–1998)
- Sessão Calafrio (1979–1984)
- Sessão Colt-45 (1988–1990)
- Sessão Crime e Castigo (1981)
- Sessão da Madrugada (1981–1989)
- Sessão das Nove (1979–1980)
- Sessão de Domingo (1995–2006)
- Sessão de Férias (2001–2004)
- Sessão de Sábado (1976–1980; 1990–1999)
- Sessão dos Executivos (1974–1985)
- Sessão Especial (1981–2009)
- Sessão Família (1996–1998)
- Sessão Ficção Científica (1981)
- Sessão Fim de Noite (1982–1984)
- Sessão Nobre (1978–1979)
- Sessão Oscar (1974–1989)
- Sessão Transnoite (1991–1996; 1997; 1998–2005)
- Show de Cinema (1990)
- Super Quinta (1992–1993)
- Tarde Maior (1991–1996)
- Tela Máxima (1999–2022)
- Tela Nova (1998–2000)
- Teverama (1976–1989)
- Top Movie (1989–1990)
- Vídeo Set (1988–1989)
- Última Sessão (1990–1991)

=== Sports championships ===
- 1984 Summer Olympics
- 1986 FIFA World Cup
- 1996 Summer Olympics
- 1998 FIFA World Cup
- UEFA Euro 2004
- UEFA Euro 2008
- UEFA Champions League (1995-1996, 2006-2009)
- UEFA Cup (1996-1997, 2006-2009)
- UEFA Supercup (2006-2008)
- 2007 Pan American Games
- 2010 Winter Olympics
- 2010 South American Games
- 2010 World Figure Skating Championships
- 2010 Summer Youth Olympics
- 2011 Pan American Games
- 2012 Summer Olympics
- 2014 Winter Olympics
- 2014 South American Games
- 2015 Pan American Games
- 2016 Summer Olympics
- 2019 Pan American Games
- Torneio Rio-São Paulo (2002)
- Campeonato Carioca (1996-1997, 2021-2022)
- Campeonato Catarinense (2007-2009)
- Campeonato Baiano (2007-2009)
- Campeonato Brasileiro Série B
- Copa do Brasil (2002-2006)
- Copa Sudamericana (2003-2006)
- International Champions Cup (2018-1019)
- Campeonato Cearense
- Campeonato Sergipano (TV Atalaia)
- Campeonato Potiguar (TV Tropical)
- Campeonato Paranaense
- Campeonato Maranhense
- Campeonato Alagoano
- Campeonato Acreano
- Campeonato Brasiliense
- Campeonato Roraimense (TV Imperial)
- Campeonato Tocantinense
- Bundesliga (1995-1996)
- Serie A (1995-1996)
- La Liga (1996-1997)
- FA Cup (1995-1996)
- Italian Cup (1995-1996)
- J1 League (1996)
- J.League Cup (1996)
- CART
- Formula Ford
- Formula 3 Sudamericana
- Brazilian Volleyball Superleague
- Tennis
- Basketball
