= Globo Repórter =

Brazilian television series

- Genre: News program
- Created by: Boni
- Directed by: Silvia Sayão; Ricardo Villela; Miguel Athayde; Márcio Sternick (RJ); Ana Escalada (SP); Luiz Fernando Ávila (DF); Virgílio Gruppi (MG); Angélica Tasso (PE)
- Presented by: William Bonner; Sandra Annenberg
- Narrated by: Sandra Annenberg; Fábio Katscui; Ilze Scamparini; Renata Ceribelli
- Opening theme: "Freedom of Expression (Instrumental version)" by J.B. Pickers
- Ending theme: Diversos
- Country of origin: Brazil
- Original language: Portuguese

Production
- Running time: 60 minutes

Original release
- Network: TV Globo
- Release: April 3, 1973 – present

Globo Repórter is a Brazilian weekly documentary television show broadcast by TV Globo, on Fridays at 10pm ever since its premiere in 1973. It was formerly premiered in 1971, as Globo-Shell Especial.

The show addresses issues related to the Brazilian way of life, highlighting matters such as health, education, work and nature.

== History ==
Globo Repórter, as we know it today, was formed from the idea of creating a news program similar to 60 Minutes from CBS News. However, as Rede Globo did not have the structure to produce a program primarily consisting of location shoots, it chose to adopt the model of the extinct Globo Shell Especial and produce film documentaries with background narration by the presenter.

== Presenters ==
=== Main hosts ===
- Sérgio Chapelin (1973–1983; 1986–1989; 1996–2019)
- Berto Filho (1983–1986)
- Celso Freitas (1989–1996)
- Glória Maria (2010–2022)
- Sandra Annenberg (since 2019)
- William Bonner (since 2026)

=== Co-hosts ===
- Berto Filho (1973–1982; 1987–1989)
- Celso Freitas (1977–1983; 1996–2004)
- Carlos Campbell (1980–1989)
- Eliakim Araújo (1983–1989)
- Renato Machado (1996–1999)
- Alexandre Garcia (1999–2009)
- César Tralli (2008–2009)
- Heraldo Pereira (2008–2010)
- Alan Severiano (2009)

== See also ==
- Globo Network
