= Poliana Abritta =

Brazilian journalist (born 1975)

- Born: Poliana Abritta Martins Ferreira; September 18, 1975 (age 50); Brasília, Federal District, Brazil
- Occupations: Journalist; Anchor
- Years active: 1997–present

Poliana Abritta Martins Ferreira (September 18, 1975) is a Brazilian journalist and news presenter. She is a reporter and presenter for TV Globo.

Between 2012 and 2013, she became a presenter on the Globo Mar chain. Before moving to New York City, the journalist was a member of the team Jornal Hoje before going on maternity leave. Since 2014, Abritta has been one of the presenters of the news programme Fantástico.

== TV news ==
- Globo Mar (2012 - 2013)
- Fantástico (until 2014).

=== Presenter eventual ===
- Jornal Hoje: (2011 – 2014)
- Jornal da Globo: (2012 – 2014)
- Bom Dia Brasil (2010 – 2012)
