= César Tralli =

Brazilian newscaster and journalist (born 1970)

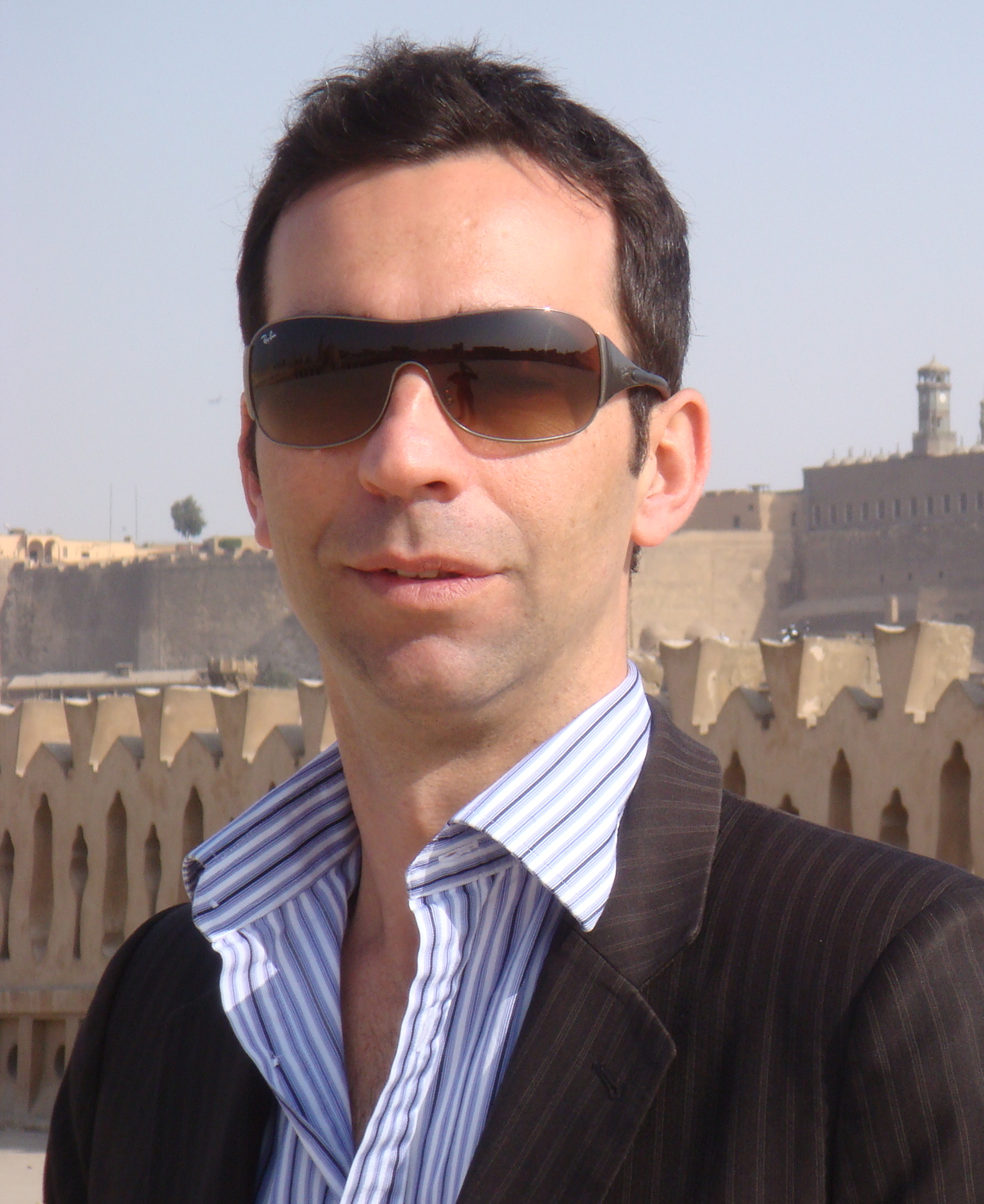
- Born: César Augusto Tralli Júnior; 23 December 1970 (age 55)
- Education: Cásper Líbero College Pontifical Catholic University of São Paulo
- Occupations: Journalist, anchor
- Years active: 1990–present
- Spouses: Cássia Ávila (m. 2006–2007) Flávia Freire (m. 2007–2013) Ticiane Pinheiro (m. 2017)

César Augusto Tralli Júnior (born 23 December 1970) is a Brazilian newscaster and journalist. He is the anchorman of Jornal Nacional since 2025. He presented SPTV - 1st Edition for ten years, and for five years simultaneously presented Jornal Hoje and Jornal GloboNews - 6pm Edition.
