= Jornal da Record =

- Genre: News
- Created by: Grupo Record
- Directed by: Antonio Guerreiro
- Presented by: Celso Freitas; Christina Lemos
- Country of origin: Brazil
- Original language: Portuguese

Production
- Running time: 60 minutes (Monday to Friday); 45 minutes (Saturday)

Original release
- Network: Record
- Release: September 24, 1974 – present

Related
- Xecap

Jornal da Record (Brazilian Portuguese: [ʒoʁˈnaw dɐ ʁeˈkɔʁ]; Portuguese(also known by the acronym JR) is a nighttime Brazilian television news program, produced and presented by RecordTV. It is the station's main news program, shown daily from Monday to Friday at 8 pm.

The television news coverage of the main events in Brazil and in the world, the production of special and investigative reports. It has reporters in all states of Brazil, through Record affiliates, and also has international correspondents in its offices located in the United States (New York and Washington D.C.), Europe (London and Lisbon), Asia (Tokyo) and the Middle East (Jerusalem). Jornal da Record is also presented by Record Internacional, reaching more than 150 countries.

Outstanding awards are including Esso Award, Trophy Press, Vladimir Herzog Award and APCA Award.

== History ==
Jornal da Record was premiered on September 24, 1974, as replacement for Xecap (based on Xecap 1000, a radio news program on Rádio Record), and hosted by Hélio Ansaldo. In 1976, the program was renamed as Jornal da Noite.

In 1985, Jornal da Noite renamed again as Jornal da Record, presented by Ricardo Carvalho, with reporters comments are Celso Ming and Paulo Markun, with reporting by Sílvia Poppovic. In 1988, Ricardo Carvalho was replaced by José Nello Marques. In 1989, Jornal da Record was presented by Carlos Nascimento, who was the editor-in-chief at the time and anchor of the attraction. The news program was also presented by Wellington de Oliveira and Amália Rocha. The REI had a modest structure at the time and was on the verge of bankruptcy, but even so the television news was a hit with the opinion-forming public and was 2 hours long. Jornal da Record was broadcast on São Paulo, Rio de Janeiro, Curitiba, Porto Alegre, and Brasília.

Nascimento remained until 1990 at the station, when he returned to Rede Globo. Maria Lydia Flândoli took over as presenter of the newscast that from 1990 to 1993 had two editions: regional with local news and national news with national and international news and remained as presenter until 1991, when Salette Lemos went on to present the program, It was also presented by Ênnio Pesce and Kátia Maranhão, comments were by Lucas Mendes (international) and Kitty Balieiro (sports). The following year, Carlos Bianchini, coming from the Rede Manchete, takes the attraction and starts to divide the bench with Adriana de Castro, leaving the presentation in 1994. It was then replaced by Carlos Oliveira, who shared the presentation of the television news with Adriana de Castro until March 1996. In 1995, Chico Pinheiro, who was from Rede Bandeirantes, took over the program. In the short time that he presented the television news, Chico got involved in controversies with the owners of the station, accusing them of censorship, the comments of Adriana de Castro (direct from Rio de Janeiro), Antônio Augusto (direct from Brasília), Marcelo Pontes (politics), Bernardo Carvalho (international) and Luiz Nassif (economy). In replacement, Adriana de Castro became the sole anchor until June 1997, when Bóris Casoy left SBT and TJ Brasil and signed a contract with Rede Record.

In December 2005, Casoy was fired from the broadcaster on the grounds that it was no longer in compliance with Record journalism standards. Casoy retaliated, saying he had been fired under pressure from the PT. In its place, Heleine Heringer, the former weather newscast host in the time of Boris, temporarily took over as news anchor.

On January 30, 2006, just few months after the resignation of Boris Casoy, the new "Jornal da Record" was launched, presented by Celso Freitas and Adriana Araújo, which had a slight editorial reform, making it more wide and with the presence of a new team of reporters in a total of 15 coming from Rede Globo, since in 2005 the station had lost the same number of reporters to the team formation of the recently released SBT Brasil.

On May 7, 2009, Record announced in an official communication the hiring of journalist Ana Paula Padrão for four years. Ana Paula, who previously working for Globo and SBT, has presented the new "Jornal da Record" with Celso Freitas since June 29, replacing Adriana Araújo, who becomes the new correspondent for the station in New York.

While Ana Paula Padrão had not yet debuted, Janine Borba temporarily took over the television newsstand alongside Marcos Hummel. The newscast was being presented in chroma key, due to the reforms in the newsroom's writing, for the debut of the "new" Jornal da Record and other programs such as the Fala Brasil and the journalistic Câmera Record.

On June 29, 2009, the program went on the air again, with Celso Freitas and Ana Paula Padrão. From September 27, 2010, the program began broadcasting in HD.

On November 1, 2010, Ana Paula Padrão and Adriana Araujo interviewed for the JR, Dilma Rousseff, who, the day before, had come out victorious from the polls for the first term of president of Brazil. The interview was Dilma's first after the victory, and was also more than exclusive; since the end of the military regime, no democratically elected president had given an interview to another station other than Rede Globo.

On July 11, 2011, the newscast began to be presented at 19:40, coming out of the direct confrontation with the Jornal Nacional. During October 2011, Record transmitted the Pan American Games in Guadalajara, and Jornal da Record has to be presented at 18.20; with Ana Paula Padrão and the staff assembled in Guadalajara bringing the news of the day of the competition, and, Celso Freitas in São Paulo presenting a summary of the news from Brazil and the world. After the end of the transmissions of the multi-sport event held in Guadalajara, Mexico, the television news was re-presented at 8:30 p.m., again confronting the Jornal Nacional.

Record ended gradually with the rotation of presenters on Saturdays in Jornal da Record. It started from February 11, 2012, when Eduardo Ribeiro became effective in presenting JR the last day of the week, ending the rotation of male anchors. Later, it was the turn of the end of the rotation of female anchors; on January 12, 2013 the journalist Carla Cecato became double with Eduardo Ribeiro on Saturdays, but left the function to return to the Foreign Brazil in early 2014. Janine Borba, Thalita Oliveira and Adriana Araújo occupy the position.

On March 20, 2013, Ana Paula Padrão presented for the last time JR. She canceled the contract signed in 2009 that would have another month. Journalist Adriana Araújo, who preceded Ana Paula in the women's presentation of Jornal da Record, was effective and rejoined with Celso Freitas on March 26, 2013.

On March 23, 2015, Jornal da Record went to the late opening of 20:30. The station is criticized for broadcasting the news after all the other major networks on prime time. On November 18, 2015, R7, Record's journalism portal, an online version for the newscast, JR Online, to be presented every Wednesday, always after the end of the issue on TV.

On September 17, 2018, after nine years, Jornal da Record gets new graphics and set, which is the new newsroom of RecordTV. On September 9, 2019, before one year, Jornal da Record gets renewed graphics and set, which is the newsroom of RecordTV.

On August 10, 2022, the main bulletin became entirely recorded, using budget cuts as context as well as a form of punishment, since some mistakes were done live, such as the lack of links between reporters and anchors and constant typos in the graphics. Such measure was also seen as a censorship attempt on behalf of RecordTV's directive, since the exclusion of reports critical of Jair Bolsonaro's was ordered, as the then-president was disputing his re-election and Republicanos, linked to the Universal Church of the Kingdom of God, was part of its coalition. After the elections, on November 1, it returned to its previous live format.

== Hosts ==
=== Main presenters ===
- Celso Freitas (since 2006)
- Christina Lemos (2020–Present)

=== Relief presenters ===
- Carla Cecato (since 2011)
- Eduardo Ribeiro (since 2012)
- Janine Borba (since 2007)
- Patrícia Costa (since 2017)
- Thalita Oliveira (since 2014)

=== Former presenters ===
- Hélio Ansaldo (1976-1985)
- Ricardo Carvalho (1985-1988)
- José Nello Marques (1988-1989)
- João Carlos Albuquerque (1989)
- Carlos Nascimento (1989-1990)
- Wellington de Oliveira Ribeiro (1989-1991)
- Lilian Fernandes (1989-1991)
- Amália Rocha (1989-1990)
- Sílvia Poppovic (1990)
- Maria Anita Jorge (1990-1992)
- Silvana Kieling (1990-1991)
- Dennis Rivera (1990-1992)
- Jaime Leibovitch (1990-1992)
- Dárcio Arruda (1990-1992)
- Beth Russo (1990-1992)
- Kátia Maranhão (1991-1992)
- Bob Floriano (1991-1992)
- Ênnio Pesce (1991-1992)
- Esther Jablonski (1991-1992)
- Maria Lydia Flândoli (1990-1992)
- Salette Lemos (1991-1992, 1997-2005)
- Carlos Bianchini (1992-1994)
- Cláudia Ribeiro (1991-1993)
- Celene Araújo (1993)
- Cássia Mello (1993)
- Eduardo Lima (1993)
- Edson Celulari (1993)
- Adriana de Castro (1992-1997)
- Carlos Oliveira (1992-1995)
- Chico Pinheiro (1995-1996)
- Cláudia Cruz (2001)
- Bóris Casoy (1997-2005)
- Heleine Heringer (2005-2006)
- Cristina Scaff (2005-2006)
- Ana Paula Padrão (2009-2013)
- Adriana Araújo (2006-2009, 2013-2020)

== See also ==
- List of programs broadcast by Record
