= Sandra Annenberg =

Brazilian newscaster

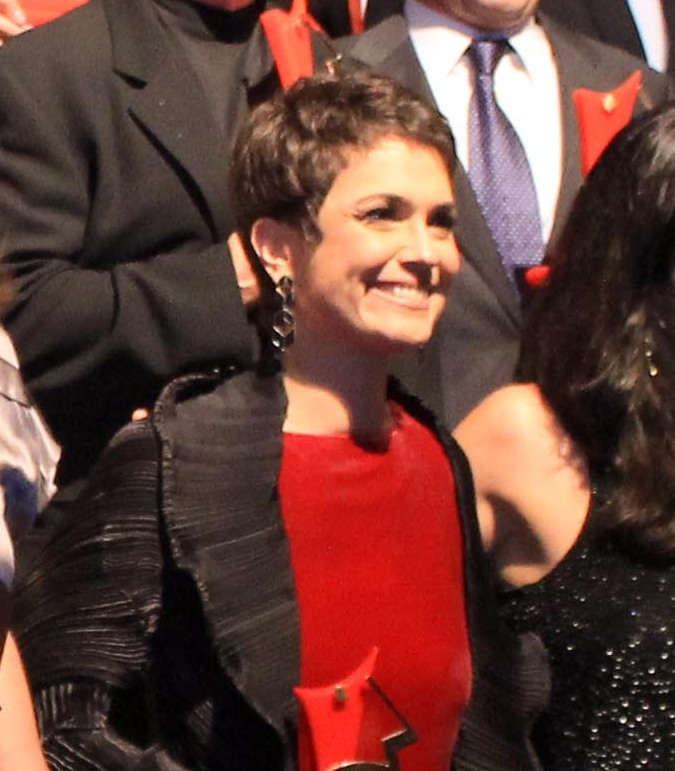
- Born: June 5, 1968 (age 58); São Paulo, Brazil
- Education: University of São Paulo; Faculdades Metropolitanas Unidas
- Occupations: Journalist and Anchor
- Years active: 1984–present
- Notable credit(s): Jornal Hoje anchor (2003–2019)
- Spouse: Ernesto Paglia
- Partner: since 1994
- Children: 1

Sandra Annenberg (born 5 June 1968, in São Paulo) is a Brazilian newscaster. Since 1982, Sandra has worked for Globo TV, the largest commercial TV network in Brazil, with over 150 million Portuguese speaking viewers in more than 130 countries.

Sandra was anchor and executive editor at the “Jornal Hoje” (“Today”) lunchtime news, the second most viewed news bulletin in Brazil until September 2019. Since then, Annenberg is the newscaster of the prestigious weekly news-documentary show "Globo Repórter", aired every Friday evening to one of the largest audiences in Brazil.

After a successful early career as an actress, she went back to college for a Journalism degree at Faculdades Metropolitanas Unidas, FMU, in São Paulo.

She has been assigned to cover many important national and international events like FIFA's World Cups in Germany-2006, South Africa-2010, Brazil-2014 and Russia-2018. She also covered the Atlanta-96 Olympic Games.

Awarded best anchorwoman in Brazil several times, she is widely recognized as one of the main TV journalists in the country.

== TV news ==
- São Paulo Já (1991–1993);
- Fantástico (1993–1996);
- SPTV 1ª Edição (1996–1997 and 2001–2003);
- Jornal da Globo (1997–1998);
- Jornal Nacional (1998);
- Jornal Hoje (1998–1999; 2003–2019 and since 2025);
- Como Será? (since 2014);
- London Correspondent, from 2000 to 2002
- Globo Repórter (September 2019 – 2025)

=== As a relief presenter ===
- Fantástico (1997–1999);
- Jornal da Globo (1991–1996 and 1999–2000);
- Jornal Nacional (1996–2000, 2002–2011 and since 2013)
- Jornal Hoje (since 2013)
