= TV Tropical =

TV Tropical (ZYB 563)
Natal, Rio Grande do Norte; Brazil
- Channels: Digital: 32 (UHF); Virtual: 8
- Branding: TV Tropical

Programming
- Affiliations: Record

Ownership
- Owner: Rede Tropical de Comunicação; (Tropical Comunicação Ltda.)
- Sister stations: CBN Natal; Mix FM Natal

History
- First air date: October 31, 1987
- Former channel numbers: Analog: 8 (VHF, 1987-2018)
- Former affiliations: Rede Manchete (1987-1997)

Technical information
- Licensing authority: ANATEL
- ERP: 3.6 kW
- Transmitter coordinates: 5°47′46.8″S 35°11′47.2″W

Links
- Public license information: Profile
- Website: portaldatropical.com.br

TV Tropical (channel 8) is a Record-affiliated television station licensed to the city of Natal, capital of the state of Rio Grande do Norte, owned by Rede Tropical de Comunicação, who also controls radio stations CBN Natal and Mix FM Natal, as well as other stations in the state's inland. Its studios are located in the Lagoa Seca neighborhood and its transmitting antenna is located at Parque das Dunas, in Tirol.

== History ==
Prior to the existence of TV Tropical, VHF channel 8 in Natal was occupied by a relayer of TV Jornal do Commercio from Recife, Pernambuco, at the time affiliated with Rede Bandeirantes, which had been installed in 1985. With the transfer of the Pernambuco station to SBT, represented in Natal by TV Ponta Negra, the relay continued with the full rebroadcasst of Rede Bandeirantes' national feed until the launch of the future occupant. TV Tropical went on air on October 31, 1987, being affiliated with Rede Manchete. Before the station went on air, politician Tarcísio Maia had already won the license for the TV generator on channel 8 from the Sarney Government and built the headquarters of the future station.

Its history has been marked from the beginning by a strong political influence on the content of its programming. Even today, entire statements by its owners, José Agripino Maia and Felipe Maia, are frequently included, as well as countless reports in which both are protagonists or participants. Articles and comments unfavorable to political opponents are also common, contradicting the legislation applicable to television concessions. In 2017, the station's shares were transferred to other family members, in order to comply with the provisions of the Brazilian Telecommunications Code.

In 1996, the station began transmitting via satellite and began expanding its signal to the inland area, currently having coverage in around 80% of the state. On November 1, 1997, Rede Manchete was replaced by Rede Record, when the Rio network showed new signs of crisis, a drop in audience and the loss of affiliates in several Brazilian cities, which would be responsible for its extinction in 1999.

The change of network head marked changes in its structure and local programming, which until then were precarious. In the journalistic segment, its programs had a significant evolution with investments after the affiliation with Record, also as a result of strong competition with the journalistic programs of InterTV Cabugi and TV Ponta Negra.

On April 16, 2024, TV Tropical hired Murilo Meireles, former presenter of RN1 on InterTV Cabugi, for the program Cidade Alerta, replacing Salatiel de Souza. Murilo returns to the station as anchor and editor.

== Technical information ==
Virtual channel	Digital channel	Screen	Content
32.1	8 UHF	1080i	TV Tropical/Record's main schedule

TV Tropical began its digital transmissions on an experimental basis in May 2011, through channel 32 UHF, and officially began its transmissions on July 10th. Without any party or ceremony, the launch took place through a small quote made during the Balanço Geral RN by presenter Tiago Dimer. The broadcaster began broadcasting its programming in high definition on May 7, 2018, and the first broadcast in the format took place during Carnatal coverage on December 1, 2015, in partnership with the production company Peron Filmes.

=== Analog-to-digital conversion ===
The station closed its analog signal on VHF channel 8 on May 30, 2018, following the official ANATEL roadmap.
