= Ilze Scamparini =

Brazilian journalist

Ilze Lia Scamparini (born 26 December 1958) is a Brazilian journalist. Today, she is the Italy and Vatican international journalist of TV Globo.
