= Fátima Bernardes =

Brazilian journalist and TV host

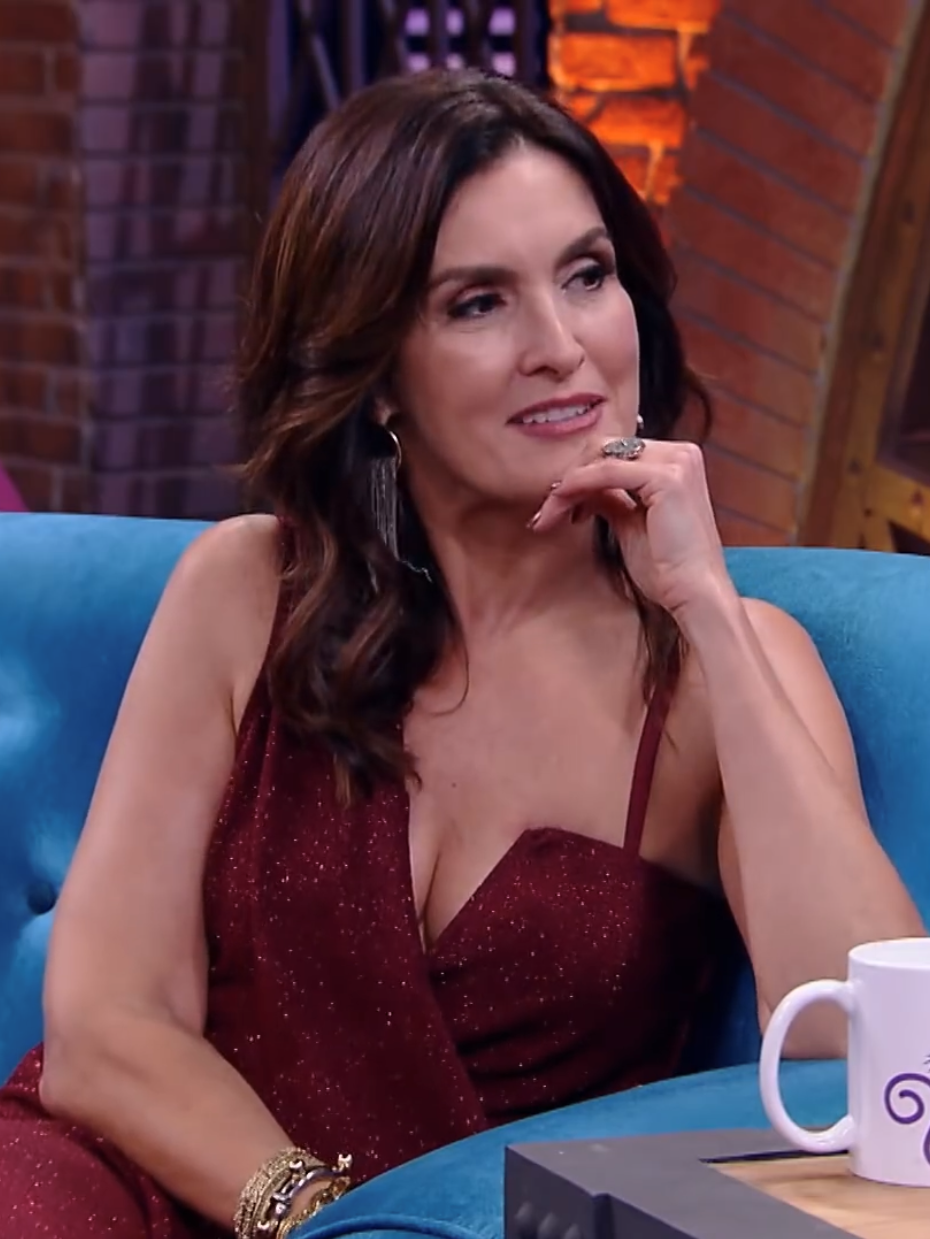
- Bernardes in 2019
- Born: Fátima Gomes Bernardes; 17 September 1962 (age 63); Rio de Janeiro, Guanabara, Brazil
- Education: Federal University of Rio de Janeiro
- Occupations: Journalist; TV host
- Years active: 1987–present
- Notable credit(s): Encontro (2012–2022); Jornal Nacional (1998–2011); Jornal Hoje (1996–1997); Fantástico (1993–1996); Jornal da Globo (1989–1992); RJTV (1987–1989)
- Spouses: Marcelo Carvalho (m. 1987; div. 1988) William Bonner (m. 1990; div. 2016)
- Partner: Túlio Gadêlha (2017–present)
- Children: 3

Fátima Gomes Bernardes (born 17 September 1962) is a Brazilian journalist and TV host. She joined Rede Globo in 1987 as the host of RJTV, the regional news from Rio de Janeiro, and became widely known in 1989 when she hosted Jornal da Globo, the late night news program. She also hosted Fantástico, Jornal Hoje, and Jornal Nacional, where she was the news anchor from 1998 to 2011.

Bernardes hosted the morning talk show Encontro from 2012 to 2022. She continued working with Globo until 2024 when she left the channel.

== Biography ==
She studied at Colégio Pedro II before enrolling in the journalism program at the Federal University of Rio de Janeiro. She began working for the Brazilian newspaper O Globo in 1983. In February 1987, she joined Rede Globo as a news presenter, and in a few months she was hosting RJTV, Globo's regional news program for the state of Rio de Janeiro. In May 1989, she hosted late night news program Jornal da Globo alongside Eliakim Araújo, and from July 1989, with William Bonner, who she eventually married the following year.

== Filmography ==
TV
year	TV Show	Role	Network	Notes
2012	Encontro com Fátima Bernardes	Herself / presenter	Rede Globo	2012–2022
2012	Cheias de Charme (Sparkling Girls)	Herself	Rede Globo	Guest star
2014	Geração Brasil (Now Generation)	Herself / ceremonialist	Rede Globo	Guest star
2014	Tá no Ar: a TV na TV (Okay Up: TV on TV)	Herself	Rede Globo	Guest star
2015	Alto Astral (High Spirits)	Herself	Rede Globo	Guest star
2019	A Dona do Pedaço (Sweet Diva)	Herself	Rede Globo	Guest star
2020	Salve-se Quem Puder (Run For Your Lives)	Herself	Rede Globo	Guest star
2021	Filhas de Eva (A Woman's Fate)	Herself	Rede Globo	Guest star
2022	The Voice Brasil	Herself / presenter	Rede Globo	2022-2023
2023	Vai na Fé (Never Give Up)	Herself	Rede Globo	Guest star
2023	The Voice Kids Brasil	Herself / presenter	Rede Globo	2023
