= Hilton Gomes =

Brazilian newscaster, publicist and journalist

- Born: Hilton Gomes de Souza; 23 May 1924; Rio de Janeiro, Brazil
- Died: 17 October 1999 (aged 75); Rio de Janeiro, Brazil
- Occupation(s): Journalist, publicist, Anchor
- Years active: 1951–1989
- Notable credit(s): Jornal Nacional (1969–1972)
- Spouse: Maria Alice Esteves Gomes de Souza
- Children: 4
- Relatives: Rogério Gomes

Hilton Gomes de Souza, known professionally as Hilton Gomes (23 May 1924 – 17 October 1999), was a Brazilian newscaster, publicist and journalist. Gomes was the first anchorman of Jornal Nacional, the most-watched Brazilian news program, aired by TV Globo.

== Biography ==
Hilton Gomes began his television career in 1951 on the now extinct TV Tupi, being the first anchor on Brazilian television. He covered important coverage in the 60s, such as the assassination of John F. Kennedy and the arrival of Apollo 11 on the Moon. Hilton Gomes was also successful as the presenter of talk shows, such as 'Oh, Que Delícia de Show', and the Festival Internacional da Canção. His last job as an anchor was on TV Bandeirantes in the 80s.

== Death ==
Gomes died on 17 October 1999, in Rio de Janeiro, aged 75, due to heart problems.
