= Sérgio Chapelin =

Brazilian journalist (born 1941)

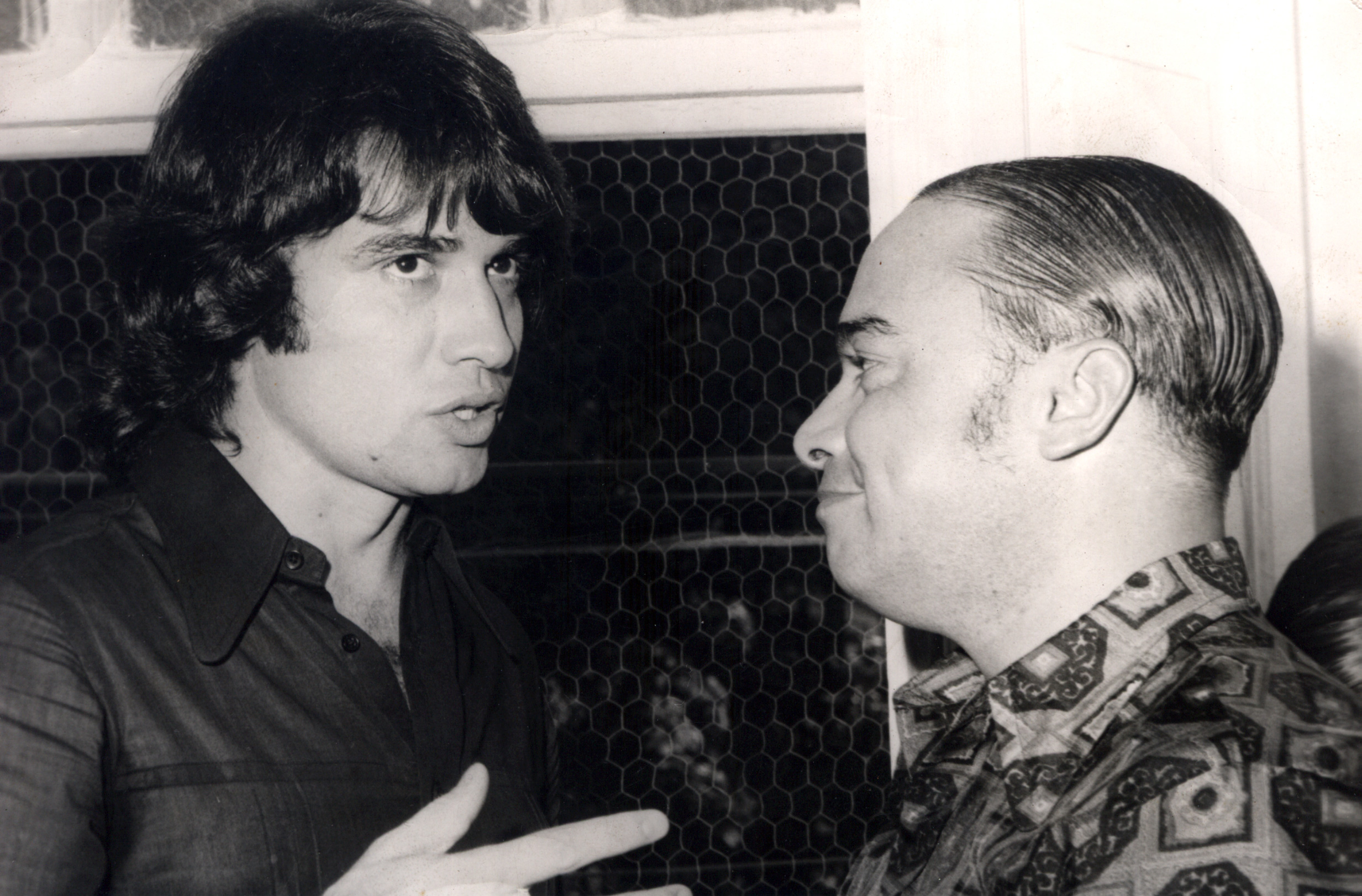
- Chapelin (left) in the 1970s.
- Born: Sérgio Vieira Chapelin; May 12, 1941 (age 85); Valença, Rio de Janeiro, Brazil
- Occupations: Journalist; Reporter; Radio host; Television host

Sérgio Vieira Chapelin (Valença, Rio de Janeiro, May 12, 1941) is a Brazilian journalist, reporter, announcer and television presenter.

== Personal life and career ==
Sérgio began his career as a radio announcer, working for Rádio Nacional, Rádio MEC and Rádio Jornal do Brasil. He made his debut at Rede Globo in 1972 as anchor of Jornal Hoje, replacing Ronaldo Rosas, and in the same year went on to anchor Jornal Nacional alongside Cid Moreira.

In 1983, Sérgio left Rede Globo to present Show sem Limite on SBT, but the experiment didn't work out, as the then president of Organizações Globo, Roberto Marinho, boycotted the advertisements Sérgio presented on his network - these advertisements were Sérgio's main source of income, so he soon returned to Rede Globo in 1984 to anchor Jornal Nacional again from 1989 and as the exclusive anchor of Fantástico until 1992.

Sérgio also became the first presenter of Globo Repórter, a program he presented for 23 years, until September 27, 2019, when he said goodbye to the program and the network. After almost fifty years at Globo, the journalist decided to retire. Chapelin has a farm in Itamonte, in the São Lourenço region, in the south of Minas Gerais.

== Works ==
- Jornal Nacional (1969)
- Fantástico (1973)
- Isto É Pelé (1975)
- Samba da Criação do Mundo (1978)
- Nas Ondas do Surf (1978)
- Copa 78 - O Poder do Futebol (1979)
- Show sem Limite (1983-1984)
- Uma Canção Brasileira (1986)
- Fantástico 30 Anos - Grandes Reportagens (2004)
- Globo Repórter (1973 - 1983, 1986 - 1989 and 1996 - 2019)

== See also ==
- Cid Moreira
- Globo Repórter
- Rede Globo
