= Patrícia Poeta =

Brazilian talk show host, former newscaster and journalist

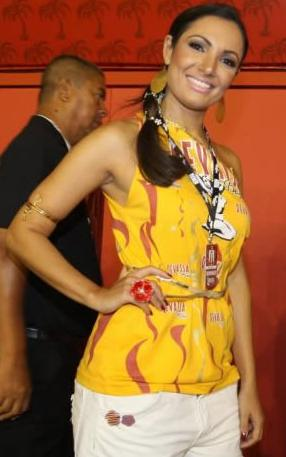
- Born: October 19, 1976 (age 49); São Jerônimo, Rio Grande do Sul, Brazil
- Education: Pontifical Catholic University of Rio Grande do Sul
- Occupations: Journalist and Anchor
- Years active: 2000–present
- Notable credit(s): Jornal Nacional anchor (2011-2014)
- Spouses: Amauri Soares (m. 2001; div. 2017)
- Children: Felipe Poeta Soares (son)
- Family: Ivo Barcellos Pfingstag (father); Maria de Fátima Poeta Pfingstag (mother); Paula Poeta (older sister); Paloma Poeta (younger sister)

Patrícia Poeta Pfingstag (born 19 October 1976 in São Jerônimo) is a Brazilian talk show host, former newscaster and journalist. She was born in Rio Grande do Sul and graduated in Journalism in 1998. Two years later, she was hired by Rede Globo, where she began weather forecasting. She hosted the show Fantástico and later Jornal Nacional/ JN until 2014, when she switched from journalism to entertainment. Upon leaving JN she co-hosted the show “É De Casa” alongside André Marques, Zeca Camargo, and Cissa Guimarães. In 2022, she was selected to host the show “Encontro” taking over for friend and journalist herself (formerly a co-anchor at JN also), Fátima Bernardes, who is the ex-wife of journalist (and Patrícia’s JN co-anchor) William Bonner.

== Personal life ==
She is a Catholic Christian, was married to Amauri Soares, and has one child from this union.
