= Renata Vasconcellos =

Brazilian newscaster and journalist

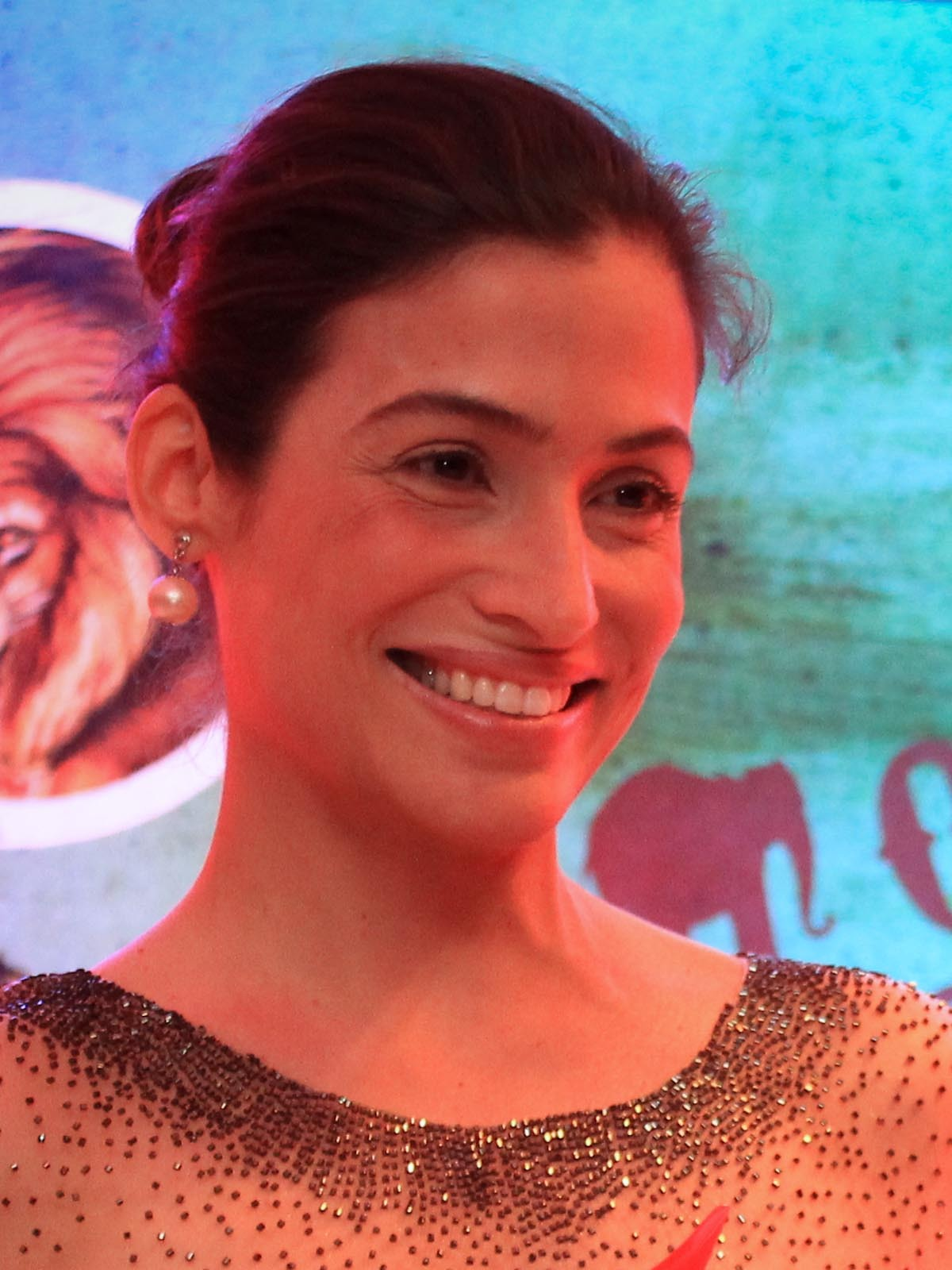
- Vasconcellos in 2023
- Born: Renata Fernandes Vasconcellos; June 10, 1972 (age 54); Rio de Janeiro, Brazil
- Education: Pontifical Catholic University of Rio de Janeiro
- Occupations: Journalist and Anchor
- Years active: 1997–present
- Notable credits: Bom Dia Brasil anchor (2003–2013); Jornal Nacional anchor (2014–prsesent)
- Spouses: Haroldo Mac Dowell (m. 1997–2010); Miguel Athayde (m. 2014)
- Family: Lanza Mazza (twin sister)

Renata Fernandes Vasconcellos (born June 10, 1972) is a Brazilian newscaster and journalist.

== TV news ==
- Bom Dia Brasil (2003 – 2013);
- Fantástico (2013 – 2014);
- Jornal Nacional (Since 2014).

=== Occasional presenter ===
- Jornal Nacional (2005-2013 and 2014).
