= Cid Moreira =

Brazilian journalist and television anchor (1927–2024)

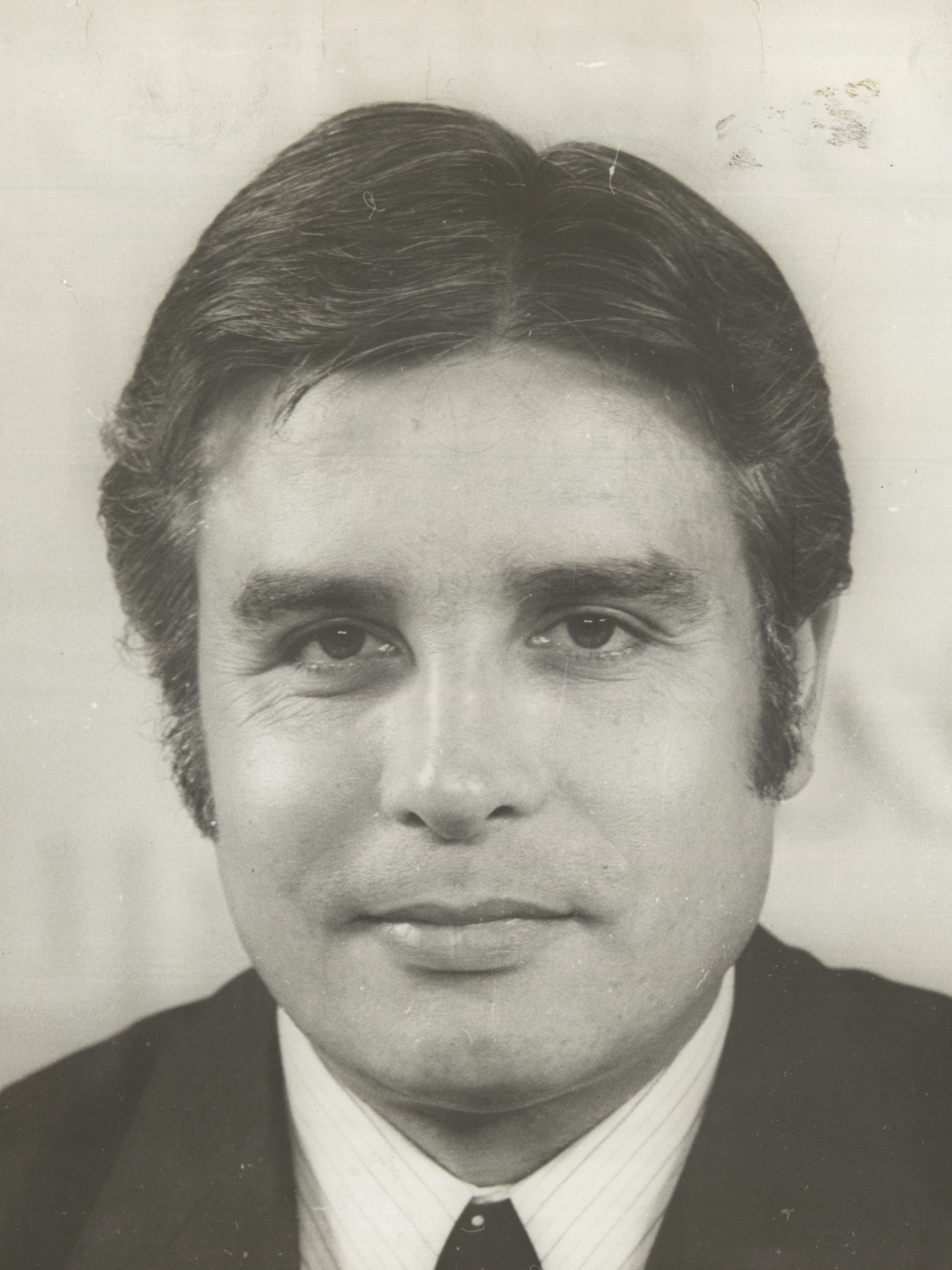
- Cid in Jornal Nacional
- Born: 29 September 1927; Taubaté, São Paulo, Brazil
- Died: 3 October 2024 (aged 97); Petrópolis, Rio de Janeiro, Brazil
- Occupations: Journalist; TV presenter; narrator

Cid Moreira (29 September 1927 – 3 October 2024) was a Brazilian journalist and television anchor who was active from 1947 onwards. He was born in Taubaté, São Paulo, and was mostly recognized for his work as the main anchor on Rede Globo's primetime news program Jornal Nacional between 1969 and 1996. He became widely known by his grave, resonating voice. Moreira was also a narrator, having recorded several audiobook versions of Biblical works. He died in Petrópolis on 3 October 2024, at the age of 97 due to a multiple organ failure after a nearly one-month hospital stay, initially due to chronic kidney failure. Moreira was a member of the Seventh-day Adventist Church.
