= Fantástico =

Brazilian television news program

- The logo of Fantástico in 2014, used since 1995
- Also known as: Fantástico — O Show da Vida
- Created by: José Bonifácio de Oliveira Sobrinho
- Directed by: Bruno Bernardes (program); Ricardo Vilella; Miguel Athayde
- Presented by: Poliana Abritta; Maria Júlia Coutinho
- Narrated by: Cid Moreira; Berto Filho
- Theme music composer: Guto Graça Melo
- Opening theme: "Fantástico"
- Country of origin: Brazil
- Original language: Portuguese
- No. of seasons: 52

Production
- Production location: Rio de Janeiro
- Camera setup: Single-camera
- Running time: 160 minutes
- Production company: Central Globo de Jornalismo

Original release
- Network: TV Globo
- Release: 5 August 1973 – present

Fantástico (originally known as Fantástico: O Show da Vida, Portuguese for Fantastic —The Show of Life) is a Brazilian weekly television news program broadcast on Sunday nights on TV Globo since 5 August 1973, created by José Bonifácio de Oliveira Sobrinho.

It lasts two hours, including commercials. Currently presented by Maria Júlia Coutinho and Poliana Abritta, it has been recognized as one of the best programs of Brazilian television, besides being the most watched program on Sunday.

== History ==
Fantástico debuted on 5 August 1973 in black-and-white and began as a variety show featuring music, dance numbers, tele theater, humorous sketches and some news as well. The following year, it began transmission in color.

In 1988, the show began live broadcasts; in 1993, the format changed to a television newsmagazine. In 1996 Fantástico reported the Varginha UFO incident.

Scenographer Cyro Del Nero worked as the show's art director, designing much of the style of the series.

== Format ==
Fantástico is an open-ended newscast with hosts introducing and reporting stories. Some segments include the work of other reporters: This typically happens when going live to a location.

Its hosts stand in front of a backdrop that changes according to the story presented. The hosts undertake original reporting and investigations led by national newspapers, sourcing typically from O Globo.

Topics for each show vary, some are political, some involve scandals, the environment, crime, science, health, sports, religion, international news or a combination. Occasionally, stories develop into specials that span over a period of a few weeks. These stories are thematic, with hosts travelling the country to find their topic in Brazilian society. Past topics have included psychics, indigenous religions, São Paulo's crime wave, and Afro-Brazilian tribal customs.

In 1995, Fantástico showed the original Mr. Bean series (starring Rowan Atkinson), in 1996 it showed the famous magician David Copperfield and in 1999–2000 exhibited the controversial magician Val Valentino known as Mr. M – Valentino became famous thanks to narration by Cid Moreira.

In 2011, the Brazilian actors Otávio Muller and Heloísa Périssé play "Lolô" and "Tavinho", and Ingrid Guimarães presents the fictional supermodel "Leandra Borges".

Fantástico has included musical acts in live from stage at the new and big studio program since 27 April 2014. Among them, the actress and singer Demi Lovato performed on stage with some hits acoustically as "Really Don't Care" and "Neon Lights", aired on 4 May 2014. The Colombian singer, Shakira was also present in July 2014.

The action star Arnold Schwarzenegger who released the Terminator Genisys movie, had an interview on 31 May 2015.

=== Opening credits ===
The opening sequence was a traditional ballet and had a style reminiscent of the musical spectacle Pippin when the program premiered on 5 August 1973.

On 9 September 1983, a new opening sequence was updated with 3D graphics, featuring real ballet dancers performing around three-dimensional pyramids, with special costumes.

On 9 August 1987, a contemporary ballet featuring a Brazilian model Isadora Ribeiro was performed in a new opening sequence set against diverse landscapes, beginning with a lagoon at Mono Lake in the United States, and continuing through Scotland, Turkey, the Sahara Desert in Egypt, and the Grand Canyon in the United States.

On 10 April 1994, a brand-new opening sequence was made entirely in CGI.

On 23 April 1995, the traditional ballet was replaced by simple idents from 5 to 10 seconds, and Fantástico got a new logo which is described as a spiral, this logo (aside from some modifications in 1999, 2002, and 2005) has been the branding for the program ever since.

On 4 April 2010, a new opening sequence returned, this time altered to run for 30 seconds which shows the images of DNA, stars, waterfalls, schools, plant, among others are shown.

On 27 April 2014, a new opening sequence was created by a French director Steven Briand and included a French model and dancer Cathy Ematchoua, featuring her dancing against a grey background, performing magic tricks with square confetti, icons (such as origami and antique clock parts), and lights, though this was short-lived.

On 26 April 2015, singers Luiza Possi and Chay Suede performed the original 1973 opening theme song as the closing number of TV Globo’s 50th Anniversary Commemorative Special.

On 3 May 2015, a new opening sequence has been created, inspired by a work of art, focused on four natural elements with the models being incorporated into a rose plant (representing earth), an iceberg (representing water), clouds (representing air) and a volcano (representing fire).

On 12 March 2017, a new opening sequence returns to ballet, this time with an urban group performs with the four natural elements, and has been shortened to 1 minute ever since.

On 5 August 2018, a new opening sequence was created to celebrate the program's 45th anniversary, began with four dancers invoking four natural elements with the new graphics, this time in chroma key.

On 19 September 2021, in celebration of the 2,500th episode of the program, a new opening sequence was created, using ten dancers, the opening was recorded at Estúdios Globo, was inspired by four natural elements – water, fire, earth and air, and by new technological resources, seeking greater representation in the group's choice.

Since 27 April 2025, in celebration of TV Globo's 60th Anniversary, the current opening sequence premiered for the first time with Brazilian actress Isadora Cruz as a homage to the 1987 opening sequence, it was recorded in the studio, which has 300 m² of high-resolution LED panels, where Artificial Intelligence and Augmented Reality were used, and the cameras integrate with the images projected on the screens, generating the parallax effect. The opening sequence also takes inspiration from the four natural elements: water, fire, earth, and air.

=== Spin-off ===
There is a special television program in ten minutes called O Show da Vida É Fantástico. Even being an allusion to the original title, this program brings memorable music videos from the 1980s and 1990s, and now is reprising the following Destino Fantástico (Fantastic Destiny) of 2005/06, which shows the scenery and interesting things of the Brazilian territory.

Initially, presented the following "Clipes do Fantástico" ("Fantastic Clips"), Brazilian singers as Marina Lima, Paulo Ricardo (RPM band leader), Byafra, Sidney Magal, among others are present beside the former presenter of Fantástico Valéria Monteiro.

The program was broadcast on 19 May 2014 on Brazilian channel Viva, property by Globosat.

== Hosts ==
=== Current hosts ===
- Maria Júlia Coutinho (2021–present)
- Poliana Abritta (2014–present)

=== Former hosts ===
- Cid Moreira (1973–1992)
- Sérgio Chapelin (1973–1992)
- Glória Maria (1986–2007)
- William Bonner (1988–1993)
- Valéria Monteiro (1988–1992)
- Celso Freitas (1990–1996 and 2002–2003)
- Sandra Annenberg (1991–1996)
- Fátima Bernardes (1993–1996; 1997)
- Pedro Bial (1996–2007)
- Zeca Camargo (1998–2013)
- Eva Byte (a virtual hostess) (2004–2006)
- Tadeu Schmidt (2007–2021)
- Renata Ceribelli (2007–2013)
- Patrícia Poeta (2008–2011)
- Renata Vasconcellos (2013–2014)

== Ratings and recognition ==
=== Ratings ===
Fantastico is the most watched show on Brazilian television on Sunday since its debut. While still maintaining the lead, its rating had a significant drop, as well as other programs of TV Globo. Since 2003, the program has lost about 55% of its public: lost 26.9 rating points. That was also due mainly to the growing popularity of Rede Record's Domingo Espetacular and to the growth of Pay TV in Brazil and as well as SBT's Programa Silvio Santos, which is also recorded with a live studio audience.

A survey by TV Globo in 2012 pointed out that the program was watched by 13 million views, with 23 rating points, considering the national measurement Ibope where each point is equivalent to 569 259 people.

Season	Timeslot (BRT)	Episodes	Premiered		Ended		TV season	Viewers (in points)
Season	Timeslot (BRT)	Episodes	Date	Premiere viewers (in points)	Date	Finale viewers (in points)	TV season	Viewers (in points)
41	Sunday; 9:00 p.m.	52	5 January 2014	20	28 December 2014	18.7	2014–15	19

=== Awards ===
Fantástico was nominated for Best Web Hit at the 2010 MTV Video Music Brazil, due to host Zeca Camargo being filmed yawning, live, when the show returned from commercials on June 6, 2010. The video of this incident was one of the most viewed on the Brazilian internet in 2010. It lost, however, to the parody of Justin Bieber's "Baby" titled "Justin Biba" ("Little Gay Justin"), made by Galo Frito.
