= Jornal Nacional =

- Current logo used since 2025
- Created by: Armando Nogueira
- Presented by: César Tralli; Renata Vasconcellos
- Theme music composer: Frank De Vol
- Opening theme: "The Fuzz" (Instrumental)
- Country of origin: Brazil
- Original language: Portuguese

Production
- Producers: Ricardo Vilella; Miguel Athayde
- Editors: Eric Hart; Isabella Guberman; João Paulo Garschagen; José Alan; Leopoldo Long; Maria Esperidião; Regina Montella; Ricardo Pereira
- Running time: 50 minutes (Note: The duration can be extended in case of special coverage. On days when the station broadcasts football matches, the news has 30 minutes.)
- Production company: Central Globo de Jornalismo

Original release
- Network: TV Globo
- Release: 1 September 1969 – present

Related
- Jornal da Globo (first incarnation)

Jornal Nacional (Portuguese for 'National News', pronounced [ʒoʁˈnaw nasi.oˈnaw, -sjoˈ-]) is the flagship television newscast of TV Globo and shown during prime time. First airing on 1 September 1969, according to IBOPE (Brazilian Institute of Public Opinion and Statistics), in the week of 28 September–4 October 2015, it was the second most watched program in Brazilian television, with an average of 26,007,251 viewers per minute (roughly 12.5% of the Brazilian population) and for 5.5 million people worldwide via TV Globo Internacional.

It airs Monday to Saturday, at 8:30 pm.

== History ==
César Tralli (left) and Renata Vasconcellos (right), anchors since 2025.

Jornal Nacional premiered on 1 September 1969, hosted by Hilton Gomes and Cid Moreira, the first Rio de Janeiro-produced newscast to be shown nationwide. Months later, the program featured the network's first female weekend presenter Márcia Mendes.

During the 1970s, Jornal Nacional preferred to emphasize international news and sports. The British documentary Beyond Citizen Kane suggests that this happened so that Globo wouldn't have to report the repression of the Brazilian military government, which would have provided a substantial part of the network's growth. Despite this, the program introduced some innovations (color broadcasts in 1972, via satellite reports in 1973, live reports in 1976 and videotape footage in 1977).

Through the 1980s, three episodes involving the program caused controversy. In 1982, Jornal Nacional's coverage of the state elections of Rio de Janeiro was accused of participating in a plot to rig the elections. According to former Rede Globo employee Roméro da Costa Machado, Leonel Brizola, a candidate of the opposition to the military regime, was a politician historically persecuted by Rede Globo owner Roberto Marinho. Two years later, the program was accused of omitting information about the Diretas Já, a popular campaign for resuming the direct election for president, near the end of the dictatorship. Finally, in 1989, Jornal Nacional was accused of editing a presidential debate between runoff candidates Fernando Collor and Luiz Inácio Lula da Silva in order to favor Collor. This episode is also extensively debated on Beyond Citizen Kane.

In the 1990s, the quality of Rede Globo's journalism increased dramatically. Jornal Nacional presented its viewers breaking stories such as police brutality at favelas, an interview with Paulo César Farias when he was on the run from the law, corruption cases on the social security, the kicking of the saint incident among several others.

In recent days, after the death of Marinho, Rede Globo's journalism again declined in quality. Jornal Nacional has preferred to broadcast stories produced on the Southeast, in spite of Globo having affiliates in every Brazilian state. During the Mensalão scandal and the 2006 general elections, Jornal Nacional was once again accused of airing biased anti-Lula news. It also lost a significant part of its viewership to Rede Record's Jornal da Record, which copied its style and also features former Jornal Nacional anchors, Celso Freitas and Marcos Hummel (as a relief presenter for Jornal da Record). In November 2005, host William Bonner caused controversy after he compared the average Jornal Nacional viewer with Homer Simpson, the ignorant main character of the American animated series The Simpsons.

As part of Rede Globo's 50th anniversary, Jornal Nacional was in 2015 given a brand new look and a brand new intro, however, the theme tune will remain unchanged. Between 17 March and 27 April that year, the newscast aired on chroma key.

On 19 June 2017, Jornal Nacional introduced a new set in the middle of a newsroom at Globo's Rio de Janeiro headquarters, which features a curved glass backdrop that can be used with laser projectors for background graphics, and augmented reality effects.

From 31 August through 30 November 2019, in honour of the program's 50th anniversary, Saturday editions of Jornal Nacional were broadcast with anchor pairings representing Rede Globo's affiliates. Just months afterward, as a result of the coronavirus pandemic, the network news division decided that Bonner become the alternate Saturday presenter, while overall presentation duties were assumed by reporters from the flagship station in Rio de Janeiro full time instead of São Paulo or Brasilla-based ones, with a four-person team appointed to alternate by twos the presentation of the Saturday edition, unless extraordinary news coverages on Saturdays (including sports events) warrant the presence of the weekday presenter team. Two more joined the Saturday pool for the 2021 season.

On 1 November 2025, as part of TV Globo's reorganization of news department announced on 1 September, Cristiana Sousa Cruz, who previously deputy editor-in-chief during Bonner's tenure as main presenter, was appointed as new editor-in-chief of Jornal Nacional, making it the first replacement of editor-in-chief in 26 years.

== Hosts ==
Jornal Nacional's first hosts were Hilton Gomes and Cid Moreira. In 1971, Sérgio Chapelin replaced Gomes and joined Moreira as the longest-running duo of program hosts. In 1983, Chapelin was replaced by Celso Freitas. Chapelin returned in 1989, hosting again with Moreira until 1996. In that year, William Bonner and Lillian Witte Fibe began serving as hosts. From 1998 and prior to 5 December 2011, Witte Fibe was replaced by Bonner's then-wife, Fátima Bernardes. Bonner and Bernardes recently tied with Chapelin and Moreira as the longest-running duo of Jornal Nacional hosts. From 31 October 2014, the former host of Fantástico, Renata Vasconcellos replaced Patrícia Poeta (who also replaced Fátima) and joined Bonner as the current hosts of the program.

On 1 September 2025, 56th anniversary of the program, William Bonner announced that he would step down as editor-in-chief (a position he served since 1999) and presenter (since 1996) of Jornal Nacional (a position he served since 1999) at the end of the year, in preparation to move his role as the presenter of Globo Repórter in February 2026. In turn, TV Globo announced that the last day of Bonner's tenure as presenter of JN would be on 31 October 2025. After that, César Tralli, which was JN's relief presenter since 2018, took over its helm as a new permanent presenter on 3 November 2025.

=== Main presenters ===
- Hilton Gomes (1969–1971)
- Cid Moreira (1969–1996)
- Ronaldo Rosas (1971-1972)
- Sérgio Chapelin (1972–1983; 1989–1996)
- Celso Freitas (1983–1989)
- William Bonner (1996–2025)
- Lillian Witte Fibe (1996–1998)
- Fátima Bernardes (1998–2011)
- Patrícia Poeta (2011–2014)
- Renata Vasconcellos (since 2014)
- César Tralli (since 2025)

=== Weather forecasting ===
- Fabiana Scaranzi (2000–2004)
- Rosana Jatobá (2004–2013)
- Flávia Freire (2012-2013)
- Michelle Loreto (2013-2015)
- Maria Júlia Coutinho (2015-2019)
- Anne Lottermann (2019-2021)
- Eliana Marques (since 2021)

=== Relief presenters ===
- Heraldo Pereira (since 2002)
- Ana Paula Araújo (since 2011)
- Ana Luiza Guimarães (since 2017)
- Flávio Fachel (since 2019)
- Márcio Bonfim (since 2020)
- Roberto Kovalick (since 2020)
- Aline Aguiar (since 2020)
- André Trigueiro (since 2020)
- Helter Duarte (since 2020)
- Mariana Gross (since 2020)
- Aline Midlej (since 2021)
- Paulo Renato Soares (since 2021)

==== Special Relief presenters for the 50th golden anniversary season ====
- Ayres Rocha (Acre)
- Filipe Todelo (Alagoas)
- Aline Ferreira (Amapá)
- Luana Borba (Amazonas)
- Jessica Senra (Bahia)
- Taís Lopes (Ceará)
- Philipe Lemos (Espírito Santo)
- Fábio William (Federal District)
- Matheus Ribeiro (Goiás)
- Giovanni Spinucci (Maranhão)
- Luzimar Collares (Mato Grosso)
- Lucimar Lescano (Mato Grosso do Sul)
- Aline Aguiar (Minas Gerais)
- Priscilla Castro (Pará)
- Sandro Dalpícolo (Paraná)
- Larissa Pereira (Paraíba)
- Marcelo Magno (Piauí)
- Márcio Bonfim (Pernambuco)
- Cristina Ranzolin (Rio Grande do Sul)
- Lídia Pace (Rio Grande do Norte)
- Ellen Ferreira (Roraima)
- Ana Lídia Daíbes (Rondônia)
- Fabian Londero (Santa Catarina)
- Carlos Tramontina (São Paulo)
- Lyderwan Santos (Sergipe)
- Mariana Gross (Rio de Janeiro)
- Thiago Rogeh (Tocantins)

== Ratings ==
Year	Viewers (in points)	Share (%)
2000	39.4	56,6
2001	37.8	56,6
2002	36.6	55,2
2003	36.6	56,7
2004	40 (39.8)	61,9
2005	35.8	54,8
2006	36.4	54,3
2007	34.0	53,8
2008	32.4	50,9
2009	30.9	50,4
2010	29.8	49,3
2011	32.0	52,4
2012	28.2	48,5
2013	26	45%
2014	23	37%

== Criticism ==
Some of the news aired by Jornal Nacional are criticized for not representing all points of view, manipulating news and being sensationalist.
