= Jornal Hoje =

Brazilian newscast of Globo Network

- Genre: News program
- Directed by: Ricardo Vilella; Miguel Athayde
- Creative directors: Alexandre Arrabal & Fernando Guimarães
- Presented by: Roberto Kovalick
- Theme music composer: Leonardo Matsumoto
- Opening theme: Based on the song "Evie" by Johnny Mathis (Instrumental)
- Ending theme: Same from the opening theme
- Country of origin: Brazil
- Original language: Portuguese

Production
- Production location: São Paulo
- Camera setup: Multiple-camera
- Running time: 75 minutes (daily); 45 minutes (saturday)
- Production company: Central Globo de Jornalismo

Original release
- Network: TV Globo
- Release: 21 April 1971 – present

Jornal Hoje is an early afternoon news program aired by the Brazilian television broadcaster TV Globo. The program is broadcast from Monday to Saturday, at 1:25 pm. Since 31 October 2025, it has been presented by Roberto Kovalick.

== History ==
The show premiered on 21 April 1971, almost two years after the premiere of Jornal Nacional, and replaced Show da Cidade (The City Show). Initially it was only shown in the state of the Rio de Janeiro and was then presented by Léo Batista and Luiz Jatobá.

The original idea was for a women's daily magazine, with reports on art, shows and interviews. On 3 June 1974, it began to be broadcast nationally. It was divided in sections and, with the same scenery, it had hosts in Rio de Janeiro, São Paulo and Brasília.

The final segment brought local news from affiliated broadcasting stations, such as the TV Ribeirão (now EPTV); the local news was shown after Globo Esporte since the 1980s, with the exception of São Paulo from 1990 to 1994, when they aired São Paulo Já in the Jornal Hoje timeslot. São Paulo Já's first edition later shortened the timeslot for room to bring back Jornal Hoje. SPTV now airs at its original timeslot at 12:00 p.m. local time since 1996.

On 8 August 2019, it was announced that Sandra Annenberg would present Globo Repórter and that Maria Júlia Coutinho would definitely take over the newscast from the end of September of the same year.

On 30 October 2025, as part of reorganization of TV Globo's news department announced on 1 September, Tralli presented Jornal Hoje for the last time due to his move to Rio de Janeiro as main presenter of flagship evening news program Jornal Nacional, a position previously anchored by William Bonner for 29 years. Beginning on 31 October 2025, Roberto Kovalick took over his role as main presenter of Jornal Hoje.

== Opening credits ==
Since the program's inception in 1971, the opening credits regularly featured a large "H" in the intro. It previously also included the Rede Globo logo, although this was removed after 1981, with an exception in 2000 to 2001, which featured to Rede Globo logo partially obscuring the opening credits, which was also used in other program intros from the late '90s to the 2000s. Since 1986, the "H" was shaded with yellow, with some minor changes, except in 1991 to 1999, and during 1991-94, the "H" had a grey-pink combination in a shaded form. During 1994-99, there were yellow and pink movements, stopping to form the "H".

== Presenters ==
=== Main presenters ===
- Roberto Kovalick (2025–present)
- Alan Severiano (relief presenter, 2021–present)

Weather forecast

- Jacqueline Brazil
  - Marcelo Pereira, Eliana Marques (Relief presenters)

Political Commentator

- Ana Fllor

Sports Commentator

- Karine Alves

=== Other presenters ===
- Zileide Silva (2007-2026)
- Fábio William (2013-2023)
- Marcelo Cosme (since 2019)
- Rodrigo Bocardi (2013-2016; 2020-2021)
- Alan Severiano (since 2021)
- Andréia Sadi (since 2023)
- Ana Paula Campos (since 2026)
- Tiago Scheuer (since 2025)
