= 2016 in Brazil =

Events in the year 2016 in Brazil:

== Incumbents ==
=== Federal government ===
- President:
  - Dilma Rousseff (until August 31)
  - Michel Temer (starting August 31)
- Vice President:
  - Michel Temer (until August 31)
  - Vacant (from August 31)

=== Governors ===
- Acre: Tião Viana
- Alagoas: Renan Filho
- Amapa: Waldez Góes
- Amazonas: José Melo
- Bahia: Rui Costa
- Ceará: Camilo Santana
- Espírito Santo: Paulo Hartung
- Goiás: Marconi Perillo
- Maranhão: Flávio Dino
- Mato Grosso: Pedro Taques
- Mato Grosso do Sul: Reinaldo Azambuja
- Minas Gerais: Fernando Damata Pimentel
- Pará: Simão Jatene
- Paraíba: Ricardo Coutinho
- Paraná: Beto Richa
- Pernambuco: Paulo Câmara
- Piauí: Wellington Dias
- Rio de Janeiro:
- Rio Grande do Norte: Robinson Faria
- Rio Grande do Sul: José Ivo Sartori
- Rondônia: Confúcio Moura
- Roraima: Suely Campos
- Santa Catarina: Raimundo Colombo
- São Paulo: Geraldo Alckmin
- Sergipe: Jackson Barreto
- Tocantins: Marcelo Miranda

=== Vice governors ===
- Acre: Maria Nazareth Melo de Araújo Lambert
- Alagoas: José Luciano Barbosa da Silva
- Amapá: João Bosco Papaléo Paes
- Amazonas: José Henrique Oliveira
- Bahia: João Leão
- Ceará: Maria Izolda Cela de Arruda Coelho
- Espírito Santo: César Roberto Colnago
- Goiás: José Eliton de Figueiredo Júnior
- Maranhão: Carlos Orleans Brandão Júnior
- Mato Grosso: Carlos Henrique Baqueta Fávaro
- Mato Grosso do Sul: Rose Modesto
- Minas Gerais: Antônio Eustáquio Andrade Ferreira
- Pará: José da Cruz Marinho
- Paraíba: Lígia Feliciano
- Paraná: Maria Aparecida Borghetti
- Pernambuco: Raul Jean Louis Henry Júnior
- Piaui: Margarete de Castro Coelho
- Rio de Janeiro: Francisco Dornelles
- Rio Grande do Norte: Fábio Dantas
- Rio Grande do Sul: José Paulo Dornelles Cairoli
- Rondônia: Daniel Pereira
- Roraima: Paulo César Justo Quartiero
- Santa Catarina: Eduardo Pinho Moreira
- São Paulo: Márcio França
- Sergipe: Belivaldo Chagas Silva
- Tocantins: Cláudia Telles de Menezes Pires Martins Lelis

== Events ==
=== March ===
- March 13: Hundreds of thousands of people all over Brazil protest against corruption and denounce the government of President Dilma Rousseff.
- March 15: Senator Delcídio do Amaral, the speaker of the Worker's Party (PT) signs a plea bargain with Operation Car Wash prosecutor Sergio Moro disclosing allegations of corruption against other political figures.
- March 16: Dilma Rousseff appoints former president Luiz Inácio Lula da Silva as her chief of staff, a position that would have made him immune from prosecution. A conversation between them was recorded and later leaked by Sergio Moro, who was rebuked for the disclosure.

=== April ===
- April 11: By 38 votes to 27, the commission for the impeachment process of President Dilma Rousseff approves the opinion of the rapporteur, Deputy Jovair Arantes (PTB) of Goiás.
- April 17: Brazil's Chamber of Deputies votes 367-137 in favor of beginning impeachment procedures against President Dilma Rousseff.

=== May ===
- May 5: Minister of the Supreme Federal Court, Teori Zavascki, removes Eduardo Cunha from his post as Federal Deputy and President of the Brazilian Chamber of Deputies.
- May 10: The Senate approves the removal of former Worker's Party Speaker Delcídio do Amaral for breaching decorum following his admissions in his March 15 plea bargain agreement.
- May 12:
  - The Brazilian Senate votes (55-22) to begin the impeachment process against the President of Brazil Dilma Rousseff and suspend her from office while the trial takes place.
  - Vice President of Brazil Michel Temer assumes presidential powers and duties as Acting President of Brazil.
  - Temer announces a new Cabinet, exclusively made of white males.
- May 24:
  - Temer announces plans for austerity measures.
  - Temer planning minister Romero Juca resigns after a recording of him is released, where he appeared to conspire to obstruct justice.
- May 25: President of the Supreme Federal Court, Minister Ricardo Lewandowski, prohibits the process of hidden proceedings in the Court.

=== June ===
- June 9: A bus plunges over a ravine in the state of São Paulo state, resulting in at least 18 people killed and 28 injured.

=== July ===
- July 7: Ousted deputy Eduardo Cunha resigns as President of the Brazilian Chamber of Deputies.
- July 14: Rodrigo Maia is elected President of the Brazilian Chamber of Deputies.
- July 29: Former President of Brazil Lula da Silva stands trial on obstruction of justice charges relating to the Petrobras scandal.

=== August ===
- August 5–21: The 2016 Summer Olympics are held in Rio de Janeiro, Brazil.
- August 10: The Federal Senate votes 59 to 21 to indict suspended President Dilma Rousseff on charges of breaking budget laws and put her on trial.
- August 25: Brazil's Federal Senate begins the impeachment trial of suspended President Dilma Rousseff.
- August 31
  - The Senate votes 61 to 20 in favor of removing Dilma Rousseff from office as President of Brazil. Vice President Michel Temer (who has been acting president since May 12) succeeds to the presidency and serves out the remainder of the term, which ends at midnight January 1, 2019.
  - Economic numbers released showing the Brazilian economy shrank 3.8% year-on-year in the second quarter.

=== September ===
- September 7–18: The 2016 Summer Paralympics are held in Rio de Janeiro, Brazil.
- September 12: Eduardo Cunha, former President of the Brazilian Chamber of Deputies, loses his position as Deputy following a vote of the Chamber, as a result of a series of corruption scandals.
- September 14: Brazilian prosecutors file corruption charges against former President Luiz Inácio Lula da Silva and his wife, Marisa Letícia Lula da Silva. Federal judge Sergio Moro will preside over his case.
- September 22: Brazilian police arrest former Finance Minister Guido Mantega as part of an ongoing probe into corruption.
- September 27: Senator Gleisi Hoffmann and her husband are indicted as part of the Operation Car Wash investigation.

=== October ===
- October 1: The South Is My Country a separatist movement that seeks the independence of Brazil's South Region, formed by the states of Paraná, Rio Grande do Sul, and Santa Catarina, holds an unofficial referendum. A total of 616,917 votes (which represents less than 3% the number of registered voters in these states) were counted according to the organizers of the ballot, 95% voting yes.
- October 2: Brazilian voters cast ballots in the first round of nationwide election for mayors and city councils in 5,568 municipalities.
- October 5: Former president Lula da Silva is charged with corruption linked to Odebrecht in Angola.
- October 15: The first elephant sanctuary in Latin America opens in Mato Grosso.
- October 17: Clashes between rival gangs in at least two prisons, leave at least 18 people dead.
- October 19: Former President of the Chamber of Deputies, Eduardo Cunha is arrested by the Federal Police in Operation Car Wash.
- October 20: Prosecutors file homicide charges against 21 employees of Samarco, Vale, and BHP for the Mariana dam disaster in Minas Gerais, which killed 19 people and polluted waterways.
- October 30: Second round of the nationwide election for mayors and city councils with more than 200,000 voters. The Workers' Party would suffer major losses in at the mayoral level.

=== November ===
- November 16: Former governor of Rio de Janeiro, Anthony Garotinho, is arrested by Federal Police, in Operation Chequinho.
- November 17: Former Rio de Janeiro governor Sérgio Cabral is arrested in a corruption probe.
- November 20: Four policemen are killed in Rio de Janeiro after their helicopter is shot down by a gang.
- November 21: Testimony begins in a corruption case against former President of Brazil Luiz Inácio Lula da Silva.
- November 23: The Brazilian Development Bank announces plans to repay up to $29 billion in loans to the Government of Brazil in order to stem a burgeoning deficit.
- November 25: Secretary of Government Geddel Vieira Lima resigns following allegations that he and President Michel Temer pressured a fellow cabinet minister into approving a real estate project.
- November 27: President Michel Temer, President of the Senate Renan Calheiros, and President of the Chamber Rodrigo Maia hold a press conference and announce the "institutional adjustment", which will not sponsor any proposal to amnesty crimes linked to the practice of electoral slush funds.
- November 28: Contractors and suppliers for the Rio de Janeiro Olympic Games claim they are owed millions in unpaid debts.
- November 29:
  - A chartered Avro RJ85 plane carrying 77 people, including the Chapecoense football team, crashes near Medellín, Colombia. Rescuers report that at least six survivors have been found in the wreckage. The 2016 Copa Sudamericana Finals are suspended.
  - Three of Brazil's leading football clubs – Flamengo, Palmeiras and São Paulo FC – offer to loan players to Chapecoense, after the team lost the majority of its squad in the LaMia Airlines Flight 2933 crash.
  - Protesters in Brasília hold a violent demonstration against a proposed public spending cap. Police use tear gas and rubber bullets in order to disperse the demonstrators.
  - The National Institute for Space Research (INPE) says deforestation has increased 29% this year, on top of a 24% increase the year prior.

=== December ===
- December 1: Odebrecht apologizes for "illicit actions in business activities".
- December 5: In association football, CONMEBOL officially awards Chapecoense the 2016 Copa Sudamericana title in the wake of the plane crash that killed almost the entire team. Atlético Nacional, who would have faced Chapecoense in the final and campaigned for the Brazilian club to be awarded the title, receives a fair play award from CONMEBOL.
- December 13: The Brazilian Senate passes PEC 55, a constitutional amendment requiring a 20-year spending cap, in a 53-16 vote.
- December 21: The construction firm Odebrecht and affiliated petrochemical company Braskem plead guilty of violating American foreign bribery laws in connection with the Petrobras deal.
- December 29: The Ambassador of Greece to Brazil, Kyriakos Amiridis, is reported missing while on vacation in Rio de Janeiro. A homicide team is investigating his disappearance.
- December 31: A body found in a burnt-out vehicle north of Rio de Janeiro is confirmed to be that of missing Greek Ambassador Kyriakos Amiridis. A military police officer who had an affair with the ambassador's wife confesses to the murder. The wife and a second man are also detained.

== Arts and culture ==
- 2015–16 Brazil network television schedule

== Sports ==
- 2016 in Brazilian football

== Deaths ==
=== January ===
- January 1: Gilberto Mendes, 93, composer.
- January 5: Antônio Pompêo, 62, actor.
- January 11: Reginaldo Araújo, 38, footballer (heart attack)
- January 14: Shaolin, 44, humorist (heart attack)
- January 25: Cláudio Clarindo, 38, ultra-distance cyclist (traffic collision)

=== February ===
- February 2: Luiz Felipe Lampreia, 74, diplomat.
- February 15: Paulo Barreto Menezes, 90, civil engineer and politician, Governor of Sergipe (1971–1975).

=== March ===
- March 7: Ana Luiza Pessoa de Queiroz, 60s, fashion agent (Rabih Kayrouz, Anne Valérie Hash).
- March 9: Naná Vasconcelos, 71, jazz percussionist and vocalist, eight-time Grammy Award winner (lung cancer)
- March 17: Gaúcho, 52, football coach and player (Flamengo), prostate cancer.
- March 18: José Carlos Avellar, 79, film critic (Jornal do Brasil).
- March 19: Roger Agnelli, 56, bank and mining executive, CEO of Vale S.A. (2001–2011), plane crash.
- March 25: Clodomir Santos de Morais, 87, sociologist.
- March 26: Lucas Gomes Arcanjo, 44, police officer and political activist (unexplained circumstances)
- March 28: Gilson Alvaristo, 59, professional cyclist.
- March 31: Amaury Epaminondas, 80, footballer (São Paulo F.C., Deportivo Toluca F.C.).

=== April ===
- April 1: Petrucio Melo, 65, television presenter (cardiac arrest)
- April 7: Flávio Guarnieri, 56, Portuguese-born Brazilian actor.
- April 25: Patrick Fabionn Lopes, 35, football player.

=== May ===
- May 6: Larry Pinto de Faria, 83, footballer (Sport Club Internacional).
- May 7:
  - Bernardo Ribeiro, 26, footballer (Skënderbeu, Newcastle Jets, IFK Mariehamn).
  - José Roberto Marques: 70, footballer (São Paulo).
- May 15: Cauby Peixoto, 85, singer
- May 30: Gérson Bergher, 91, politician

=== June ===
- June 5: Jarbas Passarinho, 96, politician, President of the Senate (1981–1983), Governor of Pará (1964–1966).
- June 6:
  - Hélio Garcia, 85, politician, Governor of Minas Gerais (1984-1987, 1991-1995).
  - Tunga, 64, sculptor and performance artist.
- June 9: Carillo Gritti, 74, Italian-born Brazilian Roman Catholic prelate, Territorial Prelate of Itacoatiara (since 2000).
- June 24: Francisco Ivens de Sá Dias Branco, 81, billionaire businessman.
- June 27: Luís Carlos Melo Lopes, 61, footballer.
- June 28: Fabiane Niclotti, 31, model, Miss Universo Brasil 2004.

=== July ===
- July 2: Irineu Roque Scherer, 65, Roman Catholic prelate, Bishop of Garanhuns (1998–2007) and Joinville (since 2007).
- July 4: Rondon Pacheco, 96, politician, Governor of Minas Gerais (1971–1975), pneumonia.
- July 7: Guilherme Karan, 58, actor (Super Xuxa contra Baixo Astral, Xuxa e os Duendes, Meu Bem, Meu Mal, TV Pirata), Machado–Joseph disease.
- July 13:
  - Héctor Babenco, 70, Argentine-born Brazilian film director, producer and screenwriter (Kiss of the Spider Woman, Ironweed, Carandiru), (heart attack)
  - Celso Peçanha, 99, politician, Governor of Rio de Janeiro (1961–1962).
- July 17: Sérgio Henrique Ferreira, 82, scientist.

=== August ===
- August 5: Vander Lee, 50, singer-songwriter (heart attack)
- August 6: Ivo Pitanguy, 90, plastic surgeon
- August 16:
  - Luis Álvaro de Oliveira Ribeiro, 73, businessman, president of Santos FC (2010–2014).
  - João Havelange, 100, football executive, ex-president of FIFA.
  - Elke Maravilha, 71, actress.
- August 22: Geneton Moraes Neto, 60, writer and journalist (aortic aneurysm)
- August 23:
  - Antônio Eliseu Zuqueto, 86, Roman Catholic prelate, Bishop of Teixeira de Freitas-Caravelas (1983–2005).
  - Goulart de Andrade, 83, television host and journalist.
- August 27: Alcindo, 71, footballer (Grêmio), diabetes.

=== September ===
- September 3: Claudio Olinto de Carvalho, 74, football player and coach.
- September 15: Domingos Montagner, 54, actor (drowned)

=== October ===
- October 14: Orival Pessini, 72, actor (A Praça É Nossa, Balão Mágico), comedian, plastic artist and creator of character Fofão, spleen cancer.
- October 25: Carlos Alberto Torres, 72, footballer and manager, world champion (1970) (heart attack)

=== November ===
- November 6: Redovino Rizzardo, 77, Roman Catholic prelate, Bishop of Dourados (2001–2015).
- November 20: Diógenes da Silva Matthes, 83, Roman Catholic prelate, Bishop of Franca (1971–2006).
- November 29:
  - Ananias, 27, football player (Chapecoense).
  - Mateus Caramelo, 22, football player (Chapecoense).
  - Dener, 25, football player (Chapecoense).
  - Guilherme Gimenez de Souza, 21, football player (Chapecoense).
  - Josimar, 30, football player (Chapecoense).
  - Caio Júnior, 51, football player and manager (Chapecoense, Vitória de Guimarães).
  - Filipe Machado, 32, football player (Chapecoense, CSKA Sofia).
  - Arthur Maia, 24, football player (Chapecoense, Vitória)
  - Bruno Rangel, 34, football player (Chapecoense).
  - Cléber Santana, 35, football player (Chapecoense, Atlético Madrid).
  - Marcos Danilo Padilha, 31, footballer (Chapecoense)
  - Mário Sérgio, 66, footballer, manager and commentator (Fox Sports).
  - Devair Paschoalon, 51, announcer (Fox Sports).
  - Paulo Julio Clement, 51, commentator (Fox Sports).
  - Victorino Chermont, 43, reporter (Fox Sports).

=== December ===
- December 4: Ferreira Gullar, 86, writer, essayist and art critic, pneumonia.
- December 8: Lélis Lara, 90, Roman Catholic prelate, Bishop of Itabira–Fabriciano (1996–2003).
- December 9: Élcio Álvares, 84, politician, Senator (1991–1994, 1995–1999), Minister of Defence (1999–2000), and Governor of Espírito Santo (1975–1979).
- December 10: Damião Experiença, 81, outsider musician.
- December 11: João Castelo, 79, politician, Governor of Maranhão (1979–1982), complications from surgery.
- December 14: Paulo Evaristo Arns, 95, Roman Catholic prelate, Cardinal (since 1973) and Archbishop of São Paulo (1970–1998), complications from pneumonia.
- December 23: Alida Victoria Grubba Rudge, 113, Brazil's oldest person.
- December 27: Mariza Corrêa, 71, anthropologist

== See also ==
- 2015 in Brazil
- 2016 in Brazilian football
- 2017 in Brazil
- Mensalão scandal
- Timeline of the Mensalão scandal
