= Diocese of Palmares =

Catholic ecclesiastical territory

Diocese of Palmares Dioecesis Palmopolitana

Catholic
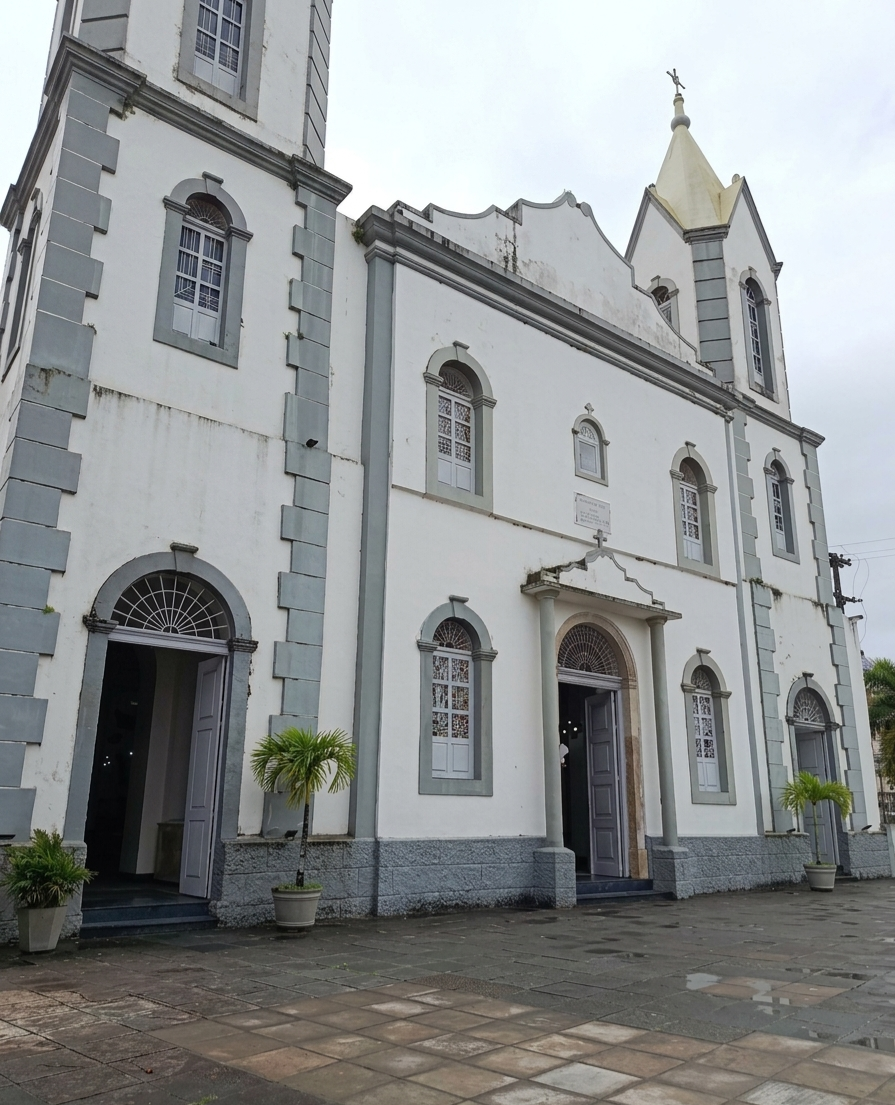

Location
- Country: Brazil
- Ecclesiastical province: Olinda e Recife

Statistics
- Area: 3,797 km^{2} (1,466 sq mi)
- Population: Total; Catholics: (as of 2004); 423,589; 270,913 (64.0%)

Information
- Denomination: Catholic Church
- Sui iuris church: Latin Church
- Rite: Roman Rite
- Established: 13 January 1962 (64 years ago)
- Cathedral: Catedral Nossa Senhora da Conceição dos Montes

Current leadership
- Pope: Leo XIV
- Bishop: Fernando Barbosa dos Santos, C.M.
- Metropolitan Archbishop: Paulo Jackson Nóbrega de Sousa
- Bishops emeritus: Genival Saraiva de França

The Roman Catholic Diocese of Palmares (Latin: Dioecesis Palmopolitana) is a diocese located in the city of Palmares in the ecclesiastical province of Olinda e Recife in Brazil.

== History ==
- 1962.01.13: Established as Diocese of Palmares from the Diocese of Garanhuns and Metropolitan Archdiocese of Olinda e Recife

== Bishops ==
- Bishops of Palmares (Latin Church)
  - Acácio Rodrigues Alves (11 July 1962 – 12 July 2000), retired
  - Genival Saraiva de França (12 July 2000 – 19 March 2014), retired
  - Henrique Soares da Costa (19 March 2014 – 18 July 2020)
  - Fernando Barbosa dos Santos, C.M. (9 June 2021 – Present)

=== Coadjutor bishop ===
- José Doth de Oliveira (1989-1991), did not succeed to see; appointed Coadjutor Bishop of Iguatú, Ceara
