= Angélico Sândalo Bernardino =

Brazilian Roman Catholic prelate (1933–2025)

His Excellency Angélico Sândalo Bernardino
- Bishop Emeritus of Blumenau
- Archdiocese: Joinville
- Diocese: Blumenau
- Appointed: 19 April 2000
- Term ended: 18 February 2009
- Predecessor: First
- Successor: Giuseppe Negri
- Previous post: Titular Bishop of Tambeae (1974–2000)

Orders
- Ordination: 12 July 1959 by Luis do Amaral Mousinho
- Consecration: 25 January 1975 by Paulo Evaristo Arns

Personal details
- Born: 19 January 1933 Saltinho, São Paulo, Brazil
- Died: 15 April 2025 (aged 92) São Paulo, Brazil
- Motto: Deus caritas est

Angélico Sândalo Bernardino (19 January 1933 – 15 April 2025) was a Brazilian Roman Catholic prelate, who served as bishop of Blumenau.

== Biography ==
Angélico Sândalo Bernardino was born in 1933 in Saltinho de Piracicaba, Brazil, and was ordained priest on 12 July 1959.

Pope Paul VI appointed him on 12 December 1974 Auxiliary Bishop in São Paulo and Titular Bishop of Tambeae. The Archbishop of São Paulo, Paulo Evaristo Cardinal Arns OFM, gave him the episcopal ordination on 25 January the following year; Co-consecrators were auxiliary bishops Benedito de Ulhôa Vieira and José Thurler from São Paulo.

Pope John Paul II appointed him on 19 April 2000, the first bishop of the diocese Blumenau, established on the same date. On 18 February 2009, Pope Benedict XVI accepted his age-related resignation.

In May 2022, he celebrated the marriage between former Brazilian President Luiz Inácio Lula da Silva and Rosângela da Silva.

Bernardino died in São Paulo on 15 April 2025, at the age of 92.

Catholic Church titles
Preceded by First	Bishop of Blumenau; 2000–2009	Succeeded by Giuseppe Negri
Preceded by Óscar Romero	Titular Bishop of Tambeae; 1974–2000	Succeeded by John Anthony Boissonneau
