= Rodrigues Alves (disambiguation) =

Rodrigues Alves (1848–1919) was the President of Brazil from 1902 to 1906.

Rodrigues Alves may also refer to:

== People ==
- Acácio Rodrigues Alves (1925–2010), first Roman Catholic bishop of the diocese of Palmares, Brazil.
- José Maria Rodrigues Alves (born 1949), known as Zé Maria, Brazilian footballer
- Vitor Manuel Rodrigues Alves (1935–2011), Portuguese soldier and politician

== Places ==
- Rodrigues Alves, Acre, a municipality in the state of Acre, Brazil
