= Pedra Branca =

Pedra Branca (Portuguese, 'white rock') may refer to:

- Pedra Branca (Tasmania), an island in Australia
  - Pedra Branca skink, a lizard endemic to Australia
- Pedra Branca, Ceará, a municipality in Brazil
- Pedra Branca do Amapari, a municipality in Brazil
- Pedra Branca, Paraíba, a municipality in Brazil
- Pedra Branca State Park, in Brazil
- Pedra Branca, Singapore, outlying island of Singapore
  - Pedra Branca dispute
- Pedrabranca Futebol Clube, also known as Pedrabranca, a Brazilian football club
- The Kamurú language

== See also ==
- Branca (disambiguation)
