= Delcídio do Amaral =

Brazilian politician (born 1955)

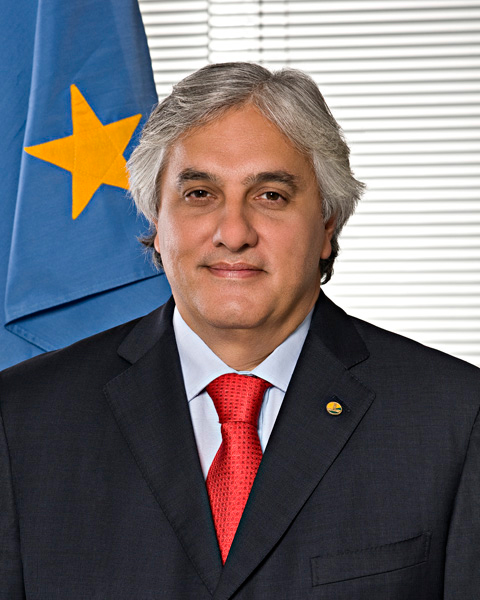
- Official portrait as Senator

Senator for Mato Grosso do Sul
- In office 1 February 2003 – 10 May 2016 (Note: Expelled from the Senate on 10 May 2016.)

State Secretary of Infrastructure and Housing of Mato Grosso do Sul
- In office 24 October 2001 – 4 April 2002
- Governor: Zeca do PT
- Preceded by: Vander Loubet
- Succeeded by: Maurício Gomes de Arruda

Minister of Mines and Energy Acting
- In office 21 September 1994 – 1 January 1995
- President: Itamar Franco
- Preceded by: Alexis Stepanenko
- Succeeded by: Raimundo Mendes de Brito

Personal details
- Born: Delcídio do Amaral Gómez; 8 February 1955 (age 71) Corumbá, Mato Grosso do Sul, Brazil
- Party: PRD (2023–present)
- Other political affiliations: PSDB (1998–2001); PT (2001–2016); PTC (2018–2019); PTB (2019–2023)
- Profession: Electric engineer, politician
- Awards: Order of Military Merit Order of Defence Merit

Delcídio do Amaral Gomez (born 2 February 1955) is a Brazilian politician. He worked at Shell and was nominated to Petrobras's Internacional Directory by president Fernando Henrique Cardoso where he worked until 2001 when he left Petrobras and start his relation with the Workers'Party . Before his relation with Workers' party, Delcidio nominated a new director to Fernando Henrique Cardoso, Nestor Cervero. He represented Mato Grosso do Sul in the Federal Senate from 2003 to 2016 and before he was removed from office, he was the high-representative of the Workers' Party in the Brazilian Senate. He was the speaker of his party in the Senate and the head of the Senate's economic affairs committee. Amaral was arrested in November 2015 for allegedly taking kickbacks from Petrobras. A Supreme Court judge, Teori Zavascki, said he authorised the arrest after seeing evidence that Amaral had planned the flight of Petrobras's former international director, Nestor Cerveró, in return for his silence. Ceveró was convicted of money laundering and sentenced to five years in prison.

On 16 March 2016 Amaral signed a plea bargain alleging involvement of other politicians in corruption scandals in Brazil. On 10 May 2016 the Senate approved by 74 votes in favor, the removal of Mr. Amaral from office for breaching parliamentary decorum. He is a São Paulo FC fan.

== See also ==
- Petrobras
- Operation Car Wash
- 2016 in Brazil
- Odebrecht
- List of scandals in Brazil

== Notes ==
Political offices
Preceded by Alexis Stepanenko	Minister of Mines and Energy; Acting; 1994–1995	Succeeded by Raimundo Mendes de Brito
Preceded by Vander Loubet	State Secretary of Infrastructure and Housing of Mato Grosso do Sul; 2001–2002	Succeeded by Maurício Gomes de Arruda
