= Diocese of Blumenau =

Catholic ecclesiastical territory

Coordinates: 26.9195°S 49.0668°W

Diocese of Blumenau Dioecesis Florumpratensis Diocese de Blumenau
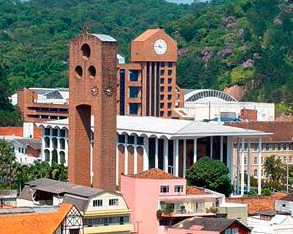
- Cathedral of St. Paul the Apostle

Location
- Country: Brazil
- Ecclesiastical province: Joinville
- Metropolitan: Joinville

Statistics
- Area: 3,388 km^{2} (1,308 sq mi)
- Population: Total; Catholics: (as of 2004); 609,000; 430,000 (70.6%)
- Parishes: 38

Information
- Rite: Latin Rite
- Established: 19 April 2000 (25 years ago)
- Cathedral: Cathedral of St Paul in Blumenau
- Patron saint: St Paul

Current leadership
- Pope: Leo XIV
- Bishop: Rafael Biernaski
- Metropolitan Archbishop: Francisco Carlos Bach

Website
- Website of the Diocese

The Roman Catholic Diocese of Blumenau (Latin: Dioecesis Florumpratensis) is a diocese located in the city of Blumenau in the ecclesiastical province of Joinville in Brazil.

== History ==
- April 19, 2000: Established as Diocese of Blumenau from the Metropolitan Archdiocese of Florianópolis, Diocese of Joinville and Diocese of Rio do Sul
- November 5, 2024: The diocese became a suffragan see of the newly promoted Archdiocese of Joinville

== Leadership ==
- Bishops of Blumenau (Roman rite)
  - Bishop Angélico Sândalo Bernardino (April 19, 2000 – February 18, 2009)
  - Bishop Giuseppe Negri, P.I.M.E., (February 18, 2009 – October 29, 2014), appointed Coadjutor Bishop of Santo Amaro, São Paulo
  - Bishop Rafael Biernaski (June 24, 2015 – present)
