= Encontro com Patrícia Poeta =

Morning program

- Genre: Talk show
- Created by: Guel Arraes, Cláudio Manoel, Geneton Moraes Neto and Fátima Bernardes
- Directed by: J.B. "Boninho" Oliveira (2013-Present), Maurício Arruda, Mário Marcondes, Raquel Affonso, Maurício Farias (2012)
- Presented by: Patrícia Poeta; Manoel Soares
- Opening theme: Original instrumental
- Country of origin: Brazil
- Original language: Portuguese

Production
- Running time: 60 minutes

Original release
- Network: TV Globo
- Release: 25 June 2012 – present

Encontro com Patrícia Poeta (Meeting with Patrícia Poeta) is a morning talk show hosted by Patrícia Poeta, former host of É de Casa. It first aired on 25 June 2012 and is broadcast from Monday to Friday on Globo after Bem Estar (Well Being). In 2022, it was announced that Fátima Bernardes would leave the program after 10 years and as a result Patrícia Poeta was announced as the new host of the program, the change was affected on July 4 of that year.

== Format ==
Encontro com Patrícia Poeta mixes information, humor, music, and interviews in an informal context featuring significant interaction with the live studio audience.
