= Caetano Lima dos Santos =

Brazilian Capuchin friar and bishop

Caetano Lima dos Santos, OFMCap
- Church: Roman Catholic Church
- See: Diocese of Roman Ilhéus
- In office: 1958–1969
- Predecessor: João Resende (Rezende) Costa
- Successor: Roberto Pinarello de Almeida
- Previous post(s): Priest

Orders
- Ordination: December 15, 1940

Personal details
- Born: 26 October 1916; Altamira, Brazil
- Died: 11 November 2014 (aged 98)

Caetano Lima dos Santos, OFMCap (26 October 1916 – 11 November 2014) was a Brazilian Capuchin friar and bishop of the Roman Catholic Church.

Lima dos Santos was born in Altamira, Brazil in October 1916. He was ordained a priest on December 15, 1940 in the Order of Friars Minor Capuchin, and appointed bishop of the Diocese of Roman Ilhéus on April 16, 1958 and ordained bishop August 10, 1958. He resigned as bishop of Ilhéus December 16, 1969 and was then appointed Titular Bishop of Tagarbala, from which he resigned sometime the next year. With the agreement of the Pope, he returned to the secular state and married Sister Maria Vila Boas de Almeida, with whom he fell in love.
