= M. Dias Branco =

Brazilian multinational company

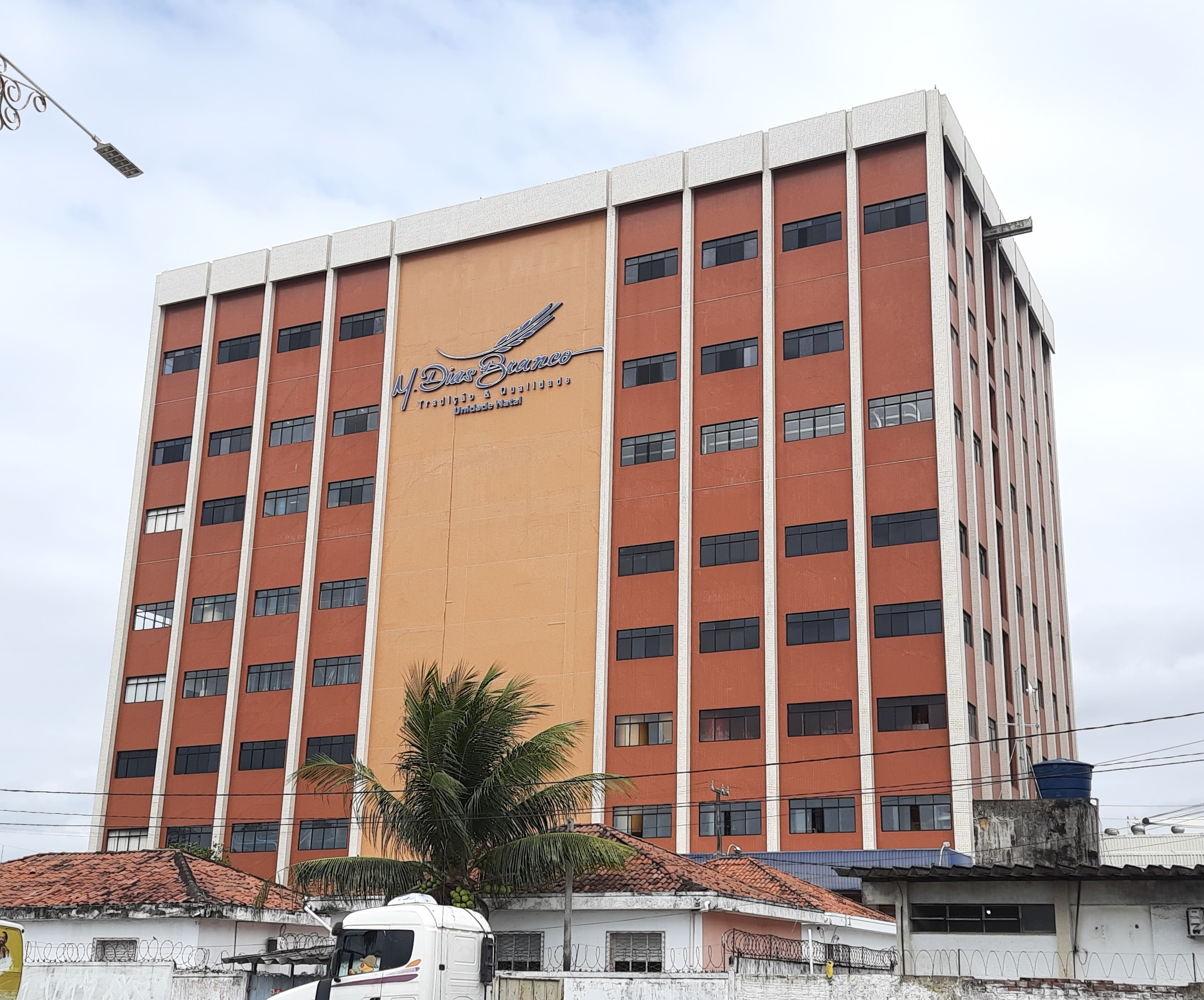
Food industry M. Dias Branco in Natal.

M. Dias Branco S.A. is a Brazilian multinational company that manufactures, markets and distributes biscuit, pasta, cakes, snacks, wheat flour, margarine and vegetable shortening throughout Brazil, headquartered in the city of Eusébio, Ceará.

M. Dias Branco is a public company, registered by BOVESPA, with shares traded under the ticker MDIA3. It is the leading company in the field of pasta in Brazil, holding 26.1% of the Brazilian biscuit market and 25.4% of the pasta market, according to Ac Nielsen (Mar.Apr/2012), and the third largest producer Brazilian wheat flour. It employs almost fourteen thousand employees, has fourteen industrial units and 25 distribution centers throughout the country.

== History ==
M. Dias Branco S/A emerged from an undertaking by the then future businessman, Manuel Dias Branco, in the city of Cedro, Ceará, later the bakery Padaria Imperial. The year was 1936 and in his bakery, Dias Branco produced bread, cookies and pasta from the Imperial brand for the population of Fortaleza. The bakery was on the bustling Avenida Visconde do Rio Branco.

In 1940 Manuel modernized his company, installing machines for the production of Imperial noodles and expanded his business, forming a partnership with his brothers José and Orlando, creating the company M. Dias Branco & Irmãos (The "M." comes from Manuel, the first name of the founder). In 1951 the bakery changes its address and name. The "Padaria Fortaleza" was transformed into a biscuit and pasta factory, which received the name "Fábrica Fortaleza" in 1953 when Francisco Ivens de Sá Dias Branco joined the company, changing the company's name to "M. Dias Branco & Cia. Ltd." In the following year, the company then invests in heavy machinery and, working in three shifts, creates the Pepita biscuit, which was its first great success.

In the 1960s, the company underwent major changes. In 1962, new products were launched, including the Petit Beure biscuit, and the character "Fortinho" was also created as the mascot of Fábrica Fortaleza, until then the only unit of the company. At the end of the decade, in 1967, the factory underwent its first expansion when it began to produce the "Extra-Fina" line.

The 1970s were years of consolidation for the company, which started to produce pasta for the North and Northeast regions, reaching leadership in these regions. In 1972, the cream cracker became one of the most popular products. In 1976, the new headquarters of Fábrica Fortaleza began to be built on BR-116, km 18, in the municipality of Eusébio (CE), on a plot of 600,000 m², which is currently one of the largest biscuit and pasta factories in Latin America. With the launch of the "Richester" line in 1978, the company reached new levels of sales, increasing its market share even more.

In 1980, the construction of the new facilities for the biscuit and pasta factory, in the municipality of Eusébio (CE), was completed, maintaining the name "Fábrica Fortaleza". With the new facilities, the company further expands its production and operations in the North-Northeast market. To improve the quality of its products, the company created in 1985 the Research and Analysis Center – CPA for certification and development of new products. In 1991 the company robotizes the packaging systems of its products.

In 1992, M. Dias Branco expands its activities and inaugurates its first wheat milling and wheat flour and bran production unit, becoming the largest mill in Brazil in terms of wheat and by-product storage capacity. This investment represented the first step towards verticalizing the company's biscuit and pasta production process. In 1999 the company launches the snack Tot's.

In 2000 the company obtains the ISO 9000 certification and is elected by Exame magazine as the best company in the segment in Brazil. Also in 2000, the company inaugurated a new wheat milling unit, called Grande Moinho Potiguar, in Natal, Rio Grande do Norte, and began the construction of a new industrial unit, comprising a wheat mill, a biscuit factory, a masses and a private mixed-use port. This complex is called Grande Moinho Aratu, and is located in the state of Bahia. In 2002, a new industrial unit was inaugurated, dedicated to the manufacture of margarine and vegetable shortenings, taking the second step towards deepening the verticalization of the biscuit and pasta production process. At this time, the Company already produced its own wheat flour and its own vegetable fat, two of the main inputs in the production of cookies and pasta.

In 2003, Empresa Adria Alimentos do Brasil Ltda, headquartered in the city of São Caetano do Sul (SP), is absorbed by M.Dias Branco. With this acquisition, M Dias Branco S/A added to its production structure the four industrial units then owned by Adria, headquartered in (São Caetano do Sul-SP), (Bento Gonçalves-RS), (Jaboticabal-SP) and ( Sheets Paulista-SP). This acquisition gave M. Dias Branco the outstanding leadership in the biscuit and pasta markets in Brazil (according to Ac Nielsen), adding the Adria, Zabet, Isabela and Basilar brands to its portfolio. In the same year, two more mixed manufacturing and logistics complexes (mill, factory and distribution center), located in the state of Bahia and Paraíba, enter into operation.

The year 2006 was one of the most important in the history of M. Dias Branco S/A, due to its IPO, with the start of trading of its shares on the São Paulo Stock Exchange (BOVESPA), and entry into the Novo Mercado, at the highest level of corporate governance required in the Brazilian capital market. With this initiative, approximately 18% of the Company's capital stock passed, through a secondary offering of shares, into the hands of Brazilian and foreign investors.

On April 7, 2008, the company acquired, through its subsidiary Adria Alimentos do Brasil Ltda, the entire capital stock of the Pernambuco company Indústria de Alimentos Bom Gosto Ltda, known for its main brand, Vitarella. With this acquisition, M Dias Branco S/A expanded its significant leadership in the Brazilian pasta and cookies market, consolidating itself even more as the largest Brazilian company in this area. In November 2000, Indústrias de Alimentos Bomgosto Ltda - Vitarella - became directly controlled by M Dias Branco S/A.

== Brands and Companies ==
- Fortaleza: A biscuit, pasta and toast company. It was founded in 1953 in the capital of Ceará, a city that bears the same name as the brand. Fortaleza was the first to be launched by M. Dias Branco, being an evolution of the Imperial bakery, founded previously by Branco. Their mascot is a superhero boy called Fortinho present since 1962.
- Richester: It is a biscuit and pasta company founded in 1978, having been the first factory founded by M. Dias Branco after Fortaleza; Among their main brands are Animados Zoo (a children's brand consisting of sandwich cookies, wafers and snack cakes), Amori (sandwich cookies and wafers), Escureto (Amori's variation on vanilla flavor and a competitor of the Oreo brand), Yoi (instant noodles), Superiore (cream crackers and marie biscuits) and Gold Class (crackers).
- Adria: It is a biscuit and pasta company. Previously, the brand belonged to Adria Alimentos do Brasil when the company was then acquired by M. Dias Branco S/A in 2003.
- Vitarella: It is a cookies and pasta company from Pernambuco. Until 2008 it belonged to the Bom Gosto food industry, founded in 1993. Its factory is located in Jaboatão dos Guararapes, on BR-101, close to the ports of Suape and Recife, which allows for a quick flow of production. Currently, more than a hundred different items are produced, such as wafers, butters, donuts and savory snacks. Pasta such as spaghetti and lasagna are also produced. The brand stands out in the sales leadership of the M. Dias Branco Group in Pernambuco, its state of origin, and also in the states of Alagoas, Paraíba and Rio Grande do Norte, being also present in other areas of the country.
- Pilar: It is a biscuit and pasta company from Pernambuco. The brand previously belonged to NPAP Alimentos S/A when the company was acquired by M. Dias Branco S/A on April 26, 2011, through the subsidiary Indústria de Alimentos Bomgosto Ltda - Vitarella.
- Piraquê: It is a biscuit and pasta company from Rio de Janeiro. It focuses on the Southeast. On January 29, 2018, the food company M. Dias Branco bought Piraquê for 1.55 billion reais. On March 19, 2018, Cade approved the purchase. With the purchase of Piraquê, M. Dias seeks to increase its participation in the food market, mainly in the South and Southeast of the country.
- Basilar: A pasta company founded in São Paulo on 1964.
- Bonsabor: A biscuit and pasta company founded in 1999.
- Estrella: A biscuit and pasta company. With Portuguese roots, it started as a bakery in 1946, idealized by the young Pelágio de Oliveira Brandão. Its growth resulted in Fábrica Estrela which, in December 2011, became part of the M. Dias Branco brand portfolio. Their products are sold in the north and northeast regions.
- Finna: A flour brand. It is known as the most popular flour brand in the northeast region.
- Salsitos and Delicitos: Two snack brands sold only in 3 states of northeast region. Salsitos is a puffcorn brand and Delicitos is a wheat snack brand.
- Isabela: A biscuit, pasta, flour, snack cake and toast company. Was founded in 1954 by Bento Gonçalves in Porto Alegre, Rio Grande do Sul. is considered one of the largest companies in the southern region.
- Adorita, Puro Sabor and Medalha de Ouro: Margarine brands.
- Zabet: A biscuit company. Was founded in 1960 in São Paulo.
- Fit Food: Company specializing in healthy foods such as biscuits, nuts, pasta, snacks and butter.
- Frontera: Snacks like potato chips and tortilla chips.
- Jasmine: Company specializing in healthy foods founded in 1990 in Paraná.
- Las Acacias: Uruguayan food company founded in 1952. It was acquired in 2022 being the first acquisition of M.Dias Branco outside Brazil.
- Smart: Spice brand.

=== Former Brands ===
- Amorela: Margarine brand.
- Pelaggio: A biscuit and pasta company from Fortaleza, Ceará. It was founded by the Portuguese immigrant Pelágio Rodrigues Oliveira (also known for founding the company Estrela) in the late 90s. The company was known for manufacturing sandwich cookies, waffers, cream crackers, Marie biscuits, butter cookies, snack cakes and spaghetti. It was acquired in 2011 with the Estrela and Salsito brands, having been discontinued in 2022.
