= Paulo Menezes =

Paulo Menezes may refer to:

- Paulo Menezes (footballer) (born 1982), footballer from Brazil
- Paulo Menezes (football coach) (born 1978), Portuguese football manager
- Paulo Barreto Menezes (1925–2016), Brazilian civil engineer and politician
