= Branca (disambiguation) =

Branca is a given name and surname.

Branca may also refer to:

- Fernet Branca, a kind of drink

== Places ==
- Água Branca, a Brazilian municipality in the state of Alagoas
- Águia Branca, Espírito Santo, a Brazilian municipality in the state of Espirito Santo
- Areia Branca (Rio Grande do Norte) - city in Rio Grande do Norte, Brazil
- Areia Branca (Sergipe) - city in Sergipe, Brazil
- Casa Branca, São Paulo, a Brazilian municipality in the state of São Paulo
- Casa Branca, Sousel, a Portuguese civil parish in the municipality of Sousel
- Santa Branca, a Brazilian municipality in the state of São Paulo

== See also ==
- Pedra Branca (disambiguation)
