= Tito Buss =

- Bishop of Rio do Sul
- Church: Roman Catholic Church
- Archdiocese: Roman Catholic Archdiocese of Florianópolis
- See: Roman Catholic Diocese of Rio do Sul
- In office: 1969 - 2000
- Predecessor: diocese created
- Successor: José Jovêncio Balestieri
- Previous post(s): Prelate

Orders
- Ordination: December 8, 1951
- Consecration: August 3, 1969 by Alfonso Niehues

Personal details
- Born: September 1, 1925; São Ludgero, Brazil
- Died: April 30, 2013 (aged 87); Rio do Sul,

Tito Buss (1 September 1925 – 30 April 2013) was the Catholic bishop of the Diocese of Rio do Sul, Brazil.

Tito Buss was born in São Ludgero, Brazil. Ordained to the priesthood in December 8, 1951, he was named bishop in 1969 and retired in 2000.
