= Henrique Soares da Costa =

Brazilian Roman Catholic bishop (1963–2020)

His Excellency, The Most Reverend Henrique Soares da Costa
- Bishop of Palmares
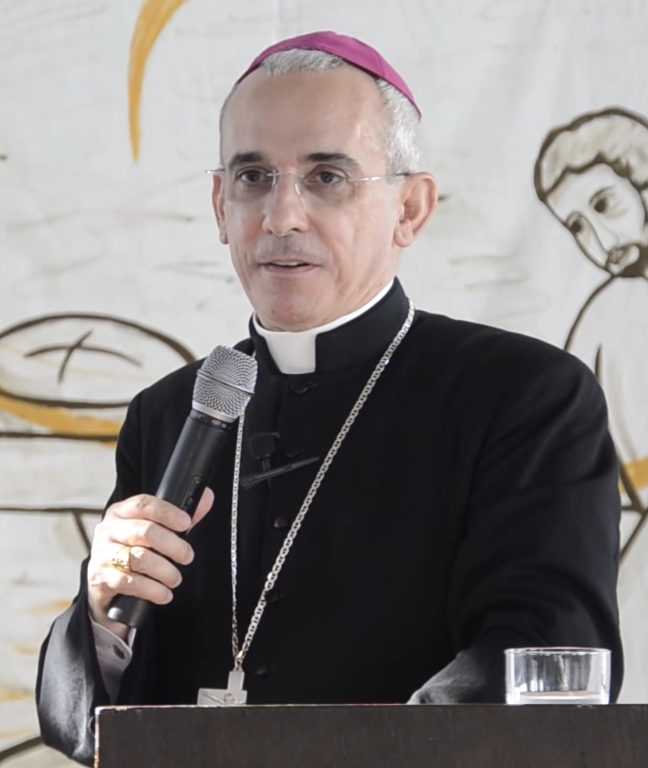
- Henrique Soares da Costa in 2014
- Archdiocese: Olinda and Recife
- Diocese: Palmares
- Appointed: 19 March 2014
- Installed: 19 March 2014
- Term ended: 18 July 2020
- Predecessor: Genival Saraiva de França
- Previous post: Auxiliary Bishop of Aracaju

Orders
- Ordination: 15 August 1992
- Consecration: 19 June 2009 by Antônio Muniz Fernandes

Personal details
- Born: 11 April 1963 Penedo, Alagoas, Brazil
- Died: July 18, 2020 (aged 57) Recife, Pernambuco, Brazil
- Education: Pontifical Gregorian University

Styles of Henrique Soares da Costa
- Reference style: His Most Reverend Excellency
- Spoken style: Your Excellency; Dom Henrique

Henrique Soares da Costa (11 April 1963 – 18 July 2020) was a Brazilian Catholic prelate who served as Bishop of Palmares from 2014 until his death in 2020.

== Biography ==
In 1981, Costa entered the Maceió Seminary and, in 1984, completed a bachelor's degree in Philosophy from the Federal University of Alagoas. From 1985 to 1989 he was a novice at the São Bento Monastery, in the city of Rio de Janeiro, and at the Trappist Monastery of Nossa Senhora do Novo Mundo in Curitiba.

He returned to the Seminary of Maceió, in 1990, where he started the Faculty of Theology. The following year, he went to Rome and completed theology at the Pontifical Gregorian University, with a master's degree in Dogmatic Theology.

He was ordained a priest on August 15, 1992. As a priest, he was rector of the Nossa Senhora do Livramento Church in Maceió, from 1994 to 2009 he was a professor of theology at the Maceió Provincial Seminary and in the Theology Course at the Center for Higher Studies in Maceió; he was also a professor at the Franciscan Institute of Theology, in the city of Olinda, and at the Sedes Sapientiae Institute, in Recife.

Costa was a member of the Presbyterian Council of the Archdiocese of Maceió, the Cabido Metropolitano and the Colégio de Consultores; he was also Episcopal Vicar for the laity and coordinator of the Political Formation Commission and responsible for the permanent deacons and for the archdiocesan diaconal school.

On April 1, 2009, he was appointed by Pope Benedict XVI as Auxiliary Bishop of the Archdiocese of Aracaju with the title of Acufida. He was ordained a bishop on June 19, 2009, by Dom Antônio Muniz Fernandes, Archbishop of Maceió.

On March 19, 2014, Pope Francis appointed him bishop of the Diocese of Palmares.

== Illness and death ==
On July 4, 2020, Costa was admitted to the Memorial Hospital São José, in Recife, with a severe respiratory problem from COVID-19, during the COVID-19 pandemic in Brazil. He accepted his situation well, according to his diocese, he was calm, serene and with a deep spirituality. Some time later, on July 18, he died at 57 years of age, victim of complications from the virus. His body, according to information from the Diocese, was taken to his hometown, Palmares. He was the third Brazilian bishop to die because of coronavirus.

== Canonization ==
Days after Soares da Costa's death, Brazilian Catholics have called for an immediate initiation for his canonization process. Currently, he is a probable candidate for sainthood.
