= Diocese of Ilhéus =

Catholic ecclesiastical territory

Coordinates: 14.7993°S 39.0322°W

Diocese of Ilhéus Dioecesis Ilheosensis

Catholic
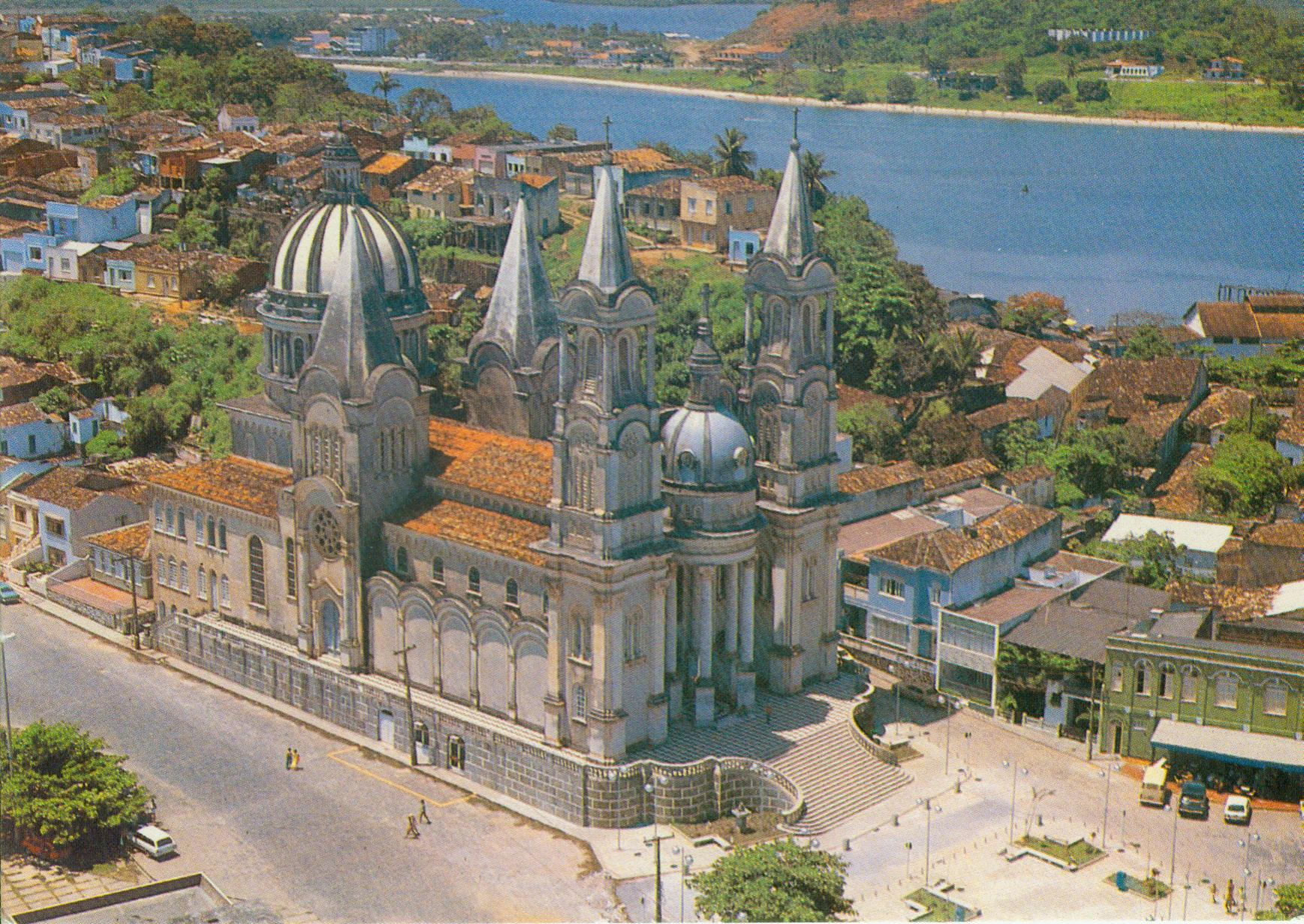
- Cathedral of St. Sebastian in Ilhéus

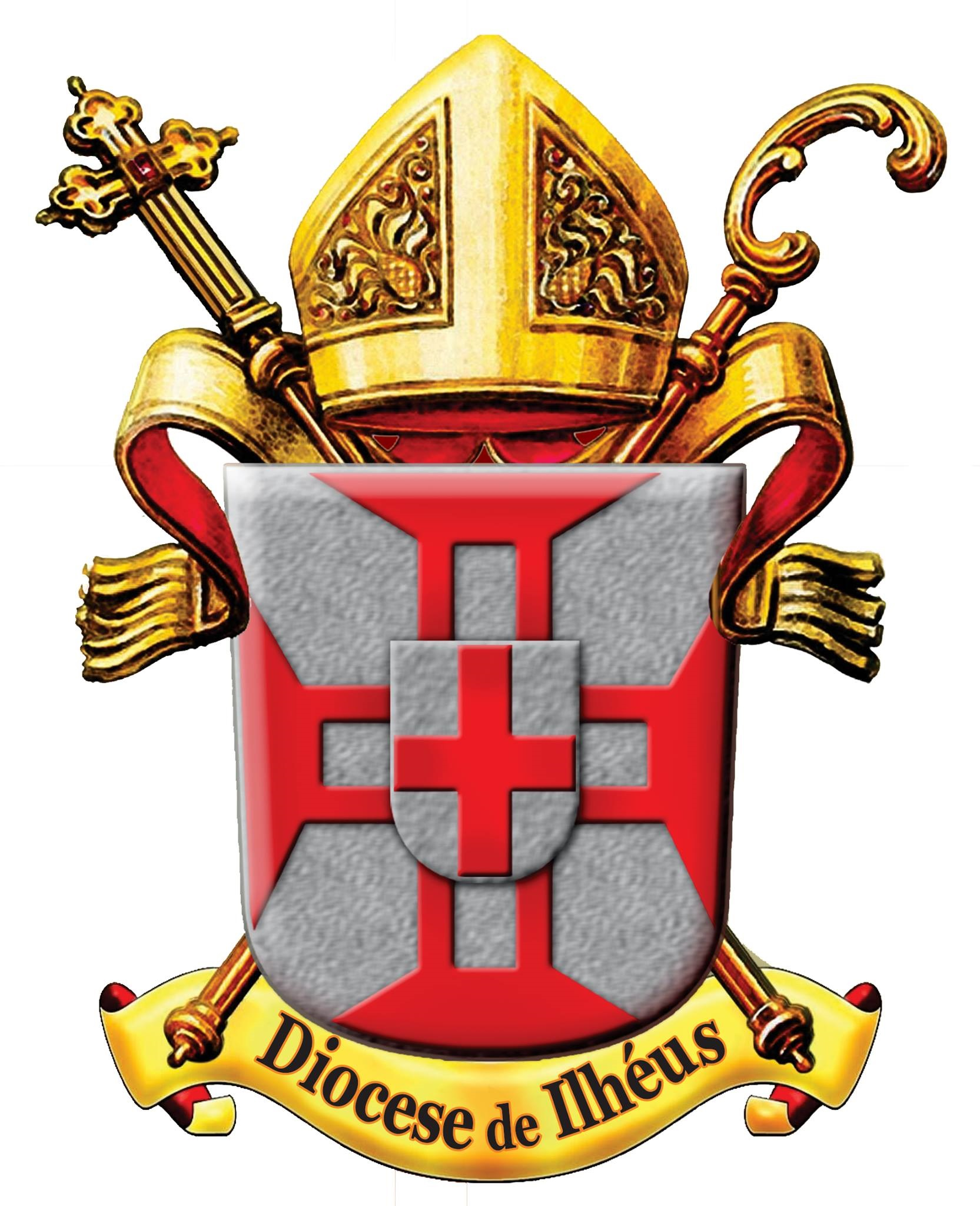
- Coat of arms

Location
- Country: Brazil
- Ecclesiastical province: São Salvador da Bahia

Statistics
- Area: 11,021 km^{2} (4,255 sq mi)
- Population: Total; Catholics: (as of 2006); 690,436; 493,179 (71.4%)

Information
- Rite: Latin Rite
- Established: 20 October 1913 (112 years ago)
- Cathedral: Catedral São Sebastião

Current leadership
- Pope: Leo XIV
- Bishop: Giovanni Crippa I.M.C
- Metropolitan Archbishop: Murilo Sebastião Ramos Krieger
- Bishops emeritus: Mauro Montagnoli, C.S.S.

Map
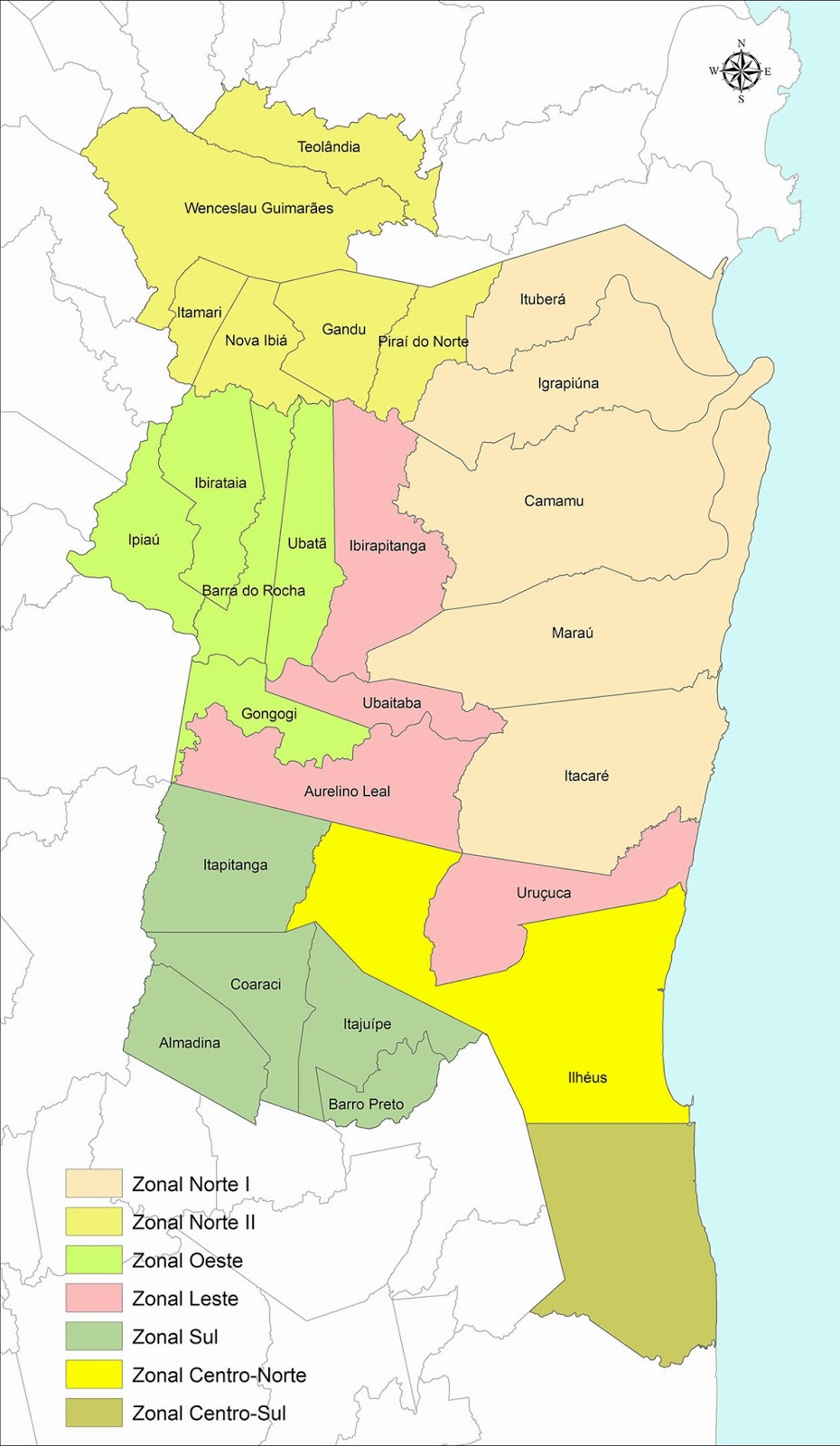

Website
- www.diocesedeilheusba.com

The Roman Catholic Diocese of Ilhéus (Latin: Dioecesis Ilheosensis) is a diocese located in the city of Ilhéus in the ecclesiastical province of São Salvador da Bahia in Brazil.

== History ==
On 20 October 1913 Pope Pius X established the Diocese of Ilhéus from the Metropolitan Archdiocese of São Salvador da Bahia. It lost territory twice with the establishment of two other dioceses. In 1962 Pope John XXIII established the Diocese of Caravelas and in 1978 Pope John Paul II established the Diocese of Itabuna

== Bishops ==
- Bishops of Ilhéus (Roman rite), in reverse chronological order
  - Bishop Giovanni Crippa I.M.C (2021.08.11 – present)
  - Bishop Mauro Montagnoli, C.S.S. (1995.12.20 – 2021.08.11)
  - Bishop Valfredo Bernardo Tepe, O.F.M. (1971.01.14 – 1995.07.05)
  - Bishop Roberto Pinarello de Almeida (1970.04.18 – 1971.01.14)
  - Bishop Caetano Antônio Lima dos Santos, O.F.M. Cap. (1958.04.16 – 1969.12.19)
  - Bishop João Resende Costa, S.D.B. (1953.02.23 – 1957.07.19), appointed Coadjutor Archbishop of Belo Horizonte, Minas Gerais
  - Bishop Benedito Zorzi (1946.08.03 – 1952.06.24)
  - Bishop Felipe Benito Condurú Pacheco (1941.04.19 – 1946.02.07), appointed Bishop of Parnaíba, Piaui
  - Bishop Eduardo José Herberhold, O.F.M. (1931.01.30 – 1939.07.24)
  - Bishop Manoel Antônio de Paiva (1915.03.15 – 1929.04.02), appointed Bishop of Garanhuns, Pernambuco

=== Other priest of this diocese who became bishop ===
- Cristiano Jakob Krapf, appointed Bishop of Jequié, Bahia
