= José Jovêncio Balestieri =

Brazilian Roman Catholic bishop (1939–2023)

His Excellency José Jovêncio Balestieri
- Bishop Emeritus of Rio do Sul
- Metropolis: Florianópolis
- Installed: 30 August 2000
- Term ended: 19 March 2008
- Predecessor: Tito Buss
- Successor: Augustinho Petry
- Previous posts: Bishop of Humaitá (1991–1998); Coadjutor Bishop of Rio do Sul (1998–2000)

Orders
- Ordination: 29 June 1968 by José Thurler
- Consecration: 19 May 1991 by Antônio Possamai

Personal details
- Born: 18 May 1939 Massaranduba, Santa Catarina, Brazil
- Died: 2 April 2023 (aged 83) Blumenau, Santa Catarina, Brazil

José Jovêncio Balestieri (18 May 1939 – 2 April 2023) was a Brazilian Roman Catholic prelate. He was bishop of Humaitá from 1991 to 1998, coadjutor bishop from 1998 to 2000, and bishop from 2000 to 2008 of Rio do Sul.

Catholic Church titles
Preceded by Tito Buss	Bishop of Rio do Sul; 2000–2008	Succeeded by Augustinho Petry
Preceded by Miguel d’Aversa	Bishop of Humaitá; 1991–1998	Succeeded by Franz Josef Meinrad Merkel
