= Diocese of Humaitá =

Catholic ecclesiastical territory

Coordinates: 7.5064°S 63.0205°W

Diocese of Humaitá Dioecesis Humaitanensis Diocese de Humaitá

Catholic
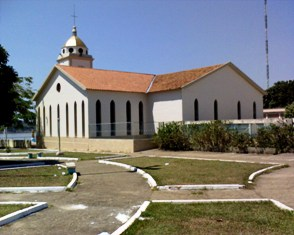
- Cathedral of Our Lady of the Conception

Location
- Country: Brazil
- Metropolitan: Archdiocese of Porto Velho
- Headquarters: Humaitá, Amazonas, Brazil

Statistics
- Area: 135,000 km^{2} (52,000 sq mi)
- Population: Total; Catholics: (as of 2023); 125,700; 83,000 (66.0%)
- Parishes: 8

Information
- Denomination: Catholic Church
- Sui iuris church: Latin Church
- Rite: Roman Rite
- Established: 26 June 1961; 65 years ago
- Cathedral: Catedral Nossa Senhora da Conceição
- Secular priests: 16 (7 Diocesan, 9 Religious Orders)

Current leadership
- Pope: Leo XIV
- Bishop: Sede vacante
- Metropolitan Archbishop: Roque Paloschi
- Bishops emeritus: Franz Josef Meinrad Merkel, C.S.Sp.

The Roman Catholic Diocese of Humaitá (Latin: Dioecesis Humaitanensis) is a diocese located in the city of Humaitá in the ecclesiastical province of Porto Velho in Brazil.

== History ==
- 26 June 1961: Established as Territorial Prelature of Humaitá from the Metropolitan Archdiocese of Manaus and Territorial Prelature of Porto Velho
- 16 October 1979: Promoted as Diocese of Humaitá

== Leadership ==
=== Prelates of Humaitá ===
- Josef Domitrovitsch, S.D.B. (5 August 1961 – 27 February 1962)
- Miguel d'Aversa, S.D.B. (21 May 1962 – 6 March 1991), retired
- José Jovêncio Balestieri, S.D.B. (6 March 1991 – 29 July 1998), appointed Coadjutor Bishop of Rio do Sul, Santa Catarina
- Franz Josef Meinrad Merkel, C.S.Sp. (26 July 2000 – 12 August 2020), retired
- Antônio Fontinele de Melo (12 August 2020 – 18 September 2026), appointed Bishop of Rio Branco, Acre
