= Túlio Gadêlha =

Brazilian politician

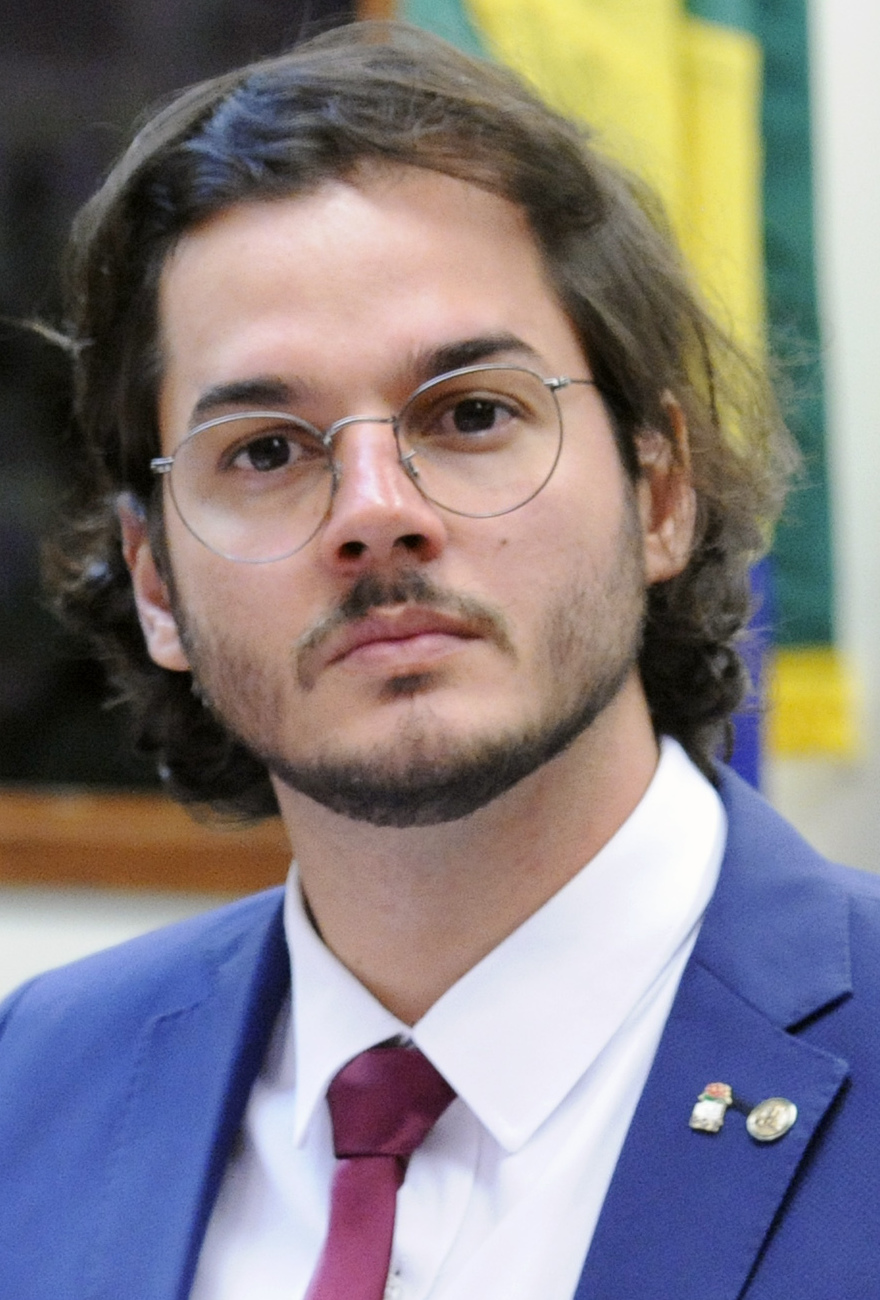
- Gadêlha in February 2019

Federal Deputy from Pernambuco
- Incumbent
- Assumed office 1 February 2019

Personal details
- Born: Túlio Gadêlha Sales de Melo; 12 November 1987 (age 38) Recife, Pernambuco, Brazil
- Party: REDE (2021–present)
- Other political affiliations: PDT (2007–21)
- Domestic partner: Fátima Bernardes (2017–present)
- Profession: Public servant

Túlio Gadêlha Sales de Melo (born 12 November 1987) is the Brazilian journalist Fátima Bernardes' partner since 2017. He is also a politician in Brazil. A member of the party Rede Sustentabilidade (REDE), he has served as a federal deputy for Pernambuco since 2019.

== Personal life ==
Gadêlha is an alumnus of Catholic University of Pernambuco. Since 2017 Gadêlha has been in a relationship with Grupo Globo journalist Fatima Bernardes. In his free time he is an avid surfer and beach goer.

== Political career ==
Gadêlha contested in the 2014 election, but only received 3,495 votes and was not elected to office. Poit was elected to be federal deputy for his home state of Pernambuco, being elected with 75,642 votes in the 2018 election. Gadêlha has been previously a strong critic of Michel Temer.
