= Roman Catholic Diocese of Teixeira de Freitas–Caravelas =

Catholic ecclesiastical territory

Diocese of Teixeira de Freitas–Caravelas Dioecesis Taxensis–Carabellensis Diocese de Teixeira de Freitas–Caravelas

Catholic
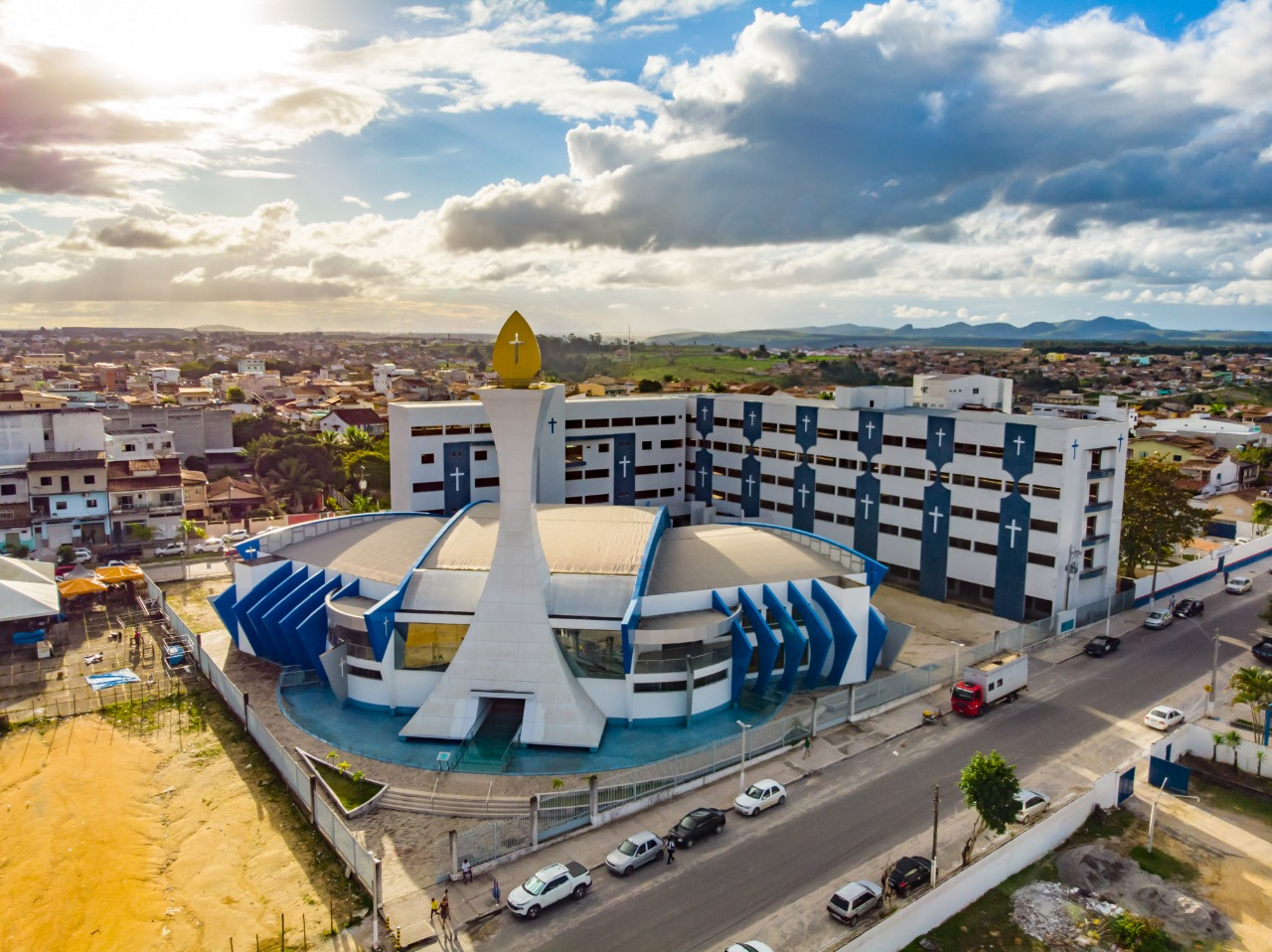

Location
- Country: Brazil
- Metropolitan: Archdiocese of São Salvador da Bahia
- Headquarters: Teixeira de Freitas, Bahia, Brazil

Statistics
- Area: 18,574 km^{2} (7,171 sq mi)
- Population: Total; Catholics: (as of 2023); 447,000; 353,350 (79.0%)
- Parishes: 39

Information
- Denomination: Catholic Church
- Sui iuris church: Latin Church
- Rite: Roman Rite
- Established: 21 July 1962; 64 years ago
- Cathedral: Catedral São Pedro, Teixeira de Freitas
- Co-cathedral: Catedral São Pedro, Caravelas
- Patron saint: Saint Peter
- Secular priests: 42 Diocesan

Current leadership
- Pope: Leo XIV
- Bishop: Aldemiro Sena dos Santos
- Metropolitan Archbishop: Sérgio da Rocha

Website
- dioceseteixeiradefreitas.com.br

The Roman Catholic Diocese of Teixeira de Freitas–Caravelas (Latin: Dioecesis Taxensis–Carabellensis) is a diocese located in the cities of Teixeira de Freitas and Caravelas in the ecclesiastical province of São Salvador da Bahia in Brazil.

== History ==
- 21 July 1962: Established as Diocese of Caravelas from the Diocese of Ilhéus
- 18 April 1983: Renamed as Diocese of Teixeira de Freitas–Caravelas

== Leadership ==
=== Bishop of Caravelas ===
- Filipo Tiago Broers, O.F.M. (2 May 1963 – 18 April 1983), resigned

=== Bishops of Teixeira de Freitas–Caravelas ===
- Antônio Eliseu Zuqueto, O.F.M. Cap. (18 April 1983 – 15 June 2005), retired
- Carlos Alberto dos Santos (15 June 2005 – 1 February 2017), appointed Bishop of Itabuna, Bahia
  - Administrator Edivaldo Oliveira Santana (7 April 2017 – 9 February 2018), Priest of Teixeira de Freitas–Caravelas
- Jailton de Oliveira Lino, P.S.D.P. (15 November 2017 – 25 February 2025), appointed Bishop of Itabuna, Bahia
- Aldemiro Sena dos Santos (4 February 2026 – Present)
