= Paulo Jackson Nóbrega de Sousa =

20th and 21st-century Roman Catholic Archbishop

His Grace, The Most Reverend, Mons. Dom Paulo Jackson Nóbrega de Sousa
- Metropolitan Archbishop of Olinda and Recife
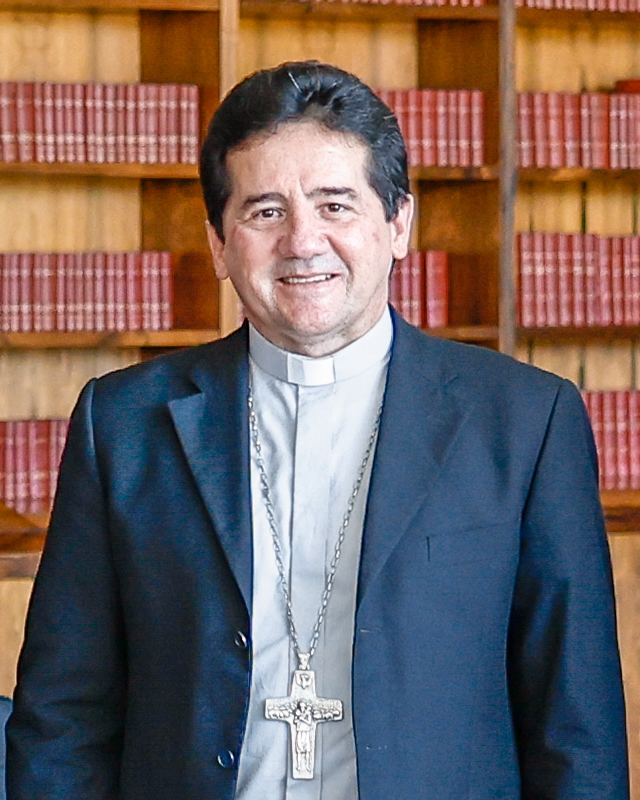
- Church: Roman Catholic Church
- Archdiocese: Olinda and Recife
- Province: Olinda and Recife
- Appointed: June 2023
- Installed: June 2023
- Predecessor: Dom. Antônio Fernando Saburido, O.S.B
- Previous post: Bishop of Garanhuns (2015-2023)

Orders
- Ordination: December 1993
- Consecration: July 2015

Personal details
- Born: Paule Jackson Nóbrega de Sousa; 17 April 1969 (age 57) Paraiba, Brazil
- Denomination: Roman Catholic
- Occupation: Archbishop, Clergyman
- Profession: Theologian, Philosopher, Scholar
- Motto: In Verbo Tuo
- Coat of arms

The Most Rev. Mons. Dom Paulo Jackson Nóbrega de Sousa (born on 17 April 1969) is a clergyman, diocesan priest, prelate, theologian, philosopher, and biblical scholar for the Catholic Church in Brazil who has been appointed as the Metropolitan Archbishop of Olinda and Recife. Previously he served as bishop of Garanhuns since 2015.

== Biography ==
Dom Paulo Jackson Nóbrega de Sousa was born on 17 April 1969 in Paraiba, Brazil. He studied philosophy and theology at Instituto de Teologia do Recife (ITER) in Recife-PE and the archdiocesan seminary of Paraíba in João Pessoa-PB. He receive his ordination as a priest in 1993 and his incardination was in the diocese of Patos. He began his pastoral work as parish administrator São Sebastião in Catingueira-PB, São Pedro in Patos-PB, Nossa Senhora das Dores in Mãe d’Água-PB and Nossa Senhora de Fátima in Patos-PB; parish vicar of Nossa Senhora da Guia; parish priest of Santo Antônio in Patos-PB and Nossa Senhora da Conceição in São Mamede-PB; rector of the diocesan seminary; diocesan pastoral coordinator; professor in the Pontifícia Universidade Católica de Minas Gerais (PUC-Minas) and the Faculdade Jesuíta de Filosofia e Teologia (FAJE); parish vicar of São Geraldo and parish administrator of Senhor Bom Jesus do Horto; and national secretary of the Organização dos Seminários e Institutos Filosófico-Teológicos do Brasil (OSIB). He then obtained licenciate and doctoral degree in biblical studies from the Pontifical Biblical Institute and Pontifical Gregorian University. He will replace Dom Antônio Fernando Saburido, O.S.B. His Installation will be take place in August 2023.
