= Vander Loubet =

Brazilian politician (born 1964)

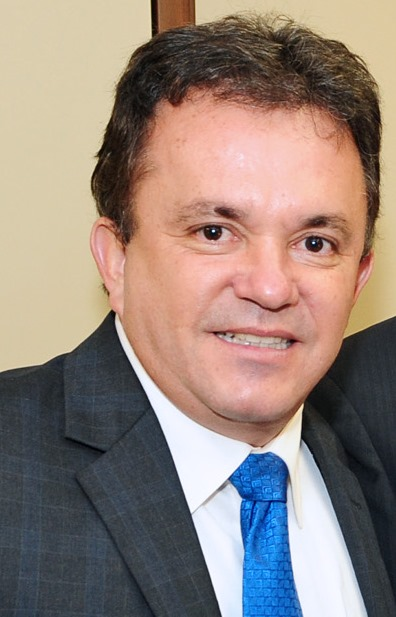
- Loubet in 2011

Member of the Chamber of Deputies
- Incumbent
- Assumed office 1 February 2003
- Constituency: Mato Grosso do Sul

Personal details
- Born: 22 January 1964 (age 62)
- Party: Workers' Party (since 1980)
- Relatives: Zeca do PT (uncle)

Vander Luiz dos Santos Loubet (born 22 January 1964) is a Brazilian politician serving as a member of the Chamber of Deputies since 2003. He is the nephew of Zeca do PT.
