= Vander Lee =

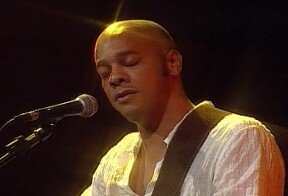
- Vander Lee in 2012

Background information
- Born: March 3, 1966
- Died: August 5, 2016 (aged 50); Belo Horizonte, Brazil
- Genres: rock, pop, and classical jazz.

Vander Lee (March 3, 1966 – August 5, 2016) was a Brazilian singer-songwriter. His songs were a fusion of rock, pop, and classical jazz.

He began his career singing in bars and festivals in Belo Horizonte and cities of Minas Gerais. In 1987, he joined the band Morro Velho, and recorded an EP that was never released. He released his first album in 1997.

He died in Belo Horizonte on August 5, 2016. The cause of death was a heart attack which came while at a spa. He was admitted to a hospital and underwent surgery.

== Discography ==
- Vanderly (1997)
- No Balanço do Balaio (1999), (Selo Kuarup)
- Vander Lee ao vivo (2003), (Indie Records)
- Naquele Verbo Agora (2005), (Indie Records)
- Pensei que Fosse o Céu ao vivo (2006), (Indie Records)
- Faro (2009), (Deckdisc)
- Sambarroco (2012), (Microservice)
- Loa (2014)
- 9 (2015)

== Videography ==
- Pensei que Fosse o Céu ao vivo (2006), (Indie Records)
- Entre (2006), (Produção independente)
