= João Resende Costa =

Brazilian Roman Catholic bishop and Salesian

João Resende Costa S.D.B.
- Archbishop of Belo Horizonte
- Church: Catholic Church
- Archdiocese: Archdiocese of Belo Horizonte
- In office: 15 November 1967 – 5 February 1986
- Predecessor: Antônio dos Santos Cabral
- Successor: Serafim Fernandes de Araújo
- Previous posts: Titular Archbishop of Martyropolis (1957-1967); Coadjutor Bishop of Belo Horizonte (1957-1967); Bishop of Ilhéus (1953-1957)

Orders
- Ordination: 28 July 1935
- Consecration: 24 May 1953 by Carlos Carmelo Vasconcellos Motta

Personal details
- Born: 19 October 1910 Borda da Mata, Minas Gerais, United States of Brazil
- Died: 21 July 2007 (aged 96) Belo Horizonte, Minas Gerais, Brazil

Bishop João Resende Costa, SDB was a Brazilian Roman Catholic bishop and a Salesian. He was the fifth Bishop of Ilhéus and the second Archbishop of Belo Horizonte. He was an attendee at the Second Vatican Council.

== Early life ==
He was born in Borda da Mata, October 19, 1910. Schooled in Borda da Mata, he entered the Lorena and Lavrinhas seminary after school and attended from 1924 to 1926. He then undertook studies is philosophy in Lavrinhas (1927–1929).

He made his theological studies at the Pontifical Gregorian University in Rome from 1932 to 1937, where he obtained the title of doctor and while in Rome he entered the Salesian Congregation in 1928, ordained in the Basilica of St. Ignatius in Rome.

== Early career ==
His early career included positions in:

- Director of the heart of Jesus high school, in São Paulo.
- Rector of the Seminary of Theology of the Salesians, in São Paulo.
- Inspector (provincial), Salesiano de São Paulo (1948–1952).
- Member of the Board of Governors of the Salesian Congregation, in Turin (1952).
- Member of the Brazilian delegation in the Inter-American Congress of Education in Bogotá, Buenos Aires and Rio de Janeiro.

== Episcopate ==
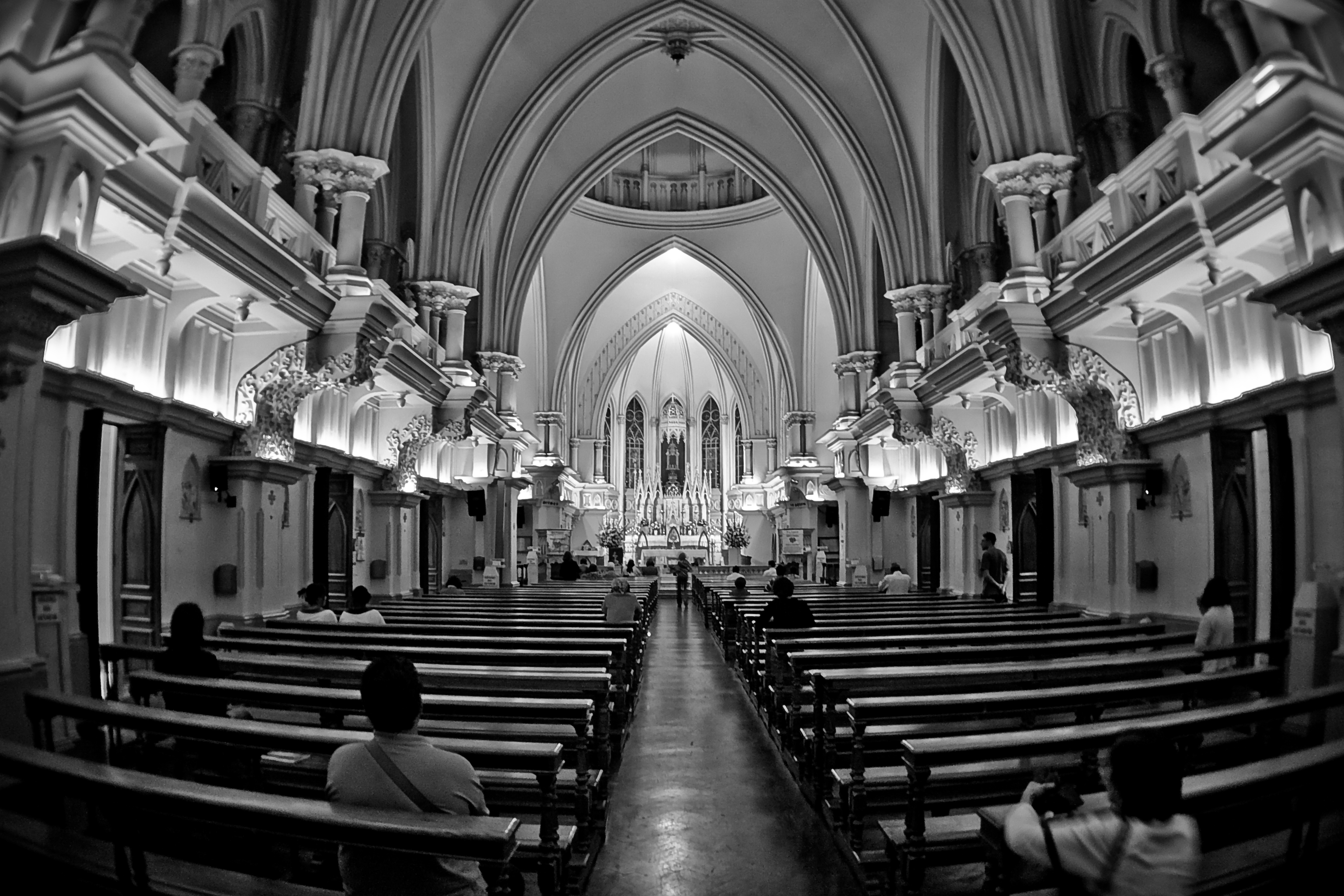
Interior of the Belo Horizonte Cathedral

On February 25, 1953, Pope Pius XII appointed him diocesan bishop of Ilhéus and he received his episcopal consecration on May 24, 1953, in São Paulo, from the hands of Cardinal Vasconcelos Motta and Archbishops Orlando Chaves, and Dom Antônio Campelo de Aragão.

On November 15, 1967, Pope Paul VI appointed him the second Archbishop of Belo Horizonte, a position he held until he resigned when he reach the age limit, on February 5, 1986. During his time as Bishop he also held the following positions:

- National Secretary of the religious, the CNBB (1964–1978).
- Secretary and Chairman of the East II Regional CNBB.
- Delegate to the Conference of Medellín (1968).
- Delegate to the Synod of Bishops (1977).
- President of the Brazilian delegation in the Interamerican Congress of Education in Havana.
- President of the Sociedade Mineira de Cultura.
- Grand Chancellor of the Pontifical Catholic University of Minas Gerais.

He died in 2007.
