= Patrick Lopes =

Brazilian footballer

Personal information
- Full name: Patrick Fabionn Lopes
- Date of birth: 20 August 1980
- Place of birth: Muriaé, Brazil
- Date of death: 25 April 2016 (aged 35)
- Place of death: São Paulo, Brazil
- Height: 1.80 m (5 ft 11 in)
- Position: Left back

Youth career
- Atlético Mineiro

Senior career*
Years	Team	Apps	(Gls)
1998–2000	Mirassol	11	(9)
2001	União São João	3	(8)
2002	Caxias	2	(9)
2003	Anapolina	6	(6)
2004	Guarani	35	(4)
2005–2006	Cruzeiro	14	(1)
2006	→ Fortaleza (loan)	7	(10)
2007	São Bento	7	(2)
2007	Ituano	7	(1)
2007–2012	União Leiria	65	(6)
2013	Ituano	16	(5)
2014	Nacional-MG	3	(1)
2014	Nacional Muriaé	9	(11)
Total		189	(68)
- * Club domestic league appearances and goals

Patrick Fabionn Lopes (20 August 1980 – 25 April 2016), sometimes known simply as Patrick, was a Brazilian footballer who played as a left back.

== Football career ==
Patrick Lopes was born in Muriaé, Minas Gerais, spending the better part of his career with modest Brazilian clubs. In January 2005, he signed a two-year contract with Cruzeiro Esporte Clube, but was also loaned during that timeframe to Fortaleza Esporte Clube; in his country's Série A, other than those two teams, he also represented Guarani Futebol Clube.

In the 2007–08 season, Patrick Lopes had his first abroad experience, signing with U.D. Leiria from the Portuguese Primeira Liga. He played 13 times in his first year, but the side suffered relegation to the second division.

At age 32, Patrick Lopes returned to his homeland, seeing out his career two years later after spells in the regional leagues with Ituano Futebol Clube, Nacional Esporte Clube (MG) and Nacional Atlético Clube (Muriaé).

== Death ==
Lopes died on 25 April 2016 in São Paulo at the age of 35, from a brain aneurysm.
