= Antônio Eliseu Zuqueto =

Antônio Eliseu Zuqueto O.F.M. Cap.
- Bishop of Teixeira de Freitas–Caravelas
- Church: Catholic Church
- Diocese: Diocese of Teixeira de Freitas–Caravelas
- In office: 18 April 1983 – 15 June 2005
- Predecessor: Filipe Tiago Broers
- Successor: Carlos Alberto dos Santos
- Previous posts: Titular Bishop of Tela (1980-1983); Auxiliary Bishop of Teófilo Otoni (1980-1983)

Orders
- Ordination: 19 March 1955
- Consecration: 8 June 1980 by Carmine Rocco

Personal details
- Born: 29 April 1928 Resplendor, Minas Gerais, Republic of the United States of Brazil
- Died: 23 August 2016 (aged 88)

Antônio Eliseu Zuqueto (29 April 1928 – 23 August 2016) was a Brazilian Roman Catholic bishop.

Ordained to the priesthood in 1955, Zuqueto served as bishop of the Roman Catholic Diocese of Teixeira de Freitas–Caravelas, Brazil, from 1983 to 2005.

== See also ==
- Roman Catholicism in Brazil
