= Diocese of Rio do Sul =

Catholic ecclesiastical territory

Diocese of Rio do Sul Dioecesis Rivi Australis Diocese de Rio do Sul
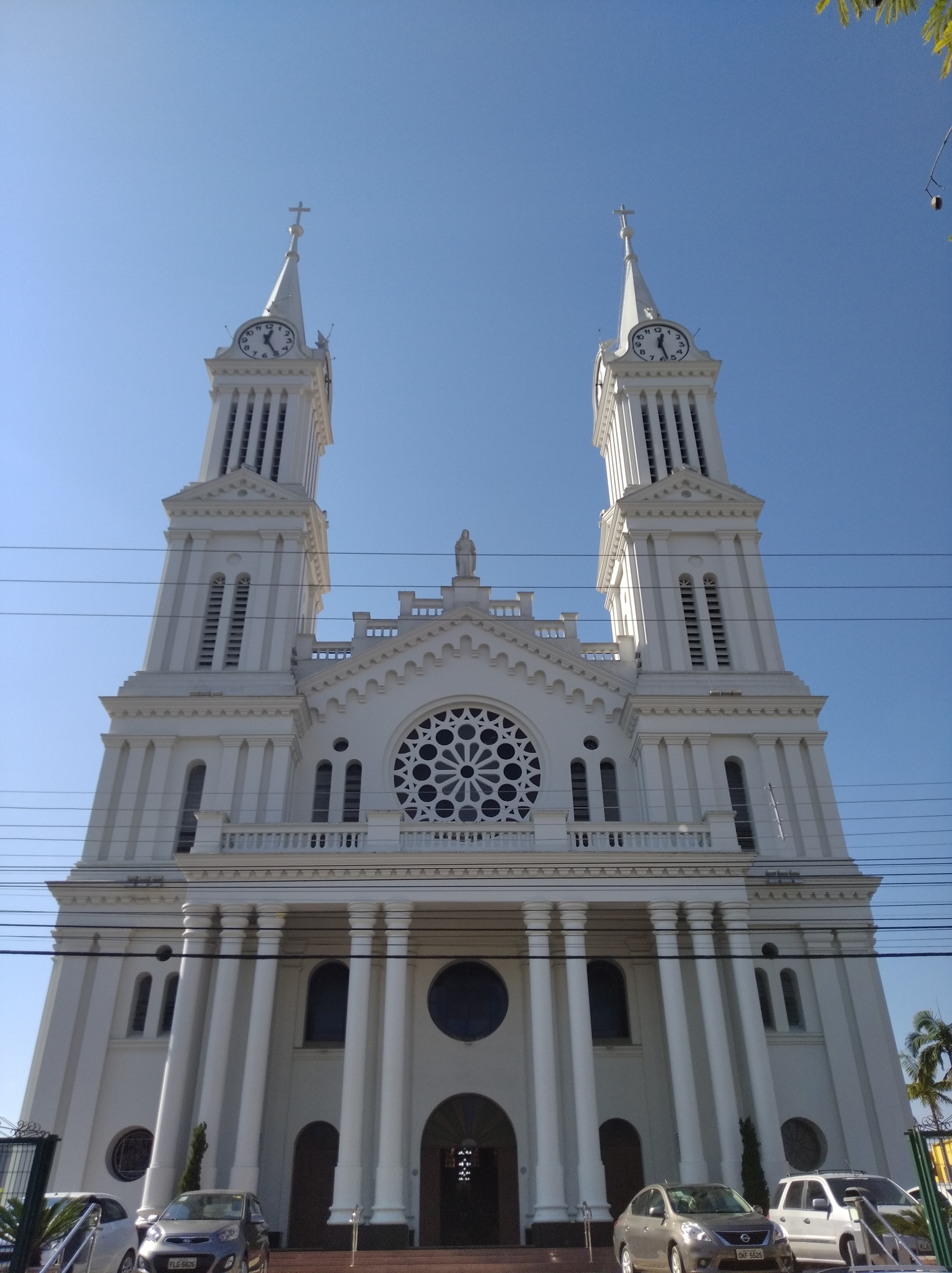
- Cathedral St John the Baptist in Rio do Sul in 2021

Location
- Country: Brazil
- Ecclesiastical province: Joinville
- Metropolitan: Joinville

Statistics
- Area: 9,659 km^{2} (3,729 sq mi)
- Population: Total; Catholics: (as of 2010); 308,000; 253,000 (82.1%)

Information
- Denomination: Catholic Church
- Rite: Latin Rite
- Established: 23 November 1968 (57 years ago)
- Cathedral: Cathedral St John the Baptist in Rio do Sul

Current leadership
- Pope: Leo XIV
- Bishop: Adalberto Donadelli Júnior
- Metropolitan Archbishop: Francisco Carlos Bach
- Bishops emeritus: Augustinho Petry

Website
- Website of the Diocese

The Roman Catholic Diocese of Rio do Sul (Latin: Dioecesis Rivi Australis) is a diocese located in the city of Rio do Sul in the ecclesiastical province of Joinville in Brazil.

== History ==
- November 23, 1968: Established as Diocese of Rio do Sul from the Metropolitan Archdiocese of Florianópolis and Diocese of Joinville
- November 5, 2024: The diocese became a suffragan see of the newly promoted Archdiocese of Joinville

== Bishops ==
- Bishops of Rio do Sul (Roman rite), in reverse chronological order
  - Bishop Adalberto Donadelli Júnior (2024.07.07 – Present)
  - Bishop Onécimo Alberton (2014.12.17 – 2023.11.01) appointed Auxiliary Bishop of Florianópolis, Santa Catarina
  - Bishop Augustinho Petry (2008.03.19 – 2014.12.17), retired
  - Bishop José Jovêncio Balestieri, S.D.B. (2000.08.30 – 2008.03.19), resigned
  - Bishop Tito Buss (1969.03.12 – 2000.08.30), retired

=== Coadjutor bishops ===
- José Jovêncio Balestieri, S.D.B. (1998-2000)
- Augustinho Petry (2007-2008)
