= Kyriakos Amiridis =

Greek diplomat

Κυριάκος Αμοιρίδης Kyriakos Amiridis
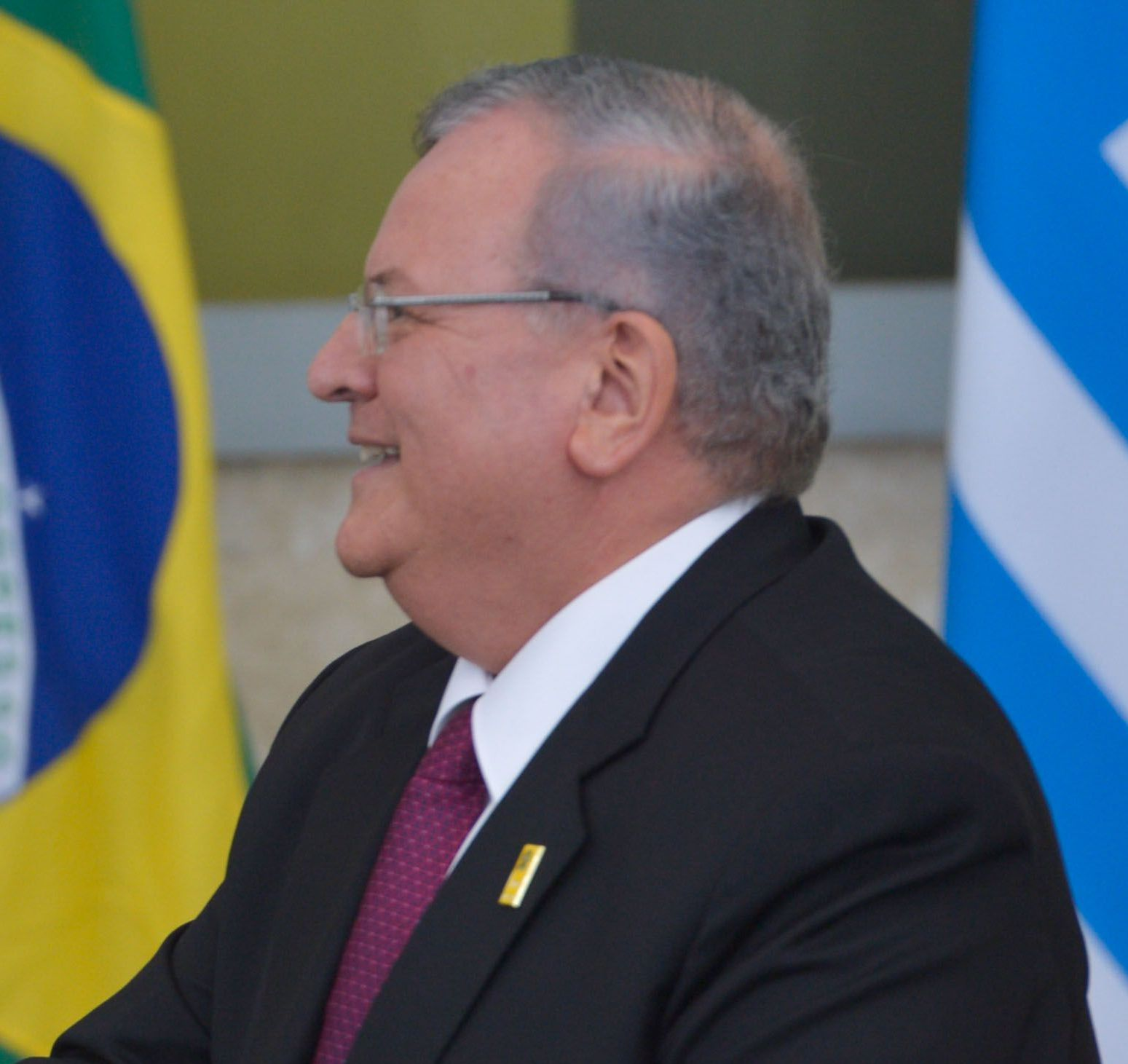

Ambassador of Greece to Brazil
- In office 25 May 2016 – 30 December 2016*
- President: Prokopis Pavlopoulos
- Succeeded by: Vassiliki Lazari (Chargé d' affaires)

Ambassador of Greece to Libya
- In office 2012–2016
- President: Karolos Papoulias

Personal details
- Born: 30 September 1957 Veria, Greece
- Died: c. 26 December 2016 (aged 59) Nova Iguaçu, Brazil
- Spouse: Françoise de Souza Oliveira (m. 2001)
- Children: 1 daughter
- * Term ended on 30 December when his death was confirmed.

Kyriakos Amiridis (Greek: Κυριάκος Αμοιρίδης, 30 September 1957 – c. 26 December 2016) was a Greek career diplomat who served as the Ambassador of Greece to Libya and Brazil. He was reported missing on 28 December 2016 while serving as ambassador to Brazil and his body was found near Rio de Janeiro the next day.

== Career ==
Amiridis began working for the Ministry of Foreign Affairs in Athens in 1985 and was transferred to the Ministry of Macedonia and Thrace in Thessaloniki. His first foreign position was at the Greek Embassy in Belgrade, Yugoslavia from 1988.

In 1993, Amiridis started working in Brussels at the Permanent Representation of Greece to the European Union. He returned to Greece in 1997 to work in the European Foreign Affairs Department at the Foreign Ministry in Athens.

In 2000, Amiridis moved to Brazil to serve as the Consul General in Rio de Janeiro. Three years later, he became Consul General in Rotterdam, the Netherlands.

After returning to Athens in 2008, Amiridis was in 2012 appointed to serve as the Ambassador of Greece to Libya. In 2016 he was chosen to serve as Ambassador to Brazil and he presented his credentials to Brazilian Acting President Michel Temer on 25 May 2016.

== Personal life ==
In 2004 Amiridis married Françoise de Sousa Oliveira, a Brazilian national, and together they had one daughter.

== Death ==
Amiridis was reported missing while on vacation in Rio de Janeiro in late December 2016. He was last heard from on the evening of 26 December when he sent a message from his phone. His wife Françoise reported him missing two days later and claimed that she had been unable to contact him.

On 29 December, Brazilian police said a homicide team had launched an investigation into the ambassador's disappearance. Hours later, a body was found in a burnt-out car underneath an overpass of the Arco Metropolitano do Rio de Janeiro highway near Nova Iguaçu. The vehicle had been rented by Amiridis and the remains were positively identified as those of the ambassador.

On 30 December, Amiridis's wife Françoise and two other people were detained in connection with the ambassador's apparent murder. One of the apprehended figures, military police officer Sérgio Gomes Moreira, is suspected of having been having an affair with Françoise; he confessed to the murder. The roles of the wife and the second man are still unclear. Police believe Amiridis was murdered in an apartment owned by the ambassador in Nova Iguaçu, where the couple and their daughter were staying for the Christmas holiday. Blood stains were found on a sofa in the apartment.

On 29 August 2021, Amiridis's wife was found guilty of planning to murder her husband and given a 31-year prison sentence, while Sérgio Gomes Moreira was sentenced to 22 years in prison after confessing to having committed the murder. The judge described the assassination as "bestial".
