= Irineu Roque Scherer =

- Bishop of Joinville
- Church: Catholic Church
- Diocese: Diocese of Joinville
- In office: 30 May 2007 – 2 July 2016
- Predecessor: Orlando Brandes
- Successor: Francisco Carlos Bach
- Previous post: Bishop of Garanhuns (1998-2007)

Orders
- Ordination: 7 January 1978
- Consecration: 20 June 1998 by Armando Círio

Personal details
- Born: 15 December 1950 Cerro Largo, Rio Grande do Sul, Republic of the United States of Brazil
- Died: 2 July 2016 (aged 65)

Irineu Roque Scherer (15 December 1950 – 2 July 2016) was a Roman Catholic bishop.

Ordained to the priesthood in 1978. Scherer served as bishop of the Roman Catholic Diocese of Garanhuns, Brazil, from 1998 to 2007. He then served as bishop of the Roman Catholic Diocese of Joinville from 2007 until his death.
