= Gilson Alvaristo =

Brazilian cyclist

Personal information
- Born: 27 April 1956 São Paulo, São Paulo, Brazil
- Died: 28 March 2016 (aged 59) Jundiaí, São Paulo, Brazil

Cycling career
- Sport: Cycling

Gilson Alvaristo (27 April 1956 – 28 March 2016) was a Brazilian cyclist. He competed at the 1980 Summer Olympics and the 1984 Summer Olympics.
