= Archdiocese of Joinville =

Catholic ecclesiastical territory

Coordinates: 26.3054°S 48.8458°W

Archdiocese of Joinville Archidioecesis Ioinvillensis Arquidiocese de Joinville
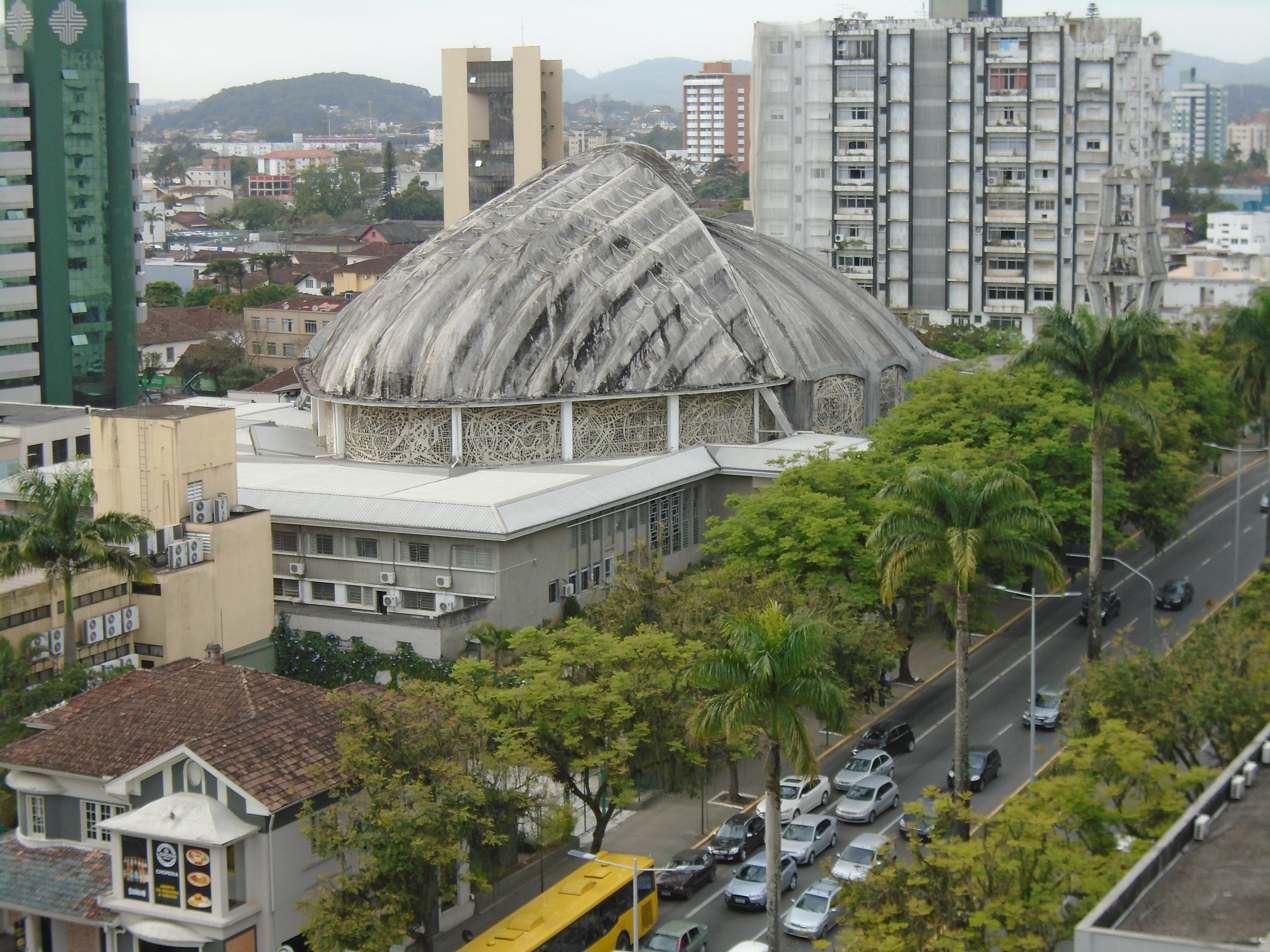
- Cathedral of St Francis Xavier in Joinville in 2016

- Coat of arms

Location
- Country: Brazil
- Ecclesiastical province: Joinville

Statistics
- Area: 9,478 km^{2} (3,659 sq mi)
- Population: Total; Catholics: (as of 2006); 986,000; 641,000 (65.0%)

Information
- Sui iuris church: Latin Church
- Rite: Roman Rite
- Established: 17 January 1927 (98 years ago)
- Cathedral: Cathedral of St Francis Xavier in Joinville

Current leadership
- Pope: Leo XIV
- Metropolitan Archbishop: Francisco Carlos Bach

Website
- www.diocesejoinville.com.br

The Roman Catholic Archdiocese of Joinville (Latin: Archidioecesis Ioinvillensis) is the metropolitan of an ecclesiastical province in Santa Catarina, in the Southern Region of Brazil. It was a suffragan diocese in the ecclesiastical province of Florianópolis, also in Santa Catarina, before the elevation to its current status in 2024.

Its cathedral is Catedral São Francisco Xavier, dedicated to saint Francis Xavier, in the city of Joinville.

== History ==
- Established on 17 January 1927 as Diocese of Joinville, on territory split off from the Diocese of Santa Caterina.
- Lost territories repeatedly : on 1968.11.23 to establish the Diocese of Rio do Sul and on 2000.04.19 to establish the Diocese of Blumenau
- On 5 November 2024, Pope Francis elevated the Diocese of Joinville to a metropolitan archdiocese upon the erection of the Ecclesiastical province of Joinville. The two suffragan dioceses are Rio do Sul and Blumenau.

== Statistics ==
As per 2014, it pastorally served 744,219 Catholics (65.0% of 1,144,952 total) on 9,508 km^{2} in 53 parishes and 5 missions with 118 priests (64 diocesan, 54 religious), 55 deacons, 228 lay religious (104 brothers, 124 sisters) and 26 seminarians.

== Bishops ==
(Latin Church)

=== Episcopal ordinaries ===
Suffragan Bishops of Joinville

- Pio de Freitas Silveira, Congregation of the Mission (C.M., Lazarists) (1929.01.25 – retired 1955.01.19), emeritate as Titular Bishop of Voncaria (1955.01.19 – death 1963.05.19)
  - Apostolic Administrator Inácio Krause (葛樂才), C.M. (1956 – 1957.04.03), while Auxiliary Bishop of Archdiocese of Curitiba (Brazil) (1950 – retired 1963), died 1984; previously only Apostolic Prefect of Shundefu 順德府 (China) (1933.10.26 – 1944.01.13), Titular Bishop of Binda (1944.01.13 – 1946.04.11) as only Apostolic Vicar of Shundefu 順德府 (China) (1944.01.13 – 1946.04.11), promoted first Suffragan Bishop of Shunde 順德 (China) (1946.04.11 – 1950)
- Gregório Warmeling (1957.04.03 – retired 1994.03.09), died 1997
- Orlando Brandes (1994.03.09 – 2006.05.10), next Metropolitan Archbishop of Londrina (Brazil) (2006.05.10 – 2016.11.16), Metropolitan Archbishop of Aparecida (Brazil) (2016.11.16 – ...)
- Irineu Roque Scherer (2007.05.30 – death 2016.07.02), previously Bishop of Garanhuns (Brazil) (1998.04.15 – 2007.05.30)
- Francisco Carlos Bach (2017.04.19 – ...), previously Bishop of Toledo (Brazil) (2005.07.27 – 2012.10.03), Bishop of São José dos Pinhais (Brazil) (2012.10.03 – 2017.04.19) and Apostolic Administrator of Diocese of Paranaguá (Brazil) (2015.04.11 – 2015.11.25).

Metropolitan archbishops of Joinville

- Francisco Carlos Bach (2017.04.19 – ...)

=== Coadjutor bishop ===
- Inácio João Dal Monte, O.F.M. Cap. (1949-1952), did not succeed to see; appointed Bishop of Guaxupé, Minas Gerais

== Suffragan dioceses ==
- Diocese of Rio do Sul
- Diocese of Blumenau

== See also ==
- List of Catholic dioceses in Brazil

== Sources and external links ==
- GCatholic.org, with Google map & satellite photo - data for all sections
- Diocese website (Portuguese)
- Catholic Hierarchy
