= Pedra Branca, Paraíba =

Coordinates: 7°25′37″S 38°04′04″W

- Municipality
- Country: Brazil
- Region: Northeast
- State: Paraíba
- Mesoregion: Sertao Paraibana

Population (2020)
  - Total: 3,802
- Time zone: UTC−3 (BRT)

Pedra Branca, Paraíba is a municipality in the state of Paraíba in the Northeast Region of Brazil.

== See also ==
- List of municipalities in Paraíba
