= Gérson Bergher =

Brazilian politician (1925–2016)

Gérson Bergher (April 9, 1925 – May 30, 2016) was a Brazilian politician. Bergher, the former President of the Brazilian Zionist Organization, was one of Brazil's most prominent Jewish politicians and activists. He served in the Legislative Assembly of Rio de Janeiro, the Legislative Assembly of Guanabara, and the Municipal Chamber of Rio de Janeiro, the city's legislative council. In 2014, Bergher won his most recent re-election to the Legislative Assembly of Rio de Janeiro.

According to reports, Bergher entered politics following the advice and encouragement of Israeli Prime Minister David Ben-Gurion.

He was first elected to the Legislative Assembly of the state of Rio de Janeiro in 1960. According to the Jewish Telegraph Agency, by 1962 Bergher was one of only five Brazilian Jewish politicians to be elected to higher office in the entire country at the time. He later served as a member of the Legislative Assembly of the former state of Guanabara as well.

Bergher served in the Municipal Chamber of Rio de Janeiro during the 1990s and 2000s, including a tenure as President of the Municipal Chamber from 1999 to 2000. In 2006, Bergher was again elected to Legislative Assembly of Rio de Janeiro. Most recently, Bergher won re-election to the state Legislative Assembly in 2014.

Bergher dedicated a bust of former Israeli Prime Minister Yitzhak Rabin in a Rio de Janeiro city park in 1999. The ceremony was attended by Rabin's widow, Leah Rabin. In 2009, Bergher vocally protested the visit of then-Iranian President Mahmoud Ahmadinejad to Brazil, citing Ahmadinejad's denial of the Holocaust.

Bergher died from heart complications at Hospital Samaritan in Botafogo, Rio de Janeiro, on May 30, 2016, at the age of 91.
