= Geneton Moraes Neto =

Brazilian journalist and writer (1956–2016)

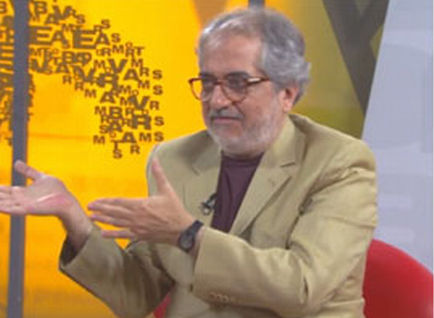
Neto on TV Brasil in 2012.

Geneton Moraes Neto (13 July 1956 – 22 August 2016) was a Brazilian journalist and writer from Pernambuco.

Neto worked as a journalist for over 40 years in print and television. Among other roles, he was a correspondent for O Estado de São Paulo and a prominent figure at GloboNews, where he edited Jornal Nacional.

Neto's book Dossiê Brasília: os segredos dos presidentes (Portuguese for 'Brasília Dossier: Presidential Secrets'), first published in 1997, is a series of interviews with former presidents of Brazil.

He died of an aortic aneurysm.
