= Diocese of Garanhuns =

Catholic ecclesiastical territory

Coordinates: 8.8906°S 36.4920°W

Diocese of Garanhuns Dioecesis Garanhunensis Diocese de Garanhuns

Catholic
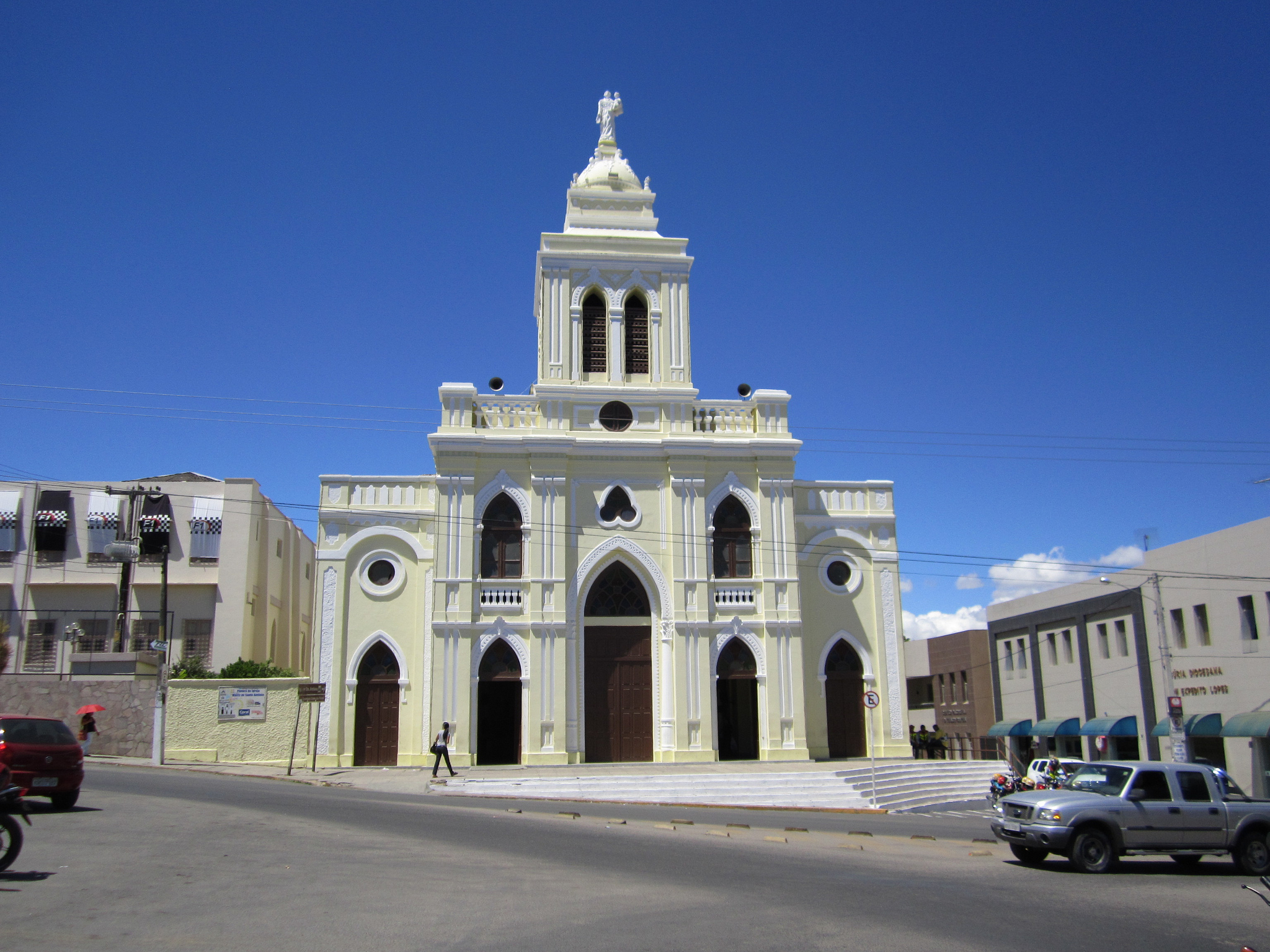
- Catedral Santo Antônio in 2013

Location
- Country: Brazil
- Metropolitan: Archdiocese of Olinda e Recife
- Headquarters: Garanhuns, Pernambuco, Brazil

Statistics
- Area: 8,734 km^{2} (3,372 sq mi)
- Population: Total; Catholics: (as of 2023); 694,162; 629,000 (90.6%)
- Parishes: 37

Information
- Denomination: Catholic Church
- Sui iuris church: Latin Church
- Rite: Roman Rite
- Established: 2 August 1918; 108 years ago
- Cathedral: Catedral Santo Antônio
- Patron saint: Saint Joseph (Diocese); Anthony of Lisbon (Municipality)
- Secular priests: 61 (51 Diocesan, 10 Religious Orders)

Current leadership
- Pope: Leo XIV
- Bishop: Agnaldo Temóteo da Silveira
- Metropolitan Archbishop: Paulo Jackson Nóbrega de Sousa

Website
- www.diocesegaranhuns.org

The Roman Catholic Diocese of Garanhuns (Latin: Dioecesis Garanhunensis) is a diocese located in the city of Garanhuns in the ecclesiastical province of Olinda e Recife in Brazil.

== History ==
- 2 August 1918: Established as Diocese of Garanhuns from the Metropolitan Archdiocese of Olinda e Recife

== Leadership ==
Bishops of Garanhuns (Roman rite)

- João Tavares de Moura (3 July 1919 – 20 July 1928)
- Manoel Antônio de Paiva (2 April 1929 – 19 May 1937)
- Mário de Miranda Vilas-Boas (26 May 1938 – 10 September 1944), appointed Archbishop of Belém do Pará
- Juvêncio de Brito (15 December 1945 – 31 January 1954)
- Francisco Expedito Lopes (24 August 1954 – 1 July 1957)
- José Adelino Dantas (3 May 1958 – 20 February 1967), appointed Bishop of Ruy Barbosa, Bahia
- Milton Correia Pereira (4 August 1967 – 25 April 1973), appointed Coadjutor Archbishop of Manaus, Amazonas
- Tiago Postma (20 June 1974 – 15 March 1995), resigned
- Irineu Roque Scherer (15 April 1998 – 30 May 2007), appointed Bishop of Joinville, Santa Catarina
- Fernando José Monteiro Guimarães, C.Ss.R. (12 March 2008 – 6 August 2014), appointed Military Ordinary of Brazil
- Paulo Jackson Nóbrega de Sousa (20 May 2015 – 14 June 2023), appointed Archbishop of Olinda e Recife, Pernambuco
- Agnaldo Temóteo da Silveira (14 May 2024 – Present)

=== Other priests of this diocese who became bishops ===
- Jaime Mota de Farias (1957-1982), appointed Auxiliary Bishop of Nazaré, Pernambuco in 1982
- Acácio Rodrigues Alves (1949-1962), appointed Bishop of Palmares, Pernambuco
- José Luiz Gomes de Vasconcelos (1989-2012), appointed Auxiliary Bishop of Fortaleza, Ceará in 2012
