= Acácio Rodrigues Alves =

- Bishop of Palmares
- Church: Catholic Church
- Diocese: Diocese of Palmares
- In office: 11 July 1962 – 12 July 2000
- Predecessor: Diocese erected
- Successor: Genival Saraiva de França

Orders
- Ordination: 12 March 1949
- Consecration: 16 September 1962 by José Adelino Dantas

Personal details
- Born: 9 April 1925 Garanhuns, Pernambuco, Republic of the United States of Brazil
- Died: 24 August 2010 (aged 85) Recife, Pernambuco, Brazil

Acácio Rodrigues Alves (9 April 1925 – 24 August 2010) was the first Roman Catholic bishop of the Roman Catholic Diocese of Palmares, Brazil.

Ordained to the priesthood on 12 March 1949, Rodrigues Alves was appointed bishop of the Palmares Diocese on 12 July 1962, by Pope John XXIII and was ordained on 16 September 1962. He retired on 12 July 2000.
