= Francisco Ivens de Sá Dias Branco =

Brazilian businessman

- Born: August 3, 1934; Cedro, Brazil
- Died: June 24, 2016 (aged 81)
- Occupation: Businessman
- Parent(s): Manuel Dias Branco; Maria Vidal de Sa Branco

Francisco Ivens de Sá Dias Branco (August 3, 1934 – June 24, 2016) was a Brazilian businessman and one of the richest people in the world according to Forbes magazine, with an estimated net worth of $4.2 billion in January 2015.

== Personal life ==
He was born on August 3, 1934, in Cedro, Ceará, son of Manuel Dias Branco and Maria Vidal de Sa Branco, both of Portuguese ancestry. Ivens was married to Maria Consuelo Leon Scott Dias Branco, their born children: Francisco Ivens, Francisco Marcos, Claudio Francisco, Maria Regina and Maria das Gracas. He is considered the first billionaire in the Northeast region of Brazil (the poorest).

== Career ==
As a business dynamic and entrepreneurial activities in the sector in which it operates, participated in two specialization courses for the industrial production of biscuits and pasta, made in Germany and England. Promotes travel abroad each year in order to attend Congresses and conferences related to his business. His Business also extend to the construction industry and hospitality. Ivens was chairman of the board of the group.

His performance as a business man received great boost from the relocation of the factory to Fortaleza Br, where he set an enterprise with 62,000 meters square covered area and served as a landmark for the location of various projects on site.

Diversified its activities with persistence and determination, and the group consisting of M. Dias Branco S / A – Com and Ind, M. Adm. And Dias Branco Investments Ltd., White Real Estate Ltd. Days; Idibra Incorporadora Ltda; Idibra Food Products From Maranhão and De Natal Services, Automotive Services Ltd.; Fabripan Industrial Ltda, Hotel Praia Centro S / A; Rural Enterprise Valley Gurguéia S / A; New Town Real Estate Ltd.; Finopan Industrial Ltda, Fasal – St. Anthony Farm Company Ltd. And Ind. E De Vegetables Products Ltd., occupying positions of importance in the management of companies, which employ, as a whole, about 5,000 workers.

== See also ==
- List of Brazilians by net worth
