= Paulo Barreto Menezes =

Brazilian civil engineer and politician

Governor of Sergipe
- In office March 15, 1971 – March 15, 1975
- Preceded by: João de Andrade Garcez
- Succeeded by: José Rollemberg Leite

Personal details
- Born: October 9, 1925 Riachuelo, Sergipe, Brazil
- Died: February 15, 2016 (aged 90) Aracaju, Sergipe

Paulo Barreto Menezes (October 9, 1925 – February 15, 2016) was a Brazilian civil engineer and politician. He served as the governor of the state of Sergipe from 1971 to 1975.

Barreto Menezes died from cardiac arrest at the Unidade de Terapia Intensiva (UTI) hospital in Aracaju, Sergipe, on February 15, 2016, at the age of 90. He was being treated for a pulmonary infection at the time. He was buried in the Colina da Saudade cemetery in Aracaju.

Political offices
Preceded by João de Andrade Garcez	Governor of Sergipe; 1971 – 1975	Succeeded by José Rollemberg Leite
