= Globo (media company) =

Brazilian media and communications company

Globo Comunicação e Participações S.A.
- Logo used since 2024
- Trade name: Globo
- Type: Subsidiary
- Industry: Mass media
- Predecessors: Rede Globo; Globoplay; Globosat; Globo.com; Som Livre; DGCorp
- Founded: 1 January 2020; 6 years ago
- Headquarters: Rio de Janeiro, Brazil
- Area served: Worldwide
- Key people: Paulo Roberto Marinho (President and CEO)
- Products: Television networks; Television production; Pay television; Film production; Internet; Advertising
- Revenue: ▲ R$16.4 billion (2024)
- Operating income: ▲ R$1.55 billion (2024)
- Net income: ▲ R$1.99 billion (2024)
- Total assets: ▲ R$30.9 billion (2024)
- Parent: Grupo Globo
- Divisions: TV Globo; TV Globo Internacional; GloboNews; Telecine; GNT; Multishow; Globoplay Novelas; SporTV; Megapix; Modo Viagem; Gloob; Gloobinho; Estúdios Globo; Globo Filmes
- Subsidiaries: USA Network Latin America (50% with NBCUniversal)
- Website: somos.globo.com

Globo (Brazilian Portuguese: [ɡlobu]) is a Brazilian media and communications company that is part of Grupo Globo. It was founded on 1 January 2020, through the merger of the operations of Rede Globo, Globoplay, Globosat, Globo.com, Som Livre, and DGCorp, which previously operated as independent companies.

The company consists of TV Globo, its flagship free-to-air television network, pay-television channels such as GloboNews, Multishow, GNT, Bis, Gloob, Canal Off, Megapix, SporTV, premium television network Telecine, international channels such as TV Globo Internacional, broadcasting outside of Brazil alongside Globo and Globo Now in Portugal and Globo On in Africa, streaming service Globoplay and websites such as Globo.com.

== History ==
=== Uma Só Globo (2018–2021) ===
On 24 September 2018, Grupo Globo announced the launch of the "Uma Só Globo" (English: "One Globo") project, which aimed to integrate the operations of its media subsidiaries such as Rede Globo, Globoplay, Globosat, Globo.com, Som Livre, and DGCorp into a single company within three years. This unified entity would operate under the corporate name Globo Comunicações e Participações S.A. and the brand name Globo. Sister companies such as Editora Globo, Infoglobo (which would later merge its operations with Editora Globo), Sistema Globo de Rádio, and Fundação Roberto Marinho were not included in the project and continued operating independently. The restructuring process was carried out with consulting firm Accenture.

Through this initiative, Globo sought to reduce fixed costs in line with its net income, increase operational agility, and better prepare to face competition from emerging global media platforms, which were increasingly concentrated. This restructuring led to controversy, particularly due to mass layoffs across the former companies. In the case of Rede Globo, the dismissal of a significant portion of its long-standing on-screen talent drew public attention. The company transitioned to project-based contracts — a model that had been under consideration for more than 30 years.

The merger also had cultural and managerial implications. According to a survey by the website NaTelinha, while the former Globosat was seen as youthful, innovative, and modern, Rede Globo had a more bureaucratic image. This perception had been evident since 2013, when the broadcast network consulted viewers and found that younger audiences viewed it as "a wealthy, elegant, and austere lady, lacking novelty and with a rigid programming structure." This prompted the company to implement gradual changes in its communication style and visual identity.

On 4 January 2021, Globo officially unveiled its new brand, marking the unification of its broadcast television, pay TV, streaming, and digital platforms. The visual identity was developed by a multidisciplinary team and was shaped by public feedback.

==== Mediatech company ====
One of the main points of the restructuring is that it would become a mediatech company, envisioning a future more focused on digital and technological spheres. CEO of Grupo Globo Jorge Nóbrega argued: "Our linear channels speak to more than 100 million people every day in Brazil, which demonstrates the enormous relevance of television as a contemporary reality, but the concept of what television is is expanding rapidly."

On 7 April 2021, a 7-year agreement with Google Cloud was announced. The partnership includes the migration of 100% of the data from its own data centers to the cloud owned by Google, as well as its content, products and services of the new company; and opens up possibilities for the use of artificial intelligence and machine learning, including in the development of solutions and in Globo's innovation process.

=== Sale of Som Livre ===
As part of the new company's restructuring, on 18 November 2020, CEO of Grupo Globo Jorge Nóbrega announced that he intended to sell the record label Som Livre. On the same day, the brand was placed in a valuation process, to make it available to the market. Global distributor Believe was one of those interested in the acquisition, however, on 1 April 2021, it was announced that the record label was acquired by Sony Music, in a deal of transaction worth an estimated US$255 million. At the time of the deal, Nobrega said that "We wanted to make sure that this deal would preserve everything that Som Livre represents for the Brazilian people." The acquisition was approved by Brazilian competition regulator Administrative Council for Economic Defense (CADE) on 23 February 2022, and was completed on 4 March 2022.

=== Acquisition of Eletromidia ===
In 2023, Globo announces its decision to enter out-of-home (outdoor) advertising industry with the acquisition of Eletromidia, beginning with the acquisition of 8.57% stake of the company from Alexandre Guerrero Martins. In November 2024, Globo becoming a controlling shareholder of Eletromidia with the acquisition of 47.09% stake of the company.

== Brands and divisions ==
=== Free-to-air television ===
- TV Globo
  - TV Globo DF
  - TV Globo Minas
  - TV Globo Pernambuco
  - TV Globo Rio
  - TV Globo São Paulo
- Futura

=== Pay television ===
- Bis
- Canal Brasil
- GloboNews
- Globoplay Novelas
- Gloob
- GNT
- Multishow
- SporTV
- TV Globo Internacional
  - Globo Portugal
    - Globo Now
  - Globo On (Africa)

=== Pay-per-view ===
- Premiere
- BBB Pay-per-view
- Telecine
- Combate

=== Joint ventures ===
- NBCUniversal International Networks and Direct-to-Consumer Brasil (with Comcast/NBCUniversal)
  - Universal TV
  - Studio Universal
  - USA
- with Playboy do Brasil
  - Playboy TV
  - Sexy Hot
  - Sextreme
  - Venus

=== Film and television production ===
- Estúdios Globo
- Esporte Globo
- Globo Filmes
- Jornalismo Globo

=== Internet ===
- Globo.com
  - G1
- Globoplay

=== Former assets ===
- Som Livre (Acquired by Sony Music in April 2021)

== Free and open source software ==
Globo is also recognized for its work in the technology field, developing and maintaining various open source and free software projects that are used both internally and by developer communities around the world. Some of its main projects include:

Thumbor – a smart image resizing service widely used for web image optimization. Thumbor allows real-time cropping, resizing, and filtering of images based on the URL.

Tsuru – an open source Platform as a Service (PaaS) that simplifies the deployment, scalability, and management of applications in cloud environments. Designed with developers in mind, Tsuru abstracts infrastructure and accelerates the software delivery cycle, using Kubernetes as a container orchestrator for scalable and automated application management.

Clappr – an extensible media player built with JavaScript, used for audio and video streaming across multiple platforms. Clappr is known for its flexibility and ease of integration into web projects.
