= Globoplay =

Brazilian video streaming service

- Website type: Video on demand, OTT, live streaming
- Available in: Portuguese
- Predecessors: Globo.com Vídeo (2000–2001); Globo Media Center (2001–2006); Globo Vídeos (2006–2012); Globo.tv (2012–2015)
- Headquarters: Rio de Janeiro, {{{location_country}}}
- Country of origin: Brazil
- Area served: Australia, Austria, Belgium, Brazil, Canada, Denmark, Finland, France, Germany, Greece, Ireland, Italy, Japan, Luxembourg, Netherlands, Norway, Portugal, Spain, Sweden, Switzerland, United Kingdom, and United States
- Owner: Globo
- Founder: José Roberto Marinho
- CEO: Manuel Belmar
- Industry: Entertainment; mass media
- Products: Streaming media; video on demand; digital distribution
- Services: Television production; Television distribution
- Website: globoplay.globo.com
- Registration: Limited free access, Monthly subscription required to access exclusive content
- Launched: 3 November 2015
- Current status: Active

Globoplay is a Brazilian subscription video on-demand over-the-top streaming service owned by Globo, a division of Grupo Globo. The service primarily distributes films and television series produced by Estúdios Globo with the service also hosting content from other providers, content add-ons, live sporting events, and video rental and purchasing services. It was created on 26 October 2015, and launched in Brazil on November 3 of the same year. In 2020, it reached the milestone of 20 million registered users and became the most used national streaming service in Brazil.

In September 2021, it was announced that Globoplay would be released in Canada and in more than 20 European countries, such as Italy, France, Switzerland, Germany, Spain, Portugal and United Kingdom starting 14 October 2021.

== Programming ==
Logo of Globoplay used from 2018 to 2020.

Logo of Globoplay used from 2020 to 2025.

Globoplay offers video streaming or on-demand content of programs from Globo's archived library as well as original programs and exclusive international programs. Live broadcasting of Globo and some of its affiliates is also available, albeit users have to configure their accounts so the location is inside of the allowed broadcasting area, composed of 115 affiliates operating inside 26 Brazilian states. If the user has their account configured to have a location outside of those affiliates, or if they live outside Brazil and have not configured a specific location, the live broadcasting feature automatically becomes unavailable.

=== Original programming ===
The service has already announced that it intends to invest in projects focused solely on the digital platform, with exclusive content. The first sample was the release of a special of the telenovela Totalmente Demais in 2015 and a spin-off of it in 2016.

Since 2017, to promote the reality television show Big Brother Brasil, Globoplay streams—in conjunction with the website GShow—the program #RedeBBB and the following year, after the ending of the 18th season, the special BBB18: Fogo no Parquinho.

In August 2018, it was announced that Globoplay would distribute original content series commissioned by TV Globo exclusively for the service. The first slate of series released that year under the "Globoplay Originals" banner included Além da Ilha, Assédio and Ilha de Ferro.

In August 2020, Globo made Premiere available through an exclusive deal (no cable TV needed). In September, announced that all Globosat (now, Canais Globo) channels would become available on the platform even for those without a cable TV deal. The exclusive package guarantees access to all Globoplay and Canais Globo content with the option the buy add-ons like Premiere, Combate and Telecine.

In November, closed an exclusive deal with The Walt Disney Company, creating an exclusive deal with Disney+. The package guarantees access to all Globoplay and Disney+ content.

=== Exclusive television distribution ===
Globoplay has bought exclusive and non-exclusive distribution rights to stream international shows in Brazil. The ABC medical drama television series The Good Doctor was released on 22 August 2018, as the first international exclusive show of the service.

=== Classic programming from TV Globo ===
Telenovelas broadcast by TV Globo after 2009 were already available on the service, including those rerunned in the Vale a Pena Ver de Novo programming block. In May 2020, Globoplay launched a project to rescue classic programming from TV Globo's library, with the inclusion of soap operas, miniseries and seasons of Malhação prior to 2010. Since then, every two weeks, a new title has been released for streaming.

=== Channels ===
The platform makes its Canais Globo portfolio available, with simultaneous transmission—OTT—and on demand, integrating the former Canais Globosat platform, today Canais Globo. In 2022, it culminated in the integration of linear channels and on-demand content from the Rede Telecine, and Telecine's own streaming was deactivated, in the same year the partnership between Lionsgate Entertainment was announced, providing a quality experience and with more than 1,200 titles.

Available channels are: TV Globo, Multishow, GloboNews, SporTV, SporTV2, SporTV3, SporTV4, GNT, Viva, Gloob, Gloobinho, Megapix, Universal+, Canal Brasil, Canal Off, Bis, Modo Viagem, Canal Futura, CBN National, CBN SP, CBN RJ, Telecine, Premiere and Combate.

== International expansion ==
Abroad, only Globoplay is available for contracting. Globoplay + live channels is available for contracting and consumption only in Brazil. Despite this, for the international market, the contents and live feeds of the channels TV Globo Internacional, Multishow, GloboNews, GNT, Globoplay Novelas, SporTV and Premiere are available.

With the launch of Globoplay in Europe, the Globo Internacional satellite/cable feed was discontinued in the continent, except in Portugal where Globo maintains three channels on the air: Globo Portugal, PFC and Globo Now, a repeater of the signal from GloboNews. Programs that are being shown on Portuguese SIC channel will not enter the platform's catalog.

Launch rollout timeline
Release date	Country/territory
3 November 2015	Brazil
19 January 2020	United States
23 October 2021	Austria
23 October 2021	Belgium
23 October 2021	Canada
23 October 2021	Denmark
23 October 2021	Finland
23 October 2021	France
23 October 2021	Germany
23 October 2021	Greece
23 October 2021	Ireland
23 October 2021	Italy
23 October 2021	Luxembourg
23 October 2021	Netherlands
23 October 2021	Norway
23 October 2021	Portugal
23 October 2021	Spain
23 October 2021	Sweden
23 October 2021	Switzerland
23 October 2021	United Kingdom
6 February 2022	Japan
25 February 2022	Australia
