= Globo Now =

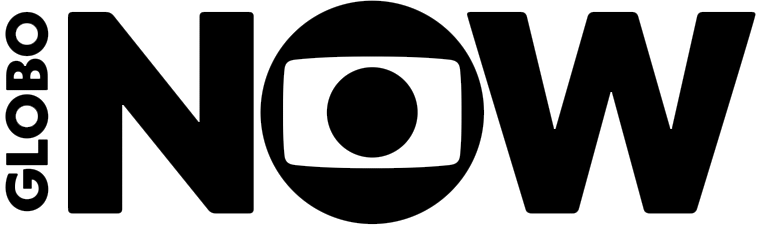
- Logo used since 2018
- Type: Pay television channel
- Country: Portugal
- Broadcast area: Lisbon, Portugal

Programming
- Language: Portuguese
- Picture format: 576i SDTV

Ownership
- Owner: Grupo Globo
- Parent: TV Globo Internacional
- Key people: Roberto Irineu Marinho (president)

History
- Founded: 1998; 28 years ago
- Former names: GNT Portugal (1998-2007); TV Globo Portugal (2007-2013); Globo Premium (2013-2018)

Globo Now is a subsidiary of Globo, a Brazilian television network. It produces and distributes programming from Brazil in Portugal and Europe.

In Portugal, it distributes three channels, two of which are premium channels. Since 1998 and prior to this establishment, Globo aired GNT Portugal and Canal Brasil in Portugal, which are currently unavailable. Despite GNT was one of the most watched channels in Portugal, it stopped being aired in Portugal in 2006 when the contract expired and Brazilian rival network Rede Record moved in. It soon returned to Portugal, with a premium channel branded as TV Globo Portugal on 1 October 2007, renamed Globo Premium on 8 February 2013 after the launch of the basic channel TV Globo Portugal and Globo Now on 17 April 2018 until 2020 when it was replaced by GloboNews. On October 17, 2011, the Rede Globo subsidiary was inaugurated in Lisbon.

== Channels ==
- Globo (general entertainment, HD version available)
- GloboNews (Globo Now until 2020)
- PFC (Brazilian football channel, premium channel across platforms)
- Globo Europa (only through Globoplay since 31 December 2021)
- Globo Africa (exclusive to ZAP in Angola and Mozambique, HD version available)
- Globo ON (old content, exclusive to ZAP in Angola and Mozambique)
