= Gloobinho =

Brazilian pay television channel

- Country: Brazil
- Headquarters: Rio de Janeiro, Brazil

Programming
- Languages: Brazilian Portuguese; English (selected programs)
- Picture format: HDTV 1080i; SDTV 480i (downscaled)

Ownership
- Owner: Canais Globo
- Parent: Grupo Globo
- Sister channels: Gloob; GNT; Multishow; TV Globo

History
- Launched: 17 October 2017; 8 years ago
- Replaced: TV Globinho

Links
- Webcast: globoplay.globo.com (available only in Brazil, subscription required)

Gloobinho is a Brazilian pay television preschool channel owned by Globo, a Grupo Globo company that in 2020 unified TV Globo, Globo.com, DGCorp (Corporate Management Board) and Globosat (now called Canals Globo). It is Gloob's preschool version, at children from 2 to 5 years old.

The channel's programming is also available on demand through the channel's own platform, "Gloobinho Play".

On 3 August 2017, the newspaper 'Agora São Paulo' announced that the former Globosat, (now Canais Globo), would be creating a new channel called Gloobinho, which would debut in October. Initially, the premiere date was scheduled for 3 October, but due to technical issues, the channel debuted lately on 17 October that year.

In its programming, most productions are foreign. The following productions would air until November 2018, Monday through Sunday, at least once a day.

== See also ==
- Gloob
