= Telecine (Brazil) =

Brazilian TV network

Telecine Programação de Filmes Ltda.
- Broadcast area: Brazil; International
- Headquarters: Avenida das Américas, 1650, Barra da Tijuca, Rio de Janeiro, Brazil

Programming
- Languages: Dubbed Brazilian Portuguese, or Original audio with subtitles
- Picture format: 1080i (16:9 HDTV) (HD feed downgraded to letterboxed 480i for SDTV sets)

Ownership
- Owner: Globo (Grupo Globo)
- Sister channels: Megapix, SporTV, GNT, GloboNews, Multishow, Gloob

History
- Launched: 1991 (original Telecine channel); 1997 (Telecine Action, Touch, Pipoca and Cult, as Telecine 2-5); October 22, 2010 (Telecine Fun); July 2012 (Telecine Play); August 2012 (Telecine On Demand)
- Former names: Rede Telecine

Links
- Website: telecine.globo.com

Former Telecine Action Logo.

Former Telecine Pipoca Logo.

Former Telecine Touch Logo.

Former Telecine Premium Logo.

Former Telecine Fun Logo.

Telecine is a Brazilian premium television network owned by Globo, a division of Grupo Globo. Until 2024, the company was co-owned by Hollywood studios.

The network consists of six channels, airing primarily theatrically released motion pictures from its studio owners and other Brazilian distributors, such as Globo Filmes, Paris Filmes, Califórnia Filmes, and Europa Filmes, as well as having the premium second-run content rights to Sony Pictures and Warner Bros. Pictures (first-run rights are held by its main competitor HBO, both part of Warner Bros. Discovery).

== Telecine Channels ==
=== Telecine Premium ===
The flagship channel, one of the first four Globosat channels (as Telecine, with Multishow, GNT and TopSport – now SporTV), focused on recent film releases of many genres. Renamed Telecine 1 in 1997, with the launch of the other four channels, and several years later, was renamed once again to its current name.

At launch, Telecine signed contracts with numerous production companies, from majors (Columbia, Warner Bros., Paramount, MGM) to independent studios (Orion, Savern, New World) as well as an initial package of 150 Brazilian titles. In its first year, the channel benefitted from TV Globo's extensive back catalog of 10,000 titles, whose permanent rights were already acquired. Since there were no advertisements in its initial phase, slots between movies were being filled up with trivia segments, interviews and news from an exclusive reporter in Hollywood. It was the only channel of the network until 1997, when it was upgraded to a five-channel package.

=== Telecine Action ===
Originally Telecine 2, dedicated to action, adventure, thriller, horror and some adult films, also featured series such as Numb3rs. Starting in February 2011, the channel started offering dual-audio (original audio by default and dubbed in Portuguese as an option) and electronic subtitles. Later that year, the channel changed its language options to Portuguese audio and subtitles turned off by default (can be turned on by the user) and original audio with subtitles as an option.

=== Telecine Touch ===
Originally Telecine 3 and later Telecine Emotion, was dedicated to dramatic and romantic films, until it was renamed Telecine Light, when the channel started featuring some comedy films, previously featured on Telecine 4/Happy. On October 22, 2010, the channel was once again renamed to Telecine Touch, featuring films that "touch" the channel's audience. Basically, the channel reverted to Telecine 3/Emotion's format of drama and romance.

=== Telecine Pipoca ===
Originally Telecine 4 and later Telecine Happy, was dedicated to family and comedy films. Its current incarnation, Telecine Pipoca ("pipoca" is Portuguese for "popcorn"), is based on recent releases, dubbed in Portuguese.

=== Telecine Cult ===
On its original incarnation, Telecine 5 and later Telecine Classic, it was dedicated to classic film. Currently, the channel features independent, alternative and "cult" films, also running some classic films.

=== Telecine Fun ===
The sixth standard-definition Telecine network, Telecine Fun was launched on October 22, 2010, featuring comedy films, romantic comedies and animated films, previously featured on Telecine 4/Happy (now Telecine Pipoca) and Telecine Light (now Telecine Touch).

=== Language options ===
Five of the networks feature dual-audio and electronic subtitles. Telecine Premium has original audio and Portuguese subtitles turned on by default (can be turned off by the user), with the dubbed version as an option. Telecine Pipoca, Action, Touch and Fun have audio dubbed in Portuguese with subtitles turned off by default (can be turned on by the user), with the original audio as an option. The exception is Telecine Cult, which only features the original audio, subtitled in Portuguese.

=== Transition to HD ===
In April 2009, Telecine launched its first high-definition channel, Telecine HD, featuring recent releases, and most premieres were simulcasted on Telecine Premium, but Telecine HD wasn't a full simulcast of Telecine Premium, with a different programming, instead having an all-HD lineup, with 5.1 audio.

On October 22, 2010, Telecine HD was replaced with a high-definition simulcast of Telecine Premium. On January 31, 2010, the HD version of Telecine Pipoca was launched, following the same all-HD and simulcasted premieres model, though it became a full simulcast on October 22, 2010. An HD simulcast of Telecine Action was launched on November 1, 2010. HD simulcasts of Telecine Touch and Telecine Fun were launched on December 8, 2011. With the launch of an HD simulcast of Telecine Cult on December 4, 2012, since then all six Telecine networks are available in high-definition for subscribers.

== Streaming ==
=== Globoplay + Telecine ===
Following the merge of assets in Grupo Globo, Telecine own streaming service, Telecine Play, was folded in Globoplay portfolio as an premium channel available for purchase to all globoplay subscribers. Offers films which Telecine has the rights for use in streaming platforms.

=== Former Streaming and VOD ===
==== Telecine On Demand ====
Offered pay-per-view film rentals as soon as the titles were released on home video platforms, such as Blu-ray. Was available on pay-TV in Claro TV, SKY and Vivo, and on Telecine own online platform.

==== Telecine Play ====
Included with the Telecine subscription for NET, CLARO TV, SKY, OI TV, GVT and Vivo customers, offered films which Telecine has the rights, on desktop and notebook computers with Silverlight installed, iOS-based devices (iPhone, iPod Touch, iPad) and Android-based smartphones.

== Telecine Productions ==
Telecine regularly is attached with new productions in the Brazilian local market, especially eyeing future premium-TV rights. Some international films were also produced under Telecine banner, for example: Marco Bellocchio's The Traitor, a 2019 Italian production.

=== Selected Telecine Productions ===
- Elite Squad: The Enemy Within (2010)
- The Clown (2011)
- Brazilian Western (2013)
- Bacurau (2019)
- The Traitor (2019)
