= IPCTV =

Japan
- City: Tokyo
- Channels: Digital: SKY PerfecTV: Channel 514

Programming
- Affiliations: Globo International Network

Ownership
- Owner: IPC World Inc. Grupo Globo

History
- Founded: 7 September 1995
- First air date: 1 October 1996
- Last air date: 31 March 2019
- Former affiliations: TVE Internacional (2001-2010); RecordTV Internacional (2001-2010)

Links
- Website: www.ipctv.jp

IPCTV was a Japanese television channel serving the Brazilian community in Japan, owned by IPC World Inc. It aired on channel 514 of the pay TV provider SKY PerfecTV and was affiliated to TV Globo Internacional. It was the first Brazilian TV station to be based outside of Brazil.

== History ==
The station was founded on 7 September 1995 as "PLC Television Network Corporation" and from 1 October 1996 began transmitting its satellite signal by SKY PerfecTV (at the time PerfecTV). Negotiations with Globo started since September 1995; in addition to airing Globo programming, educational programming sourced from the public networks (TVE Brasil and at a later stage TV Cultura) were also carried. IPC's "Brazil Channel" was not the only channel provided by the company, as there was also an agreement with the Miami-based SUR (Sistema Unido de Retransmisión), which was carried on a separate channel with a separate subscription fee.

The plan to launch the channel was impulsed by the growing market of recordings of Brazilian programs from VHS tapes sent by relatives. Nearly one year after the channel launched, it had 210,000 subscribers, already produced local programming and relayed Jornal da Band, in addition to Jornal Nacional.

The channel was the initiative of Yoshio Muranaga, who founded the International Press newspaper in the early 90s. Muranaga's company signed a contract with Globo to broadcast its programs via subscription satellite TV. A second channel with Latin American programming was also carried. The two channels had accumulated 24,000 subscribers by June 1998, while Muranaga had earned more than US$2 million from subscriptions.

In 2001, the channel was renamed IPCTV and retransmitted TVE Internacional on channel 332, RecordTV Internacional on channel 333, Globo Internacional on channel 334.

In 2006, channel 333, which had a high amount of in-house productions, was the most-viewed channel of the network.

As of August 2007, IPCTV was renamed as IPC World TV.

In 2010, the three channels were closed and IPC World TV was renamed IPCTV and became affiliated only with Globo, broadcasting on channel 514 on SKY PerfecTV. In addition, it launched the in-house produced news program JPTV; the first "PraçaTV" (regional news) outside Brazil.

On 2 December 2014, IPCTV became a mere repeater of TV Globo International, and has no more local programming. At this point, "JPTV" was the only local program in production and was replaced by the noon edition of SPTV, produced by TV Globo São Paulo.

On 31 March 2019, IPCTV was officially closed due to the termination of Globo's contract for an indefinite period.
