= Globosat =

Cable/satellite channels division of Grupo Globo

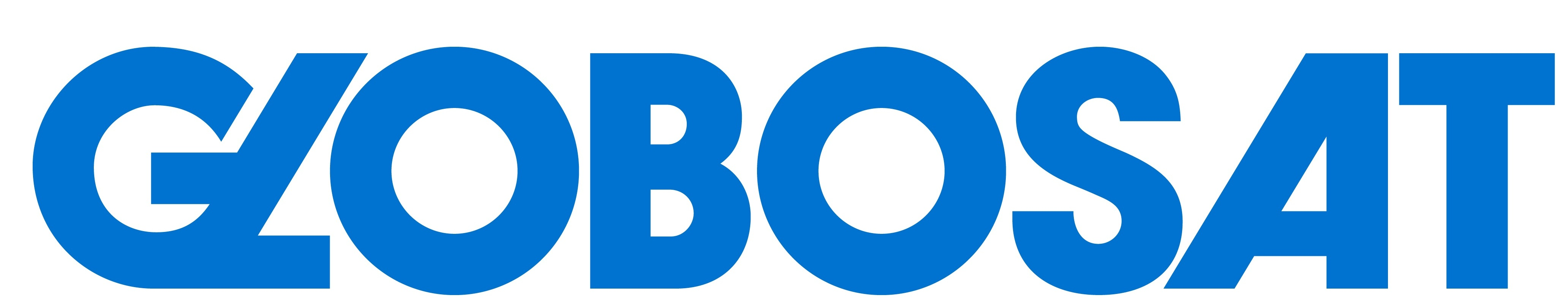

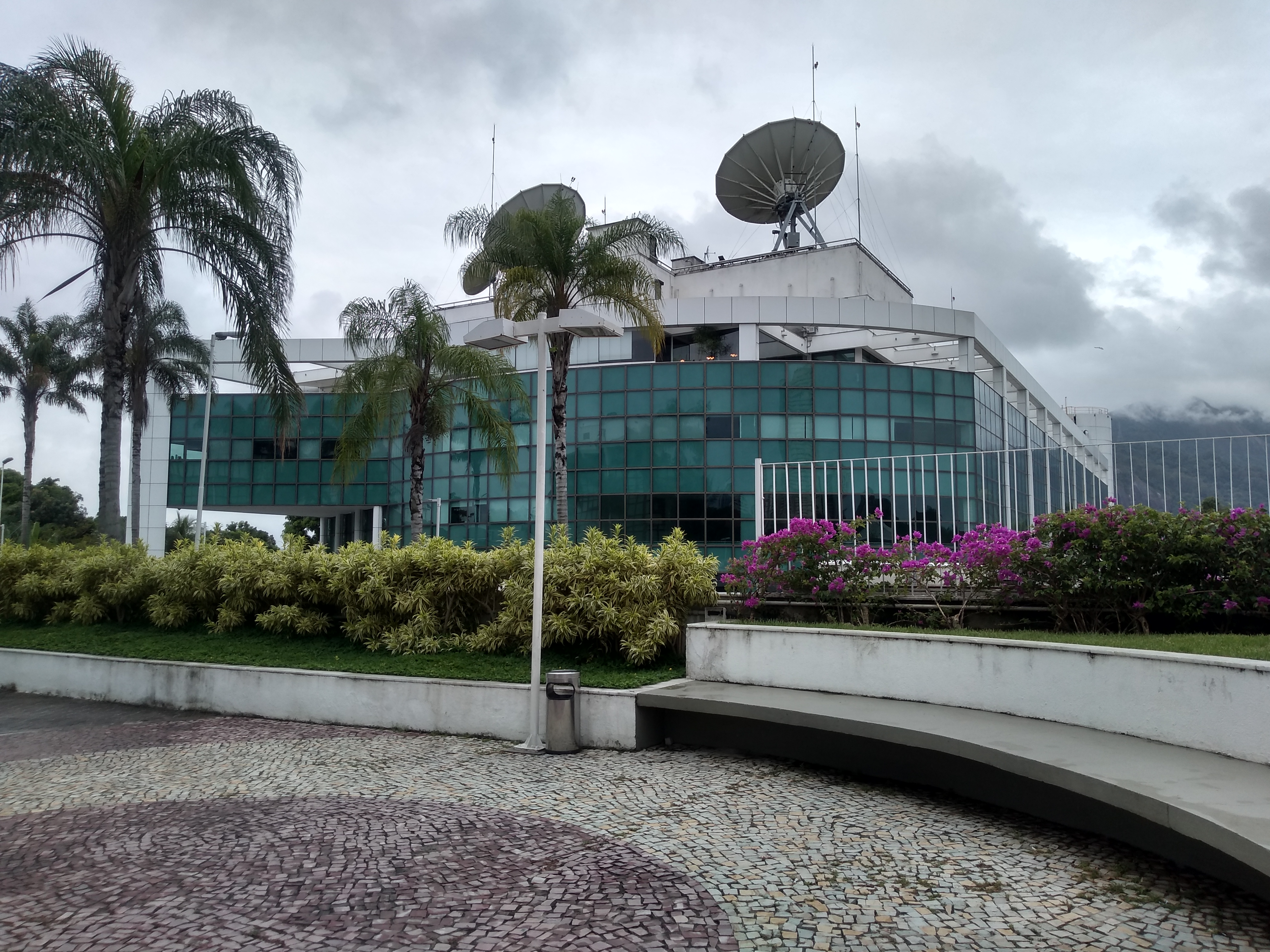
- Headquarters in Rio de Janeiro
- Formerly: Globosat Programadora Ltda. (1991-2019)
- Type: Subsidiary
- Industry: Entertainment; Cable Television; Interactive Media
- Founded: November 10, 1991; 35 years ago (as Globosat)
- Founder: Joseph Wallach; Roberto Irineu Marinho; José Bonifácio Sobrinho
- Defunct: December 31st, 2019 (as a separate company); September 30th, 2020 (brand)
- Fate: Shut down and merged with other selected Grupo Globo subsidiaries to form Globo Comunicação e Participações S.A. (doing business as Globo) as part of the "Uma Só Globo" reorganization
- Successor: Globo (media company)
- Headquarters: Rio de Janeiro, Brazil
- Area served: Brazil
- Key people: Alberto Pecegueiro (CEO)
- Number of employees: 1,480
- Parent: Grupo Globo
- Divisions: Globo News; Telecine; GNT; Multishow; Canal Viva; SporTV; Megapix; Modo Viagem; Gloob; Gloobinho
- Website: canaisglobosat.globo.com

Globosat was a Brazilian pay television content service, part of Grupo Globo. Established in 1991, after the creation of subscription television services in Brazil, with 29 channels and over 1,000 employees, it is the largest pay television content provider in Brazil, as well as of Latin America, comprising a domestic audience of 45 million viewers distributed among more than 15 million households.

== History ==
In 1993, Globosat split its content generation and distribution businesses. Cable TV sales and distribution were assigned to Net Brasil, which was also responsible for installing cable networks in selected cities. Nowadays, NET, which was succeeded by Claro Brasil's TV operations, is responsible for the cable network programming in those cities as well.

In the later years, content production and programming remained with Globosat, was later renamed to Canais Globosat. Globosat also operated a channel in Portugal, TV Globo Portugal (part of TV Globo Internacional), having earlier operated a similar channel, GNT Portugal, until 2006.

In late December 2019, Globosat was shut down as a separate company, and on January 1st, 2020, Globosat's remaining assets later merged with other selected Grupo Globo subsidiaries to form a single company named Globo as part of the "Uma Só Globo" reorganization. The Globosat brand lasted until September 2020, when it was officially discontinued following the rebranding of Globosat Play to the Canais Globo application.

== Canais Globo's networks ==
=== Current networks ===
- TV Globo (free-to-air)
  - Globo HD
- Modo Viagem
- Canal Brasil^{2}
- GNT
- Gloob
- Gloobinho
- Multishow
- Bis
- Canal OFF

Streaming

- Globoplay
- Canais Globo app (formerly known as MUU and Globosat Play, will be defunct soon)
- Combate app
- Premiere app
- Sexy Hot

Adult content

- Playboy TV
- Sextreme
- Sexy Hot
- Venus

In association with Globo

- Canal Viva
- Globo News
- Globo Internacional
- Canal Futura*

*Operated by Fundação Roberto Marinho.

Films and Series

- Rede Telecine
  - Telecine HD
  - Telecine Action
  - Telecine Cult
  - Telecine Fun
  - Telecine Pipoca
  - Telecine Premium
  - Telecine Touch
- Megapix
- NBCUniversal International Networks Brasil (joint-venture with Comcast/NBCUniversal)
  - Universal TV
  - Studio Universal
  - Syfy

Sports

- SporTV
- SporTV 2
- SporTV 3
- SporTV 4
- SporTV 5
- SporTV+
- Combate
- Premiere
- PFC Internacional

^{1} - Joint-venture with Disney, Universal Studios, Metro-Goldwyn-Mayer and Paramount Pictures.

^{2} - Joint-venture with a group of Brazilian filmmakers.

^{3} - Playboy do Brasil is a joint-venture created from the association between Globosat and Playboy TV Latin America.

=== Former networks ===
- Shoptime (currently owned by Americanas) - home shopping
- Premiere Filmes (pay-per-view) new film releases
- Canal Rural (formerly a joint-venture with Grupo RBS, later owned only by RBS, now part of J&F Investimentos) - agrochannel
- Premiere Rural (pay-per-view) rodeos and agrochannel
- Private (joint-venture with Playboy do Brasil) - adult content
- ForMan (joint-venture with Playboy do Brasil) - adult content
- +Bis (on demand)
- Telecine Zone (on demand)
- Receitas GNT (on demand)
- Sexy Hot 360° (on demand)
- Big Brother Brasil Play
- Bis Play
- Canal Brasil Play
- Canal OFF Play
- Globo News Play
- Gloob Play
- Gloobinho Play
- GNT Play
- Mais Globosat Play
- Megapix Play
- Multishow Play
- SporTV Play
- Studio Universal Play
- Syfy Play
- Universal TV Play
- Viva Play
- Philos TV
- Telecine app
