= TV Globo On =

- Country: Brazil
- Broadcast area: Angola; Mozambique

Programming
- Language: Portuguese
- Picture format: 1080i HDTV (downscaled to 16:9 576i for the SDTV feed)

Ownership
- Owner: Globo Portugal (Globo)
- Sister channels: TV Globo Internacional

History
- Launched: 1 July 2015
- Former names: Globo On (2015-2026)

Links
- Website: redeglobo.globo.com/on

TV Globo On is a Brazilian-produced television channel owned by Grupo Globo, catering to the markets of Angola and Mozambique. A sister outlet to TV Globo Internacional's African feed, the channel started broadcasting on July 1, 2015 and airs several telenovelas and TV series produced by Globo.

== History ==
The channel was created following the lack of renewal of Globo's contract with DStv, its longtime African partner, set to expire on June 30, 2015. In May 2015, it signed a contract with ZAP, which assured the exclusivity of its distribution, not only of Globo Internacional África, but also of an all-new channel, Globo On. The agreement also caused a rift among female subscribers, who were used to watching Globo Internacional's programming.

Before the launch, Globo Internacional promoted a large-scale advertising campaign in Angola, the largest it invested there in its history. On June 19, Globo promoted a press conference and a party celebrating the new partnership. On launch night (July 1), a special edition of Vídeo Show produced in both countries aired.

During the Big Brother Brasil season, the channel also airs its eviction shows on Thursdays. In mid-2024, the channel aired repeats of Estrela da Casa from the previous day, as seen on Globo Internacional.
