= Globoplay Novelas =

- Country: Brazil
- Headquarters: Rio de Janeiro (RJ)

Programming
- Language: Portuguese
- Picture format: 1080i HDTV (downgraded to letterboxed 480i for the SDTV feed)

Ownership
- Owner: Canais Globo (Globo)

History
- Launched: 18 May 2010; 15 years ago
- Former names: Canal Viva (2010–2025) (Note: With the change in graphics in 2012, the channel began to be called only Viva (in capital letters). However, in news articles, including those from Grupo Globo media and on social media, the name Canal Viva was still used.)

Links
- Webcast: globoplay.globo.com (subscription required)

Globoplay Novelas is a Brazilian pay television channel owned by the Canais Globo unit of Globo, a subsidiary of Grupo Globo.

The channel was originally launched on May 18, 2010 as Canal Viva (or simply Viva), and featured miniseries, dubbed films, telenovelas, television series and variety programs from TV Globo and the pay channel GNT on alternative schedules. In 2025, Viva was relaunched as Globoplay Novelas. The relaunch pivoted the channel towards a focus on telenovelas.

== History ==
=== Canal Viva or simply Viva (2010–2025) ===
Canal Viva's final logo, used between 2018 and 2025.

On 18 May 2010, Viva was launched by the pay television company Canais Globo, formerly Globosat. Since its debut, the channel has dedicated a large part of its programming to television programs originally shown on TV Globo. The channel's initial aim was to reach an audience of women over 35, from all social classes.

The programming schedule, at the time of its launch, consisted of reruns of telenovelas and other programs from TV Globo's archive and reruns of current programs from TV Globo and the GNT channel at alternative times, as well as dubbed imported shows.

Many comedy programs from TV Globo have also been shown on the channel throughout its history, some of which are still being shown today: A Turma do Didi, Aventuras de Didi, Chico Total, A Comédia da Vida Privada, TV Pirata, Viva o Gordo, Brasil Legal, Toma Lá, Dá Cá, Minha Nada Mole Vida, Casos e Acasos, Sob Nova Direção, Ó Pai, Ó, Dicas de um Sedutor, Faça Sua História, O Belo e as Feras, Os Trapalhões, Zorra Total, A Grande Família, Chapa Quente, Os Caras de Pau, Pé na Cova, A Mulher Invisível, Mister Brau, Tapas & Beijos and Sai de Baixo, on air from May 2010 until at least September 2013. To commemorate the channel's third anniversary, four new episodes of Sai de Baixo were produced and broadcast in August 2013, with part of the original cast. The channel has also shown Escolinha do Professor Raimundo since it was launched, and even broadcast a remake of it in 2015, with the episodes also shown by TV Globo, which was a co-producer, in celebration of the show's 25th anniversary. Due to the positive response, it was given new seasons until 2020. The company also produced an original series: Meu Amigo Encosto, in 2014.

Music has been present on Viva since its inception. The first music program to be re-run on the channel was Som Brasil, as well as Estação Globo and Globo de Ouro, the latter of which was given two modern-day revivals, the first in 2014, with the addition of the title Palco Viva, and aired until 2016. The second aired in 2023, to commemorate the program's 50th anniversary, but re-airing some performances. Shows from Fantástico were also shown on the channel, such as Retrato Falado, As 50 Leis do Amor and Sexo Oposto.

For young audiences, the channel aired some classic TV Globo programs and series, such as Sítio do Pica Pau Amarelo (the 1977 and 2001 versions), Sandy e Júnior, Caça Talentos, Flora Encantada, Planeta Xuxa, Clara e o Chuveiro do Tempo, Terra dos Meninos Pelados, O Relógio da Aventura, TV Colosso, among others, as well as several seasons of Malhação. Reality shows have also been shown on Viva, including reruns of the first season of No Limite and the first seasons of Big Brother Brasil.

The channel has also produced its own programs to pay tribute to the great names of Brazilian television, including Reviva, Damas TV, Rebobina, Grandes Atores, As Vililas Que Amamos, As Crianças Que Amamos, É Tudo Novela! Reviva, Damas da TV, Viva o Sucesso, Rebobina, Grandes Atores, As Vilãs Que Amamos, As Crianças Que Amamos, É Tudo Novela!, Os Casais Que Amamos, Donos da História, Orgulho Além da Tela, Os Comediantes que Amamos, among others.

During Carnival 2014, Viva broadcast the parades of Grupo de Acesso and the Rio de Janeiro Carnival Champions, its first live broadcast. The channel also broadcast the 26th Brazilian Music Awards in 2015.

On 18 May 2014, in celebration of its fourth anniversary, Viva launched a high definition feed, with the SD feed initially being available on some operators in simulcast. Along with the HD signal, the channel updated its on-air look.

In 2022, the channel aired Caminho das Índias, the first telenovela to be broadcast in high definition on the channel, since 2014 all productions prior to 2007 (usually filmed in 4:3 SDTV) have been broadcast by the channel in 16:9 stretched to fit most modern television models. It also began airing Mexican telenovelas through a partnership signed with TelevisaUnivision in 2021. Among the titles acquired were: Marimar, La usurpadora, María la del Barrio, Amar a muerte and Caer en tentación.

In 2023, the channel began re-running Xou da Xuxa, which was one of the channel's most requested programs, and has been airing talk shows again since their departure in 2019 with the channel's revamp, when it began focusing exclusively on films, series/miniseries, sitcoms, telenovelas, reruns of TV Globo specials and some of its own programs.

=== As Globoplay Novelas (2025–present) ===
Globoplay Novelas's first logo, used between 9 and 22 june 2025.

On 7 May 2025, in a way of celebrating the 15th anniversary of the launch of Viva, Globo announced that the network would be rebranded to Globoplay Novelas. The change was adopted after observing a growth in interest in telenovelas, especially on Globoplay, which is Viva's flagship format as well as having its largest audience.

As a result, the channel would stop airing comedy series and reruns of programs, and would become exclusive to telenovelas. It would also open four more timeslots for dramas, with Além do Tempo, El amor invencible, Hercai and Guerreiros do Sol being selected, as well as an interactive slot dubbed "thematic battles" premiering in July 2025, that allows viewers to pick the telenovela that would air, with Por Amor and Laços de Família vying for a place in the first poll. These telenovelas joined other titles that had been airing such as Roque Santeiro, Quatro por Quatro, Plumas & Paetês, Caras & Bocas, Malhação 2014 and Celebridade. The relaunch took place on June 9, 2025. The last program to air on Viva was episode 7 of the first season of the sitcom Toma Lá, Dá Cá. Globoplay Novelas officially launched at 8:00 p.m. BRT, with the broadcast of the first episode of the telenovela Além do Tempo.
