= Thumbor =

Open-source image processing web service

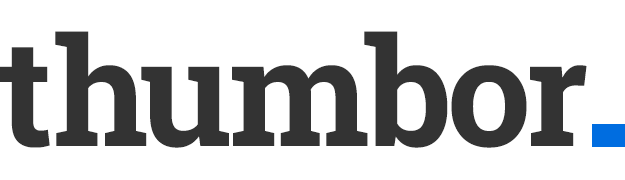
- Developer: Globo.com
- Initial release: June 6, 2013
- Stable release: 7.8.0 / May 30, 2026
- Written in: Python
- Operating system: Cross-platform
- Platform: Cross-platform
- Type: Image processing
- License: MIT License
- Website: thumbor.org
- Repository: github.com/thumbor

Thumbor is an open-source image processing service for real-time image resizing and manipulation. Originally developed by Globo.com, the tool is written in Python and supports smart image cropping using facial recognition and other object detection algorithms. Thumbor is free software licensed under the MIT License and distributed through GitHub. It is notably used by large-scale organizations, including the Wikimedia Foundation, Amazon Web Services, and Square for their image processing infrastructure, and is recognized as a popular self-managed image content delivery network (CDN).

== Features ==
Thumbor enables dynamic resizing, allowing images to be generated in various sizes upon request. It can also leverage facial recognition and interest point detection algorithms to automatically crop images in a visually relevant way. Additionally, Thumbor provides filter support, enabling the application of effects such as brightness, contrast, and blur.

Thumbor also integrates with multiple backend systems, including Amazon S3, Google Cloud Storage, and Redis for storage and caching. Security features include encrypted URL signatures to prevent unauthorized manipulation.

== Usage ==
Thumbor is used by companies requiring large-scale, real-time image manipulation—especially in news portals., e-commerce platforms, and web applications that demand high-performance media delivery.

=== Notable examples ===
The Wikimedia Foundation, which operates Wikipedia and other projects, uses Thumbor as part of its image processing infrastructure. Since June 2017, all thumbnail traffic for public and beta wikis has been served through Thumbor. In February 2018, support was extended to private wikis, and in April of the same year, the previous MediaWiki-based thumbnailing system was decommissioned. As of April 2023, Thumbor began serving production traffic via Kubernetes.

Amazon uses Thumbor as part of its image processing infrastructure. The Serverless Image Handler solution, integrated with Amazon CloudFront, enables real-time image resizing, conversion, and filter application using Thumbor alongside AWS Lambda. Amazon’s official documentation lists supported filters such as blur, grayscale, equalize, sharpen, and smart crop, which can be applied via URL.

== Operation ==
=== Server-based architecture ===
Thumbor operates as a web service, processing images on demand. It receives HTTP requests with parameters such as image size, quality, cropping, and other adjustments. The server then manipulates the image according to the received parameters and returns the modified image to the client.

=== URL as interface ===
The primary interface for interacting with Thumbor is through URLs. These URLs can include various parameters for image manipulation, such as resizing (width, height), filters (e.g., blur, rotate), cropping, and more. Thumbor processes the image based on the parameters passed in the URL.

Example URL: https://thumbor.example.com/unsafe/300x200/smart/https://example.com/image.jpg

In this example:

- 300x200 defines the final dimensions of the image.
- smart applies a smart cropping algorithm that attempts to focus on the most relevant content of the image.
- https://example.com/image.jpg is the original image URL (source), which will be fetched and processed by Thumbor.

The segment unsafe in the URL indicates that the image will be processed without requiring a security signature. This behavior can be configured depending on deployment settings.

== See also ==
- Digital image processing
- Content delivery network
- Facial recognition system
