= Multishow =

Television station in Brazil

- Country: Brazil
- Headquarters: Rio de Janeiro

Programming
- Language: Portuguese
- Picture format: 1080i (16:9 HDTV) (HD feed downgraded to letterboxed 480i for SDTV sets)

Ownership
- Owner: Canais Globo (Grupo Globo)
- Sister channels: Rede Globo; SporTV; GNT; Globo News; Mais na Tela; Bis; Globoplay Novelas

History
- Launched: 10 November 1991; 33 years ago

Links
- Webcast: globoplay.globo.com (subscription required)
- Website: gshow.globo.com/multishow/

Multishow is an entertainment channel owned by Canais Globo, Grupo Globo's cable and satellite television channel operator. It was launched in 1991, as one of the company's first four channels (with Telecine, Top Sport – now SporTV – and GNT). A high-definition simulcast was launched on 15 December 2012, at 11:59 pm Brazilian Summer Time (UTC-02), with a live telecast of a Rolling Stones concert at the Prudential Center.

== History ==
Multishow launched in 1991 with an 18-hour schedule. Niche programming from ZDF, NHK and Antenne 2 was carried to cater to their respective ethnic minorities, subtitled. The channel also aired cult series such as The Simpsons and The Addams Family. In its earliest phase, the channel was aiming towards an increase in original productions and imported specials. The channel aired the successful Venezuelan telenovela Cristal in at 7pm timeslot, without competing against TV Globo's telenovelas. The producers of Telecurso were also creating a program for the channel aimed at topics of interest for the subscribed elite, such as how to ride a jet ski. Around May 1992, Multishow had an investment of US$40 million for a subscriber base of 16,000.

== Programming ==
=== Original programming ===
- Batom e Parafina
- Bastidores
- Bicicleta e Melancia
- BBB: A Eliminação
- Casa Bonita (on hiatus)
- Conexões Urbanas
- Cilada
- De Cara Limpa
- Desenrola Aí
- Experimente
- Extremos
- Geleia do Rock
- Intercâmbio
- Kaiak
- Lu Alone
- Lugar Incomum
- Minha Praia
- Morando Sozinho
- Na Fama e Na Lama
- Nalu pelo Mundo
- Não Conta Lá em Casa
- No Caminho
- Nós 3
- Operação S2
- Osso Duro
- Outros Lugares
- Papo Calcinha
- Pé no Chão
- As Pegadoras
- Por Trás da Fama
- Reclame
- Qual é a Boa?
- Quase Anônimos
- Que Rock é Esse?
- Rock Estrada
- Se Joga!
- Sensacionalista
- Será que Faz Sentido?
- TVZ
  - Top TVZ
  - TVZ Experimente
  - TVneja
  - Clássicos Multishow
- Urbano
- Vai pra Onde?
- Viagem Sem Fim

=== Non-original programming ===
- Altas Horas (repeat of the previous night's episode on Globo)
- Big Brother Brasil (extended coverage)
- El Chapulín Colorado
- El Chavo del Ocho
- Fight Girls
- Dead Set
- Degrassi: The Next Generation
- Everybody Hates Chris
- Misfits
- My Big Fat Obnoxious Fiancé
- Sexytime
- Sexcetera
- Co-Ed Confidential
- The Best Sex Ever
- Sex and the City
- Cybernet
- Beauty and the Geek
- Sex...with Mom and Dad
- The Bad Girls Club
- Being Human

=== Specials ===
- Multishow Ao Vivo
- Multishow Brazilian Music Award
- Multishow Registro

== Bis ==
On 1 October 2009, Multishow launched its HDTV channel, Multishow HD. Like other HD channels owned by Globosat at the time (such as Globosat HD, Telecine HD and Premiere FC/Combate HD), instead of being a simulcast of the main channel, it featured a separate, mostly music-oriented lineup, with concerts, documentaries and other music-related programming, but most concerts also air in SD on the main channel. Until the launch of Multishow HD, all of Multishow's HD content aired on Globosat HD, which still broadcasts Multishow's non-music high-definition programming, and some music programs.

On 27 August 2012, in anticipation to the launch of a high-definition simulcast of Multishow, Multishow HD was renamed provisionally Bis Multishow HD ("bis" is the Brazilian term for "encore") and later, in November 2012, renamed as simply Bis. The music-oriented programming of the channel remained mostly unchanged.

== Trivia ==
- All foreign-language songs featured on foreign programming and on music videos are subtitled in Portuguese.
