= TV Globo Internacional =

- Country: Brazil
- Broadcast area: Brazil; International
- Network: TV Globo
- Headquarters: Rio de Janeiro

Programming
- Language: Portuguese
- Picture format: 1080i HDTV (downscaled to 16:9 480i/576i for the SDTV feed)

Ownership
- Owner: Roberto Irineu Marinho
- Parent: Grupo Globo
- Key people: Roberto Irineu Marinho (president)
- Sister channels: TV Globo Portugal

History
- Launched: 24 August 1999; 27 years ago
- Founder: Roberto Marinho

Links
- Webcast: globoplay.globo.com (subscription required, available outside of Brazil)
- Website: globointernacional.globo.com

Availability

Streaming media
- Sling TV (United States): Internet Protocol television
- DirecTV Stream (United States): Internet Protocol television

TV Globo Internacional (also known by its acronym TVGI or just as Globo) is an international pay television channel broadcasting from Brazil. It was launched on 24 August 1999 and it is owned by Grupo Globo.

== History ==
Former logo of TV Globo Internacional, used from 1999 to 2008

Globo announced the launch of the channel in May 1999, with a prospective launch date for June. They had already assisted in a prior experiment in Japan (IPCTV). The service was going to provide an eight-hour block running three times to make a 24-hour cycle, and that 70% of the schedule would be identical to its parent network in Brazil. The remaining 30% was to consist of programming from its archives. Foreign content would not be seen due to licensing issues. The service was to be premium from the outset, with an estimate potential audience of 5.5 million subscribers, of which 2.2 million were Brazilian immigrants and 3.3 million were Portuguese immigrants. The service wasn't set to launch in Portugal due to its shares held at SIC, as well as the Portuguese GNT cable channel. Operational costs were estimated to be worth R$3.5 million, while the profit from subscribers would be estimated at RS$2 million in its first twelve months alone.

The channel started broadcasting on 24 August. The primary targets were the United States and Japan. Globo wanted to launch the channel in selected Latin American countries (Chile, Argentina, Colombia and Mexico) within its first two weeks and Europe within its first month. Globo also planned to include Spanish-language programming within a two-year window.

By June 2000, the channel had claimed 1 million subscribers, still far from the long-term goal of achieving the 5.5 target. The channel launched in Africa that month, in Angola and Mozambique, while later eyeing for a launch in South Africa. The aim was to target Portuguese-speaking countries.

Starting from the 2000 edition, the Criança Esperança charity started collecting donations from viewers outside of Brazil, specifically from TV Globo Internacional subscribers.

No Limite, Globo's first reality show, was blocked from TV Globo Internacional due to rights issues and allegations that the network was copying Survivor (which Globo denied), and was trying to resolve the issue. The network did not disclose who was responsible for the negotiations.

The channel reached Australia on 6 December 2000 through an agreement with TARBS. It also negotiated with British, Dutch and French operators, with the aim to formally launch the channel in Europe by the first trimester of 2001.

Three years after launch, the channel already surpassed 200,000 subscribers, divided in three key areas – Americas, Africa and Australia (also including New Zealand and East Timor). Programs were subject to constant repeats due to timezone issues. By early 2003, the number of subscribers in the three African countries where it was carried (Angola, Mozambique and South Africa) had surpassed the US figure: 50,000 in Africa against 43,000 in the United States alone.

The channel launched in Canada in 2003 after receiving a permit from the CRTC. In the United States, its carriage expanded to cable operators, as up until then, it was limited to satellite operators, under the grounds that the cable operators had more foothold in the market share.

In 2004, the channel signed a contract with Comcast, aiming to reach out to subscribers in Boston and Miami, cities with a strong Brazilian diaspora. The channel also launched in Mexico, after signing an agreement with Televisa, to carry the channel on its two subscription television operators, Sky and Cablevisión, to 150,000 households. Official data at the time said that the channel was available to 1.8 million households, for a total of seven million viewers.

In 2006, TV Globo Internacional's largest market was Angola, reaching close to 100,000 subscribers in the country alone, surpassing over 90,000 subscribers in the United States. The channel also built studios for local production in Angola, catering its African audience. Facing the closure of GNT in Portugal, as TV Globo Internacional was distributed to the rest of Europe by means of Hispasat, where TV Cabo's satellite package was located, TV Globo Internacional announced the launch of its own direct-to-home platform for Europe, starting March 15, 2006. The payment central was located in the United Kingdom, the operational base in Paris and the logistic center in Italy. The channel carried the 2006 FIFA World Cup in the United States thanks to a last-minute agreement days before the start of the competition. 56 out of the 64 matches were carried live. In the third round of the group phase, the eight remaining matches aired in 20-minute highlights.

Broadcasts to Portugal resumed on 1 October 2007 with a separate service than the one to the rest of Europe in order to avoid conflicts with SIC, which had a contract to air some of its titles. In January 2009, the channel was added to iO in the New York metropolitan area.

Current version of TV Globo Internacional logo, in use since 2008

On 11 November 2012, a Portuguese version of Globo was launched.

On 31 December 2021, Globo Internacional closed in Europe in favor of the expansion of Globoplay in the region, the linear channel continues only on Globoplay and in Portugal.

== Programming ==
TV Globo Internacional offers more than four thousand hours of programming a day, including soap operas, series, miniseries, music, comedy, documentaries, news and live soccer. The channel's signal comes from Globo's playouts in Rio de Janeiro and São Paulo, and transmitted via satellite to the different international distributors. Access to the channel takes place through local cable or satellite operators. They are currently available in more than 105 countries on four continents: Africa, Americas, Asia and Oceania.

Globo Internacional's programming is similar to that of TV Globo in Brazil, but because it is an international channel, not all programming coming from Brazil could be aired (due to international broadcasting rights). Switches are also made in the grid of programs for their subscribers in 115 countries in order to offer more variety. TVGI, in addition to the soap operas and miniseries produced by TV Globo in Brazil, also broadcasts TV news programs such as Hora Um da Notícia, Bom Dia Brasil, Jornal Hoje, Jornal Nacional and Jornal da Globo, live soccer, besides the three telenovelas currently airing in Brazil. The episodes will air the day after the original broadcast in Brazil, due to differences in time zone and editing. The same thing happens in relation to the series. In the case of Vale a Pena Ver de Novo, the telenovela transmitted to a certain region will not necessarily be the same one as aired in Brazil. Serials such as A Diarista, Casseta & Planeta Urgente, Caldeirão do Huck, A Grande Família, Domingão do Faustão and Zorra Total, among others, are also broadcast by TVGI. Subscribers could follow the matches of the Brazilian Championship, Brazil Cup and some state championships. The TV Globo Internacional also broadcasts the Brazilian Carnival, national films, Spectacular Sports and shows.

It also broadcasts its own productions such as Planeta Brasil EUA, Planeta Brasil Japão, Cá Estamos, Conexões and America News, which brings the best of Brazilian communities abroad. In addition it also transmits GNT shows.

== Correspondents ==
=== Journalism ===
No.	City	Country	Journalist
1	New York	United States	Jorge Pontual; Sandra Coutinho; Felipe Santana; Carolina Cimenti; Guga Chacra; Candice Carvalho; Felippe Coaglio and Nilson Klava
2	Washington, D.C.	United States	Raquel Krähenbühl
3	Buenos Aires	Argentina	Ariel Palacios
4	London	United Kingdom	Cecília Malan; Murilo Salviano; Natalie Reinoso and Rodrigo Carvalho
5	Paris	França	Paola de Orte
6	Lisbon	Portugal	Leonardo Monteiro
7	Rome	Italy	Ilze Scamparini
8	Zurich	Switzerland	Bianca Rothier
9	Santiago	Chile	Camilla Viegas
10	Johannesburg	South Africa	Vinicius Assis

=== Sports ===
No.	City	Country	Sportcaster
1	New York City	United States	André Galllindo
2	Paris	France	Guilherme Pereira
3	Madrid	Spain	Fernando Kallás
4	Buenos Aires	Argentina	Raphael Sibilla

== Carriage ==
=== Americas ===
In the Americas, in addition to the premium Globo Internacional channel, which is broadcast almost simultaneously with Brazilian programming and with original audio, the station has Pasiones from Hemisphere Media Group as the main partner in Latin America and the United States. Programming from the latter channel consists of soap operas from Globo dubbed in Spanish.

=== Europe ===
On 22 November 2021, it was announced that TV Globo Internacional would stop broadcasting in all European countries, except Portugal, from 31 December. Viewers will follow Globo Internacional's programming through Globoplay, whose international service is available in select Western European countries. At the time the decision was taken, misinformation emerged on TikTok due to a supposed crisis, which was denied by Globo.

=== Africa ===
TV Globo Internacional launched in August 2000 on the DStv platform catering audiences in South Africa, Angola and Mozambique.

== See also ==
- Grupo Globo
- Globosat
