= Gloob =

Brazilian pay TV kids channel, owned by Grupo Globo

- Country: Brazil
- Headquarters: Rio de Janeiro

Programming
- Languages: Brazilian Portuguese; English (selected programs)
- Picture format: HDTV 1080i; SDTV 480i (downscaled)

Ownership
- Owner: Canais Globo
- Parent: Grupo Globo
- Key people: List: Tatiana Costa (General Director, Grupo Globo Kids Unit); Luiz Filipe Figueira (Head of Programming and Content Strategy, Grupo Globo Kids Unit)
- Sister channels: Gloobinho; GNT; Multishow; Modo Viagem

History
- Launched: 15 June 2012; 14 years ago 11:00 am (BRT)

Links
- Webcast: globoplay.globo.com (Available only in Brazil, subscription required)

Gloob (Portuguese pronunciation: "Glubi"), also known as Mundo Gloob, is a Brazilian pay television children's channel that was launched on 15 June 2012, aimed at children 6 to 12 years old. Owned, operated and part of Canais Globo, a television broadcast network, and subsidiary of Grupo Globo. Its name is an anagram of the word globo (as in O Globo), reversing the letter "O" before the "B".

It airs action, adventure, humor (especially slapstick) and music-based shows, but regional, live-action content is the currently focused. Under local live action, the channel is also always searching for mystery-detective shows in the vein of Gloob's long-running live-action series, Detetives do Prédio Azul (Blue Building Detectives), as well as shows like the kidsnet's first original sitcom Bugados (internationally titled Game Crashers). Gloob's pipeline, though, is essentially covered until 2024, which means the team is on the hunt for series that will complement a 2024-2025 timeline. A sister channel, Gloobinho, targets preschoolers.

== History ==
=== Background ===
In late 1995, it was announced that Globosat would be making deals with the News Corporation to develop domestic versions of U.S. channels to the country. Among them were ESPN International, Fox News Channel and Fox Kids. The premiere date of the children's channel was scheduled for June 1996, but only USA Network, the company's movie channel, was launched with Fox Kids being launched in November by Fox itself.

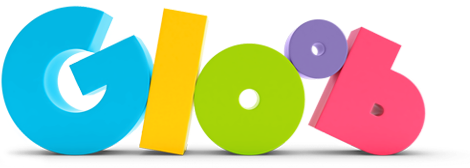
First logo used from 2012 to 2017

In 2012, Globosat (Canais Globo), released the channel's logo, with the color chart, textures and geometric shapes representing fun, stimulating and curious, bringing geometric and solid shapes as logical blocks of wood. In an interview, the manager of Art Creation at Globosat, Manuel Falcão, stated that "The letters of the name are in apparent imbalance and with disproportionate sizes between them, when animated, the irreverence of the Brazilian child", he said. Within the channel's launch, the campaign won the gold award in the Best Logo category by PromaxBDA Latin America in 2012.

Second logo used from 2017 to 2022

In June 2012, due to an audience considered low for children's programs on broadcast TV, Globo announced it would stop broadcasting its children's strand, TV Globinho, during the week to focus on a female audience with a new block, Encontro. To retain this audience, Globo launched a full-time pay TV channel, which would be more lucrative than its predecessor.

=== Post-launch ===
The channel was supposed to be launched on 1 June 2012, but this was postponed two weeks to 15 June. It appeared at launch on NET, Claro TV, Vivo TV, CTBC TV, Oi TV, GVT TV and Sky. On Sky, it was initially offered only in HD until December 2012.

On 17 October 2017, a separate channel for the preschool audience 'Gloobinho' was launched.

In 2015, the channel, and Zag signed an agreement where it began co-producing Miraculous: Tales of Ladybug & Cat Noir which was started at Season 3, in addition to having exclusivity of exhibition in Brazil and the addition of a Brazilian character.

== Programming ==
The channel features foreign animations and series, as well as co-productions and partnerships with Brazilian producers, and in the future it will broadcast game-shows, reality-shows, in addition to live-actions. According to Paulo Marinho, general director, the channel would not broadcast Japanese anime. At first, Globosat planned to buy TV Cultura programs, such as the renowned Castelo Rá-Tim-Bum, among others, but the negotiations did not go ahead.

The channel also features reruns of classic animations such as The Smurfs, Popeye, Dungeons & Dragons, He-Man and the Masters of the Universe, and She-Ra: Princess of Power. Currently, it focuses more on their own series and cartoons, such as: Bugados, D.P.A.: Detetives do Prédio Azul, Escola de Génios, Gaby Estrella, Osmar, a Primeira Fatia do Pão de Forma, SOS Fada Manu and Tronquinho e Pão de Queijo.

The channel also continues to focus on new cartoon acquisitions of more well-known characters such as Miraculous: Tales of Ladybug & Cat Noir, LoliRock, Angry Birds, Thunderbirds, Pac-Man and the Ghostly Adventures, Zorro and Chica Vampiro.

The channel has also presented the 2001 version of Sítio do Picapau Amarelo, along with Futura, also operated by Globosat.

The channel also aired Turma da Mônica: A Série.

The Pokémon anime has been broadcast on Gloob.

== Audience ==
In December 2012, the channel reached the 48th position among the most watched pay television channels in Brazil. In 2013, the channel jumped to 35th place in the national ranking of these channels and achieved 70% in the audience among children's channels in primetime. During the free election time period on open TV, Gloob grew 183% in audience between 1:00 pm and 1:50 pm (BRT) in August 2014.

One of these reflexes was the first place (among children's channels) conquered by the series Detetives do Prédio Azul (Blue Building Detectives), shown on 31 October. In the monthly total for November 2014, the channel was among the ten most watched channels on pay TV and in third place among the channels most watched by children.

In 2019, the premiere of the first Brazilian children's sitcom, Bugados, left the channel in 1st place on pay TV in the showtime in 6 episodes, and took it to the second place among channels for children.

== See also ==
- Gloobinho, formerly TV Globinho
