= TV Globo DF =

TV Globo DF (ZYA 508)
- Brasília, Federal District; Brazil
- Channels: Digital: 21 (UHF); Virtual: 10
- Branding: Globo DF

Programming
- Affiliations: TV Globo

Ownership
- Owner: Grupo Globo; (Globo Comunicação e Participações S/A)
- Sister stations: CBN Brasília

History
- First air date: April 21, 1971
- Former names: TV Globo Brasília (1971–1976; 2021–2025); Rede Globo Brasília (1976–2021)
- Former channel numbers: Analog: 10 (VHF, 1971–2016)

Technical information
- Licensing authority: ANATEL
- ERP: 1,5 kW
- Transmitter coordinates: 15°47′8.88″S 47°53′19.14″W

Links
- Public license information: Profile
- Website: redeglobo.globo.com/globobrasilia

TV Globo DF (channel 10; previously known as TV Globo Brasília) is a television station licensed to Brasília, Federal District, Brazil serving as the TV Globo station for the capital and its surrounding areas, owned-and-operated by Globo, a subsidiary of Grupo Globo. Due to difficult reception in some areas, the station also operates on channel 20 UHF in Gama and Brazlândia. Its studios are in the North Radio and Television Sector (SRTVN), in the North Wing of Plano Piloto, and its transmitters are in the Brasília Digital TV Tower, in the administrative region of Lago Norte.

== History ==
While still preparing the installation of TV Globo in Rio de Janeiro, Organizações Globo received, on April 27, 1962, the concession to establish a television channel in Brasília, through a decree signed by Prime Minister Tancredo Neves. After Rede Globo was inaugurated in 1965, its signal reached the federal capital through TV Nacional, belonging to the Federal Government, between 1967 and 1969.

After two years of preparations, TV Globo Brasília was inaugurated at 1:10 pm on April 21, 1971, the date on which Brasília celebrated its 11th anniversary. At the ceremony, in addition to Roberto Marinho, owner of the station, guests such as the governor of the Federal District, Hélio Prates da Silveira, the minister of Industry and Commerce, Pratini de Moraes, and the archbishop of Brasília, Dom José Newton de Almeida Baptista, who named the installations, were present. In its inaugural program, a football match between Vasco da Gama and Flamengo was aired, and the program Som Livre Exportação, carried out live at Concha Acústica in the Federal District and broadcast throughout the country.

Since its founding, the station has been strategically fundamental for its inclusion in national news, for political topics. In 1983, Bom Dia Brasil started to be produced from Brasília, as at the time its format was predominantly about politics and economics.

In 1994, the station suffered a fire in its facilities, but this did not stop the production of programming. Until 1995, the broadcaster's programming also covered the municipalities surrounding the Federal District, but after the creation of TV Rio Vermelho de Luziânia, the programming was restricted only to the Federal District. In 1996, with the production of Bom Dia Brasil starting to be carried out in Rio de Janeiro, TV Globo Brasília began to only participate with articles for the network and with comments on the news.

The station was added to Via Embratel in May 2011.

Logo of TV Globo Brasília from 2021 to 2025.

On September 7, 2013, in one of the waves of protests taking place in the country, a group of protesters tried to invade the broadcaster's headquarters in Asa Norte. Vandals stoned cars that were in the parking lot and tried to break down the access door to the building, but were restrained by security guards and dispersed by the Military Police Riot Squad.

On 29 May 2025, it was announced at social media that TV Globo Brasília has officially renamed as TV Globo DF, retiring the use of "Brasília" moniker after 54 years.

== Technical information ==
Virtual	Digital channel	Aspect ratio	Content
10.1	21 UHF	1080i	TV Globo Brasília/Globo programming

The station officially started its digital transmissions on April 22, 2009, during DFTV's 2nd edition. On December 2, 2013, the station's news programs began to be produced in high definition, alongside the network's news programming.

Based on the federal decree for the transition of Brazilian TV stations from analogue to digital signals, TV Globo Brasília, as well as other stations in the city of Brasília and the surrounding Federal District, ceased broadcasting on VHF channel 10 on 17 November 2016, following the official ANATEL timeline. The station's signal was interrupted at 11:59 pm during the broadcast of Adnight, being replaced by a notice from MCTIC and ANATEL about the switch-off.

On 14 April 2026, TV Globo DF started broadcasting on the TV 3.0 test transmitter in Brasília, alongside other stations available locally.

== Programming ==
The broadcaster participates live on national television with articles and comments about politics on television news, and also produces local programs.

- Bom Dia DF: News, with Fred Ferreira and Natália Godoy;
- DF1: News, with Fabiano Andrade;
- Globo Esporte DF: Sports news, with José Maurício Oliveira;
- DF2: News, with Antônio de Castro;
- Globo Comunidade: Journalistic, presented on a rotating basis

=== History of local programming ===
At the time of its creation, TV Globo Brasília's journalism had in its programming, like other Globo stations, local versions or blocks of the network's news programs. Hoje was presented by Maria Luísa and Antônio Lúcio, and was produced entirely locally until 1974, when it became a block of the Rio version, now shown on the national network. The local section of Jornal Nacional was presented by Heitor Ribeiro, and later by Júlio César.

Other programs would also appear throughout the 1970s, such as Globinho, a short television news program aimed at children, presented by Tania Mara, shown from 1974 onwards. In the same year, the bulletin Plantão Globo also debuted, with reports shown in daily segments, until 1976. That year, Jornalismo Eletrônico began to air, presented by Luís Lopes Correia, which lasted until 1978. And in 1977, it began to air the interview program Panel, presented by Claudio Lessa, will be shown, together with the national version made from Rio de Janeiro.

In 1979, Jornal das Sete debuted, presented by Carlos Campbell, which lasted until January 1, 1983. This year, with the total reformulation of the regional journalism of Rede Globo stations and affiliates and the adoption of the Praça TV journalistic standard, DFTV debuted on January 3, initially only with the night edition presented by Carlos Magno. In June of the same year, the afternoon edition of the newspaper debuted, presented by André Duda. Between March 1983 and March 1989, there was also a third edition of the newscast, shown after Jornal da Globo, with a presentation by Sérgio Machado, and later, by Ana Paula Padrão. Between March 25, 1984, and June 21, 1987, the news program was also shown on Sundays after Fantástico. In 1989, like the third edition, the first edition of the news program was discontinued, returning only in 1992.

On January 7, 1991, TV Globo Brasília debuted Bom Dia DF, presented by Carlos Campbell, being the last of the network's own stations to debut its version of the morning news program. Following the same pattern as Bom Dia Brasil, the program also featured interviews and debates about politics, carried out by Alexandre Garcia. Other names such as Paulo José Cunha, André Duda, Fabiana Fernandez, Carlos Magno and Cláudia Bomtempo also presented the news program in the 1990s. In the same year, Globo Comunidade also debuted, presented on Saturday mornings, and later on Sundays from 1996.

Between 2000 and April 6, 2002, the station aired the program Articultura, presented by Aline Maccari, which highlighted Brasília's cultural scene, with reports and special interviews with local artists. The program was produced in partnership with the production company Fabrika Filmes, and was shown on Saturdays, at noon.

At the end of the 90s and beginning of the 2000s, the journalistic standards Bom Dia Praça and Praça TV underwent new reformulations to adopt a more popular editorial line linked to the community. It is in the meantime that Bom Dia DF and DFTV are undergoing changes to the sets and command of the attractions. Fernanda de Brittany started to command the morning news program in 2001, while Alexandre Garcia and Márcia Zarur started to command DFTV 1st edition in the same year. Luiz Carlos Braga, who had already been in charge of DFTV 2nd edition since 1996, remained in charge of the news program until 2008, when he was fired by the broadcaster and migrated to TV Record Brasília.

In 2004, Liliane Cardoso took over Bom Dia DF, while Fernanda de Brittany started to present DFTV 1st edition with Alexandre Garcia replacing Márcia Zarur. In 2007, like other Rede Globo stations, the Radar DF news bulletin debuted, which provides information about traffic and weather, as well as short headlines. In 2008, Fernanda de Brittany was replaced by Camila Guimarães on DFTV 1st edition, and DFTV 2nd edition started to be presented by Antônio de Castro. In March 2009, the broadcaster's journalism expanded community participation with the creation of Redação Móvel, where the public participates live from a neighborhood in the Federal District.

In 2010, Liliane Cardoso started to present DFTV 1st edition in place of Camila Guimarães, who took Liliane's place on Bom Dia DF. However, in the same year, Fred Ferreira and Viviane Costa took charge of the morning news program. In 2011, Flávia Alvarenga replaced Fred Ferreira and Viviane Costa at Bom Dia DF, while Alexandre Garcia and Liliane Cardoso were replaced by Fábio William in charge of DFTV 1st edition. In 2012, the broadcaster began offering "Globocop", giving more dynamism to news programs with live aerial coverage. In the same year, on August 21, Globo Esporte became entirely local, under the command of Gabriel Ramos and Viviane Costa. In 2013, Flávia Alvarenga left the Bom Dia DF bench, being replaced by Guilherme Portanova, while Viviane Costa started to present Globo Esporte alone.

On November 7, 2015, Distrito Cultural debuted on Saturdays, a seasonal program presented by Márcia Zarur, which shows events in music, literature and the arts in the Federal District, running until December 28, 2019. On May 13, 2019, Beatriz Pataro debuted as presenter of Bom Dia DF, alongside Guilherme Portanova. Portanova left Bom Dia DF and the broadcaster on November 12, after signing with RecordTV Brasília, being replaced by Fred Ferreira, who returns to television news after 8 years.

On January 20, 2020, Natália Godoy takes over Bom Dia DF in place of Beatriz Pataro, who went to report, thus forming a pair with Fred Ferreira. In May 2020, after 7 years in charge of Globo Esporte, Stephanie Alves left the broadcaster, being replaced by José Maurício Oliveira. Still in 2020, TV Globo Brasília extinguishes Radar DF and its bulletins during programming, with the format remaining only in the "Traffic in DF" section of Bom Dia DF.

On April 5, 2023, with the series of layoffs promoted by Globo in its branches, journalists Fábio William and Márcia Witczak were laid off in Brasília. With Fábio's departure, DFTV 1st edition started to be presented by Fabiano Andrade.
