= TV Globo =

Brazilian television network

- Corporate logo since 2024
- Type: Free-to-air; Commercial broadcasting Television network
- Country: Brazil
- Broadcast area: Nationwide
- Stations: TV Globo DF; TV Globo Minas; TV Globo Pernambuco; TV Globo Rio; TV Globo São Paulo
- Affiliates: see: List of TV Globo affiliates
- Headquarters: Rio de Janeiro, Brazil

Programming
- Language: Portuguese
- Picture format: 1080i HDTV

Ownership
- Owner: Grupo Globo
- Parent: Globo Comunicação e Participações S.A.
- Key people: Paulo Marinho (executive president)

History
- Launched: 26 April 1965; 61 years ago
- Founder: Roberto Marinho
- Former names: Rede Globo (1968–2021) (Note: The name began to be used since 1968 to name the network of stations that was being formed and was soon made official. "TV Globo" has always been used in a corporate way, but since 2021, with its officialization as a brand, "Rede Globo" became an informal name.)

Links
- Webcast: globoplay.globo.com (available only in Brazil)
- Website: redeglobo.globo.com

Availability

Terrestrial
- Digital terrestrial television: 18 UHF (São Paulo); 21 UHF (Brasília); 29 UHF (Rio de Janeiro); 33 UHF (Belo Horizonte); 36 UHF (Recife)

TV Globo (Brazilian Portuguese: [teˈve ˈɡlobu], lit. 'Globe TV'; stylized as tvglobo), formerly known as Rede Globo (Brazilian Portuguese: [ˈʁedʒi ˈɡlobu], lit. 'Globe Network') or simply known as Globo, is a Brazilian free-to-air television network, launched by media proprietor Roberto Marinho on 26 April 1965. It is owned by Globo, a division of media conglomerate Grupo Globo, in turn owned by Marinho's heirs. The network is by far the largest of its holdings. TV Globo is the largest commercial TV network in Latin America, the second largest commercial TV network in the world and the largest producer of telenovelas. This all makes Globo renowned as one of the most important television networks in the world and Grupo Globo as one of the largest media groups.

TV Globo is headquartered in the Jardim Botânico neighborhood of Rio de Janeiro, where its news division is based. The network's main production studios are located at a complex dubbed Estúdios Globo, located in Jacarepaguá, in the same city. TV Globo is composed of 5 owned-and-operated television stations and 122 affiliates throughout Brazil plus its own international networks, TV Globo Internacional and TV Globo Portugal. In 2007, TV Globo moved its analog operations to high-definition television production for digital broadcasting.

According to Brazilian national and international statistical data, TV Globo is one of the largest media companies in the world, and produces around 2,400 hours of entertainment and 3,000 hours of journalism per year in Brazil. Through its network, the broadcaster covers 98.6% of Brazil's territory. Recognized for its production quality, the company has already been presented with 14 international Emmys. The international operations of TV Globo include seven pay-per-view television channels and a production and distribution division that distributes Brazilian sports and entertainment content to more than 190 countries around the world.

In Brazil, TV Globo presently reaches 99.5% of potential viewers, practically the entire Brazilian population, with 5 owned-and-operated stations and 131 network affiliates that deliver programming to more than 183 million Brazilians. The network has been responsible for the 20 most-watched TV programs broadcast on Brazilian television, including Avenida Brasil, a 2012 record-breaking telenovela that reached 50 million viewers and was sold to 130 countries.

The successful programming structure of TV Globo has not changed since the 1970s: In primetime Monday through Saturday it airs four telenovelas and the newscast Jornal Nacional. The three telenovelas, along with other productions are made in the net's Projac, the largest production center in South America. The four top-rated TV shows in Brazil are Globo's flashy hourlong soap operas, called novelas, at 6 pm, 7 p.m. and 9:00 p.m. nightly, and Globo's national evening news at 8 p.m.—all from the network's own studios. Globo also produces 90% of its programming.

Globo (as it is known) has had a near monopoly on TV viewership and a symbiotic relationship with successive military and civilian governments. Its political and cultural sway in Brazil is unrivaled. "Globo has a very persuasive influence on diverse aspects of Brazilian society," comments Raul Reis, a former Brazilian journalist. Producing Brazilian-made programming in accordance with international technical standards, the television network grew to become the flagship of multimedia Globo Organization including cellular phone service, cable, television stations in Portugal and Mexico, book and magazine publishing, Internet and film production. The company is expanding its role in Brazilian and Latin American media, transforming from an old-style family fiefdom into a twenty-first-century media conglomerate. Most recently, Globo struck a strategic alliance with Microsoft, which paid $126 million in August for an 11.5 percent share in Globo Cabo, the company's cable subsidiary. Now an international economic powerhouse, TV Globo no longer needs the perks its proximity to local power once offered: it is on the road to becoming Latin America's prime player in the world's mass-media market.

== History ==
=== Early history ===
The roots of TV Globo can be traced to the beginning of the 20th century. What eventually became the Globo empire began in 1925 with the creation of the newspaper O Globo in Rio de Janeiro. In 1944, Rádio Globo went on the air and has become a school of radio broadcast news. It was the first radio network in Brazil to follow a 24-hour all news format. It had 26 wholly owned and affiliated stations.

In 1957, Brazilian President Juscelino Kubitschek approved a request by Rádio Globo to establish a television channel.

TV Globo began broadcasting on 26 April 1965 in Rio de Janeiro on channel 4. That same day, at about 10:45 a.m., Rubens Amaral formally introduced Rede Globo to viewers in Rio de Janeiro, and all over Guanabara State, with the song "Moon River" by Henry Mancini at the start of the children's show, Uni Duni Tê, an adaptation of Romper Room. It was the beginning of the Globo television network and vital component in the growth and expansion of the Globo organizations.

By May of that same year, the live telecast of the Holy Mass, which later became its longest running and oldest program, was seen for the first time. The following year, Globo purchased another television station, São Paulo-based TV Paulista and transforming it into the TV Globo São Paulo, expanding its operations and beginning to dominate national television ratings. In January 1966, Globo broadcast its first major news coverage on flooding in Rio de Janeiro.

Jornal da Globo, another trademark show for the network, was the successor to Tele Globo (1965–66), the network's first news program that ran until 1966. It featured a broadcast time of 30 minutes and was hosted by Hilton Gomez and, later, Luis Jatoba. In 1967, Globo began to build its national network with the affiliation of Porto Alegre-based TV Gaúcha (now RBS TV). It is one of Globo's oldest affiliates, active since 1962, three years before Globo was launched. Uberlândia's TV Triângulo (now Rede Integração) and Goiânia's TV Anhanguera (now Rede Anhanguera) soon followed in 1967 and 1968. The now extinct TV Guajará (now Boas Novas Belém), based in Belém, was launched in 1967, and was followed by TV Verdes Mares later in 1970. 1968 was also the year in which Globo's owned and operated station in Belo Horizonte, Minas Gerais, TV Globo Minas, was launched.

On 1 September 1969, the country and national television broadcasting changed with the premiere of Jornal Nacional (National News), the nation's first live newscast anchored by Cid Moreira and Hilton Gomes. Its theme music, "The Fuzz" by Frank DeVol, became one of the show's trademarks, together with the program logo and the "Boa Noite" ("Good night") closing established by the hosts.

TV Globo broadcast its first FIFA World Cup in 1970, the same year in which the Rede Excelsior network closed down, absorbed by Globo. The network's famous Plim-Plim interval sound also debuted that year.

Jornal Nacional's success was followed by the launch of Jornal Hoje (Today's News) on April 21st, 1971, the same day in which its Brasília station (TV Globo Brasília, Channel 10) was inaugurated. TV Globo Nordeste (Channel 13 in Recife, Pernambuco) would launch the next year.

Brazil had its first color television broadcast on February 19th, 1972, when Globo, along with many other TV stations in the country, broadcast the Festa da Uva (Grape Festival) in Caxias do Sul, Rio Grande do Sul, in the southern region of the country. Globo's coverage was narrated by Cid Moreira. Globo also broadcast the 1972 Summer Olympics in Munich that same year, being the first time the network broadcast the Olympics.

In 1973, "Globo Repórter" premiered, and it still airs today. That same year, the Sunday program "Fantástico" went on the air, which also remains on the air.

On June 4th, 1976, the station was hit by a fire that resulted in the loss of the archived footage of many early programs broadcast by the network. Despite the fire, the station only went off the air for a few minutes.

The last black-and-white programs transitioned to color broadcast in 1977. Color broadcasting arrived on the channel in 1976 or 1977.

=== 1980s to 1990s era ===
1986 was the key year when Xuxa Meneghel's own show, Xou da Xuxa (Xuxa's Show) debuted on Rede Globo. Xuxa, who left the similarly formatted program Clube da Criança on Rede Manchete, joined the network and thus, her show replaced the successful Balão Mágico as a result. It was a hit among children in all the country, airing all week (from Mondays to Saturdays) for seven years until 1992. That year was also the 20th anniversary of Os Trapalhões, which lasted until 1987. The network's other big program was its coverage of the 1986 Copa Ouro, plus the first telecast of the Criança Esperança children's charity show, which Renato Aragão (of Os Trapalhões) hosted. The logo was renovated several times in the years that followed. 1987 saw yet more improved programming debut in all areas. Jô Soares defected the network and moved to SBT.

TV Globo turned 30 on 26 April 1995. The highlights of the year included the opening of the brand new Projac (now Estúdios Globo) studios and the launch of a new youth oriented program: Malhação, plus its Festival 30 Anos (30 Years Festival) commemorative series. It was the year that Os Trapalhões ended a long successful run on the network, and the Plim Plim interval idents were updated by various cartoonists for the anniversary. Globo suffered a year of audience losses but in 1996 audience share began to increase until they were the nation's number one network, aided by brand new programs (among them were the telenovela O Rei do Gado and the very popular sitcom Sai de Baixo) and its coverage of the 1996 Summer Olympic Games in Atlanta, coupled with changes in the newsrooms. Globo was the first Brazilian network to have its own news channel, Globo News, which started in the same year. Now based in both São Paulo and Rio de Janeiro, the latter the main headquarters, it broadcast replays of Globo news programs, and had its own news programs and commentaries. The network ratings were threatened by the top rated programming from SBT and Record, but in 1998 the network recovered its top place with its 1998 FIFA World Cup live coverage, although violent images became an issue when its 9 P.M. telenovela Torre de Babel was pulled off the air. Holiday programming was boosted by its New Year's Eve premiere of Show da Virada, Aloysio Legey's creation and Brazil's response to international New Year television celebrations worldwide. That year was also the start of its ground breaking Brazil 500 project aimed at preparing the nation for its 500th anniversary of European discovery. The first clock was installed in Porto Seguro on 31 December 1997.

Globo has since expanded to become the largest TV Network in Brazil, with over $2 billion in revenue in 1992.

=== 21st century era ===
2001 started well for Globo, despite a fire at the Xuxa Park set in January that caused the show to be cancelled. The network had low audience ratings in several programs, two dramas were national hits, and the second version of Sítio do Picapau Amarelo children's program debuted. In the news departments the network covered the 9/11 attacks in the United States, and continued its coverage in the long aftermath.

On 1 October 2001, O Clone debuted and enjoyed both critical and popular success. It was written by Glória Perez and featured a large cast of stars. The telenovela was exported to 91 countries and has also become an international success.

For Globo, 2004 was the beginning of the long decline of viewership support for its legendary telenovelas, but the year was one of the strongest for television drama as telenovelas Da Cor do Pecado and Senhora do Destino made high ratings one after the other. The year saw its 2004 Athens Olympics Coverage as well and debuted Brazil TV in the afternoon bringing national news stories for satellite viewers.

2004–2005 was the year that changed the network's viewers as it marked its 40th anniversary years with mixed feelings, due to the improving situation of Rede Record, to which some Globo talent began decamping. The year ended in a high note for the network: Alma Gêmea and Belíssima.

The IBOPE ratings of São Paulo metropolitan area shows that Globo telenovelas has lost, between 2004 and 2008, 26.2% of viewership, although Globo is still the leader network. Its previous 9 p.m. telenovela, Viver a Vida, had an average rating of 37 points, an all-time low for Globo. But eventually overtaken by Passione (2010–11) and Insesato Coração (2011), who obtained an average of 35 points. These indices showed improvement in the ratings of the telenovelas Fina Estampa (2011–12) and Avenida Brasil (2012).

On 8 January 2019, Globo announced that Vídeo Show would be cancelled after 35 years due to declining ratings.

On 12 March 2020, Globo announced plans to suspend production of all of its existing telenovelas and the vast majority of its series in order to comply with global restrictions that were put in place for the COVID-19 pandemic, with Big Brother Brasil continuing to be filmed without an audience for the remainder of its twentieth season. On 26 October 2020, Globo announced GExperience, an interactive experience in which visitors will be able to go behind the scenes of a live TV show and see memorabilia from Globo's most famous novelas. Building work began in November 2020 and the experience is expected to open in April 2021 at the Market Place shopping centre in São Paulo.

On 25 January, Fausto Silva announced that he would retire from his variety show Domingão do Faustão at the end of the year. His timeslot was filled by a new version of Domingão hosted by Luciano Huck, while Marcos Mion took over Huck's previous show Caldeirão.

Due to the COVID-19 pandemic, in early March 2021 Globo decided to remove actors over the age of eighty from the recordings of soap operas. Less than two weeks later, actors over 69 were also removed. On 23 March, the broadcaster stopped recording soap operas and series until 19 April, due to the worsening of the COVID-19 pandemic.

On 1 April, Globo sold its record label Som Livre to Sony Music for an undisclosed amount. On the 15th, the network started to make available its soundtracks of soap operas and series, in addition to podcasts and songs used in the musical realities in the Deezer application, also creating an exclusive package in Globoplay for subscribers with a free year on the premium account.

On 28 April, Grupo Globo replaced the chairmanship of the Board of Directors, which had been occupied by Roberto Irineu Marinho since August 2003, when his father and founder of the conglomerate Roberto Marinho died. With the unanimous approval of the Board, his brother João Roberto Marinho assumed the presidency, and Roberto Irineu became vice-president of the group, along with the younger brother of the three, José Roberto Marinho.

On 27 May, the station acquired the broadcasting rights to all matches in the 2022 FIFA World Cup qualifiers. Until then, the channel held the rights only to matches played by the Brazil and Argentina national teams' home games. The acquisition of the games came to be seen as a counterattack, as the broadcaster lost the broadcasting rights of the UEFA Champions League, as well as losing the Copa Libertadores and the 2021 Copa América to SBT.

Globo's general audience in June was the worst for that month in the network's entire history. With 11.3 points, it was the third consecutive month with decreasing audiences.

On 28 September, it was announced the end of Malhação, after 27 seasons. The last season to air was "Toda Forma de Amar" (Every way of loving), which had an early finale due to measures to contain the COVID-19 pandemic. Since then, only reruns such as (Viva a Diferença/live the difference) and (Sonhos/Dreams) have been shown, leading to the cancellation of productions for the seasons "Transformação" (Transformation) and "Eu Quero é Ser Feliz" (I want to be happy). The station's planning is for a new schedule to replace the teen soap opera time.

On 25 October 2021, Globo and CONMEBOL reached an agreement and opted to terminate the arbitration in Switzerland, due to the termination of the contract in August 2020 for the broadcasting rights of the Copa Libertadores between 2019 and 2022. The network then won back the broadcasting rights of the Copa Libertadores from 2023 to 2026.

== Controversies ==
It has been popularly alleged that TV Globo's absolute dominance in Brazilian television has allowed its proprietors to influence public opinion in the country, such as during the 1989 presidential campaign, when it broadcast an edited version of the candidates' debate favoring Fernando Collor de Mello to Luiz Inácio Lula da Silva. Globo's history and influence was chronicled in the 1993 British documentary Beyond Citizen Kane, which compared it to that of the fictional character Charles Foster Kane.

On 15 March 1994, Jornal Nacional, Globo's nationwide primetime television newscast, was forced by the Superior Court of Justice to read a statement by then Rio de Janeiro's governor, Leonel Brizola. The group was found guilty of defaming Brizola in a newspaper article and on television. The court granted Brizola the right to address a response on Globo's Jornal Nacional, which had Cid Moreira to read Brizola's response.

In 2016, Globo generated worldwide controversy when The Guardian reported that the network had replaced the winner of its Globeleza carnival pageant because she was deemed to be too "black". The winner, Nayara Justino, had been selected after winning a vote on one of Brazil's most popular TV shows. Globo denied any wrongdoing.

== Logo and identity ==
The first TV Globo logo used from 26 April 1965 to 23 June 1966 and designed by Aloísio Magalhães.

The second TV Globo logo used from 29 September 1966 to 8 March 1976 and designed by Borjalo.

The monochrome version of the TV Globo logo used from 8 March 1976 to 30 March 2008, and designed by Hans Donner. It was also used on the network's microphone flags.

The monochrome TV Globo logo used since 30 March 2008 and also designed by Hans Donner. It's also used on the microphone flags of the network.

Alternative version of the monochrome TV Globo logo used since 2013.

Globo's original logo was a stylized star, with shapes evoking the number 4, in reference to the channel number of its original and flagship station. In 1966, it was replaced by a circle with a mesh design; in 1969, after becoming a full network, the mesh circle was accompanied by seven interlocking circles in a horizontal row, representing Globo's seven original affiliates. The current Globo logo, consisting of a globe, a cut-out representing a television screen, and a second globe within the "screen", has been used in various forms since 1976, and inspired by the CBS Eye logo. It was created by the German-born Austrian-Brazilian designer Hans Donner.

The original version, colored in blue and white, was replaced by a shaded metallic version in 1981. The following year, the same logo gained a three-dimensional version. In 1986, the logo adopted its longest-standing iteration, which rendered the two globes in silver, and fills the "screen" with a rainbow-colored gradient. The rainbow globe logo remained relatively unchanged through 2021, with changes limited to how the spheres and screen were rendered, such as in 2008 (when its shading became a less intricate "chrome", and the screen cut-out was made rectangular to reflect the 16:9 aspect ratio and digital television), and in April 2014, where the metallic shading was replaced by a simpler white gloss, and a solid, two-dimensional version of the logo was used more frequently in marketing. Network staff stated that this version of the logo was intended to make it more "alive" and diverse, and make it better-suited for multi-platform use.

By 2021, as part of a wider reorganization of Globo's media assets, Rede Globo had begun to phase in a rebranding to "TV Globo" (stylized in lowercase as "tvglobo"). TV Globo unveiled a revamped logo and identity in December 2021, developed by a team led by new chief art director Ricardo Moyano (who replaces the outgoing Donner). The three-dimensional version of Globo's new logo carries a softer, shaded appearance, and replaced the rainbow motif with variants of the logos carrying different fluorescent color schemes. The new branding was phased in across Globo's on-air presentation and programming throughout 2022.

On 1 December 2024, to commemorate the 100th anniversary of Grupo Globo and the 60th anniversary of the network, TV Globo updated the color palette of their logo variations, restricting to the main network's colors, orange for entertainment, blue for news, and green for sports. Although an updated version of the logo already appeared at social media and TV promos, three different versions of the logo are concurrently used with the 2025 logo that reinstates the rainbow-colored screen (after three years; representing the entire network) since 2 April 2025.

== Availability ==
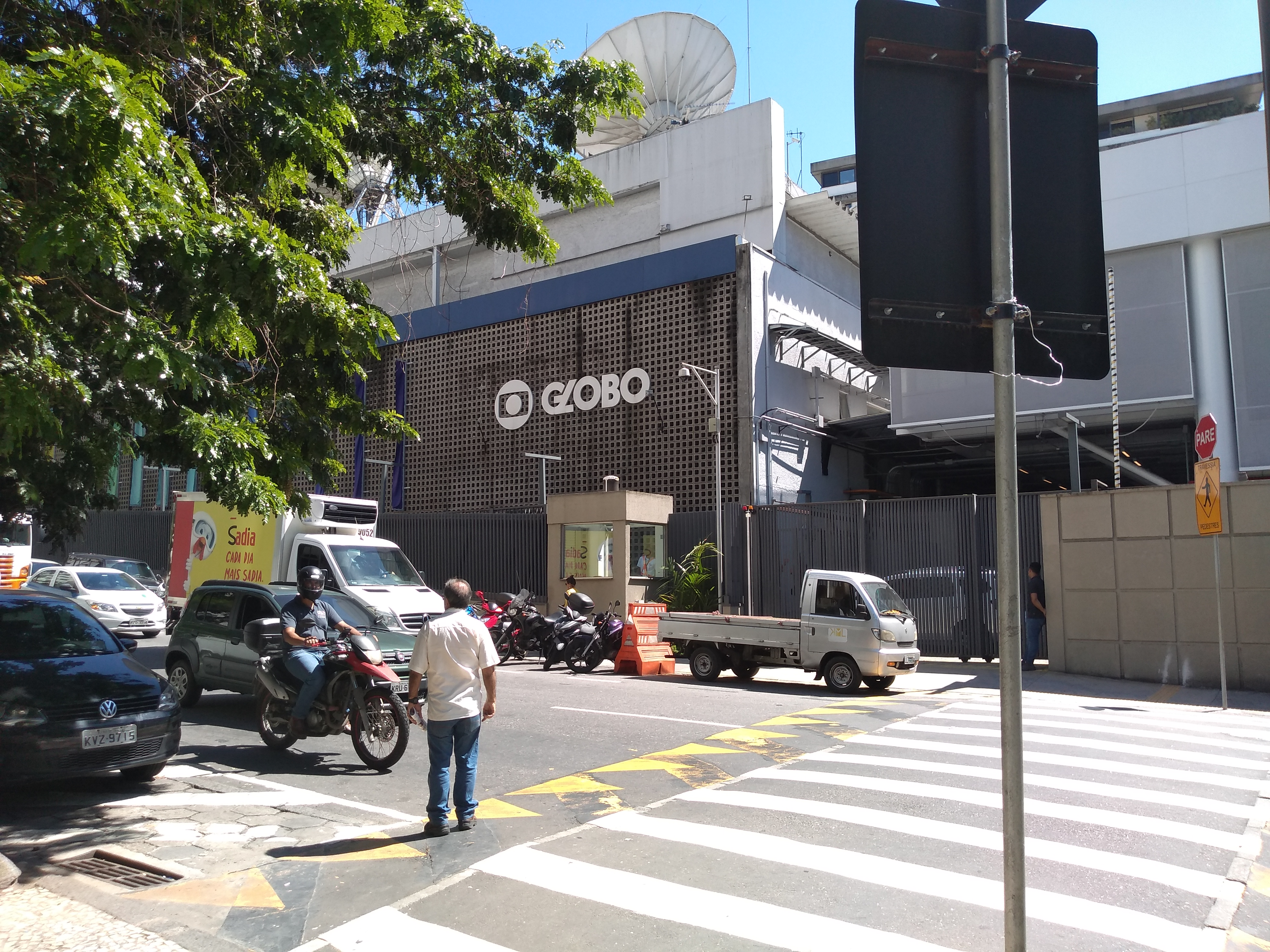
Headquarters of TV Globo in Rio de Janeiro.

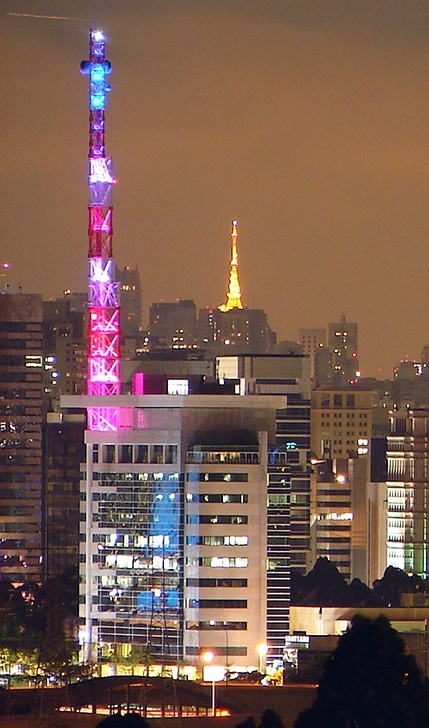
Headquarters of TV Globo São Paulo adjacent to the Jornalista Roberto Marinho Building.

TV Globo is broadcast in free-to-air analog and digital television, in standard definition and 1080i high definition. On 2 December 2007, test simulcasts for 1080i begin in the São Paulo market; Rio de Janeiro, Brasília and Belo Horizonte followed in February 2008, with other capitals following in the next months. Prior to this, Globo had provided 480i standard definition service.

Globo is broadcast in metropolitan areas through a number of owned-and-operated stations, including Globo Rio de Janeiro (Rio de Janeiro), Globo São Paulo (São Paulo), Globo DF (Brasília), Globo Minas (Belo Horizonte), and Globo Pernambuco (Recife). They are joined by 120 third-party affiliates serving regional markets; combined, Globo's terrestrial signals serve approximately 98.53% of the country.

To serve rural regions not served directly by Globo's terrestrial signals, the network provided a national analogue satellite feed from 1982 through August 2024, when the signal was discontinued. Globo began to deploy a digital replacement known as SAT HD Regional, in November 2011; the new service is capable of carrying regionalised signals in partnership with Globo affiliates. It originally broadcast on C band satellite; in 2022, it was moved to Ku band, as part of a nationwide phase-out of free-to-air satellite on C-band in order to accommodate 5G wireless signals.

=== International distribution ===
Launched in 1999 and now with more than 620,000 subscribers, as of 2012, TV Globo Internacional has been operating satellite television channels worldwide, including in the Americas, Portugal, the Middle East, and Africa, bringing a mix of entertainment, news and sports programming sourced from TV Globo, GNT, Globo News, Canal Viva, Canal Futura and SporTV, to Brazilian and other Portuguese-speaking people (Lusophones). Two distinct international feeds originate live and directly to viewers around the world from the network's broadcast center located in Rio de Janeiro, the Europe/Africa/Middle East feed and the Americas feed. A third Asia feed originates from Japan by IPC.

TV Globo Portugal is a subsidiary of Rede Globo based in Lisbon. It airs three channels for Portugal and the international versions of TV Globo for Europe and Africa. Globo Premium and PFC (Brazilian football) channels are available across platforms as premium channels. A similar basic cable and satellite Globo channel is currently available on NOS platforms on channel 10, as an exclusive due to a contractual agreement. TV Globo channels in Portugal differ from other Globo channels due to contractual agreements with SIC network in Portugal, which holds first run rights to some Globo programming such as telenovelas.

In the United States, Globo Internacional is available nationwide in standard definition via satellite services (Dish Network, and DirecTV) (which also offer Globosat's Brazil football coverage channel Premiere Futebol Clube) and by Over-the-top IPTV provider Dishworld. In the U.S., various cable operators like Charter Spectrum in New York; Comcast in Miami, Boston, New Jersey; Bright House Networks in Orlando, Tampa; RCN in Boston and Atlantic Broadband in Atlanta carry the channel on their systems as Switched video. In Canada, it is available through Rogers Cable and the NEXTV IPTV service, and in Mexico and South American countries, it can be seen on SKY satellite. Globo Internacional was broadcast in Australia and New Zealand via UBI World TV until June 2012 when UBI ceased operations.

=== Online ===
Launched in 2000, Globo.com is the Internet portal arm of the company and has large historical video library and provides part of current content recorded and live TV news and special shows such as Big Brother Brasil. It broadcast the World Cup 2006 games live in 480i and 480p. The portal also provides large access to media conglomerate products such magazines, newspapers and live radio. The domain attracted at least 1.8 million visitors annually by 2008 according to a Compete.com study and is ranked 104th most accessed site in the world according to Alexa.

==== Globoplay ====
Globoplay is a digital video streaming platform on demand created and developed with the idea of Valdir Miranda who registered the domain in 2013 and added an idea for Grupo Globo, which had its launch done on October 26, 2015. In 2020, it established a brand of 20 million users and became a national leader in streaming. The application has been available since November 3, 2015 through the App Store and Google Play. Also, it has a web OS version from LG Electronics. The web version can be accessed on the company's website. In February 2016, the mobile app gained compatibility with Chromecast. Are being developed for TV's from Samsung, Philips, LG Electronics, Panasonic, and in April 2017, a TCL launch of the P2 Ultra HD TV, whose remote control has a power button.

== Stations ==
- List of TV Globo affiliates
