= Estúdios Globo =

Brazilian television production company

Coordinates: 22°57′31.36″S 43°24′23.72″W

- Formerly: Central Globo de Produção
- Type: Division
- Industry: Film production; Television production
- Founded: 1995
- Headquarters: Rio de Janeiro, Brazil
- Owner: Grupo Globo
- Parent: Globo

Estúdios Globo (Globo Studios, in English) is Grupo Globo's television production arm and Latin America's largest audio-visual production center. Before its current name, it was also known as Central Globo de Produção (Globo Production Center) which was displayed as a label in the credits of its shows. Additionally, it was referred to as Projac, an acronym for Projeto Jacarepaguá, when referring to its production complex inaugurated in 1995.

Estúdios Globo's lot, located between the neighborhoods of Curicica and Jacarepaguá, is the largest television production center in the world, with an area of 1,600 km^{2} (620 sq mi), housing studios, fictional cities, islands of editing, post production, special effects, factory settings, costumes, technical support to production, administration and services.

Currently, its facilities holds thirteen recording studios, three snack bars, a restaurant, and a bank. They are often building new studios, centers support to fictional cities, a theater and an administrative building.

== History ==
=== Before Projac ===
Rede Globo's former studios, which opened in 1965, were too small for the station's productions. In 1975, the Teatro Fênix (English: Phoenix Theater) was inaugurated, for the production of auditorium programs. Later in 1980, it was discovered that the station's facilities would become improper in a short period of time. Rede Globo's productions studios name is Central Globo de Produção (English: Globo Production Center).

=== Projeto Jacarepaguá ===
Projac (which was then called the Jacarepaguá Project) was designed to house the studios, administration, production, direction; and leave the Botanical Garden. The greatness of Projac, between conception and inauguration, constitutes an undertaking that took almost fifteen years to be completed. In the long interval between the departure of Globo from its former studios and the definitive entry into Projac, the broadcaster rented other spaces, such as Atlântida Cinematográfica, Cyll Farney's Tycoon studios, part of Renato Aragão's studios, TV Tupi's studios at the old Cassino da Urca, Pólo Rio de Cinema e Vídeo and the Herbert Richers studios, besides producing some programs at the Teatro Fênix.

=== From Projac to Estúdios Globo ===
As of February 25, 2016, the name of the complex changed from Projac to Estúdios Globo, as the new board retired the old name due to the name "Projac" being no longer considered a strong and modern title.

=== The opening of MG4 ===
On August 8, 2019, a new complex called Production Module 4 (MG4) was inaugurated, incorporating three new studios (K, L, M), with an area of 26,000 m². The complex now occupies a total area of 1.73 million m², with thirteen production studios, expanding the production capacity of soap operas, series, miniseries, realities, original formats, humor shows and varieties.

== Productions ==
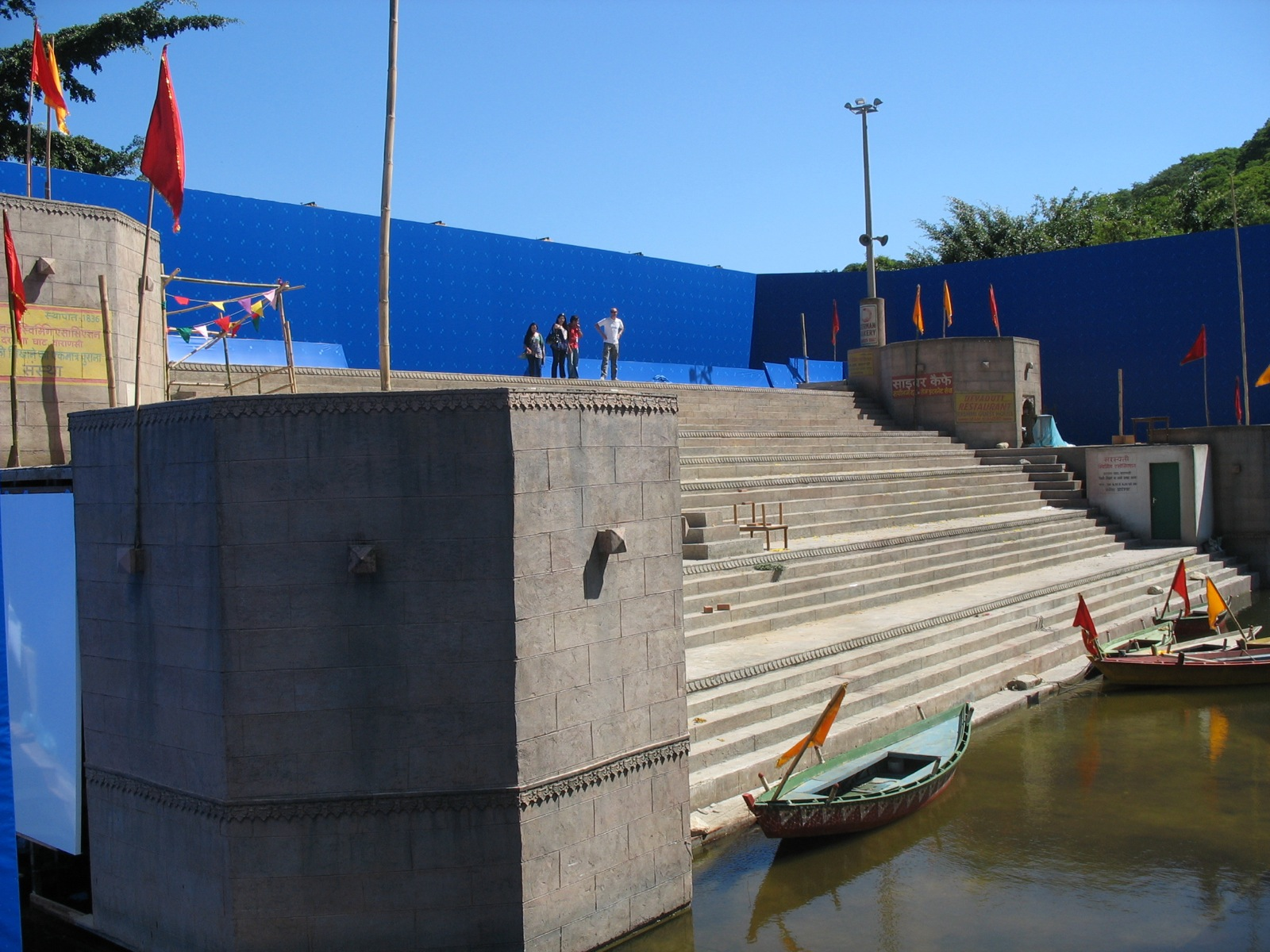
Reproduction of Ganges River to the telenovela India – A Love Story in scenographic city of Estúdios Globo.

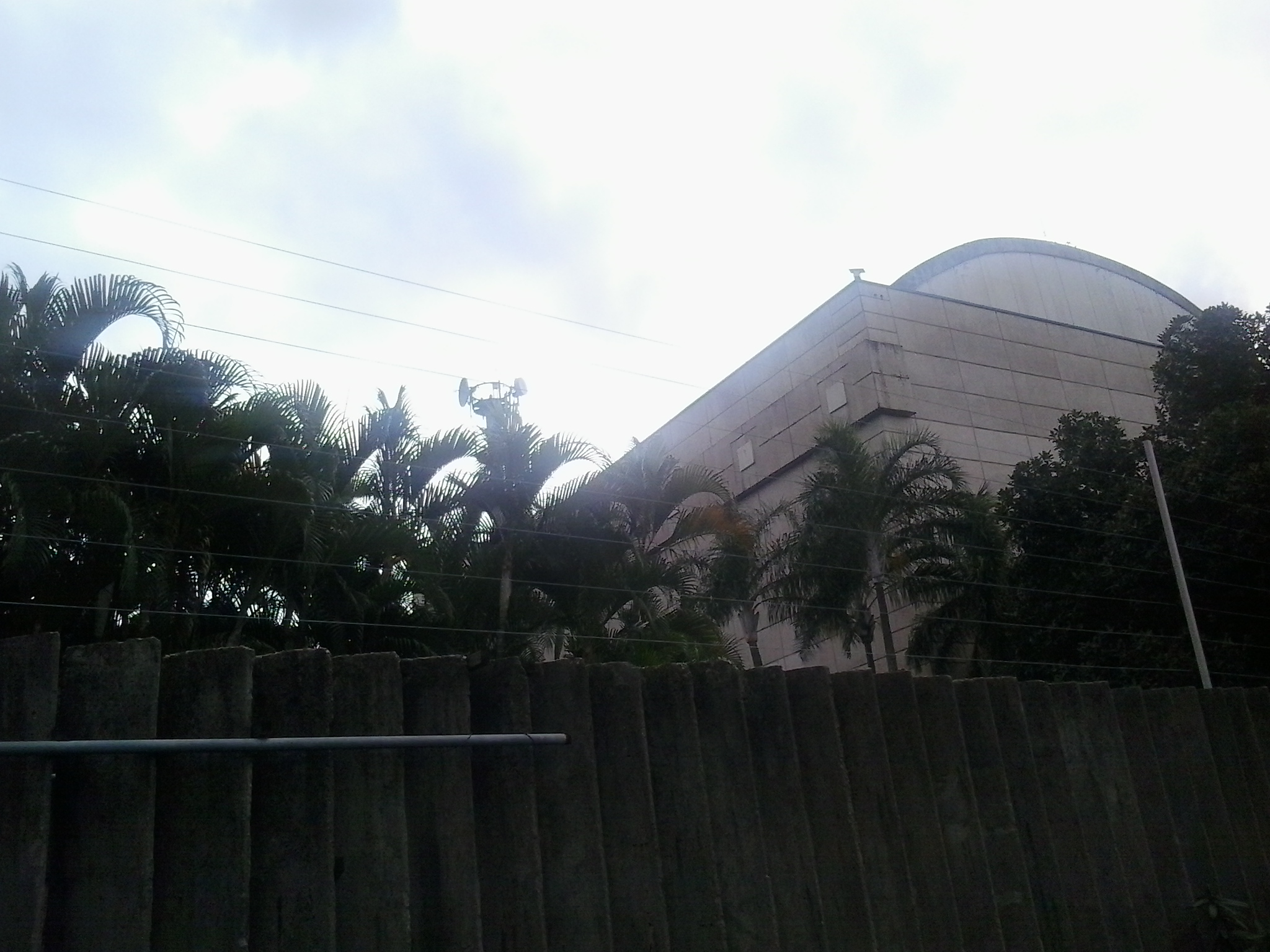
Globo Studios

== Split of studios ==
Studio A

Vacant

Studio B

Vacant

Studio C

Vacant

Studio D

Vacant

Studio E

- Caldeirão com Mion

Studio F

- Lady Night (for the Multishow)
- "Quem quer Ser um Milionário?" (attraction of Domingão com Huck)

Studio G

Vacant

Studio H

- Todas as Flores

Studio I

Vacant

Studio J

- Sob Pressão
- Ilha de Ferro
- Se eu Fechar os Olhos Agora

Studio K

Vacant

Studio L

Vacant

Studio M

Vacant

Programs and stations recorded elsewhere in the complex

- É de Casa
- Big Brother Brasil
- Rádio Globo
- Estrela da Casa
