= Grupo Globo =

Brazilian media group

Organizações Globo Participações S.A.

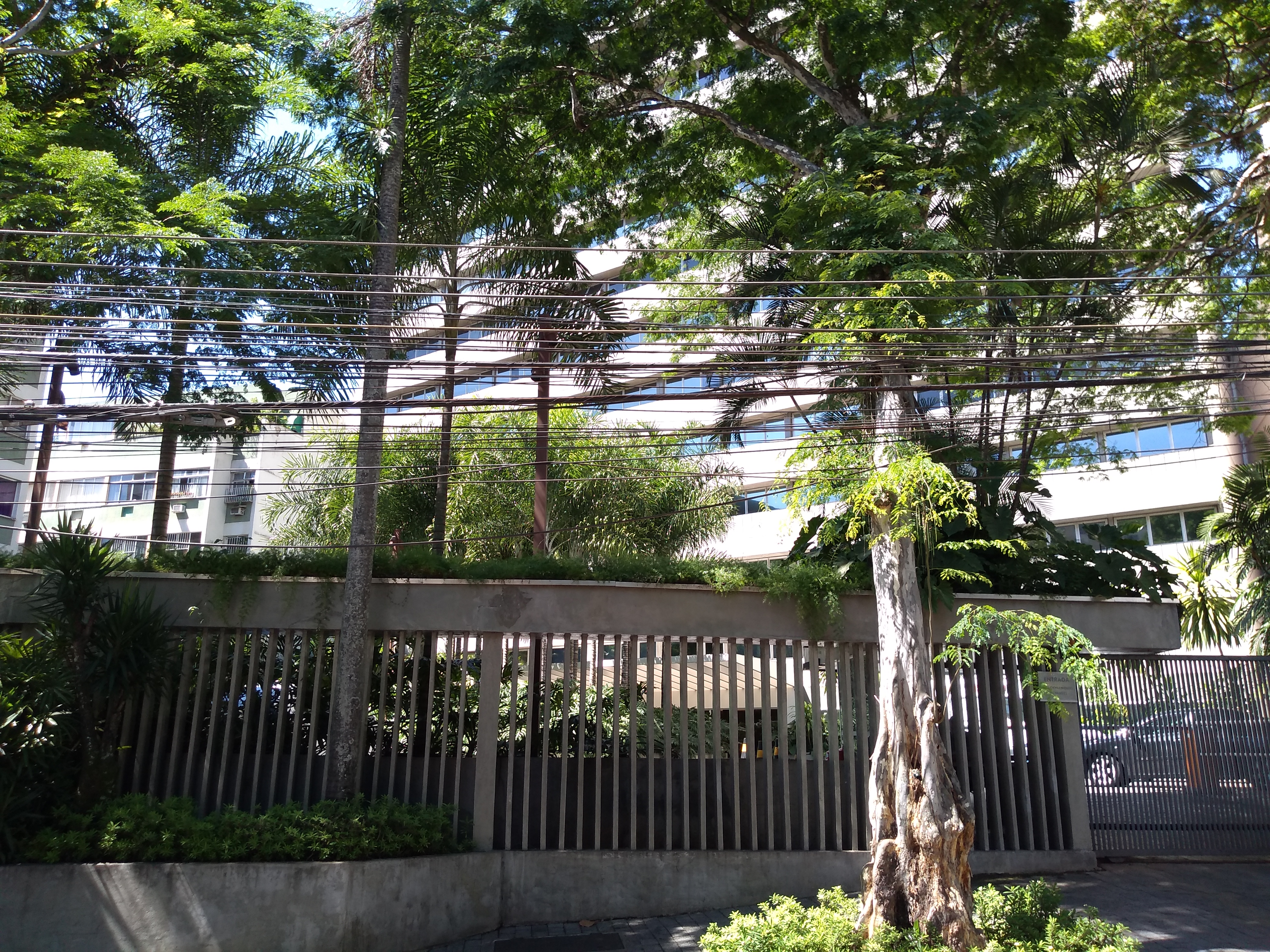
- Headquarters in Rio de Janeiro, Brazil
- Trade name: Grupo Globo
- Type: Private
- Industry: Media
- Founded: 25 July 1925; 101 years ago
- Founder: Irineu Marinho
- Headquarters: Rio de Janeiro, Brazil
- Area served: Worldwide
- Key people: João Roberto Marinho (Chairman & President); Roberto Irineu Marinho (Vice chairman); José Roberto Marinho (Vice chairman)
- Products: Television networks; Radio stations; Internet services; Satellite television; Newspapers; Magazines; Music industry
- Brands: TV Globo; GloboNews; GNT; Multishow; SporTV; Viva; Gloob; Telecine; O Globo; Globoplay
- Revenue: ▼US$4.4 billion (2017)
- Total equity: ▲US$542.5 million (2016)
- Owner: Marinho family
- Subsidiaries: Globo; Editora Globo; Sistema Globo de Rádio
- Website: grupoglobo.globo.com

Grupo Globo (Portuguese pronunciation: [ˈɡɾu.pu ˈɡlo.bu]; lit. 'Globe Group'), formerly and still legally known as Organizações Globo ([oʁ.ɡa.ni.zaˈsõj̃s ˈɡlo.bu]; lit. 'Globe Organization'), is a Brazilian private entertainment and mass media conglomerate based in Rio de Janeiro, Brazil. Founded in 1925 by Irineu Marinho, it is the largest media group in Latin America, and one of the world's largest media conglomerates.

Grupo Globo's assets comprise over-the-air broadcasting, television and film production, pay television subscription service, streaming media, publishing, and online services. Its main properties include media company Globo, consisting of the flagship television network TV Globo; the streaming service Globoplay, pay television content unit Canais Globo, consisting of cable television networks such as GloboNews, GNT, Multishow, SporTV, Viva, Gloob, and the premium film network Telecine; film production company Globo Filmes; radio operator Sistema Globo de Rádio and magazine and newspaper publisher, Editora Globo, including Infoglobo.

== History ==
Logo of Globo's 100th anniversary (2025)

The company's first enterprise was the newspaper A Noite. With its success, publishing in the late afternoon, Irineu Marinho decided to launch the morning daily O Globo in 1925. After his sudden death, just weeks after its launch, his son, Roberto Pisani Marinho, became the company's director. Working actively in the media business, Roberto Marinho decided to invest in other areas and launched Radio Globo in 1944. However, the company only became recognizable nationwide after the launching of Rede Globo (now known as TV Globo), the world's second-largest commercial TV network in 1965.

The company is currently run by the sons of Roberto Marinho: Roberto Irineu Marinho, João Roberto Marinho and José Roberto Marinho. In May 2013, a study released by media agency ZenithOptimedia showed Globo occupied the 17th place in a list of the top global media owners. It was the first time the company appeared on this ranking. This ranking remained in 2015, but in 2017 the company's fell to 19th place, and in June of the same year Grupo Globo signed a joint venture deal with Vice Media.

== Assets owned by Grupo Globo ==
=== Globo ===
==== Free-to-air television ====
- TV Globo
- Futura

==== Pay television ====
- Bis
- Canal Brasil
- GloboNews
- Gloob
- GNT
- Multishow
- Playboy TV
- Premiere
- Rede Telecine
- Sexy Hot
- SporTV
- Globoplay Novelas
- NBCUniversal International Networks Brasil (joint-venture with Comcast/NBCUniversal)
  - Universal TV
  - Studio Universal
  - USA
- TV Globo Internacional
  - Globo Portugal
    - Globo Now
  - Globo On (Africa)

==== Film and television production ====
- Estúdios Globo
- Globo Filmes

==== Internet ====
- Globo.com
  - G1
- Globoplay

=== Radio ===
- Sistema Globo de Rádio
  - CBN
  - Rádio Globo

=== Books, newspapers and magazines ===
- Editora Globo
  - Extra
  - O Globo
  - Valor Econômico

=== Former properties ===
- Som Livre (Acquired by Sony Music in April 2021)
- SKY Brasil (Vrio Corp. acquired the 7% stake in Grupo Globo)
- Telemontecarlo (1985–1994, acquired by Vittorio Cecchi Gori)
- Retequattro (1982-1985?), acquired by Silvio Berlusconi Communications, now Mediaset
