= SKY Brasil =

Direct broadcast satellite company

Sky Brasil
- Logo used since 2026
- Type: Subsidiary
- Industry: Telecommunication
- Predecessor: DirecTV Brasil
- Founded: 11 November 1996; 29 years ago
- Founder: Roberto Marinho; Sky
- Headquarters: Santana de Parnaíba, São Paulo, Brazil
- Products: Pay television 4G LTE
- Parent: Vrio
- Website: www.sky.com.br

Sky Brasil is a company, owned by Vrio, which operates a subscription television service in Brazil. It produces TV content, and owns several TV channels.

== History ==
Sky Mexico was founded on 25 July 1996, a joint venture between British Sky Broadcasting (BSkyB), News Corporation, Liberty Media and Grupo Televisa and was later launched on 15 December 1996. At the same time it was being set up in Brazil, where it involved BSkyB, News Corporation, Liberty Media and Organizações Globo. By May 2000, the company had extended throughout the rest of Latin America, launching in Central America, Argentina and Colombia but during Argentina's economic crisis, on 10 July 2002, with over 52,000 subscribers, Sky Argentina ceased all operations.

Negotiations to carry the over-the-air signal of TV Globo were stalled due to pressure from affiliates and concerns from rights issues. In February 1997 it was announced that Fox Kids would launch in Brazil exclusively on the operator in March 1997. On 4 February that year, the Spanish-language feed was launched on the operator in Spanish-speaking markets. Cable companies would only add the channel in April due to dependence on decoders. The channel eventually launched on the operator on 8 April; the week before, Bloomberg and CNN en Español were added. On 16 April, Sky announced the start of PPV sports broadcasts, with subscribers receiving ten matches of the Brazilian Football League. That same month, Sky reportedly surpassed 30,000 subscribers, less than half of DirecTV's 70,000.

In July 1997, Sky was studying the possibility of direct sales via telemarketing, as well as the usage of Pace decoders which were supplied to Gradiente, Sky's technical partner. Later that month it was announced that Gradiente's installers would used and 20,000 decoders were to be installed in an initial phase.

Sky uplinked its first Globo affiliates, all of them owned-and-operated stations, in November 1997: TV Globo Rio, TV Globo São Paulo and TV Globo Minas. The entrance of these stations was a test to see if Globo contributed to its presence bringing gains to the provider, as well as possible cost-benefit relations for other non-O&O affiliates to join the service in key cities. These were added on 5 December 1997 in Rio de Janeiro and Belo Horizonte, with no date set for the São Paulo metropolitan area.

Sky was growing faster than DirecTV in terms of subscribers in March 1998, but the overall number of subscribers was still slightly lower. In July 1998, TV Globo São Paulo and RBS TV Porto Alegre were uplinked. There were chances for affiliates in São Paulo's inland to be added, but at the time, this was not confirmed yet. Globo São Paulo was not added to the system until 21 August 1998. Out of the O&Os, only Recife and Brasília were not present yet. The entrance of Globo's stations in the system did not cause a massive increase in the cities that had an affiliate available, implying that Sky was gaining more subscribers outside these cities.

Animal Planet was added on 25 June 1999. Playboy TV was added on 15 July, breaking its exclusivity contract with DirecTV. MTV Brasil followed on 19 August, on the date of that year's edition of Video Music Brasil. On 22 October, Sony and Warner Channel were added. The HBOLAG exclusivity contract with DirecTV only affected the company's premium channels.

On 15 February 2000, it was announced that Sky would hold a five-year DTH exclusivity contract to carry PSN. It started carrying TV Bahia in Salvador as the fifth Globo affiliate in the system on 23 June 2000. As of 30 September 2000, SKY had 600,000 subscribers, including subscribers who were temporarily disconnected. The interactive TV platform was pending arrival because of middleware problems, as SKY was set to use another standard unlike DirecTV. The operator alongside NET was the first in line to add the Brazilian version of National Geographic Channel in September 2000, while on 28 December 2000, SKY's satellite at the time, PAS-6B, was legalized. 2000 ended with the arrival of the first interactive services, starting with enhanced TV functions for the João Havelange Cup, using SporTV and Globo's cameras and resources. SKY's survey suggested that 84% of subscribers were interested in seeing the alternate angles of the matches.

In August 2001, EPTV Campinas started broadcasting on SKY, becoming the first affiliate outside of a state capital to enter the system. For the local trade, SKY had to order new Philips decoders due to its launch on the platform, for the first time since June 2001, which was affected by the energy crisis. On 8 August, Elsys became the third company to provide decoders, using Motorola's technology. In November 2001, TV Vanguarda São José dos Campos was added as the seventh Globo affiliate on the system. On 4 December, SKY announced its interactive TV services, without a definitive launch date, with the enhanced TV function being used for the Globosat channels during certain programming. On 31 December 2001, subscribers in the metropolitan areas of São Paulo and Rio de Janeiro were the first to experience an interactive service, in this case the St. Sylvester Marathon, with Globo providing data and historical facts. Negotiations were made with Disney to allow its movies to be on the pay-per-view system, at a time when both Disney and SKY were holding discussions for the continuation of the carriage of Fox Kids, which had just been acquired by Disney.

The first edition of Big Brother Brasil also had interactive resources, with the live feed being offered as a pay-per-view service. Said service excluded certain scenes which were reserved for the broadcast on Globo and Multishow, much to the infuriation of subscribers. During Globo's sale of assets in July 2002, Globopar announced a cut from the shareholder structure of SKY, with News Corporation becoming the main shareholder. SKY lost its subscriber base for the first time in its history due to currency devaluation and the cost of the rights to carry the 2002 FIFA World Cup. An interactive function was added to Globo News on 27 August 2002, with data from the channel's website, becoming the first news channel in Latin America to do so. Traffic information from the Climatempo database for Rio de Janeiro and São Paulo was added in September; Climatempo was already responsible for the interactive weather service. On 18 October, the PPV service aired the six episodes of Globo's Os Normais from the recently released DVD of the series. At the time, some then-recent Globo series were being added to the service, the others at the time being the new version of Sítio do Pica-Pau Amarelo and the 2000 miniseries A Muralha. The Globo News interactive service was also used for the 2002 elections. On 1 November 2002, Fox News was added, after being introduced at ABTA 2002. The channel got interactive functions from 8 January 2003 exclusively on SKY.

On 1 February 2003, Eurochannel was added to the platform. Still in February, it was announced that News Corporation's stake would increase in July. The operator and Fox announced the creation of Amigos do Cinema in April 2003 with the aim of restoring old Brazilian movies. As of the first quarter of 2003, SKY had arrived to 740,000 subscribers. In October it announced the arrival of PVRs in November, while on 4 November it adopted a new logo (still in use) and launched a schedule magazine for subscribers, akin to Net's Monet.

Rumors of the merger of the SKY and DirecTV operators in Latin America have been circulating since at least 2002; in early 2004, Rupert Murdoch announced a unification plan, which also included a platform for Mexico, where Televisa would own 50% of its shares. When Fox Kids was renamed Jetix on 1 August 2004, Sky hadn't entered an agreement with Disney to carry Disney Channel. Still in August, SKY replaced RTP Internacional with SIC Internacional.

During the course of the decade, most Sky operations in Latin America were rebranded to DirecTV, with the exception of the Mexican and Brazilian operations, that in 2005 absorbed the DirecTV keeping the Sky name. The announcement of the merger of the operations started in October 2004, which ended the pan-regional alliance (SKY Multi-Country) outside of Mexico and Brazil. The merger in Brazil was dependent on regulatory approval. On 29 June 2005, SKY launched Playgirl TV, an adult channel targeting a heterosexual female audience; earlier in the year, its distributor Cable Entertainment Distribution launched Hentai. Both channels operated in pay-per-view format. VH1 Soul and MTV Hits also launched in June. The first high definition tests took place on 2 August 2005 during that year's ABTA convention, with special content from HBO, Fox and Discovery. The entrance of the HBO channels in August prompted TVE Brasil and TV Câmara to change their slots, much to TVE Brasil's annoyance.

As of year-end 2005, SKY had 950,000 subscribers, hoping to reach the 1 million milestone in July. With the merger underway, SKY started migrating its uplink from Rio de Janeiro to Tamboré in July 2006, a process that was expected to end in October. On 14 September, SKY launched new packages, as well as the arrival of new channels that were on DirecTV, those being Animax, Discovery Travel & Living, Disney Channel, Hallmark, TCM Classic Hollywood, The Golf Channel and VH1, as well as TV Cultura's TV Rá-Tim-Bum. There were supposed to be ten new channels added, as BandNews and BandSports were already uplinked on the satellite, but SKY hadn't added the channels yet. The two channels, still on the outgoing DirecTV, were not yet added due to lack of answers from Band. In October, SKY+DIRECTV was the new temporary name of the combined operator. Initially it was suggested that only the SKY brand would be used, on the grounds that it had the most subscribers, but was rejected by the company's directives.

Logo used from 2007 to 2026

In March 2007, the temporary brand was replaced by SKY, introducing its new slogan TV é isso (That's TV). Fox Life was added in April. In August, Speed Channel, Fashion TV Brasil, Sci Fi, ManagemenTV and Sex Zone were added. That same month, TVE Brasil (months away from its replacement by TV Brasil) moved to channel 116.

In May 2009, Sky Brazil launched its first ten HDTV channels in 1080i resolution (with the exception of ESPN HD (today ESPN+), which broadcasts in 720p). Currently, Sky Brazil has 57 channels in HDTV in total (note: Sex Zone HD is optional).

In 2016, Sky Brazil reached more than 5.3 million subscribers, ranking as second in number of subscribers in Brazil.

In 2022, Grupo Globo divested their 7% stake in SKY Brasil, making Vrio their full 100% owner.

== Services ==
- Cine SKY - movie rental service
- Cine SKY HD - video on demand service (exclusive to Sky HDTV Plus subscribers) (used to be Sky On Demand)
- SKY Online - TV Everywhere service
- SKY Banda Larga (Sky Broadband) - 4G Internet via LTE routers
- SKY Tunes - online audio channels via iOS
- TVRO SKY Free SATHDR (TVRO Sky free SATHDR) - digital decoder with free TV 24 channels UHF and DTH TV Globo, SBT, Record, RedeTV!, Band, TV Verdes Mares CE Nacional and Regional
- Viva SKY - loyalty program

== See also ==
- DirecTV Latin America
- Sky México
