= Globo (Portuguese TV channel) =

- Country: Portugal
- Broadcast area: Portugal

Programming
- Picture format: 1080i HDTV (downscaled to 16:9 576i for the SDTV feed)

Ownership
- Owner: Globo Portugal (Globo)
- Sister channels: Globo News

History
- Launched: 10 November 2012

Links
- Website: Globo Portugal

Globo is a Portuguese pay television channel owned by TV Globo, a Brazilian television network. Its programming is taken from TV Globo or GloboNews, along with Brazilian cinema. Its flagship programming are Globo's Brazilian telenovelas. It also broadcasts television series and sitcoms.

== History ==
Former Globo logo, used until 2020

The channel launched on 10 November 2012 as ZON-only exclusive, unlike TV Globo Portugal. The channel decided to concentrate its line-up primarily on entertainment.

With the launch of Globo Portugal on MEO on 17 April 2018, the channel not only became available on all four subscription television providers, but also relaunched its two channels with a new look, and renaming Globo Premium as Globo Now.
