= Futura (TV channel) =

Brazilian educational television channel

Canal Futura
- Logo used since 2022
- Type: Free-to-air television channel
- Country: Brazil
- Headquarters: Rio de Janeiro, RJ, Brazil

Programming
- Language: Portuguese
- Picture format: 1080i HDTV

Ownership
- Owner: Fundação Roberto Marinho (Grupo Globo)

History
- Launched: 22 September 1997; 28 years ago

Links
- Webcast: globoplay.globo.com (subscription required, available only in Brazil)
- Website: www.futura.frm.org.br

Canal Futura (Futura Channel), also known as Futura, is a Brazilian paid educational television channel. It is owned by Fundação Roberto Marinho, the philanthropy branch of Grupo Globo, operated by Globo and was founded on September 22, 1997. The channel of the station is captured on cable TV operators, and satellite dishes.

Futura is mainly aimed at classes C and D, and is aimed at young people, workers, housewives and educators. Its goal is that all the productions exhibited can be seen and used by the widest range of people, the city and the countryside.

By 2015 the channel was also heavily focused on children, broadcasting cartoons similar to TV Cultura, but they were removed in favor of Gloob. However, in 2021, Canal Futura returned with its children's programming.
