= Premiere (Brazilian TV channel) =

Brazilian pay sports television channel

- Country: Brazil
- Broadcast area: Worldwide
- Headquarters: Rio de Janeiro, Rio de Janeiro

Programming
- Language: Portuguese
- Picture format: 1080i HDTV (downscaled to 480i/576i for the SD feed)

Ownership
- Owner: Canais Globo (Grupo Globo)
- Sister channels: SporTV

History
- Launched: 1997 (Premiere); 2007 (PFC Internacional)
- Former names: Premiere Esportes (1997–2006); Premiere Futebol Clube (2006–2011); Premiere FC (2011–2013)

Links
- Webcast: globoplay.globo.com (subscription required)
- Website: premiere.globo.com

Availability

Streaming media
- Sling TV (United States): Internet Protocol television

Premiere is a Brazilian television channel on pay-per-view broadcasts the main football State Championships in Brazil, and the Brazilian Championship Série A and Série B. Being part of Canais Globo, it is available on television providers such as SKY, Claro TV and Vivo TV, and some operators outside the country, such as MEO and NOS. From 1997 to 2006 it was called Premiere Esportes, switching to Premiere Futebol Clube and then to PFC, but in 2011 moved again, this time to Premiere FC, and finally to Premiere starting in 2013.

== Team sports ==
=== Narrators ===
- Minas Gerais: Rogério Corrêa and Rodrigo Franco
- Pernambuco: Denis Medeiros
- Rio de Janeiro: Antero Neto, Bernardo Edler, Bruno Fonseca, Claudio Uchôa, Daniel Pereira, Eduardo Moreno, Eusebio Resende, Gustavo Villani, Jader Rocha, Julio Oliveira, Leandro Chaves, Luiz Carlos Júnior, Luiz Felipe Prota, Márcio Meneghini, Renata Silveira and Rhoodes Lima
- São Paulo: André Felipe, Everaldo Marques, Gustavo Villani, Isabelly Morais, Letícia Pinho, Natália Lara, Odinei Ribeiro, Paulo Andrade, Sergio Arenillas and Vinicius Rodrigues

=== Commentators ===
- Minas Gerais: Fábio Júnior and Henrique Fernandes
- Pernambuco: Cabral Neto and Danny Morais
- Rio de Janeiro: Ana Thaís Matos, André Loffredo, Carlos Eduardo Lino, Carlos Eduardo Mansur, Eric Faria, Grafite, Jessica Cescon, Júnior, Ledio Carmona, Marcelo Raed, Marcelo Rodrigues, Paulo Cesar Vasconcellos, Paulo Nunes, Pedro Moreno, Ramon Motta, Renata Mendonça, Ricardo Gonzalez, Richarlyson, Rodrigo Coutinho, Roger Flores.
- Rio Grande do Sul: Diogo Olivier and Mauricio Saraiva
- São Paulo: Alexandre Lozetti, Alline Calandrini, Caio Ribeiro, Jordana Araújo, Ricardinho and Sergio Xavier Filho

=== Central do Apito ===
- Paulo César de Oliveira

=== Reporters ===
- Alagoas: Andréa Resende and Ricardo Amaral
- Bahia: Camila Oliveira, Costta Filho, Daniela Leone, Danilo Ribeiro, Eduardo Oliveira, Gabriela Gomes, Renan Pinheiro and Thiago Reis.
- Ceará: Beatriz Carvalho, Caio Ricard, Lucas Catrib, Marta Negreiros and Raísa Martins.
- Distrito Federal: André Barroso and Karina Azevedo.
- Goiás: Karla Izumi, Rafael Sebba, Rodrigo Castro and Victor Hugo Araújo.
- Maranhão: Werton Araújo
- Mato Grosso: Flávio Santos
- Minas Gerais: Giovanna Pires, Guto Rabelo, Ludi Cianci, Maria Cláudia Bonutti, Raphaela Potter, Rodrigo Rocha and Roger Casé.
- Pará: André Laurent
- Paraná: André Cavalcante, Evandro Harenza, Juliana Fontes and Nadja Mauad
- Pernambuco: Diogo Marques, Juan Torres, Sabrina Rocha, Sarah Porto, Thiago Ribeiro and Victor Andrade.
- Rio de Janeiro: André Gallindo, André Pessoa, Anna Flávia Nunes, Bruno Halpern, Camila Barbieri, Débora Gares, Diego Morais, Duda Dalponte, Edson Viana, Fábio Juppa, Juliano Lima, Karin Duarte, Kiko Menezes, Klaus Barbosa, Lívia Laranjeira, Lucas de Senna, Marcelo Couregge, Pedro Neville, Raphael de Angeli, Ricardo Lay, Richard Souza and Sofia Miranda
- Rio Grande do Sul: Arildo Palermo, Bruno Marsilli, Fernando Becker, Kelly Costa, Leonardo Muller, Mateus Trindade, Maurício Gasparetto, Mylena Acosta, Paula Menezes and Rodrigo Cordeiro.
- Santa Catarina: Alisson Francisco, Carlos Rauen, Cristian de los Santos, Eduardo Prestes, Isabela Corrêa, Marcelo Siqueira and Ronaldo Fontana.
- São Paulo: Amanda Barbosa, Débora Carvalho, Denise Thomaz Bastos, Diego Alves, Edgar Alencar, Emanoel Araújo, Estella Gomes, Felipe Brisolla, Fernando Vidotto, Filipe Cury, Gabriela Ribeiro, Guilherme Roseguini, Gustavo Biano, Joanna de Assis, José Renato Ambrósio, Júlia Dotto, Mariana Lo Turco, Matheus Ribeiro, Murilo Tauro, Pedro Rocha, Plácido Berci, Renato Cury and Renato Peters
- Sergipe: Guilherme Fraga

== Championships broadcast by Premiere ==
=== Nationals ===
- (Brazil) Brasileirão Série A (9 games between LIBRA and LFU teams)
- (Brazil) Copa do Brasil

=== Regionals ===
- Campeonato Carioca
- Campeonato Mineiro
- Campeonato Gaucho
- Copa do Nordeste

== Premiere Clubes ==
Premiere FC created a channel for all its subscribers, with 24 hours of football per day, Premiere Clubes. With reruns of games all day, since 1993 until today. Every person that signs the Premiere Futebol Clube automatically gets the channel Premiere Clubes.

== PFC Internacional ==
The PFC Internacional (or Premiere Internacional) was launched in 2007. It's the first Brazilian sports channel focused on international audience. Produced by Canais Globo, the channel is available in more than 33 countries (Indonesia, Cuba, Portugal, Curaçao, Mozambique, Angola, Puerto Rico, Trinidad and Tobago, France, Spain, Argentina, Paraguay, Uruguay, Chile, Bolivia, Panama, Costa Rica, Honduras, Guatemala, El Salvador, Dominican Republic, Mexico, Peru, Venezuela and Japan). According to Premiere, more than 600 Brazilian football games are broadcast live by the channel every year.

The channel ceased operating in Portugal on 28 February 2025 with no clear rationale, though it is suggested that it had to do with the loss of its rights to Brasileirão matches.

=== Programming ===
PFC Internacional's programming consists in football matches and SporTV shows. From January to May, the channel focuses in broadcasting the state championships and from May to December in broadcasting the national championship. According to Premiere, the channel airs more than 600 Brazilian football matches live every year.

When football matches are not being shown, SporTV shows like Baú do Esporte, Bem, Amigos!, Esporte Espetacular, Giro da Rodada, Globo Esporte Brasil, Grande Círculo are broadcast. Redação SporTV, Seleção SporTV, SporTV News, Tá na Área and Troca de Passes are very likely to be aired live. The channel also rely on re runs of Brazilian football matches, specially at dawn.
