= SporTV =

Brazilian cable television network

- Logo used since November 2021
- Country: Brazil
- Broadcast area: Brazil; United States
- Headquarters: Rio de Janeiro

Programming
- Language: Portuguese
- Picture format: 1080i HDTV (Downgraded to 16:9 480i for SDTV sets)

Ownership
- Owner: Grupo Globo
- Parent: Canais Globo
- Sister channels: Premiere

History
- Launched: SporTV: 10 November 1991; SporTV 2: December 2003; SporTV 3: 1 October 2011
- Former names: Top Sport (1991–1994)

Links
- Webcast: globoplay.globo.com (subscription required)
- Website: ge.globo.com/sportv

Availability

Streaming media
- Sling TV (United States): Internet Protocol television
- DirecTV Stream (United States): Internet Protocol television

SporTV is a Brazilian pay television sports network owned by Canais Globo, part of Grupo Globo, launched in 1991. It is the most watched sports network in Brazil.

On 18 January 2013, were launched High-definition simulcasts of SporTV and SporTV 2. Before that, select events were broadcast in HD on sister channel Globosat HD (now Modo Viagem). In 2013, SporTV was the 3rd most watched channel on Brazilian pay television, the first among sports channels. SporTV 2 was the 19th, and SporTV 3 was the 39th most watched channel.

== History ==
The channel started broadcasting as Top Sport in 1991, broadcasting 16 hours a day, signing contracts with several sources, including ESPN. Internal surveys suggested that only a portion of ESPN's output was well-received by the Brazilian elite, including tennis, winter and water sports. The channel employed off-screen narration instead of presenters in the initial phase.

== Programs broadcast by SporTV ==
- Baú do Esporte
- Faixa Combate
- Faixa Olímpica
- Fechamento SporTV
- Giro da Rodada
- Globo Esporte Brasil
- Redação SporTV
- Seleção SporTV
- SporTV News
- Tá na Área
- Tá On
- Troca de Passes

=== Repeats of TV Globo's shows ===
- Auto Esporte
- Esporte Espetacular

== Channels ==
Channel number				Channel name	Logo	Content	Launch
SKY Brasil	Claro TV	Vivo TV	Oi	Channel name	Logo	Content	Launch
39 (SD) 439 (HD)	39 (SD) 539 (HD)	539 (HD)	39 (HD)	SporTV		Main channel SporTV, it currently broadcasts more than two thousand sporting events per year from all major sports live football game of Campeonato Brasileiro Série A.	10 November 1991
38 (SD) 438 (HD)	38 (SD) 538 (HD)	538 (HD)	38 (HD)	SporTV 2		Second channel SporTV re-airs the football events broadcast by the main channel, in addition to broadcasting simultaneous live competitions, focusing on the so-called "Other sports" (motorsports, basketball, water sports and volleyball, among others).	December 2003
37 (SD) 437 (HD)	37 (SD) 537 (HD)	537 (HD)	37 (HD)	SporTV 3		Third SporTV channel, with the aim of expanding the events and sports modalities. The third SporTV channel shows live events, in addition to re-presenting the same content as its sister channels. Its main highlights are tennis and e-sports competitions.	1 October 2011

== See also ==
- Canais Globo
- Grupo Globo
