= GNT =

Brazilian television channel

- Country: Brazil
- Network: TV Globo

Programming
- Picture format: 1080i HDTV (downgraded to 16:9 480i for the SDTV feed)

Ownership
- Owner: Canais Globo (Globo)
- Sister channels: Multishow, Globo News, SporTV, Rede Telecine

History
- Launched: 10 November 1991
- Former names: GNT: Globosat News Television

Links
- Website: gnt.globo.com

GNT is a Brazilian pay television channel. Originally launched as GNT: Globosat News Television, a news and information network. With the launch of GloboNews, in 1996, the GNT acronym became meaningless, and the channel was focused on documentaries and talk shows. In 2003, the channel was once again repositioned, with increased female-oriented programming, such as successful talk show Saia Justa. However, some original GNT programs remain, such as Manhattan Connection, currently the longest-running original program on Brazilian subscription television, though that program moved to GloboNews in January 2011.

== History ==
GNT was launched in 1991 and was a news channel until the launch of GloboNews in 1996. At launch, the channel broadcast 16 hours a day with news received from international news agencies and networks. Every morning, GNT in this phase broadcast a business news program with indices from the main stock markets. Anchormen were local professionals and at the top of each hour (similar to the later Em Cima da Hora on GloboNews) a five-minute bulletin was broadcast produced by staff from TV Globo.

== Programming ==
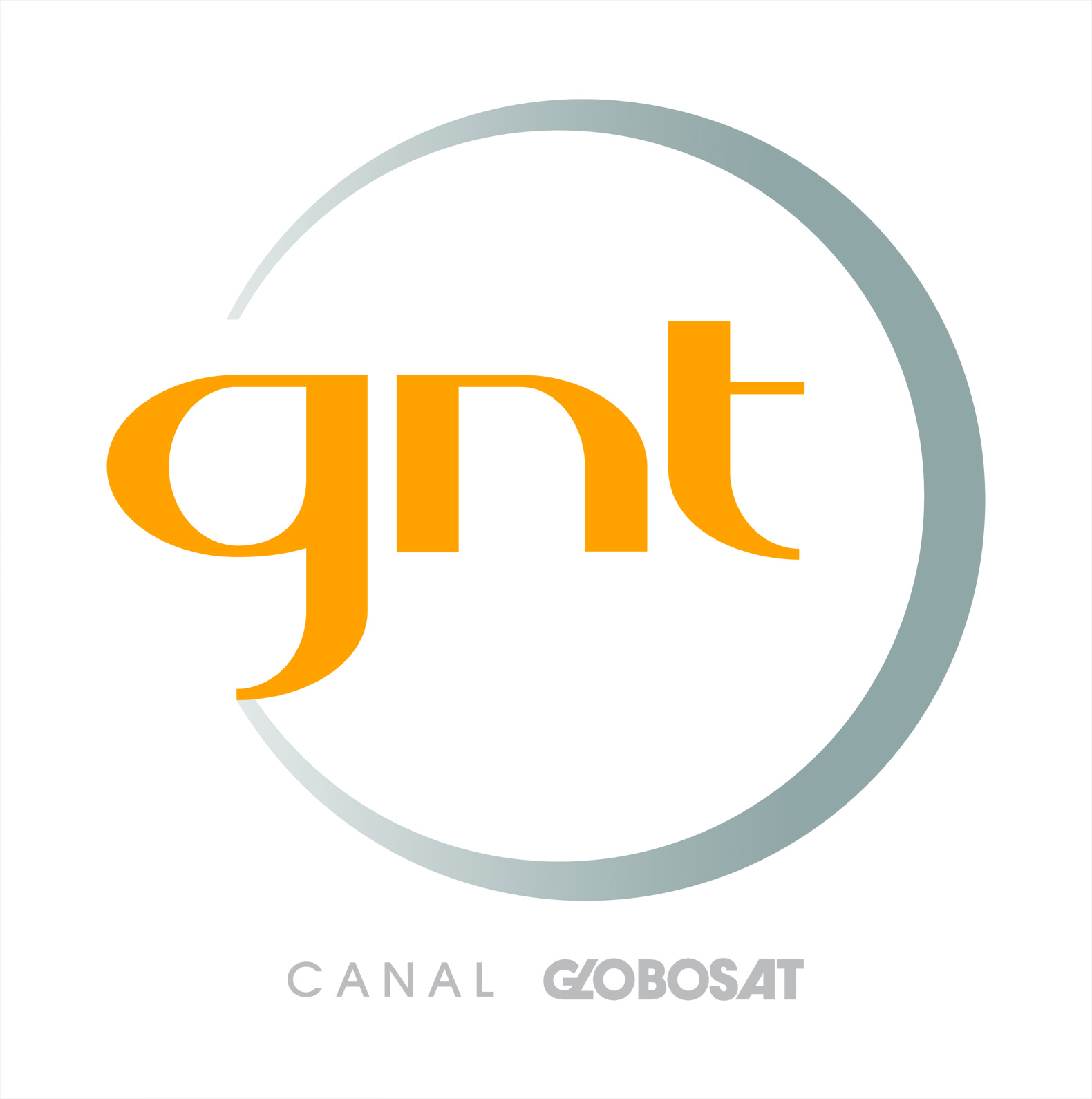
Old GNT logo used from 2003 until 2011

=== Original programming ===
- Pirei com Betty Lago
- Decora
- Diário de uma Vegana
- Alternativa: Saúde
- Chagadas e Partidas
- Base Aliada
- Vamos Combinar
- Diário do Olivier
- Food Truck - A Batalha
- GNT Fashion
- Duas Histéricas
- Descontroladas
- Marília Gabriela Entrevista
- Que Marravilha!
- Perdas e Ganhos
- Saia Justa
- Mãe & Cia.
- Conversa de Salão
- Detox do Amor
- Superbonita
- Pirei
- Santa Ajuda
- Por Um Fio
- Nos Trinques
- No Astral
- Dilemas de Irene

=== Acquired programming ===
Name of show	Original channel(s)	Original run
Programa do Jô	Globo	2000–present (simulcast
Downton Abbey	ITV (United Kingdom)	2010–present (simulcast)
Offspring	Network Ten (Australia)	2010–present (simulcast)
Refeições de Jamie Oliver em 15 Minutos	Channel 4 (United Kingdom)	2012–present (simulcast)
Receitas de Chuck	Food Network (Canada)	2008–present (simulcast)
Nigellissima	BBC Two (United Kingdom)	2012–present (simulcast)
Pão Caseiro com Paul Hollywood	BBC One (United Kingdom)	2013–present (simulcast)
Vocé é o que Você Come	Channel 4 (United Kingdom)	2004–present (simulcast)
Parenthood: Uma História de Família	NBC (United States)	2010–present (simulcast)
The Ellen DeGeneres Show	NBC O&Os; Syndication (United States)	2003–present (simulcast)
The Tonight Show Starring Jimmy Fallon	NBC (United States)	2014–present (simulcast)

==== Acquired ====
Name of show	Original channel(s)	Original run
O Chefe Espião	CBS (United States)	2010–present (simulcast)
Kitchen Nightmares	Fox (United States)	2007–present (simulcast)
Late Show with David Letterman	CBS (United States)	1993–present (simulcast)
Falando de Sexo com Sue Johanson	W Network (Canada)	1996–present (simulcast)
Paris Contra o Crime	TF1 (France)	2007–present (simulcast)
Sophie	CBC (Canada)	2008–present (simulcast)
Supernanny	NBC; ABC (United States)	2005–present (simulcasts)
Weeds	Showtime (United States)	2005–present (simulcast)
Um Turista Idiota	Sky1 (United Kingdom)	2010–present (simulcast)
FashionTelevision	City; CTV; Fashion Television (Canada)	1985–present (simulcasts)

== Slogans ==
- (2003–2006) - "Você vive este canal". (You live this channel.)
- (2006–2010) - "Você vê a diferença". (You see the difference.)
- (2010–2011) - "É pra você". (It's for you.)
- (2011–2015) - "Com você". (With you.)
- (2015–present) - "Para todos os gostos, um único GNT." (For every taste, only one GNT.) / "Para todos os estilos, um único GNT." (For every style, only one GNT.) / "Para todas as emoções, um único GNT." (For every mood, only one GNT.) / "Para todos os momentos, um único GNT." (For every moment, only one GNT.)
