= GloboNews =

- Country: Brazil
- Broadcast area: Worldwide
- Headquarters: Rio de Janeiro, Brazil

Programming
- Language: Portuguese (PT-BR)
- Picture format: HDTV 1080i (downscaled to 480i for the SD feed)

Ownership
- Owner: Canais Globo (Globo)

History
- Launched: 15 October 1996

Links
- Webcast: g1.globo.com globoplay.globo.com (subscription required)
- Website: g1.globo.com/globo-news/

GloboNews is a Brazilian news-based pay television channel, owned by Canais Globo, a division of Globo.

== History ==
GloboNews launched in 1996. In the previous year, Alice-Maria Reiniger had been invited to return to Sky Brasil, where she had started her career in journalism, to deploy and direct Brazil's first 24-hour news channel. She created and helmed GloboNews for the next decade.

On 27 August 2002, Globo News on Sky Brasil became the first news channel in Latin America to include interactive functions, with data from the channel's website. The interactive service was also used for the 2002 elections.
