= Cocoricó =

Brazilian children's TV puppet show

- Logo utilized for merchandising.
- Genre: Children's television series; Educational television; Comedy
- Created by: Arcângelo Mello e Eliana Lobo (1996-2000) Fernando Gomes (2003-2013)
- Directed by: Arcângelo Mello and Eliana Lobo (1996-2000); Fernando Gomes (2003-2013)
- Starring: Álvaro Petersen Jr.; Eduardo Alves; Enrique Serrano; Falcon Montovanni; Fernando Gomes; Hugo Picchi; Kelly Guidotti; Léo Abel; Magda Crudelli; Neusa de Souza
- Theme music composer: Hélio Ziskind
- Opening theme: "Cocoricó" (1996), performed by Hélio Ziskind; "Nós" (2003-13), performed by Hélio Ziskind, Tarsila Amorim and Tatiana Parra
- Ending theme: "Cocoricó (Encerramento)", performed by Hélio Ziskind
- Composers: Hélio Ziskind (1996-2008); Zé Rodrix (2006-08); Fernando Salem (2010-11)
- Country of origin: Brazil
- Original language: Portuguese
- No. of seasons: 10
- No. of episodes: 326 (+17 musical clips, +26 financial education episodes)

Production
- Running time: 25-27 minutes (1996-2000) 11-13 minutes (2003-2013) 3-7 minutes (2024-2025)
- Production company: TV Cultura

Original release
- Network: TV Cultura TV Rá Tim Bum (2004 - present) ViVe (Venezuela) Paka Paka (Argentina)
- Release: 1 April 1996 – 28 December 2013

Cocoricó is a Brazilian children's puppet television series on TV Cultura that premiered on April 10, 1996. The character Júlio was originally derived from a Christmas special that aired in 1989 called "Banho de Aventura" (Adventure Bath) on the program Rá-Tim-Bum. When Cocoricó debuted in the 90s, the program had a similar format to Glub Glub featuring short European animated series like Pingu and Fireman Sam interspersed with simple stories featuring the puppet characters, however some special episodes debuting new characters were made. The production of the show was done until 2001, when the production team started to work in Ilha Rá-Tim-Bum. With that Cocoricó had some reruns until 2003 received a soft reboot featuring new stories and without the cartoons.

== Development and Production ==
On June 12, 1995, Jorge da Cunha Lima, who at that time had assumed the presidency of Fundação Padre Anchieta, had an idea for a new children's production for the channel made in partnership with SESI that would be a crossover between Rá-Tim-Bum and Castelo Rá-Tim-Bum called "Fazenda Rá-Tim-Bum" that would be set on a farm, but the idea was discarded in the same year due to a financial crisis on the channel that canceled several children's shows projects, and being later revived in 1997 later becoming Ilha Rá-Tim-Bum in 1998.

The project was then reformulated in a cheaper format similar to the already established Glub Glub, showing simple stories interspersed with short cartoons, reusing the character Júlio from the 1989 TV special "Banho de Aventura", with puppets made by Renato Criaturas. According to Bia Rosenberg there were plans for the show to make use of animatronics for the chickens, but with reduced costs for normal puppets made created by Fernando Gomes.

In the first episode released in 1996, Júlio presents a television given by his grandfather so that his friends in the barn could watch cartoons, and Júlio is initially accompanied only by Alípio, Lola, Lilica, Zazá, Mimosa and Kiko, with the episodes focusing mostly on dialogues between the characters while they occasionally took breaks to watch the cartoons that aired on the television installed in the barn. However, over time, new characters were gradually introduced and the stories became more elaborate, focusing more on the puppet characters and less on the cartoons.

The series received a revamp in 2003 under the direction of Fernando Gomes, with better stories, bigger scenarios, new puppets and characters and without the presence of cartoons. In 2007 the series got new characters with the emphasis on João, the Júlio's city cousin who became one of the new protagonists.

In 2010 the show received a new reformulation, starting to show stories focused on an urban setting with Júlio and his friends going to spend their holidays in the apartment where João lives, also featuring new characters. The first episodes of this season premiered theatrically with a compilation of the first 5 episodes.

On July 9, 2012, another reformulation took place called TV Cocoricó, starting to present live episodes focusing on interviews with guests and sketches. Cocoricó had its end decreed in 2013, when the contract with the production team ended and the broadcaster decided to invest in other projects.

== Story ==
The series revolves around the daily life of an eight-year-old boy named Júlio who lives with his grandparents on a farm known as Cocoricó located in a town in the interior of São Paulo known as Cocoricolândia. On this farm, Júlio's best friends are the animals, who talk to him and play with him, like the trio of chickens Lola, Lilica and Zazá, the horse Alípio, the parrots Kiko and Caco, the cow Mimosa or the baby pig Astolfo, and by extension some other friends who don't live in the farm like the indigenous girl Oriba and the bat Toquinho. Each episode revolves around something from the daily life of Júlio or some other resident of the farm, covering everyday themes, occasionally demonstrating an educational side about things ranging from simple things like folklore, cultures, cuisine, learning to be patient to topics like losing a friend, bullying, overcoming fears... In some episodes, Júlio and his friends are also tormented by Dito and Feito, a pair of troublemaking animals who love to make pranks with the farm residents.

Later the show has undergone changes with the addition of new characters such as Júlio's cousin from the city João in the main cast, the duck couple Torquato and Patavina becoming the new antagonists alongside Dito and Feito, in addition to the characters moving to the city setting to the apartment where João and his family live in the final seasons.

== Events ==
In 2012 the puppet show was performed live in the Camillo de Jesus Lima Culture Center.

Heavy metal performer Andreas Kisser appeared as part of the April 15, 2013 episode.

== Characters ==
=== Main characters ===
- Júlio, it's the main character. An 8-year-old boy who lives on a farm with his grandparents and has the farm animals as his best friends. His parents were never featured on the show.
- Lola, a yellow chicken who wears a pink hat. She is Zazá's best friend from childhood and usually acts as the leader of the trio. Unlike her friend, she is shown to be more tolerable with children, as well as having a vast knowledge of her travels when she was young that she often shares with her friends. In the first few episodes she was referred to as Aurora.
- Zazá, a red chicken who wears glasses. She is the eldest of the trio of chickens and is Lola's best friend. She is characterized by her short temper, sometimes even acting grumpy. In the first few episodes she was referred to as Isaura.
- Lilica, a red chicken who wears a blue bow. She is the youngest of the trio being a 6 year old who is usually taken care of by Lola and Zazá. She is characterized by being a impatient and sometimes stubborn child and often ends up annoying her friends, especially Zazá, for her immature behavior. Even so, she proves to be a great friend to Júlio, Caco and Alípio. She is seen traveling to the city that João lives in for the last few seasons. In the first few episodes she was referred to as Doralice.
- Kiko, an adult parrot that is Caco's uncle. He is a sailor who has already traveled the seas knowing many places, because of this he tends to show himself as a know-it-all claiming to have a lot of knowledge. The character was only present in the early years having been removed in the 2003 soft reboot for unknown reasons, although he was mentioned by Caco in one episode claiming that his uncle returned to traveling.
- Alípio, the horse that works on the farm. He has a caipira accent and when not working he is seen playing with the children. He can be considered Júlio's best friend on the farm (until the introduction of João), since he is always close to Júlio even to talk to him at night in his room before he goes to sleep. He is also characterized by being a big eater and loves to eat corn and other foods made by Júlio's grandmother.
- Mimosa, a jolly blue cow. Her main function on the farm is to provide milk for Júlio's grandparents and she proves to be a good friend of Lola and Zazá. She was a very recurring character in the early years, but over time her appearances in the episodes were reduced becoming a minor character.
- Caco, Kiko's nephew. He is a parrot kid who is the same age as Lilica and is considered her best friend. Similar to Lilica he is also characterized as an impatient child, sometimes being arrogant and talkative, which also annoys his friends sometimes. He was introduced in the first year of the show, having been introduced as a city parrot who moved to the farm to live with his uncle.
- Oriba, an indigenous Brazilian girl. She lives in a unseen tribe near the Cocoricó farm and often visits her friends. She is the same age as Júlio and even studies with him at the same school. Usually she is seen bickering with Júlio, but deep down the two show that they care a lot about each other, an example of this is in the seasons focused on the city where Oriba shows jealousy that Júlio has fallen in love with Vitória. Just like Júlio, her parents were never featured on the show. She made her first appearance in the special episode "A Indiazinha" from 1996 and her appearances became more frequent after 2003.
- Toquinho, a pessimistic bat who is a friend of the residents of the Cocoricó farm. Like Oriba he lives outside the farm and is often seen visiting his friends at the farm. He is characterized by his cowardly and pessimistic behavior, often thinking that things are going to go wrong, which sometimes annoys his friends. His appearances become more frequent in the late 2000s where he is often seen as Lilica and Caco's friend. Just like Caco and Oriba he was introduced throughout the early episodes.
- Dito and Feito, two characters who normally act as antagonists. They were introduced throughout the early episodes. They are two animals (of unspecified species) who normally like to play pranks on the farm's residents for fun. Feito is the smallest of the duo (resembling a mole) and the leader and Dito is the biggest (resembling a monkey) and follows the stereotype of a dumb henchman. A running gag involving them is that usually Dito is the one with the good ideas, but Feito always makes Dito believe that the ideas are his and not from Dito. Dito is rarely referred to by his name, being most often called "bobalhão" (something like "goofball") by Feito. In last seasons they have come to act as accomplices for Torquato. Their real names are Benedito and Feitosa.
- Júlio's grandparents, are the owners of the Cocoricó farm and responsible for the care of Júlio. They were introduced in the 2003 soft reboot, since previously they were unseen characters. The grandfather works as a farmer while the grandmother works as a confectioner and later also as a teacher at Júlio's school. Their names are never mentioned in the series, since they are often referred to as Vó ("Grandma") and Vô (Grandpa) by all the characters.
- Astolfo, a baby pig that was introduced in the 2003 soft reboot. He lives in a pigsty with his mother usually being seen inside his crib most of the time. He is a spoiled and naive child, often needs the help of his mother (or some other resident from the farm) to learn something new. Although being a baby he is able to speak perfectly. His mother is never seen appearing inside the screen, except for her hands.
- Pato Torquato, a mischievous adult duck which normally acts as an antagonist. He had a few appearances in a few episodes of the 2003 soft reboot, until he became a regular character in the late 2000s as the main antagonist along with his wife Patavina. He normally loves to play pranks on the residents of the Cocoricó farm, often using Dito and Feito as his accomplices. He is characterized by his arrogance and also often speaks with an excess of "Qs".
- João, Júlio's city cousin. He is an African-Brazilian boy that was introduced in the late 2000s seasons to become a regular main character. In his first appearances he was characterized by being a boy influenced by hip hop culture often speaking slangs in addition to having been responsible for introducing technology to the farm including giving a laptop to Júlio. In his first appearances, João also showed an interest in scientific studies, a characteristic that was dropped throughout the episodes. Since his introduction he has been seen to be portrayed as Júlio' best friend something that continues into the city-focused seasons.
- Patavina, Torquato's wife, with whom he shares many of the traits such as arrogance and narcissism. She was introduced in the late 2000s, as well as Torquato serving as one of the show's main antagonists and normally giving orders in Dito and Feito. Like her husband, she likes to play pranks on the residents of the Cocoricó farm, usually Lola, Lilica and Zazá. She is also often seen working in the kitchen and showing off with it. She also often speaks with an excess of "Qs".
- Martelo, a frog kid that lives in a river next to Torquato and Patavina's house. Just like João and Patavina he was introduced in the late 2000s seasons. He is very friends with the residents from Cocoricó farm, unlike Torquato and Patavina. Unlike the other frogs, he prefers to eat candy instead of insects, including having a fly named Zac Zac as his best friend. João shows to be afraid of him due to his batrachophobia.

=== Introduced in the city episodes ===
- Dora and Noel, João and Rodolfo's parents. Dora is the mother being daughter of Júlio' grandparents (and possibly the sister of one of Júlio's parents) while Noel is the father, notably having dark skin which was inherited by his children. Noel originally appeared in a Christmas special preceding the city-focused episodes.
- Rodolfo, João's baby brother. Just like Astolfo he is also able to speak perfectly despite being a baby.
- Vitória, a girl who is friends with Júlio and João in the city. Júlio demonstrates a platonic love for Vitória, though he never reveals this to her. Oriba is shown to be jealous of her.
- Roto and Esfarrapado, a duo of animals that live in the alley next to the building where João lives. They have similar behavior to Dito and Feito, although they are not antagonistic. Roto is a grumpy adult rat that usually dislike kids and is easily annoyed by Esfarrapado, that is a young hyperactive dog that is pretty naive in addition to being more friendly with the residents of João's apartment. At the beginning of each episode the two are often seen interacting with each other as they wait for the street light to open.
- Dorivaldo, the doorman at the hotel where João lives. He's always working on the ground floor and sometimes he's listening to the radio. He comes from a family where everyone is a doorman and is called Dorivaldo (even having the same physical appearance).

=== Others ===
- Vaqueiro Leonardo, an unseen vaqueiro who works on the farm, usually with Alípio. He is mentioned several times by the characters, but has never physically appeared in any episode.
- Galileu, a rooster who works as a singer and previously lived on the Cocoricó farm. He was childhood friends with Lola, Zazá and Kiko, including having shown rivalry with Kiko in childhood to see who would go to see more places in the world on trips when they grew up. He appeared as the focus of one of the first specials of the 90's returning to the farm and making peace with Kiko.
- Mindinho, Júlio's pet dog. Unlike the other farm animals, he doesn't speak and acts like a normal animal. He had few appearances in the first few episodes of the 2003 soft reboot until he died in one of the episodes hit by a truck.
- Zac Zac, Martelo's best friend. A female fly who usually helps him get free food at Torquato and Patavina's house. Martelo is the only one who can talk and understand her. Unlike the other characters, she is animated in CGI instead of being a puppet.
- Midori, a boy of Japanese descent who appears in the final season TV Cocoricó.

== Puppeteers ==
Actor	Character(s)
Fernando Gomes	Julio, Vô (Grandpa), Roto, Rodolfo
Eduardo Alves	Lola, João (John), Pato Torquato (Torquato Duck)
Hugo Picchi	Alípio, Astolfo, Kiko
Alvaro Petersen Jr.	Oriba, Dito, Vó, Esfarrapado
Enrique Serrano	Toquinho, Feito, Sapo Martelo (Martelo Toad)
Neusa de Souza	Zazá, Caco
Magda Crudelli	Lilica, Mimosa, Patavina
Falcon Mantovanni	Dorivaldo, Vitória

== Media ==
=== DVDs ===
After the program was reformulated in 2003 some DVDs were sold, some of them with episodes and others having just the music videos contained in the episodes. By 2005, these DVDs (especially those containing music videos) had sold more than 216 thousand copies, reaching the top of the list of best-selling television series DVDs in Brazil, surpassing other series such as SpongeBob SquarePants and Friends.

=== Books ===
On March 19, 2006, a book entitled "Cocoricó - O Livro" was launched at the São Paulo Book Biennial showing stories adapted from the episodes. Other books were published in later years.

=== Comics ===
In 2007, Cocoricó was adapted into a comic book series published by Editora Globo, after Globo signed a contract with Cultura Marcas looking to use new brands for comics, after Mauricio de Sousa ended his contract in the same year moving Monica's Gang to Panini Comics. The comic was canceled in 2008 after 8 issues when it was decreed the end of comic book publications on Globo.

Another comic book with photo comics of the episodes was published in 2012 by Deomar lasting only 4 issues.

=== Mobile game ===
In 2014, an endless runner mobile game titled "Cocoricó: Brincando de Pega-Pega" was released for smartphone devices. In the game it was possible to play with Júlio, Alípio, Lilica, Astolfo and João and the gameplay consisted of a game of tag with one of the characters chasing the player. The game is currently no longer available for download.

== Reception ==
During its premiere in 1996, Cocoricó was accused of plagiarism by cartoonist Ely Barbosa who alleged that TV Cultura copied one of his projects for a children's show entitled "Celeiro Encantado" which was originally created in 1990 for Rede Manchete, but was never produced.

After the debut of the new version in 2003, the series became more popular and known among the public, according to Fernando Gomes in an interview, the program managed not only to attract attention from children, but also from adult audiences, in addition to being considered one of the best puppet shows in the world, being recognized at international festivals. The success of DVD sales encouraged TV Cultura to profit from several other products using the Cocoricó brand during the 2000s, according to some parents on internet some children up to 4 years old were having the word "Cocó" as their first word. In 2003 Cocoricó was awarded in Chile at the Festival Prix Jeunesse Iberoamericano in the category of best preschool series. In 2004, the show was awarded best TV series at a children's festival Festival de Cine Infantil de Ciudad Guyana in Venezuela.

In the late 2010s, Júlio became an internet meme, being the target of comparisons with singer Ed Sheeran, especially based on the music videos Sing and Happier, which feature Sheeran as a puppet caricature. This led the character to speak out about it to the public, denying the meme saying he was not Ed Sheeran on his YouTube channel.
