= Newbie and the Disasternauts =

- Also known as: Nilba e os Desastronautas
- Genre: Comedy, Science fiction, Parody
- Created by: Ale McHaddo
- Country of origin: Brazil
- Original language: Portuguese
- No. of seasons: 3
- No. of episodes: 39

Production
- Running time: 7 minutes
- Production companies: 44Toons; Padre Anchieta Foundation

Original release
- Network: TV Rá-Tim-Bum (Brazil); Starz Kids & Family (US)
- Release: 2010 – 2012

Newbie and the Disasternauts (Portuguese: Nilba e os Desastronautas) is a Brazilian animated television series created by Ale McHaddo. It was produced by 44Toons in association with the Padre Anchieta Foundation which aired on its children's channel TV Rá-Tim-Bum in 2010, after being aired on other channels as the Gloob, TV Cultura and TV Brasil. The cartoon has big influence of American cartoons like Cartoon Network and Nicktoons-style with frequent parodies other series in general. In the United States, it is currently shown on Starz Kids and Family since April 2013.

The series remained in production until 2012. From 2013 its creator began to focus on another animated comedy series, Osmar: The Heel of the Loaf.

== Plot ==
Newton "Newbie" Biewsky real name Natasak is an impatient kid who takes it all jokingly and won't stop talking all the time especially in his classroom. In one of those games he buys a stellar trip through a travel organization with rockets entitled to his own crew with her cousin Laika and her monkey friend Albert on the ship SS Geniwald. But in a failed attempt to command the spacecraft finding team captain he ends up in an unknown satellite called Pea Moon where they are getting stuck since then looking for a way to return home.

== Characters ==
- Newbie - A playful and narcissistic boy who became captain of a starship crew Geniwald after their ship landed in the strange Pea Moon.
- Albert - An anthropomorphic monkey and Newbie's guardian, gets him responsible for the various problems that it creates on the Pea Moon. He is very serious and sarcastic, and constantly cites references to TV shows.
- Laika - Nilba's cousin. She is a pre-teen girl who shows a lot of maturity unlike his cousin and sometimes comes to help him out of his trouble on the Pea Moon like Albert.
- Mrs. Hilda - S.S. Genivald's cook. She is responsible for making the crew's food, making several strange dishes with the food found by Moon Pea, but even so the crew demonstrates that they eat normally. As revealed in the episode "Where We Come From", she was a maid for E.I.T.A., the organization that financed the crew's trip before making the crew. She is also the oldest of the crew and has Princess Leia hairstyle from the Star Wars series.
- Dr. Roger - A scientist at S.S. Genivald. He is responsible for studying all the phenomena of Moon Pea and making inventions to help the crew. He has a very calm personality. As revealed in the episode Where We Come From he worked at E.I.T.A. before joining the crew. He is always working in his laboratory rarely appearing outside the ship.
- Mr. Zabarowsk "Zaba" - A mechanic of S.S. Genivald. He is responsible for monitoring the ship's equipment. He has a very calm and slow personality just like Roger. As revealed in the episode From Where We Come, he took care of the maintenance of the E.I.T.A. before being part of the schedule. His best friend is the Contralt robot he constantly fixes. He is rarely seen off the ship or on missions.
- Contralt Del Valle - A red robot from S.S. Genivald. It is not known what his role in the crew is, although he usually serves as a microphone for Nilba when he meets with the entire crew. As seen in the episode "Collect All", he is a robot full of failures that is always crashing, although this is not shown in the other episodes. As revealed in the episode "Where We Come From", he was an E.I.T.A. who ended up becoming a robot by joining the crew of the S.S. Genivald along with the others.
- Mr. Dawsons - member of S.S. Genivald. He is responsible for the safety of the crew, although this is never shown in the drawing. Like the other members of the team, he worked at E.I.T.A. before joining the crew. As shown in the episode Collect All, Newbie admires him and tries to be an adventurer and fighter like him although he has never been seen fighting.
- Zurduki - The main antagonist of the show. He's an alien moon Pea that lies grand and lives trying to break into the ship Geniwald thinking they keep a secret that will help you master the universe, and always failing lives. Is always accompanied by his stupid sidekick Yurkut.
- Yurkut - Zurduki's bumbling helper. He is always helping his master in his plans although he proves not to be intelligent besides having a very small brain as shown in the episode Get Inside. He is a skinny green alien, with no nose and ears, slanted eyes and a crooked body. In the episode Christmas on the Pea Moon it is revealed that he is actually a Zurduki clone who was supposed to be a little less smart than him, but it turned out wrong.
