= Anna Muylaert =

Brazilian filmmaker (born 1964)

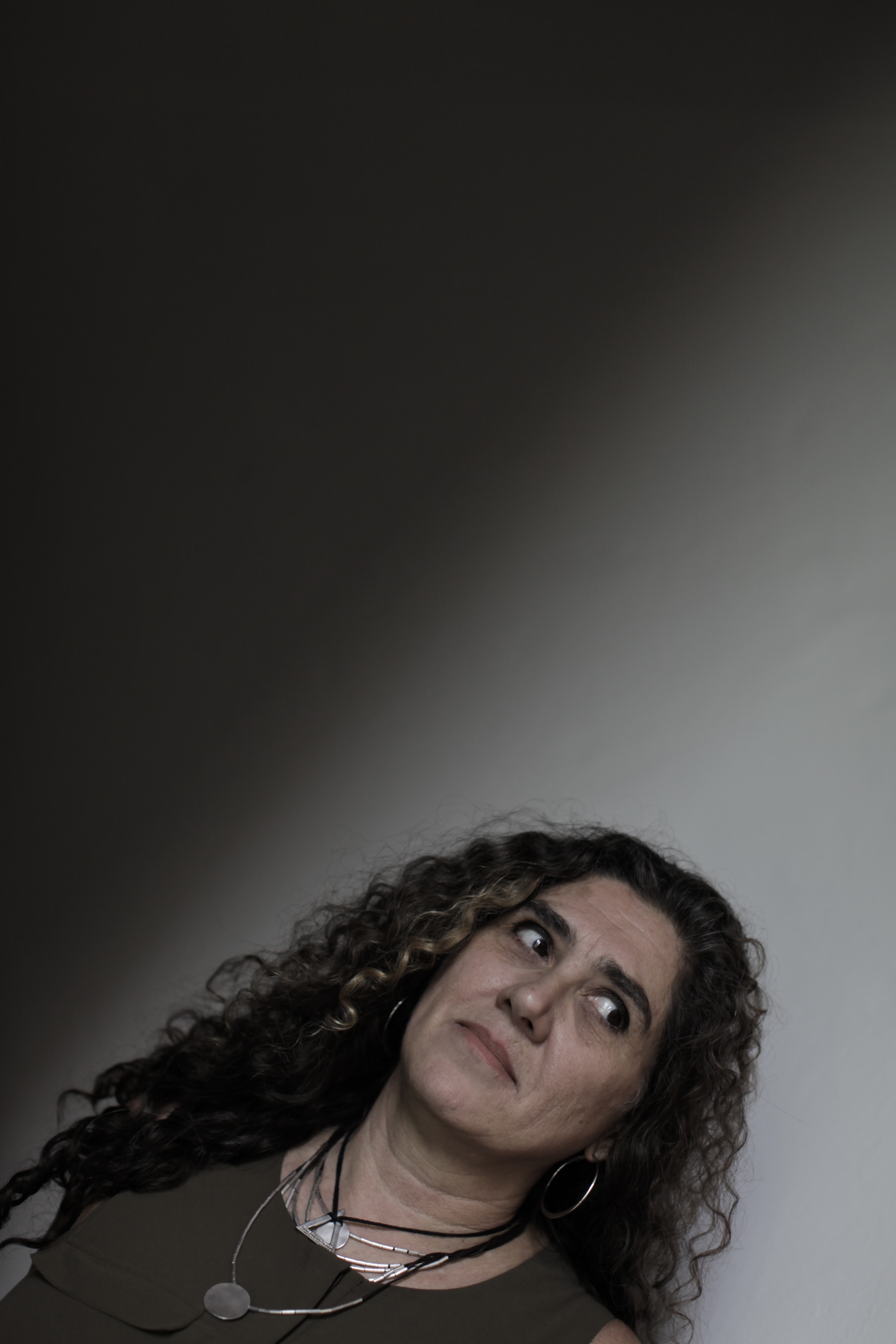
- Muylaert in 2016
- Born: 21 April 1964 (age 62); São Paulo, Brazil
- Education: University of São Paulo
- Occupations: Screenwriter, director, producer
- Years active: 1979–present
- Spouse: André Abujamra (divorced)
- Children: 2

Ana Luiza Machado da Silva Muylaert (born 21 April 1964), known professionally as Anna Muylaert, is a Brazilian film and television director, producer and screenwriter.

== Education and early career ==
Anna studied filmmaking at the School of Communications and Arts at University of São Paulo (USP) from 1980 to 1984. She became a film critic for IstoÉ and O Estado de S. Paulo and in 1988 she joined the staff of Rede Gazeta's program TV Mix. In 1999, she worked as an editor and reporter on TV Cultura's Matéria-Prima. She also wrote scripts for the Cultura programs Mundo da Lua (1991–92) and Castelo Rá-Tim-Bum (1994–97).

== Directing career ==
Muylaert has directed six short films which won awards at Rio Cine e Cine Ceará—before directing her first feature film, Durval Discos (2002). It won seven awards out of fourteen nominations at Festival de Gramado, including Best Director and Best Film. Seven years later, she released her second film, É Proibido Fumar, which won eight awards at Festival de Brasília, including Best Screenplay and Best Film. Muylaert directed Chamada a Cobrar (2012), based on a television film Para Aceitá-la Continue na Linha (2010), which she also directed. Her fourth film, The Second Mother, entered the 2015 Sundance Film Festival and Panorama at Berlinale film festival, where the film received the Audience Award.

Mulaert's 2016 film Don't Call Me Son premiered at the 66th Berlin International Film Festival.

== Filmography ==
Key
†	Indicates a documentary	‡	Indicates a short film

List of films directed by Anna Muylaert
Year	Original title	English release title	Language(s)	Notes
1979	Kikos Marinhos ^{‡}		Portuguese	Co-directed with Márcio Ferrari.
1983	Hot Dog ^{‡}		Portuguese	Co-directed with Márcio Ferrari.
1984	Paixão XX ^{‡}		Portuguese	
1988	Rock Paulista ^{†}		Portuguese	Short documentary on contemporary rock bands of São Paulo.
1992	As Rosas Não Calam ^{‡}		Portuguese	
1994-1995	Castelo Rá-Tim-Bum		Portuguese	TV series. Segment director for 11 episodes.
1995	A Origem dos Bebês Segundo Kiki Cavalcanti ^{‡}		Portuguese	
2002	Durval Discos	Durval Discos / Durval Records	Portuguese	
2006	Um Menino Muito Maluquinho		Portuguese	TV series. Co-created with Cao Hamburger. Writer for all 26 episodes.
2009	É Proibido Fumar	Smoke Gets in Your Eyes	Portuguese	
2012	Arco-Íris ^{‡}	Rainbow	Portuguese	Episode of TV series Preamar.
2012	Chamada a Cobrar	Chamada a Cobrar	Portuguese	
2013	As Canalhas		Portuguese	TV series. Director of episodes "Carolina" and "Amélia".
2013	E Além de Tudo Me Deixou Mudo o Violão	While My Guitar Gently Weeps	Portuguese	TV film
2015	Que Horas Ela Volta?	The Second Mother	Portuguese	
2016	Mãe Só Há Uma	Don't Call Me Son	Portuguese	
2025	A melhor mãe do mundo	The Best Mother in the World	Portuguese	It was screened in Berlinale Special at the 75th Berlin International Film Festival in February 2025.
TBA	Jéssicas ^{†}		Portuguese	
