= Daphne Bozaski =

Brazilian actress and dancer

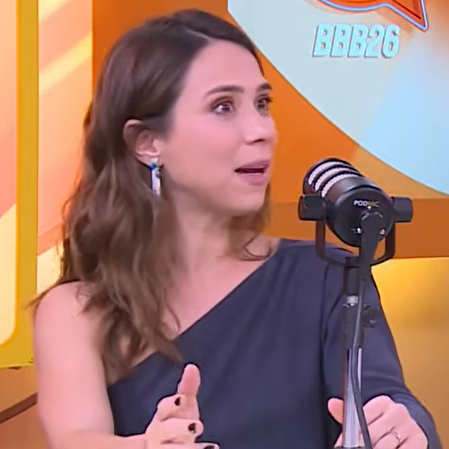
- Bozaski on the BBB Mesacast in 2026
- Born: Daphne Bozaski; August 14, 1992 (age 34); São Paulo, SP, Brazil
- Citizenship: Brazil
- Education: Universidade Federal do Paraná
- Occupations: actress dancer
- Years active: 2004–present
- Website: daphnebozaski.wordpress.com

Daphne Bozaski (August 14, 1992) is a Brazilian actress and dancer. She is known for playing the character Lali Monstra in the children’s series Que Monstro te Mordeu? and for her role as Benê in Malhação: Viva a Diferença where she was one of the lead characters. She starred in the series As Five, created and directed by Cao Hamburguer and available on Globoplay.

== Biography ==
=== First years and education ===
Daphne was born in the city of São Paulo in 1992. She began her artistic training in classical ballet. She moved to Curitiba, the capital of the state of Paraná, to study contemporary dance at the Federal University of Paraná (UFPR).

=== Career ===
Her acting career began in 2004 in professional theater in the city of Curitiba. In 2012, she performed with the Centro de Pesquisa Teatral (CPT) theater company in the play Toda Nudez Será Castigada (All Nudity Shall Be Punished), written by Nelson Rodrigues and directed by Antunes Filho.

In 2013, the actress began her career in television and film when she starred in the children’s series Que Monstro te Mordeu?, which aired on TV Cultura. The following year, he worked on cable television productions for networks such as GNT and Cartoon Network.

In 2017, she starred in her first soap opera on Rede Globo, playing Benê, a character with autism, in the Viva a Diferença season of the series Malhação. In 2020, she reprised her role as Benê in the series As Five, a spin-off of Malhação aired by Globoplay. The story followed the characters’ lives six years after they graduated from high school, as they faced the challenges of adulthood. The series ran for four seasons. She then played the Guatemalan character Lupita de La Cruz in the telenovela Família é Tudo, which premiered on March 4 of that same year. In 2025, she joined the cast of Três Graças, a soap opera by Aguinaldo Silva, where she played the imposter Lucélia, the niece of Kasper Damatta, portrayed by Miguel Falabella. That same year, she joined the cast of Loquinha, a spin-off of the soap opera Três Graças in the form of a web series distributed by Globoplay.

=== Personal life ===
The actress is the daughter of actress Ivete Bozaki and has Polish ancestry. She has been married to chef Gustavo Araújo since 2018, and they had a son on December 24 of that year, named Caetano. The couple lives in the Vila Mariana neighborhood of São Paulo.

== Filmography ==
Year	Title	Character	Note(s)	Ref.
2014	Pedro & Bianca	Ritinha	Episode: "Bombado"	
2014	Que Monstro te Mordeu?	Lali Monstra		
2014	Experimentos Extraordinários	Camila		
2016	Lili, a Ex	Bruninha		
2017	Manual para se Defender de Aliens, Ninjas e Zumbis	Tina		
2017–2018	Malhação: Viva a Diferença	Benedita Teixeira Ramos (Benê)	Season 25	
2019	Ilha de Ferro	Maria Eduarda Giordano	Season 2	
2020–2024	As Five	Benedita Teixeira Ramos (Benê)		
2021–2022	Nos Tempos do Imperador	Maria Dolores Cavalcanti Mendes (Dolores)		
2024	Família é Tudo	Lupita Maria Del Rosario Sanchez Perez de La Cruz Mancini		
2025–2026	Três Graças	Lucélia Damatta (Lucy)		

=== Film ===
Year	Title	Character	Note(s)	Ref.
2017	Gosto Se Discute	Kelly		

=== Internet ===
Year	Title	Character	Note(s)	Ref.
2026	Loquinha	Lucélia Damatta (Lucy)		
