= Anabel (Brazilian TV series) =

- Genre: Animated series Comedy; Fantasy
- Created by: Lancast Mota
- Directed by: Lancast Mota; Denise Ehlers
- Voices of: Adriana Gimenez; Adriane Azevedo; Carlos Badia; Gabriela Paparelli
- Opening theme: Sou a Anabel (season 2)
- Ending theme: Instrumental
- Composer: Carlos Badia
- Country of origin: Brazil
- Original language: Portuguese
- No. of seasons: 2
- No. of episodes: 26

Production
- Executive producer: Sérgio Martinelli
- Running time: 7 minutes (season 1); 10 minutes (season 2)
- Production companies: Martinelli Films; Estúdio Gato Amarelo

Original release
- Network: Nickelodeon Brazil (season 1); TV Rá-Tim-Bum (season 2)
- Release: February 26, 2005 – 2011

Anabel is a Brazilian animated television series created by Lancast Mota and produced by Sergio Martinelli. It was the first Brazilian animated series on Nickelodeon Brazil, starting with a series of animated shorts that aired during commercial breaks in 2004, until the full series debuted on February 26, 2005, on the TV show Patrulha Nick. From the following year onwards the show was moved to TV Rá-Tim-Bum, where the second season premiered on February 5, 2011. The show also aired on TVE and its successor TV Brasil.

A comic strip adaptation also ran in the children's magazine Recreio between 2008 and 2011.

== Premise ==
Set in the 1930s, the show revolves on a girl named Anabel, who lives with her unnamed parents in the city of Porto Alegre. She goes to school by riding the city's tramcars. Anabel also travels to fantastical and supernatural adventures from literary novels, encountering monsters and creatures. She also solves mysteries and stops dangers in the city.

In the second season the show went through big changes, moving the character into modern times and focusing more on slice-of-life stories and less on monsters and supernatural adventures, as well as introducing the character Ulisses as Anabel's best friend.

== Characters ==
- Anabel – The 7-year-old protagonist of the show. She enjoys listening to radio dramas and reading fiction books from many authors including Edgar Allan Poe. He often ends up going on adventures, most of the time encountering supernatural things. She's named after the titular figure in Poe's poem "Annabel Lee, while her appearance bears resemblance with Wednesday Addams.
- Anabel's parents – The protagonist's unnamed parents. The father is a pharmacist (cook in season 2) and the mother is a history teacher. Originally in the first episode of the series, "O Cachorro Escritor", both had similar appearances to Gomez and Morticia Addams, but their designs were changed throughout the rest of the series.
- Inspetor Carangueijo (Inspector Crab) – A detective based in Porto Alegre. He is somewhat incompetent at his job and relies on Anabel's help to solve criminal cases. He only appeared in the episodes "O Cachorro Escritor" and "O Homem Fornalha" in the season 1 and "Rapto de Natal" in the season 2.
- Ulisses – Anabel's best friend, who is overweight and is introduced in the season 2. He is a boy who is constantly getting into trouble, usually unintentionally. His appearance is similar to Pugsley Addams.
- Théo - A magical crow and friend of Anabel and Ulisses that can only be seen by them. He is able to create gates to other worlds. Like Ulysses, he only appears in season 2.

== Production ==
Lancast Mota devised and developed the concept of Anabel in the 1990s. He picked the 1930s as the time setting of the series due to its distinctive popular culture field placed apart from electronic-driven media of the present day, which includes television and video games. Mota and his team wanted the show to take advantage of creative elements not widely utilized in other animated works, including but not limited to strong literary themes and violence. Mota also avoided cliches seen in such other animated works, such as a "villain who wants to take over the world." The team made the protagonist motivated by non-visual media such as books and radio, which was prevalent in the 1930s.

The show was financed by the Rouanet Law and TV Cultura in 2000.
