= Ana Hikari =

Brazilian actress

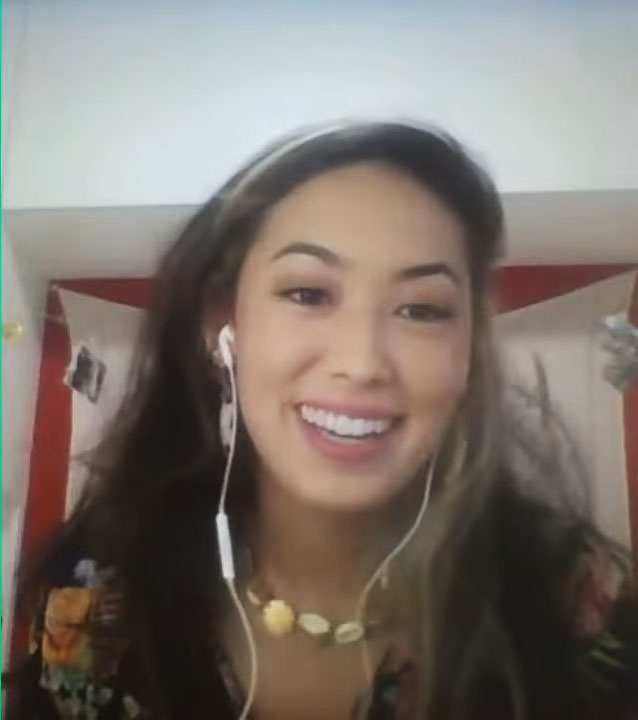
- Hikari in 2021
- Born: Ana Hikari Takenaka Rosa; 21 December 1994 (age 31); São Paulo, Brazil
- Occupation: Actress
- Years active: 2006–present

Ana Hikari Takenaka Rosa (born 21 December 1994) is a Brazilian actress. She became the first actress of Asian descent to star in a telenovela produced by Rede Globo, when she appeared in Malhação: Viva a Diferença, and a first such instance since Yoshico, um Poema de Amor broadcast by Rede Tupi in 1967.

== Early and personal life ==
Ana Hikari Takenaka Rosa was born on 21 December 1994 in São Paulo to professor Almir Antônio Rosa, known as Almir Almas, and dentist Makiko Takenaka. In 2021, the actress revealed on Instagram that she had taken a genetic ancestry test through the company Genera, which confirmed her mixed heritage. According to the results, she has Japanese, African, Jewish, Indigenous, and Italian ancestry, as well as ancestors from the Balkans and Scandinavia. She publicly came out as bisexual during a live stream on Instagram in 2020.

== Career ==
Ana has worked in theater since the age of 12 years and studied Performing Arts at the University of São Paulo. She has appeared in several productions of classical works, including those of Anton Chekhov and Oswald de Andrade. She performed in the play This Property Is Condemned by Tennessee Williams with Grupo Porta Emperrada under the direction of Juliano Barone. She also took part in performances during São Paulo's Cultural Turn festival and in productions such as O Rei da Vela, Três Irmãs, and Auto da Compadecida.

Ana is a member of two theatre companies: Caravana Suspiro and Núcleo Sem Querer de Tentativas Teatrais. In 2017, she portrayed the character Tina, one of the show's main protagonists, in the telenovela Malhação: Viva a Diferença. The series, written by Cao Hamburger, was produced and broadcast by Rede Globo. In 2020, she reprised her role from the original series in its spin off As Five. She has also appeared in two music videos: Ela by Wibe and Amarela by Lina Tag.

== Filmography ==
=== Television ===
| Year | Title | Character | Notes |
|---|---|---|---|
| 2017–18 | Malhação: Viva a Diferença | Cristina Yamada (Tina) | |
| 2018 | Que Marravilha! | Participant | |
| 2020-24 | As Five | Cristina Yamada (Tina) | |
| 2021-22 | Quanto Mais Vida, Melhor! | Vanda Sato (Vandinha) | |
| 2022 | Novelei | Sandra da Silva Toledo (Sandrinha) | Episode: "Torre de Babel" |
| 2023 | No Corre | Karen | Episode: "Hoje É Seu Dia" |
| 2024 | Família É Tudo | Camila Furtado Pereira (Mila) | |
| 2024 | Body By Beth | Luciene Tavares (Lu) | |
| 2024 | Amor da Minha Vida | Júlia Maia | |
| 2026 | Emergência 53 | | |

=== Cinema ===
| Ano | Título | Personagem | Notes |
|---|---|---|---|
| 2013 | Batchan | Leila | |
| 2026 | O Quarto de Giovanna | | |

=== Videos ===
| Year | Title | Artist | Notes |
|---|---|---|---|
| 2018 | Ela | Wibe | |
| 2019 | Amarela | Lina Tag | |
