= Sabrina Petraglia =

Brazilian actress

Sabrina Petraglia Balsalôbre
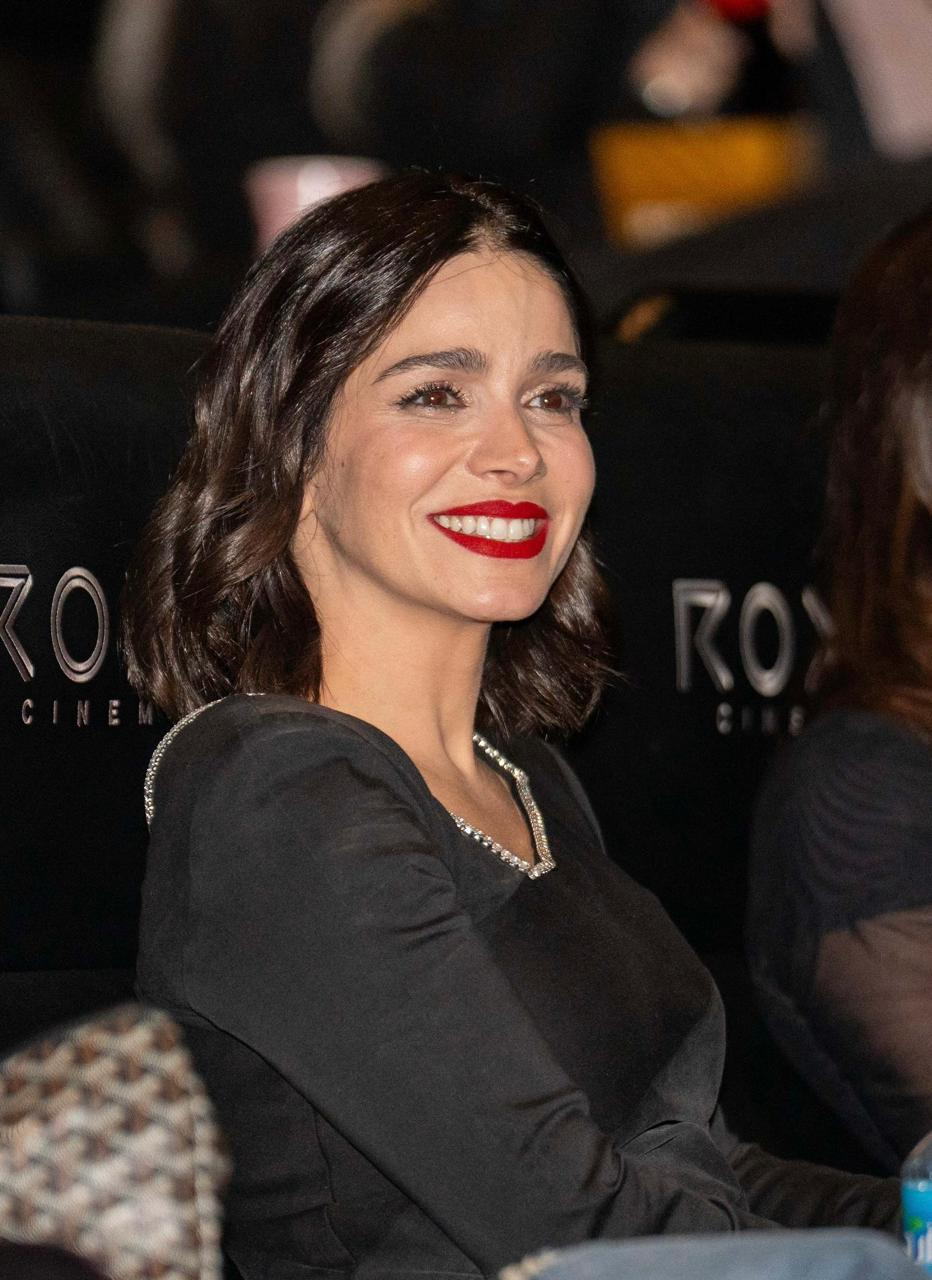
- Born: April 16, 1983 (age 42); São Paulo, Brazil
- Occupations: Actress, model, journalist, and businesswoman
- Years active: 2007-present
- Partner: Ramón Velázquez (m. 2018)
- Children: 3

Sabrina Petraglia Balsalôbre (born April 16, 1983) is a Brazilian actress, model, and businesswoman best known for her role as Shirlei in the hit Rede Globo soap opera Haja Coração. Since 2023, she has lived in Dubai in the United Arab Emirates.

== Biography ==
Petraglia was born on April 16, 1983, in São Paulo. In 1990, aged seven, she started theatre classes at school. In 2004, she graduated with a BA in Multimedia Communications from PUC-SP, one of the most prominent universities in São Paulo. In 2009 she graduated in acting from the Escola de Arte Dramática.

== Career ==
Petraglia started her acting career in theatre, performing in various plays in Brazil, including the leading female role in Zen Salles' highly rated play Pororoca. Directed by Sérgio Ferrara, it ran at Teatro Popular do SESI Paulista in São Paulo in 2010.

Her first appearance on television came in 2010 in the SBT telenovela Uma Rosa Com Amor In 2013, she made her TV Globo debut in the Flor do Caribe, but it was her role in Alto Astral a year later as Italia, a nurse in crisis after having an intimate video exposed online, that saw her become nationally famous.

In 2016, she was cast in a principal role in Haja Coração, playing the part of Shirlei, a girl born with a birth defect. Her performances saw her nominated for a Best Supporting Actress award at the 2016 Premio Extra de Televisão and Best Actress at the 2017 Trofeu Internet awards.

In 2017, she starred in Tempo de Amar as a feminist, before two years later working with Oscar-nominated director Fernando Meirelles in HBO crime series Pico da Neblina (Joint Venture). Between 2020 and 2021 she played the part of a business manager in Salve-se Quem Puder.

In 2024, she appeared on Brazilian screens for the first time since moving to Dubai the previous year. With scenes recorded both in the UAE and Brazil, she played the role of Maya in Familia É Tudo.

The same year, she played the protagonist in the short film Mar de Maes, which was written by best-selling author Thais Vilarinho. The film was screened in Dubai in front of a full auditorium, including Petraglia, Vilarinho, and the Brazilian Ambassador to the UAE, Sidney Leon Romero. It was the first Brazilian production to premiere in the Arab country.

== Personal life ==
In addition to her successful career as an actress in Brazil, Petraglia has been expanding her presence internationally through social media where she shares insights and culture from her life in Dubai, drawing much attention both in Brazil and in the Gulf. English-language publications have explored her journey, her transition to life in the UAE, and the projects in which she is involved. In January 2025, she said she had "three projects in the pipeline to promote our literature to a wider audience", as well as plans to produce children's plays in Dubai.

Petraglia is vocal in the championing of causes close to her heart such as female empowerment and protecting the environment for future generations. At the premiere of Mar de Mães, "a heartfelt exploration of motherhood", she wore an upcycled black denim dress by Dunesi, a UAE-based sustainable fashion brand, and was joined on stage after the screening by an all-female panel to discuss their respective experiences of motherhood.

== Filmography ==
=== Television ===
Year	Title	Role	Notes
2010	Uma Rosa com Amor	Tereza Petroni (Terezinha)	
2011	Passione	Sandra (Sandrinha)	Episode: "13 de janeiro"
2013	Flor do Caribe	Simone	
2014	Alto Astral	Itália Pereira	
2016	Haja Coração (Burning Hearts)	Shirlei Rigoni Di Marino	
2017	Tempo de Amar	Olímpia Gomes da Rocha	
2019	Pico da Neblina (Joint Venture)	Nanda	
2020-2021	Salve-se Quem Puder	Micaela Santamarina	
2024	Família É Tudo	Maya de Osma	

=== Cinema ===
Year	Title	Role	Notes
2009	Interação		Short film
2010	O Filho	Sílvia	Short film
2016	Deixe-me Viver	Drª. Kelly Gravado	
2024	Mar de Mães (Ocean of Mothers)	Thaís	Short film

== Theatre ==
Year	Title
2007–08	Os Náufragos da Rua Constança
2009	O Colecionador de Crepúsculos
2010–11	Pororoca
2011	Avalon
2012	Pífaro, Uma Fábula Musical
2013	B.O. Uma Lenda Urbana Humana
2015	A Lenda do Vale da Lua

== Awards and nominations ==
Year	Award	Category	Title	Result
2016	Prêmio Extra de Televisão	Best Supporting Actor	Haja Coração	Nominated
2016	Prêmio Gshow	TV Couple of the Year (w/ Marcos Pitombo)	Haja Coração	Nominated
2016	Troféu UOL TV e Famosos	TV Revelation	Haja Coração	Nominated
2017	Troféu Internet	Best Actress	Haja Coração	Nominated
