= Hans Donner =

Austrian-Brazilian designer

- Born: Hans Jurgen Josef Donner; 31 July 1948 (age 77); Wuppertal, Germany
- Citizenship: German (birth), Austrian (depatriated), Brazilian (current)
- Occupation: Designer
- Spouse: Mila Moreira (m. 1983; div. 1986) Isadora Ribeiro (m. 1987; div. 1992) Valéria Valenssa (m. 2002; div. 2019)
- Website: Official website

Hans Jurgen Josef Donner (Wuppertal, 31 July 1948) is a German-Brazilian designer with Austrian citizenship. His best-known work was creating the logo for Rede Globo, in Brazil.

== Career ==
Donner was born in Germany and grew up in Austria. Between 1965 and 1970 he studied graphic design in Vienna, having worked in studios in the Austrian capital and Switzerland. In 1975, he moved to Brazil with his first work here, which was the creation of the new brand of Rede Globo. From then on, he formed the Department of Videography, which takes care of all the visual programming of the company and all its products: soap operas, line of shows, journalism, children's programs, sport, humor and others. He had his videography works exhibited in Paris, Rome, Milan, London, Edinburgh, Tokyo, Beijing, Moscow, New York, São Paulo and Rio de Janeiro. After a career at TV Globo, he started to have an architecture office.

In 2021, after working 40 years at Rede Globo, Hans made his debut as a real estate architect at Séren Incorporadora.

== Rede Globo ==
Donner was responsible for the vignettes and opening pieces of Globo and many of Rede Globo's programs. Examples of his work are the openings of the programs Sessão da Tarde, Plantão da Globo, Viva o Gordo, TV Colosso, Xou da Xuxa, Os Trapalhões, Chico City, Estados Anysios de Chico City, Chico Anysio Show, Chico Total, Criança Esperança, TV Xuxa, Sítio do Picapau Amarelo, Pirata, Doris para Maiores, Zorra Total, Jornal Nacional, Jornal Hoje, Fantástico, Clip Clip, Show da Virada, Sai de Baixo, Minha Nada Mole Vida, and Xuxa Park. Donner was also responsible for some of the vignettes on RBS TV and opening of soap operas such as Locomotivas, Ti Ti Ti, Deus nos Acuda, Tieta, Rainha da Sucata, Meu Bem, Meu Mal, O Dono do Mundo, Salomé, Selva de Pedra, Anjo Mau, Mulheres de Areia, Roque Santeiro, Vale Tudo, Meu Bem Querer, A Favorita, Caras & Bocas among many others; and also by the design of the scenarios of the station's journalistic programs until 1999. Donner stayed at the station until March 2016, when he was removed by the station after 40 years of service.

Hans Donner is the creator of various objects such as furniture and watches, such as the Onne Watch, former Time Dimension, which has become a gadget available for Microsoft computers and for the iPhone of Apple Inc.

== Personal life ==
He was married to model Valéria Valenssa, with whom he has two children: João Henrique and José Gabriel. Hans met Valenssa in 1990 during a beauty contest and in the recordings of Globo's carnival vignettes. The two divorced in 2019. He has been married, for 6 years, to the actress and girl from Fantástico, Isadora Ribeiro.
