= Girls from Ipanema =

Brazilian web television series

- Promotional poster
- Genre: Period drama
- Created by: Heather Roth; Giuliano Cedroni
- Written by: Heather Roth; Patricia Corso; Leonardo Moreira; Luna Grimberg; Giuliano Cedroni; Mariana Tesch
- Directed by: Caíto Ortiz; Hugo Prata; Julia Rezende
- Starring: Maria Casadevall; Pathy Dejesus; Fernanda Vasconcellos; Mel Lisboa; Leandro Lima; Ícaro Silva; Alexandre Cioletti; Gustavo Vaz; Gustavo Machado; Larissa Nunes
- Opening theme: "The Girl from Ipanema" by Amy Winehouse
- Country of origin: Brazil
- Original language: Portuguese
- No. of seasons: 2
- No. of episodes: 13

Production
- Executive producers: Giuliano Cedroni; Heather Roth; Maria Angela de Jesus; Camila Groch; Francesco Civita; Caíto Ortiz; Beto Gauss
- Producers: Beto Gauss; Francesco Civita
- Production location: Rio de Janeiro
- Camera setup: Multiple-camera
- Running time: 34–56 minutes
- Production company: Prodigo Films

Original release
- Network: Netflix
- Release: March 22, 2019 – June 19, 2020

Girls from Ipanema (Portuguese: Coisa Mais Linda), previously titled Most Beautiful Thing, is a Brazilian period drama television series created by Giuliano Cedroni and Heather Roth. Produced by Prodigo Films, the series had as producers Francesco Civita and Beto Gauss, and Caíto Ortiz as showrunner. It stars Maria Casadevall, Pathy Dejesus, Fernanda Vasconcellos, Mel Lisboa, Leandro Lima and Ícaro Silva. The first season, consisting of seven episodes, premiered on Netflix worldwide on March 22, 2019. On May 13, 2019, Netflix renewed the series for a second season. The second season consists of 6 episodes and was released June 19, 2020.

== Plot ==
Girls from Ipanema follows the story of Malu (Maria Casadevall), a young and wealthy woman from São Paulo who moves to Rio de Janeiro to open a restaurant with her husband. Upon arriving, she discovers that he has abandoned her and fled with all the money. Malu then leaves in search of a new dream amid the emergence of bossa nova in the city with a new love, the musician Chico.

== Cast and characters ==
=== Main ===
- Maria Casadevall as Maria Luiza "Malu" Carone
- Pathy Dejesus as Adélia Araújo
- Fernanda Vasconcellos as Lígia Soares (season 1; guest season 2)
- Mel Lisboa as Thereza Soares
- Leandro Lima as Francisco "Chico" Carvalho
- Ícaro Silva as Capitão
- Alexandre Cioletti as Nelson Soares
- Gustavo Vaz as Augusto Soares
- Gustavo Machado as Roberto
- Larissa Nunes as Ivone Araújo (season 2–present; recurring season 1)

=== Recurring ===
- Esther Góes as Eleonora Soares
- Ondina Clais Castilho as Ester Carone
- Paulo Tiefenthaler as Nanico
- Enrico Cazzola as Carlinhos Carone
- Sarah Vitória as Conceição Araújo
- Thaila Ayala as Helô Albuquerque (season 1)
- João Bourbonnais as Ademar Carone (season 1)
- Kiko Bertholini as Pedro Furtado (season 2)
- Alejandro Claveaux as Wagner Pessanha (season 2)
- Val Perré as Duque Araújo (season 2)
- Eliana Pittman as Elza Ferreira (season 2)
- Breno Ferreira as Miltinho (season 2)

== Episodes ==
Season	Episodes	Originally released
1	7	March 22, 2019
2	6	June 19, 2020

=== Season 1 (2019) ===
No. overall	No. in season	Title	Directed by	Written by	Original release date
1	1	"Welcome to Rio" "Bem-vinda ao Rio"	Caíto Ortiz	Heather Roth	March 22, 2019
2	2	"Girls Are Not Welcome" "Garotas não são bem-vindas"	Caíto Ortiz	Patricia Corso	March 22, 2019
3	3	"Waters of August" "Águas de agosto"	Hugo Prata	Leonardo Moreira	March 22, 2019
4	4	"The Dreamers" "Os Sonhadores"	Julia Rezende	Luna Grimberg & Giuliano Cedroni	March 22, 2019
5	5	"Consequences" "Consequências"	Caíto Ortiz	Patricia Corso	March 22, 2019
6	6	"Letting Go" "Desapego"	Julia Rezende	Heather Roth, Leonardo Moreira & Luna Grimberg	March 22, 2019
7	7	"Ghosts of Past Christmas" "Fantasmas do Natal passado"	Hugo Prata	Heather Roth	March 22, 2019

=== Season 2 (2020) ===
No. overall	No. in season	Title	Directed by	Written by	Original release date
8	1	"I Will Survive" "Sobre viver"	Caíto Ortiz	Heather Roth	June 19, 2020
9	2	"Commitments" "Compromissos"	Caíto Ortiz	Patricia Corso	June 19, 2020
10	3	"The Carioca Way" "Jeitinho carioca"	Caíto Ortiz	Mariana Tesch	June 19, 2020
11	4	"All Female" "Só as mulheres"	Julia Rezende	Patricia Corso	June 19, 2020
12	5	"Second Chance" "Segunda chance"	Julia Rezende	Mariana Tesch	June 19, 2020
13	6	"Choices" "Escolhas"	Julia Rezende	Heather Roth & Patricia Corso	June 19, 2020

== Production ==
On November 6, 2017, Netflix announced the production of a new Brazilian series which would be set in the 1950s with the rise of bossa nova as a backdrop. The series was titled "Coisa Mais Linda" inspired by the song The Girl from Ipanema recorded by João Gilberto and Tom Jobim. On June 29, 2018, it announced the cast of the series and the shooting started in the first week of July, going until October.

== Reception ==
=== Critical reception ===
Tess Cagle from The Daily Dot gave the series a four out of five stars, saying that "Coisa Mais Linda honors the resilience of women from the time period". Writing in Decider, Joel Keller described the series as a "lush look at a woman stuck between her conservative life in São Paulo and the more open life she wants in Rio". The Review Geek gave the series a 7.5 out of 10, commenting that the show "may not have the most original premise" but praising that "the unique blend of aesthetic beauty and character chemistry are enough to keep this one engaging and watchable throughout".

== Soundtrack ==
The soundtrack of the series was composed and produced by João Erbetta. It was released on music streaming services including Spotify, Deezer and Tidal.

Season 1 songs

1. "Ver o Mar (feat. Leandro Lima) (Versão Disco)"
2. "Ver o Mar (feat. Leandro Lima) (Versão Barco)"
3. "Luz do Seu Olhar (feat. Leandro Lima)"
4. "Para Ver Você (feat. Leandro Lima & Fernanda Vasconcellos)"
5. "Morning Song"
6. "Passions"
7. "Com que Roupa Eu Vou"
8. "Branca"
9. "Minha Vida (feat. Marcela Maita)"
10. "Nas Ruas do Rio (feat. Nuria Nogueira & Daniel de Paula)"
11. "O Samba É (feat. Nuria Nogueira)"
12. "Show do Capitão"
