= Rádio Cultura Brasil =

Rádio Cultura Brasil (ZYK 520)
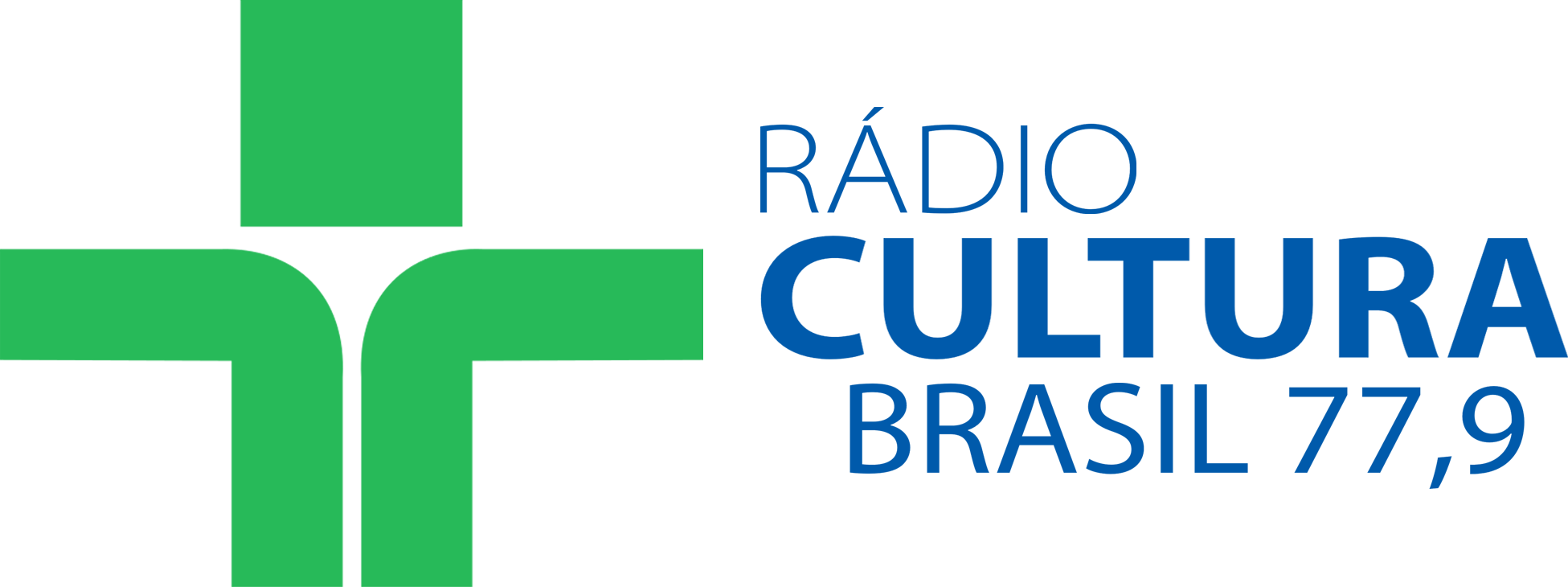
- São Paulo; Brazil
- Frequencies: 1200 kHz; 77.9 MHz

Programming
- Language: Portuguese

Ownership
- Owner: Fundação Padre Anchieta

History
- Founded: June 16, 1936

Technical information
- Licensing authority: ANATEL
- ERP: 50 kW
- Transmitter coordinates: 23°40′37.1″S 46°42′53.9″W

Links
- Webcast: Listen live
- Website: cultura.uol.com.br/radio/

Rádio Cultura Brasil is a Brazilian radio station based in São Paulo, featuring a programming dedicated to Música Popular Brasileira (MPB). It broadcasts on 1200 kHz and 77.9 MHz. The station is managed by the Fundação Padre Anchieta, a foundation of the São Paulo State Government that also operates TV Cultura. It has a sister station, Cultura FM, which focuses on jazz and classical music. Its studios are located in the Lapa de Baixo neighborhood, alongside the other media outlets of the Fundação Padre Anchieta. Its AM transmitters are in the Socorro district, on the banks of the Guarapiranga Reservoir, and its FM transmitter is installed on the Torre Cultura, located in the Sumaré neighborhood.

== History ==
The station originated in the early 1930s as a pastime of brothers Dirceu and Olavo Fontoura, sons of pharmacist Cândido Fontoura, creator of Biotônico Fontoura. The initial clandestine broadcasts took place from a garage on Rua Padre João Manuel and served merely as a learning and entertainment activity for them and their friends. Its first name, DKI - A Voz do Juqueri, was a reference to the now-defunct Juqueri Psychiatric Hospital. Despite issues arising from the illegal transmissions, the Fontouras persisted, soon recognizing their project's significant potential to promote São Paulo's artistic and cultural scene. This led to the official launch of PRE-4 Rádio Cultura, later renamed A Voz do Espaço, on 1300 kHz, with new facilities in the Jabaquara neighborhood housing its transmission tower, offices, and studios.

The inauguration of the Jabaquara headquarters on June 16, 1936, was a major event attended by numerous artistic and cultural figures. While an immediate success with listeners, the location's distance from the city's central hub prompted the proprietors to envision a more prominent base. Thus, in 1937, the project for the future Palácio do Rádio was conceived—a grand building on Avenida São João, then the city's most elegant thoroughfare, designed to house new studios, offices, and an auditorium and fundamentally transform São Paulo's radio landscape.

The Palácio do Rádio was inaugurated on March 28, 1939. The grand opening featured stars from Brazil and abroad, directed by the station's chief announcer, Nicolau Tuma. However, increasing competition and the Fontoura family's need to focus on their pharmaceutical business led them to sell the station in 1940. It subsequently changed hands several times. Despite maintaining a certain quality, the station faced difficulties, lost its in-house talent, and saw declining live audience numbers. The elegant building itself fell into disuse with the rise of television and was ultimately demolished in 1975.

A pivotal change occurred in 1967 when the station, along with TV Cultura, was transferred to the newly created Fundação Padre Anchieta under the management of Diários Associados. This began its definitive shift toward an educational and cultural mission. In the 1970s, it pioneered educational projects like the "Curso Supletivo de Madureza Ginasial" and began FM broadcasts. The 1980s saw the production of more dynamic educational-entertainment programs, such as the youth-oriented "Matéria Prima." By the late 1980s, the station dedicated its programming to MPB.

The station was renamed Rádio Cultura Brasil on August 11, 2008. Marking a significant technological update, on May 7, 2021, it began transmissions on the extended FM band at 77.9 MHz in São Paulo, becoming one of the first AM stations in the city and the country to migrate to this extended frequency range.
