= Maria Casadevall =

Brazilian actress (born 1987)

- Born: Maria Carolina Casadevall Gonzaga; 24 July 1987 (age 38); São Paulo, Brazil
- Occupation: Actress
- Years active: 2009–present
- Height: 1.76 m (5 ft 9 in)
- Partner: Larissa Mares (2021–present)

Maria Carolina Casadevall Gonzaga (born 24 July 1987) is a Brazilian actress.

== Career ==
Casadevall began working as an advertising actress, making her first commercial at age 16. Soon after began to dedicate to the scenic studies of interpretation of TV and cinema with the director Fernando Leal. She has also taken acting courses at the Wolf Maya Academy of Actors.

She began her career in 2009, participating in the plays Roberto Zucco and Hipóteses Para o Amor e a Verdade, staged by the theater company Satyros in São Paulo. Casadevall signs a contract with Rede Globo. She made her television debut in 2011 in the miniseries Lara com Z, and in 2013 she was cast in the cast of Amor à Vida. In 2014, she stars the GNT series Lili, a Ex, adaptated of the homonymous comic strip by Caco Galhardo. In 2015, she plays Margot in the telenovela, I Love Paraisópolis. In 2016, she plays Lili again for Lili, a Ex second season.

In December 2013 she was voted Woman of the Year by the GQ Brasil magazine.

== Personal life ==
She is the second cousin of Céu (a well-known Brazilian singer-songwriter). She is the youngest of the two cousins (Casadevall is 7 years younger than Céu). Casadevall is lesbian, she is in a relationship with her girlfriend Larissa Mares since 2021.

== Filmography ==
=== Television ===
Year	Title	Role
2011	Lara com Z	Maria Valentina Ventura Passos de Albuquerque
2013	Amor à Vida	Patrícia Mileto Gusmão (Paty)
2014–16	Lili, a Ex	Lili
2015	I Love Paraisópolis	Margarida Bidaleque (Margot)
2017	Vade Retro	Lilith
2017	Os Dias Eram Assim	Rimena Garcia
2018	Ilha de Ferro	Júlia Bravo
2019–present	Girls from Ipanema	Maria Luiza Carone
2023	Drag Race Brasil	Herself (Guest judge); Episode: "Brazil Loves Puppets!"

=== Film ===
Year	Title	Role
2015	Depois de Tudo	Bebel
2018	Mulheres Alteradas	Leandra
2019	O Caso Morel	Joana

== Theater ==
Year	Play
2009	Roberto Zucco
2009	Hipóteses Para o Amor e a Verdade
2012	A Nossa Gata Preta e Branca
2016	Phedras por Phedra
2016	Haiti Somos Nós
