= As Five =

Brazilian comedy-drama television series (2020–2024)

- Also known as: We Are Five
- Genre: Comedy drama
- Created by: Cao Hamburger
- Written by: Vitor Brandt; Luna Grimberg; Jasmin Tenucci; Ludmila Naves; Francine Barbosa; Cao Hamburger
- Directed by: Rafael Miranda; Dainara Toffoli; Natália Warth; José Eduardo Belmonte
- Starring: Ana Hikari; Gabriela Medvedovsky; Daphne Bozaski; Manoela Aliperti; Heslaine Vieira
- Country of origin: Brazil
- Original language: Portuguese
- No. of seasons: 3
- No. of episodes: 26

Production
- Running time: 29–46 minutes
- Production company: Estúdios Globo

Original release
- Network: Globoplay
- Release: 12 November 2020 – 1 March 2024

Related
- Malhação: Viva a Diferença

As Five (English title: We Are Five) is a Brazilian comedy-drama television series created by Cao Hamburger for Globoplay. It was produced by TV Globo's production division Estúdios Globo, as a spin-off of Malhação: Viva a Diferença, and premiered on the streaming service on 12 November 2020. Starring Ana Hikari, Gabriela Medvedovsky, Daphne Bozaski, Manoela Aliperti and Heslaine Vieira, the series brings back characters from the original series.

On 16 July 2020, the series was renewed for a second season, which premiered on 8 February 2023. On 29 June 2021, a third season was confirmed. The seasons were produced together in 2022. The third and final season premiered on 1 March 2024.

== Synopsis ==
After six years without seeing each other (and three years since their last group chat on social media), friends Benê, Keyla, Tina, Lica and Ellen are reunited in the Greater São Paulo and realize that the admiration they feel for each other has never been lost, even after long apart. At the height of being 25-year-olds, they are all grappling with personal, professional and relationship conflicts. Together, they feel stronger to face the dilemmas of adult life common to Generation Z.

== Cast and characters ==
=== Main ===
- Ana Hikari as Cristina "Tina" Yamada:
  Cool and sociable, Tina is now a successful DJ in São Paulo with her boyfriend Anderson (Juan Paiva). At the beginning of the series, the gang reunites at Tina's house for an unexpected funeral. Struggling with unresolved conflict and grief, she struggles with her mental health using unhealthy coping mechanisms.
- Gabriela Medvedovsky as Keyla Maria Romano:
  Keyla has been working a series of strange jobs to make money, raising her son Tonico (Matheus Dias) all by herself. She was forced to postpone her dreams to ensure her son's survival. The gang reuniting means she no longer has to parent him alone. With their newfound support, she tries to pursue a career as a musical actress.
- Daphne Bozaski as Benedita "Benê" Teixeira Ramos:
  Extremely methodical, Benê, who is autistic, tries to remain calm, but she can't stand it when things get out of hand and get out of routine. She spent the last few years studying classical music. She lives with Guto (Bruno Gadiol), her boyfriend since school, until a twist separates them and she finds Nem (Thalles Cabral).
- Manoela Aliperti as Heloísa "Lica" Gutierrez:
  Lica has been unable to focus on anything. She's already dropped out of three colleges, has several unfinished projects, and is unemployed at the start of the series. Though intelligent, charming, and confident, Lica's impulsiveness and arrogance gets her into messy situations. She has been completely lost since her relationship with Samantha (Giovanna Grigio) ended.
- Heslaine Vieira as Ellen Rodrigues:
  Because she is so career-focused, Ellen lives a little disconnected from the world of personal relationships. She was an excellent student in high school and her time at MIT in Boston was no different. She finished her degree and completed a master's degree in the United States. She dates Omar (Bilaal Avaz), an American, but her visit to Brazil leaves her uncertain about the directions she had planned for her life.

=== Recurring ===
- Juan Paiva as Anderson Rodrigues
- Giovanna Grigio as Samantha Lambertini
- Thalles Cabral as Nem
- Marcos Oli as Miguel / Michelle Esmeralda
- Matheus Campos as Lito
- Jessé Scarpellini as Samuel
- Tati Ang as Telma Yamada
- Bilaal Avaz as Omar
- Jesuton as Kiara
- Matheus Dias as Antonio "Tonico" Romano dos Santos
- Bruno Gadiol as José Augusto "Guto" Sampaio Neto
- Vinicius Wester as Michel Borovski "MB" Júnior
- Fernanda D'Umbra as Laura

=== Guest ===
- Malu Galli as Marta Gutierrez
- Roberta Santiago as Helena "Nena" da Silva Rodrigues
- Ju Colombo as Maria das Dores Rodrigues
- Carlos Takeshi as Noboru Yamada
- Rafael Vitti as Ariel
- Sophia Abrahão as Dani Junqueira
- Dira Paes as Alice Guimarães
- Yana Sardenberg as Silvinha
- Matheus Fagundes as Kléber
- Guilherme Prates as Jonas

== Series overview ==
Series	Episodes	Originally released	
Series	Episodes	First released	Last released
1	10	12 November 2020	14 January 2021

== Episodes ==
=== Season 1 (2020) ===
No. overall	No. in season	Title	Directed by	Written by	Original release date
1	1	"The Five, Who Gave It That Name?" (As Five, quem deu esse nome mesmo?)	Dainara Toffoli, Rafael Miranda, Natalia Warth & José Eduardo Belmonte	Vitor Brandt, Jasmin Tenucci, Luna Grimberg & Francine Barbosa	12 November 2020
Keyla, Ellen, Lica, Tina and Benê are reunited after six years without seeing each other, during the funeral of Tina's mother. There is a strangeness between them.
2	2	"One Hand Washes the Other" (Uma mão lava a outra)	Dainara Toffoli, Rafael Miranda, Natalia Warth & José Eduardo Belmonte	Luna Grimberg, Vitor Brandt & Jasmin Tenucci	19 November 2020
Lica starts working at MB's restaurant and meets journalist Alice. Benê and Nem help Keyla with Tonico. The five friends laugh at the chaos they live in.
3	3	"Immediate Contacts" (Contatos Imediatos)	Dainara Toffoli, Rafael Miranda, Natalia Warth & José Eduardo Belmonte	Jasmin Tenucci & Ludmila Naves	26 November 2020
Ellen is moved by Lito. Lica decides to take a break from lovemaking. Tina takes her sister to the doctor. Keyla has a date.
4	4	"How Can a Live Fish" (Como pode um peixe vivo)	Dainara Toffoli, Rafael Miranda, Natalia Warth & José Eduardo Belmonte	Luna Grimberg, Vitor Brandt e Ludmila Naves	3 December 2020
Keyla auditioned for a musical show. Benê starts to teach piano to Nem. Lica gets a freelance job. Tina moves in with Lica.
5	5	"Surprise!" (Surpresa!)	Dainara Toffoli, Rafael Miranda, Natalia Warth & José Eduardo Belmonte	Vitor Brandt & Luna Grimberg	10 December 2020
A party begins at Lica's apartment. Nem asks to see Benê's room. Ellen's American fiancée Omar arrives in Brazil by surprise.
6	6	"Five Stories" (Cinco histórias)	Dainara Toffoli, Rafael Miranda & Natalia Warth	Luna Grimberg	17 December 2020
The girls exchange messages about their problems and ask for advice. When Tina is injured, her friends reflect on the destination they have chosen for their lives.
7	7	"Pawn Party" (Festa do peão)	Rafael Miranda, Dainara Toffoli & Natalia Warth	Vitor Brandt	24 December 2020
Ellen introduces Omar to her family. Anderson is bothered by Tina's strange posts on the Internet. Lica talks to Samantha again. Keyla makes a revelation to Samuel.
8	8	"Generation Z" (Geração Z)	Rafael Miranda	Luna Grimberg	31 December 2020
The five friends take Ellen to the airport and something unexpected happens.
9	9	"Hard Work" (Trabalhar cansa)	Rafael Miranda, Dainara Toffoli & Natalia Warth	Vitor Brandt	7 January 2021
Keyla advises a teenager who discovered she was pregnant. Benê has an important experience. Tina suffers when a video of her leaks on the Internet.
10	10	"Tsunami" (Tsunami)	Dainara Toffoli, Rafael Miranda & Natalia Warth	Ludmila Naves, Vitor Brandt & Luna Grimberg	14 January 2021
Lica wants to get closer to Samantha. Ellen presents her thesis. Tina tries to resolve her issues. Keyla takes a class at a music school. Benê and Nem make a decision.

== Production ==
The first season of We Are Five was filmed between August and November 2019, in Rio de Janeiro and São Paulo, and containing 10 episodes. The show is renewed for the second and third seasons, both being produced together in 2022.

== Awards and nominations ==
Year	Award	Category	Nominated	Result
2020	Prêmio F5	Best Drama Series	As Five	Won
2020	Splash Awards	Best National Release	As Five	Won
2021	MTV Millennial Awards	Maratonei	As Five	Won
