= I Love Paraisópolis =

- Genre: Comedy
- Created by: Alcides Nogueira; Mário Teixeira
- Directed by: Wolf Maya
- Starring: Bruna Marquezine; Maurício Destri; Tatá Werneck; Caio Castro; Letícia Spiller; Henri Castelli; Maria Casadevall see more
- Opening theme: "A Cor do Brasil" by Victor Kreutz
- Country of origin: Brazil
- Original language: Portuguese
- No. of episodes: 154

Production
- Production locations: Brazil; New York City, United States
- Running time: 42-45 minutes

Original release
- Network: TV Globo
- Release: May 11 – November 6, 2015

Related
- Alto Astral; Totalmente Demais

I Love Paraisópolis (stylized as I ♥ Paraisópolis; Portuguese: Eu Amo Paraisópolis; or simply Paraisópolis) is a Brazilian access prime telenovela created and written by Alcides Nogueira & Mário Teixeira and directed by Wolf Maya, premiered on May 11, 2015 on TV Globo at 7:35 p.m. / 8:10 p.m. (BRT/AMT).

Bruna Marquezine, Tatá Werneck, Caio Castro, Letícia Spiller, Maria Casadevall, Alexandre Borges, Soraya Ravenle, Caroline Abras, Danton Mello, Fabíula Nascimento, Lucy Ramos, Carolina Oliveira, Dalton Vigh, Nicette Bruno, Henri Castelli and Maurício Destri are in the lead roles.

== Plot ==
Marizete (Mari) and Pandora (Danda) are not blood sisters and dwellers of the community of Paraisópolis, that dream of a better life. Eva and Jurandir (Juju), biological parents of Danda, adopted Mari after her mother, Eva's really good friend, died during childbirth. Mari and Danda grew up together and beyond the relationship as sisters, they developed a great friendship.

Mari dedicates to focus on her studies and work really hard with the dream of giving her own mother a home of her own. Danda, very attractive and vain, has more modest goals, working only to support her vanity, but very dedicated to her sister, her best friend.

A few meters from the community is the luxurious neighborhood of Morumbi, separated only by a street, where an architect named Benjamin lives. This one has a particular project, to redevelop Paraisópolis, the project is criticized by its Benjamin's mother (Soraya) and his stepfather (Gabo). Soraya disapproves of the son's relationship with the residents of the community. The couple holds a majority stake in the construction company Pilartex and sees the Paraisopolis area as a business opportunity, for real estate investment. The plot takes an unexpected turn after Benjamin, Margot's fiancé, meets Mari and falls in love with her.

== Cast ==
Actor/Actress	Character
Bruna Marquezine	Marizete da Silva Antunes (Mari)
Maurício Destri	Benjamin de Albuquerque Brenner
Letícia Spiller	Soraya Maria Marins de Albuquerque Brenner
Tatá Werneck	Pandora Balbino Uchoa (Danda)
Frank Menezes	Evaristo Matheus Salsede Junior (Juneca)
Caroline Abras	Ximena Rodríguez de Freitas
Caio Castro	Gregório Evangelista Mourão (Grego) (Note: He is a powerful Brazilian drug lord and "owner" of Paraisópolis, who tries to maintain and protect his territory against the imminent threat of Giuseppe "Dom Peppino" Sarti, a powerful Italian-American mobster from New York.)
Maria Casadevall	Margot Alcántara Bidalek
Lucy Ramos	Patrícia Machado Barreto
Giullia Buscacio	Bruna Bezerra Antunes
Alexandre Borges	Jurandir Graciano Balbino (Juju)
Soraya Ravenle	Eva Balbino Uchoa (Vivinha)
Pathy Dejesus	Alceste de Medeiros Rebouças
Lima Duarte	Giuseppe Sarti (Dom Peppino) (Note: He is a powerful Italian-American mob boss, who is the powerful Godfather ("Don") of the Italian-American Mafia of New York and the head of the Sarti crime family, considered the most powerful New York crime syndicate.) (Note: He shares the same last name as infamous real-life Italian-American mob boss Joe Bonanno.)
Henri Castelli	Gabriel de Albuquerque Brenner (Gabo)
Dalton Vigh	Tomás Bezerra Antunes
Ângela Vieira	Clarice Bezerra
Nicette Bruno	Izabel Maria Marins de Albuquerque Brenner (Izabelita)
Olívia Araújo	Melodia Pernambucana Freire
Fabíula Nascimento	Paula Evangelista da Conceição (Paulucha Rocambole)
Zezeh Barbosa	Dália Oliveira da Silva (Dalíssima)
Ilana Kaplan	Silvéria Mengarda Recanto de Queiroz
Danton Mello	Cícero de Paula Pereira Sanches
Paula Barbosa	Olga Dalcidi
Dani Ornellas	Deodora de Fátima Almeida/ Deodora Sarti
Carolina Oliveira	Natasha Evangelista da Conceição
Paula Cohen	Rosicler Pereira Sanches
Juliana Lohmann	Neide Aparecida (Neidinha)
Françoise Forton	Isolda Pires da Silva
Eduardo Dussek	Armando Prado (Armandinho)
Mariana Xavier	Claudete Rufino Bantim
Luana Martau	Mirela Recanto de Queiroz
André Loddi	Raul Mendes da Costa
Gil Coelho	Lindomar Recanto de Queiroz
José Dumont	Expedito Rufino Bantim
Tuna Dwek	Ramira Aparecida Rufino Bantim
José Rubens Chachá	Fradique Recanto de Queiroz
Lesliana Pereira	Tairine
Fredy Costa	Robélio
Giovanni Gallo	Tadeu Barros
Daniel Ribeiro	Itamar Timbó
Alice Borges	Albertina Taveira da Anunciação (Tinoca)
Babu Santana	José Polidório (Javai)
Danilo Mesquita	Máximo Evangelista da Conceição (Primo)
Carolina Pismel	Janice Alcoforado Costolla
Maureen Miranda	Ester Matilde Montes
Maria Paula Lima	Urbana Rosália de Castro
Thainá Duarte	Lilica Almeida
Cláudio Fontana	Dilson Alcoforado Costolla
Leandro Daniel	Felisberto Cruz (Sereno) (Note: He is one of Grego's two main henchmen (along with "Bazunga").)
Márcio Rosário	Epaminondas dos Santos (Bazunga) (Note: He is one of Grego's two main henchmen (along with "Sereno").)
Gustavo Piaskoski	Joaquim Bezerra Antunes
Iuri Kruschewsky	Claudinei
Gregoire Blanzat	Lourenço de Albuquerque Brenner
Raffael Pietro	Pedro de Albuquerque Brenner (Pedroca)
Ricardo Blat	Adônia Severiano Rodrigues (Sabão)
Patrícia Elizardo	Monserrá Taveira

== Impact ==
=== Ratings ===
Timeslot	Episodes	Premiere		Finale		Rank	Season	Rating average
Timeslot	Episodes	Date	Viewers (in points)	Date	Viewers (in points)	Rank	Season	Rating average
Mondays—Saturdays; 7:30pm.	155	May 11, 2015	29	November 6, 2015	27	#1	2015	24
