= Rá-Tim-Bum =

Brazilian television series

- Genre: Children's television series; Educational television; Fantasy television
- Created by: Flávio de Souza
- Directed by: Fernando Meirelles
- Starring: Dionisio Jacob; Cláudia Dalla Verde; Anna Muylaert; Flávio de Souza
- Country of origin: Brazil
- Original language: Portuguese
- No. of seasons: 5
- No. of episodes: 192

Production
- Production companies: SESI; TV Cultura

Original release
- Network: TV Cultura
- Release: 5 February 1990 – 26 March 1994

Rá-Tim-Bum (Portuguese pronunciation: [ʁatʃĩˈbũ] is a Brazilian children's TV program produced by TV Cultura and Industrial Social Services (Serviço Social da Indústria, or SESI in Portuguese). The program premiered on TV Cultura on February 5, 1990, replacing Catavento, and stopped production in 1994. As of 2015, the program is shown only on the TV channel, TV Rá-Tim-Bum.

== Production ==
Rá-Tim-Bum was created by Flávio de Souza and Fernando Meirelles in order to educate pre-school children, and extended to 192 episodes.

The program's name, and the sound track were authored by Edu Lobo, and inspired by the last line of the Brazilian happy birthday song Parabéns pra Você. The success of Rá-Tim-Bum led to the follow-on children's TV programs Castelo Rá-Tim-Bum and Ilha Rá-Tim-Bum, and a pay TV channel, TV Rá-Tim-Bum.

== Awards ==
Rá-Tim-Bum was awarded a gold medal at the International Film & TV Festival of New York in 1990.

In 1991 and 1993, Rá-Tim-Bum won the APCA award for Best Children's Program.
