= Isadora Ribeiro =

Brazilian actress

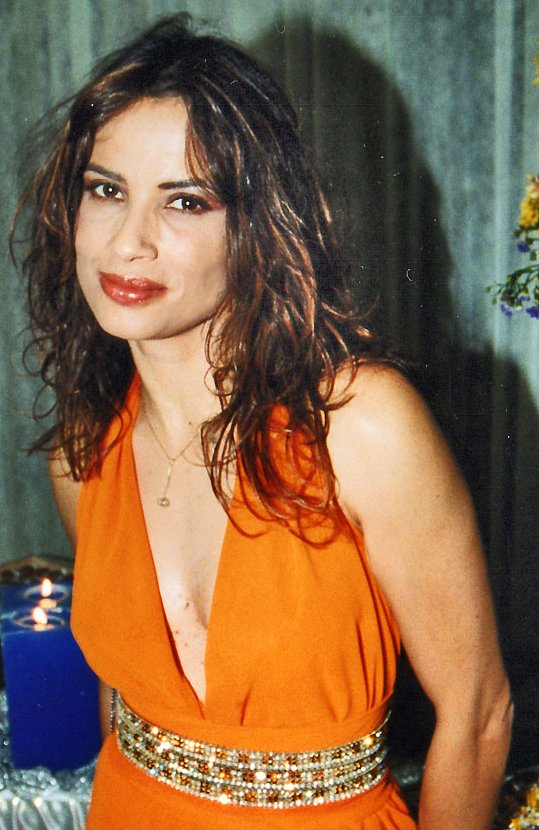
- Isadora Ribeiro in 2000
- Born: 13 June 1965 (age 60); Curitiba, Paraná, Brazil
- Occupations: Actress and Model
- Years active: 1983–present
- Known for: The girl from the opening sequence of Fantástico in 1987
- Spouse: Hans Donner (m. 1987; div. 1992)
- Children: 2

Isadora Ribeiro de Sousa (Curitiba, 13 June 1965) is a Brazilian TV actress.

== Biography ==
Brunette, with indigenous features, and dark brown hair. Isadora Ribeiro became a model in 1983 and moved to Rio de Janeiro. She participated in the tests for the new opening sequence of the program Fantástico, in 1987, on Rede Globo, created by Hans Donner, then designer for the network. Isadora was chosen by José Bonifácio de Oliveira Sobrinho, "Boni", then general director of the television network, to be the prominent figure who, emerging from the middle of the water, would close the opening. For this reason, Isadora became known as the "Girl from Fantástico". Isadora also became very well known for doing the opening of the soap opera Tieta, in 1989, where she appears nude.

== Filmography ==
- 2010 Uma Rosa com Amor - Roberta Vermont (novela sbt).
- 2007 Donas de Casa Desesperadas - Vera Marques (série - Rede TV!)
- 2001 As Filhas da Mãe - Madalena
- 2000 Uga-Uga - Special feature
- 1998 Torre de Babel - Vilma Toledo
- 1997 O Amor Está no Ar - Carmencita Soterro
- 1995 Explode Coração - Odaísa
- 1995 Decadência (minissérie)
- 1994 Pátria Minha - Cilene Miranda
- 1994 A Madona de Cedro - Neusa (minissérie)
- 1993 Fera Ferida - Dna. Marqueza(participação especial)
- 1993 Mulheres de Areia - Vera Soares de Azevedo
- 1992 Pedra sobre Pedra - Suzana
- 1990 Brasileiras e Brasileiros - Tereza de Ogum (SBT)
