= Max Mallmann =

Brazilian novelist and screenwriter (1968–2016)

- Born: Max Mallmann Souto Pereira; October 18, 1968; Porto Alegre, Rio Grande do Sul, Brazil
- Died: November 4, 2016 (aged 48); Rio de Janeiro, Rio de Janeiro, Brazil
- Education: Federal University of Rio Grande do Sul
- Occupations: Novelist, short story writer, screenwriter
- Spouse: Adriana Lunardi
- Writing career
- Years active: 1989–2016
- Genres: Historical fiction, urban fantasy, magic realism
- Notable works: Mundo Bizarro, Síndrome de Quimera, Zigurate, Desiderius Dolens series
- Notable awards: Prêmio Açorianos (1997)

Max Mallmann Souto Pereira (October 18, 1968 – November 4, 2016) was a Brazilian Prêmio Açorianos-winning novelist, short story writer and screenwriter specialized in historical fiction, urban fantasy and magic realism. In 2018 he was named one of the most important Brazilian fantasy writers of the 21st century, alongside André Vianco, Eduardo Spohr and Raphael Draccon.

== Biography ==
Max Mallmann was born in Porto Alegre, Rio Grande do Sul on October 18, 1968. He graduated in Law from the Federal University of Rio Grande do Sul, and even passed the bar examination of the Order of Attorneys of Brazil, but never followed the profession. While growing up, he enjoyed reading stories by Jorge Luis Borges, Edgar Allan Poe and Monteiro Lobato, and comic books by Carl Barks, which motivated him to become a writer. After publishing many short stories in different magazines, his debut novel, Confissão do Minotauro, came out in 1989, when he was only 21 years old. Seven years later he published Mundo Bizarro, which awarded him a Prêmio Açorianos in 1997.

In 1999 Mallmann moved to Rio de Janeiro, where he found work as a in-house screenwriter for Rede Globo. During his tenure with Globo, he wrote for television series and telenovelas such as Malhação, Coração de Estudante, Carga Pesada and A Grande Família, and also created the children's microseries Clara e o Chuveiro do Tempo, broadcast from December 18, 2005 to January 12, 2006. Around the same time he published two of his most critically acclaimed novels: Síndrome de Quimera in 2000 (which was shortlisted for a Prêmio Jabuti the following year) and Zigurate: Uma Fábula Babélica in 2003.

In 2010 he published O Centésimo em Roma, the first novel of the Desiderius Dolens series. The series focuses on the eponymous antihero, a centurion who lives in Ancient Rome during the Year of the Four Emperors. The second installment, As Mil Mortes de César, came out in 2014. A third one, A Prole da Loba, was left unfinished.

In September 2015 Mallmann was diagnosed with lung cancer, eventually dying from the disease on November 4, 2016, at the age of 48. Until his death he was working with his wife, fellow writer Adriana Lunardi, on the web television series Ilha de Ferro, which finally premiered on November 14, 2018.

== Bibliography ==
Desiderius Dolens series

- O Centésimo em Roma (Editora Rocco, 2010)
- As Mil Mortes de César (Editora Rocco, 2014)

Non-series novels

- Confissão do Minotauro (IEL/IGEL, 1989)
- Mundo Bizarro (Mercado Aberto, 1996)
- Síndrome de Quimera (Editora Rocco, 2000)
- Zigurate: Uma Fábula Babélica (Editora Rocco, 2003)
