= Ilha de Ferro =

- Genre: Drama
- Created by: Adriana Lunardi; Max Mallmann
- Starring: Cauã Reymond; Maria Casadevall; Herbert Richers Jr.; Taumaturgo Ferreira; Klebber Toledo; Sophie Charlotte; Mariana Ximenes; Eriberto Leão; Rômulo Estrela; Daphne Bozaski
- Theme music composer: Ego Kill Talent
- Opening theme: "Heroes, Kings and Gods"
- Country of origin: Brazil
- Original language: Portuguese
- No. of seasons: 2
- No. of episodes: 22

Production
- Production location: Rio de Janeiro
- Cinematography: Carlos André Zalasik
- Production company: Estúdios Globo

Original release
- Network: Globoplay
- Release: November 14, 2018 – October 25, 2019

Ilha de Ferro (transl. Iron Island) is a Brazilian drama streaming television series created by Max Mallmann and Adriana Lunardi for Globoplay. Directed by Afonso Poyart, and produced by TV Globo's production division Estúdios Globo, it premiered on the streaming service on November 14, 2018.

The series follows the story of a team of oil tankers workers that are divided between the dilemmas of their personal life on land and working on the high seas. It is the last credited work of Mallmann, who died some months prior to the series' premiere.

== Premise ==
Dante (Cauã Reymond) is the production coordinator of PLT-137, an oil rig known for its accidents history. He dreams of becoming manager of the oil rig, but is angry when he realizes he needs to compete with the newcomer Julia (Maria Casadevall) for the job. However, it is in the midst of this dispute that ends up a passion between the two able to change the course of their lives.

== Cast ==
=== Main ===
- Cauã Reymond as Dante
- Maria Casadevall as Júlia
- Herbert Richers Jr. as Horácio Bravo
- Taumaturgo Ferreira as Buda
- Klebber Toledo as Bruno (main, seasons 1; guest, season 2)
- Sophie Charlotte as Leona (season 1)
- Mariana Ximenes as Dr. Olívia Dias (season 2)
- Eriberto Leão as Diogo Bravo (season 2)
- Rômulo Estrela as Ramiro (season 2)
- Daphne Bozaski as Maria Eduarda Giordano (season 2)

=== Recurring and guests ===
- Cássia Kis as Isabel
- Osmar Prado as João Bravo
- Jonathan Azevedo as Fiapo
- Milhem Cortaz as Astério
- Moacyr Franco as Amorim
- Bruce Gomlevsky as Leviatã

== Production ==
The filming of the first season of the series ended on May 12, 2018, in Rio de Janeiro. A reproduction of the oil extraction platform was built at the Globo Studios.

== Release ==
The series had its first season of 12 episodes released at Globoplay on November 14, 2018.

== Episodes ==
Season	Episodes	Originally released
1	12	November 14, 2018
2	10	October 25, 2019

=== Season 1 (2018) ===
No. overall	No. in season	Title	Original release date
1	1	"Ninguém é uma Ilha"	November 14, 2018
2	2	"Para Sempre"	November 14, 2018
3	3	"O Labirinto"	November 14, 2018
4	4	"Assim na Terra como no Mar"	November 14, 2018
5	5	"Respiração Artificial"	November 14, 2018
6	6	"Fantasmas"	November 14, 2018
7	7	"Vir à Tona"	November 14, 2018
8	8	"Culpados"	November 14, 2018
9	9	"A Terra que nos Devora"	November 14, 2018
10	10	"Todo Mundo é uma Ilha"	November 14, 2018
11	11	"Inferno 1"	November 14, 2018
12	12	"Inferno 2"	November 14, 2018

=== Season 2 (2019) ===
No. overall	No. in season	Title	Original release date
13	1	"O Inferno de Dante"	October 25, 2019
14	2	"Ilhas"	October 25, 2019
15	3	"Partidas e Chegadas"	October 25, 2019
16	4	"Eterno Retorno"	October 25, 2019
17	5	"Juntos"	October 25, 2019
18	6	"Viver é Perigoso"	October 25, 2019
19	7	"Morrer é uma Grande Aventura"	October 25, 2019
20	8	"Futuro"	October 25, 2019
21	9	"Karma"	October 25, 2019
22	10	"Primeiro Óleo"	October 25, 2019
