= Família é Tudo =

- Genre: Telenovela
- Created by: Daniel Ortiz
- Written by: Flávia Bessone; Nilton Braga; Daisy Chaves; Cláudio Lisboa
- Directed by: Fred Mayrink
- Starring: Arlete Salles; Nathalia Dill; Juliana Paiva; Thiago Martins; Isacque Lopes; Ramille; Renato Góes; Raphael Logam; Jayme Matarazzo
- Theme music composer: Lee Marcucci; Rita Lee
- Opening theme: "Jardins da Babilônia" by Jão ft. Julia Mestre
- Country of origin: Brazil
- Original language: Portuguese
- No. of seasons: 1
- No. of episodes: 177

Production
- Producers: Mariana Pinheiro; Claudio Dager
- Production company: Estúdios Globo

Original release
- Network: TV Globo
- Release: 4 March – 27 September 2024

Família é Tudo (English title: All About Family) is a Brazilian telenovela created by Daniel Ortiz. It aired on TV Globo from 4 March 2024 to 27 September 2024. The telenovela stars Arlete Salles, Nathalia Dill, Juliana Paiva, Thiago Martins, Isacque Lopes, Ramille, Renato Góes, Raphael Logam and Jayme Matarazzo.

== Plot ==
Twin sisters Frida Mancini and Catarina Mancini have opposite personalities and harbor different desires in their personal lives. While Catarina never resigned herself to living in the shadow of her sister, whom she deeply envies, Frida's sole objective is to reunite her five grandchildren, separated by their respective mothers after the death of Pedro, their father and the matriarch's only son. Frida's grandchildren are Venus, founder of an NGO responsible for helping young people in situations of extreme poverty; the jealous Jupiter, a womanizer who is always trying to prevent his mother Leda from getting a boyfriend; the arrogant Andromeda, an aspiring singer who sings out of tune; the wronged Electra, a young woman who spent years of her life in prison accused of a crime she did not commit; and the explosive and temperamental Pluto, a young man who dreams of being a national skateboarding champion.

Having grown up in disunity and taking different paths in their personal lives as adults, the five siblings will meet again and live together after a tragedy shakes their lives: Frida is presumed dead after an incident on a cruise ship, in which her nephew Hans is the main witness, and also the main person interested, as this would be his great chance to get his hands on his aunt's fortune alongside his mother, Catarina. Led by Venus, the eldest of the siblings, the five are surprised by a clause in Frida's will, which orders that the five live and work together for a year. If one of the grandchildren fails to comply with the agreement, the sole heir to her fortune will become Hans, who will do everything to torment the lives of his cousins.

== Cast ==
=== Main ===
- Arlete Salles as Frida Mancini and Catarina Mancini Galindo
- Nathalia Dill as Vênus Mancini
  - Bruna Negendank as Young Vênus
- Juliana Paiva as Electra Mancini
- Thiago Martins as Júpiter Anchieta Mancini
- Isacque Lopes as Plutão Mancini
  - Gael Santos as Young Plutão
- Ramille as Andrômeda Mancini
  - Lunna Beatriz as Young Andrômeda
- Raphael Logam as Hans Mancini Galindo
- Renato Góes as Tomás Monteiro "Tom"
- Jayme Matarazzo as Luca Baggio
- Paulo Lessa as Leonardo Coelho "Léo" / Netuno
- Ana Hikari as Camila Furtado Pereira "Mila"
- Lucy Ramos as Paulina Monteiro
- Rafa Kalimann as Jéssica de Osma
- Daphne Bozaski as Lupita Maria Del Rosario Sanchez Perez de La Cruz
- Daniel Rangel as Augusto do Nascimento "Guto"
- Gabriel Godoy as Francisco do Nascimento "Chicão"
- Henrique Barreira as Murilo Baggio
- Sérgio Malheiros as Ernesto Garcia
- Grace Gianoukas as Leda Anchieta Mancini
- Cris Vianna as Lucimeire Mancini "Lulu"
- Ana Carbatti as Fernanda Mancini "Nanda"
- Alexandra Richter as Brenda Monteiro
- Jayme Periard as Ramón Monteiro
- Marianna Armellini as Sheila da Guia
- Conrado Caputto as Enéas
- Cristina Pereira as Marieta Calando
- Sabrina Petraglia as Maya de Osma
- João Baldasserini as Ernesto Garcia
- Caio Vegatti as Max
- Robson Torinni as Cláudio
- Aisha Moura as Nicole Paz
- Nina Frosi as Beatriz "Bia"
- Mila Carmo as Chantal Grecco
- Marcelo Médici as Ubaiara
- Caio Giovani as Wilson Fernandes
- Claudio Torres Gonzaga as Furtado
- Alan Oliveira as Babbo
- Guilherme Canellas as Haroldo "Haroldinho"
- Aleh Silva as Kleberson
- Antônio Caramelo as Pudim Monteiro
- Sophia Rosa as Laura Monteiro "Laurinha"
- Heloísa Storani as Eva

=== Guest stars ===
- Paulo Tiefenthaler as Pedro Mancini
- Thaila Ayala as Elisa
- Fernando Pavão as Mathias Galvão
- Lívia Rossy as Gina Magione
- Márcio Vito as Otto
- Danielle Winits as Lizandra Chaves
- Day Mesquita as Marta
- Guida Vianna as Nair
- Kayky Brito as Memo
- David Pinheiro as Juvenal Oliveira / Jules
- Malu Falangola as Norma
- Manuela Duarte as Patty
- Gil Hernandez as Estêvão
- Daniel Andrade as Rogério
- Monique Curi as Doctor Dulce
- Felipe Hintze as Renzo
- Bruna Aiiso as Doctor Pilar
- Antônio Fragoso as Pastor Jonas
- Jhulia Ficer as Ana Paula Wirthmann
- Mônica Corazza as Nildes
- Francisco Salgado as Nilton
- Stephanie Serrat as Carla
- Rodrigo Candelot as Bráulio
- Bruno Miranda
- Luciano Huck as himself
- Matheus & Kauan as themselves
- Flávia Alessandra as herself
- Luiza Possi as Herself
- Bob Burnquist as himself
- Bryan Behr as himself

== Ratings ==
Season	Episodes	First aired		Last aired		Avg. viewers (points)
Season	Episodes	Date	Viewers (points)	Date	Viewers (points)	Avg. viewers (points)
1	177	4 March 2024	19.8	27 September 2024	23.3	20.7
