= Pathy Dejesus =

Brazilian actress, model and television presenter

Pathy De Jesus
- Born: Patricia de Jesus; February 9, 1977 (age 48); São Paulo, Brazil
- Occupations: Actress; model; television presenter
- Years active: 1994–present

Patricia de Jesus (born February 9, 1977), known as Pathy De Jesus is a Brazilian actress, model and television presenter.

== Filmography ==
Television
Year	Title	Role	Notes
2005	Belíssima	Alice	
2007	Caminhos do Coração	Perpétua Salvador	
2008	Os Mutantes: Caminhos do Coração	Perpétua Salvador	
2009	Mutantes: Promessas de Amor	Perpétua Salvador	
2010	Uma Rosa com Amor	Alabá	
2011	Amor e Revolução	Nina Madeira	
2012	Avenida Brasil	Jéssica	
2013	Top 10 MTV	Main Host	
2013	Acesso MTV	Main Host	
2015	I Love Paraisópolis	Alceste	
2016	Lili, a Ex	Marisa	Episode: Fantasma!
2018	Desnude	Laura	
2018	Rua Augusta	Nicole	
2018	Rotas do Ódio	Jaqueline	
2019	Girls from Ipanema	Adélia	Main role
2021	Um Lugar ao Sol	Ruth	
