= André Vianco =

Brazilian novelist, screenwriter and filmmaker (born 1975)

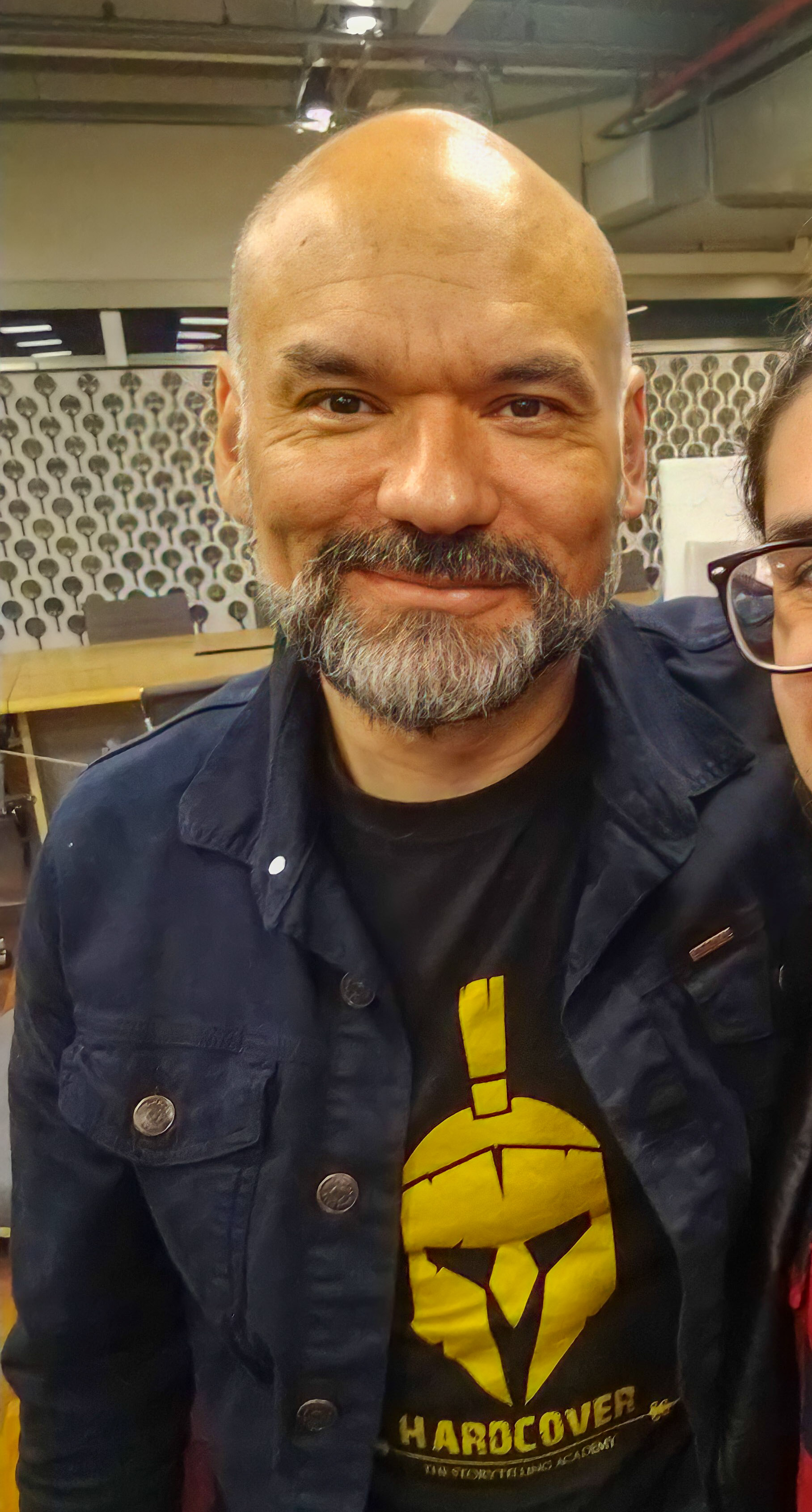
- Vianco in 2019
- Born: André Ferreira da Silva; January 10, 1975 (age 51); São Paulo, Brazil
- Occupations: Novelist, film director, television director, screenwriter
- Spouse: Marisa Samogin
- Children: 3
- Writing career
- Years active: 1998–present
- Genres: Horror, supernatural fiction, apocalyptic fiction, urban fantasy, ghost story, thriller, vampire fiction, science fiction, children's literature
- Notable works: Os Sete, Sétimo, O Turno da Noite series, O Vampiro-Rei series
- Website: andrevianco.online

André Ferreira da Silva (born January 10, 1975), better known by his pen name André Vianco, is a Brazilian best-selling novelist, screenwriter, and film and television director. Specialized in urban fantasy and horror, supernatural and vampire fiction, he rose to fame in 1999 with the novel Os Sete. As of 2016, his books have sold over a million copies, and in 2018 he was named, alongside Max Mallmann, Raphael Draccon and Eduardo Spohr, one of the leading Brazilian fantasy writers of the 21st century.

== Biography ==
André Ferreira da Silva was born in São Paulo on January 10, 1975, but raised in the neighboring town of Osasco. His pen name, "Vianco", was adopted by him as a homage to the street in which he grew up during his childhood, the Dona Primitiva Vianco Street, which is an important street of downtown Osasco. Vianco was always into horror films and literature, and cites Stephen King (to whom he is frequently compared), Eiji Yoshikawa's Musashi, Edgar Allan Poe, Anne Rice's The Vampire Chronicles, Henry James, Victor Hugo and old Tales from the Crypt comics as some of his favorite readings and major influences. He began his career working as redactor for radio station Jovem Pan FM's journalism department, where he stayed for two years, and also had a part-time job at a credit card company. He self-published his debut novel, O Senhor da Chuva, in 1998.

After being fired from his job at the credit card company, Vianco used his FGTS money to self-publish, in a limited print of 1,000, his magnum opus Os Sete in 1999. Set for the most part in the fictional coastal town of Amarração, Rio Grande do Sul, the book tells the story of a group of seven vampires from 16th-century Portugal, awakened from their deep slumber in late 20th-century Brazil after their bodies are found by two divers in a sunken carrack. A critical and commercial success, it has sold over 50,000 copies as of 2008. The book caught the attention of publisher Novo Século Editora, which re-released it just one year later and was responsible for publishing many of Vianco's subsequent works. Os Sete has also spawned the sequels Sétimo and the trilogy O Turno da Noite, and the prequel Vampiros do Rio Douro, a graphic novel in two volumes illustrated by Rodrigo Santana. In 2009, to celebrate the 10th anniversary of Os Sete, Vianco himself wrote and directed a 3-part TV pilot based on the O Turno da Noite trilogy, but it was never picked up for a full series. In 2012 he teamed up with Davi "Deivs" Mello and illustrator Denilson Santtos to write Escuridão Eterna, a graphic novel spin-off of O Turno da Noite; it came out amid mixed reviews.

After publishing the supernatural thrillers Sementes no Gelo and A Casa in 2002, he returned to vampire fiction with Bento in 2003, the first installment of the O Vampiro-Rei series; it was followed by A Bruxa Tereza (2004) and Cantarzo (2005), and by the prequel series As Crônicas do Fim do Mundo – the first installment, A Noite Maldita, came out in 2013; the second, À Deriva, was announced by Vianco in his official website in February 2019 and released in June 2023.

In 2010, after many years with Novo Século, Vianco signed with Editora Rocco to release O Caso Laura, which came out in the following year. Also through Rocco he published the children's book series Meus Queridos Monstrinhos, which has three volumes as of 2014. In 2015 he released through Giz Editorial's imprint Calíope the ghost novel Estrela da Manhã.

In 2016 Vianco signed with Editora Aleph to re-release all of his early works. In the same year, he published his first science fiction novel, Dartana, through Rocco's imprint Fábrica231. On May 29, 2017, Vianco announced on his official Facebook page that the deal with Aleph fell through for unspecified reasons, and that his older books would be eventually republished by Leya Brasil. Also through Leya he released his seventeenth novel (and twenty-third literary work overall), Penumbra, on October 31, 2017. In November 2021, Citadel Editora acquired the rights to Vianco's works, and a re-issue of Bento came out soon after.

In 2018 he announced for an interview with Jornal do Brasil that he began work on a new novel, 40 Luas, originally slated for a 2020 release.

On August 13, 2021, Vianco released the audiobook Ao Meu Redor through streaming service Storytel. It was re-released as a physical book on July 20, 2025, through Citadel Editora's then-newly founded imprint Lucens.

Alongside Wanda Nogueira he co-directed the short film A Flor in 2006 (written by his wife, Marisa Samogin, and based on Carlos Drummond de Andrade's short story "Flor, Telefone, Moça"), and also directed A Última Partida in 2007 (based on a short story by himself) and Saia do Meu Quarto in 2012 (written by Estevão Ribeiro). All three were produced by Criamundos, a now-defunct independent film production company created by Vianco and Samogin in 2006. In an interview from 2008 he stated that he was involved in a film adaptation of A Casa, reported to be in pre-production, but since then no further announcements regarding it were given. In the same interview he also said that he was planning to adapt Os Sete and Bento as well.

Vianco currently lives in Osasco, with his wife and three daughters.

== Bibliography ==
Vampiros do Rio Douro series

- Os Sete (self-published, 1999 (Note: Re-released in 2000 by Novo Século Editora and in 2016 by Editora Aleph))
- Sétimo (Novo Século Editora, 2002 (Note: Re-released in 2016 by Editora Aleph))
- O Turno da Noite, Vol. 1: Os Filhos de Sétimo (Novo Século Editora, 2006)
- O Turno da Noite, Vol. 2: Revelações (Novo Século Editora, 2006)
- O Turno da Noite, Vol. 3: O Livro de Jó (Novo Século Editora, 2007)
- Vampiros do Rio Douro, Vol. 1 (Novo Século Editora, 2007)
- Vampiros do Rio Douro, Vol. 2 (Novo Século Editora, 2007)
- O Turno da Noite: Escuridão Eterna (Novo Século Editora, 2012; co-written with Deivs Mello)

O Vampiro-Rei series

- Bento (Novo Século Editora, 2003 (Note: Re-released in 2021 by Citadel Editora))
- A Bruxa Tereza (Novo Século Editora, 2004 (Note: Re-released in 2022 by Citadel Editora))
- Cantarzo (Novo Século Editora, 2005 (Note: Re-released in 2025 by Citadel Editora))
- As Crônicas do Fim do Mundo, Vol. 1: A Noite Maldita (Novo Século Editora, 2013 (Note: Re-released in 2023 by Citadel Editora))
- As Crônicas do Fim do Mundo, Vol. 2: À Deriva (Citadel Editora, 2023)

Meus Queridos Monstrinhos series

- Zumbi – O Terrível Ataque das Rãs do Nepal (Editora Rocco, 2013)
- Bruxa – Um Feriado Assombroso na Floresta (Editora Rocco, 2014)
- Vampiro – Uma Tenebrosa Noite de Sustos, Doces e Travessuras (Editora Rocco, 2014)

Non-series novels

- O Senhor da Chuva (self-published, 1998 (Note: Re-released in 2001 by Novo Século Editora and in 2022 by Citadel Editora))
- Sementes no Gelo (Novo Século Editora, 2002)
- A Casa (Novo Século Editora, 2002)
- O Caminho do Poço das Lágrimas (Novo Século Editora, 2008)
- O Caso Laura (Editora Rocco, 2011)
- Estrela da Manhã (Calíope/Giz Editorial, 2015)
- Dartana (Fábrica231/Editora Rocco, 2016)
- Penumbra (Leya, 2017)
- Ao Meu Redor (Storytel, 2021 (Note: Re-released in 2025 by Lucens/Citadel Editora))
- 40 Luas (TBA)
