= TV Rá-Tim-Bum =

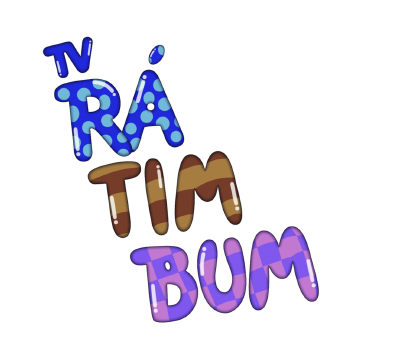
- Channel logo
- Country: Brazil
- Broadcast area: United States (2007); Portugal (2009); Japan (2009)
- Affiliates: TV Cultura

Programming
- Language: Portuguese
- Picture format: 1080i (HDTV); 480i (SDTV)

Ownership
- Owner: Fundação Padre Anchieta
- Sister channels: TV Cultura; Univesp TV; Multicultura Educação; Rádio Cultura Brasil; Cultura FM

History
- Launched: 1 December 2004; 21 years ago

Links
- Website: http://tvratimbum.cmais.com.br

TV Ra-Tim-Bum is a Brazilian cable and satellite TV channel. It is run by the Padre Anchieta Foundation and most of its programming is aimed at children. At first the channel's programming consisted entirely of Brazilian productions, though that has changed in recent years. Many shows are reruns of TV Cultura material, though it also produces and co-produces original content. The channel started operations in December 2004.

In 2007 it became available in the United States. In 2009 the station became available in Portugal.

== Programs ==
=== Live-action ===
==== Current ====
- 1,2,3 agora é sua vez (1,2,3 now turn)
- Baú de Histórias (Chest of Stories)
- Castelo Rá-Tim-Bum (Castle Rá-Tim-Bum)
- Cocoricó
- Como Cuidar do Seu Melhor Amigo (How to Care for Your Best Friend)
- Glub-Glub
- Grandes Personagens (Great Characters)
- Ilha Rá-Tim-Bum (Island Rá-Tim-Bum)
- Lá vem história (There is history)
- Mundo da Lua (World of the Moon)
- Passeio animal (Ride animal)
- Qual É, Bicho? (What is, Bug?)
- Rá-Tim-Bum
- Teatro Rá-Tim-Bum (Theatre Rá-Tim-Bum)
- Vila Sésamo (Sesame Street)
- X-Tudo (X-All)

==== Canceled ====
- Ursinhos Carinhosos (Care Bears)
- As Meninas Superpoderosas (The Powerpuff Girls)
- Álbum da Natureza (Album of Nature)
- Bambalalão
- Bebê + (Baby +)
- Catalendas
- Cambalhota (Tumbling)
- Cineminha (Little Cinema)
- Cine Rá-Tim-Bum
- Dando Bandeira (Giving Flag)
- Dango Balango
- Esporte Clube Rá-Tim-Bum (Sports Club Rá-Tim-Bum)
- Sua língua (Its Language)

=== Cartoon ===
==== Current ====
- A Mansão Maluca do Professor Ambrósio (The Amazing Professor Ambrosius´ Mansion)
- Brichos
- Cantigas de Roda
- Doutor Raio X (Doctor X-Ray)
- Escola pra Cachorro (Doggy Day School)
- Isso Disso (So That)
- Juro que vi (I swear I saw)
- Kiara e os Luminitos (Kiara and the Luminitos)
- Nilba e os Desastronautas (Newbie and the Disasternauts)
- O Papel das Histórias (The Role of Stories)
- Os Caça-Livros (The Hunter-Books)
- Os Ecoturistinhas (The Little Eco-Tourists)
- Os Reciclados (The Recycled)
- Palavras Mágicas (Magic Words)
- Pequenos Cientistas (Little Scientists)
- Portuguesitos Esporte Clube (Portuguesitos Sports Club)
- Quarto do Jobi (Jobi's Room)
- Sidney
- Simão e Bartolomeu (Simão and Bartolomeu)
- Som na Caixa com DJ Cão (Sound Box with DJ Dog)
- Tchibum TV
- Traçando Arte
- T.R.EX.C.I

==== Canceled ====
- Abelhinhas (Little Bees)
- Brasil Futebol Clube (Brazil Soccer Club)
- De Onde Vem? (Where Does It Come From?)
- Escola de Princesinhas (Little Princess School)
- Gelê
- Mila e co. (Mila and co.)
- Lanterna Mágica (Magic Lantern)
- O que eu vou ser quando crescer? (What will I be when I grow up?)
- Os Carrinhos (Little Cars)
- Show do DJ Cão (DJ Dog Show)
- Turma do Lambe-Lambe (Lambe-Lambe's Gang)
