= Castelo Rá-Tim-Bum =

Brazilian children's TV program

- Genre: Children's television series; Educational television; Fantasy
- Created by: Flávio de Souza; Cao Hamburger
- Directed by: Anna Muylaert; Cao Hamburger
- Starring: Cássio Scapin; Sérgio Mamberti; Rosi Campos; Cinthya Rachel; Luciano Amaral; Freddy Allan
- Country of origin: Brazil
- Original language: Portuguese
- No. of seasons: 1
- No. of episodes: 90 (+1 special)

Production
- Running time: 30 minutes
- Production companies: FIESP; TV Cultura

Original release
- Network: TV Cultura
- Release: 9 May 1994 – 24 December 1997

Castelo Rá-Tim-Bum (Portuguese pronunciation: [kasˈtɛlu ʁatʃĩˈbũ], lit. "Ra-Tim-Bum Castle") is a Brazilian children's program produced and broadcast by TV Cultura and the Network Service of Television. Targeted toward children and youth, it follows an educational entertainment model, being composed of several segments targeting specific knowledge areas, such as science and history. The program premiered on May 9, 1994, and stopped production in 1997. Partially inspired by the educational program Rá-Tim-Bum, it gave rise to a television franchise, which is part of Island Rá-Tim-Bum. Castelo Rá-Tim-Bum is a creation of the playwright Flavio de Souza and director Cao Hamburger, with scripts Jacob Dionisio (Tacus), Cláudia Dalla Verde, Anna Muylaert, among others.

Because of its educational nature, the production was part of a partnership between Fiesp and TV Cultura, such as other educational programs for children that the station aired. Fiesp, Sesi and Senai were all educational institutions that appeared in its credits. Although the series was targeted towards children from 3 to 8 years old, it actually had an audience of 3 to 16 year olds.

== Plot ==
Nino is a 300-year-old boy who lives with his uncle, Dr. Victor, who is a 3,000-year-old sorcerer and scientist, and his great-aunt Morgana, who is a 6,000-year-old witch. The three live in a castle in the middle of the city of São Paulo. Being a sorcerer's apprentice, Nino never got to go to school, in special due to his unusual age for a boy. His parents left him in the foster care of Victor and Morgana, as they needed to travel on an expedition to outer space, taking his two younger siblings with them. Although he has supernatural animal friends in the castle, Nino misses having friends that are like himself, so he decides to cast a spell he learned from his uncle Victor, which ends up bringing three children who had just left school to his castle's doorstep. Free of loneliness, Nino then receives daily visits from the trio, in addition to special visits from other friends, such as the pizza delivery man Bongo, the flamboyant TV reporter Penelope, the folk legend Caipora, and an alien called Etevaldo. Dr. Abobrinha (Dr. Zucchini, also referring to the Portuguese expression of speaking senseless) serves as the main villain of the series, who is a real estate speculator who wants to demolish the castle and erect a 100-story tall building in its place.

The show also features puppet characters such as Adelaide the magpie, a cobra named Celeste, a duo of monsters named Mau (who strongly resembles Herry Monster from Sesame Street and has a personality reminiscent of Oscar the Grouch) and Godofredo, a cat named Gato Pintado, a robot named Porteiro, and a finger puppet named Fura-Bolos.

== Main characters ==
- Antonino "Nino" Victorius Stradivarius II: Born on December 11, 1692, in San Vicente, Province of Terra de Vera Cruz. Son of Antonino Quântico Stradivarius II and Ninotchka Astrobaldo Stradivarius (Nino uses the number in the name of his father (II) as a way of honoring him). The main character, present in all episodes. Nino's room contains several toys, and its wallpaper is filled with comic book pages. Nino's parents do not appear in the series due to their travels. Their ten-year journey through outer space began in 1990. He has a bowl cut with a single strand standing up. His main outfit is a colorful purple suit, with red, yellow, orange and blue stripes all over. Despite being 300 years old and looking like an adult, Nino is still a child. This is most apparent in his immature behavior. Despite that lack of maturity, he is a well-meaning child who will stand by his friends no matter what.
- Dr. Victor Astrobaldo Stradivarius Victorius: He is Nino's maternal uncle, a powerful sorcerer. A friend of machines, animals and children, he's also an incredibly talented inventor who works for a company of unspecified function (most likely a technology company). Victor acts as a father figure to Nino, and has attempted to enroll him in a school for the past 150 years. When Nino acts stubborn or is lazy with his chores, he will yell out his catchphrase, "Lightning and Thunder!" followed by a thunder strike. Victor is a few millennia old, which gave him the chance to meet historical figures, including having a friendship with Leonardo da Vinci.
- Morgana Astrobaldo Stradivarius Victorius: The great-aunt of Nino, loosely based on Morgana le Fay. She is a powerful sorceress who turned 6,000 years in an episode of the series. Morgana lived long, being found in many major events and passages of history and legend. In the "Witchcraft" block of the show, Morgana imparted knowledge of the many stories she knew, from mystical tales of mythology to historical events such as the construction of the Great Wall of China, or the invention of money. Adelaide the Magpie is her faithful companion and pet. Her room is in the highest tower of the castle. She acts as a mother figure to Nino and is generally more patient than Victor.
- Zequinha: His real name is Zeca. The youngest of the trio, he is 6 years old. Zequinha is small and very curious, to the point of annoyance. At the slightest hint of something he does not understand, he asks "Why?", starting a nearly interminable string of "whys" until someone loses their temper and shouts "Just because, Zequinha!" or variations of it. This marks the beginning the "Why?" block of the program, in which a narrator provides an answer to the question Zequinha asked. In some episodes Zequinha is portrayed as a glutton. His outfit is composed of a colorful beanie, a red and white striped shirt, and a dark blue overalls.
- Biba: Her real name is Beatriz. The oldest of the trio, at 10 years old. She is portrayed as smart, feminine and determined. When she is not poking fun at the boys or acting as the more responsible one of the group, Biba likes to brainstorm ideas with her friends, which tend to either lead to fun adventures, or ends putting both herself, her friends and the castle's inhabitants in bizarre situations. She likes to boast that she is more mature than Pedro because she is a girl, but deep down she has a crush on him. She wears a light dress defined by its pastel yellow, blue and pink stripes.
- Pedro: He is the same age as Biba, at 10 years old. Pedro, as his appearance suggests, is a little more intellectual than his friends. Always coming up with ideas for games or ways to exercise their own creativity, Pedro practically becomes leader of the group when Nino isn't around. Has a crush on Biba, which is shown in a few episodes of the series. He wears a colorful print shirt, a blue top hat, and red glasses, though in many episodes the colors of the hat and glasses are swapped.

== Cast ==
- Cássio Scapin: Nino
- Sérgio Mamberti: Dr. Victor
- Rosi Campos: Morgana
- Cinthya Rachel: Biba
- Luciano Amaral: Pedro
- Freddy Allan: Zequinha

== International Exhibition ==
Country	Television Channel	Title
Brazil	TV Cultura	Castelo Rá-Tim-Bum
Brazil	TV Rá-Tim-Bum	Castelo Rá-Tim-Bum
Portugal	RTP2	Castelo Rá-Tim-Bum
Argentina	Nickelodeon Latinoamérica	Castillo Rá-Tim-Bum
Paraguay	Nickelodeon Latinoamérica	Castillo Rá-Tim-Bum
Venezuela	Nickelodeon Latinoamérica	Castillo Rá-Tim-Bum
Uruguay	Nickelodeon Latinoamérica	Castillo Rá-Tim-Bum
Panama	Nickelodeon Latinoamérica	Castillo Rá-Tim-Bum
Mexico	Nickelodeon Latinoamérica	Castillo Rá-Tim-Bum
Bolivia	Nickelodeon Latinoamérica	Castillo Rá-Tim-Bum
Puerto Rico	Nickelodeon Latinoamérica	Castillo Rá-Tim-Bum
Colombia	Nickelodeon Latinoamérica	Castillo Rá-Tim-Bum
Honduras	Nickelodeon Latinoamérica	Castillo Rá-Tim-Bum
Ecuador	Nickelodeon Latinoamérica	Castillo Rá-Tim-Bum
Chile	Nickelodeon Latinoamérica	Castillo Rá-Tim-Bum
Costa Rica	Nickelodeon Latinoamérica	Castillo Rá-Tim-Bum

== Museum Exhibition ==
In 2014, TV Cultura created a partnership with the Museum of Image and Sound (MIS), in São Paulo, to carry out an exhibition celebrating the 20th anniversary of the show's debut. The exhibition included the re-creation of all the castle's sceneries and objects as faithfully as possible - including the central tree - and the display of the original dolls, official costumes, photographs, reports and a full visual interactive experience, where visitors could sit and, using headphones, watch interviews of the characters and production about the project. The exhibition was a big success, being reopened in 2017.
