= Uma Rosa com Amor =

- Genre: Telenovela
- Created by: Vicente Sesso (original work); Tiago Santiago (version 2010)
- Based on: Uma Rosa com Amor by Vicente Sesso
- Starring: Carla Marins; Cláudio Lins; Betty Faria; Mônica Carvalho; Isadora Ribeiro; Toni Garrido; Edney Giovenazzi; Jussara Freire; Carlo Briani; João Acaiabe
- Opening theme: "Oh, Pretty Woman"
- Composer: Roy Orbison
- Country of origin: Brazil
- Original language: Portuguese
- No. of episodes: 145

Production
- Running time: 45 minutes

Original release
- Network: SBT
- Release: March 1 – August 16, 2010

Related
- Uma Rosa com Amor (original series)

Uma Rosa com Amor is a Brazilian telenovela that was produced by SBT and broadcast from 1 March 2010 to 16 August 2010 in 145 chapters. It was written and adapted by James Santiago, inspired in the Vicente Sesso's work of same title, in collaboration with Renata Dias Gomes and Miguel Paiva and the direction by Del Rangel.

It stars Carla Marins, Cláudio Lins, Betty Faria, Mônica Carvalho, Isadora Ribeiro, Edney Giovenazzi, Toni Garrido, Pathy Dejesus, Carlo Briani and Marina Stacciarini in the leading roles.

== Plot ==
Serafina Rose is a simple girl who lives with her parents, Giovanni and Amália, her sister Therese, who is engaged to Miltom, and her brother Dino in a village in São Paulo. She works at Claude's company, a French industrialist who needs a permanent visa to stay in Brazil in order to start a big business with approximately 10 million Americans. Serafina is in love with her boss but he is not aware of it.

Claude has a strange rash. Whenever he hears the word "marriage" he starts to sneeze, cough, hiccup, etc. All residents of the slum are threatened with eviction and need a million dollars to be able to buy it. Claude is engaged to an ambitious woman named Nara and they work together. Serafina and Nara met and argue in a fabric shop but Serafina didn't know that Nara is engaged to Claude.

One day, Claude discovers through his partner and best friend Frazão that he has to marry in order to start business with Americans. One of the Americans who want to trade is Mr. Claude Smith, a successful businessman who met Serafina after she found his wallet and returned it. Claude cannot marry Nara because she is still married to a man who fled and left her with two children (Bob, a reckless boy, and Rachel, a sweet girl who is dating Sérgio, the son of Joanna, who lives in tenement). Sérgio's dream is to become an actor.
