= Cao Hamburger =

Brazilian director, screenwriter, and producer

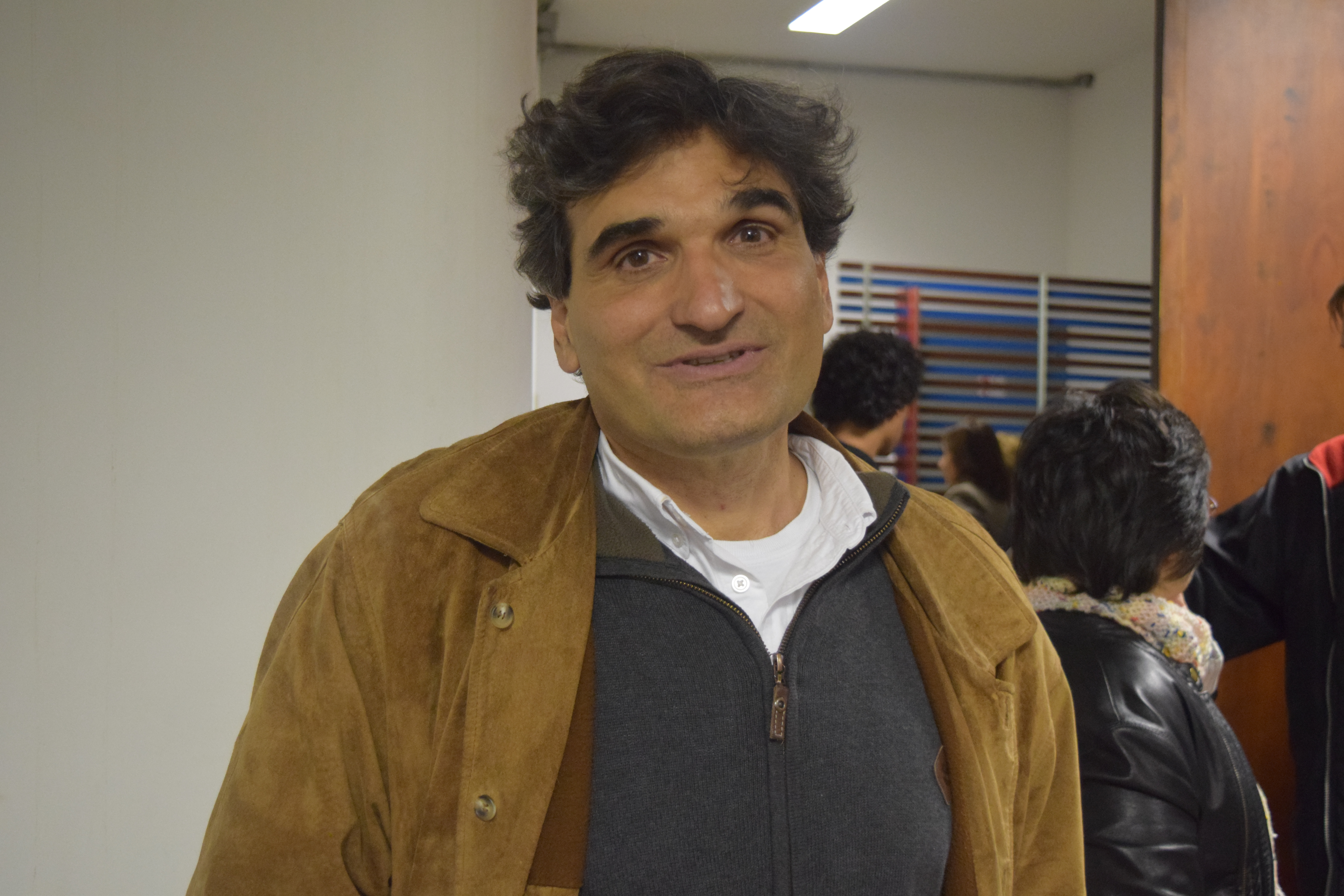
- Hamburger in 2016
- Born: Carlos Império Hamburger; 27 February 1962 (age 63); São Paulo, Brazil
- Occupations: Director; screenwriter; producer
- Years active: 1985–present
- Father: Ernst Wolfgang Hamburger

Carlos Império Hamburger, better known as Cao Hamburger (Portuguese pronunciation: [ˈkaw ɐ̃ˈbuʁɡeʁ]; born 27 February 1962), is a Brazilian film and television director, screenwriter, and producer. He is one of the creators of the Castelo Rá-Tim-Bum series of programs for children in the TV Cultura of São Paulo, along with Flávio de Souza, which gave origin to a successful movie with the same title. Castelo Rá-Tim-Bum was one of the most successful children shows to air in Brazil. He directed in 2006 another successful film, The Year My Parents Went on Vacation, partly based on his childhood memories.

Hamburger was also one of two creative directors for Rio's contribution to the 2012 Summer Olympics opening ceremony. He won twice the International Emmy Kids Awards of best series with the works Pedro & Bianca and Young Hearts: Embrace Diversity, in 2014 and 2019 respectively.

== Biography ==
Hamburger is the son of physicists and University of São Paulo professors Ernst Wolfgang Hamburger, of Jewish-German origin, and Amélia Império Hamburger, of Italian origin. He has three sisters: Sônia, a film producer, Vera, an art director and Esther, a university professor. His brother Fernando is a photographer.

== Filmography ==
=== Film ===
Year	Film	Director	Writer	Producer	Notes
1985	Frankenstein Punk	Yes	No	No	Short film
1986	A Garota das Telas	Yes	Yes	No	Short film
1999	Castelo Rá-Tim-Bum	Yes	Yes	Yes	
2006	The Year My Parents Went on Vacation	Yes	Yes	No	
2012	Xingu	Yes	Yes	No	

=== Television ===
Year	Title	Director	Writer	Producer	Notes
1993	Lucas e Juquinha em Perigo! Perigo! Perigo!	Yes	No	No	
1994–1997	Castelo Rá-Tim-Bum	Yes	Yes	No	
1997–2001	Disney Club	No	Yes	No	
2001–2002	Disney CRUJ	No	Yes	No	
2006	Um Menino Muito Maluquinho	No	Yes	No	
2006, 2009	Sons of Carnival	Yes	Yes	No	
2008–2009	No Estranho Planeta dos Seres Audiovisuais	No	Yes	No	
2012–2013	Família Imperial	Yes	Yes	No	
2012–2014	Pedro & Bianca	Yes	Yes	No	
2014–2015	Que Monstro te Mordeu?	Yes	Yes	Yes	
2017–2018	Young Hearts	No	Yes	No	Season 25; "Embrace Diversity"
2020–present	We Are Five	Yes	Yes	No	Supervising director
