= Mundo da Lua =

Brazilian television series

- Genre: Children's; Fantasy
- Created by: Flávio de Souza
- Directed by: Roberto Vignati
- Starring: Luciano Amaral; Antônio Fagundes; Mira Haar; Mayana Blum; Gianfrancesco Guarnieri; Anna D'Lira
- Country of origin: Brazil
- Original language: Portuguese
- No. of seasons: 1
- No. of episodes: 52

Production
- Production companies: SESI; TV Cultura

Original release
- Network: TV Cultura
- Release: 6 October 1991 – 27 September 1992

Mundo da Lua (World of the Moon) is a Brazilian children's fantasy television series that aired on TV Cultura from 6 October 1991 to 27 September 1992, totalling 52 episodes. It was created by Flávio de Souza and starred Luciano Amaral. It is currently shown on TV Rá-Tim-Bum.

== Plot ==
The series features Lucas Silva e Silva (Luciano Amaral), a ten-year-old boy who lives with his grandparents, parents, sister and maid in a townhouse in São Paulo. His father, Rogério (Antônio Fagundes), is a teacher who works hard, and his mother, Carolina (Mira Haar), works at a boutique. His older sister is called Juliana (Mayana Blum), and the maid is called Rosa (Ana D'Lira). Lucas is given a tape recorder by his grandfather, Orlando (Gianfrancesco Guarnieri), for his birthday. Lucas uses the tape recorder to record his childhood fantasies, which feature prominently in each episode.

== Spin-off ==
In 1993, following on from Mundo da Lua and featuring its main character Lucas, TV Cultura broadcast a five-episode educational series titled Lucas e Juquinha em Perigo! Perigo! Perigo! (Lucas and Juquinha in Danger! Danger! Danger!). The series showed Lucas helping his younger cousin, Juquinha, navigate common household hazards such as medicine, fire and electricity.

== 2020 revival ==
In April 2020, Luciano Amaral created a stand-alone, 'lockdown' episode of Mundo da Lua, with the title "Bem-vindos de Volta ao Mundo da Lua" ("Welcome back to Mundo da Lua"). The episode was released on social media to encourage people to stay at home.

In September 2020, a new episode of Mundo da Lua was created using artificial intelligence.

== Awards ==
In 1992, Mundo da Lua won the APCA award for Best Children's Program.
