= Fundação Padre Anchieta =

Brazilian public broadcasting foundation

Fundação Padre Anchieta Centro Paulista de Rádio e TV Educativas
- Trade name: Fundação Padre Anchieta
- Company type: Public service broadcasting
- Industry: Mass media
- Founded: 26 September 1967; 58 years ago
- Headquarters: São Paulo, Brazil
- Key people: José Roberto Maluf (president)
- Services: Television, radio, online
- Subsidiaries: Cultura Marcas
- Website: fpa.com.br

Father Anchieta Foundation (Portuguese: Fundação Padre Anchieta) is a Brazilian non-profit foundation of the state of São Paulo that develops educational radio and television programs. It was created by the government of the state of São Paulo in 1967 and includes a national educational public television network (TV Cultura or Cultura) launched in 1969, available in all Brazilian states through its 194 affiliates), two radio stations (Rádio Cultura FM and Rádio Cultura Brasil, both broadcasting to Greater São Paulo), two educational TV channels aimed at distance education (TV Educação and Univesp TV, which is available on free-to-air digital TV in São Paulo and nationally by cable and satellite), and the children's TV channel TV Rá-Tim-Bum, available nationally on pay TV.

Father Anchieta Foundation maintains intellectual, political, and administrative autonomy. The foundation is named after Saint Joseph of Anchieta, a Spanish Jesuit missionary who was one of the founders of the city of São Paulo and copatron of Brazil.

== Activities ==
Padre Anchieta Foundation's goal is to offer programming in the public interest, without influence from commercial or governmental interests.

The public resources dedicated to TV Cultura (that is, the gross budget of the Foundation) were R$74.7 million in 2006, but of those R$36.2 million were donated from private industry partners and sponsors. In May 2007, Paulo Markun won an internal election to become Director-President of the foundation, replacing Marcos Mendonça. Markun has worked at TV Cultura since the 1960s, and he ran unopposed. The president of the board of directors is Jorge da Cunha Lima.

== Board of directors ==
The Board of Directors of the Padre Anchieta Foundation is composed of 47 members. Life members of the board, as well as elected members, are appointed largely through the influence of the state of São Paulo. The government's role in the foundation's decision-making process – which goes against its stated principles – has been a topic of criticism.
