= TV Cultura =

Brazilian public television network

- Country: Brazil
- Affiliates: See List of TV Cultura affiliates
- Headquarters: São Paulo, Brazil

Programming
- Picture format: 1080i HDTV (downscaled to 480i for the SD feed)

Ownership
- Owner: Diários Associados (1960–1969); Fundação Padre Anchieta (since 1969)

History
- Launched: 20 September 1960; 66 years ago (original); 15 June 1969; 57 years ago (relaunch)
- Former names: C2 Cultura (1960-1969); TV2 Cultura (1969-1979); Rádio e Televisão Cultura (RTC) (1979-1987); Rede Cultura (1993-2002)

Links
- Website: www.tvcultura.com.br

Availability

Terrestrial
- Digital terrestrial television: 24 UHF (São Paulo)

TV Cultura, or simply Cultura, is a Brazilian non-commercial free-to-air public television network headquartered in São Paulo and a part of Father Anchieta Foundation, a non-profit foundation funded by the São Paulo State Government. It focuses on educational and cultural subjects but also has sports as entertainment options, along focusing on children's programming with animations during the day to prime time.

According to research by the BBC and the British institute Populus, published in 2015, TV Cultura is the second highest quality channel in the world, behind only BBC One.

== History ==
TV Cultura logo between 1992 and 2010.

During the 1950s, a license was granted to Rádio Cultura to operate on channel 11 (TV Gazeta wanted to use channel 2).

TV Cultura was founded in 1960 by Diários Associados and Rede de Emissoras Associadas, who also owned TV Tupi. The station's transmitter was the former one used by TV Tupi São Paulo, which up until August 1960 broadcast on channel 3, and in order to move to the new frequency, Tupi built a new transmitter at Sumaré.

On September 20, 1960, two days after TV Tupi celebrated its tenth anniversary, its "younger sister" was born. TV Cultura became the fifth television station in the city of São Paulo. The station was initially scheduled to launch in the first semester of 1960, but was later delayed to August, September 7 and finally September 20. The launch campaign in local newspapers framed the station as having state-of-the-art equipment for its time, with a strong emphasis on its local output. The station broadcast from 7 pm to 11 pm. Mario Fanucchi created a special illustration featuring the TV Tupi mascot - with the number 4 in his body - feeding the newborn sister, representing channel 2.

The formal launch ceremony was held at 7 pm on September 20, 1960 at the Fasano Winter Garden followed by a special variety show at 9 pm, where artists from the Associadas stations from other states took part.

The following day, TV Cultura presented its normal schedule. Similar to TV Tupi, its offer included news, sports, plays, children's programs, cartoons and feature-length films. The 10 pm newscast Telejornal Pirelli was presented in association with one of its newspapers (Diário da Noite) featuring a wide local, national and international newscast. The press reported its "never-before seen characteristics". Although the station's name alluded to a "cultural" facet, TV Cultura under its administration was a commercial television station, however, educational programming was still present since the outset, starting with English classes and from March 1961, an experimental television learning system. Shortly before the 1964 military coup, it was suggested that TV Cultura should switch to a news format, which included a proposal from Philips to bring equipment, including outside vans, to accommodate its conversion to the new format. Philips rejected the plan.

On April 28, 1965, at the end of ABC Show, a fire broke out at Studio A, the fire later spread to the entire floor where TV Cultura broadcast from, knocking it off the air. By 2 am, the fire was controlled. The possible cause was a short circuit. While there were no victims, the material damage was high. The following day, TV Cultura started broadcasting provisionally from TV Tupi's Studio C at Sumaré.

Instead of returning to the old facilities, TV Cultura decided to build a new facility from scratch in Água Branca.

In 1968, the São Paulo State Government bought TV Cultura from Associadas and subsequently donated the channel to Fundação Padre Anchieta ("Father Anchieta Foundation") in 1969. It is a public TV Station with an Educational and Cultural agenda and receives public investments from the government of São Paulo's state and it claims to have intellectual, political and administrative independence not only for TV Cultura, but also its two affiliated radio broadcasting channels, Rádio Cultura AM and [Rádio Cultura FM.

== Current programming ==
News and current affairs

- Jornal da Cultura
- Jornal da Tarde
- Matéria de Capa
- Opinião
- Repórter Eco
- Metrópolis

Sports

- Cartão Verde
- Novo Basquete Brasil
- IndyCar Series
- UEFA Europa League
- UEFA Europa Conference League

Talk

- Roda Viva
- Provoca

Music shows

- Sr. Brasil
- Cultura Livre
- Ensaio
- Manos e Minas
- Inglês com Música

Reality shows/Game shows

- Talentos
- Prelúdio
- Tá Certo?
- Cultura, O Musical
- Quem Sabe, Sabe! (2013)

Children's programming

- Quintal da Cultura
- PJ Masks
- Bluey
- Peppa Pig
- My Little Pony: Friendship Is Magic
- Turma da Mônica
- Sésamo
- Os Under-Undergrounds
- Bubu and the Little Owls
- Thomas & Friends
- Paper Port (TV series)
- Tromba Trem
- SOS Fada Manu
- Earth to Luna!
- Kid-E-Cats
- Molang
- Boris e Rufus
- Sunny Bunnies
- Shaun the Sheep
- Mia and Me
- Power Rangers Dino Fury
- The Next Step

=== Former programming ===
News and current affairs

- Jornal da Cultura 60 Minutos
- Cultura Meio Dia
- Cultura Noite
- Diário Paulista
- Manhattan Connection
- Vox Populi

Children's programming

- Sítio do Picapau Amarelo (1964–1965)
- Castelo Rá-Tim-Bum
- Rá-Tim-Bum
- Ilha Rá-Tim-Bum
- X-Tudo
- Vila Sésamo
- Bambalalão
- Curumim
- Catavento
- Bambaleão e Silvana
- Mundo da Lua
- Glub Glub
- Um Menino Muito Maluquinho
- A Turma do Pererê
- De Onde Vem?
- Clifford the Big Red Dog
- Jay Jay the Jet Plane
- Pinky Dinky Doo
- Cyberchase
- Arthur
- Seven Little Monsters
- The Country Mouse and the City Mouse Adventures
- Mona the Vampire
- Charlie and Lola
- Little Bear
- Rupert
- Caillou
- Lunar Jim
- The Adventures of Tintim
- Doug
- Babar
- Zoboomafoo
- Faerie Tale Theatre
- Teletubbies
- Miss Spider's Sunny Patch Friends
- Timothy Goes to School
- Viva * Pitágoras
- Harry and His Bucket Full of Dinosaurs
- Jakers! The Adventures of Piggley Winks
- Wonder Pets!
- Dora the Explorer
- The Puzzle Place
- Tots TV
- Kipper
- Big Bag
- As Aventuras de Gui & Estopa

TV Series

- I Dream of Jeannie
- Bewitched
- Father Knows Best
- Mortified
- Beakman's World
- Flight 29 Down

== Broadcasters ==
Between 1980 and 2007, TV Cultura became a strong educational television network, and several educational broadcasters across the country joined the network. In 1998, TVE Brasil, the station owned by the federal government of Brazil in Rio de Janeiro joined TV Cultura and together they formed the Public Television Network, today ABEPEC (translated from Portuguese, the Brazilian Association of Public and Educational Broadcasters). In 2007, with the creation of a public corporation, Brazil Communication Company and the creation of TV Brasil, the partnership with TV Cultura was dissolved, but the partnership was resumed two years later. From 2008 to 2012, more than half of TV Cultura's affiliates left it for TV Brasil, generating a rapid shrinkage of the network. However, the situation was reversed between 2016 and 2019. In 2013, the IBOPE index showcased that TV Cultura had an audience growth in the daily average audience of Greater São Paulo, allowing for its re-expansion. Currently, the station is present in 2,000 municipalities and 27 states, either through partner stations or network relays.

== See also ==
- TVE Brasil
- TV Brasil
