= List of Brazilians by net worth =

The following is a Forbes list of Brazilian billionaires based on an annual assessment of wealth and assets compiled and published by Forbes magazine in April 2023, as well as the real time updates from Forbes website.

== 2026 Brazilian billionaires list ==
Rank	Name	Net worth (USD)	Sources of wealth	Age
1	Eduardo Saverin	$ 35.9 billion	Meta (Facebook) / B Capital	
2	Jorge Paulo Lemann	$ 19.8 billion	AB InBev / 3G Capital	
3	André Esteves	$ 20.2 billion	BTG Pactual	
4	Fernando Roberto Moreira Salles	$ 9.9 billion	Itaú Unibanco / CBMM	
5	Pedro Moreira Salles	$8.7 billion	Itau	72
6	Safra Siblings	$7.1 billion	Safra Group	
7	Alex Behring	$7 billion	3G Capital	53
8	Dulce Pugliese de Godoy Bueno	$6 billion	Amil (former), Dasa, United Health Group	
9	Alceu Elias Feldmann	$5.4 billion	Fertipar	
10	Luiza Helena Trajano	$5.3 billion	Magazine Luiza	72
11	Luis Frias	$4.6 billion	Grupo Folha, Universo Online, PagSeguro	57
12	André Esteves	$4.5 billion	BTG Pactual	53
13	Candido Pinheiro Koren de Lima	$4.4 billion	Grupo Hapvida	
14	Zaffari Family	$4.3 billion	Companhia Zaffari	
15	Maurizio Billi	$3.9 billion	Eurofarma	
15	Camilla de Godoy Bueno Grossi	$3.1 billion	Diagnosticos da America	
16	Pedro de Godoy Bueno	$3 billion	Diagnosticos da America	
17	Joesley Batista	$2.9 billion	JBS SA	48
18	Wesley Batista	$2.9 billion	JBS SA	48
18	Walter Faria	$2.9 billion	Grupo Petropolis	
20	Luciano Hang	$2.7 billion	Havan	58
21	Guilherme Benchimol	$2.6 billion	XP Inc.	
21	Abilio Diniz	$2.6 billion	GPA (company) (former), Carrefour, BRF	84
23	José Luis Cutrale	$2.5 billion	Cutrale, Chiquita Brands International	
23	Pedro Moreira Salles	$2.5 billion	Itau Unibanco, Companhia Brasileira de Metalurgia e Mineração	51
25	Carlos Sanchez	$2.5 billion	EMS S.A.	
25	André Street	$2.5 billion	StoneCo	
27	Eduardo de Pontes	$2.4 billion	StoneCo	
27	Antônio Luiz Seabra	$2.4 billion	Natura, Avon	
29	Liu Ming Chung	$2.3 billion	Nine Dragons Paper	
29	Fernando Roberto Moreira Salles	$2.3 billion	Itau Unibanco, Companhia Brasileira de Metalurgia e Mineração	
29	João Moreira Salles	$2.3 billion	Itau Unibanco, Companhia Brasileira de Metalurgia e Mineração	59
29	Walter Salles	$2.3 billion	Itau Unibanco, Companhia Brasileira de Metalurgia e Mineração	
33	José João Abdalla Filho	$2.2 billion	Banco Clássico, Eletrobras, Cemig	
33	Miguel Krigsner	$2.2 billion	O Boticário	
33	Rubens Menin Teixeira de Souza	$2.2 billion	MRV Engenharia, CNN Brasil	65
36	Julio Bozano	$2.1 billion	Banco Bozano, Azul Brazilian Airlines	
36	Fabricio Garcia	$2.1 billion	Magazine Luiza	
36	Flavia Bittar Garcia Faleiros	$2.1 billion	Magazine Luiza	
36	Giancarlo Moreira Salles	$2.1 billion	Attorney, CFO Itaú Unibanco and largest shareholder in Campari Group, JAB Holding Company	
40	Joao Alves de Queiroz Filho	$1.9 billion	Hyper Pharma	
40	Ermirio Pereira de Moraes	$1.9 billion	Votorantim Group	89
40	Maria Helena de Moraes Scripilliti	$1.9 billion	Votorantim Group	
43	Roberto Irineu Marinho	$1.8 billion	Grupo Globo	73
43	José Roberto Marinho	$1.8 billion	Grupo Globo	65
43	João Roberto Marinho	$1.8 billion	Grupo Globo	68
43	Jorge Pinheiro Koren de Lima	$1.8 billion	Hapvida	
43	Candido Pinheiro Koren de Lima	$1.8 billion	Hapvida	
48	David Feffer	$1.7 billion	Grupo Suzano	
49	Daniel Feffer	$1.6 billion	Grupo Suzano	
49	Ruben Feffer	$1.6 billion	Grupo Suzano	
49	Jorge Feffer	$1.6 billion	Grupo Suzano	
49	Alfredo Egydio Arruda Villela Filho	$1.6 billion	Itau Unibanco	
49	Alexandre Grendene Bartelle	$1.6 billion	Grendene	
49	Rubens Ometto Silveira Mello	$1.6 billion	Cosan	
55	Lirio Parisotto	$1.5 billion	Videolar	
55	Fernando Trajano	$1.5 billion	Magazine Luiza	
57	Samuel Barata	$1.4 billion	Drogaria Sao Paulo	28
57	Ana Lucia de Mattos Barreto Villela	$1.4 billion	Itau Unibanco	
57	Jayme Garfinkel	$1.4 billion	Porto Seguro S.A.	74
57	Guilherme Peirão Leal	$1.4 billion	Natura, Avon	
57	Ilson Mateus	$1.4 billion	Grupo Mateus	
57	Gisele Trajano	$1.4 billion	Magazine Luiza	
64	Julio Mario Santo Domingo Jr. Deyverson Jose W S D Vera Rechulski Santo Domingo	$1.1 billion	Santo Domingo Group	
64	Anne Werninghaus	$1.1 billion	WEG Industries	
66	Maria Pinheiro	$1 billion	Grupo Mateus	

== See also ==
- List of wealthiest families
