= International Emmy Directorate Award =

Annual award

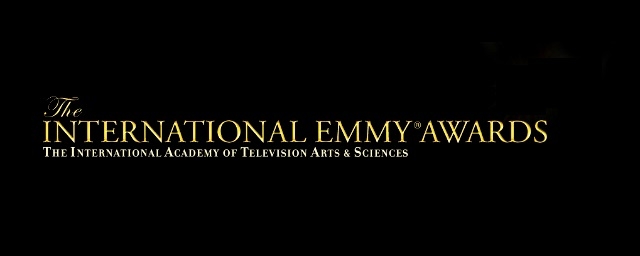
- Country: United States
- Presented by: International Academy of Television Arts and Sciences
- First award: Charles Curran; UK (1973)
- Currently held by: João Roberto Marinho; Brazil (2025)
- Website: www.iemmys.tv

The International Emmy Directorate Award is presented by the International Academy of Television Arts and Sciences and honors individuals or organizations for their outstanding contribution to international television. The awards ceremony has taken place annually in New York City since 1973.

== Winners ==
Year	Winner	Country	Note
1973	Charles Curran	United Kingdom	President, European Broadcasting Union, Director General, BBC
1974	Dr. Joseph Charyk	United States	President, COMSAT
1975	Junzo Imamichi	Japan	Chairman of the Board, Tokyo Broadcasting System
1976	Talbot S. Duckmanton	Australia	President, Asian Broadcasting Union, CBE (Citation)
1976	Roberto Marinho	Brazil	President, TV Globo Network of Brazil (Citation)
1976	Howard Thomas	United Kingdom	Chairman of the Board, Thames Television, (Citation)
1977	Alphonse Ouimet	Canada	Chairman, Telesat, Canadian TV
1979	Frank Stanton	United States	President Emeritus, CBS, Incorporated 1978 Prix Italia
1980	Lew Grade	United Kingdom	Chairman of the Board, Associated Communications Corp.
1981	Sir Huw Wheldon	United Kingdom	Retired (1976) Managing Director of BBC-TV
1982	Akio Morita	Japan	Chairman and CEO, Sony Corporation
1983	Roberto Marinho	Brazil	President, TV Globo Network of Brazil
1984	Sydney Bernstein	United Kingdom	Founder, Granada Television
1985	Leonard H. Goldenson	United States	Chairman and CEO, ABC
1986	Herbert Schmertz	United States	Vice President, Public Affairs, Mobil Oil Company
1987	Jeremy Isaacs	United Kingdom	Chief Executive, Channel 4
1988	Vittorio Boni	Italy	Director, International Relations, RAI (Posthumously)
1989	Ted Turner	United States	Chairman of the Board/President, Turner Broadcasting System (Citation)
1989	Murray Chercover	Canada	Chairman and CEO, CTV Television Network
1990	Henrikas Juškevičius	Lithuania	Assistant Director-General, UNESCO
1991	Henry Becton	United States	President, WGBH, Boston
1992	Silvio Berlusconi	Italy	President, Fininvest Gruppo
1993	André Rousselet	France	Chairman, Canal Plus
1994	Helmut Thoma	Germany	Managing Director, RTL
1995	John Birt	United Kingdom	Director General, BBC
1996	Herbert A. Granath	United States	Chairman, ABC/Disney Cable International
1997	Dieter Stolte	Germany	Intendant, ZDF
1998	Sam Nilsson	Sweden	President, Sveriges Television
1999	Ralph Baruch	United States	Founder, Viacom
2000	Su-Ming Cheng	China	CEO China-TV, Taiwan
2001	Gustavo Cisneros	Venezuela	Chairman, Organizacion Cisneros
2002	Katsuji Ebisawa	Japan	President, NHK
2003	Greg Dyke	United Kingdom	Director General, BBC
2004	Herbert Kloiber	Germany	Managing Director, Tele-München Group
2005	Charles Allen	United Kingdom	Chief Executive, ITV
2006	Ronald S. Lauder	United States	Founder and Chairman, Central European Media Enterprises (CME)
2007	Patrick Le Lay	France	Chairman, TF1 Group
2008	Liu Changle	Hong Kong	Chairman & CEO, Phoenix Satellite Television
2009	Markus Schächter	Germany	Director General, ZDF
2010	Lorne Michaels	United States	Creator & Executive Producer, Saturday Night Live
2011	Subhash Chandra	India	Chairman, Zee TV
2012	Kim In-Kyu	South Korea	President & CEO, Korean Broadcasting System
2013	Anke Schäferkordt	Germany	CEO Mediengruppe RTL Deutschland & CO-CEO RTL Group
2014	Roberto Irineu Marinho	Brazil	Chairman & CEO of Grupo Globo
2015	Richard Plepler	United States	Chairman & CEO, HBO
2016	Maria Rørbye Rønn	Denmark	CEO & Director General, DR
2017	Emilio Azcárraga Jean	Mexico	Chairman & CEO, Grupo Televisa
2018	Sophie Turner Laing	United Kingdom	Chief executive officer of Endemol Shine Group
2019	Christiane Amanpour	United States	Chief international anchor for CNN
2020	None	None	None
2021	Thomas Bellut	Germany	Director General of German national broadcaster ZDF
2022	Miky Lee	United States	Vice president of CJ Group
2023	Ekta Kapoor	India	Managing director of Balaji Telefilms
2024	Sidonie Dumas	France	CEO of Gaumont
2025	João Roberto Marinho	Brazil	CEO of Grupo Globo
