= Museum of the Portuguese Language =

- Museu da Língua Portuguesa
- Established: 20 March 2006
- Location: Estação da Luz, São Paulo, Brazil
- Coordinates: 23°32′6.12″S 46°38′11.82″W
- Type: Language museum
- Visitors: 580.000 (2006)
- Director: Antonio Sartini
- Curator: João Manuel Rendeiro
- Public transit access: Luz; Luz
- Website: museudalinguaportuguesa.org.br

The Museum of the Portuguese Language (Portuguese: Museu da Língua Portuguesa, [muˈzew dɐ ˈlĩɡwɐ poʁtuˈɡezɐ]) is an interactive Portuguese language—and Linguistics/Language Development in general—museum in São Paulo, Brazil. It is housed in the Estação da Luz railway station, in the urban district of the same name. Three hundred thousand passengers arrive and leave the station every day, and the choice of the building for the launching of the museum is connected to the fact that it was mainly here that thousands of non-Portuguese speaking immigrants arriving from Europe and Asia into São Paulo via the Port of Santos got acquainted with the language for the first time. The idea of a museum-monument to the language was conceived by the São Paulo Secretary of Culture in conjunction with the Roberto Marinho Foundation, at a cost of around 37 million reais.

The objective of the museum is to create a living representation of the Portuguese language, where visitors may be surprised and educated by unusual and unfamiliar aspects of their own native language. Secondly, the caretakers of the museum, as expressed on the official website, "desire that, in this museum, the public has access to new knowledge and reflection in an intense and pleasurable manner," as it notices the relationship of the language with others, as well as its proto-languages. The museum targets the Portuguese speaking population, made up of peoples from many regions and social backgrounds, but who still have not had the opportunity to gain a broader understanding of the origins, the history and the continuous evolution of the language.

== History ==
=== Development ===
The project was conceived in 2001. It is speculated by many sources that São Paulo was chosen as the site of the museum for its symbolism, as it is the largest Portuguese-speaking city and metropolitan region in the world, with 20 million inhabitants.

Among the partners in the project were Gilberto Gil, IBM Brazil, the Brazilian Postal Service, Rede Globo, Petrobras, Vivo, AES Eletropaulo, Grupo Votorantim and BNDES. Also supporting the effort were the Calouste Gulbenkian Foundation, the Community of Portuguese Language Countries, the mayorship of São Paulo, the CPTM, the Otis Elevator Company, Carrier and the Luso-Brazilian Foundation.

The idea of a Portuguese Language museum came from Ralph Appelbaum, who also developed the United States Holocaust Memorial Museum in Washington D.C., and the fossil room of the American Museum of Natural History in New York City. The architectural project was undertaken by Brazilian father-son duo Paulo and Pedro Mendes da Rocha. The director of the museum is sociologist Isa Grinspun Ferraz, who coordinated a team of thirty Portuguese language specialists to implement the museum. The artistic director is Marcello Dantas.

=== Opening ceremony ===
The museum was dedicated on Monday, 20 March 2006, with the presence of the Minister of Culture and singer Gilberto Gil, representing the Brazilian president Luiz Inácio Lula da Silva. Also present were the Minister of Culture of Portugal, Isabel Pires de Lima, the governor of São Paulo, Geraldo Alckmin, former President Fernando Henrique Cardoso, the mayor of Lisbon António Carmona Rodrigues, the Minister of Foreign Affairs of Guinea-Bissau António Isaac Monteiro, the President of the Calouste Gulbenkian Foundation, and other representative authorities from all Portuguese-speaking nations. Gilberto Gil spoke during the ceremony:

The language speaks for you. The purpose of studying and interacting with a language in a museum, cultural and exchange programs, orthographic agreements, and the development of new words show how important it is. The language is our mother. This museum covers most, if not all, the aspects of the written and spoken language, of the dynamic language, the language of interaction, the language of affection, the language of gestures and of any other aspects that this museum was meant to promote.

Sílvia Finguerut, director of Patrimony and the Environment for the Roberto Marinho foundation, claimed that there didn't exist a museum in the world dedicated solely to a language. Finguerut noted the symbolism of the museum's location in the Estação da Luz:

During many decades, the foreign immigrants who were reaching São Paulo were disembarking in this station, a place where other languages were meeting with our Portuguese.

Geraldo Alckmin alluded to the importance of the museum to the Portuguese-speaking community, to the students, the professors, and to the preservation of the language itself.

This shows again the important role of Brazil in the picture of the development of the Portuguese language. It is an extraordinary initiative for the reinforcement of the solidarity between the peoples who speak Portuguese.

José Roberto Marinho finished the ceremony:

It is fundamental that people communicate. It is necessary to know the language to go deeper into several subjects. And in this space, we find the means of directing people to the study of, and the interest for the language and also of having an intersection of the academic world with daily life.

The following day, 21 March, the doors of the museum were opened to the public.

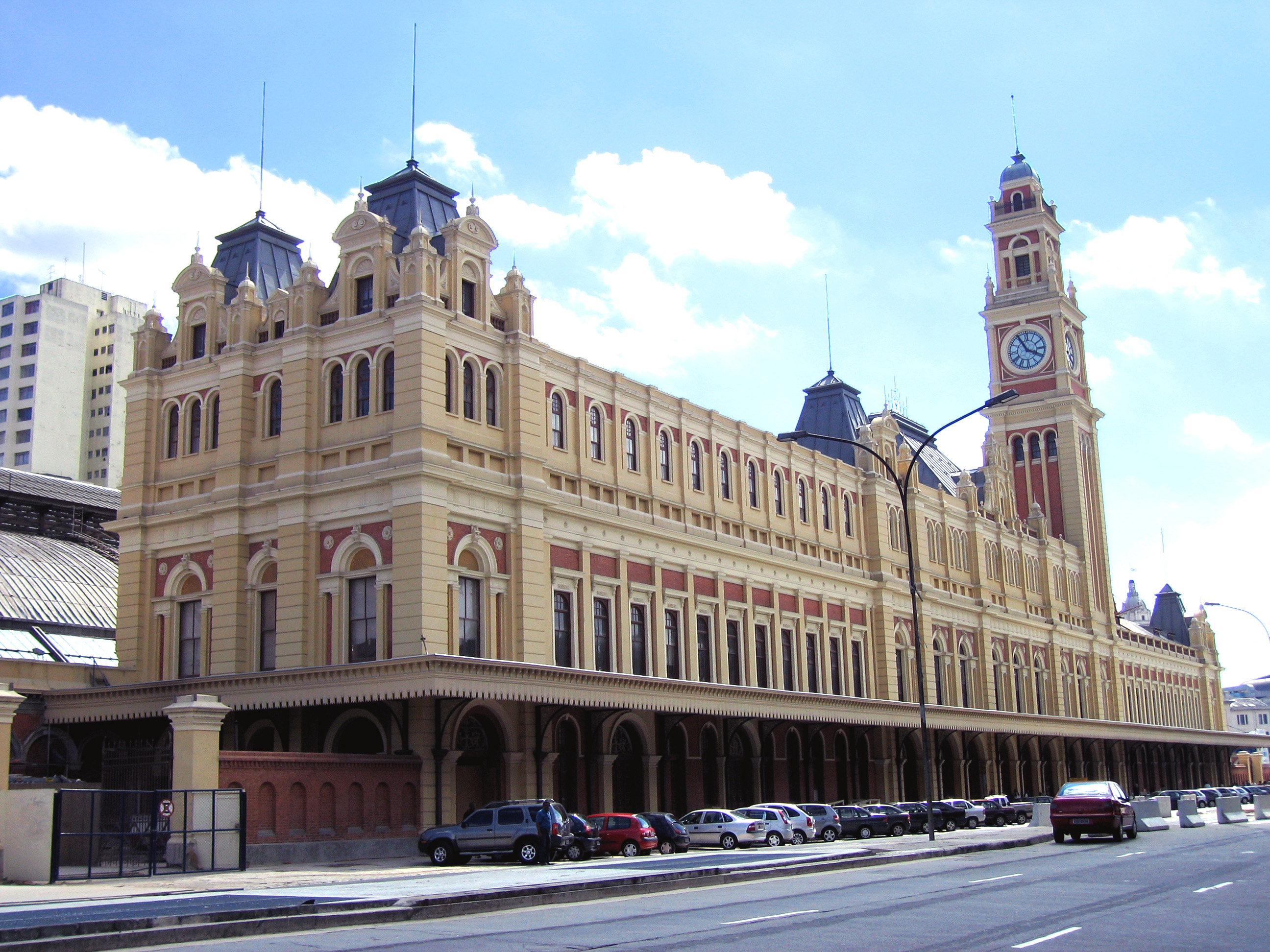
The Estação da Luz, the building housing the museum.

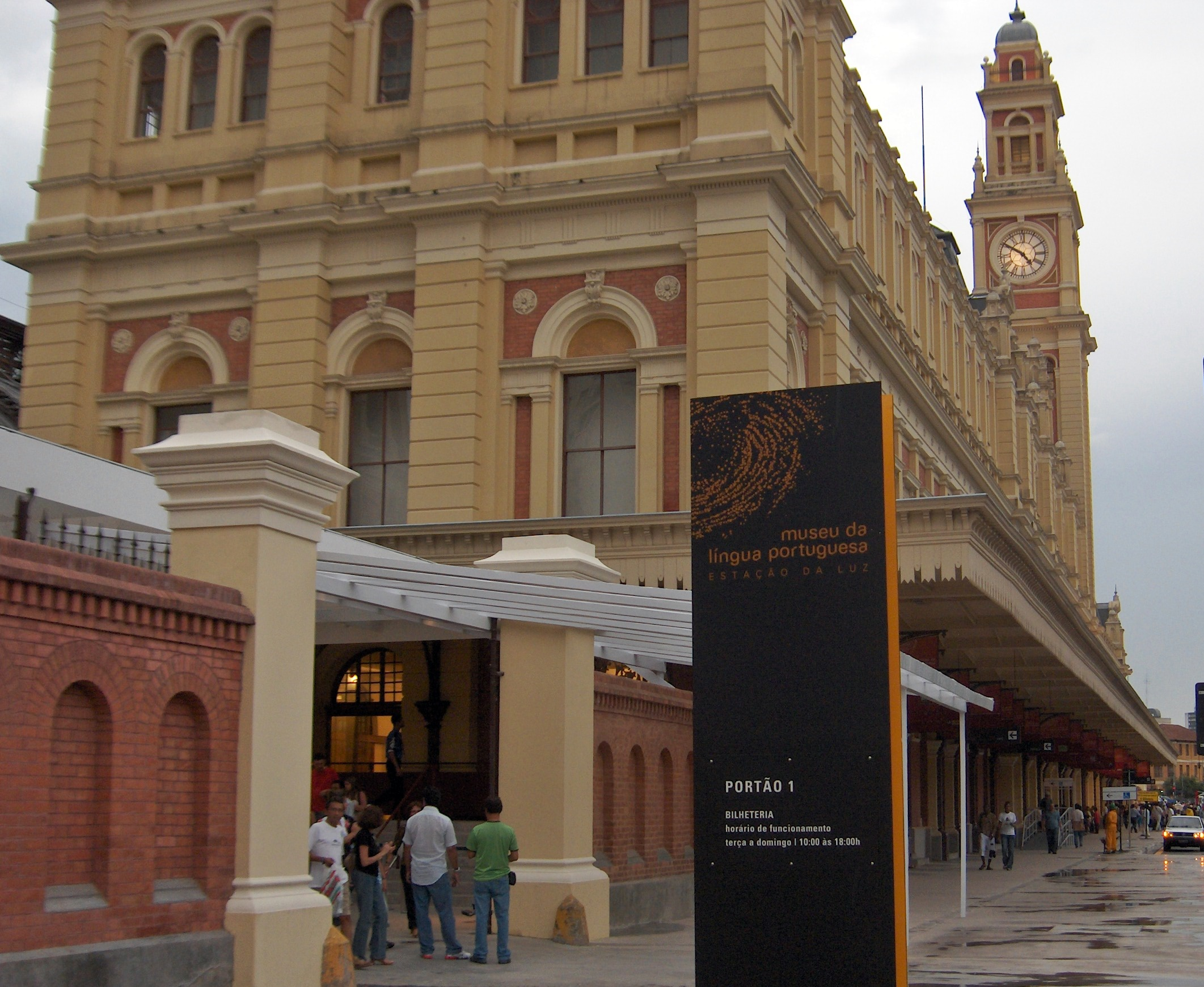
The entrance to the museum.

=== 2015 fire ===
On December 21, 2015, a major fire broke out at the museum, damaging the building and killing one firefighter by smoke inhalation. The installations were restored and the museum opened again on March 12, 2020.

== Museum ==
The museum itself features innovative and predominantly virtual exhibits which feature a mixture of art, technology and interactivity, while keeping in mind the historical building the museum is housed in. It consists of diverse exhibitions with hands-on activities, videos, sounds and images about Linguistics and Portuguese language developments.

== Floors ==
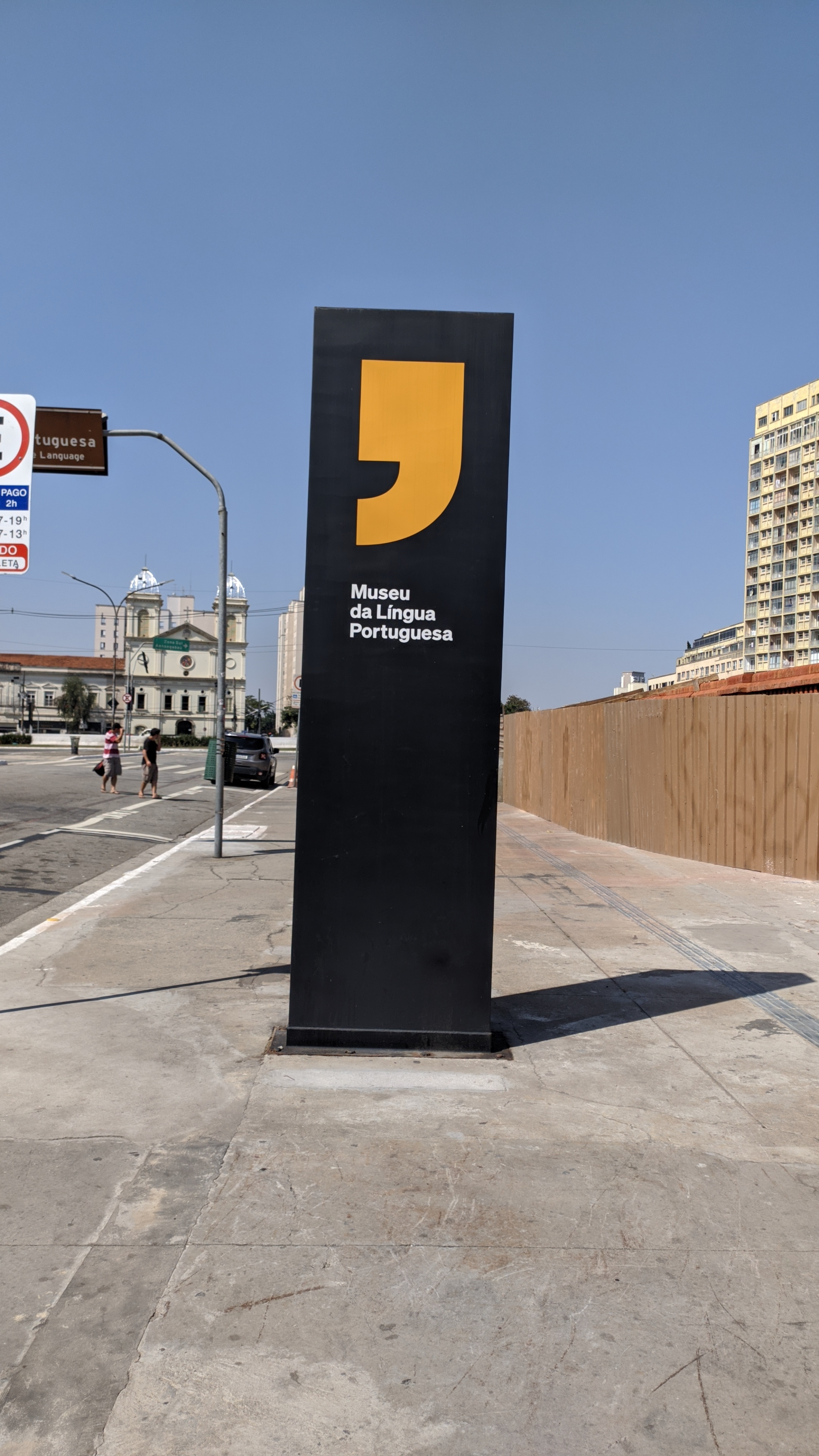
Plaque of the museum at the entrance

The exhibitions were curated by Isa Grinspum Ferraz and Hugo Barreto.

=== Entrance ===
The entrance is located at door A of the Luz Station, in front of the Pinacoteca do Estado de São Paulo. The ticket office, café, store, and museum administration are all located at the entrance of the building.

=== First floor ===
The first floor is where the museum's temporary exhibitions are located, the Paulo Freire Educational Space, and also another space of the museum's administration.

=== Second floor ===
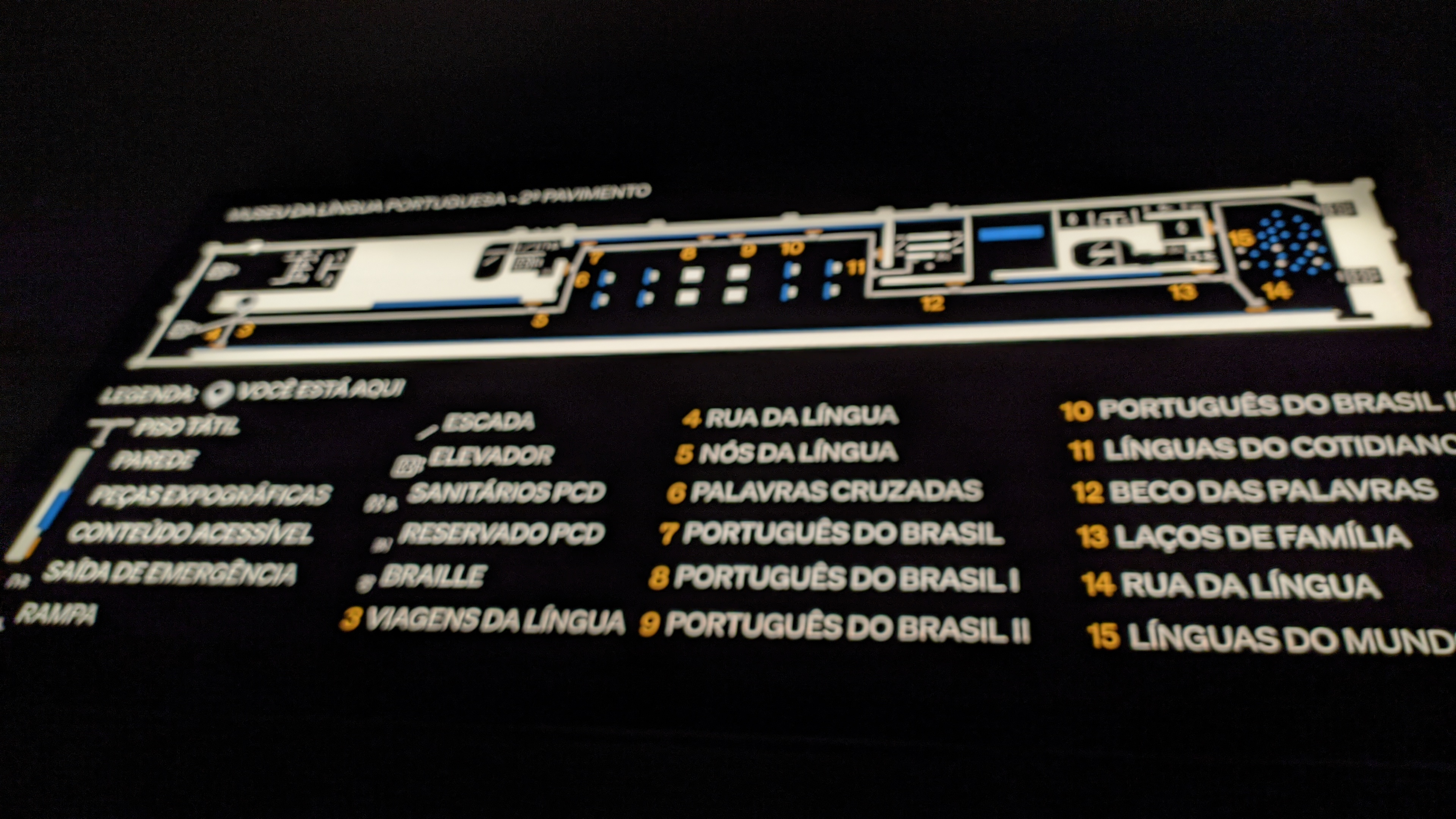
Second floor map

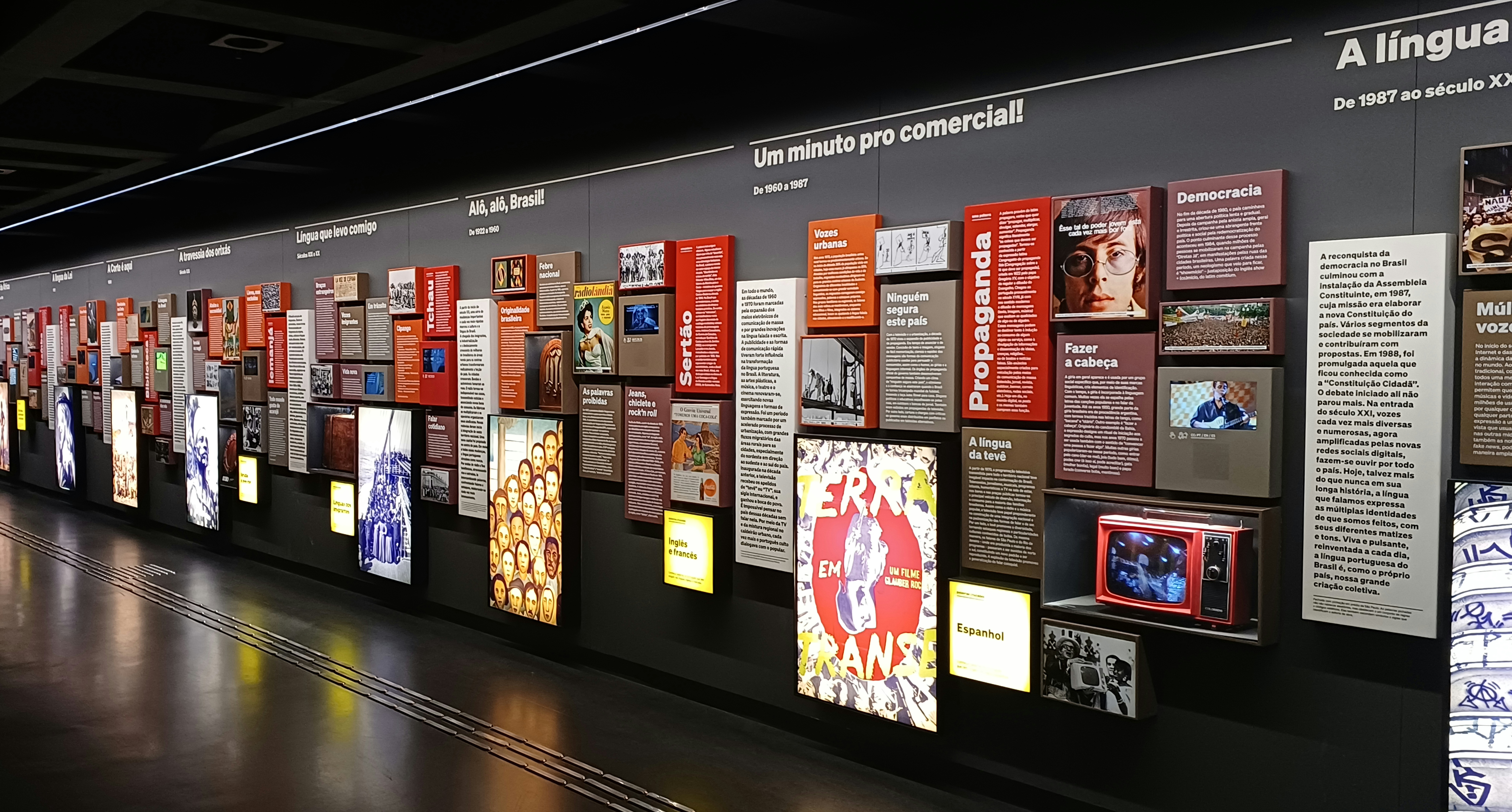
Museum interior

The exhibition "Línguas do mundo" exhibit is where visitors can hear the various languages spoken by people, highlighting 23 different languages.

The exhibition "Rua da Língua" is a 100-meter long screen, covering much of the second floor wall. Words, texts, images and drawings are projected.

The exhibition "Nós da Língua", 23 screens are displayed, with the names of the countries that speak the Portuguese language near these screens. Some of the screens are interactive.

The exhibition "Laços de família" shows how the Portuguese language came about, going from Indo-European and Latin to languages such as Portuguese, Spanish and Galician.

The exhibition "Português do Brasil" shows the evolution of the Portuguese language from its historical origin from Latin during the conquest of the Romans of the Iberian region to the influences of the current media, such as television and social networks. Some of the screens are text, others are images, and in some cases there are interactive screens with short videos explaining the topic covered in that section of the exhibit.

The "Palavras-cruzadas" exhibit has eight interactive totems. This exhibit is complementary to the "Brazilian Portuguese" exhibit.

"Línguas do cotidiano" is a small auditorium. There is a projector that plays 8 different movies.

"Beco das palavras" involves the use of three interactive screens. Each screen has different words on it. With correct interaction, the words are unified and create a new word with a new meaning.

=== Third floor and Deck ===
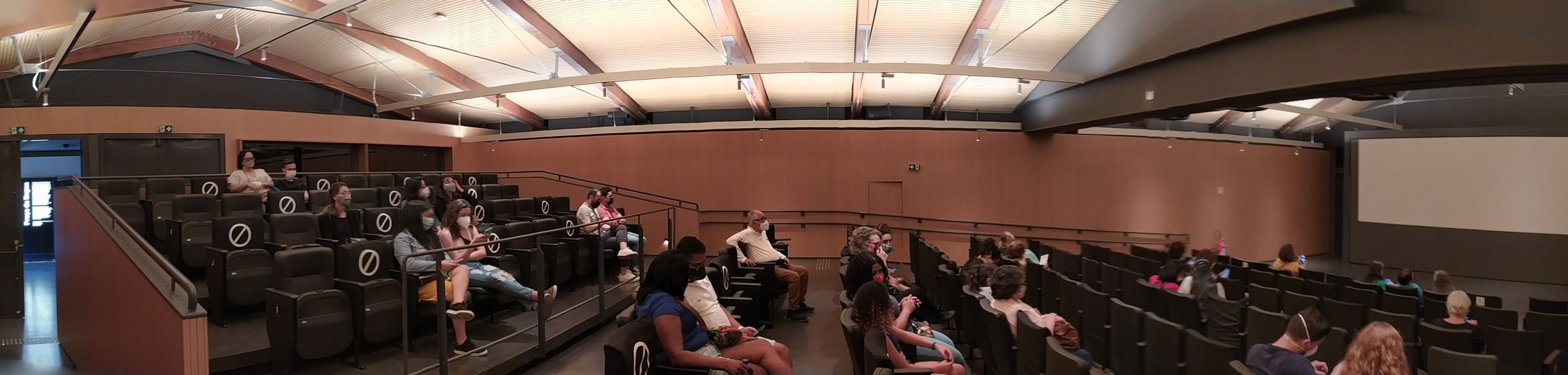
Auditorium in the third floor of the museum

The third floor is also called "Língua viva".

The exhibition "Falares" shows the diversity of the Portuguese language in its accents, vocabulary, among other factors that change the way of expressing oneself from Portuguese..

"O que pode a língua" is an auditorium. The auditorium is used to show films and poetry.

At the end of the exhibition in the auditorium, visitors are invited to go to the terrace, having a privileged view of the Luz station clock tower and the Luz Garden.

== In popular culture ==
The Brazilian television channel TV Globo used part of the museum grounds for their show Retrospectiva, which usually airs on the last Friday of each year. However, it broadcast much earlier than planned, on Monday, 27 December 2021.

== See also ==
- Museum
- Portuguese language
- Lusophony Games
- Estação da Luz
- Instituto Camões
