= Seabra (surname) =

Seabra is a Portuguese surname. Notable people with the surname include:

- Antero Frederico de Seabra (1874–1952), Portuguese naturalist
- António Luís de Seabra, 1st Viscount of Seabra (1798–1895), Portuguese magistrate and politician
- Antônio Luiz Seabra, Brazilian billionaire businessman
- Augusto M. Seabra, Portuguese film critic
- Jose Luiz Seabra (born 1974), Brazilian-born Trinidad and Tobago football defender
- Manuel de Seabra (1932–2017), Portuguese writer, journalist, translator
- Maria do Carmo Seabra (born 1955), Portuguese politician
- Renato Seabra (born 1978), Brazilian cyclist
- Renato Seabra, Portuguese former model and convicted murderer
- Roberto Seabra (born 1976), Brazilian water polo player
- Ruy Seabra (born 1947), Portuguese lawyer and football manager
- Daniel R. Seabra (born 1981), Portuguese Comedian
- Vasco Seabra (born 1983), Portuguese football manager
- Veríssimo Correia Seabra (1947–2004), Guinea-Bissau general
- Zita Seabra (born 1949), Portuguese politician
