= Muti Randolph =

Brazilian architect and designer

- Occupations: architect; designer; artist

Muti Randolph is a Brazilian architect, designer, and artist.

Randolph was a student of Visual Communications and Industrial Design at the Pontifícia Universidade Católica do Rio de Janeiro.

In 1996 he designed the São Paulo nightclub U Turn. In 2011 Randolph was responsible, in tandem with the architects Marcelo Pontes, Paula Zemel, and Eduardo Chalabi, for the redesign (from the original vision of the Franco- Brazilian firm of Triptyque) of the D-Edge electronic music club in the Barra Funda neighborhood of São Paulo.

For the Nike effort at the 2016 Summer Olympics in Rio de Janeiro, "Rio Sem Limites" (Rio Without Limits), Randolph did "A 100-square-meter cube of multiple moving screens" which displayed.. "colorful graphic projections".

He has designed retail locations of Melissa Shoes, a division of Grendene. Randolph's "entry sequence" for the Melissa Shoes' SoHo, New York City store has been described by "Interior Design" as a "veritable tunnel of crisscrossing LEDs surrounded by mirrors".
