= Holocaust Museum in Curitiba =

- Museu do Holocausto de Curitiba
- Location in Brazil
- Established: November 20th, 2011
- Location: Rua Coronel Agostinho Macedo, 248 Curitiba, Paraná, Brazil
- Coordinates: 25.415372°S 49.272678°W
- Type: Holocaust museum
- Visitors: 15 000 (2012)
- Website: www.museudoholocausto.org.br

The Holocaust Museum in Curitiba (Portuguese: Museu do Holocausto de Curitiba) is a museum situated in the city of Curitiba, capital of the Brazilian state of Paraná.

It was the first of that theme in Brazil, aiming to keep alive the memory of the Holocaust through the memory of its victims and its survivors.

Conceived by the Associação Casa de Cultura Beit Yaacov, the museum was raised at an area of about 400 square meters, next to the Centro Israelita do Paraná, at the building of the new synagogue Beit Yaacov, at the center of Curitiba.

The visitation schedule is arranged in advance. Tour guides are available free of charge. Audiovisual resources are used to tell some of the history that led to the Holocaust and its impact and consequences on the Jewish People. A full list of the names of the Righteous Among the Nations is also in display.

The museum was conceived by Miguel Krigsner, president of the Associação Casa de Cultura Beit Yaacov and founder of the Brazilian cosmetics group O Boticário, in partnership with Base7 Projetos Culturais.

Historical research took place between November 2009 and 2011. Execution began in March 2011. Contributors of audiovisual material include several Brazilian and foreign institutions interested in the preservation of the memory, education and research connected to the Holocaust, among them Yad Vashem; the United States Holocaust Memorial Museum in Washington, DC; the USC Shoah Foundation Institute for Visual History and Education; the Auschwitz-Birkenau State Museum; Majdanek; the Mémorial de la Shoah in Paris, France; and the Cultural Institute Soto Delatorre.

Present at the official inauguration ceremony on November 20, 2011, were the Brazilian Secretary for Human Rights Maria do Rosário; Paraná's governor, Beto Richa; Israel's ambassador, Rafael Eldad; and Mayor Luciano Ducci. About 800 people participated of the ceremony, including also Israel's consul general for São Paulo, Ilan Sztulman; former governor Jaime Lerner; Claudio Lottenberg, the head of the Confederação Israelita do Brasil (CONIB); the president of the Israelite Federation in Paraná, Manoel Knophfolz; the Archbishop of Curitiba, Moacyr José Vitti; and survivors and descendants of survivors from the holocaust such as Ben Abraham and George Legmann.
