= São Sebastião do Caí =

Municipality of Rio Grande do Sul, Brazil

- Municipality
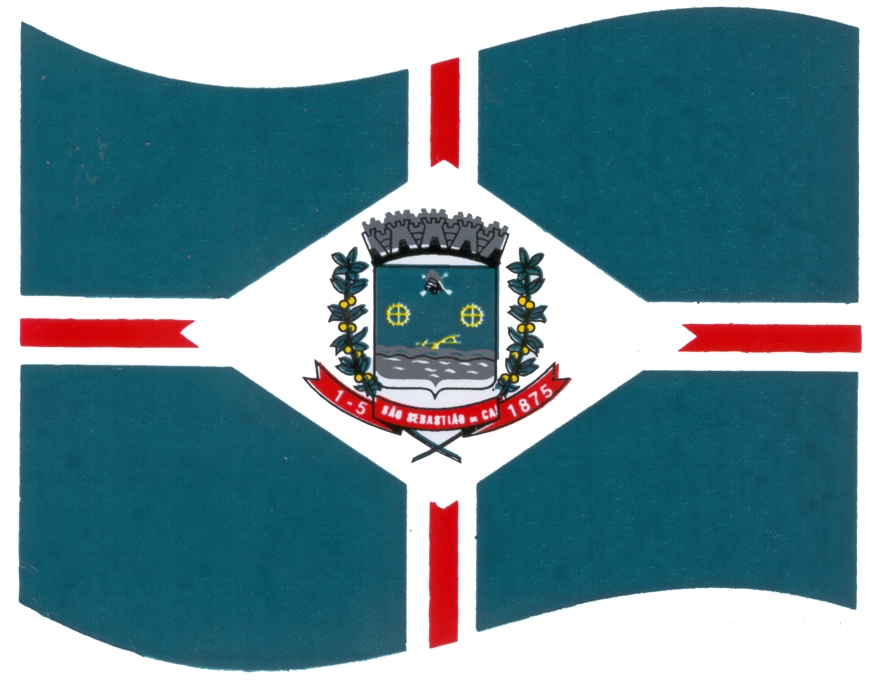
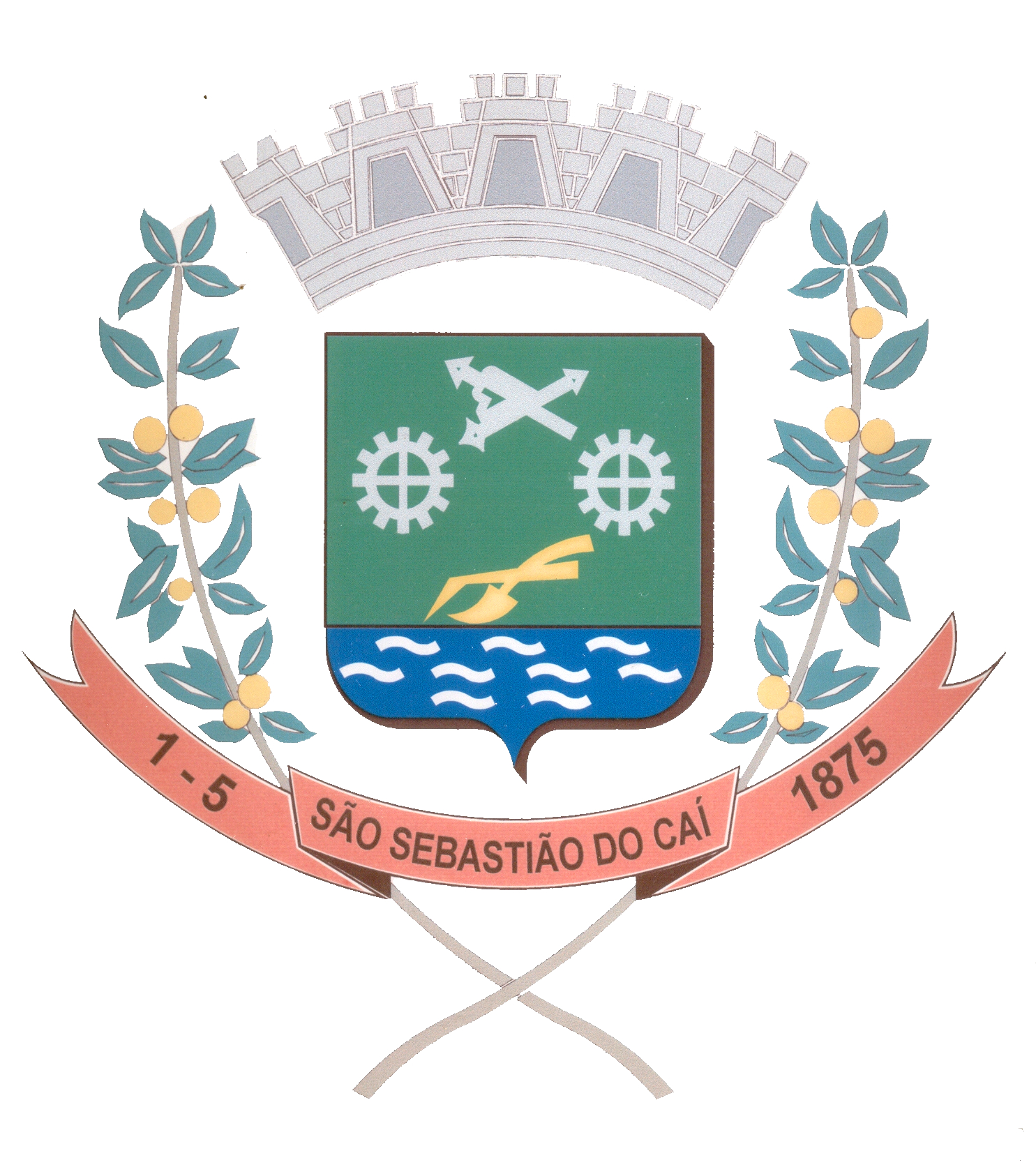
- Flag Coat of arms

- Location within Rio Grande do Sul

- Location in Brazil
- Coordinates: 29°35′13″S 51°22′33″W
- Country: Brazil
- State: Rio Grande do Sul
- Founded: May 1, 1875

Government
  - Mayor: Julio Campani ((PSDB))

Area
  - Total: 111.452 km^{2} (43.032 sq mi)

Population (2020)
  - Total: 25,959
  - Density: 232.92/km^{2} (603.25/sq mi)
- Time zone: UTC−3 (BRT)
- Postal code: 95760-000
- Area/distance code: 51
- Website: http://www.saosebastiaodocai.com/

São Sebastião do Caí is a city near Porto Alegre in the Brazilian state of Rio Grande do Sul. It has a population of about 25,000 inhabitants. The principal university is the University of Caxias do Sul, often abbreviated as UCS. Through the middle of the city runs the river Caí, whose source is in the mountains of São Francisco de Paula, and which empties into Guaíba Lake. The city was founded on May 1, 1875. Like many towns in the state which were settled by German-speaking Europeans in the 19th century, the German language is still present in daily family and community life, if not as much in the public sphere since World War II.

== See also ==
- List of municipalities in Rio Grande do Sul
- German-Brazilian
- Riograndenser Hunsrückisch
