= Alexandre Grendene Bartelle =

Brazilian businessman and billionaire (born 1950)

- Born: 23 January 1950 (age 76); Farroupilha, Rio Grande do Sul, Brazil
- Education: University of Caxias do Sul
- Occupation: Businessman
- Known for: Co-founder of Grendene
- Relatives: Pedro Grendene Bartelle (twin brother)

Alexandre Grendene Bartelle (born January 2, 1950) is a Brazilian businessman and billionaire. In 1971, co-founded sandal manufacturer Grendene with his brother, Pedro Grendene Bartelle. According to Forbes, he was worth US$1.86 billion as of May 2016.

== Biography ==
=== Early life and education ===
Bartelle was born in Farroupilha, Rio Grande do Sul. He studied at Universidade de Caxias do Sul, graduating with a bachelor's degree in Law.

=== Personal life ===
He currently lives in Porto Alegre and has seven children. In 2015, he donated funds for the construction of a veterinary hospital in Porto Alegre. He owns an Amels Limited Editions 199 yacht and a Falcon 7X jet.

== Career ==
In 1971, Alexandre and Pedro co-founded Grendene. Their grandfather lent them capital to purchase plastic injection molding machines and hire five employees. By May 2016, he was worth US$1.86billion.
