= Leon Feffer =

Brazilian businessman

- Born: November 27, 1902; Ukraine
- Died: 7 February 1999 (age 96)
- Citizenship: Brazil
- Occupation: Businessman
- Known for: Founder of Suzano Papel e Celulose
- Spouse: Antonietta Teperman
- Children: 2 including Max Feffer
- Parent(s): Bertha Brandes Feffer; Simpson Feffer
- Family: David Feffer (grandson)

Leon Feffer (1902–1999) was a Brazilian businessman who founded Suzano Papel e Celulose.

== Biography ==
Feffer was born on November 27, 1902, to a Ukrainian Jewish family in Rovno, Ukraine (other sources say Kolki, Ukraine), the son of Bertha (née Brandes) and Simpson Feffer. In 1910, concerned about increasing anti-Semitism, his father immigrated to Brazil where he worked as a peddler selling stationery items around São Paulo and Mato Grosso from his ox-drawn cart. In 1920, his father had saved enough money to bring his wife, two sons (Leon and David) and two daughters (Maria and Regina) to Brazil. Leon started his first business manufacturing candles although it was not successful as Sao Paulo already had electricity. On June 15, 1923, he founded a paper distribution business purchasing imported and domestic paper for sale to local retailers. By chance, a large domestic paper factory suffered a fire and he was able to purchase a large quantity of paper rolls (damaged externally but near perfect internally) which enabled him to profit greatly during the Great Depression after Brazil banned imports. He expanded by purchasing a printing press, established a retail store, and constructed an envelope factory (which became one of the largest in the country). In 1939, he sold everything (including his house, his wife's jewelry, and his store) and completed a paper factory in 1941 in the São Paulo neighborhood of Ipiranga. The factory used imported pine pulp to produce its paper. In 1946, the company was named Indústria de Papel Leon Feffer (IPLF). He encouraged his son Max, who was studying at the Juilliard School of Music, to help him find a local substitute for pine fiber. Max, working with biologists at the University of Florida, determined that eucalyptus pulp was a good substitute for pine pulp. In 1946, he purchased Indústria de Papel Euclides Damiani and he gradually mixed eucalyptus fiber into its production. In 1956, he renamed the company Suzano Papel e Celulose. In 1960, he purchased another paper mill, Indústria de Papel Rio Verde. In 1961, he was using 100% eucalyptus as a raw material. The rest of the paper industry adopted the use of eucalyptus and Brazil shifted from a net importer of cellulose to a net exporter of cellulose. Under his tutelage, Suzano became the second largest integrated paper manufacturer in Latin America.

== Philanthropy ==
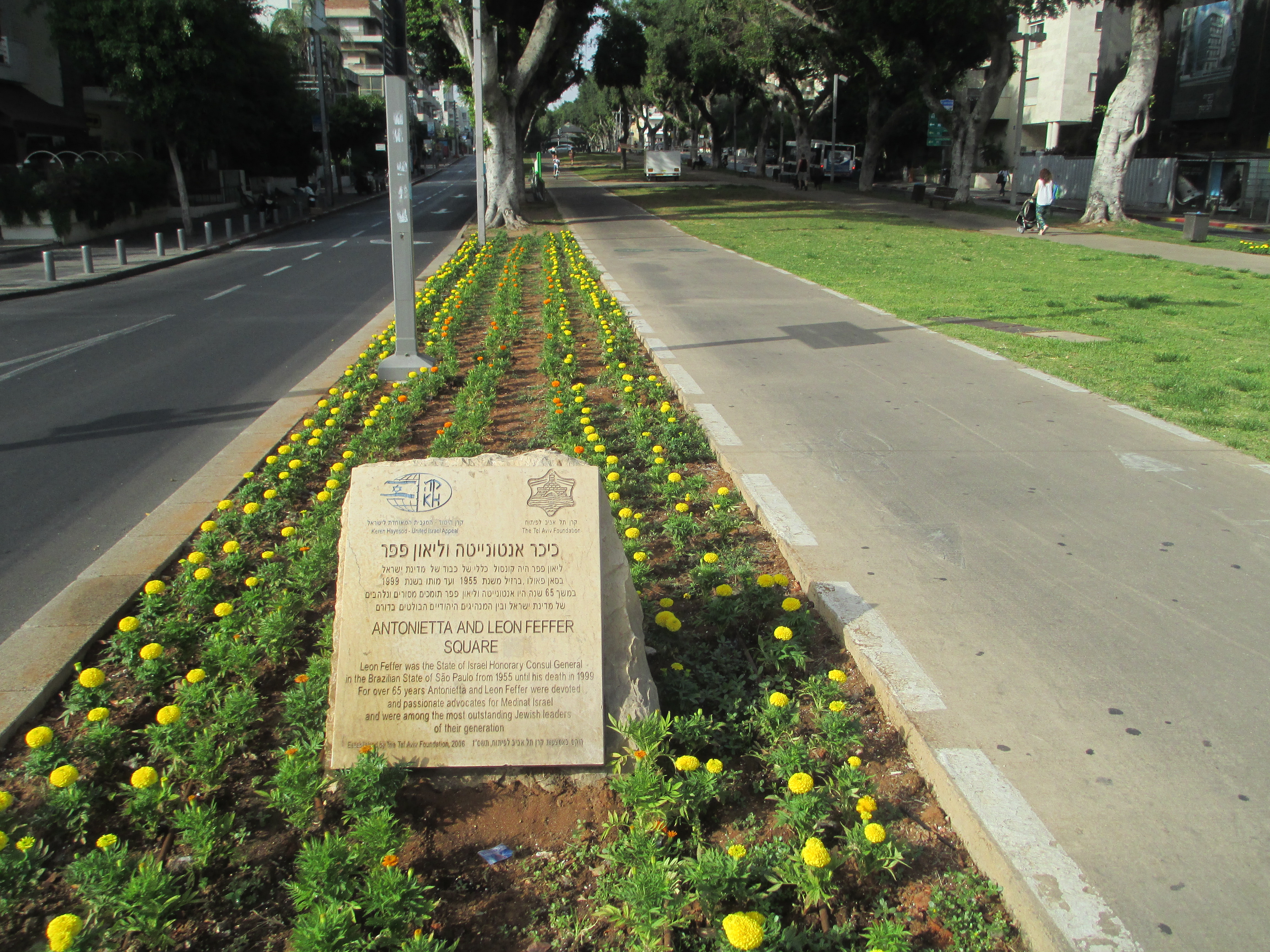
Antonietta and Leon Feffer Square in Rothschild Boulevard, Tel Aviv-Yafo, Israel

He served as president of Colégio Renascença, a school for the Jewish community from 1939 to 1962. In 1953, he was seminal in founding A Hebraica in São Paulo, then the largest Jewish club in the world. From 1956 to 1964, he served as Israel's consul to São Paulo (Federação Israelita do Estado de São Paulo). In 1959, he funded the construction of the Hospital Israelita Albert Einstein in the Morumbi, São Paulo neighborhood.

== Personal life ==
Feffer was married to Antonietta Teperman. They had two children, Max (1926–2001) and Fanny (1930–2017). He died on 7 February 1999.

In 1995, Forbes Magazine named him as the fifth richest Brazilian with a net worth of $1.6 billion US dollars.
