= Centro Israelita do Paraná =

Cultural center and synagogue, in Paraná, Brazil

Israelite Center of Paraná
- Spanish: Centro Israelita do Paraná
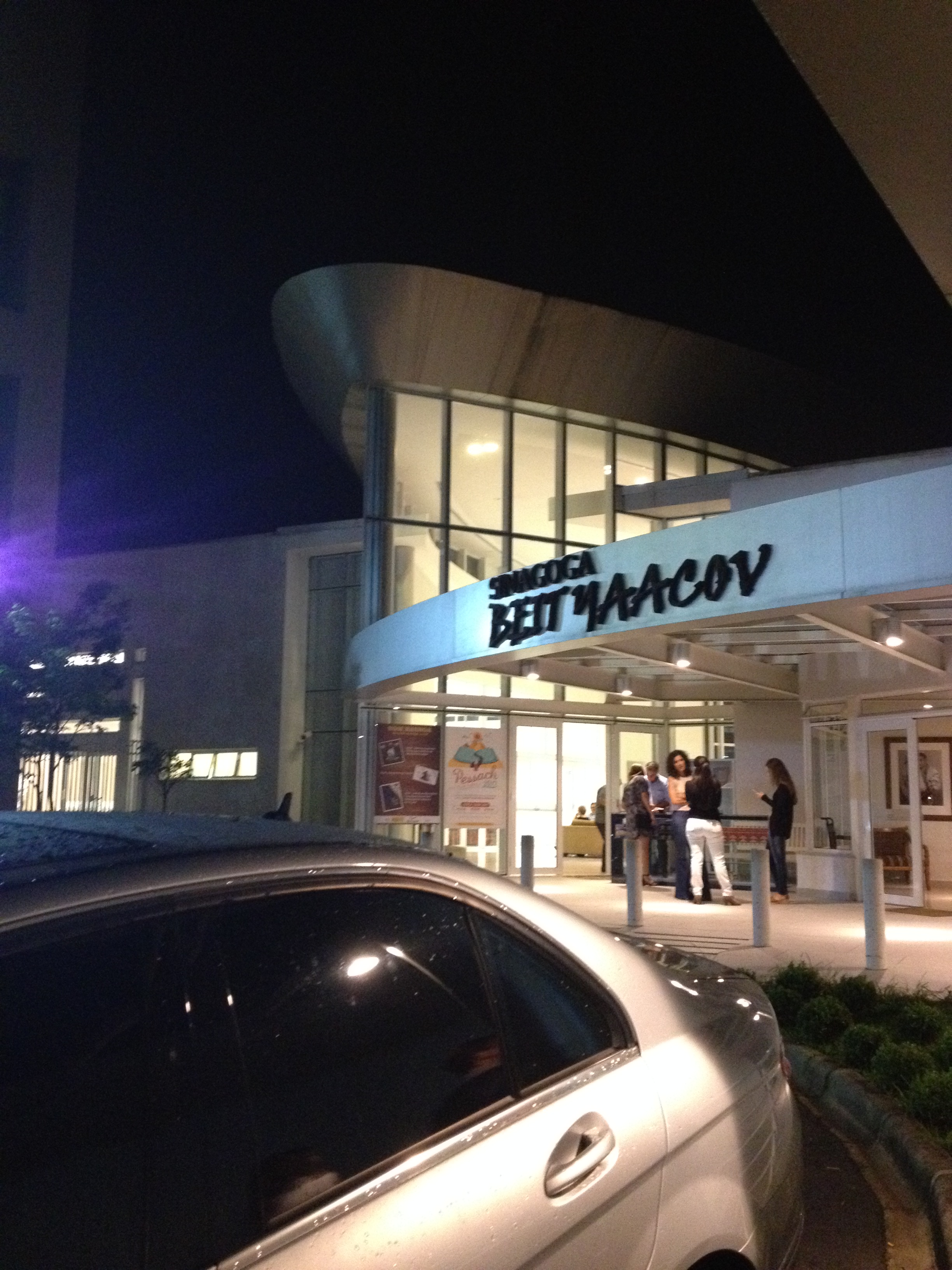
- The entrance to the synagogue, in 2017

- Location of the cultural center and synagogue in Brazil

Religion
- Affiliation: Conservative Judaism
- Rite: Nusach Ashkenaz
- Ecclesiastical or organizational status: Synagogue and cultural center
- Leadership: Rabbi Pablo Berman
- Status: Active

Location
- Location: 248 Agostinho Macedo, Curitiba, Paraná
- Country: Brazil
- Interactive map of Israelite Center of Paraná
- Coordinates: 25°24′52″S 49°16′21″W

Architecture
- Style: Modernist
- Established: 1913 (as the Kehila)
- Completed: 2011

Website
- kehila.com.br

The Israelite Center of Paraná (Spanish: Centro Israelita do Paraná) is a Jewish cultural center and Conservative synagogue, located in the city of Curitiba, in the state of Paraná, in southern Brazil. The synagogue is called the Beit Yaacov Synagogue (Spanish: Singagoa Beit Yaacov). The centre was completed in 2011 and in addition to communal space, it houses a synagogue, Jewish day school, and a Holocaust museum.

== History ==
The first Jew to arrive in Curitiba was José Flaks, who in 1889 arrived with his wife Roni and their children Michael and Frederick. Shortly thereafter came Max Rosenman. Both were originally from Galicia and settled in the area of Curitiba known as Barigui. The Flaks family were recognizable by their traditional Orthodox costume. Max Rosenman hosted religious services and even the manufacture of matzot for Passover. In 1913, the capital of Paraná had around 12 families and more than 20 single men. On 27 July 1913, at the initiative of Julius Stolzenberg, Bernard Schulman, Leo and Jacob Charatz Mandelman, it was decided that founded the Union Israelita do Parana, to care for cultural and religious needs of the community. In 1929, the first community centre was founded and it served as a synagogue, a school and a social club, under the stewardship of the Kehila.

Today, the community is one of the largest of southern Brazil. It has an active Zionist youth movement in Habonim Dror and many other departments. A newsletter of community events called Oi Kehilá (English: Hi Community) is produced and sent via E-mail to community members. In 2009, the community hired Argentine Rabbi Pablo Berman, formerly the rabbi of the Israeli Community of El Salvador.

== Facilities ==
=== Escola Israelita Brasileira Salomão Guelmann ===
Housed within the compound of the Jewish center is the Jewish school named after Salomão Guelmann who built and donated the school to the community in 1921, to serve as a foundation for the education of the Jewish children of Curitiba.

== See also ==
- History of the Jews in Brazil
- Holocaust Museum in Curitiba
- List of synagogues in Brazil
