= Suzano Papel e Celulose =

Brazilian paper and pulp producer

Suzano S.A.
- Type: Sociedade Anônima
- Traded as: B3: SUZB3; NYSE: SUZ; BMV: SUZ; BCBA: SUZ; Ibovespa Component
- Industry: Pulp and Paper
- Founded: 1924
- Founder: Leon Feffer
- Headquarters: Salvador, Bahia, Brazil (Fiscal Headquarters); São Paulo, Brazil (Administrative Headquarters)
- Key people: David Feffer, (Chairman); Walter Schalka, (CEO)
- Revenue: ▲US$ 9.0 billion (2025)
- Net income: ▲US$ 1.7 billion (2025)
- Number of employees: 37,000
- Website: www.suzano.com.br

Suzano Papel e Celulose (English: Suzano Paper and Pulp) is a Brazilian producer of paper and pulp with a presence in over 80 countries. It is the largest paper and pulp company in Latin America and among the biggest producers in the sector. The company is headquartered in Salvador, administrative office in São Paulo and others offices in Buenos Aires, Fort Lauderdale, London, Shanghai and Signy-Avenex.

The company is a leader in the paperboard market in Latin America. It is among the 10 largest producers of market pulp and the largest producer of eucalyptus pulp (paper) in the world. This achievement was possible thanks to the growth cycle completed in 2007, which paved the way for increased production capacity. 2017 saw a record volume of 1.2 million tonnes of paper production and 10.8 million tons of pulp production.

Suzano has eight industrial units located in the states of Maranhão, Bahia, São Paulo, Mato Grosso do Sul and Espírito Santo. The unit in Mucuri, south of Bahia is its largest. The factories in the state of São Paulo are located in Suzano, Rio Verde, and Limeira. The company is listed on the B3.

The company's main competitors are Eldorado Brasil, Celulose Irani, Arauco and CMPC.
