= Natura =

Brazilian beauty products company

Natura Cosméticos S.A.
- Type: Public
- Traded as: B3: NATU3; Ibovespa Component
- Industry: Cosmetics
- Founded: 1969; 57 years ago
- Headquarters: São Paulo, Brazil
- Area served: Worldwide
- Key people: Roberto Marques (Chairman); João Paulo Ferreira (CEO); Leandro Galvão (CFO)
- Revenue: ▲ R$ 36.9 billion (2020)
- Net income: ▼ R$ 399.5 million (2020)
- Number of employees: 35,000
- Subsidiaries: Avon Products (Latin America only)
- Website: www.natura.com.br

Natura Cosméticos S.A. is a Brazilian global personal care cosmetics group headquartered in São Paulo. The Natura Cosméticos currently includes the homonymous brand and Avon Products. The Group is present in 73 countries across all continents except Antarctica. Natura Cosméticos was founded in 1969 by Antônio Luiz Seabra and became a public company listed on São Paulo Stock Exchange in 2004. Currently the company is the largest Brazilian cosmetics company by revenue. In May 2019 Natura announced that it had entered into definitive agreement to acquire Avon Products, Inc. The transaction was approved by Brazilian regulations authorities in the beginning of November 2019 and was completed in January 2020, making Natura & Co the 4th largest pure-play beauty company in the world. In 2025, the Natura sold the global Avon operations (with exception of Latin America and Russia) to Regent LP and in the following year it is the company's turn to decide whether to sell its Russian operations to local company Arnest Group.

== History ==
In 1974, Natura adopted direct sales as sales model. In 2018 it had more than 6.6 million "consultants" (resellers) worldwide being the largest in the world.

Natura is a founding member of the Union for Ethical BioTrade, gradually ensuring that its sourcing practices promote the conservation of biodiversity, respect traditional knowledge and their goal is to share profits and resources with all participants in the supply chain. Natura does not test its cosmetic products on animals during development or production. The company follows international safety regulations for its manufacturing processes.

Being a public company since 2004, its shares are listed on Novo Mercado (the highest level of corporate governance or Stock Exchange Ibovespa). Natura's performance in 2017 shows a consolidated gross revenue of R$9.9 billion, a growth of 24.5% over the previous year. Its consolidated net income was R$670.3 million.

In 2005, Natura opened its first boutique in Paris, France. In 2013, Natura acquired Aesop. In January 2023, Natura sold the brand to L'Oréal.

In Brazil, major competitors of Natura are O Boticário, L'Oréal, Estée Lauder Companies, Jequiti and others.

From 2020 until 2024 American depositary shares of Natura traded on the New York Stock Exchange (NYSE). Its acquisition of Avon Products in 2020 turned Natura into the world’s fourth largest pure-play beauty group.

== Business model ==
Natura operates as a multi-level marketing company. Natura promotes its image as an eco-friendly, sustainable company (using natural products, working toward sustainable environment and social support etc.). The company also uses ordinary women rather than supermodels in its advertisements.
