= David Feffer =

Brazilian businessman

- Born: 1956 (age 69–70)
- Citizenship: Brazil
- Occupation: Businessman
- Known for: CEO and President of Suzano Papel e Celulose
- Spouse: Ana Feffer
- Children: 4
- Parent(s): Betty Vaidergorn Feffer; Max Feffer
- Family: Leon Feffer (grandfather)

David Feffer (born 1956) is a Brazilian businessman who presides over Grupo Suzano since 2003.

== Early life and education ==
Feffer is the eldest son of Betty (née Vaidergorn) and Max Feffer. He has three brothers: Daniel, Jorge and Ruben. His father was president of Suzano Papel e Celulose, a company founded by his grandfather, Leon Feffer, in 1924. His father pioneered the use of using eucalyptus pulp to produce paper and vertically integrated the company to become the second largest eucalyptus producer in the world. He attended coursed in business at Columbia University in New York City and the Aspen Institute and IMD in Switzerland. He has a law degree from the Law School of Mackenzie University and from the Business Administration School of Fundação Getúlio Vargas.

According to the Forbes list of The World's Billionaires, as of October 2021, he is worth $1.2 billion.

== Grupo Suzano ==
Grupo Suzano is a leader in the Latin American market. Suzano Paper and Pulp is listed at Bolsa de Valores de São Paulo. In January 2019, Suzano acquired Fibria Celulose for $7.5 billion, creating Brazil's largest paper producer. The combined company is now known as Suzano S.A.

The Suzano Group is one of the largest private companies in Brazil and participates, aside from the paper and pulp industry, in insurance sales, risk management, and the development of software and other products for the technology sector.

== Memberships and honors ==
Feffer is also an acting member of the LafargeHolcim International Consulting Council and the Consulting Council of the Brazilian Tree Industry. Additionally, Feffer acts as president of cultural and social institutions such as the Council for Philanthropic Foundation ARYMAX; the Directory Council of the Alef School and vice-president in the Directory Council of the EcoFuturo Institution.

== Personal life ==
He is married to Ana Feffer; they have four children. In 2008, their daughter, Adriana married André Skaf, the son of Brazilian politician Paulo Skaf. Their daughter, Marina Feffer (married to Brazilian restaurateur Daniel Oelsner) founded the Generation Pledge, a group of wealthy heirs dedicated to donating at least 10% of their inheritance to charity.

== Notes ==
- "Forte e gentil - Economia - Estadão". Economia.estadao.com.br.
- "David Feffer: Líder empresarial 4.0 - 23/02/2016 - Opinião - Folha de S.Paulo". Folha.uol.com.br.
- "Estudos de Caso de Boa Governança Corporativa" (PDF). Oecd.org.
