= Diagnosticos da America =

Brazilian clinical diagnostics company

Diagnósticos da América S.A.
- Formerly: Laboratório Clínico Delboni Auriemo S.A.
- Company type: Sociedade Anônima
- Traded as: B3: DASA3
- Industry: Healthcare
- Founded: 1961; 65 years ago
- Headquarters: Barueri, Brazil
- Key people: Glauco Desidério, (Chairman); Pedro de Godoy Bueno, (CEO)
- Products: Medical diagnosis
- Revenue: ▲US$ 1.0 billion (2013)
- Net income: ▲US$ 55.6 million (2013)
- Number of employees: 35,000
- Website: www.dasa.com.br

Diagnósticos da América S.A. (DASA) is a Brazil-based clinical diagnostics company. It also operates a food testing unit, advertising, publishing, human resources services, and research entities.

== History ==
Founded in 1961, the company originally known as Laboratório Clínico Delboni Auriemo is headquartered in Barueri, Greater São Paulo and it is owned by the Brazilian billionaire family Bueno.

In 2021, DASA acquired the oncology service provider GEM (Assistência Médica Especializada) for approximately R$ 750 million, expanding its cancer care operations in the Brazilian states of Bahia, Sergipe, and Rio Grande do Norte.

In 2024, Dasa and Amil agreed to combine their hospital operations in a 50/50 joint venture, comprising 25 hospitals and several oncology clinics.

Currently, it competes in Brazil with Amil, Fleury and Rede D'Or and its clinics work with numerous brands, such as Alvaro, CientíficaLab, Lavoisier, Delboni Auriemo, Alta, Leforte and Christóvão da Gama.
