= Jayme Garfinkel =

- Born: Jayme Brasil Garfinkel; November 30, 1946 (age 79)
- Education: Engineer
- Occupations: Chairman of Porto Seguro Seguros

Jayme Brasil Garfinkel is a Brazilian investor and chairman of the board of Porto Seguro Seguros, the third largest insurance company in Brazil.

== Biography ==
Garfinkel was born to a Jewish family, the son of Rosa and Abrahão Garfinkel. He received a degree in Civil Engineering from the Polytechnic School of the University of São Paulo in 1970 and completed graduate studies in Business Administration at Getúlio Vargas College in 1975. He joined Porto Seguro in 1972 as an assistant executive officer, assuming the role of executive officer vice president of Porto Seguro in 1978. Currently, he is chairman of the board and the chief executive officer of Porto Seguro, Porto Seguro Vida, Azul Seguros and Porto Seguro Saúde.

Garfinkel was a member of CNSP from 1987 until 1991, and was president of the Syndicate of Private Insurance and Capitalization Companies of the State of São Paulo from 1989 to 1990. Currently, he is a member of the Fenaseg's Consulting Committee (Federação Nacional de Seguros Gerais).

Garfinkel is the 1215th richest person in the world, according to Forbes Magazine, and 30th richest in Brazil. Although raised in a Jewish family, he considers himself an agnostic.
