= Porto Seguro S.A. =

Porto Seguro, Brazilian Insurance Company

Porto Seguro Seguros S.A.
- Company type: Sociedade Anônima
- Traded as: B3: PSSA3
- Industry: Financial services
- Founded: 1945
- Headquarters: São Paulo, Brazil
- Key people: Jayme Garfinkel, (CEO)
- Products: Insurance & Reinsurance
- Revenue: ▲US$ 7.3 billion (2025)
- Net income: ▲US$ 614.2 million (2025)
- Total assets: ▲US$ 12.4 billion (2025)
- Number of employees: 13,800 (2013)
- Website: portoseguro.com.br

Porto Seguro is the third largest Brazilian insurance company in Brazil. It was founded in 1945 and has more than 13,000 employees. The company operates through its subsidiaries in Brazil and Uruguay. It is headquartered in São Paulo.

The company offers car insurance, residential, health, life, and business, and the consortium also offers auto and homeowners, pension, savings bonds and other financial services. Porto Seguro competes with Bradesco Seguros, BB Seguridade, SulAmérica, Mapfre, Zurich Insurance Group and other insurance and reinsurance companies in Brazil.

Porto Seguro is the leader in the auto and homeowner insurance segments in Brazil and has around 10 million clients all over the different business lines.

Currently, the company is owned by the Brazilian businessman Jayme Garfinkel and the bank Itaú Unibanco, through PSIUPAR (Porto Seguro Itaú Unibanco Participações S.A.). "Since establishing an alliance with the bank Itaú in August 2009, Porto Seguro products have been available at the bank’s branches."

Aston Martin F1 Team announced Porto Seguro as a partner at the 2022 Abu Dhabi Grand Prix for the 2023 season.
