= Grendene =

Brazilian company

- Type: Sociedade Anônima
- Traded as: B3: GRND3
- Industry: Fashion
- Founded: 1971; 55 years ago
- Founders: Alexandre Grendene Bartelle; Pedro Grendene Bartelle
- Headquarters: Sobral, Ceará, Brazil
- Key people: Rudimar Dall'Onder (CEO)
- Products: Sandals
- Brands: Melissa; Grendha; Zaxy; Rider; Cartago; Ipanema; Pega Forte; Grendene Kids; Zizou
- Number of employees: 20,000 (2018)
- Website: grendene.com.br

Grendene is a Brazilian company that is the world's largest manufacturer of sandals. It was founded by Alexandre Grendene Bartelle and his twin brother Pedro Grendene Bartelle.

== History ==
In 1971, the Bartelle brothers, Alexandre and Pedro, began to create plastic basket holders for wine that was produced in the mountains of Rio Grande do Sul. 5 years later, the company began producing plastic parts for farm machinery, eventually evolving to producing soles and heels for shoes. In 1979, Grendene produced their first sandal, the Melissa Aranha, after Pedro noticed the strip-sandals of fishermen from the French Riviera. A year later, the first Grendene plant specifically made for shoe mold manufacturing was opened in Carlos Barbosa. The company would go on to form partnerships with designers like Jean-Paul Gaultier and Thierry Mugler. In 1984, the company started producing shoes for kids and 1986 saw the first men's shoe released. In 1990, the first Grendle shoe manufacturing plant was built in Fortaleza, with a second one opening in 1993 in Sobral, and a third in 1997 in Crato. Grendene would start creating new brands, with the Grendha line in 1994, the Melissa line in 1996. 2002 saw the shoe take stage at Sao Paulo Fashion Week, and partner with models like Gisele Bündchen, along with becoming the number 1 shoe manufacturer within Brazil, by number of pairs. On October 29, 2004, Grendene began trading shares on the Sao Paulo Stock Exchange. A new plant was open in Teixeira de Freitas in 2007. Grendene partnered with Vivienne Westwood and Zaha Hadid in 2008, as well as the launch of the Zaxy brand. More brands were created in 2009, with the launch of Cartago, the first line targeted to men. 2009 also marked the first time the company produced 150 million pairs of shoes. Today, Grendene has stores throughout the world, in London, New York City, Rio de Janeiro, and Milan. The company also partners with brands such as Mattel and Cartoon Network. In 2018, Grendene sold 173 million pairs of shoes and had 11 manufacturing plants, all located in Brazil.

The retail outpost's for the Grendene brand "Melissa" are known for their high concept designs by the Brazilian architect and artist Muti Randolph.
