= João Roberto Marinho =

Brazilian businessman

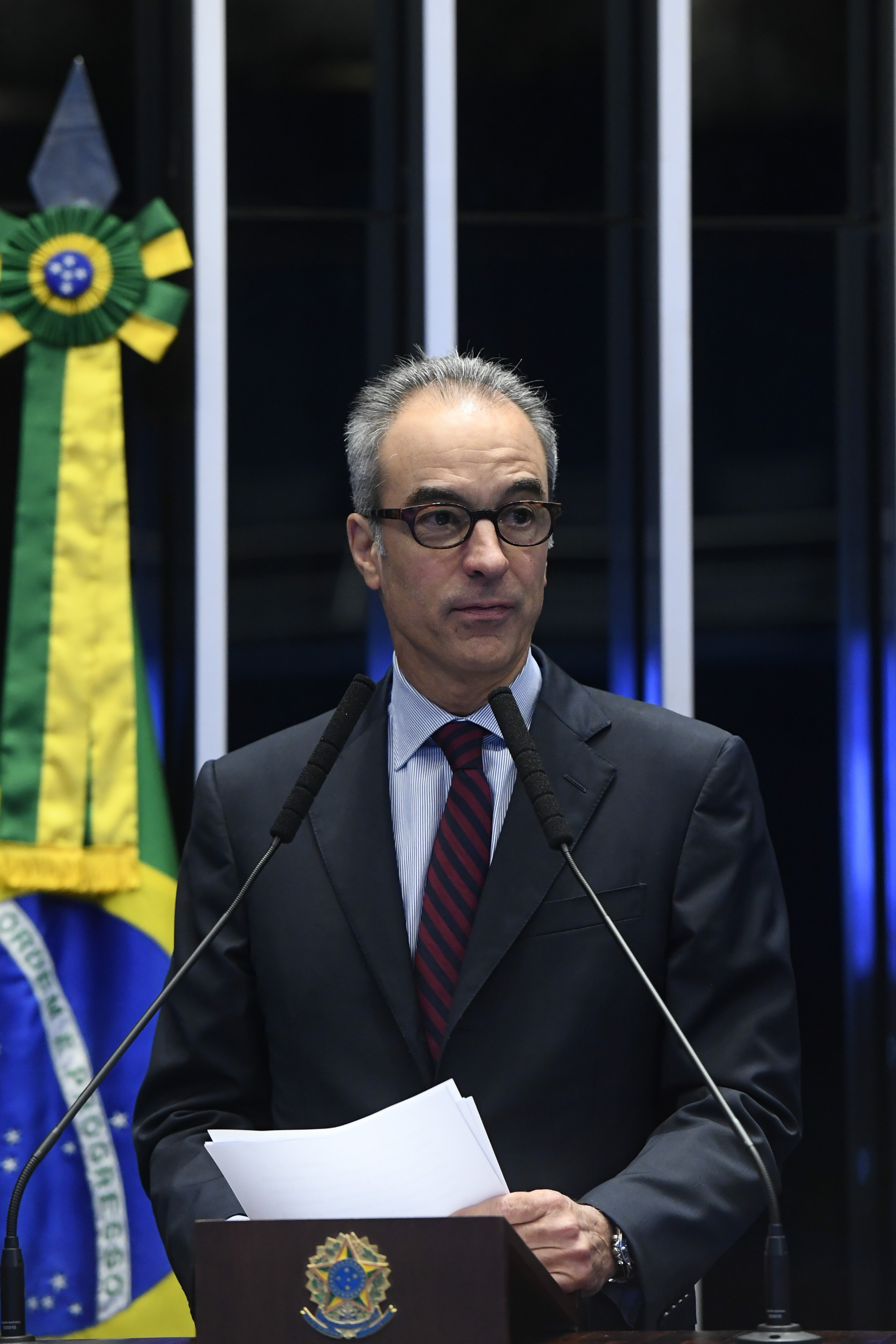
- João Roberto Marinho (2007)
- Born: September 16, 1953 (age 72); Rio de Janeiro, Rio de Janeiro, Brazil
- Occupations: CEO of the editorial board and vice president of the Grupo Globo
- Spouse: Gisela Marinho
- Parent: Roberto Marinho
- Relatives: José Roberto Marinho (brother); Roberto Irineu Marinho (brother)

João Roberto Marinho (Rio de Janeiro, September 16, 1953) is a Brazilian businessman, chairman of the editorial board and vice president of the Globo Organizations. He is the third of four children of Roberto Marinho (1904–2003).

== Career ==
João Roberto began his career as a journalist for the newspaper "O Globo". In the mid-1990s the Globo Organizations moved its command to the three sons of Roberto Marinho. According to Forbes 2015 World Billionaire's list, Marinho was placed at number 165 with an estimated net worth of $8.2 billion.

=== Grupo Globo ===
Marinho is vice-chairman of the board of directors, Chairman of the Editorial Board, Chairman of Grupo Globo Institutional Committee, and vice-chairman of the National Newspaper Association.

== Equestrianism ==
João Roberto is an amateur rider and was Brazilian champion by teams in 2010 (range of 1.20 m) mounting Haria.

== See also ==
- List of Brazilians by net worth
