= Miguel Krigsner =

Bolivian-Brazilian entrepreneur

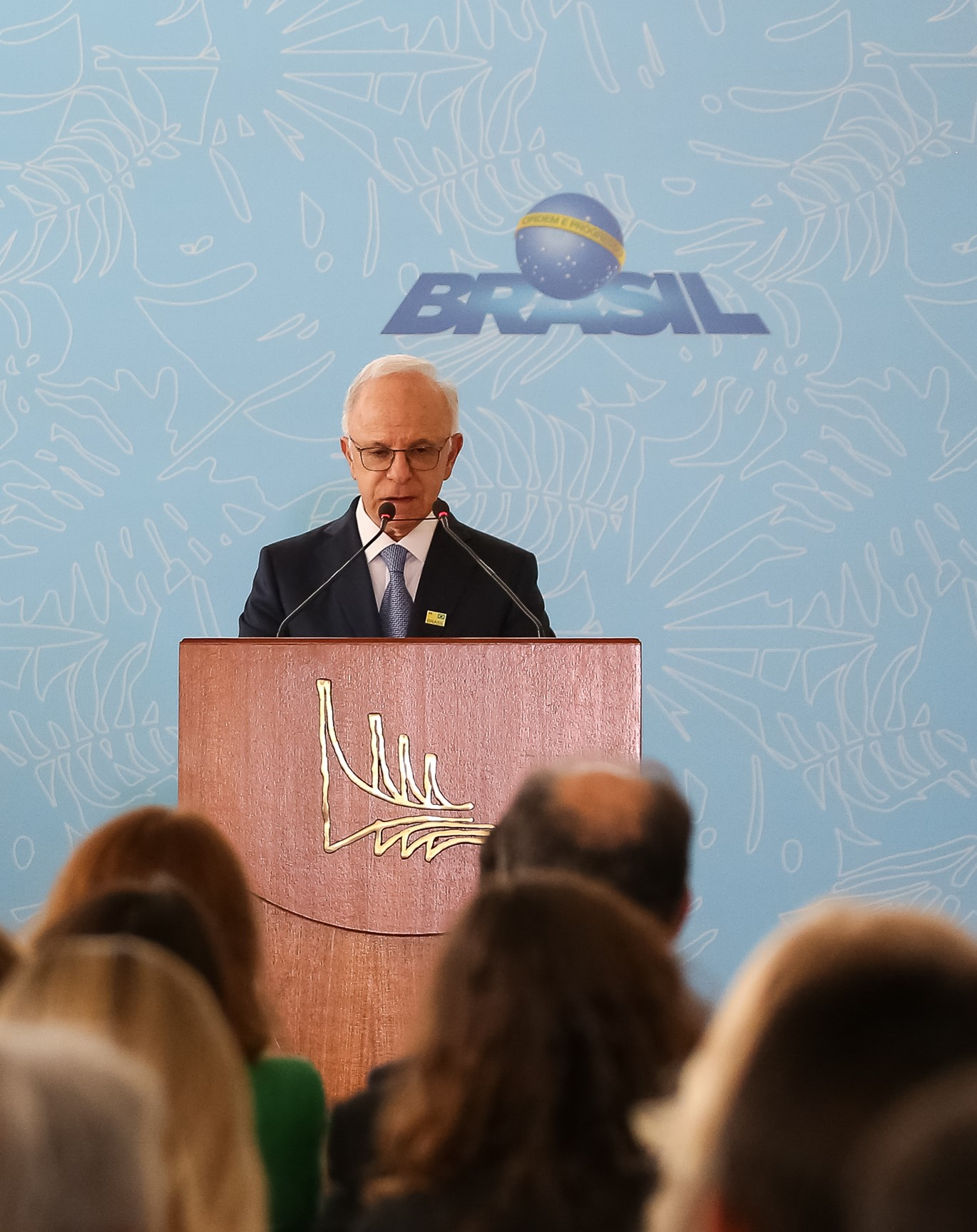
Miguel Krigsner giving a speech during the XXIX Prêmio Jovem Cientista Ceremony on December, 05, 2018

Miguel Gellert Krigsner (La Paz, Bolivia, January 9, 1950) is a Bolivian-Brazilian entrepreneur. He is the founder of the Brazilian company O Boticário, the second major cosmetic company in the Southern Hemisphere (Natura is the first). Krigsner is also the founder of the Fundação de Proteção à Natureza, one of the main Brazilian environmental NGOs. He also helped for the creation of the Holocaust Museum in Curitiba. Currently, according to Forbes, his net worth is estimated to be $6.8B.

He was born in La Paz, Bolivia into a Jewish family from La Paz. Born to Jacob Krigsner, a Polish Jew, and to Anneliese Krigsner, a German Jew. The Krigsners left Bolivia and moved to Brazil when Miguel was 11 years old, settling in the city of Curitiba.
