= University of Caxias do Sul =

University in Rio Grande do Sul, Brazil

Coordinates: 28.4894°S 50.9373°W

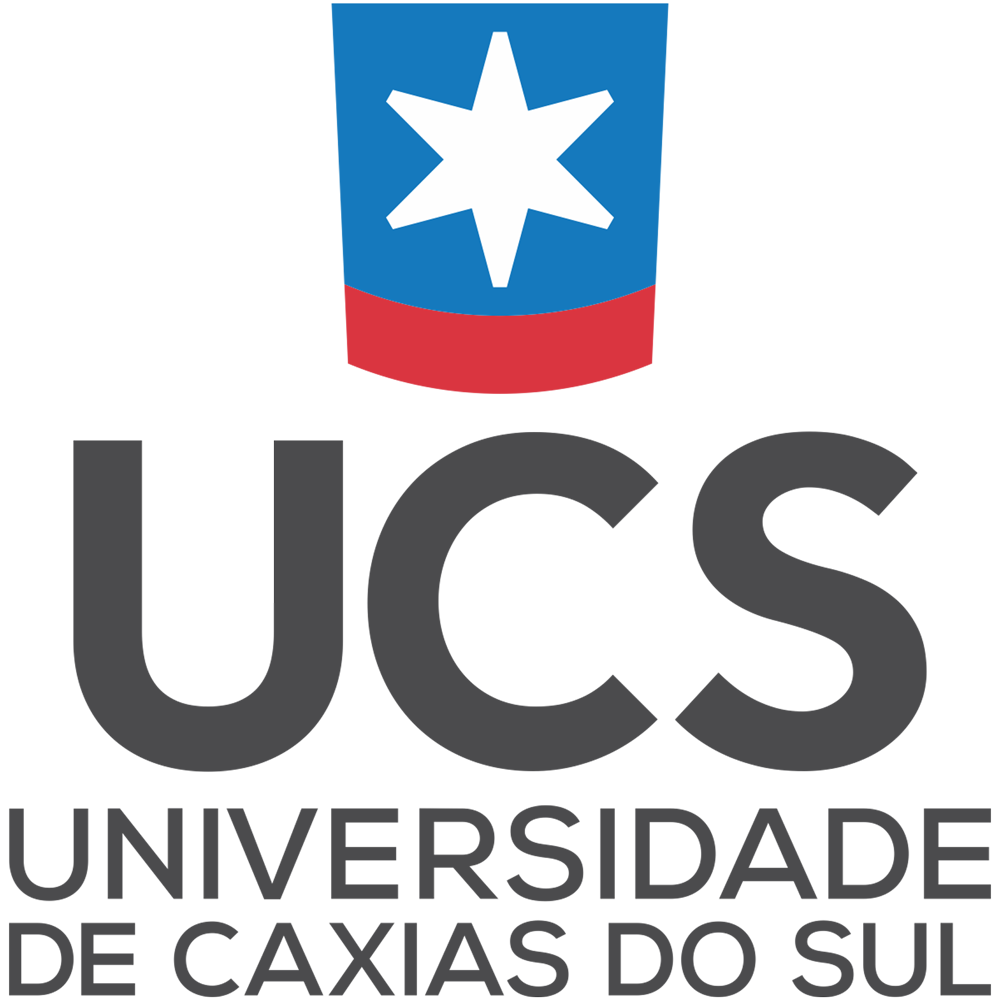
- Motto: In altum ducit
- Type: Private
- Established: 1967
- Rector: Gelson Leonardo Rech
- Location: Rua Francisco Getúlio Vargas, 1130; Caxias do Sul, Rio Grande do Sul, Brazil
- Colors: Blue; White; Red
- Website: www.ucs.br

The University of Caxias do Sul (Portuguese: Universidade de Caxias do Sul, UCS) is a private university in the state of Rio Grande do Sul, Brazil. It has units in the cities of Caxias do Sul, Bento Gonçalves, Vacaria, Canela, Farroupilha, Guaporé, Nova Prata and São Sebastião do Caí, offering more than 150 admission options in nine different areas of knowledge. In 2017 and 2018 it was listed by the university ranking of Folha de S. Paulo as the sixth best private university in the country.

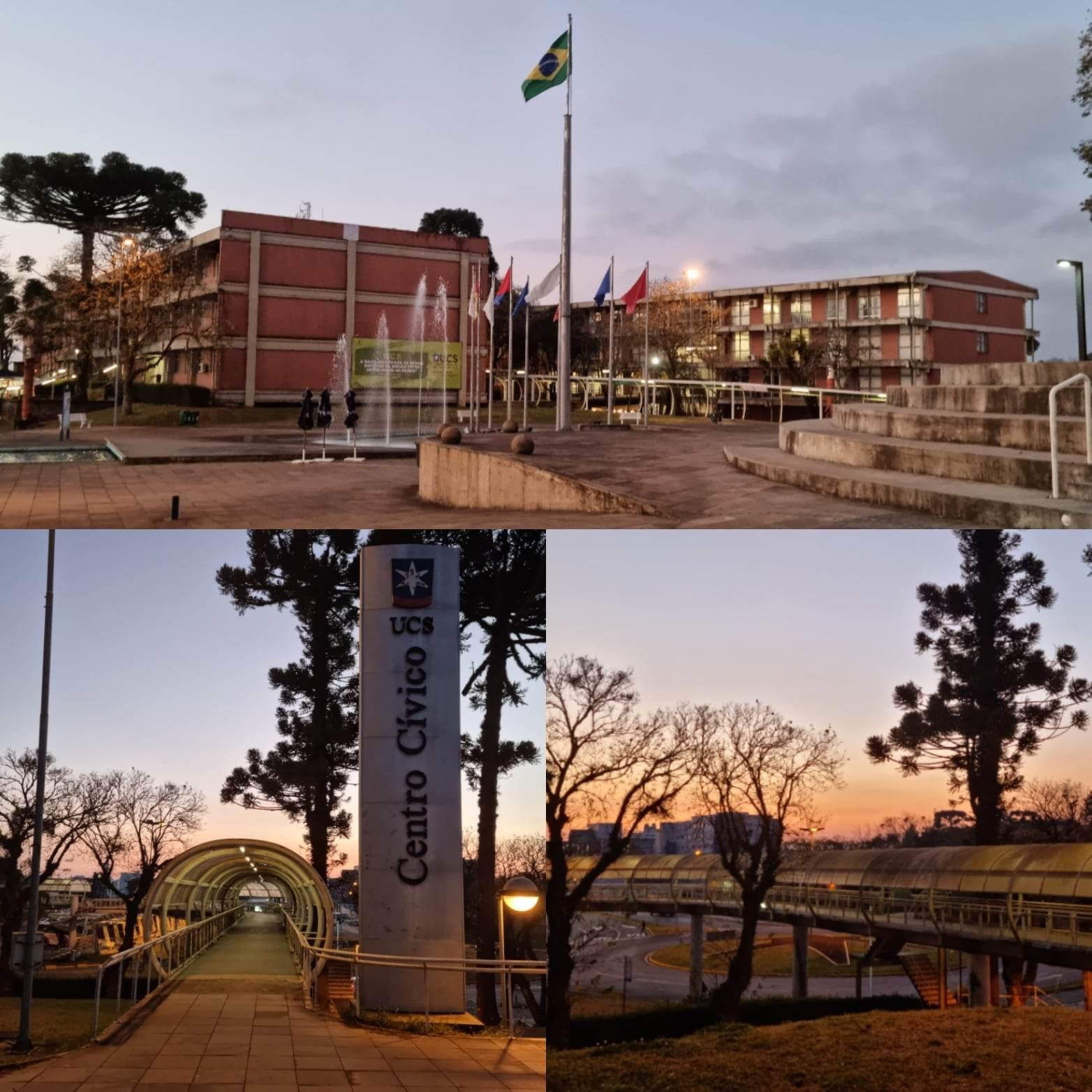
Civic Center - UCS

== History ==
The implementation of the first higher education courses in Caxias do Sul took place during the 1950s, a period marked in the history of Brazil due to changes in the economic, social and political field, resulting from the modernization process that the country was going through. Overcoming social problems and economic and cultural backwardness were some of the themes that mobilized organized sectors of society. In the field of education, the universalization of compulsory primary education, the expansion of secondary education and the official policy of encouraging the installation of private higher schools were some of the proposals launched by the state as a way of inserting education in the "developmentalist" effort.

Caxias do Sul was, already in the 1950s, the second metropolis of the state and, like the great urban centers of the country, also lived a period of economic growth and modernization. The city was transformed, the population modernized thoughts and habits, new priorities were set. Among the new social demands was the creation of new teaching options with the implementation of higher education courses to serve young people in the city and the region. At the end of the decade, several entities and personalities in the community were mobilizing to obtain authorization from the federal government to install the first higher education courses in the city.

Founded on February 10, 1967, the University of Caxias do Sul brought together the institutions that supported the first faculties, gathered under the name of Associação Universidade de Caxias do Sul, its main institution. He settled in the building of the former Sacrè Coeur de Marie boarding school, in the Petrópolis neighborhood, where the Rectory currently operates. The main campus occupies an extensive area of this neighborhood and was built in a modernist manner, in the form of isolated blocks implanted in a huge garden, which allowed the Institution's continuous physical expansion.

In 1974, after a period of financial and institutional crisis, the sponsoring Association was transformed into a Foundation - a private non-profit legal entity - in an institutional setting that best represented the community character and the regionalization proposals advocated by the university's founders. The members of the former Association and representatives of the Ministry of Education, the state government, municipalities and community entities participated in the management of the Foundation.

Between the 70s and 90s, the university remained faithful to the ideals of its founders. Practicing a policy of regional action, it took its action to the various municipalities in the region, while promoting integrated actions with other isolated institutions of higher education installed in municipalities in the region. In the late 1970s, students fought for the federalization of the institution, which would never happen.

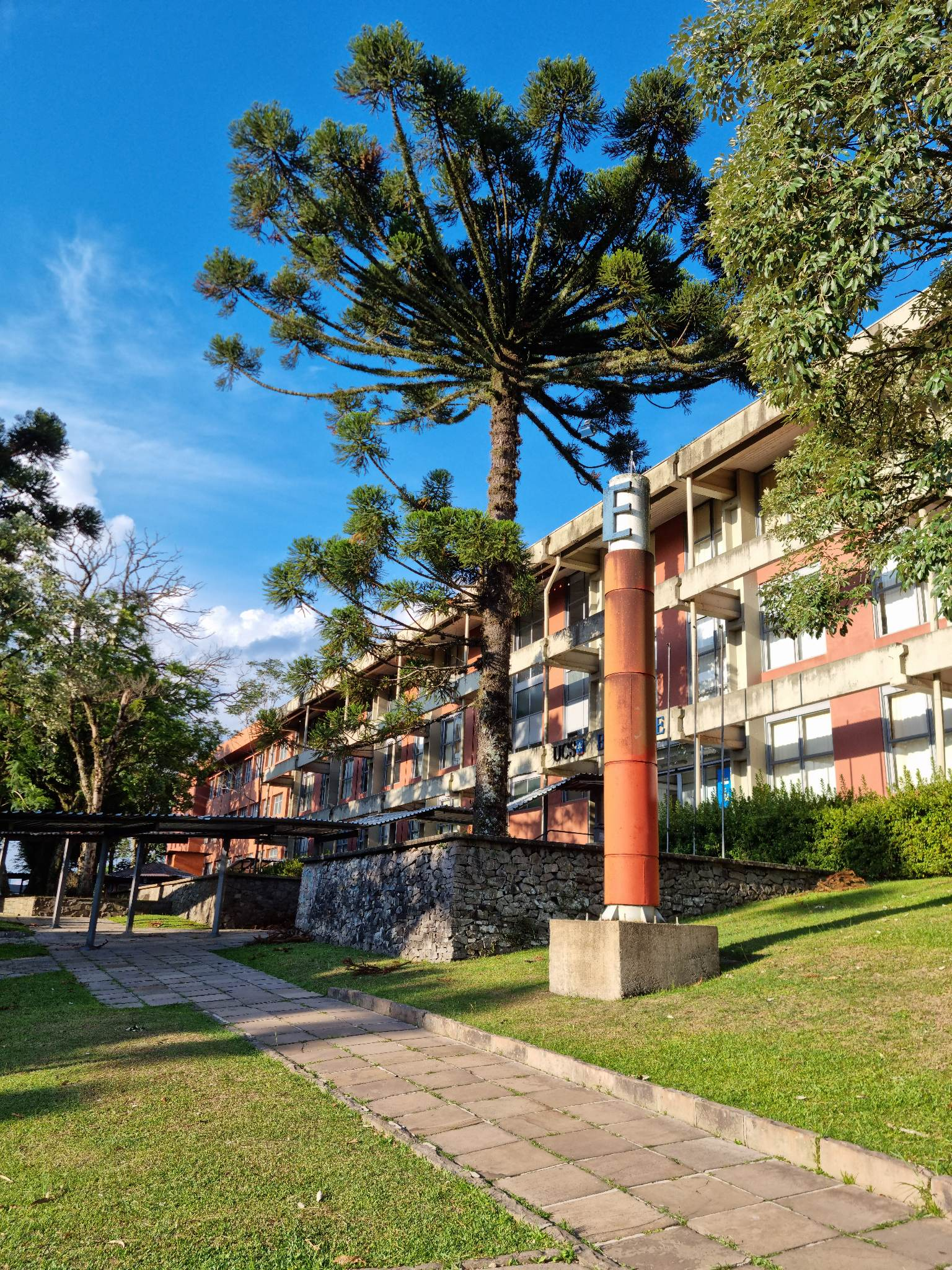
Building E - Humanities Knowledge Area

From 1990 onwards, based on the prerogative of university autonomy, the university's regionalization process took a strong boost with the implementation of action strategies that strengthened its community and regional character. New university units were created in regional sub-poles and UCS included the Educational Foundation of the Vinhedos Region, based in Bento Gonçalves and the Pro-Higher Education Association of Campos de Cima da Serra, based in Vacaria.

In 1993, the UCS regionalization project, submitted to Ministry of Education (MEC), received a favorable opinion from the Federal Education Council. In the official document, the reporter's words summed up the sentiment of all those who, over the years, had embraced the cause of UCS regionalization and endorsed a commitment made by the leaders who advocated a University for the Region. He said: "Time has taught that the sum of forces is the best option, now in the form of a Regional University. It appears, therefore, that Regionalization, so dreamed and pursued, arrives at the right time; at the full maturity of the participating institutions; in the perpetual joviality of those who launch themselves and persevere in art and science to promote human people through education ".

In 2010, it was considered by the National Institute of Educational Studies and Research to be the second best private university in Brazil, surpassed only by the Pontifical Catholic University of São Paulo. For several years, the institution has stood out as one of the main private universities in Brazil

Today, the University of Caxias do Sul is already an essential part of the regional development project and seeks, through continuous qualification and incentives to university students, to grow and consolidate its presence in the national and international university panorama.

== Campus ==
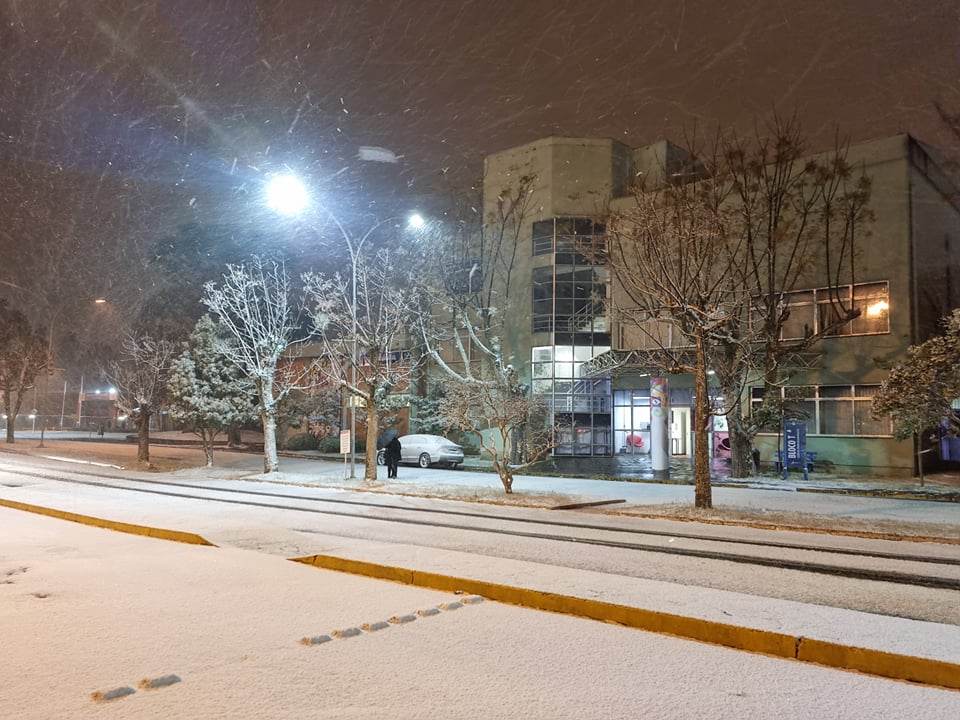
Snowfall at the University of Caxias do Sul

The main campus is located in Caxias do Sul, with satellite campuses in Bento Gonçalves, Vacaria, Farroupilha, Guaporé, Nova Prata, São Sebastião do Caí, Canela, and Veranópolis.

== UCS Radio ==
UCS FM is a Brazilian radio station based in Caxias do Sul. It operates on the 106.5 MHz frequency and belongs to the University of Caxias do Sul. It has its own stations in the cities of Bento Gonçalves and Vacaria, operating in the 89.9 MHz and 106.1 MHz frequencies.

== Theater ==
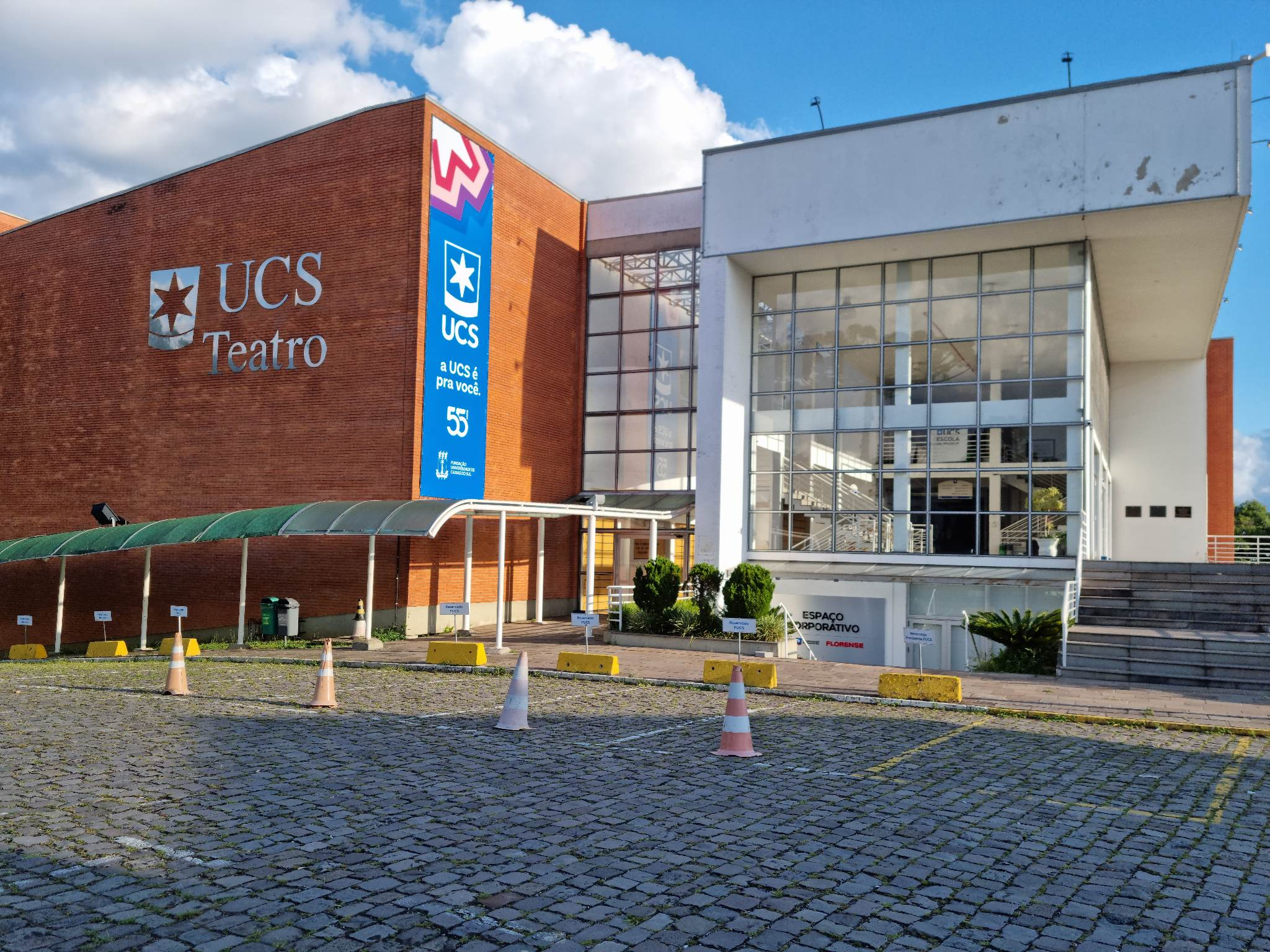
UCS Theater

Inaugurated in August 2001, with a show by Mercedes Sosa and Fagner, the Theater of the University of Caxias do Sul, or UCS Theater, as it is better known, is a space where knowledge, art, culture and entertainment alternate and mix, offering the community the possibility of developing and expanding cultural and aesthetic taste, through musical shows, concerts and plays. With a capacity to comfortably receive 755 people, UCS Teatro is a privileged location for holding large academic events, graduations, lectures and student meetings. In his agenda there is always a place reserved for the rehearsals and presentations of the Symphonic Orchestra of the University of Caxias do Sul, which has already formed a captive audience and, once a month, presents a show with free admission, always with the participation of guests. Great names from the national and international artistic scene have already performed on the UCS Teatro stage.

In July 2020, the Symphony Orchestra was extinguished after 19 years of intense activity, alleging financial difficulties and problems caused by the COVID-19 pandemic.

== Olympic Village ==
The Olympic Village (Portuguese: Vila Olímpica) is an organ of the center for Biological and Health Sciences and its purpose is to carry out, stimulate and support teaching, research and extension activities involving sports, in its different modalities, and the practice of physical activity, such as promotion health and social welfare. It is, therefore, an important support body for the Institution's courses, especially those in the Health area, and for the Technological Center University of Caxias do Sul (CETEC). Its activities and services are available to the internal and external community.

The "Vila" gathers a sports-educational complex, in an area of over 20 thousand m², which includes classrooms, laboratories, three gyms (two in Gym II and one in Block 70), three gyms, swimming pool, multipurpose courts, track athletics, tennis and paddle courts, soccer field and volleyball and beach soccer courts.

Contributing to the realization of university extension, Vila Olímpica maintains several sports initiation schools, and offers activities directed at its gymnasiums and swimming pool for the internal and external public. It also supports, with personnel, technical guidance and infrastructure, the community-based programs developed by UCS, especially the Citizen of the 21st Century Program and the University of the Elderly.

The creation of undergraduate courses in Physiotherapy and Nutrition, and of Specialization in Sports Medicine and Exercise and Sports and Health Sciences, as well as the creation, in 2001, of the Institute of Sports Medicine and Sciences Applied to Human Movement, they have also been added to the actions of the university, in the scope of teaching, research and extension, aimed at sports, health and quality of life of the population.

Among its activities, the UCS Olympics Program, launched by the university in 1997, stands out as part of the commemorative activities of its thirty years of foundation, whose purpose is to stimulate the training of athletes in the Olympic modalities, and the partnership with the Institute of Medicine of Sport and Sciences Applied to the Human Movement, an interdisciplinary body that carries out actions aimed at high performance sports.

In 2006, the UCS Olympics Program became part of the Olympic Village, an academic unit focused on teaching, research and extension, with regard to the area of sports and quality of life.

In essence, the UCS Olympics Program aims to encourage the training of athletes in Olympic modalities, promoting actions aimed at: training sports, high-level sports, university sports, and sports for athletes with special needs. As a markedly extension program, it must also feed, and feed on, the teaching and research activities carried out by the academic community.

Modalities The Program hosts activities in 22 sports, from categories ranging from children to adults, in which around 1,400 athletes are involved. The activities of the Program also constitute an internship field for undergraduate and graduate students. Some of the activities practised are athletics, basketball, canoeing, football, futsal, handball, taekwondo, tennis, triathlon, and volleyball.

== Library ==
The University of Caxias do Sul has one of the largest bibliographic collections in Latin America, comprising more than 1,000,000 copies. The entire university collection is distributed in 12 existing libraries on the institution's campuses.

== Foreign language program ==
The Foreign Languages Program promotes and provides opportunities to learn different languages, for different audiences: teenagers, adults and seniors. It offers regular teaching programs, with semester terms. Currently, the program offers courses in English, German, Italian, Spanish, French, Chinese, Japanese, as well as Portuguese for foreigners.

== Technological Center University of Caxias do Sul (CETEC) ==
CETEC is a high school and professional school, maintained by Fundação Universidade de Caxias do Sul, with teaching units in Caxias do Sul (headquarters) and Bento Gonçalves. Created in 1995, under the seal of a higher education institution, CETEC has been working to consolidate itself as an institution of excellence in youth education, through an educational proposal that combines a solid base of general education with training for youth. work, integrating quality high school and technical courses, which both prepare young people to enter university, and enable them to start a professional activity in the technical area.

In order to materialize its educational proposal, CETEC follows a philosophical guideline and a curriculum specially designed for the contemporary youth, who is in search of knowledge, skills and intellectual and ethical autonomy and who therefore needs guidance, encouragement and support to carry out with this stage of your training.

At CETEC, young people are challenged to exploit their ability to learn as much as possible, prioritizing study and research in their learning process. You are encouraged to develop your personal, intellectual and social skills, taking responsibility for your training process. He is provoked to investigate, analyze and propose, having as a reference a code of ethical principles and values. He is encouraged to interact and collectively build ideas, projects and knowledge, learning to respect differences and to value the common good. He is guided and supported to assume responsibilities and plan his path towards maturity, building his identity, becoming a citizen prepared to intervene in a positive and transforming way in society.

As an essential factor for the development of its proposal, CETEC maintains a teaching staff formed by professors with diverse academic and professional experiences, with different degrees, trained to act as intermediaries in the student development process.

The location of schools within university campuses is another quality differential of CETEC. Library, museum, laboratories, gyms, sports courts, swimming pool, theater and cinema are part of the physical structure of the university open to the CETEC student, who can thus enjoy the results of intellectual, cultural and scientific production typical of the university environment.

== Gallery ==
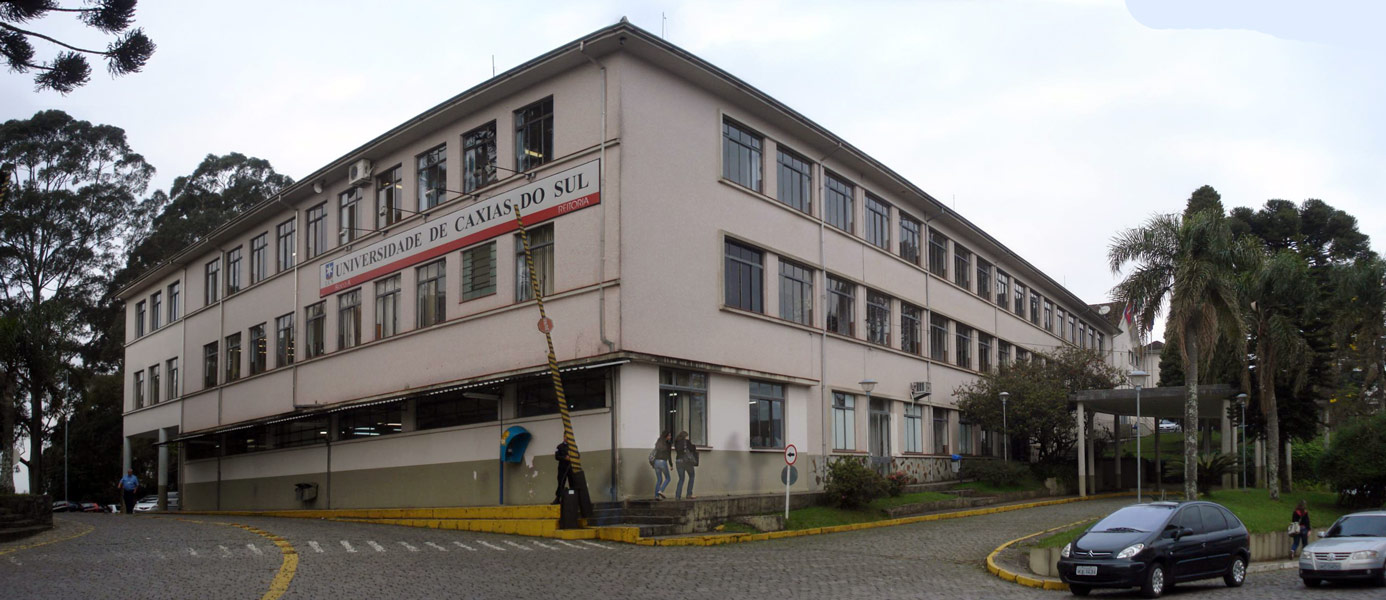
Office of the University President

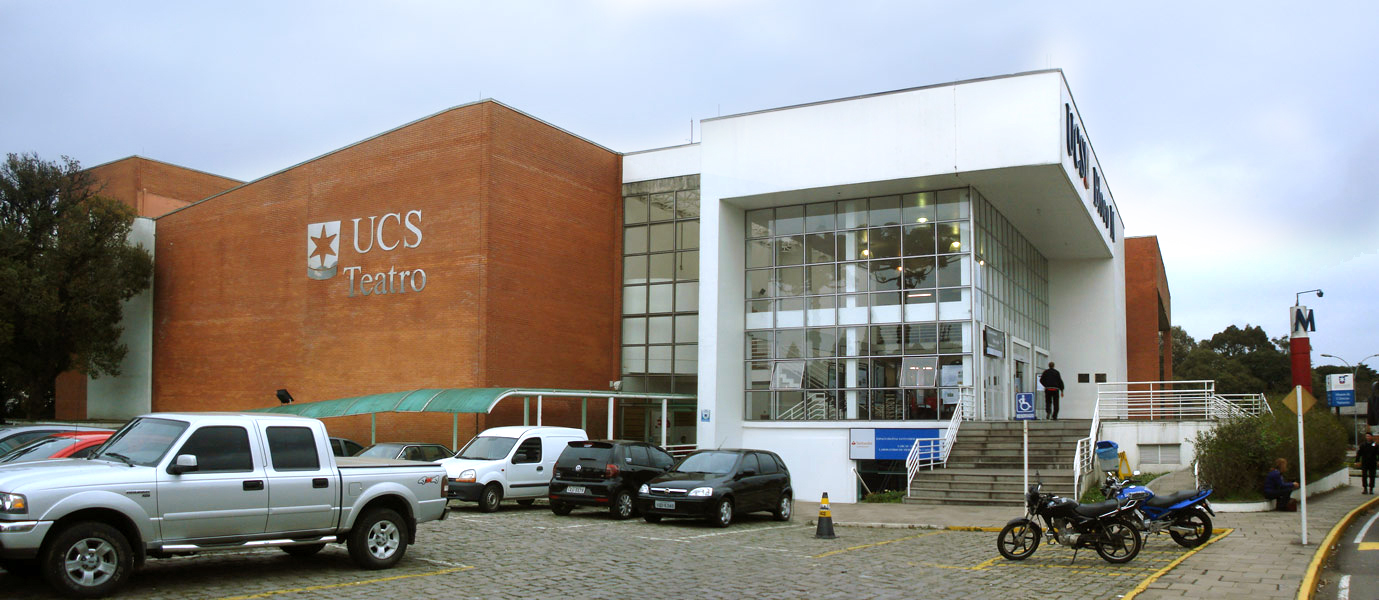
UCS Performing Arts Theater

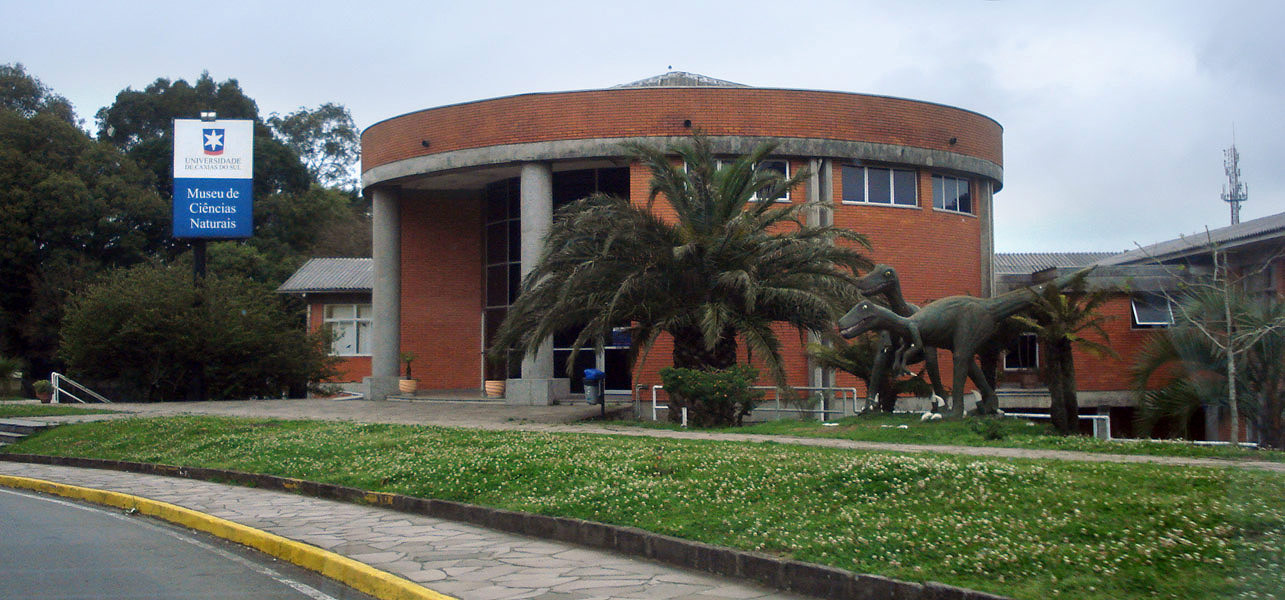
Museum of Natural Science

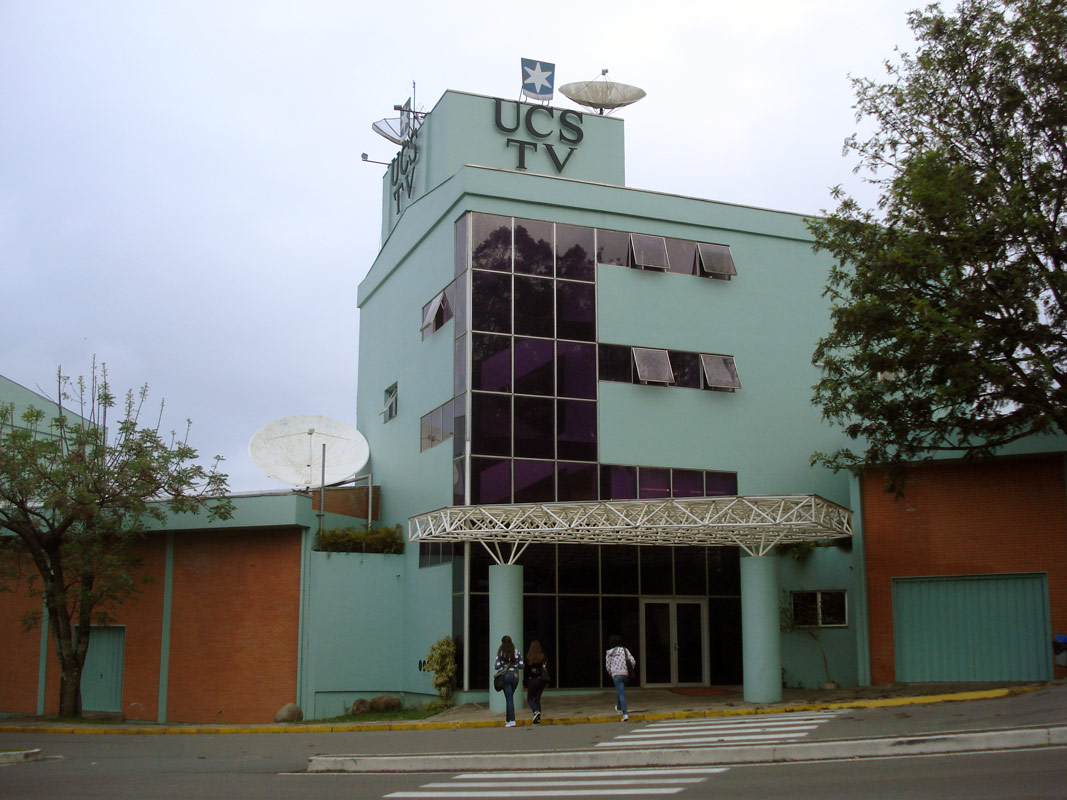
UCS TV broadcast building

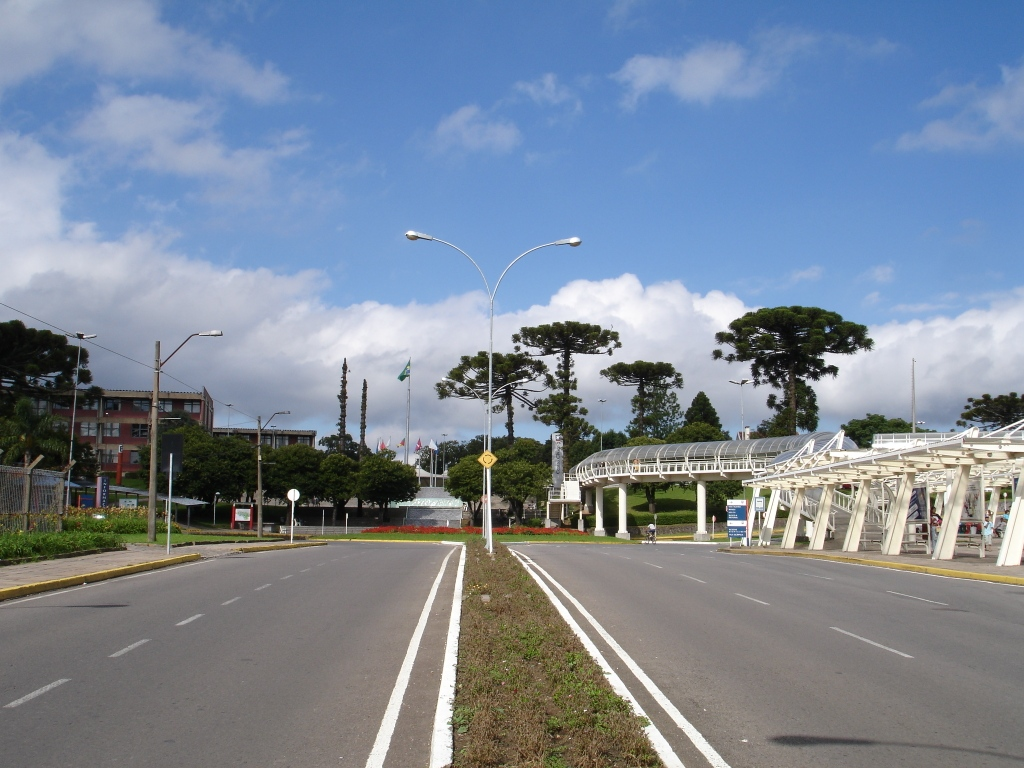
The main road into the campus
