= Roberto Marinho =

Brazilian media entrepreneur (1904–2003)

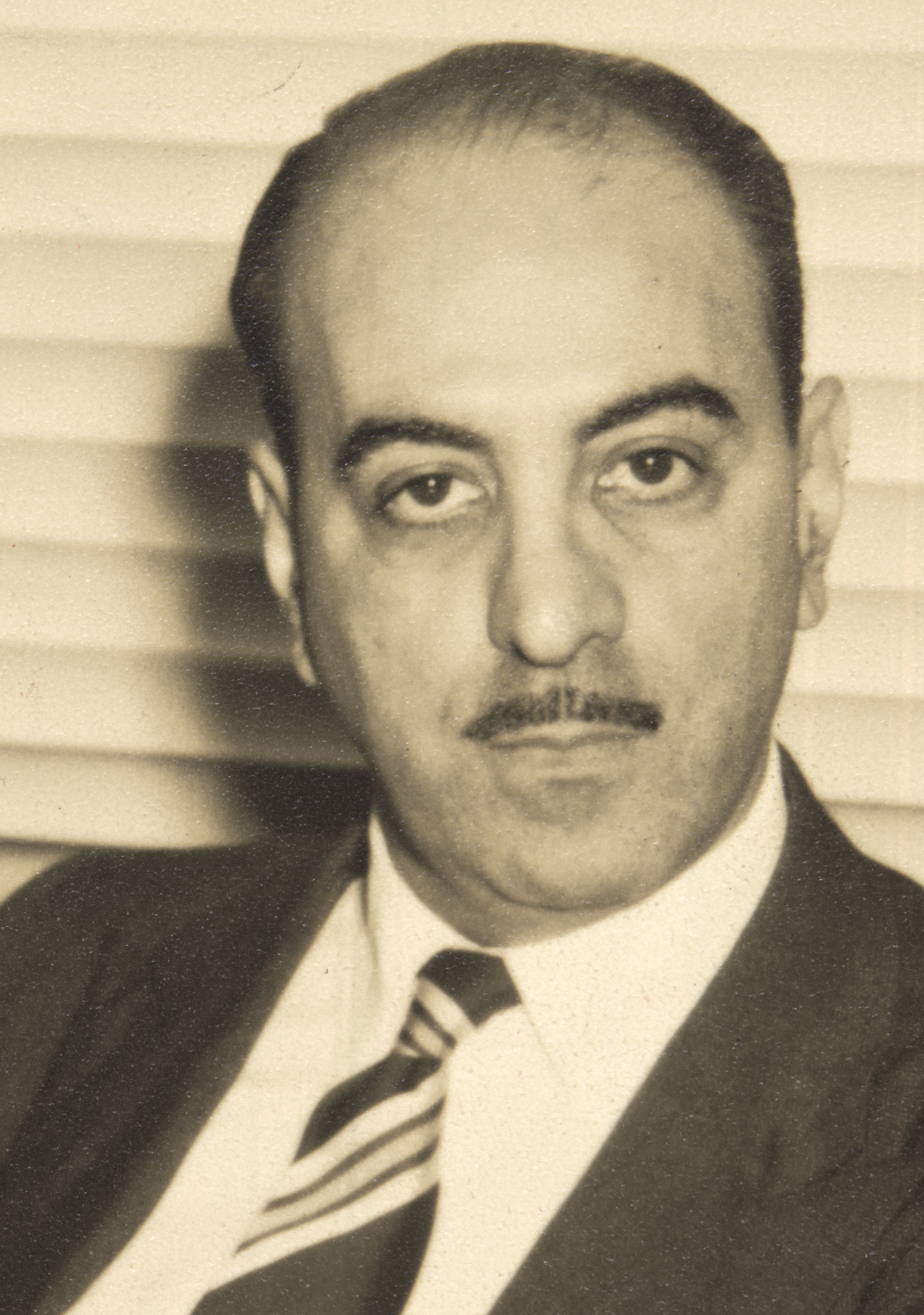
- Roberto Marinho
- Born: Roberto Pisani Marinho; 3 December 1904; Rio de Janeiro, DF, Brazil
- Died: 6 August 2003 (aged 98); Rio de Janeiro, RJ, Brazil
- Occupation: Businessman
- Years active: 1925–2003
- Known for: Founder of TV Globo
- Children: 4 (including Roberto, João and José)

Roberto Pisani Marinho (3 December 1904 – 6 August 2003) was a Brazilian businessman and tycoon who was the founder and owner of media conglomerate Grupo Globo from 1925 to 2003, and during this period expanded the company from newspapers to radio and television.

Born and raised in Rio de Janeiro, Marinho inherited the newspaper O Globo and began working there as a reporter. Later he became the chief editor. Marinho founded and was the president of the Brazilian TV channel, Rede Globo, the biggest television network in the country; it now has 123 stations and associates.

Marinho is considered one of the most influential and powerful figures of the 20th century in Brazil.

== Biography ==
Roberto Marinho was born at 17:00 BRT on 3 December 1904 in Rio de Janeiro to Irineu Marinho, a publisher, and his wife, Francisca Pisani. His parents were of Portuguese and Italian descent, respectively. He was raised as a Roman Catholic and was educated in local schools.

On 29 July 1925, his father Irineu Marinho started a morning newspaper called O Globo in Rio de Janeiro, which he had intended to complement his afternoon paper. He died three weeks later. At the age of 21, the younger Marinho fancied being a journalist and appointed himself as a trainee reporter at the newspaper he inherited. He advanced to chief editor six years later.

In the 1940s, Marinho expanded into commercial radio. In the 1960s, he took his company into television. On 26 April 1965, he founded Rede Globo, which became the principal TV station in Brazil and the second largest in the world. This was during the period of the military dictatorship, which pressured the media to support the government.

According to journalist Aristotle Drummond, Marinho was a loyal Catholic who opposed the "liberation theology" developed in Latin America in the 1970s, in which leading clerics supported popular political movements seeking social justice. He criticized his friend Helder Câmara, who was archbishop of the "miserably poor" Olinda and Recife diocese from 1964 to 1985, during the worst of the military dictatorship. Marinho greatly admired John Paul II as pope.

By the 1970s, Marinho was considered one of South America's richest men and renown figure in media moguls of the world. The holding Organizações Globo controls not only the newspaper and TV Globo, but also a chain of radio stations, such as Rádio Globo and Rádio CBN, as well as other cable TV channels. Globo Television reaches almost every home in Brazil through 113 stations and associates. The network has the authority to set the start times for Brazil's soccer matches.

With the production of telenovelas (soap-operas), TV Globo has capitalized on its reach. It has exported many of the programs to various countries, earning more in royalties and other revenues. Isaura the Slave Girl is one of the topmost successes of the company since it was sold to more than 80 countries, including China, in the 1970s.

Marinho died at 22:30 BRT on 6 August 2003, at the age of 98.

== Legacy and awards ==
- Jacarepaguá Airport in Rio de Janeiro is named after Roberto Marinho.
- He was awarded the Maria Moors Cabot Prize

Academic offices
Preceded by Otto Lara Resende	8th Academic of the 39th chair of the Brazilian Academy of Letters; 1993–2003	Succeeded by Marco Maciel
Business positions
Preceded by Irineu Marinho	Chairman of Grupo Globo; 1925–2003	Succeeded by Roberto Irineu Marinho
