= José Roberto Marinho =

Brazilian businessman

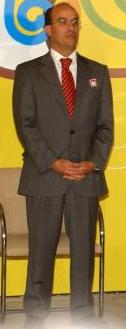
- Marinho in 2004
- Born: 26 December 1955 (age 70); Rio de Janeiro, Brazil
- Occupations: Vice-president, Grupo Globo
- Children: 5
- Parent(s): Roberto Marinho (father); Stella Goulart Marinho (mother)
- Relatives: João Roberto Marinho (brother); Roberto Irineu Marinho (brother)

José Roberto Marinho (born 26 December 1955) is a Brazilian billionaire businessman and one of three sons of the late communications tycoon Roberto Marinho (1904–2003). He is the president of Roberto Marinho Foundation and vice-president of Grupo Globo. As of October 2021, his net worth is estimated at US$1.8 billion.

== Early life ==
José Roberto Marinho was born on 26 December 1955 in Rio de Janeiro, Brazil. Marinho is one of three sons of Roberto Marinho, founder of conglomerate Grupo Globo.

== Career ==
Following the death of his father in 2003, aged 98, he and his brothers inherited control of Grupo Globo, Brazil's largest media group. Marinho heads up the Roberto Marinho Foundation, the family's philanthropy arm, which supports educational and cultural causes. He is a trustee of Rare, an international conservation organization based in the United States.

== Personal life ==
Marinho is married, with five children, and lives in Rio de Janeiro, Brazil.
