= Antônio Luiz Seabra =

- Known for: founder and largest shareholder, Natura
- Spouse: married
- Children: 4

Antônio Luiz Da Cunha Seabra is a Brazilian billionaire businessman, and the founder and largest shareholder of the Brazilian cosmetics company Natura.

Seabra has a bachelor's degree in economics.

Seabra founded Natura in 1969, and it started using a similar business model to Avon, selling door-to-door.

He owns Bresco, a Brazilian "property-rental operation focused on industrial property, warehouses, offices and hotels".

Seabra is married, with four children, and lives in London, England. He has been based in London since at least 2007.
