= Roberto Irineu Marinho =

Brazilian billionaire businessman (born 1947)

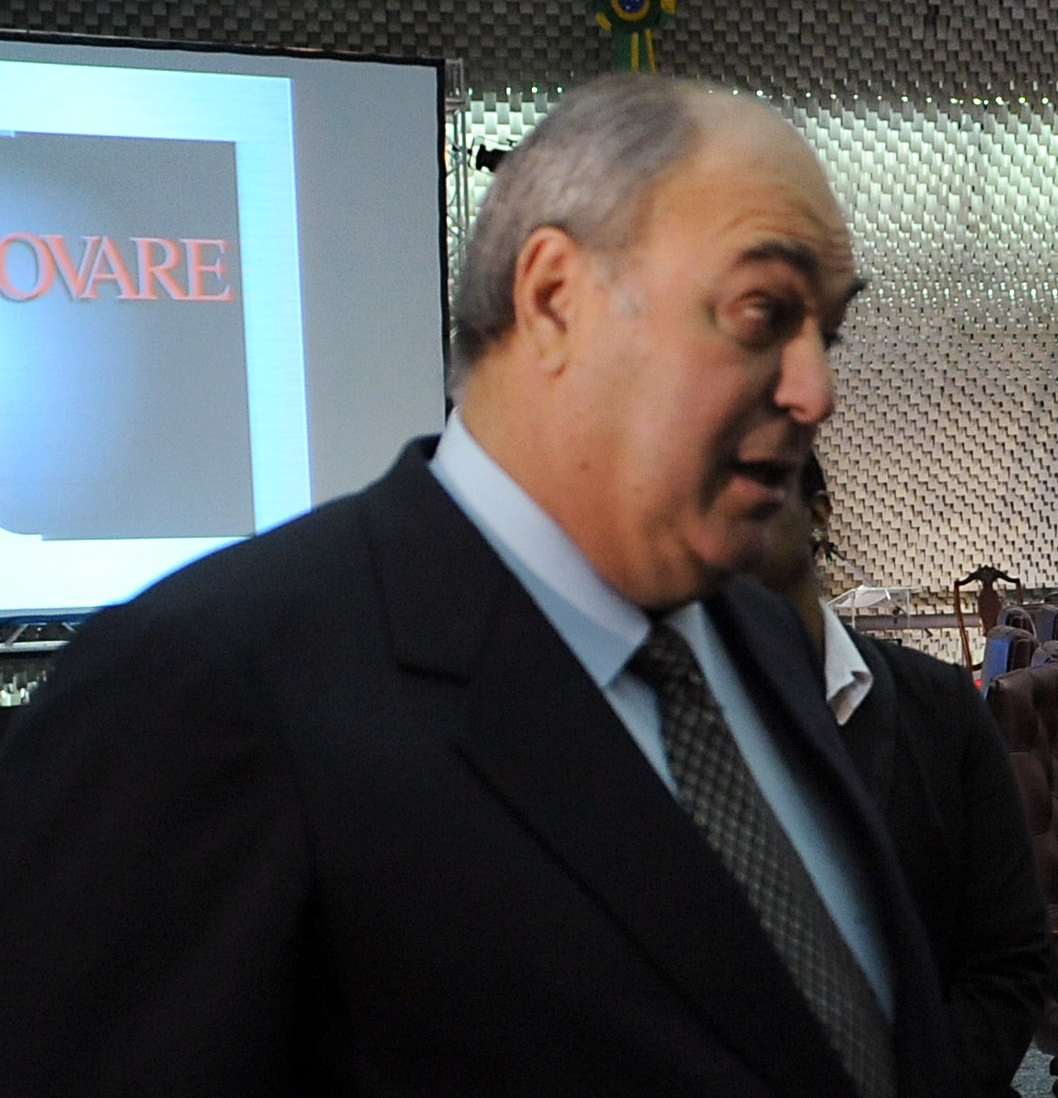
- Marinho in 2009
- Born: October 13, 1947 (age 78); Rio de Janeiro, Brazil
- Occupations: Co-owner, chairman and CEO of Grupo Globo
- Children: 4
- Parent(s): Roberto Marinho (father); Stella Goulart Marinho (mother)
- Relatives: João Roberto Marinho (brother); José Roberto Marinho (brother)

Roberto Irineu Marinho (born October 13, 1947) is a Brazilian billionaire businessman. He is the co-owner, chairman and CEO of Grupo Globo.

== Early life ==
Roberto Irineu Marinho was born in Rio de Janeiro, RJ, the eldest son of three of the late tycoon Roberto Marinho.

== Career ==
Following the death of Roberto Marinho in August 2003 aged 98, his three sons inherited the control of Grupo Globo, Latin America's largest media group.

According to Forbes, Marinho has an estimated net worth of $3.8 billion as of March 2017.

== Personal life ==
Marinho is a Roman Catholic, married with four children, and lives in Rio de Janeiro.
