= 2019 São Paulo helicopter crash =

Aviation accident in Brazil

2019 São Paulo Bell 206B accident
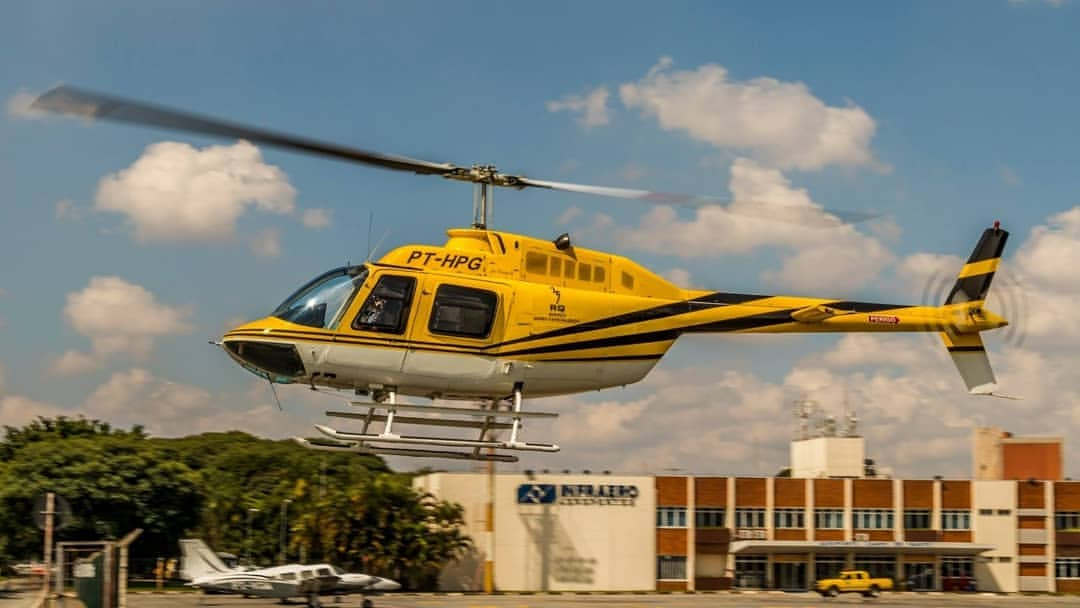
- PT-HPG, the Bell 206B involved in the accident

Accident
- Date: 11 February 2019
- Summary: Mechanical failure
- Site: São Paulo, São Paulo, Brazil; 23.451989°S 46.786984°W
- Total fatalities: 2
- Total injuries: 1

Aircraft
- Aircraft type: Bell 206B
- Operator: RQ Serviços Aéreos Especializados Ltda.
- Registration: PT-HPG
- Flight origin: Campinas, São Paulo, Brazil
- Destination: São Paulo, São Paulo, Brazil
- Occupants: 2
- Passengers: 1
- Crew: 1
- Fatalities: 2
- Survivors: 0

Ground casualties
- Ground fatalities: 0
- Ground injuries: 1

On 11 February 2019, a Bell 206B helicopter crashed while trying to land on the Rodoanel Mário Covas highway, following an unspecified malfunction. Among the victims was journalist Ricardo Boechat. The pilot, Ronaldo Quatrucci, was also killed and one person on the ground was injured. The aircraft crashed around 12:15 pm (UTC−02:00) and the journalist and pilot were pronounced dead shortly after. The helicopter was owned by RQ Serviços Aéreo Especializados Ltda.

== Aircraft ==
The aircraft was a Bell 206B, manufactured in 1975, registered PT-HPG. The pilot, Ronaldo Quatrucci, was one of the owners of the aerial shuttle company operating the aircraft.

== Accident ==
Journalist and news anchor Ricardo Boechat, from Rede Bandeirantes, was on his way to the head office of the broadcaster in São Paulo after speaking at an event for pharmaceutical company Libbs in Campinas, which is located about 100 km from the head offices. The helicopter crashed near kilometer 8 of the Rodoanel, on the Anhanguera highway, after attempting to make an emergency landing on one of the highway locks, following low-altitude flight and an unspecified malfunction. It collided with a semi truck unable to brake on time, burst into flames, and eventually exploded.

== Investigation ==
Preliminary information published by the National Civil Aviation Agency of Brazil (Anac) showed that the helicopter had a valid flight certificate until May 2023. However, RQ Serviços Aéreos Especializados Ltda was not authorized to provide air taxi services, only specialized air services such as aerial photography, airborne and aerial transport. Anac has announced that it has opened an investigation on the case. In 2011, RQ had paid a fine of 8,000 BRL (2506.74 USD) for offering panoramic flights without air taxi certification.

RQ Serviços Aéreos Especializados Ltda., owner of the helicopter, had been contracted by Zum Brazil, an event company that, in turn, rendered services to the pharmaceutical company Libbs, which promoted its annual sales agreement.

CENIPA (Aeronautical Accidents Investigation and Prevention Center) issued their investigation report in October 2020.

== Responses ==
- The Grupo Bandeirantes de Comunicação issued a note of regret after confirming the death of Boechat. Just like all vehicles in the group, the news were dealt with in extreme commotion. The presenter of Brasil Urgente, José Luiz Datena left the journal without saying goodbye completely shaken. In the Jornal da Band, the closure counted on the empty bench and a session of applause and shouts of staff of the editors of the stations of São Paulo, Rio de Janeiro and Brasília, besides a minute of silence after the display of the tributes. On BandNews FM radio, the broadcasts were suspended for a few minutes due to the emotion of the employees running only the looped vignette.
- A group of taxi drivers paid tribute to Boechat with a motorcade and "buzinaço" in the streets of São Paulo. Then, they stopped in front of the headquarters of the Grupo Bandeirantes, applauding the journalist and the group's employees.
- President of Brazil, Jair Bolsonaro published a note in his social networks for both Ricardo Boechat and Ronaldo Quatrucci, besides stating being admirer of the journalist, even he made critics about his government. Besides Bolsonaro, also regretted the death of the journalist and the pilot. Vice President of Brazil, Hamilton Mourão, the Governor of São Paulo, João Doria, and the Governor of Minas Gerais, Romeu Zema and the Planalto Palace's official account also published official notes.
- President of the Chamber of Deputies, Rodrigo Maia published an official note in Twitter, as did President of the Senate Davi Alcolumbre.
- The Supreme Federal Court, through its president, Minister Dias Toffoli, expressed regret for the death of the journalist.
- The Superior Court of Justice also published a note through its president, Minister João Otávio de Noronha.
- The National Confederation of Industry regretted Boechat's death through a note signed by President Robson Braga de Andrade.
- The Ministry of Justice and Public Security expressed solidarity to the journalist and Grupo Bandeirantes.
- The Brazilian Association of Radio and Television Broadcasters sent a note signed by Paulo Tonet Camargo, president of the association.
- Prosecutor General of the Republic Raquel Dodge regretted the death of the journalist also through an official note.
- TV host José Luiz Datena, Boechat's widow Veruska Seibel, Supreme Court Minister Luiz Fux, Electoral Court President Rosa Weber, TV hosts Luciano Huck and Serginho Groisman, Globo presenter Fátima Bernardes, writer Paulo Coelho, comedian Marcelo Adnet, journalists Vera Magalhães, Miriam Leitão, Aline Midlej, Ricardo Noblat, Rodolfo Schneider, Milton Neves and José Simão, radio broadcaster Milton Jung, priests Fábio de Melo and Marcelo Rossi, singer Daniela Mercury, commentator Walter Casagrande and many other personalities as singers, journalists, politicians, sportists, Brazilian soccer, volleyball and other modalities teams, actors and presenters of many broadcasters published tributes in the social networks.
- International press like BBC pointed out the accident in the main page and remembered Boechat as one of the most noble and respected journalists of the country, and that his death is a sad moment for the Brazilian journalism. Portuguese newspaper Correio da Manhã brought Boechat as "star of the brazilian journalism". Spanish newspaper El País highlighted Ricardo Boechat's death.
- In the social networks, fans of Silas Malafaia were satisfied with the death of Ricardo Boechat, using their religion, and Malafaia disapproves the fans' attitude saying that, he could even disagree with the journalist's opinions, but doesn't deny that he had great leadership.

== See also ==
- List of fatalities from aviation accidents
