= 2007 in radio =

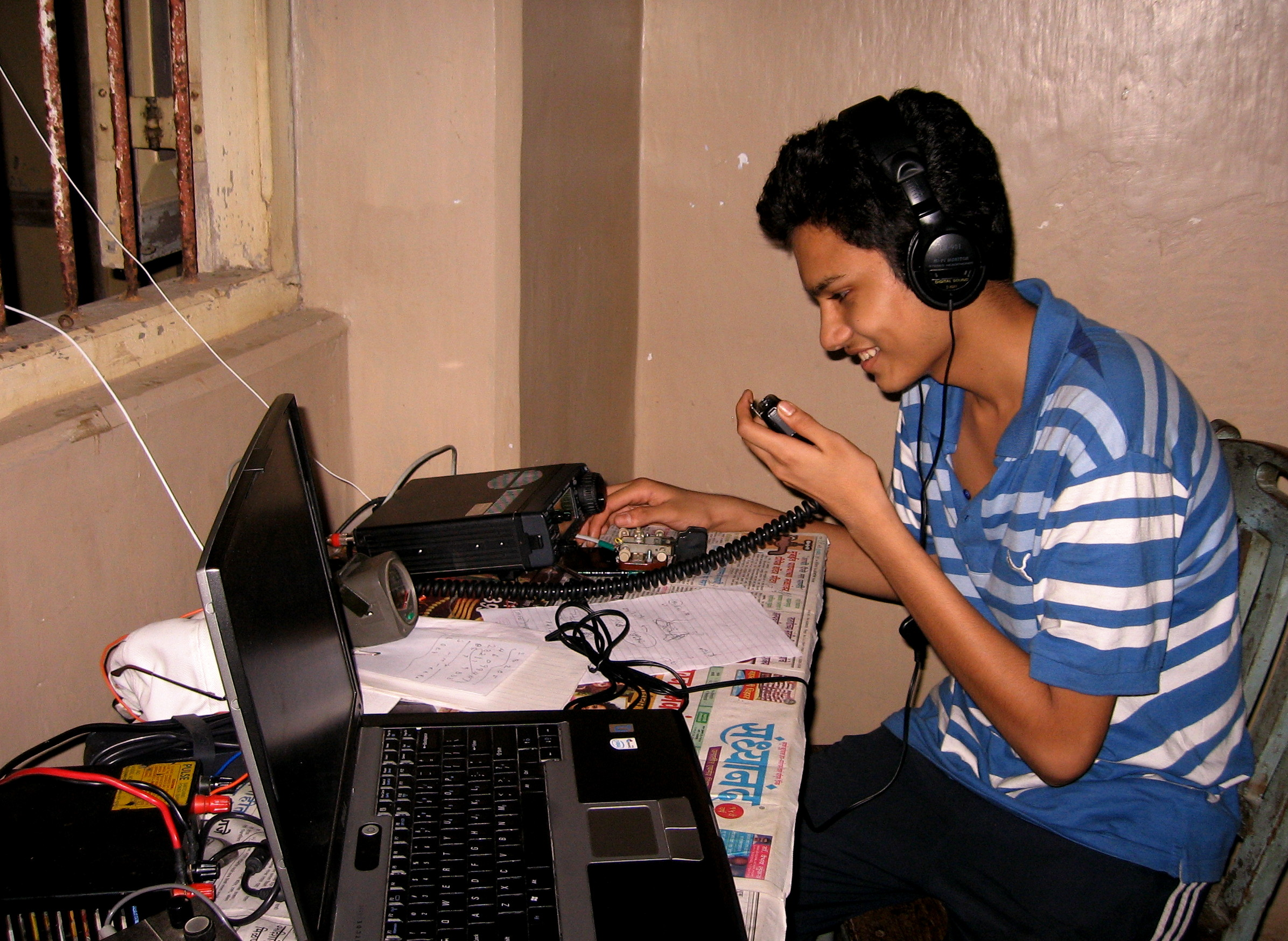
An Indian amateur radio operator on air in 2007.

The year 2007 in radio involved some significant events.

== Events ==
- January 8: Nanci "The Fabulous Sports Babe" Donnellan returns to radio after a six-year absence, filling in for local hosts in Florida.
- January 12: Entercom station KDND in Sacramento, California was sued after a participant in a "Hold Your Wee For a Wii" contest held by the station's morning show died of water intoxication.
- February 12: Two radio stations in Guinea, FM Liberté and Radio Familia, are attacked and besieged by members of the presidential guard.
- February 5: In Baghdad, Iraqi police find the murdered body of Abduirazak Hashim Ayal al-Khakani, a journalist employed by the news service of Jumhuriyat al-Iraq radio.
- February 12: Rádio Trânsito begins broadcasting from São Paulo, Brazil.
- March 2: WMMS-HD2 (100.7-2 FM), a digital subchannel of Cleveland rock station WMMS, launches with a "classic alternative" format.
- March 3: A number of format changes are announced at Cumulus Media-owned radio stations in the Quad Cities. WXLP (96.9 FM) begins using its former moniker, 97X, and is reborn as a classic hits-leaning towards classic rock format. The active rock format that had been at WXLP since 2004 (as "97 Rock") is moved to KBOB-FM (104.9 FM), which is rebranded "Rock 104.9." The 104.9 FM frequency's country music format, which had been there since 2000 and associated with the call letters KBOB since 1994, is abandoned, leaving Cumulus without a country music station in the Quad-Cities market.
- March 6: Air America Radio restructures, with politician Mark Green and his brother Stephen at the helm. Among the changes (see also "Closures"):
  - Sam Seder discontinues his weekday show and moves to Sunday afternoons on Air America Radio.
  - Lionel moves from WOR Radio Network to Air America Radio, joining the latter May 14.
- March 15: Lánchíd Rádió, a privately owned radio station in Hungary, begins broadcasting.
- March 22: CHUM Radio-O&O CKCE-FM/Calgary signs on as "Energy 101.5" with a Hot AC format.
- April 4: On Imus in the Morning: talk show host Don Imus refers on-air to the Rutgers University women's basketball team as "nappy-headed hos" and starts a national controversy about racism and free speech during comedy.
- April 12: The Imus in the Morning talk show is canceled by MSNBC, and host Don Imus is fired for remarks made about the Rutgers University women's basketball team. The controversy evolved into firing as a violation of the civil rights of free speech.
- June 12: Citadel Broadcasting's purchase of most ABC Radio assets closes, and restructuring takes place.
- June 22: WKBF (1270 AM) of Rock Island, Illinois, flips from Christian talk (as "Truth 1270") to "La Pantera," a Spanish and Mexican music format, following the frequency's sale from Quad Cities Media to La Jefa Latino Broadcasting. The station's new format allows WKBF to become the first full-time Spanish-language radio station in the Quad Cities and stabilizes the station's format, which had changed several times since 1995.
- June 29: Tom Kent resigns as host of his programs on the TKO Radio Network, the network he launched as a 24-hour network in the same year; he maintains ownership of the network and is replaced behind the microphone by John Landecker and Marty Thompson.
- July 1: Art Bell retires (again) from his weekend hosting gig at Coast to Coast AM.
- July 12: WCBS-FM 101.1 FM New York drops its Jack format after two years and returns to Oldies.
- July 16: Mike and the Mad Dog becomes "nationally syndicated" with its first affiliate outside New York State, WQYK in Tampa, Florida. According to host Mike Francesa, more affiliates are in the works.
- July 30: Pardon the Interruption returns to ESPN Radio.
- August 10: ABC Radio discontinues syndication of Larry Elder; his show continues on KABC in Los Angeles and reverts to a local show. All other affiliates are switched over to Mark Levin's show, also syndicated by ABC in the same time slot.
- August 16: Ocean FM, broadcasting in the Cayman Islands, loses its operating licence.
- August 17: Dan Patrick leaves his position at ESPN Radio.
- September 3: West German radio (Westdeutscher Rundfunk) programme Mozaik commemorates the 50th anniversary of Heinrich Böll's Irisches Tagebuch.
- September 4: Russia's government appoints a new prosecutor to take forward the trial of the murderers of journalist Anna Politkovskaya the previous year.
- October 1: Patrick returns on KLAC in Los Angeles and syndicated through the Content Factory.
- October 5: Long-time Pittsburgh CHR station "B94", returns to the air after flipping to rock (and later "male" talk) in 2004.
- October 8:
  - WEXM (formerly WNOU) in Indianapolis, Indiana changes to Christmas music, the first station in the country to do so, as a "stunt format" for the next three months. The first non-stunting stations to change over were KCKC in Kansas City and KOSY-FM in Salt Lake City, for the second year in a row, on the evening of October 31, among several other stations.
  - WZOO flips from CHR to Classic Hits with a new branding, "Magic 102.5."
- October 11: Government-run newspaper The New Light of Myanmar blames US-sponsored Radio Free Asia for inciting violent protest.
- October 12: 99.3 and 104.5 Kiss FM, a Hot Adult Contemporary simulcast in Northwest PA operated by Forever Media, flips to Majic 99.3 and 104.5 - a jockless Variety Hits format. The call letters switch from WOXX to WHMJ (99.3) and WXXO to WXMJ (104.5)
- October 26: It was announced that on November 3, WFUN would flip to ESPN Sports.
- October 29:
  - Astral Media takes over almost all of the former broadcasting assets of Standard Broadcasting in Canada.
  - San Diego's KLSD flips from Talk to Sports Talk.
- October 31:
  - The Greaseman resigns as host of WMET's morning show to focus on Internet ventures.
  - WWFT flips from Talk to Christmas music stunting until the end of the year.
- November 3:
  - WFUN flips from talk to ESPN Sports.
  - Roger Hedgecock assumes a position as the host of a national weekly talk show.
- November 7: Atlanta's WQXI opened their own 15,000-square-foot (1,400 m^{2}) sports bar in downtown Atlanta.
- November 16: The bNet NZ Music Awards are held for the 10th and last time, at the Hopetoun Alpha in Auckland, New Zealand, hosted by Matt Heath and Chris Stapp.
- November 19: WIAU transforms from Classic Hits to Talk introducing syndicated hosts such as Dr. Laura.
- November 27: Colorado West Broadcasting, Inc. sells KGLN to MBC Broadcasting for $250,000.
- November 30:
  - WMRN changes dial position from 106.9 to 106.7 at 12PM.
  - Entravision Communications buys WNUE from Mega Communications for $24 million.
- December: In the run-up to the 2007 Kenyan general election, the Kenya Broadcasting Corporation continues to campaign for the incumbent president, Mwai Kibaki, as do Citizen FM and other radio stations owned by Kibaki's associate, S. K. Macharia.
- December 3: Imus in the Morning is revived on WABC and the ABC Radio network.
- December 5: Controversial radio host J. R. Gach leaves the Internet and the airwaves after a lawsuit involving comments he made in February 2006 is settled for nearly a million dollars.
- December 21: Gary Burbank, WLW radio personality and voice of Earl Pitts, retires.
- December 13:
  - WFTK drops the talk format, stunting the entire day with construction sounds. The next day, they debuted an alternative rock format branded as 96 Rock.
  - WMRN changed formats from theme song stunting (before stunting, WMRN's format was country music) to alternative rock as "Radio 106.7" at 12PM.
- December 26: WIBC in Indianapolis, Indiana moves its news/talk format to 93.1 FM. The station's AM frequency flipped to sports as WFNI.
- date unknown: Global Radio is founded by Ashley Tabor-King, backed by his father Michael Tabor, and purchases a network of FM stations, including the Heart and Capital networks, Classic FM, XFM, Choice FM, Gold and Chill

== Debuts ==
- Casey Kasem's American Top 40: The 70s (January 1) and The 80s (April 8). Terrestrial syndication debut after several months exclusively on XM Satellite Radio.
- February 20: The Tony Kornheiser Show. This is the day that Kornheiser returned to radio on WTWP (now WWWT) and XM 144 after his first stint on Monday Night Football. The show will go on hiatus June 30 as Kornheiser returns for one more season on MNF.
- March: Filipinas, Ahora Mismo, daily cultural magazine show in Spanish
- March 26: The Dennis Miller Show, syndicated by Westwood One.
- April 1: Calendrier Sportif, 24-hour, French-language sports information radio station on XM Satellite Radio.
- April 2: Wil & Lehmo, afternoon drive time radio program broadcast nationally on Triple M in Australia.
- April 6: Tiësto's Club Life, weekly show hosted by Dutch DJ Tiësto on Radio 538.
- April 12: The Keith Sweat Hotel, syndicated by Premiere Radio Networks.
- April 16: Q, Canadian arts magazine show, broadcast on CBC Radio One.
- April: Libertarian Party presidential candidate Michael Badnarik begins hosting a talk radio program, Lighting the Fires of Liberty on the We the People radio network.
- Steve Malzberg. May 7. Returned to the airwaves in national syndication thanks to the WOR Radio Network.
- May 17: San Francisco classic hits station KFRC is revived on 106.9 FM. The format had previously been on 99.7 FM until it switched to the Movin' format in September 2006.
- June 25: The Phil Hendrie Show. Initially intended to be a more political and issues oriented program, the show quickly reverted to a format similar to its previous format.
- August 23: Bob Grant. Grant's sudden return to the network came one day after the official announcement of his rehiring.
- September 4: Boomer Esiason and Craig Carton in the Morning. Permanent replacement for Imus at WFAN.
- The Mike Tirico Show. September 20. Replacement for Dan Patrick on ESPN Radio.
- John Batchelor. October 7. Replaces Brian Whitman on WABC and returns to radio after his daily show, also on WABC (and later syndicated by ABC Radio), was cancelled in September 2006. Batchelor also debuts another three-hour show on KFI, dealing with the same topics, immediately after the WABC show.
- Live on Sunday Night with Bill Cunningham. October 7. Replaces Matt Drudge on Premiere Radio Networks.
- Michael Jackson. October 29. Debuts on KGIL in Los Angeles in his former time slot.

== Endings ==
- WWVA Jamboree/Jamboree USA'. January 6. The long-running country music show, which had aired since 1933 on WWVA/Wheeling, West Virginia, is canceled as the station streamlines its focus on its talk radio format. It will be revived in 2009 by crosstown talk station WKKX as WWVA's then-sister property Live Nation spins off the program - now renamed the Wheeling Jamboree - to a non-profit organization.
- The Al Franken Show. February 14. Franken left his show on Air America Radio to run for the U.S. Senate in Minnesota.
- Free FM. In a series of moves beginning in May 2007, CBS Radio phased out the hot talk network by changing several stations' formats and rebranding most others.
- CHUM Limited absorbed into CTVglobemedia June 22
- Classical music station WFMR in Milwaukee ends 51 years on the air when the station flips to a Smooth jazz format as WJZX June 26
- Adventures in Good Music: Producer and distributor WCLV announced "with great regret" that it would broadcast and syndicate its last encore episode of Adventures in Good Music with Karl Haas on June 29, 2007.
- July 1: Art Bell announces his retirement from weekend hosting, effective immediately, but will host occasional shows in the future.
- July 2: Utawarerumono Radio, Japan's first Internet radio show, ends its run on the broadcast station Oto Izumi.
- August 17: Greenstone Media. Women's talk network folds after slightly over a year on the air. The network only gained 8 affiliates in its short life.
- Washington Post Radio. September 19. The short-lived attempt at a long-form commercial all-news radio station in the style of NPR, run by The Washington Post, ended as Bonneville switches its network of stations to 3WT Talk Radio.
- Matt Drudge's Sunday night show. September 30. Drudge left the timeslot; Premiere Radio Networks replaced him with Bill Cunningham.
- ABC News & Talk. September 24. Closed by ABC Radio in restructuring.
- October 18: WPEP at Taunton, Massachusetts has its license canceled so WNSH-Beverly, Massachusetts can increase to 30 kW. They were on the same frequency: 1570 kHz.
- Satellite Sisters. November 9. Cancelled by ABC Radio in restructuring.
- Wake Up With Whoopi. November 30. The show, hosted by Whoopi Goldberg, was cancelled by WKTU in New York City after low ratings.
- Doug Hoerth. December 3. Renda Broadcasting, owners of WPTT in Pittsburgh, announce they are not renewing Hoerth's contract after a ten-year run as the station's morning and later afternoon host.
- December 20 - After three years as "Diva 92.3" WDVW in New Orleans flips from Rhythmic/Dance to Adult Top 40 as "Mix 92.3."
- John London's Inferno. December 25. The show failed in syndication due to a lack of affiliates.

== Deaths ==
- 3 January: János Fürst, 71, Hungarian violinist and conductor, former member of the Radio Éireann Symphony Orchestra
- 8 January: Yvonne De Carlo, 84, Canadian actress
- 2 February: Gian Carlo Menotti, 95, Italian composer, works include an opera for radio
- 6 February: Frankie Laine, 93, US singer and radio performer
- 9 February: Benedict Kiely, 87, Irish writer and broadcaster
- April: Vida Jane Butler, 84, radio announcer, voice-over artist, also known as "Janie Joplin"
- 12 March: Betty Hutton, 86, actress and singer, radio star
- 1 April: Herb Carneal, 83, American sportscaster, radio broadcaster for Minnesota Twins MLB team, congestive heart failure
- 14 April: Mike Webb, 41. American radio host at KIRO, known for his extreme liberal viewpoints. Killed by an axe murderer.
- 12 June: Ann Colone, 77, Fort Wayne, Indiana broadcaster
- 13 June: Sir David Hatch, 68, BBC Radio producer and comedian
- 12 July: Stan Zemanek, Australian radio broadcaster, 60
- 20 July: Pete Wilson, 62, long-serving talk show host at KGO.
- 13 August: Phil Rizzuto, 89, American baseball player, Hall of Fame inductee and sports broadcaster, pneumonia
- 30 August: K. P. H. Notoprojo, 98, Javanese gamelan player and composer
- 9 September: Paul Sullivan, 50, overnight host at WBZ
- 11 September: Joe Zawinul, 75, Austrian jazz musician and member of Cannonball Adderley's group
- 15 September: Aldemaro Romero, 79, Venezuelan pianist, composer, arranger and orchestral conductor
- 24 September: Geoff Cannell, 65, Manx Member of the House of Keys and sports broadcaster, stroke
- 1 October
  - Chris Mainwaring, 41, Australian footballer for the West Coast Eagles, television and radio sports journalist
  - Ned Sherrin, 76, British broadcaster and theatre producer
- 2 October: Tawn Mastrey, 53, American radio disc jockey (KNAC), hepatitis C
- 30 October: Robert Goulet, 73, French-Canadian singer, actor and former radio announcer
- 15 November: Joe Nuxhall, 79, American baseball player and broadcaster (Cincinnati Reds), pneumonia and multiple cancers.
- 5 December: Karlheinz Stockhausen, German avant-garde composer and frequent radio performer, 79
- 25 December: Pat Kirkwood, 86, British actress and singer
