= Carlos Nascimento (journalist) =

Brazilian journalist

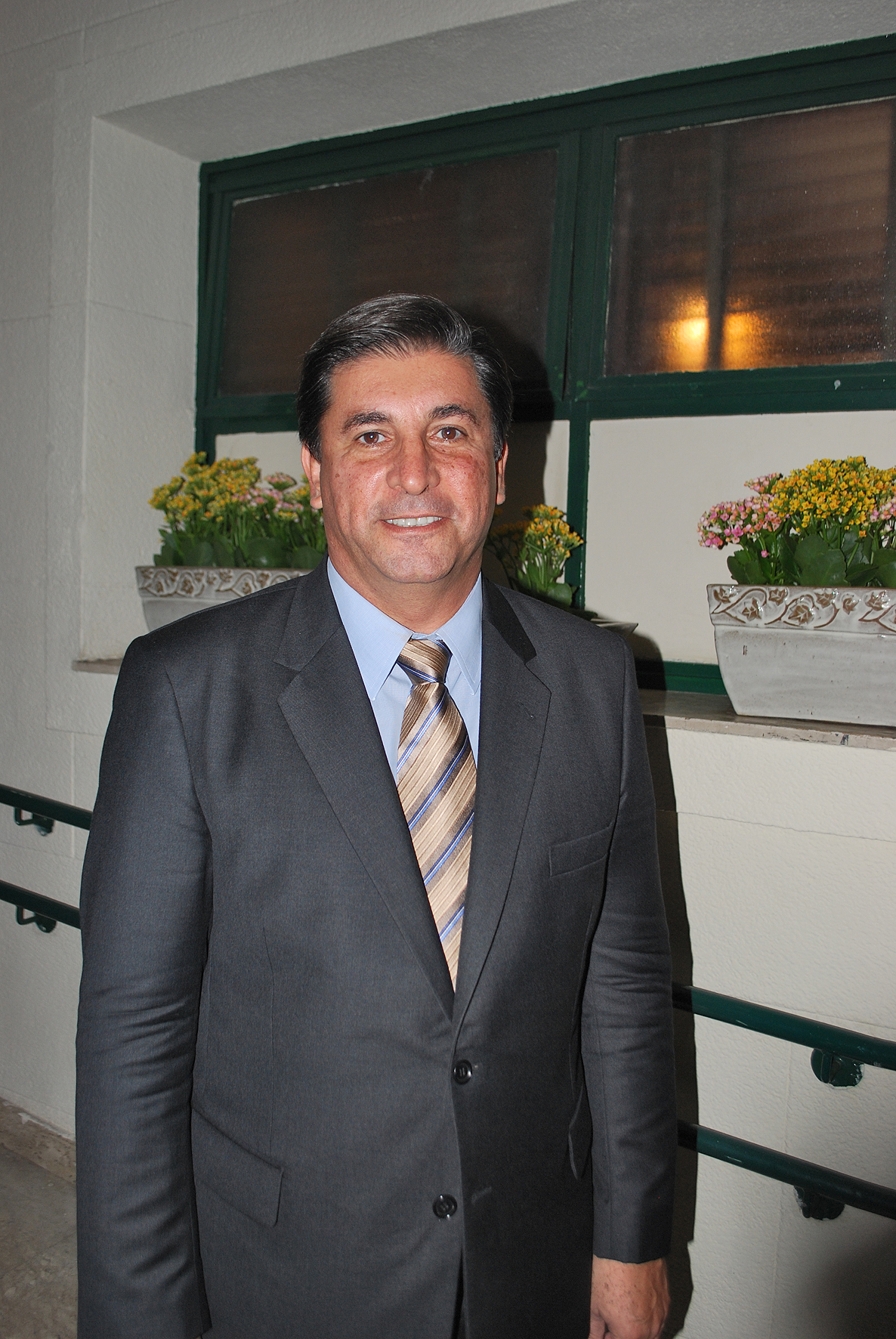
- Nascimento in 2009
- Born: Carlos Alberto Suriano do Nascimento; 5 December 1954 (age 71); Dois Córregos, São Paulo, Brazil
- Education: Faculdade Cásper Líbero (B.J.)
- Occupation: Journalist
- Years active: 1977–present
- Employers: Rede Globo (1977–1988; 1990–2004); TV Cultura (1988–1989); RecordTV (1989–1990); Band (2004–2006); SBT (2006–2020)

Carlos Alberto Suriano do Nascimento (born 5 December 1954), professionally known as Carlos Nascimento, is a Brazilian journalist, known for reporting on major events in Brazil and the world, such as the September 11 attacks, being a major host of the broadcast in Rede Globo.

== Biography ==
Carlos Nascimento was born in Dois Córregos, where he began working as a radio host at Rádio Cultura and newspaper O Democrático. In São Paulo, he worked in radios Nacional, Excelsior, América and newspaper Super News. He was a commentator in newspapers Diário Popular and Diário de São Paulo.

Receiving a Bachelor of Journalism at Faculdade Cásper Líbero, Nascimento began working on TV in 1977 at Rede Globo. He worked for 11 years at the Globo location in São Paulo, where he was a reporter for Bom Dia São Paulo, Globo Rural, Globo Repórter and Jornal Nacional. His popularity began to rise during the coverage of the death of President-elect Tancredo Neves, in 1985.

In 1988, Nascimento debuted as a TV news anchor in TV Cultura, hosting Jornal da Cultura. One year later, Nascimento was hired by RecordTV and, in 1990, returned to Rede Globo, becoming the first anchor to appear on this broadcaster's coverage. He also anchored São Paulo Já/SPTV until 1998, and from 1999 and on, he presented Jornal Hoje, before eventual becoming an anchor of Jornal Nacional and Fantástico. His final day presenting in Globo was on 31 January 2004. On the same day, he left the broadcaster and was hired by Bandeirantes.

On 15 March 2004, Nascimento debuted as anchor of Jornal da Band, in Rede Bandeirantes. Besides the TV news show, he also presented a daily program in BandNews FM and made comments about politics and economy in BandNews TV and Rádio Bandeirantes.

In February 2006, Carlos Nascimento left Band and worked on SBT's journalism team for four years. In May 2011, after more than 5 years with the TV broadcaster, Nascimento left SBT Brasil to be replaced by Joseval Peixoto and Rachel Sheherazade but remained as an anchor on Jornal do SBT with Cynthia Benini. A year later, he anchored with Karyn Bravo, as Benini left for personal reasons.

In 2012, he presented O Maior Brasileiro de Todos os Tempos. In September 2013, Nascimento took a medical leave for treatment of colorectal cancer.

On 12 May 2014, Nascimento returned to television and began anchoring SBT Brasil, replacing Joseval Peixoto, who was on vacation. Despite his cancer, Nascimento was still in a good mood. He was well received by fellow journalist Rachel Sheherazade. "I hope I do everything right to honour what you're talking about", joked Nascimento. Nascimento anchored SBT Brasil until April 2020, at the peak of the COVID-19 pandemic in Brazil, when he took an absence leave for being part of the risk group. His contract was not renewed when it expired in December 2020.

== Works ==
Year	Títle	Role	Broadcaster
1980–1982	Globo Rural	Host	Rede Globo
1984–1988	SPTV 1ª Edição	Anchor	Rede Globo
1986–1988	Bom Dia São Paulo	Anchor	Rede Globo
1986–1988	Jornal Nacional	Eventual anchor	Rede Globo
1988–1989	Jornal da Cultura	Anchor	TV Cultura
1989–1990	Jornal da Record	Anchor	RecordTV
1990	SPTV 2ª Edição	Anchor	Rede Globo
1990–1996	São Paulo Já	Anchor	Rede Globo
1990–2003	Jornal Nacional	Eventual anchor	Rede Globo
1996–1998	SPTV 2ª Edição	Anchor	Rede Globo
1997–1998	Espaço Aberto	Host	GloboNews
1998–1999	Bom Dia São Paulo	Anchor	Rede Globo
1999–2004	Jornal Hoje	Anchor	Rede Globo
2004–2006	Jornal da Band	Anchor	Rede Bandeirantes
2006	Jornal do SBT	Anchor	SBT
2006	SBT São Paulo	Anchor	SBT
2006–2011	SBT Brasil	Anchor	SBT
2007	SBT Manchetes	Anchor	SBT
2011–2013	Jornal do SBT	Anchor	SBT
2012	O Maior Brasileiro de Todos os Tempos	Host	SBT
2014–2020	SBT Brasil	Anchor	SBT

== Notable events ==
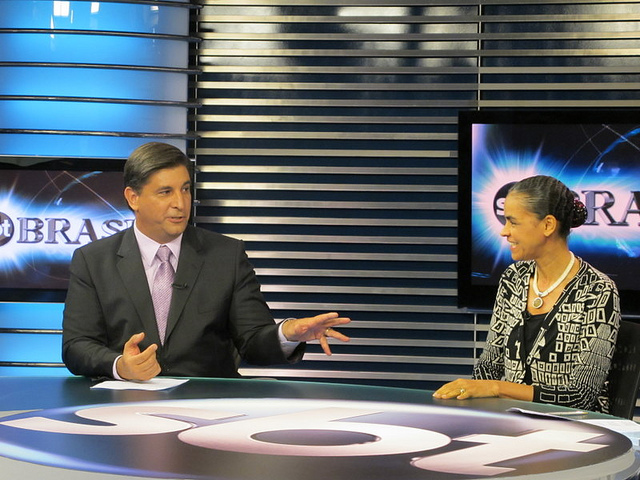
Nascimento interviews Marina Silva during the 2010 elections.

Nascimento was a part of many noteworthy journalistic coverages, most notably during the 2000s, when he covered the September 11 attacks and the capture of Saddam Hussein live. These coverages include coverage of the following:

- Floodings in Minas Gerais and Espírito Santo in 1979;
- Riot in Jacareí prison in 1981, for which he was awarded the Franz de Castro Holzwarth Award;
- Funeral of President-elect Tancredo Neves in 1985;
- Impeachment trial of President Fernando Collor de Mello in 1992;
- Funeral of Brazilian Formula One pilot Ayrton Senna in 1994;
- Brazil national football team's return to Brazil after winning the 1994 FIFA World Cup;
- Inauguration of President Fernando Henrique Cardoso in 1995;
- Funeral of the members of the band Mamonas Assassinas, killed in an air crash in Serra da Cantareira, São Paulo, in 1996;
- TAM Flight 402 crash in Jabaquara, São Paulo, in 1996;
- Funeral of Diana, Princess of Wales in London in 1997;
- Funeral of Governor of São Paulo Mario Covas in 2001;
- Kidnapping of Sílvio Santos in 2001;
- September 11 attacks in 2001;
- Inauguration of President Luiz Inácio Lula da Silva in 2003;
- Iraq War in 2003;
- Opening ceremony of the 2004 Summer Olympics in Athens;
- TAM Flight 3054 crash in Congonhas Airport, in São Paulo, 2007;
- 2008 United States presidential election;
- Air France Flight 447 crash on the Atlantic Ocean in 2009;
- Death of Michael Jackson in 2009;
- Funeral of TV presenter Hebe Camargo in 2012;
- Funeral of Mexican comedian Roberto Gómez Bolaños in 2014;
- First exclusive interview with President Jair Bolsonaro after his inauguration in 2019.

== Awards ==
During his successful career, Nascimento received many awards, among them the Vladimir Herzog Award, granted by the São Paulo State Journalists Union in 1980 and 1981; and APCA Award of the São Paulo Association of Art Critics in 1988 for Best TV News (Jornal da Cultura) and in 1989 in the same category (Jornal da Record). In 2005, he was granted the award "Comunique-se", after being chosen by more than 80,000 journalists as the best anchor of Brazilian television.
