= Joelmir Beting =

- Born: Joelmir José Beting; December 21, 1936; Tambaú, SP, Brazil
- Died: November 29, 2012 (aged 75); São Paulo, Brazil
- Education: University of São Paulo
- Occupations: Journalist; Anchorman; Columnist
- Spouse: Lucila Beting
- Children: 2
- Website: joelmirbeting.com.br

Joelmir José Beting (December 21, 1936 – November 29, 2012) was a Brazilian journalist, radio and TV anchorman, and an economics-specialized columnist. He was widely recognized for his ability to translate the harsh, confusing economical concepts (usually called by the jargon economês in Portuguese, meaning the economists' talking resembles a foreign language) into simple, easy to understand examples for the people in general.

== Personal life ==
His family came from the Westphalia region, Germany, to work in a farm in Limeira, São Paulo. Later they moved to Tambaú, another city in São Paulo, where Joelmir has born.

He started working as a low-waged farmworker (Portuguese: bóia fria) when he was 7 years old. Thanks to the efforts of Father Donizetti Tavares de Lima, he moved to São Paulo in 1955, following his advice to learn sociology and work as a journalist.

=== Academic life ===
He attended the Social Sciences classes at the University of São Paulo and earned his undergraduate degree, aiming first to make a career as a teacher. His thesis was The adaptation of Northeast Brazilians' manpower in the auto industry, having Fernando Henrique Cardoso as one of his advisors.

== Career ==
While attending the university, he sought for jobs at radio stations and newspaper publishers, and succeeded to work for newspapers O Esporte and Diário Popular, and Rádio Panamericana (now Rádio Jovem Pan) as well, making sports journalism. However, he decided to quit the sports coverage after a soccer match between Sociedade Esportiva Palmeiras and Sport Club Corinthians Paulista. As a fanatic Palmeiras supporter, he manifested a biased behaviour during the play he was covering and decided to ask his dismissal after the game.

Due to his successful undergraduate thesis, he was invited in 1966 to become a columnist at Folha de S. Paulo newspaper, to edit a column about automobiles, specially the automotive industry. That was the chance for him to embrace the economics path on his career, being nominated in 1968 as editor of the economics' section. He started his daily column in that newspaper on January 7, 1970, being also distributed to more than 50 other newspapers throughout the country.

In 1970 he started to broadcast daily economical analysis on Rádio Jovem Pan and TV Record. He moved to Rede Bandeirantes in 1974, working in both radio and television stations. Alongside Salomão Ésper and José Paulo de Andrade, he joined the first team to air Jornal da Bandeirantes Gente, a daily radio program for Rádio Bandeirantes de São Paulo – AM 840 kHz.

In 1985 he left Rede Bandeirantes to work at Organizações Globo, especially TV Globo. He already was a columnist for O Globo since 1979. He also worked for Globo News channel and Rádio CBN.

He moved his newspaper column to O Estado de S. Paulo on May 1, 1991, where he stayed up to December 3, 2003

=== The Bradesco Issue ===
In 2003, he agreed to make an advertisement campaign for Bank Bradesco, posing for advertising pieces of HiperFundo Bradesco, a mutual fund. Due to his decision, the newspapers O Estado de S. Paulo and O Globo decided to stop the publication of his column, allegedly because the fact his economical columnist to advertise a financial product was incompatible with their policies.

He defeated those allegations in an article called "May I Talk?" (Posso Falar?, in Portuguese). He stated his relationships with the newspapers was not of an employee but as a supplier of a single product, "stated as of good quality, clean and free", therefore not tied to the newspapers' policies. (Note: Original text: "Minha relação com cada um dos jornais não é de empregado. É de fornecedor de um produto isolado. Produto tido de boa qualidade, limpo e isento. Não tenho por contrato de seguir normas de redação ou de conduta de nenhum dos jornais signatários.") Furthermore, he questions supposed false questions that arose from the fact, stating "If journalism gets ashamed from advertisement – then it should survive without it", (Note: Original text: "Se o jornalismo se envergonha da publicidade – que trate de sobreviver sem ela.") to conclude saying "To advertise a mutual fund, a new car, or toothpaste doesn't harm people. What endangers the Brazilian people in journalism (and throws the profession's ethics in the dirt) is the old, and even celebrated, journalistic merchandising, with political, partisan, ideological, cultural, religious or militant nature." (Note: Original text: "Anunciar fundo mútuo, carro zero ou creme dental não faz mal à população. O que, no jornalismo, coloca o povo brasileiro em perigo (e a ética da profissão, na sarjeta) é o antigo e até festejado merchandising jornalístico de caráter político, partidário, ideológico, cultural, religioso, militante.")

=== Return to Bandeirantes ===
He went back to Rede Bandeirantes in 2004, to be the anchorman of Jornal da Band, along with Carlos Nascimento and Mariana Ferrão, and to Rádio Bandeirantes as well, rebuilding the same original formation of Jornal da Bandeirantes Gente.

He also presented Canal Livre, an interview program broadcast on Sunday nights, as well took participations on Band News television and FM radio, and Bandeirantes' BandSports channel as well.

== Death ==
He was diagnosed with an autoimmune vasculitis and hospitalized on October 22, 2012, at Albert Einstein Hospital. He would ultimately suffer a cerebrovascular accident on November 25, 2012, dying on November 29, 2012.

His last homage was paid at Cemitério do Morumbi, before his cremation.

=== His son's letter in homage ===
Joelmir Beting's son, Mauro Beting, was on air in Rádio Bandeirantes featuring a post-game radio program after São Paulo FC v. CD Universidad Católica match when he was warned about his father's death. Immediately he started to read a letter in homage to him, as reproduced here:

"I have never talked to my father about it after Palmeiras has been downgraded. But I knew he has learned it. Or imagined it. What I know is the first Sunday after falling to the 2nd Division for the second time, Mr. Joelmir had a stroke before to watch the first match after the downgrading. He made a tomography early in the morning. In some minutes the doctor (a fanatic Corinthians supporter) said another giant could no longer rise again.

In the day after to the diabolic second-class division my father started to go to Heaven. The chances to recover from an autoimmune disease were not so good. They became almost impossible with the bleeding of his privileged brain. Irrigated and ventilated as too few among those who know and recognize him. Beloved and cherished for those not too few that had the privilege to know him.

My father.

The best father a journalist can be. The best journalist a son can have as a father.

Do I need to say anything else to the best Babbo in the world that turned to be the best Nonno in the Universe?

I need. But I don't know. Usually he knew everything. When he didn't knew, he invented with the same class as he talked what he knew. Every father looks like that to his son. But a journalist's father to someone which is also a journalist gets even more orphan. I have never seen my father as a super-hero. Only as a super human. But I could never realize he would get ill and weak in flesh. I have never admitted we could lose the one that made us only gain.

Because of that I have ever believed in my father and his team. Ours.

He taught me so many things I couldn't describe them. One of them is, not all words are needed to be said. They should only be thought. Those who talks about what thinks, doesn't think about what he talks. Those who feels what he talks doesn't need to say it.

But, today, I need to thank for my 46 years. For the 49 years of love from my mother. For his 75 years.

More than everything, for the affection from the people that know him – therefore like him. And specially for the people who don't know him – and some who cried like he was an old friend.

I've learned a thing from you, babbo. Before become a great journalist it is needed to be a great person. I have learned from him I don't need to work to be a great professional. I need to try to be a great person. As you did both.

Excuse me, but I won't cry. I cry for everything. Because of that I always cry for the family. Palmeiras, loves, pains, colours, songs.

But I won't cry for everything more than anything in the world, my parents. My parents (which could be also called my mothers (Note: The word for parents in Portuguese is "pais", which is also plural to "pai", father, therefore implicitly addressing to the masculine person.)) were always ready. A gift from God. My father never missed me even when absent by his work. I never missed him because he had that wonderful woman, Mrs. Lucila. According to Mr. Joelmir, the second biggest thing in his life. Because the first one always was his love he felt for her since 1960. When they met at Rádio 9 de Julho. When they became a family. My brother and I. Sons of the radio.

Sons of a pioneer, respected economics' journalist, a recognized, innovator TV anchorman, a communication master, brilliant and labourer.

My father.

I always knew I would never be in my profession nothing even closer he was. Because too few were too good in his field. Fewer could be too good fathers as he was. Even fewer were too good husbands. Even extremely fewer were too good-spirited people. And there isn't any existing word to describe how rare and dedicated Palmeiras fan he was.

(But it is always worth remember that Palmeiras fans don't compare themselves. They're not more. They're not less. They're Palmeiras fans. That's enough.)

As he said on the announcement day of the new arena, in 2007, as it has been written in Palestra's locker room from 2008 to the overhaul: "To explain the emotion to be a Palmeiras fan, to another Palmeiras fan, is simply unnecessary. And to those who aren't, is simply impossible!"

To explain who is Joelmir Beting is unnecessary. To explain what is my father no longer belonging to this world is impossible.

Nonno, thanks for loving Nonna. Nonna, thanks for loving Nonno.

The sons of this love will never be orphans.

As I've officially been told now, 1:15 on this Thursday, November 29. 32 years and a week after my Nonno's death, father of my warrior Lucila.

Joelmir José Beting was bound to meet the Father of the Ball, Waldemar Fiume, in this Thursday at 0:55."
