= Miriam Leitão =

Brazilian journalist and television presenter

Míriam Leitão
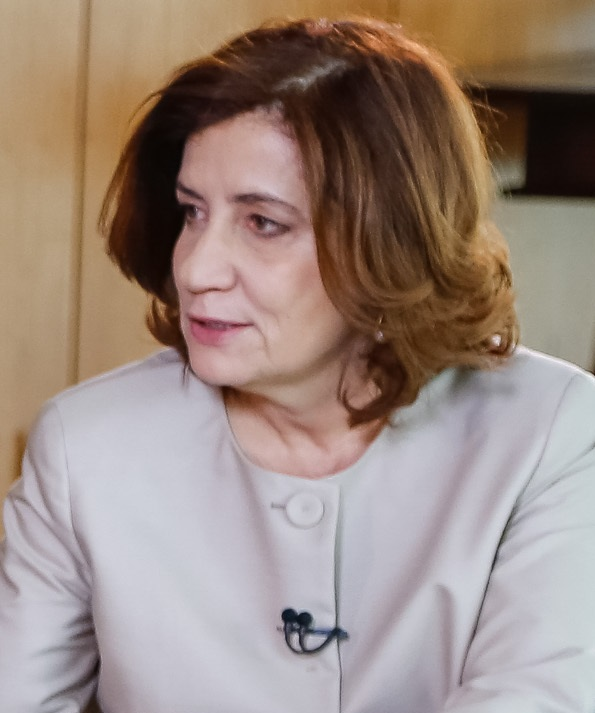
- Born: Míriam Azevedo de Almeida Leitão; 7 April 1953 (age 73); Caratinga, Minas Gerais, Brazil
- Education: University of Brasília
- Occupations: journalist, writer, television presenter
- Spouse: Sérgio Abranches

Miriam Azevedo de Almeida Leitão (born 7 April 1953) is a Brazilian journalist and television presenter. She has a program at GloboNews and is a commentator on economics at TV Globo's Bom Dia Brasil and writes the column Panorama Econômico in the newspaper O Globo. She is the mother of two sons, Vladimir Netto (1973) and Matheus Leitão (1977).

== Life and career ==
Leitão was born in Caratinga, Minas Gerais, to Dona Mariana and Reverendo Uriel de Almeida Leitão. She has a degree in journalism from Universidade de Brasília. She started her career in Vitória, Espírito Santo, and worked at several news outlets, on print, radio and television, such as Gazeta Mercantil, Jornal do Brasil, Veja, O Estado de S. Paulo, O Globo, Rádio CBN, Globo News and Rede Globo. She was reporter on diplomatic affairs at Gazeta Mercantil and editor of the economics desk at Jornal do Brasil. Leitão is the mother of two sons, Vladimir Netto, born in 1973 and a journalist, as well as Matheus Leitão, born in 1977 and also a journalist.

Since 1991 she works at Organizações Globo, first writing a column at the economy section of O Globo. In 1996, Leitão became the commentator on economics at Jornal Hoje together with Fátima Bernardes. After leaving Jornal Hoje, Leitão became Bom Dia Brasil's economics commentator, substituting Ana Paula Padrão. In 2003, she became the host of GloboNews' Espaço Aberto Economia, in place of Joelmir Beting.

Leitão was active in the student movement and was a member of the Communist Party of Brazil in the early 1970 decade, during the military dictatorship in Brazil. In 1972, she was imprisoned and tortured by military agents; Leitão was pregnant at the time.

On 30 April 2025, she was elected to occupy the Chair number 7 at the Brazilian Academy of Letters, in succession to Carlos Diegues.

== Comments, opinions, and analysis ==
Miriam Leitão, as an economist at TV Globo, on March 8, 2022, in the midst of the energy crisis in Europe, made a comment about fuel prices in the country: — I know you must be thinking “it is hard to pay the price of gasoline ”. In the rest of the world, it's been going up every week, okay? Here in Brazil, it's been a long time without fuel prices rising. And this, which can help the person who is struggling to fill the tank, also benefits very rich with big car and uses much more fuel. And that increases injustice — according to Miriam, the drop in fuel prices is a fact that increases injustice.

During the International Financial Crisis, on June 29, 2009, Miriam Leitão wrote the following about the then Minister Guido Mantega's growth forecast of 4.5% of 2010 GDP: “He made a statement that in 2010 Brazil is prepared to grow 4.5%. It is foolhardy to say that”. In fact, the high growth of 7.5% that year was above the GDP potential and made inflation move away from the center of the target during the entire term of President Dilma Rousseff. Also in 2009, Miriam Leitão warned that the strong loans given by BNDES to the group led by Eike Batista were not healthy for the economy and exposed the bank to the risks of a few large groups. In 2013, several companies of the group entered into bankruptcy.

== Books published ==
- Convém Sonhar (2010)
- Saga Brasileira: A longa luta de um povo por sua moeda (2011)
- A Perigosa Vida dos Passarinhos Pequenos (2013)
- Tempos Extremos (2014)
- A Menina de Nome Enfeitado (2014)
- Flávia e o Bolo de Chocolate (2015)
- História do Futuro: O horizonte do Brasil no século XXI (2015)
- A Verdade é Teimosa: Diários da Crise que Adiou o Futuro (2017)
- Refúgio no Sábado (2018)
- A Democracia na Armadilha: Crônicas do Desgoverno (2021)
- Amazônia na Encruzilhada: O poder da destruição e o tempo das possibilidades (2023)

== Awards ==
- Jornalismo para Tolerância - 2003 (Federação Internacional de Jornalistas – FIJ)
- Orilaxé - 2003 (Grupo AfroReggae)
- Ayrton Senna de Jornalismo Econômico - 2004
- Camélia da Liberdade - 2005 (Ceap – Centro de Articulação de Populações Marginalizadas)
- Maria Moors Cabot Prize - 2005 (Columbia University)
- Jornalista Econômico 2007, awarded by Ordem dos Economistas do Brasil
- Prêmio Jabuti - 2012, Non-fiction Book of the Year and Long-form journalism book, for "Saga brasileira: a longa luta de um povo por sua moeda"
- Most admired journalist of Brazil, together with Ricardo Boechat - 2014
- ANJ Freedom of Press Award.- 2017
