= Band Internacional =

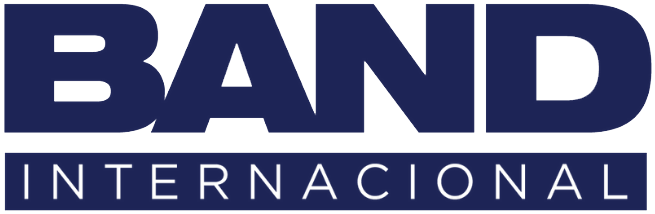
- Country: Brazil
- Broadcast area: List: Canada; Japan; Angola; Argentina; Mozambique; Paraguay; Indonesia; Uruguay
- Network: Rede Bandeirantes
- Headquarters: São Paulo (SP)

Programming
- Language: Portuguese
- Picture format: 480i (SDTV); 576i (SDTV)

Ownership
- Owner: Grupo Bandeirantes de Comunicação
- Key people: Johnny Saad (president)
- Sister channels: Band TV; BandSports; BandNews TV; Arte 1 Terra Viva

History
- Launched: 29 June 2007; 18 years ago

Links
- Website: bandinternacional.band.uol.com.br

Availability

Streaming media
- Sling TV: Internet Protocol television

Band Internacional is a Pay-TV channel of the Brazilian conglomerate Bandeirantes, for Brazilians living abroad.

== Launch and content ==
The channel is currently available in five countries: United States (the first country of reach, in which it was launched in 2007 until its shutdown in 2024), Angola and Mozambique (2009), Paraguay (2011), Argentina and Uruguay (2016), Indonesia and Japan (2024).

The channel has a differentiated programming for transmitting programs also of channels BandSports, BandNews TV and Arte 1; all issuers belonging to the Grupo Bandeirantes; besides the signal of Band TV.

Band News Internacional also available in Rogers Cable (nationwide) on channel 177 replacement of former channel line up Russia Today (RT) in 2024 12 midnight.

== TV shows ==
- Conexão Imigração Internacional (formerly Conexão Imigração USA) hosted by Immigration Attorney Renata Castro, Esq. (January 2023 – present)

== Correspondents ==
- New York - Eduardo Barão
- Paris - Sonia Blota and Tiago Leme
- London - Felipe Kieling
