= Donizetti Tavares de Lima =

Brazilian Roman Catholic priest

Blessed Donizetti Tavares de Lima
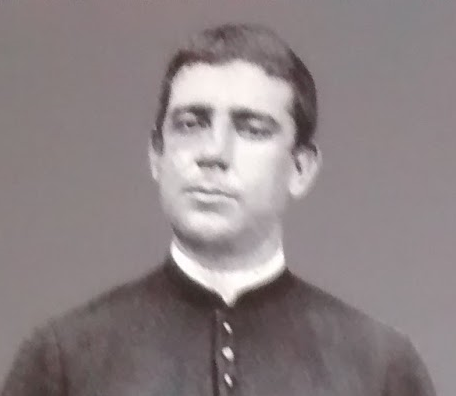
- Fr. Donizetti circa 1920.

Priest
- Born: 3 January 1882; Cássia, Minas Gerais, Brazil
- Died: 16 June 1961 (aged 79); Tambaú, São Paulo, Brazil
- Venerated in: Roman Catholic Church
- Beatified: 23 November 2019, Tambaú, Brazil by Cardinal Giovanni Angelo Becciu
- Feast: 16 June
- Attributes: Priest's cassock

Donizetti Tavares de Lima (3 January 1882 – 16 June 1961) was a Brazilian Catholic priest.

Tavares de Lima was ordained to the priesthood in 1908 and served as a parish priest in various churches across Brazil but was noted for his extensive work at the San Antonio church in Tambaú where he lived most of his life. He was famed for his reported miracles and other wonders that began around the 1920s and continued until his death. But this produced some consternation in the local bishop who, in 1955, ordered him to give one final blessing to the public and then to retreat to normal parish duties with no more talk of miracles or healings. He did so in obedience and continued to exercise his functions as a parish priest until his death.

The priest had been hailed as a saint his lifetime, and efforts to launch a beatification process started in 1991. The cause opened towards the decade's end and he became titled as a Servant of God. Pope Francis confirmed his heroic virtue on 9 October 2017 and named him as Venerable. Francis also signed a decree on 6 April 2019 that recognized a miracle attributed to his intercession, which made it possible for him to be beatified in Tambaú on 23 November 2019.

== Life ==
=== Childhood and education ===
Donizetti Tavares de Lima was born in 1882 in Minas Gerais to Tristão and Francisca Cândida Tavares de Lima. He had eight brothers. His father worked in law and his mother worked as a professor. In his childhood in 1886 the Tavares de Limas family relocated to Franca in São Paulo where Donizetti attended school and learned music.

In 1894 he commenced his ecclesial studies where he soon became the organist at the institute where he studied and later started to teach music to the seminarians. He had asked his father for permission to become a priest. In 1897 he moved to a college to further his education but later returned to teach music to seminarians. In 1900 he commenced a law course and in 1903 commenced his philosophical and theological formation in preparation for the priesthood.

=== Priesthood ===
He received his ordination as a priest on 12 July 1908 from the Bishop of Pouso Alegre and was incardinated into the Pouso Alegre diocese. He began work in the San Gaetano parish and then spent time in the Campinas diocese where he served as a vicar.

In 1909 he was appointed as the parish priest for the Sant'Ana church Vargem Grande do Sul in the Ribeirão Preto diocese where he defended the rights of the poor. This staunch advocacy for the poor led to the rich and his other detractors to accuse him of being a communist. He also helped construct chapels to Nossa Senhora Aparecida and to Saint Benedict of Nursia. He was stationed at the Sant'Ana church from 20 April to 8 August 1909 before being transferred once again. On 24 May 1926 he was appointed as the newest parish priest for the church of San Antonio in Tambaú. He arrived in the town on 12 June and was inaugurated at the parish with his first Mass there on 13 June. It was there that he oversaw the establishment of the Saint Vincent de Paul sanatorium for the abandoned and for elderly people who lived alone. The first "miracle" attributed to him was said to have occurred in 1927: torrential rain threatened a procession of a statue of Nossa Senhora Aparecida but the storm subsided and was quieted when Tavares de Lima led the procession himself.

In 1955 the local bishop grew concerned with the number of people reporting miracles attributed to him and the fanaticism associated with him. Tavares de Lima himself took the chance to stamp out this fanaticism but the bishop decided to put an end to pilgrimages to the famed priest and requested he continue his functions as a parish priest and speak no more of these rumors of healings. On 30 May 1955 – upon the bishop's orders – he gave his last public blessing to the crowds gathered outside of the church. Airplanes flew overhead and poured a shower of rose petals down to the ground to mark the occasion. In 1960 the Archbishop of Ribeirão Preto and the priest Agmar de Paula Marques went to visit him in his parish. The moment the priest saw the pair he told the archbishop of a terrible nightmare he had of a demon appearing when the altar of the church was removed and how the church's patron, Saint Anthony of Padua had repelled it. The archbishop assured him that it was just a nightmare but Tavares de Lima insisted a darkness was growing. The archbishop then reassured him that he would not allow such a thing to pass.

Local officials came to him to seek out his advice on social matters despite their initial reluctance to do so. Even President Getúlio Vargas spoke with Tavares de Lima about social matters that culminated in the 1954 legislation governing proper work ethics.

Tavares de Lima received a picture of Pope John XXIII in 1959. Father Saverio Brugnara recounted that the priest looked at the image and said that both needed to appeal to God's intercession for both the pope and the Church itself in light of the fact that the Second Vatican Council had been convoked. One of those present in the room wanted to remove the image of Pope Pius XII to place the new one up but Tavares de Lima said to leave the image on the wall as it was for "soon I will meet him!"

The journalist Joelmir Beting once said on a radio program that at Easter in 1953 the priest celebrated Mass at 12:00 pm in the church for people but was seen at that exact time in São Pedro dos Morrinhos at an auction of cattle to help raise funds for his sanatorium. The 1955 healing of José Alexandre Braga (b. 1950) from osteochondritis was also attributed to him. Tavares de Lima shrugged the miracles off as unimportant but placed great emphasis on the conversions of spirit such healings fostered.

He led an austere life dedicated to material and spiritual poverty, following his desire to live like the poor did. He slept on a wooden board rather than a bed and ate okra soup at dinner which was his sole meal. His residence was also devoid of furniture and he had one cassock that he repaired himself on numerous occasions rather than getting new ones. He donated material things that his parishioners gave him to the poor rather than use them for himself. He also could read hearts in confession which enabled him to see the penitent better but could cause upset to some who sought him in the confessional.

In 1958 during the celebrations of Holy Week he celebrated a Mass outside the San Antonio church and made an address. But he began levitating from the ground without having realized what was happening to the great awe of the gathered crowds.

=== Death ===
Tavares de Lima died in Tambaú on 16 June 1961 due to complications of cardiac and diabetic complications that had caused several previous hospitalizations. He died in the morning at 11:15 am while seated in a chair. His remains were interred on 17 June. His remains were exhumed on 7–8 May 2009 in Tambaú for canonical inspection and relocation, which was done at night to avoid a large crowd forming. His remains were later moved to his old parish church on 16 May and now attract between 10 and 12 thousand pilgrims per month.

== Beatification ==
The beatification process opened under Pope John Paul II on 2 December 1996 after the Congregation for the Causes of Saints (C.C.S) titled Tavares de Lima as a Servant of God and declared "nihil obstat" (no objections) to the cause which had been requested since 1991. The diocesan process was overseen in collecting documentation and witness testimonies in São João de Boa Vista from 16 March 1997 until just over a decade later on 16 May 2009. On 3 June 2009 the documentation collected was transferred to the C.C.S. in Rome who later validated the process on 29 October 2010. On 21 January 2011 the Benedictine priest Alfredo Simón was appointed as the cause's relator who would help the postulator in drafting the Positio dossier. On 6 May 2013 the dossier was submitted to the C.C.S. for assessment.

Tavares de Lima became titled as Venerable on 9 October 2017 after Pope Francis confirmed that he had lived a model Christian life of heroic virtue in accordance with the cardinal and theological virtues.

On 19 March 2018 the bishop Antonio Vilar met with the C.C.S. prefect Cardinal Angelo Amato who assured the bishop that medical experts had confirmed that a healing presented for Tavares de Lima's potential beatification was a miracle and that theologians would soon assess it. Pope Francis – on 6 April 2019 – signed a decree acknowledging this miracle which therefore enabled for him to be beatified in Tambaú on 23 November 2019.

The current postulator for this cause is Dr. Paolo Vilotta.
