= Bernardo Mello Franco =

Brazilian journalist

Bernardo Mello Franco

Bernardo Mello Franco (born November 4, 1983, in Rio de Janeiro) is a Brazilian journalist specializing in politics.

== Career ==
He is graduated in journalism at the Federal University of Rio de Janeiro.

He began his career in 2004, in Jornal do Brasil, where he passed the sections "Brasil" and "Ideias". In 2005, he transferred to the newspaper O Globo. It was sent to the Brasília branch in 2007.

In 2010, he was hired by Folha de S.Paulo to act as a political reporter in São Paulo. He covered Marina Silva's campaign in the 2010 presidential election.

Between 2012 and 2013, he was Folha's correspondent in Europe, based in London. Participated in the coverage of the conclave that elected Pope Francisco and the 2013 elections in Germany, won by Chancellor Angela Merkel.

In 2014, after a season as a reporter for the Rio branch, he was acting editor of the Panel during the presidential elections. In December, he made his debut in the Brasília column, on page A2, where he wrote five times a week.

In 2017, he served as a political commentator for BandNews FM radio. In 2018, returns to the newspaper O Globo with column signed with its name.
