= Ocean FM =

Ocean FM may refer to the following radio stations:

- Ocean FM (Cayman Islands)
- Ocean FM (Ireland)
- Heart Hampshire, formerly Ocean FM (UK)
