= Rádio Trânsito =

Rádio Trânsito (ZYD889)
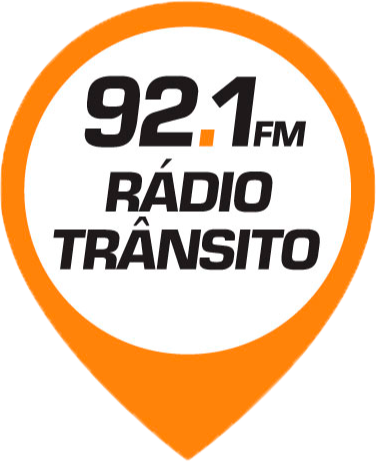

Mogi das Cruzes; Brazil
- Broadcast area: São Paulo metropolitan area
- Frequency: 92.1 MHz
- Branding: Rádio Trânsito Caçula de Pneus

Programming
- Language: Portuguese
- Format: news; work for hire; music

Ownership
- Owner: Rádio Metropolitana; (Rádio Metropolitana Paulista Ltda.)
- Operator: Grupo Bandeirantes de Comunicação

History
- First air date: 1980
- Last air date: July 31, 2020

Technical information
- Licensing authority: ANATEL
- Class: E3
- ERP: 60 kW
- Transmitter coordinates: 23°28′40″S 46°12′02″W

Links
- Public license information: Profile

Rádio Trânsito, also known as Rádio Trânsito Caçula de Pneus, was a Brazilian radio station with headquarters in São Paulo city, capital of the homonym state, specialized in providing services and information on the transit of the roads of the capital and metropolitan region to its listeners. The station has a concession in the city of Mogi das Cruzes and operates on the FM radio in the 92.1 MHz frequency for the listeners in the São Paulo metropolitan area. The concession of the station is owned by Radio Metropolitana, also of Mogi das Cruzes, controlled by the Sanzone family, also owner of Metropolitana FM.

The radio station in its current format was inaugurated on February 12, 2007, as a result of a partnership between the SulAmérica Seguros, MPM Propaganda and the Grupo Bandeirantes de Comunicação, making the radio present itself as "Rádio SulAmérica Trânsito", using the naming rights of insurance company. However, with the end of the partnership with SulAmérica on July 1, 2016, the station was renamed as "Rádio Trânsito", and continues to be operated by the Grupo Bandeirantes de Comunicação. The radio currently uses the naming right of the tire distributor Caçula de Pneus.

== History ==
The frequency of FM 92.1 MHz is a concession belonging to the Sanzone family, whose members are owners of stations such as Metropolitana FM, granted in the city of São Paulo, and Rádio Metropolitana, from Mogi das Cruzes. The FM concession of this radio was granted on August 14, 1980.

Initially, the frequency transmitted the programming of Rádio Metropolitana, then turned to 92 FM, until the change of the radio Líder FM from 104.1 MHz (frequency that now houses Top FM) to 92.1 MHz in 1995. The radio ended its activities in 1999, when the frequency was leased to the Grupo Record, which in its place launched Emoção FM, with popular programming. After the project of Emoção FM was finished, the frequency was again leased, this time to the God is Love Pentecostal Church.

With the success of Oi FM – radio network with naming rights of the mobile operator Oi – Grupo Bandeirantes de Comunicação decided to venture into the market by launching a new broadcaster with naming rights of the insurance company SulAmérica Seguros, alongside advertising company MPM Propaganda. The final result of the partnership put on the air the Rádio SulAmérica Trânsito, the first specialized traffic information station in Brazil, which had its debut on February 12, 2007.

The partnership that maintained the naming rights of SulAmérica Seguros on the radio was ceased on July 1, 2016, when the radio started to identify itself only as "Rádio Trânsito". The radio returned to naming rights in November, after closing a partnership with the Caçula de Pneus tire distributor, causing the radio station to identify itself as "Rádio Trânsito Caçula de Pneus".

It was shut down on July 31, 2020.

== Programming ==
The program of the station consists of continuous live traffic information throughout São Paulo metropolitan area with indication of alternative routes, as well as music during the overnight hours. The listeners of the station can collaborate with information on the transit through SMS, social networks and through a portal of voice over the telephone. The radio also has a partnership with the Waze map application, which provides traffic information.

=== Retrovisor ===
Since November 2015, Rádio Trânsito broadcast the Retrovisor show, presented by journalists Ronald Gimenez, Felipe Bueno and Juliana Furtado, airing on the station from Monday to Friday from 4:00 p.m. to 6:00 p.m.

In addition to the traffic information of the São Paulo metropolitan area, the program discusses a daily theme related to the affective memory of the listeners, such as music, clothing, food, games, toys, slang, among other subjects, also allowing the listener to interact through phone, email, and WhatsApp.
