= Sérgio Abranches =

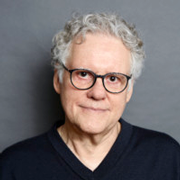
- Abranches in 2021
- Born: Sérgio Henrique Hudson de Abranches; October 11, 1949 (age 76); Curvelo, Minas Gerais, Brazil
- Education: Cornell University; University of Brasília
- Occupation: Political scientist
- Spouse: Miriam Leitão
- Website: sergioabranches.com.br

Sérgio Henrique Hudson de Abranches (born October 11, 1949) is a Brazilian political scientist, university professor, and political analyst. He graduated from the University of Brasília, where he also earned his master's degree before pursuing a Ph.D. at Cornell University in Ithaca, New York. In the late 1980s, Abranches published the article entitled Presidencialismo de Coalizão (Coalition Presidentialism), in which he developed one of the most influential theories in Brazilian political science.

== Biography ==
Born into a traditional family of lawyers from Minas Gerais, his father was president of the city council of Barbacena and connected to Bias Fortes' political group. At age ten, he moved to Brasília, where his father helped organize the new public administration. He studied at University of Brasília (UnB) after AI-5, was an activist against the military dictatorship, and was arrested a few times but faced mild repression due to his father's influence in the Order of Attorneys of Brazil in the Federal District. Influenced by Celso Lafer, he pursued a Ph.D. at Cornell University under Sidney Tarrow's supervision.

Abranches is married to journalist Miriam Leitão.

== Coalition presidentialism ==
The concept of coalition presidentialism was first introduced by Sérgio Abranches in a seminal 1988 article published in Revista Dados, even before Brazil's current Constitution was enacted. He argued that Brazil's political system is defined by a unique combination of proportional representation, a fragmented multiparty system, and a strong presidency that relies on broad, unstable coalitions. According to Abranches, this institutional arrangement forces the president to constantly negotiate with Congress, making governance highly dependent on coalition management. The process involves three key stages: forming electoral alliances, distributing government positions to secure support, and transforming these alliances into a functional governing coalition.

Abranches' theory became influential but also sparked debate, as it portrayed Brazilian presidentialism as inherently unstable and prone to crises. Critics, such as Fernando Limongi and Argelina Cheibub Figueiredo, challenged this view, arguing that congressional rules and party leadership structures actually promote discipline, especially in budget votes. They contended that Abranches overstated the system's fragility, overlooking mechanisms that help maintain governability despite the multiparty environment.

The theory remains a cornerstone of Brazilian political science, often associated with a "pessimistic" school of thought that includes scholars like Scott Mainwaring and Bolívar Lamounier. While later research has refined some of its claims, coalition presidentialism continues to shape discussions on executive-legislative relations in Brazil, highlighting both the challenges and adaptations within the country's democratic system.

== Works ==
- Abranches, Sérgio H. (2017). A Era do Imprevisto: A grande transição do século XXI. Companhia das Letras. ISBN 9788535928778.
- Abranches, Sérgio H. (2018). Presidencialismo de coalizão: Raízes e evolução do modelo político brasileiro. Companhia das Letras. ISBN 9788535931556.
- Abranches, Sérgio H. (2020). O Tempo dos Governantes Incidentais. Companhia das Letras. ISBN 9788535933611.
