= WOR Radio Network =

Slate of nationally syndicated radio programming

The WOR Radio Network was a slate of nationally syndicated radio programming produced and distributed by flagship radio station WOR in New York City. The programming was primarily general interest commercial talk; only one non-talk program had ever been carried on the network, WAER's "Big Bands, Ballads and Blues". It combined attributes of being a syndicator and a network, distributing programs like the former while selling commercials like the latter.

The network's first program was Smart Money With The Dolans, which began in January 1992. The Gene Burns Program was the second, in May 1992.

Following the sale of WOR to Clear Channel Communications in 2012, most of the remaining programming on the WOR Radio Network migrated to Radio America.

In April 2000, a second channel was added to WOR Radio Network, providing satellite feeds and creating new shows for radio stations. Addition of two websites, wormusic.com and wortalk.com, expanded the WOR brand further. The music site was aimed at people from 45 to 64 who wanted to listen via the Internet and was projected to demonstrate the format with national syndication in mind.

Programs included the Joey Reynolds Show, which dealt with "recovery, spiritual, and non-political issues".

Affiliated stations included WDRC in Hartford, Connecticut, and WSYR in Syracuse, New York.

== Schedule ==
The WOR Radio Network operated two separate feeds, WOR-1 and WOR-2. WOR-2 ceased in the late 2000s due to a lack of overlapping programming. The schedule of live feeds, as of September 2012 (all times Eastern):

=== Weekdays ===
- Noon–3 p.m.: Dr. Joy Browne

=== Saturdays ===
- Noon–2 p.m.: Dr. Ronald Hoffman
- 2–4 p.m.: The Car Doctor with Ron Ananian
- 4–6 p.m.: The Pet Show with Warren Eckstein

=== Sundays ===
- 8–10 a.m.: Easy Gardening with Mark Viette
- 10 a.m.–Noon: Food Talk with Michael Colameco
- Noon–2 p.m.: The Travel Show with Arthur Frommer

The remainder of the network feed consisted of rebroadcasts and "best of" shows.

== Former hosts ==
- The Dolans
- Bob Grant
- Dave Graveline
- Joan Hamburg
- Walter Kiernan
- Lionel
- Steve Malzberg
- Joey Reynolds
- Joan Rivers
- Jay Severin
