= SulAmérica Seguros =

Brazilian insurance company

Sul América S.A.
- Type: Sociedade Anônima
- Traded as: B3: SULA3, SULA4, SULA11
- Industry: Financial services
- Founded: December 5, 1895; 130 years ago
- Headquarters: Rio de Janeiro, Brazil
- Key people: Patrick Antonio Claude de Larragoiti Lucas (Chairman); Ricardo Bottas (CEO)
- Services: Insurance
- Revenue: ▲ R$ 21.0 billion (2021)
- Net income: ▼ R$ 332.5 million (2021)
- Total assets: ▲ R$ 48.3 billion (2021)
- Number of employees: 4,176 (2021)
- Website: sulamerica.com.br

SulAmérica is the second largest Brazilian insurance company with more than 7 million customers and a distribution network of more than 30,000 independent brokers. SulAmérica Seguros operates in several lines of insurance, such as health and dental, automobile and other basic lines, life, as well as other segments, such as private pension, investments and capitalization. The company was founded in 1895 and is controlled by Rede D'or.

== History ==
Sul América Companhia Nacional de Seguros de Vida was founded in December 1895 by entrepreneur D. Joaquim Sanchez de Larragoiti, who operated in the life insurance segment in the Brazilian market.

In 1918, the company launched Insurance for Partners, Employers and Employees, the first group life insurance service in the Brazilian market. SulAmérica magazine was launched two years later. In the 1920s, the company began to offer other services such as Automobile and Personal Accident Insurance.

In 1925, SulAmérica opened its new headquarters building, in the center of Rio de Janeiro.

In 1969, SulAmérica went public and was traded on the Rio de Janeiro Stock Exchange. A year later, in 1970, SulAmérica began its health operations through post-payment plans.

With the expansion of services in 1987, SulAmérica began private pension operations, called SulAmérica Previdência Privada.

In January 2019, SulAmérica installed vending machines selling travel insurance in the São Paulo–Guarulhos International Airport. In August 2019, SulAmérica Seguros sold its automobile insurance operations to Allianz for R$3 billion.

== Description ==
The company operates in the life insurance, health, automobiles, and other balance-sheet. The company's businesses are conducted through a broad and diversified distribution network, included more than 29,000 active brokers, employers, joint ventures and strategic alliances to sell its products with major financial institutions operating in Brazil, such as BV Financeira, HSBC, Santander and Banco Safra.
