= Steve Malzberg =

American radio personality

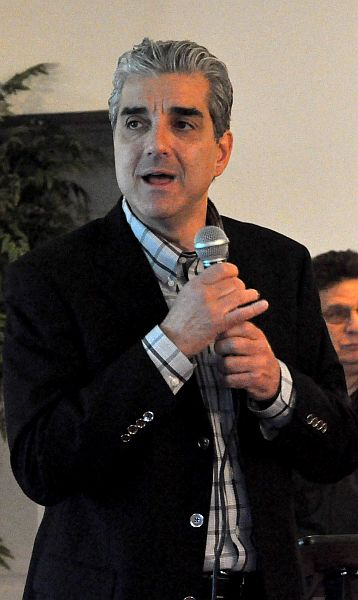
- Steve Malzberg attends Americans For Prosperity "Maxed Out Spending Tour" on March 19, 2011
- Born: April 20, 1959 (age 67)
- Education: Brooklyn College
- Occupation: Talk Show Host
- Website: Official website

Stephen D. Malzberg (/ˈmɔːlzbɜːrɡ/; born April 20, 1959) is an American television and radio host, syndicated columnist, and political commentator. He previously hosted The Steve Malzberg Show, a cable news and opinion show on Newsmax TV. He has also hosted The Steve Malzberg Show and various other radio shows on WABC Radio in NYC and on WOR Radio, also in NYC where his show was syndicated on the WOR Radio Network.

== Career ==
A graduate of Lafayette High School (1976) and Brooklyn College (1982), Malzberg worked at 77 WABC for over 25 years in several capacities, as an overnight political talk show host, a sports commentator, and co-host of a regular afternoon show with Richard Bey called The Buzz. He hosted the New York Jets pre, post and half time shows in the mid-1980s, the New York Yankees pre and post games shows in 1990 and the New Jersey Devils pre and post game shows in 1996 and 1997. In 2004, Malzberg joined the staff of New York City radio station WWRL/1600 AM, where he co-hosted an early morning show with New York Daily News columnist Karen Hunter. In July 2005, the short-lived morning team of Hunter and Malzberg was disbanded as Malzberg left WWRL.

In 2006, Malzberg returned to WABC to broadcast brief sports commentary segments. Throughout his career, he has also served as a substitute talk show host (on radio and television) and political pundit on various cable news shows, such as Heartland (hosted by Republican Governor of Ohio John Kasich), Fox & Friends, Hannity & Colmes, The O'Reilly Factor, Dayside, and several other programs on the Fox News Channel and CNN. He has been a host and commentator on cable-news channel MSNBC, and CNN. He was a frequent contributor to Phil Donahue's MSNBC show.

In May 2007, Malzberg replaced Lionel as an evening host on WOR in New York and on the nationally syndicated WOR Radio Network. The Steve Malzberg Show initially aired in the late-night time slot, but aired live on the network from 4 to 6 PM ET Monday through Friday for most of its life. On September 1, 2011, Malzberg announced on his personal web site that WOR had not renewed his contract. The slot was filled by former New York Governor David Paterson.

From February 2013 through October 2017 Malzberg was featured on Newsmax TV's The Steve Malzberg Show. His first guest on his first show for Newsmax was Donald Trump, who he went on to interview several times including 3 times during the 2016 presidential campaign. In 2020, he launched the media critique show Eat the Press on the Russian government-controlled U.S. channel RT, which ran until the channel was shut down in March 2022 in the wake of Russia's invasion of Ukraine.

== Personal life ==
Malzberg is a resident of Fair Lawn, New Jersey. He is Jewish. He is divorced and has one son.
