= BandSports =

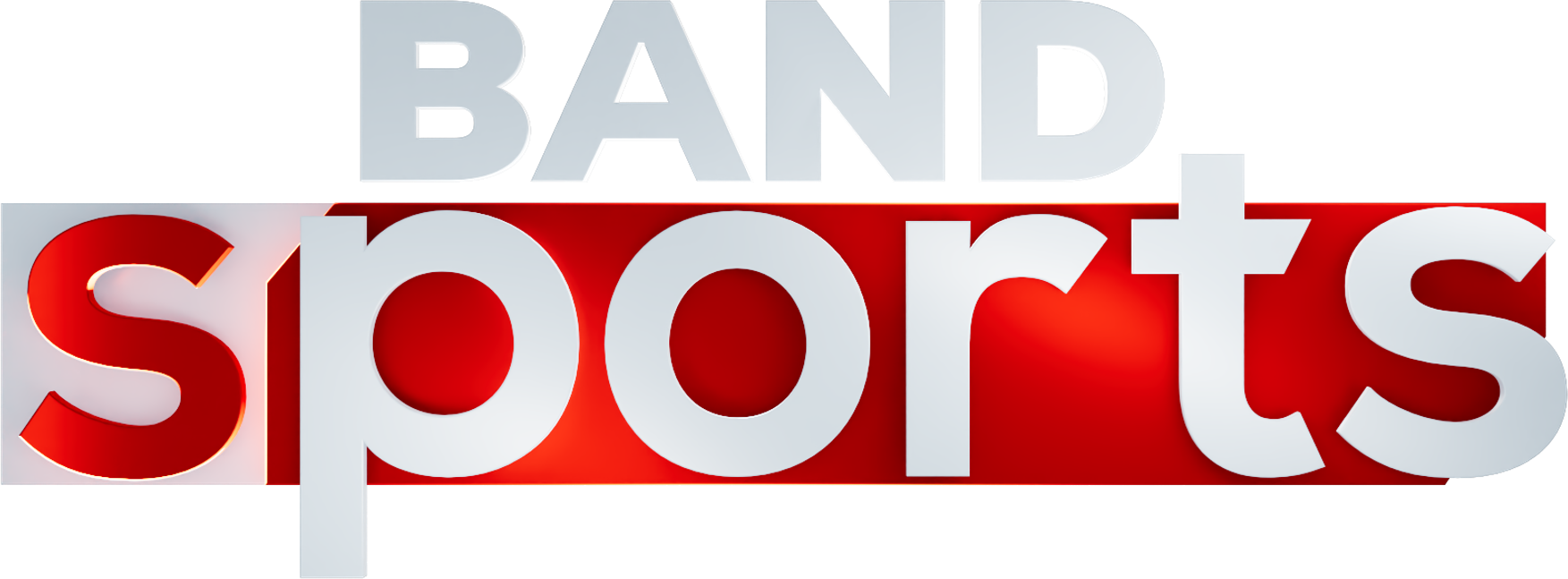
- Country: Brazil
- Broadcast area: Brazil
- Network: Rede Bandeirantes
- Headquarters: São Paulo, São Paulo

Programming
- Language: Portuguese
- Picture format: 480i (SDTV); 1080i (HDTV)

Ownership
- Owner: Grupo Bandeirantes de Comunicação
- Sister channels: Rede Bandeirantes; BandNews

History
- Launched: May 27, 2002

Links
- Website: bandsports.uol.com.br

BandSports is a Brazilian cable television network that has its programming based on all sports, launched in 2002 by Grupo Bandeirantes de Comunicação.

== Sports Programming ==
=== Football ===
- Saudi Pro League
- African Nations Championship
- African Champions League
- African Confederation Cup
- Women's Africa Cup of Nations

=== Basketball ===
- Campeonato Brasileiro de Basquete
- Campeonato Paulista de Basquete

=== Beach Tennis ===
- Circuito Brasileiro Feminino de Beach tennis

=== Combat Sports ===
- Standout Fighting Tournament*
- Prime Kickboxing
- Brazilian Wrestling Federation*
- Centurion FC

=== Futsal ===
- Campeonato Catarinense de Futsal
- Liga Nacional de Futsal
- Liga Paulista de Futsal
- Liga Feminina de Futsal do Brasil
- Copa do Brasil de Futsal
- Copa Libertadores de Futsal

=== Motorsports ===
- AMG Cup Brasil
- Copa Truck*
- FIA World Endurance Championship
- Formula 4 Brazil
- Formula E*
- Gold Classic
- Gold Turismo
- Grande Prêmio da Cidade de São Paulo 1000 Milhas
- Moto 1000 GP
- MXGP
- Porsche Cup Brasil*
- Stock Car Pro Series
- Stock Series
- TCR Brasil Touring Car Championship
- TCR South America Touring Car Championship
- Turismo 1.4
- Turismo Nacional
- World Superbike Championship
- Yamalube R3 Cup South America

=== Sailing ===
- SailGP

*(also aired on Band)

== Programs broadcast by BandSports ==
- Acelerados*
- Bola Rolando
- Debate Pronto
- Depois do Jogo
- Drops BandSports
- Encontro de Craques
- Esporte Agora
- Esporte Total*
- Fórmula Band*
- G4
- Maratona BandSports
- Na Reta dos Boxes
- Oléé S.A.
- Papo de Paddock
- Sala do Esporte
- SuperMotor
- Tempo Técnico
- Vila BandSports
- Você Torceu Aqui*

*(also aired on Band)

== See also ==
- Grupo Bandeirantes
