= Ocean FM (Cayman Islands) =

- George Town, Cayman Islands; Cayman Islands
- Broadcast area: Grand Cayman, Cayman Islands
- Frequency: 95.5 MHz
- Branding: Ocean FM

Programming
- Format: Freeform

Ownership
- Owner: Cerentis Broadcasting Systems

Technical information
- Transmitter coordinates: 19°18′N 81°23′W

Ocean FM (95.5 FM) is a defunct radio station in the Cayman Islands in the British West Indies. The station was owned by Cerentis Broadcasting Systems. It aired a classic hits music format.

The station's last license was issued on 11 December, 2003. Ocean FM went off the air in late 2006 and was put up for sale but technical and financial issues made such a sale untenable and the government revoked the license on 16 August 2007.
