= Grupo Bandeirantes de Comunicação =

Brazilian media conglomerate

Rádio e Televisão Bandeirantes S.A.
- Trade name: Grupo Bandeirantes de Comunicação
- Company type: Private
- Industry: Mass media
- Founded: 6 May 1937; 89 years ago
- Founder: João Jorge Saad
- Headquarters: R. Radiantes, 13, São Paulo, SP, Brazil
- Area served: Worldwide
- Key people: Cláudio Giordani; (executive vice-president); Paulo Saad Jafet; (vice-president of pay channels); Giselle Estefano; (vice-president of marketing)
- Products: Broadcasting; Print media; Digital media; Out-of-home advertising
- Brands: Rede Bandeirantes; Rede 21; TV Terra Viva; BandNews TV; BandSports; Band Internacional; Band FM; BandNews FM; Rádio Bandeirantes; Nativa FM
- Revenue: R$ 1,4 billion (2011)
- Number of employees: 5,400 (2011)
- Website: band.uol.com.br

Grupo Bandeirantes de Comunicação (commonly referred only as Grupo Bandeirantes or Bandeirantes) is a Brazilian media conglomerate founded on the creation of the first group communication vehicle, Rádio Bandeirantes, on 6 May 1937. The group was founded by São Paulo Brazilian-Syrian businessman João Saad. Since 1999, the conglomerate has been chaired by Johnny Saad, João Jorge's son, who assumed this role in the company after his father's death.

== Companies ==
=== Broadcasting ===
==== Free-to-air television ====
- Band TV — broadcast television network with national coverage.
- Rede 21 — broadcast television network, broadcasting the programming of its leaseholder, the Universal Church of the Kingdom of God.
- TV Terra Viva — free-to-air satellite television channel about agrobusiness. (Note: Despite being considered a subscription television channel by Bandeirantes, Terra Viva is a free-to-air television channel to maintain its clear signal on satellite and have a station that broadcasts its terrestrial signal free-to-air for about 11 hours in São Paulo. The channel's live streaming page is available to watch without extra fees or TV subscription.)

==== Subscription channels ====
- Arte 1 — channel about art and culture.
- BandNews TV — rolling news channel.
- BandSports — sports channel.
- Band Internacional — channel oriented for Brazilian public who lives outside Brazil.
- FishTV —
- Sexprivé — adult content channel, partnership with Brasileirinhas.
- Sabor & Arte — gastornomy content channel.
- New Brasil - Channel with content of channels of Newco, in addition to programs of Rede Bandeirantes.

==== Radio networks ====
- Band FM — popular music radio network.
- BandNews FM — all news radio network.
- Rádio Bandeirantes — news talk radio network.
- Nativa FM — popular music radio network, joint venture with Grupo Camargo de Comunicação.

==== Independent stations ====
- Band Vale FM — radio station from Taubaté, São Paulo, with music and news programming.
- Brasil Radio (WRSO) — radio station from Orlando, Florida, United States, which broadcasts the programming of the Grupo Bandeirantes radio networks in partnership with Cafifa Media Group.
- Educadora FM — radio station to provide programs for young people located in Campinas.
- MPB Brasil — radio station with a música popular brasileira programming at Rio de Janeiro city.
- Rádio Trânsito — radio station with traffic information from Greater São Paulo.

=== Print media ===
- Metro Brasil — free distribution newspaper, result of a joint-venture with Metro International.
- Primeiramão — classified ads newspaper.

=== Digital media ===
- Band.com.br — web portal which houses all the company's sites, hosted by UOL.
- BandPlay — streaming platform offering content and live broadcasts from Rede Bandeirantes and other channels within the group.
- Ipanema FM — rock web radio station.
- One Brasil — interactive media company.

=== Out-of-home ===
- Otima — joint-venture with Odebrecht, Kalítera Engenharia e APMR Investimentos e Participações, responsible for urban furniture of the bus stops in São Paulo city.
- Outernet — main out-of-home company of the group, which operates with several other companies.
  - Mão Dupla — out of home company that works with static media the bus lines in the city of São Paulo.
  - Modern Airport — out of home company that operates in the São Paulo–Guarulhos International Airport.
  - Nextmídia — out of home company that operates in bus terminals.
  - Orla TV — out of home company that operates in kiosks on the shores of the Rio de Janeiro beaches.
  - TVO — out of home company that operates in bus lines in the city of São Paulo.
  - TV Minuto — out of home company that operates in the lines 1-Blue, 2-Green and 3-Red of São Paulo Metro.

=== Other companies ===
- Band Content Distribution — content distribution company.
- Band Music — record company.
- Enter — events promoter company.
- payleven — online payment company. (merged with SumUp)
- TkT1 — ticket sales.
- Lawson – convenience store franchise
