= Ricardo Boechat =

Brazilian news anchor (1952–2019)

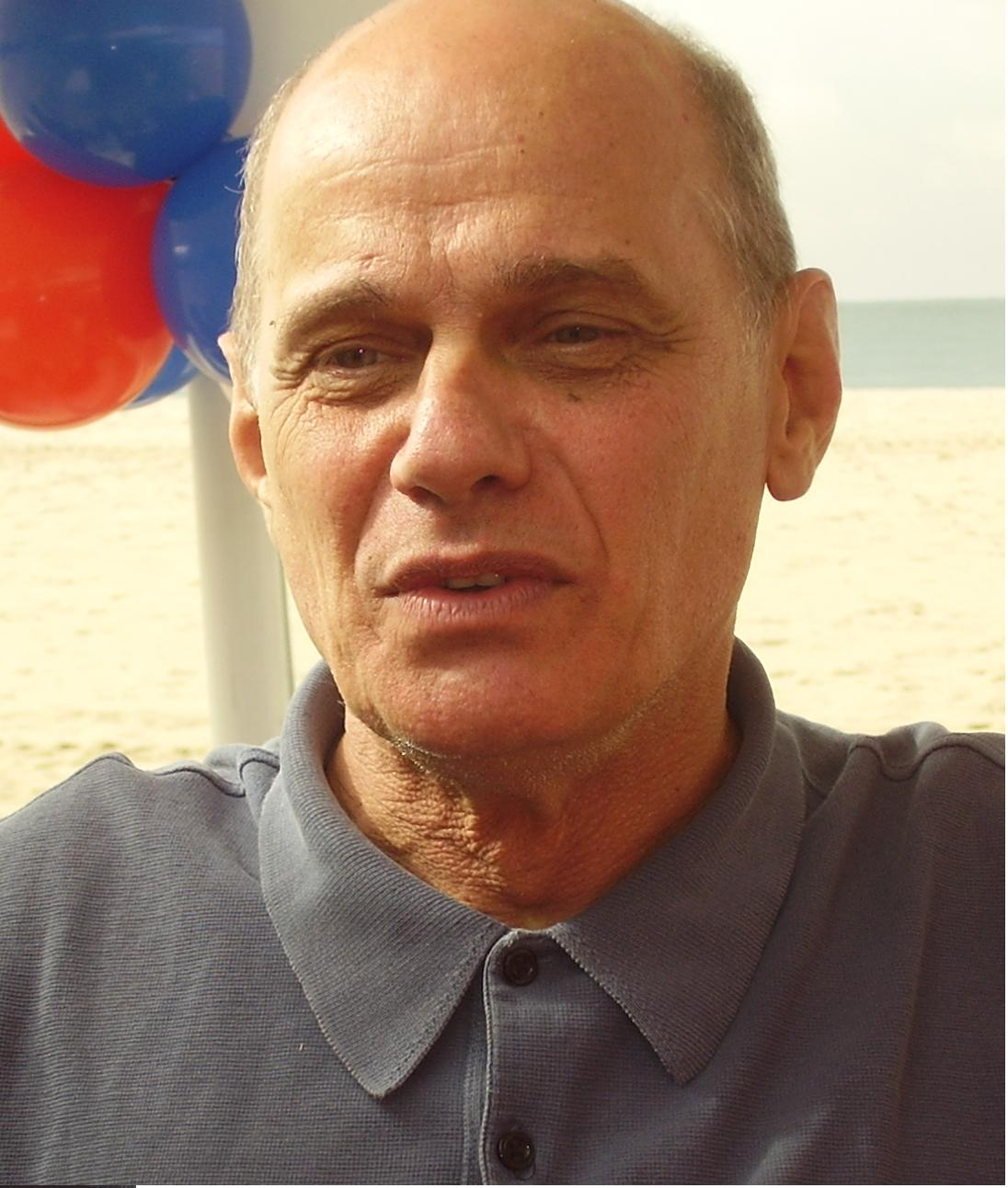
- Boechat in 2010
- Born: Ricardo Eugênio Boechat; July 13, 1952; Buenos Aires, Argentina
- Died: February 11, 2019 (aged 66); São Paulo, Brazil
- Occupation: Journalist
- Television: BandNews FM, Band TV
- Spouse: Veruska Seibel (m. 2005)
- Children: 6

Ricardo Eugênio Boechat (July 13, 1952 – February 11, 2019) was a Brazilian news anchor. He worked for newspapers such as O Globo, O Dia, O Estado de São Paulo and Jornal do Brasil. Before his death, he was active as a news director and radio anchor at BandNews FM and held a position as television anchor at Jornal da Band. Boechat won three Esso Journalism Awards. He entertained a weekly column at news magazine IstoÉ, and in 2002 authored the book Copacabana Palace.

== Career ==
Boechat began his career in 1970 as reporter at the newspapers O Estado de S. Paulo, Jornal do Brasil, and the now extinct Diário de Notícias. In 1983 went to the newspaper O Globo. In 1987 he served a six-month term as the Secretariat of Social Communication in the government of Moreira Franco (1987–1991). After fulfilling that commitment he returned to O Globo. At the same time, he began teaching at the College of the City of Rio de Janeiro, where he was involved in editing the monthly newsletter. He hosted a radio news program on BandNews FM, served as an anchor on the news program Jornal da Band, wrote a column for the newspaper O Dia in Rio de Janeiro, and a weekly column in the magazine Isto É.

Boechat voiced a jaguar newscaster in the Brazilian version of the American animated film Zootopia (Zootropolis). Other versions of Zootopia released in other countries use different newscaster characters.

== Personal life ==
Boechat was first married to Claudia Costa de Andrade and they had four children. He later married Veruska and they had two children.

== Death ==
Boechat died in a helicopter crash on February 11, 2019, near São Paulo, Brazil. Four days later, the Legal Medical Institute published that a politraumatic head injury caused the death of the journalist.
