= BandNews FM =

Brazilian all news radio network

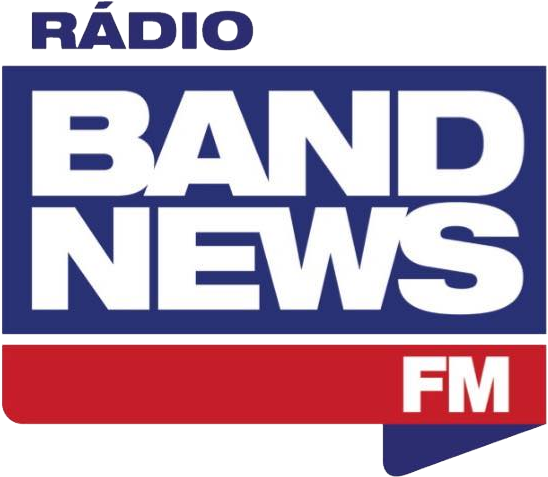
- Type: Broadcast radio network
- Country: Brazil
- First air date: May 20, 2005
- Availability: In some Brazilian states via broadcast radio and via cable/internet for the others areas
- Founded: 2005 by Grupo Bandeirantes
- Headquarters: R. Radiantes, 13, Morumbi, São Paulobe
- Owner: Grupo Bandeirantes
- Parent: Band FM, Nativa FM, Rádio Bandeirantes, Bradesco Esportes FM
- Official website: bandnewsfm.com.br

BandNews FM is a Brazilian all-news radio network owned by Grupo Bandeirantes de Comunicação. First broadcast on May 20, 2005, it is the first Brazilian radio network that provides non-stop news programming 24 hours a day, considering that CBN does intersperse news with talk shows.

The network's format consisted of 20-minute rotating newscasts with 3 of these minutes allocated for analysis and opinion from the anchors and columnists. The vast majority of its programming is produced and broadcast live from São Paulo.

== History timeline ==
- September 2004: Rádio Sucesso, which was experiencing a financial crisis due to heavy compensation for the newspaper Jornal do Brasil in Rio and the loss of leadership for its competitors, was sold to the Group Bandeirantes de Comunicação. Soon after, there were rumours that the relaunched station would play electronica and hip-hop music, or just relayed Rádio Bandeirantes, which would turn out to be wrong.
- March 20, 2005: At midnight, São Paulo, Rio de Janeiro, Belo Horizonte and Porto Alegre had got their own BandNews FM stations. These are the flagship stations of the network. The breakfast drivetime, from 7 to 9 in the weekday mornings, was hosted by Carlos Nascimento, and the rest of the programming consisted of 20-minute rolling news blocks. Marcello D'Angelo, André Luiz Costa and Nilo Frateschi Jr. participated in the creation of the network. In 2006, the morning band was taken over by Ricardo Boechat.
- August 8, 2005: The fifth BandNews FM station was launched in Salvador, in 99.1 MHz.
- January 2, 2006: The sixth BandNews FM station was launched in Curitiba, on 96.3 MHz.
- June 19, 2007: The seventh BandNews FM station was launched in Brasília, on 90.5 MHz.
- October 6, 2008: BandNews FM opened its headquarters in Campinas, São Paulo.
- March 29, 2010: BandNews FM opened its second headquarters in Ribeirão Preto, still within São Paulo.
- June 2010: BandNews FM began to be carried by the pay TV company Via Embratel (now Claro TV).
- March 27, 2011: BandNews FM had its own sports team, led by Odinei Edson, Cacá Fernando and Dirceu Maravilha.
- January 24, 2012: The television program Agora É Tarde, on January 24, 2012, would be simulcast with Rede Bandeirantes.
- December 2012: BandNews FM has a new logo that is still in use today.
- 2013: BandNews FM Belo Horizonte began broadcasting Minas Gerais sports coverage with the end of local broadcasts by Esportes FM, absorbing part of the team that worked in the sports station. On February 18, BandNews FM left the city of Campinas 106.7 to give place to Band FM. More recently, it also closed the doors in Ribeirão Preto, in the interior of São Paulo, where the frequency 96.7 was, again, replaced by Band FM.
- March 11, 2013: BandNews FM debuted in Fortaleza, Ceará, branded as Tribune BandNews FM, replacing Beach Park FM in 101.7 MHz.
- July 31 – March 9, 2014: BandNews FM events in São Paulo was broadcast by Bradesco Deportes FM, which had let its own sports staff go in the midst of a restructuring of Group Bandeirantes. In some cases, reporters and narrators of BandNews FM even made exclusive transmissions to Bradesco Deportes FM.
- January 5, 2014: Tribuna BandNews FM in Fortaleza could now follow the action in two main football clubs of Ceará with no standard transmissions.
- January 18, 2014: BandNews FM Porto Alegre began broadcasting sporting events jointly with Bandeirantes and Ipanema radio stations, mainly on Wednesdays and Sundays, and eventually on Thursdays and Saturdays.
- November 3, 2015: BandNews FM becomes available to Sky subscribers, along with three more radios from the Bandeirantes group: Band FM, Rádio Bandeirantes and Nativa FM.
- March 14, 2016: Grupo Bandeirantes inaugurated in the United States, Brasil Radio in Orlando, Florida, responsible for broadcasting the content of the journalistic network, which mixed in with some programs of the other radios of the group and local content to the American-Brazilians. The schedule of the station is totally controlled by BandNews FM in the same pattern implemented in Brazil.
- March 20, 2017: To celebrate the network's 12th anniversary, a special programme, known as Experiência BandNews FM, broadcast live across the whole network from Parque Villa-Lobos.
- March 22, 2017: A new BandNews FM website was launched, featuring radio contents in both audio and video format, as well as the ability to hear the affiliates' streams. On the same day, BandNews FM Rio de Janeiro switches from 94.9 MHz to 90.3 MHz.
- February 11, 2019. BandNewsFM director and anchor, the Journalist Ricardo Boechat, dies in a helicopter accident at Rodovia Anhanguera, São Paulo, Brazil.

== Presenters ==
- Alexandre Bentivoglio
- André Coutinho
- Arthur Covre
- Bruno Camarão
- Carla Bigatto
- Eduardo Barão
- Fábio França
- Jacqueline Dalabona (official voice of the network)
- Luís Megale
- Reinaldo Azevedo
- Ricardo Boechat (em memória)
- Sandro Badaró
- Sheila Magalhães

== See also ==
- BandNews TV
- Rádio Bandeirantes
- Eduardo Barão
