= Tambaú =

- Municipality
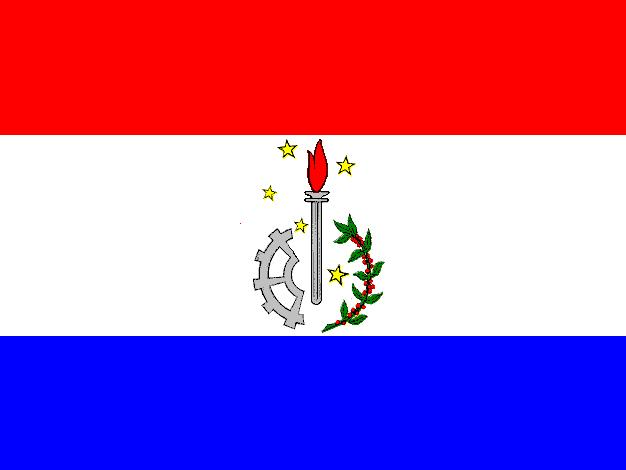
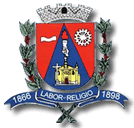
- Flag Coat of arms

- Location in São Paulo state

- Location in Brazil
- Coordinates: 21°42′18″S 47°16′28″W
- Country: Brazil
- Region: Southeast
- State: São Paulo
- Intermediary Regions of São Paulo: Intermedial Region of Campinas
- Immediate Regions of São Paulo: Immediate Region of São João da Boa Vista
- Metropolitan Region: Ribeirão Preto Metropolintan Region

Area
  - Total: 562 km^{2} (217 sq mi)

Population (2020)
  - Total: 23,232
  - Density: 41.3/km^{2} (107/sq mi)
- Time zone: UTC−3 (BRT)

Tambaú is a municipality in the state of São Paulo in Brazil. The population is 23,232 (2020 est.) in an area of 562 km^{2}. The elevation is 698 m. Tambaú was famous for the annual sermons of Padre Donizetti.

== Media ==
In telecommunications, the city was served by Telecomunicações de São Paulo. In July 1998, this company was acquired by Telefónica, which adopted the Vivo brand in 2012. The company is currently an operator of cell phones, fixed lines, internet (fiber optics/4G) and television (satellite and cable).

== Notable people ==
- Benedito Moreira de Carvalho, Brazilian serial killer

== See also ==
- List of municipalities in São Paulo
- Interior of São Paulo
