= Bandeirantes (radio network) =

Brazilian radio network

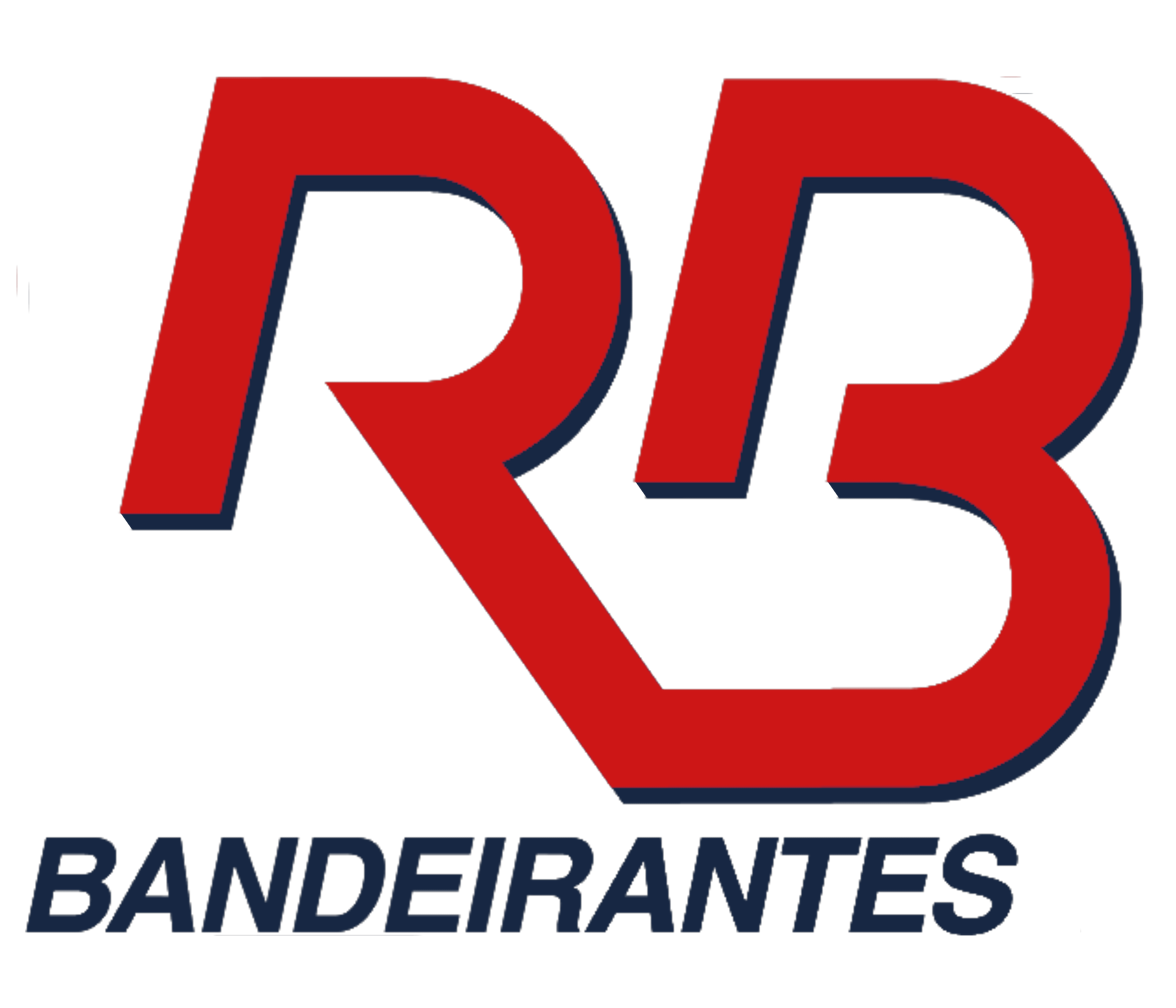
- Type: Radio broadcasting
- Genre: All-news radio
- Founded: May 6, 1937
- Headquarters: São Paulo, São Paulo, BRA
- Area served: Brazil
- Owner: Grupo Bandeirantes de Comunicação
- Parent: Band; Band FM; BandNews FM; Bradesco Esportes FM (São Paulo, Rio de Janeiro); Esportes FM (Belo Horizonte, Porto Alegre)
- Website: www.band.com.br/radio-bandeirantes

Bandeirantes is a Brazilian radio network focused on news, sports, and entertainment, based in São Paulo, property of Grupo Bandeirantes de Comunicação. It began broadcasting on May 6, 1937, initially featuring musical and cultural programming, later expanding into journalism and sports coverage.

Since May 15, 2026, Bandeirantes has been operating on the 107.3 MHz (FM) frequency in São Paulo.

== History ==
The station, initially called Sociedade Bandeirante de Radiodifusão, was inaugurated on May 6, 1937 by José Pires Oliveira Dias on Rua São Bento, in the center of São Paulo, where its first studios and auditorium were located.

In 1944, it was bought by Paulo Machado de Carvalho, who three years later sold it to Adhemar de Barros. The following year, the station was owned by Adhemar's son-in-law, João Jorge Saad.

On September 25, 1990, Rádio Bandeirantes began satellite transmissions, becoming the first FM radio station in Brazil to broadcast via satellite.

On November 3, 2015, Rádio Bandeirantes became available to subscribers of the Brazilian satellite television operator Sky Brasil, along with three other Grupo Bandeirantes radio stations: BandNews FM, Band FM, and Nativa FM.

On May 6, 2026, the network's 89th anniversary, it unveiled a new multimedia studio and a renewed visual identity. As part of the rebranding, the station dropped the word "Rádio" from its name, now referring to itself simply as Bandeirantes, to reflect its multiplatform positioning across audio, video, streaming, and digital media. The "RB" acronym in the logo was reinterpreted to stand for "Rede Bandeirantes" (Bandeirantes Network). On June 30, 2026, at 23:59 BRT, Bandeirantes ceased operations on the 90.9 MHz frequency in São Paulo, ending a 27-year lease agreement with Vip FM (concessionaire Vip Radio e Televisao Ltda.). The frequency was subsequently taken over by MyNews Vip FM on July 1, 2026. Bandeirantes' São Paulo operations are now consolidated exclusively on 107.3 MHz, its permanent frequency since May 15, 2026.
