= BandNews TV =

Brazilian news subscription television channel

- Country: Brazil
- Broadcast area: Brazil; Japan; Portugal; Angola; Lebanon
- Network: Rede Bandeirantes
- Headquarters: São Paulo (SP)

Programming
- Language: Portuguese
- Picture format: 1080i (HDTV); 480i (SDTV)

Ownership
- Owner: Grupo Bandeirantes de Comunicação

History
- Launched: 19 March 2001

Links
- Website: bandnewstv.uol.com.br

Availability

Streaming media
- Sling TV: Internet Protocol television

BandNews TV is a Brazilian 24-hour television news channel, owned by Grupo Bandeirantes. It was the second news channel launched in the Brazilian cable/satellite market.

The history of BandNews dated back to 19 March 2001, when it was launched by Grupo Bandeirantes. The first ever newscast aired at 11am that day. BandNews TV's programming was formatted around the idea (like 1982-2005 CNN Headline News) that a viewer could tune in at any time of day or night (instead of having to wait for the morning or evening news programs/round-ups on Record News and GloboNews channels), and receive up-to-date information on the top Brazilian and international stories in just 15 minutes. The initial investments from BAND for the channel were infrastructures, technical staffs and journalists, which cost them $6 million. Right at the launch, it reached 1 million viewers across Brazil on DIRECTV, NEOTV and independent pay-TV providers.

The channel also broadcasts Jornal da Band weeknights at 8:30 pm, one hour after the original broadcast on Band. Besides the news bulletins, BandNews TV airs talk shows about business and culture and short documentaries during the commercial break. BandNews is the third most watched Brazilian news channel around the country after GloboNews and Record News and it was the first Brazilian HD news network.

In 2016, the channel was added to SlingTV and became the only 24-hour Portuguese-speaking news provider in South America.

BandNews is popular by its credibility, dynamism and fast-paced coverage of news. This led to the launched of the radio station, BandNews FM, which kicked off at midnight, 20 May 2005. The initial idea of the TV channel is also used on the radio station, with a slightly longer news wheel (20 minutes, including opinions from anchors and columnists.)

== History of on-screen contents ==
From the channel's launch to 2006, its logo was: "BAND" in blue and "NEWS" in white italic. They were both bold and stick together. On the air, BandNews TV ran two-line ticker (not accounted for all the lower part of the screen), showed on-screen headline right now (upper line) and news + weather (lower line). To make the time not confused, the channel showed Brazil logo just before the current time and right after the current day.

From 2006 to 2011, the logo was now on the box, which was generally all italic. "BAND" was now on the upper half (white background) and "NEWS" was now on the lower half (blue background). The news ticker was improved to three-line and accounted for all the lower part of the screen, includes: relevant headlines to what's shown on screen (upper line), top stories (middle line) and main news from culture, world, sports, business (lower line). The channel also featured a small two-line ticker just above this three-line running one, showing Brazilian dollar (upper) and stock markets from Brazil, Europe, and Asia (lower). Under the logo, there was still the time and the day, but they weren't put at the same space anymore. As the channel started to use the slogan A notícia em primeiro lugar, this was the sign-in and sign-off tagline in every newscast.

From 2011 to 2016, nothing change in logo, except the new 3D format. BandNews TV still kept its three-line ticker format, but with 3 changes:

- The upper part was now in oval (formerly rectangle).
- Stock market was on the lower-third ticker, and it now only showed Bovespa (left) and Brazilian dollar (right). This ticker also became unnecessary for news, because the logo, time and day now were also put here.
- All the words in the middle part of the ticker now were written in bold. They were also smaller.

Now, as it unveiled new logo (stop on the 3D format), it had a new ticker. It was not accounted all the lower part of the screen anymore, and the ticker now move to two-line, similar content to the 2001-2006 ticker (the upper line was bigger than the lower line). It also stopped providing on-ticker stock markets. The time (dark background) and the day (blue background) are put on a small box at the upper left on the screen.

In May 2019, the channel received the latest on-screen packaging, which could be compared to that of SIC Notícias in Portugal.

On July 23, 2026, to mark its 25th anniversary, BandNews TV inaugurated a new studio facility at the Grupo Bandeirantes headquarters in Morumbi, São Paulo, and implemented a restructured programming schedule. According to general director Marco Antonio Sabino, the strategic overhaul shifted the network's focus from real-time breaking news towards in-depth political and economic analysis and contextual reporting, particularly given the concurrent election year. As part of its multiplatform expansion, the channel also underscored its international correspondent partnerships in Paris, London, and New York.

== Programming ==
Newscasts
Title	Main Hosts
No Meio do Dia	Eduardo Oinegue
Expresso BandNews	Andressa Guaraná and João Viera
Jornal Gente (with Radio Bandeirantes)	Pedro Campos and Thays Freitas
Fim de Semana BandNews	variety
Resumo BandNews	Nelson Gomes
Jornal BandNews
BandNews Hoje	Thalyta Almeida and Leonardo Stoliar
Edição da Noite	Felipe Viera and Veruska Donato
Madrugada BandNews	Gustavo Carvalho and Thaís Dias
Manhã BandNews	Patrícia Rocha
O É da Coisa (with Radio BandNews FM)	Reinaldo Azevedo
Panorama	Thaís Dias and Veruska Donato
Tarde BandNews	Paula Valdez and Vitor Brown
Papo Reto	Carlos Andreazza and Patrícia Rocha
O X da Questão	Rodolfo Schineider and Cynthia Martins
News features
Title	Main Hosts
Aqui Tem Vaga	Lenny Leone
BandNews Docs	variety
Capital & Mercado	Marco Antônio Sabino
Capital Natural	variety
Economia pra Você	Juliana Rosa
Partiu, BandNews!	André Coutinho
Ponto a Ponto	Mônica Bergamo; Pierpaolo Bottini
Viver Melhor	Jean Gorinchteyn
Talk shows
Title	Main Hosts
Giro Business	Sérgio Waib

=== Repeats of Rede Bandeirantes's shows ===
- Jornal da Band
- Jornal da Noite
- Jornal Terra Viva
- Canal Livre

== Slogans ==
- 2001-2006: Muito mais notícia. (Much more news.)
- 2006-2014: A notícia em primeiro lugar. (The news first.)
- 2014-2020: A notícia não para, não. (The news does not stop, no.)
- Since 2020: Muito além da notícia, Nada além da verdade. (Far beyond the news, Nothing beyond the truth.)
