= Ideal TV =

Brazilian television channel

- Type: Broadcast television network Former pay television channel
- Country: Brazil
- First air date: 1 October 2007
- Availability: Nationwide, via free-to-air television and direct-to-home services.
- Founded: 1 October 2007 by Grupo Abril
- Headquarters: Av. Prof. Alfonso Bovero, 52 - Sumaré, São Paulo
- Owner: José Roberto Garcia; Paulo Sérgio Garcia
- Parent: ID TV S.A. (Legal name of the television network)
- Key people: Plínio Shiguematsu (Chairman)
- Launch date: 1 October 2007 (as a pay TV channel); 1 October 2013 (relaunch, replacing MTV Brasil); 28 November 2021 (relaunch, replacing Loading)
- Dissolved: June 30, 2009 (first iteration); August 6, 2025 (gradual closure); August 16, 2025 (official closure)
- Former names: MTV Brasil, Ideal TV, Loading
- Claro TV: Channel 11
- Vivo TV: Channel 227 (DTH); Channel 19/27 (cable)
- Oi TV: Channel 20/31
- Sky Brasil: Channel 174/370
- Group: Abril Radiodifusão (Grupo Abril; 2007-2009; 2013-2015); Spring Comunicação (2013-2017)
- Official website: idealtv.com.br
- Replaced: MTV Brasil (2013 relaunch); Loading (2021 relaunch)
- Replaced by: Loading (except on analog satellite television); Xsports

Ideal TV (also known as Canal 32, TV Ideal, or simply IDTV) was a Brazilian television broadcaster based in São Paulo, the capital of the homonymous state. It operated on channel 32 (31 UHF digital) and belongs to Loading Entertainment Media, a startup of the Kalunga group, which also includes Loading. The channel's programming was terminated on August 6, 2025, and on August 16, 2025, the channel was discontinued, making way for Xsports.

== History ==
=== Launch on pay TV and closing ===
Ideal TV was launched on 1 October 2007 as a subscription‑television channel distributed by TVA and Telefónica to approximately 600 000 households. Its initial schedule was organised into three strands—business management, career management and good living—aimed at executives, entrepreneurs and liberal professionals aged 25 to 45 seeking to reconcile professional performance with quality of life; throughout the day, news bulletins provided updates on economic and market developments. Subsequently, the schedule adopted more defined daily themes—Career, Inspiration, Do Better, Off Work and Happy Hour—allowing greater focus on specific areas of interest. Among the flagship reality series were SOS Carreira, which followed professionals in crisis in the workplace; Pense Grande, which brought together small entrepreneurs and major business figures; and Ideal Outdoor, which premiered on 30 April and saw ten participants face challenges in a natural environment. In the fiction segment, the sitcom 100 Maneiras satirised the misadventures of an entrepreneur lacking management and etiquette skills. In the digital arena, the three most‑watched programmes were Chefe na Cozinha, hosted by Márcio Mussarela, in which an executive prepares a favourite dish while discussing management; Pergunte ao Headhunter, hosted by Carlos Mello, which addressed career queries; and Fique Rico, presented by Anne Dias, focusing on personal finance . According to André Mantovani, then director‑general of Canais Abril, 2009 cemented the channel’s relevance by supporting its audience during the global economic crisis through a combination of information and entertainment, distinguishing itself by showcasing examples of Brazilian companies and professionals with which viewers could identify and draw inspiration . On June 30, 2009, Ideal TV ceased operations as a pay-TV channel. Launched by Grupo Abril, the channel focused on corporate and business content. The decision to close was driven by challenges in the distribution of pay-TV channels in Brazil and a competitive landscape that included ManagemenTV, which launched shortly before Ideal TV. The closure surprised some executives within Grupo Abril. Attempts to bundle Ideal TV with MTV Brasil in distribution negotiations were unsuccessful, and limited interest from independent operators confined its reach primarily to TVA and Telefónica. The channel's shutdown also included the closure of another channel, FIZ TV.

=== Re-launch on over-the-air TV and Sale to Spring Group and Kalunga Group ===
On 1 October 2013, Ideal TV resumed broadcasting, replacing MTV Brasil. The Abril Group relaunched the channel to retain ownership of its broadcast license while negotiations were ongoing. Its programming consisted entirely of national productions from its previous iteration as a closed-channel (2007), repeating its archived content, alongside segments produced by Elemídia. The latter included news updates aired during commercial breaks, which were also distributed in elevators of commercial buildings, supermarkets, universities, hotels, gyms, and shopping centers. However, the available content was only sufficient to fill three to four months of programming, with remaining material requiring contract renegotiations and updated permissions for rebroadcast, a process delayed by bureaucratic hurdles. On 18 December 2013, Grupo Abril sold the UHF channel 32, Ideal TV, to Spring Televisão S.A., the media division of Grupo Spring, owned by businessman José Roberto Maluf. According to the website Notícias da TV, the transaction was valued at approximately R$200 million. Grupo Spring intended to reposition Ideal TV as a channel modeled after E!, focusing on cinema, music, entertainment, and celebrity culture.

On February 3, 2014, Ideal TV began broadcasting nationally via the Star One C2 satellite, replacing BRZ. In June 2014, Grupo Kalunga, owned by brothers José Roberto Garcia and Paulo Sérgio Garcia-proprietors of the Kalunga stationery retail chain specializing in office and school supplies-became shareholders in Ideal TV through Spring Televisão S.A. At that time, José Roberto Maluf, the majority shareholder, remained as president of the channel. In July 2014, Ideal TV, a channel owned by the Spring and Kalunga groups, entered into an agreement to lease its full programming schedule to TV Mundial, a broadcaster owned by the World Church of the Power of God, a religious organization led by Apostle Valdemiro Santiago. The arrangement was first reported on July 13 by columnist Flávio Ricco for UOL, who noted that the church—which previously held limited airtime on the channel—would expand to occupy Ideal TV’s entire broadcast schedule. Three days later, the Folha de S.Paulo column "Outro Canal" highlighted that the channel’s owners, the Spring and Kalunga groups, had not publicly addressed the reported lease or future plans for Ideal TV.

On 21 March 2017, Ideal TV ceased retransmitting programming from TV Mundial, operated by its namesake church led by Valdemiro Santiago, and began broadcasting content from TV Universal, a network owned by the Universal Church of the Kingdom of God. On 12 December 2017, José Roberto Menezes Garcia and Paulo Sérgio Menezes Garcia acquired 50% of the shares each in Ideal TV (ID TV S.A., previously known as Spring Televisão S.A.), including its physical infrastructure, through Kalunga. The Garcia brothers had held a stake in the company since June 2014. The 2017 transaction involved the acquisition of the remaining shares, which had previously been under the control of José Roberto Maluf of Spring Comunicação.

In December 2020, Grupo Kalunga announced the launch of a new youth-oriented television channel, Loading, which would replace Ideal TV. The channel began broadcasting on December 7, 2020, via terrestrial and subscription television networks. During this period, Ideal TV remained accessible through analog satellite transmission. On November 28, 2021, Ideal TV resumed operations on free-to-air and cable television, replacing Loading on channel 32 in São Paulo, as the latter officially ceased broadcasting that day. Following its relaunch, Ideal TV allocated 22 hours of its daily programming to TV Mundial, a broadcaster associated with the World Church of God's Power. On February 14, 2023, Ideal TV ceased broadcasting programming from TV Mundial, a channel operated by the Igreja Mundial do Poder de Deus, and replaced it with continuous airings of the news program De Olho no Mundo. The show, which had previously aired only during overnight hours to meet journalism quotas, featured current and archival reports from Agence France-Presse (AFP). Later the same day, without prior notice, Ideal TV reinstated TV Mundial's programming after it had been discontinued the previous day due to a contractual dispute.

On 23 January 2024, Brazil's Ministry of Communications authorized Ideal TV to operate a new television channel in Rio Branco, the capital of Acre. The authorization, published in the Official Gazette of the Union, allows ID TV S.A.—a São Paulo-based company that owns Ideal TV—to begin digital broadcasting on channel 40 under the Ideal TV brand. On 16 October 2024, Ideal TV's analog signal on the 1140H frequency of the Star One D2 satellite was discontinued, marking the end of analog satellite transmissions for the broadcaster.

On August 6, 2025, Channel 32, the defunct MTV Brasil, ceased operations as Ideal TV and the broadcast of the Worldwide Church of God’s Power. From that date, a looping identification for X-Sports went on air, announcing the channel's new programming, with the official launch scheduled for August 16, 2025. At that time, the programming included 22 hours of church content. The launch campaign was promoted through digital media and out-of-home (OOH) advertising in the capitals of São Paulo and Rio de Janeiro.
