= Rede 21 =

Brazilian commercial free-to-air television network

- Type: free-to-air television network
- Country: Brazil
- First air date: October 21, 1996
- Headquarters: Rua Radiantes, 13, 3º andar, Jardim Guedala, São Paulo, Brazil
- Owner: Grupo Bandeirantes de Comunicação
- Parent: Rede 21 Comunicações S.A.
- Key people: Johnny Saad (Chairman)
- Launch date: October 21, 1996
- Former names: Canal 21 (1996–2003)
- Digital channels: List: 17 UHF (Goiânia); 22 UHF (São Paulo); 47 UHF (Salvador)
- Picture format: 480i (SDTV); 1080i (HDTV)
- Claro TV: Channel 24
- Vivo TV: Channel 21
- Affiliations: PlayTV (2006–2008); Rede Mundial (2008–2013); TV Universal (2013–2022; 2024–present)
- Official website: www.canal21.com.br

Rede 21 (also known as Canal 21) is a Brazilian commercial broadcast television network headquartered in São Paulo. It is owned by Grupo Bandeirantes de Comunicação. Its national free-to-air signal is distributed via satellite television through the Ku-band (TVRO) system, where it is identified as channel 21. Since May 1, 2024, the network has retransmitted programming from TV Universal, operated by the Universal Church of the Kingdom of God.

== History ==
=== Early years (1996–2003) ===
With a UHF signal concession obtained by Grupo Bandeirantes de Comunicação in 1989; Rede 21 went on air on October 21, 1996, initially broadcasting only to Greater São Paulo, it was called Canal 21 São Paulo or simply Canal 21, having specialized programming only for the São Paulo capital and operated from 12 pm to 12 am. The artistic project and programming schedule of the channel were created by journalists and TV producers, Rogério Brandão and Alberto Luchetti for the Saad family, owners of the channel concession. The initial concept of the channel was that of an urban television, with live news, radio-style language, service provision and entertainment. The channel's visual identity was designed to be modern and bold, differentiating itself from what was done on other televisions at the time.

The first image to air was of a firefighter climbing the television station’s own tower, on Avenida Doutor Arnaldo, while he narrated the route through a micro headphone. In his hand, he carried a banner with the oval symbol of Canal 21 in red and white. Upon reaching the top, the banner was opened, fluttering in the wind; much of the footage was filmed by the helicopter carrying a camera. This idea was meant to honor all the anonymous heroes of the city of São Paulo, represented by the Fire Department soldier, an exemplary and supportive organization. The initial programming lineup of Channel 21 consisted of local attractions aimed at the city of São Paulo. Jornal Meio Dia, a news program hosted by José Melo Marques with reports produced by professionals from Rádio Bandeirantes AM, aired Monday through Saturday at 12 p.m., featuring content focused on news from the capital of São Paulo. Following that, at 1 p.m., Jogo Aberto was broadcast, a sports program covering the city’s football clubs, also airing Monday through Saturday. The Sessão Livre slot, dedicated to screening feature films aimed at teenage audiences, was shown next at 2 p.m. Top Teen, a live music video program with audience participation by telephone voting, occupied the 4 p.m. timeslot from Monday to Friday. At 6 p.m., Jornal São Paulo aired, a news program hosted by Marco Antonio Sabino featuring traffic updates and end-of-day news coverage; the weather forecast was presented live using footage from a camera installed on the station’s tower on Avenida Paulista, Monday through Saturday. The Cult Series slot, dedicated to series such as Family Ties, Mad About You, and Laurel and Hardy, aired Monday through Friday at 7 p.m. Finally, Jornal das Dez, a thirty-minute news program hosted by Eduardo Castro, provided a summary of the day’s main events and was broadcast Monday through Friday at 10 p.m. There were other programs in the lineup, such as Trânsito Livre, from 6 a.m. to 8 a.m., with Roberto Scaringella and Fernanda Ortiz, as well as Circular, hosted by Maria Cristina Poli, in which the interviews were conducted inside a bus, and the movie and series sessions that filled the channel’s schedule.

=== Expansion as a national network ===
On July 20, 2000, Canal 21, a station belonging to the Grupo Bandeirantes launched in 1996 as a local station in São Paulo, announced the signing of an affiliation agreement with TV Super (channel 23), from Belo Horizonte. The partnership marked the beginning of Canal 21’s transformation into a national network, called Rede 21. According to Canal 21 director Juca Silveira, the station was, at the time, negotiating affiliations with local stations in Goiânia, Brasília, Curitiba, and Salvador. TV Super began retransmitting Jornal Dez, Canal 21’s main news program. The project envisioned that future affiliates would maintain strong local journalism production, including regional newscasts and traffic and weather bulletins, while sharing national content such as Jornal Dez, as well as events, films, and TV series.

On June 1, 2003, Canal 21 began a new phase of expansion of its programming to other major Brazilian markets, starting with the affiliation of TV Brasília (channel 6) in the Federal District. The affiliation marked the beginning of the formation of Rede 21 as a television network in Brazil. On August 19, 2003, Rede 21 announced the debut of a new national programming lineup, scheduled to premiere on August 21, 2003. The reformulation accompanied the expansion of the network's coverage and the incorporation of TV Brasília into its national operations. According to the broadcaster, the new lineup aimed to bring to Brazilian free-to-air television programming formats previously associated with subscription television. The reformulated lineup included American television series such as Will & Grace and Seinfeld, both aired with original audio and Portuguese subtitles, as well as cult series already associated with the channel, including I Dream of Jeannie, Bewitched, The Nanny, and Hart to Hart. The British comedy series Absolutely Fabulous was also added to the Sunday schedule. Rede 21 also inaugurated a new newsroom-studio for the production of Jornal 10, broadcast daily from 10:00 p.m. to 10:30 p.m. The newscast was anchored by Fábio Pannunzio and Ana Luisa Médici, with Pannunzio additionally serving as editor-in-chief. According to the network, the program focused on news analysis, investigative reporting, and exclusive reports produced by teams based in Brasília, Rio de Janeiro, and São Paulo. Humberto Candil served as journalism director. The network's programming additionally included subtitled films divided into daily thematic blocks dedicated to genres such as cult films, classics, romance, comedy, and Brazilian cinema. Among the titles announced by the broadcaster were The Piano, The Flower of My Secret, Playing by Heart, Ace in the Hole, Desperado, and How Angels Are Born. The children's programming block aired daily from 5:00 p.m. to 6:30 p.m. and featured animated series including Bucky O'Hare and the Toad Wars!, The Wizard, and Tenchi Muyo!. Beginning on August 24, 2003, Rede 21 also started airing weekly musical specials on Sunday nights, initially featuring concerts recorded in the United Kingdom during the celebrations of Queen Elizabeth II's Golden Jubilee at Buckingham Palace. Additional programs announced by the network included the documentary series Os Caminhos da Fortuna, which premiered on August 24, 2003, and featured reports about wealthy public figures and celebrity lifestyles. Existing programs such as Larry King Live, Rota 21, and Tá na Moda remained on the schedule and were reassigned to weekend time slots.

=== 2006–2008: PlayTV Phase ===
On June 5, 2006, Rede 21 established a partnership with the production company Gamecorp S.A., owned by Fábio Luís Lula da Silva, son of then-President Luiz Inácio Lula da Silva. Between 5:00 p.m. and 10:00 p.m., Rede 21’s programming schedule became occupied by PlayTV’s content, a channel owned by Gamecorp. The time slot included shows about video games, anime, and music videos. Some programs previously aired by Rede 21, such as Jornal 10 and Saca-Rolha, remained on the schedule, with daily reruns during the early morning hours. During the remaining airtime, the station broadcast infomercials. With the change, Rede 21’s schedule came to consist predominantly of content aimed at young audiences, with an emphasis on gaming and entertainment.

On July 6, 2008, Rede 21's contract with PlayTV expired and was not renewed. The following day (July 7), the station began airing its own programming in that time slot. According to the "Outro Canal" column (Folha de S. Paulo), the arrangement ended because PlayTV did not increase Rede 21's audience or revenues.

=== Temporary return of Network 21 and lease to the World Church of the Power of God ===
From July 7, 2008 to August 9, 2008, Rede 21 broadcast its own programming focused on a young audience, consisting of programs such as TV Teen, Music Machine, Fanpix, and Supernovas, among others, in addition to infomercials.

On August 1, 2008, Grupo Bandeirantes, owner of Rede 21, and World Church of God's Power, led by Valdemiro Santiago, entered into a partnership to lease 22 hours daily of the station's programming, intended for the retransmission of the Rede Mundial channel.

From August 10, 2008, Rede 21's programming was replaced by that of Rede Mundial, with the exception of the news program Jornal 10, which remained on air at 10 PM.

=== 2013 – Rede Mundial's Departure ===
On November 8, 2013, Grupo Bandeirantes terminated its lease agreement with Rede Mundial, the channel of the World Church of the Power of God, led by Valdemiro Santiago, which occupied approximately 22 hours of daily programming on channel 21. The religious leader paid approximately R$7 million monthly for the airtime. The termination occurred due to late payment installments. On the same day, channel 21 removed the church's programs from the air and temporarily replaced them with game shows. In the early hours of November 9, the space came to be occupied by the Universal Church of the Kingdom of God, led by Edir Macedo, which took over the channel's programming.

=== 2022 – Interruption of the retransmission of TV Universal ===
On December 10, 2022, Rede 21 stopped retransmitting the programming of TV Universal, a broadcaster owned by the Universal Church of the Kingdom of God. According to the church, the interruption occurred due to Rede 21's failure to comply with contractual obligations. TV Universal occupied 22 hours per day of Rede 21's schedule. From that day onward, Grupo Bandeirantes began airing its own content on the channel, using material from BandNews TV and Canal Empreender, broadcasters also owned by the group.

=== 2024 – Return of TV Universal programming ===
On May 1, 2024, Rede 21 resumed retransmitting TV Universal's programming after Band renewed a partnership with the Universal Church of the Kingdom of God. Following a period of legal disputes and mutual accusations, the two parties reached a new agreement, allowing Canal 21 to once again dedicate 22 hours of its daily programming to content from the Universal Church.

In November 2026, reports from the NaTelinha portal indicated that the Universal Church of the Kingdom of God notified Rede 21 and Rede CNT of its intention not to renew their airtime lease agreements, as part of a financial restructuring and a strategic shift toward digital platforms like YouTube. While the church had initially set November 20 to end its late-night programming slot on Rede Bandeirantes (the main network), subsequent reports revealed that the broadcaster entered last-minute negotiations to extend the contract and retain the religious institution on its schedule.

== Programming ==
Between 1996 and 2006, Canal 21's programming consisted of in-house productions, American television series, and independently produced programs. The channel's news programming included Jornal Meio Dia, which focused on local news, and Jornal São Paulo, which provided traffic and weather information. Its sports lineup included live programs and discussion shows, such as Jogo Aberto. The schedule also featured international television series and programs, including Top of the Pops, Seinfeld, That '70s Show, Sex and the City, and Will & Grace. The program Top Teen was also part of the schedule, airing music videos and featuring audience voting by telephone.

In 2006, Grupo Bandeirantes leased part of the channel's broadcast schedule to Gamecorp, which launched PlayTV, a channel focused on youth-oriented programming, video games, and popular culture.

From 2008 to 2014, with its programming leased to churches, its only in-house production was Doc 21, a news bulletin that compiled articles and special reports broadcast on the Grupo Bandeirantes television channels. In 2016, the news program returned to the air, along with a rebroadcast of Jornal Terraviva from the Terraviva channel.

On August 30, 2023, Rede 21 announced the premiere of what would become its new sports-oriented programming, including shows such as Descarga Elétrica, Mulher na Área, Nitro, Show de Bola, Arena UFC, 21 Minutos, 21 News, and Online 21. In addition, the schedule would include reruns of sports programs from Rede Bandeirantes, Rádio Bandeirantes, and BandNews FM.

However, in October 2023, Grupo Bandeirantes decided not to proceed with the project. As a result, the planned programming was never launched.

== See also ==
- Rede Bandeirantes
- BandSports
- BandNews TV
