= Xsports =

Brazilian television network

- Type: Broadcast television network
- Country: Brazil
- Headquarters: Sumaré, São Paulo

Programming
- Language: Portuguese
- Picture format: HDTV 1080i

Ownership
- Owner: Grupo Kalunga
- Parent: ID TV S.A.
- Key people: Plínio Shiguematsu (Chairman)

History
- Launched: August 16, 2025
- Replaced: Ideal TV

Links
- Website: www.xsports.com.br

Availability

Terrestrial
- Digital terrestrial television: 32 UHF (Palmas and São Paulo)

Xsports is a Brazilian television network based in São Paulo, the capital of the homonymous state. It operates on channel 32 (31 UHF digital) and is owned by Grupo Kalunga, which also includes Loading. The channel was officially launched on August 16, 2025, following a pre-launch on August 6, 2025. Xsports is the first Brazilian over-the-air TV network with a 100% sports programming lineup.

The Xsports' schedule is composed mainly of broadcasts of soccer tournaments, as part of the major European championships, sublicensed through ESPN Brazil. In addition, it includes coverage of basketball, volleyball, and motorsports competitions. Other time slots are filled by sports programs acquired from producers outside Brazil. On its team, notable commentators include play-by-play announcers Milton Leite and Álvaro José, as well as commentator Mauro Beting.

== History ==
=== Background ===
Following the closure of MTV Brasil on September 30, 2013—due to the return of the brand to Viacom (now Paramount Global)—Abril Radiodifusão relaunched Ideal TV at around midnight on October 1. Originally a subscription channel from 2007 to 2009 focused on entrepreneurship, Ideal TV began broadcasting reruns of its earlier programming after the relaunch. The channel also aired brief weather forecasts and daily news segments without narration, using only visuals and background music. On December 18, 2013, Grupo Abril announced the sale of Ideal TV's frequencies to Grupo Spring de Comunicação, a company owned by José Roberto Maluf, former vice president of SBT and Band. On June 26, 2014, the Garcia brothers, José Roberto and Paulo Sérgio, owners of Kalunga, became partners with José Roberto Maluf in Spring Televisão S/A, which owned Ideal TV, broadcasting on UHF channel 32 and digital channel 31. In December 2017, José Roberto Maluf sold his stake in Spring Televisão S/A—the parent company of Ideal TV—to brothers José Roberto Garcia and Paulo Sérgio Garcia, who had been involved in management since June 2014. On December 7, 2020, the infrastructure previously used by Ideal TV began carrying the new channel Loading, which launched on over-the-air television and via retransmitters on the same day. Ideal TV continued to operate exclusively on analog satellite television. On May 27, 2021, the channel Loading laid off all its employees and ceased original programming, switching to reruns and third-party content. Six months later, on November 28, 2021, the channel was discontinued, and Ideal TV resumed broadcasting in its place, using the same transmitters on the same day. From May 28, 2021, until the end of its broadcasts on August 6, 2025, Ideal TV rebroadcast third-party programming and fulfilled a two-hour daily mandatory news requirement. During these years, the station leased 22 hours of its daily schedule to Rede Mundial, a network owned by Valdemiro Santiago, founder of the Igreja Mundial do Poder de Deus.

=== Pre-launch and launch of Xsports ===
On 13 November 2024, Brazilian media reported that brothers José Roberto Garcia and Paulo Sérgio Garcia, owners of the Kalunga Group's Ideal TV channel, were planning to launch a new sports channel named Xsports. According to reports by Flávio Ricco, a columnist for the Léo Dias portal, the proposed channel would replace Ideal TV, which broadcasts on UHF frequency 32 in São Paulo via open and satellite signals. During Sportel, a sports media trade fair held in Monte Carlo in October 2024, the group reportedly expressed interest in acquiring broadcasting rights. If launched, Xsports would become Brazil’s first open-television channel dedicated to sports since the closure of Esporte Interativo in 2018.

In December 2024, Grupo Kalunga launched the website Xsports.com.br, accompanied by the announcement, "A New Sports Channel Is Coming". The statement fueled speculation and raised public expectations for the channel’s planned mid-2025 debut. However, by February 2025, reports indicated that the initiative faced challenges, including high operational costs and limited availability of desirable broadcasting rights. Sources stated that the group was exploring alternatives such as airing matches from the lower divisions of the Campeonato Brasileiro and collaborating with independent producers and journalists to develop programming. Additionally, the channel intended to integrate existing YouTube content, including podcasts and specialized sports programs, into its lineup.

On June 9, 2025, the Garcia family confirmed advanced negotiations with ESPN Brazil for a strategic partnership to facilitate the transition of the Ideal TV channel to Xsports, with a planned launch in August 2025. The agreement involves Xsports inheriting Ideal TV’s infrastructure, including its satellite distribution network. ESPN is expected to provide selected content for free-to-air broadcasting, including matches from major European football leagues such as the Premier League, La Liga, and Serie A. Henrique Meira, formerly of BandSports, has been appointed as the director of sports for Xsports. Reports also indicate that the channel has secured sponsorship from a betting company, though details about the sponsor remain undisclosed.

On July 24, 2025, Grupo Kalunga and ESPN Brasil announced an agreement for programming that resulted in the rebranding of the Ideal TV channel to Xsports. Inspired by the now-defunct Esporte Interativo, the channel adopts the slogan “Emoção de Verdade,” promising 24-hour sports programming. The new programming is set to begin on August 16, 2025, focusing on sports content, especially soccer. Xsports sublicenses the broadcasting rights for various soccer competitions, including the Premier League, La Liga, Serie A, Primeira Liga, EFL Championship, Copa del Rey, and DFB-Pokal. ESPN has priority in selecting the games to be aired, while a dedicated team from Xsports is responsible for managing the channel's content. The programming lineup includes shows such as SportsCenter, Linha de Passe, Bola da Vez, and Resenha ESPN.

On August 6, 2025, Channel 32, the defunct MTV Brasil, ceased operations as Ideal TV and the broadcast of the Worldwide Church of God’s Power. From that date, a looping vignette for Xsports went on air, announcing the channel's new programming, with the official launch scheduled for August 16, 2025. At that time, the programming included 22 hours of church content. The launch campaign was promoted through digital media and out-of-home (OOH) advertising in the capitals of São Paulo and Rio de Janeiro.

On August 16, 2025, Xsports officially launched at 10 a.m. local time, beginning its inaugural broadcast with the program Tapete Verde. The channel's first live soccer transmission, featuring the Premier League match between Tottenham and Burnley, started at 11 a.m. Brasília time. Xsports occupies broadcast frequencies previously assigned to Ideal TV, including UHF digital channel 32 in Greater São Paulo. The channel is also available in other regions via digital satellite antennas and subscription television services, and is accessible across multiple digital media and streaming platforms. Headquartered in the building formerly occupied by MTV Brasil in São Paulo, Xsports operates 24 hours a day, providing live sports coverage and sports-related programming. On the same day, August 16, 2025, commercial director Thiago Garcia introduced Xsports, the first over-the-air television channel in Brazil dedicated exclusively to sports broadcasting. Garcia stated that negotiations for the rights to major football leagues—including those of England, Spain, Italy, and Germany—were initiated at international events such as Sportel in Monaco and Miami. The channel currently airs events such as Novo Basquete Brasil, NASCAR Cup Series, the Copa Argentina, and the J1 League. On its premiere day, Xsports beat TV Gazeta in open television ratings. During its debut, it tied with Redevida and TV Aparecida, ranking close to RedeTV! and reaching fourth place at several points throughout the day. At its peak, it tied with RedeTV!, registering a 0.2 audience point during the broadcast of the German Super Cup. From 16 to 18 August 2025, Xsports drew a total audience of 2.5 million viewers, averaging 3.1 household rating points. The peak audience was 0.41 rating points on 18 August, surpassing the previous record of 0.33 set on 17 August during the broadcast of Alverca v Braga in the Portuguese Championship. On August 22, 2025, Xsports acquired the broadcast rights to the Bundesliga on free-to-air television. On August 23, 2025, Xsports recorded a viewership record during the broadcast of the Premier League match between Arsenal and Leeds, where Arsenal won 5-0. According to data from Kantar Ibope Media, the network reached a peak audience rating of 0.7 points in São Paulo, positioning itself as the fourth largest broadcaster in open television. On August 29, 2025, Brazilian media reported that, in its first 13 days of operation, Xsports reached over 6.1 million viewers nationwide, averaging more than 1 million viewers per day. From August 16 to September 16, 2025, Xsports was viewed by approximately 10.7 million people, according to Kantar Ibope Media data. On November 17, 2025, the Xsports channel became available on Disney+.

On August 6, 2026, Xsports announced the acquisition of broadcasting rights for the Saudi Pro League. The three-season agreement covers the 2026–27, 2027–28, and 2028–29 seasons.
