= PlayTV (Brazilian TV channel) =

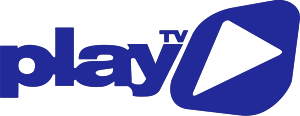
- Country: Brazil
- Broadcast area: Brazil
- Headquarters: São Paulo (SP)

Programming
- Language: Portuguese
- Picture format: 1080i (HDTV)

Ownership
- Owner: Alexandre Zalcman
- Parent: PlayTV Televisão Ltda
- Key people: Alexandre Zalcman (Chairman and CEO)

History
- Launched: June 5, 2006; 20 years ago
- Founder: Fábio Luis Lula da Silva
- Former names: GameTV (2005–2006); TV Walter Abrahão (2020–2022)

Links
- Website: playtv.com.br

PlayTV is a Brazilian subscription television channel, also available on free-to-air satellite television (TVRO), launched on June 5, 2006, by Fábio Luis Lula da Silva, son of President Luiz Inácio Lula da Silva, and is currently owned by businessman Alexandre Zalcman. The channel's programming primarily focuses on content related to anime, culture of South Korea, pop culture, movies, games, musics and series.

== History ==
=== Background ===
==== G4 Brasil (2003–2006) ====
G4 Brasil and G4 Brasil Drops were Brazilian television programs focused on video game news and releases, broadcast by Rede Bandeirantes from 31 August 2003 to 31 March 2006. Produced by G4 Entretenimento e Tecnologia Digital Ltda., by Fábio Luis Lula da Silva, the shows were initially hosted by Luciano Amaral and Luiza Gottschalk and drew inspiration from the American channel G4TV. While G4 Brasil (30 minutes) featured game tips and international segments in its early years, it later shifted to superficial coverage of new releases, often overlaying gameplay with background music. The shorter spin-off G4 Brasil Drops (5 minutes) followed a similar format.

==== GameTV (2005–2006) ====
Gamecorp S.A., a Brazilian technology and gaming company, was founded in December 2004 by Fábio Luís Lula da Silva in partnership with entrepreneurs Fernando Bittar and Kalil Bittar, along with telecommunications company Oi (then known as Telemar). With an initial registered capital of R$10,000, the company commenced operations in March 2005. Gamecorp S.A. launched GameTV, a television channel dedicated to video games, on 23 June 2005. The channel leased the 5:00 p.m. to 10:00 p.m. time slot on Mix TV (owned by Grupo Mix de Comunicação), airing programs such as PlayHit, Combo Fala + Joga, and GameZone. According to Ibope, GameTV averaged 0.56 rating points between June 2005 and April 2006, outperforming MTV Brasil (0.34 points in the same period). On April 24, 2006, Gamecorp Group and Mix Communications Group ended their partnership, leading to the removal of GameTV from Mix TV's programming. On May 2, 2006, GameTV began airing on Rede 21 (owned by Grupo Bandeirantes), occupying the 6:00 PM to 10:00 PM time slot following an agreement between the two companies. The new lineup included anime series such as Yu Yu Hakusho, Saint Seiya, and Tenchi Muyo!, alongside the live-action series Star Trek and The Incredible Hulk. Gaming-focused programs like PlayHit, GameZone, and Combo Fala + Joga, originally produced during GameTV's partnership with Mix TV (2005–2006), were retained on the channel's Rede 21 schedule. In May 2006, the channel reportedly achieved notable viewership on Rede 21, surpassing MTV Brasil in ratings during that period.

=== Rebranding as PlayTV (June 2006) ===
On June 5, 2006, GameTV was rebranded as PlayTV, introducing new programs in collaboration with Rede 21, such as Disparada and Vale 10. The channel expanded its broadcast hours from 5:00 PM to midnight, retaining anime series like Saint Seiya and incorporating original content from Grupo Bandeirantes, alongside infomercials.

=== First phase (2006–2008) ===
During its initial operations, PlayTV competed with MTV Brasil in the UHF broadcasting band. According to audience measurement reports from June to November 2006, PlayTV reportedly achieved higher viewership ratings than MTV Brasil during this period. Programs such as Vale 10 and Disparada—both focused on music videos—were cited as contributors to the channel's audience growth. This competition reportedly prompted MTV Brasil to reduce its investment in music video programming in 2007. PlayTV's programming also included anime series and the variety show "Combo Fala + Joga", which, according to IBOPE ratings, occasionally reached peaks of up to 5 points in the Greater São Paulo region. The channel debuted on June 5, 2006, with the anime series Saint Seiya, which remained part of its lineup until February 2008.

On June 10, 2006, PlayTV launched the technology-focused program Olhar Digital, hosted by Marisa Silva. The one-hour show aired weekly on Saturdays from 22:00 to 23:00. On June 21, 2006, Gamecorp, PlayTV's parent company, announced a partnership with Camargo Comunicação's radio station 89 FM to rebrand it as Rádio 89 Play and adapt the channel's programming for radio. The project, however, was discontinued shortly afterward. Throughout 2006, PlayTV aired several international series, including Out of This World, Sex and the City, That '70s Show, Family Affair, and The X-Files.

On March 5, 2007, PlayTV launched the Japanese animation block Otacraze, a partnership between PlayTV and Cloverway, a media licensing agency for Japanese animations. This collaboration marked the first time anime series aimed at young adults were broadcast on Brazilian free-to-air television. The initial programming featured six series, starting with Ranma ½, followed by Samurai Champloo, Love Hina, and Trigun. The anime Gungrave and Heat Guy J were announced but ultimately never aired. All broadcast series were fully dubbed and presented uncensored. PlayTV was broadcast from March 30, 2007, to July 7, 2008, on the 1240 MHz horizontal polarization frequency of the Brasilsat B4 satellite, which was owned by Rede 21. This transmission occurred under a partnership agreement between PlayTV and Rede 21. In April 2007, PlayTV partnered with Rede Bandeirantes to broadcast the Honda Grand Prix of St. Petersburg IndyCar race. That same month, the network aired an exclusive trailer for the animated film The Simpsons Movie. PlayTV also televised programs such as Vale 10, Playzone, and Combo during 2007. On 2 May 2007, PlayTV entered into negotiations with Grupo Bandeirantes to expand its daily programming to 12 hours on Rede 21. However, the talks ultimately stalled and did not result in an agreement. From August to December 2007, the channel PlayTV broadcast a variety of programming, including +Esporte (sports), Terra Sonora (music), Combo Shake (entertainment), and episodes of the documentary series E! True Hollywood Story. These programs covered topics ranging from sports analysis to music exploration and celebrity biographies. On October 8, 2007, PlayTV launched the program GamePlay in partnership with Action Midia, a division of Endemol's Brazilian branch. Airing Monday through Friday at 8:30 pm, the show was hosted by Luiza Gottschalk and Luciano Amaral. During its run, GamePlay achieved an average audience share of 0.79%, peaking at 1.04%.

In 2008, PlayTV, in partnership with Rede 21, broadcast a diverse lineup focusing on entertainment, pop culture, and journalism. Notable programs dedicated to gaming, film, and music included Disparada, Vale Dez, Playhit, Playzone, Cine Play, Combo, and Vitamina T. The network also produced news programming, such as Jornal Dez, and the talk show Saca-Rolha, hosted by Marcelo Tas, Mariana Weickert, and Lobão. Its schedule additionally featured Japanese anime series, including Saint Seiya. In 2008, PlayTV introduced several new programs, including Pop Box, Clip da Hora, Semana Playzone, DVD Play, Eu Q Mando, Vale 20, and Cinema Play, as part of efforts to diversify its content offerings. The lineup also included the program Larry King Live. On 13 February 2008, PlayTV launched the children's and adolescent-focused programme TV Kids, targeting viewers aged 0 to 16. Airing on Saturdays and Sundays from 10:30 a.m. to 11:00 a.m., the show was produced in partnership with Matel Comunicações. It featured segments on entertainment tips, cultural content, and consumer product suggestions. On March 3, 2008, PlayTV announced the discontinuation of the Otacraze programming block, along with standalone anime series such as Saint Seiya and Yu Yu Hakusho. The same day, the channel introduced two new anime titles: Legend of the Dragon and Monster Rancher, with the latter replacing Saint Seiya in its 7:00 p.m. time slot. On April 7, 2008, the channel PlayTV began airing the first season of the animated series The Adventures of Tintin. Episodes were broadcast weekly on Mondays at 23:30. From May to July 2008, PlayTV aired the Canadian animated series 6Teen at 19:00. On July 7, 2008, PlayTV's broadcast was interrupted by Rede 21 (channel 21 UHF in São Paulo and analog satellite). The interruption occurred after the expiration of the partnership contract between Grupo Bandeirantes (owner of Rede 21) and Grupo Gamecorp (owner of PlayTV), whose original agreement was set to last ten years. Following the end of the partnership with Rede 21, the channel began exploring new partnership proposals to resume broadcasting, while its programming was made available online through the Joost TV portal.

=== Second phase (2008–2020) ===
From July 7 to November 10, 2008, PlayTV was temporarily broadcast via internet streaming. On November 11, 2008, the channel was relaunched and began broadcasting as a subscription television service, available on Sky channel 86 and NET channel 13 in Brasília. In 2008, during its new programming phase, PlayTV retained music video shows such as Eu Q Mando, Disparada, and Clip da Hora. The channel also began airing comedy series, including the Brazilian sitcom Mateus, the Clerk, starring actor Mateus Solano as the titular character.

On March 23, 2009, channel PlayTV introduced Beto Lee, son of musician Rita Lee, and Bianca Jhordão as hosts of the daily program Combo Fala + Joga, which aired at 10 p.m. Bianca Jhordão, a singer, also hosted the film-focused program Cineplay and its weekend spin-offs DVDPlay and CinemaPlay, which covered cinematic news and behind-the-scenes content. On April 16, 2009, PlayTV restructured its programming to adopt a more dynamic format. The channel reduced its reliance on music video broadcasts and expanded its diversified content lineup by hiring new presenters. This shift aimed to broaden the network's appeal beyond its original music-centric focus.

In January 2010, PlayTV organized the event Southern Rock Week to promote bands from southern Brazil. Musicians from groups such as Júpiter Maçã, Copacabana Club, and Wander Wildner were invited to curate music videos for broadcast. The event featured works by national and international artists as part of an initiative to highlight diverse musical influences. Programming aired during prime time, following the channel's regular schedule. On 11 March 2010, PlayTV expanded its availability by entering the programming of the Oi TV operator, becoming accessible on channel 30 for fiber-optic subscribers and channel 430 for satellite viewers. A revamped version of the program Eu Q Mando! titled Eu Q Mando! Twitter debuted on May 18, 2010. The new format allowed viewers to request music videos via the social media platform Twitter using the program's designated hashtag. On July 6, 2010, PlayTV explored reintroducing anime to its programming in response to audience demand. However, high acquisition and production costs presented challenges. The channel reportedly engaged in discussions with potential partners interested in broadcasting their content on the network. Three years later, in 2013, PlayTV officially announced the return of anime, scheduling two series to air in a daily one-hour block. The program Udigrudi, focused on independent music artists and bands, premiered on 5 September 2010.

On August 12, 2011, PlayTV unveiled a comprehensive rebranding initiative, introducing its first logo redesign since the channel's launch. The new visual identity included three distinct logo variants, each color-coded for specific programming categories: yellow (music), pink (cinema), and green (gaming). This overhaul extended to updated on-air graphics, revamped sets for existing shows, and refreshed presentation formats, reflecting a strategic effort to modernize the network's image and content. Concurrently, PlayTV expanded its programming lineup with new shows such as PlayTV News (a weekly 30-minute news program covering gaming, music, and lifestyle), Versus (a viewer-voted musical competition), Interferência (daily genre-expert-curated music videos), Caliente (daily uncensored sensual music videos), O Som Que Você Ouve (a weekly street survey of public music preferences), GameTV (daily gaming news and analysis), Go!Game (weekly coverage of upcoming game releases), and Playhit Gore (a fusion of game visuals and music tracks). Existing programs like Playhit, Ponto Pop, Ponto Pop 10, and Timeline were also updated to align with the rebranding. On December 4, 2011, the channel launched Live Play, a weekly live music series produced in partnership with Itaú Cultural. Airing Sundays at 10:30 PM, the show debuted with a performance by O Teatro Mágico, featuring their production Segundo Ato.

On March 14, 2012, PlayTV began broadcasting on the TVA subscription-television service on channel 16. Prior to this, the network had already been carried by the Sky and OiTV platforms, as well as by NeoTV affiliates. On 15 and 16 June 2012, PlayTV premiered two new series: Hi#Tag, hosted by Luciano Amaral, which examined the history of video games; and Moviola, presented by Rodolfo Rodrigues, devoted to cinema-related topics. On June 16, 2012, the programmes PlayTV News and Ponto Pop introduced new hosts. Actress Bruna Thedy took over as presenter of PlayTV News, and singer Mel Ravasio became presenter of Ponto Pop.

On January 17, 2013, PlayTV returned to Sky's channel lineup after receiving the "Brazilian qualified space channel" certification from the National Film Agency (Ancine). With this certification, the channel was reinstated on Sky's programming, occupying channel 86. Additionally, the channel became available through providers Claro, Oi TV, NET, and Vivo TV, reaching 95% coverage of pay-TV operators in Brazil. On April 15, 2013, PlayTV premiered the program Qu4tro Coisas, based on the YouTube channel of the same name. The show featured analysis of pop culture topics. On August 12, 2013, PlayTV premiered the television program Miolos Fritos, originally produced for YouTube. This marked the second instance of a YouTube-originated series being broadcast by the channel, following Qu4tro Coisas. The program aired new episodes weekly on Fridays at 21:00, with daily reruns at 11:45 and 21:00, and remained available on its creators' YouTube channel. On August 17, 2013, PlayTV launched Estúdio Play, a weekly music program hosted by Rafaela Tomasi. Recorded at São Paulo's Dissenso Studios, the series featured live performances and interviews with musicians from genres such as rap, rock, and MPB (música popular brasileira; Brazilian popular music). On October 25, 2013, PlayTV premiered Avesso, a program produced by Pset Criações e Produções. The show focused on showcasing the behind-the-scenes processes of communication strategies employed by major brands, covering segments such as innovation, events, sports, campaigns, and socio-environmental initiatives. Additionally, Avesso featured coverage of events within the communication industry.

On January 7, 2014, PlayTV announced, through its CEO Cauê Coelho, that it would broadcast the Copa São Paulo de Futebol Júnior. On January 11 and 12 of the same month, the network aired two matches as a trial in partnership with Rede Vida. On February 14, 2014, the channel PlayTV launched a weekly show titled Interferência – Neo Funk, dedicated to showcasing music videos from the funk genre. The program aired in the early morning hours. On March 12, 2014, the channel PlayTV announced on its website the broadcast of the anime series Bleach and Death Note in dubbed versions, following agreements with distributors and licensors disclosed during the Rio Content Market event. The anime premiered starting from April 10, 2014, the same day PlayTV launched Rockoala, a program hosted by Rodrigo Koala, lead vocalist of the band Hateen. The show explored rock 'n' roll influences in daily life, including cuisine, fashion, soccer, visual arts, and video games. On April 11, 2014, PlayTV premiered the documentary series "O Videogame no Brasil", which explored the history of the video game industry in Brazil, addressing aspects such as the market, society, and economy. The series aired at 10:00 PM and consisted of 26 episodes, each lasting half an hour. On April 13, 2014, PlayTV premiered the program Ichiban, a weekly magazine show inspired by the former Interferência Ichiban block (originally dedicated to K-Pop). The new format expanded its scope to cover Eastern pop culture as a whole, including music (K-Pop and other genres), anime, manga, Asian cinema, technology, and trends. Hosted by Frana Ayumi, the program aired on Sundays at 6:00 PM. On 14 August 2014, PlayTV premiered the 26-episode documentary series Hoje Eu Desafio o Mundo Sem Sair da Minha Casa (Today I Challenge the World Without Leaving My Home). The series starred Marcelo Yuka, former drummer and co-founder of the Brazilian fusion band O Rappa, as its central subject and was based on Yuka's book of the same name.

On January 27, 2015, PlayTV began airing promotional bumpers announcing some of its new content, including the anime series Naruto Shippuden and Yu-Gi-Oh! Duel Monsters. These shows were presented as part of the channel's new programming lineup, though details regarding their premiere dates, airing schedules, and episode counts were not disclosed. On March 23, 2015, PlayTV premiered the first season of the anime series Yu-Gi-Oh! Duel Monsters, which aired at 4:30 PM. On April 6, 2015, PlayTV announced a new programming schedule, featuring several new programs. These included the comedy program Jorgecast, the pop culture program Pipocando, the crime reality program Show de Polícia, the satirical series Os Amargos, and the documentary series History of Brazilian Rock. On April 7, 2015, PlayTV premiered the anime Naruto Shippuden. The following day, April 8, 2015, the channel premiered new episodes of Bleach, an anime series it had previously broadcast. On May 23, 2015, PlayTV launched Ponto K-Pop, a version of its Ponto Pop program dedicated exclusively to the K-pop music genre. This marked the broadcaster's third program focused on K-pop, following the earlier introduction of the Interferência Ichiban segment several months prior. In July 2015, PlayTV aired a Sunday anime marathon featuring six consecutive hours of programming. The event included four episodes each from the following series: Bleach, Yu-Gi-Oh!, and Naruto Shippuden. On 7 July 2015, PlayTV premiered three new programmes. The first, entitled Rock in Time, explored the history of rock music. The second, titled Torneios, was a series on sports and competitions in Brazil produced in partnership with the production company Medialand. The third program, Manual do Mundo na TV, adapted the popular YouTube channel Manual do Mundo for television, presenting science experiments and DIY projects. On November 13, 2015, PlayTV announced plans to air new episodes of the anime series Bleach and Naruto Shippuden in 2016. The channel also indicated ongoing negotiations to acquire additional anime titles for broadcast within the same year. However, due to financial constraints and low profitability, the project was ultimately canceled.

On May 2, 2016, PlayTV became available on Claro TV (channel 118), completing its coverage across all national satellite providers in Brazil. Prior to this date, the channel was already carried by TVA (channel 16), Sky (channel 86), CTBC (channel 280), and Oi TV (channel 109). On May 16, 2016, Cauê Coelho, the CEO of PlayTV, participated in a press interview regarding the channel's investments in anime and Oriental pop culture. He discussed the launch of Brazilian-produced series related to anime, manga, Oriental culture, and video games. Coelho also mentioned a proposed subscription model for the channel in collaboration with pay-TV operators, which did not progress. On 10 June 2016, PlayTV premiered the weekly programme Fundo Verde, presented by Rodolfo Rodrigues and broadcast every Friday. Fundo Verde was the first programme created by the channel for exclusive release on its YouTube page. On July 8, 2016, PlayTV announced a partnership with Toque de Mídias Filmes, based in Fortaleza, Ceará. The collaboration involved broadcasting the television series Detona Play. The contract was signed by Rodrigo Lariú, who was serving as the channel's production manager at the time. On July 18, 2016, PlayTV premiered Bunka Pop, a program exploring topics such as music, technology, anime, film, video game, fashion, and fictional characters, with a focus on East Asian popular culture. The series aired 24 half-hour episodes and was hosted by Jack Freitas and Maria Luiza. On August 13, 2016, the PlayTV channel premiered the documentary series Hackers, produced by Medialand. The series focused on topics related to hacker subculture and cybersecurity. It originally aired weekly on Saturdays at 9:30 p.m., with reruns broadcast on Tuesdays and Thursdays at the same time. Each episode averaged 25 minutes in length.

On February 23, 2017, PlayTV premiered the program Glitch, which focused on video games. The series was hosted by Luciano Amaral, who returned to the network to helm the show. Amaral had previously presented several PlayTV programs related to gaming and pop culture, including Combo Fala + Joga, PlayZone, High#Tag, Go! Game, and MOK. On March 9, 2017, the anime series Naruto Shippuden and Bleach were removed from PlayTV's programming schedule following the expiration of the channel's broadcast agreement with Viz Media. As a result, only Yu‑Gi‑Oh! remained on the channel's lineup. On April 24, 2017, PlayTV premiered the musical reality show Mixados. The programme was produced in partnership with the São Paulo–based production company Academia de Filmes. Mixados ran for eight weekly episodes, each with a runtime of 50 minutes. On June 18, 2017, PlayTV premiered the television program Game Over, hosted by Arthur Ribas. Originally launched in 2006, the show had become familiar to audiences on YouTube and on Rede Bandeirantes, with which PlayTV maintained a partnership from 2006 to 2008. The format was later expanded to encompass video‑game and e‑sports content. On June 19, 2017, PlayTV premiered the fourth season of the anime series Bleach, which began airing at 2:00 p.m. (UTC−3). On June 20, 2017, PlayTV premiered the documentary series Ressonância, which focused on the behind-the-scenes of the independent music scene. The series consisted of 44 half-hour episodes.

On May 1, 2018, the channel PlayTV premiered the series Geek, which consisted of twenty half‑hour episodes dedicated to nerd culture. The series was produced in collaboration with the production company Medialand and was broadcast on Tuesdays at 10 p.m.

On June 10, 2019, PlayTV premiered the television series Geek Tour Adventures, a travel‑themed program exploring geek culture. The series was hosted by Rodrigo Luna and produced in partnership with the Bahia‑based production company Movioca, comprising ten episodes . On December 18, 2019, PlayTV premiered the program Mais Geek, marking the return of anime to its lineup after a one-year absence. Hosted by Clayton Ferreira, Jefferson Kayo, and Anderson Abraços, the program covered topics related to pop culture and featured weekly broadcasts of dubbed anime series. The debut episode included the anime Re:Zero − Starting Life in Another World, in partnership with Crunchyroll. The following week, on December 25, 2019, the anime Darling in the Franxx premiered, also in partnership with Crunchyroll.

=== Ownership transfer and rebranding of PlayTV to TV Walter Abrahão (2020–2022) ===
On May 9, 2020, Fábio Luís Lula da Silva (known as Lulinha) and his partners, Fernando and Kalil Bittar, sold 70 percent of the shares of Gamecorp S.A., the holding company of the PlayTV channel, to entrepreneur Walter Abrahão Filho. At the same time, the telecommunications operator Oi (formerly Telemar), which held the remaining 30 percent of the shares, also divested its stake. The value of the transactions was not disclosed. On May 16, 2020, the channel PlayTV was renamed TV Walter Abrahão (TV WA), accompanied by significant changes to its programming: the geek‑oriented content was replaced by a more varied lineup, although some original shows were retained as reruns. The new schedule officially launched on August 1, 2020.

In March 2022, businessman Jaime Egídio Ferreira Junior acquired a portion of TV WA's shares from Walther Abrahão Filho. The channel retained the name TV Walter Abrahão (TV WA) until the end of June that year. In July 2022, Alexandre Zalcman acquired the remaining shares from Abrahão Filho, consolidating ownership under the new corporate name PlayTV Televisão Ltda. and reinstating the trade name PlayTV, with Jaime Egídio and Zalcman as owners. On October 4, 2022, the new owners announced on social media that PlayTV would be relaunched. According to the announcement, the channel—formerly known as TV WA—was to resume broadcasting on October 5, 2022, retaining its existing channel positions on Claro, Oi, Sky, and Gigabyte.

=== Third phase (2022–present) ===
On October 5, 2022, at 6:00 p.m. BRT, PlayTV resumed broadcasting with an experimental transmission, utilizing the same frequencies previously occupied by TV Walter Abrahão (TV WA). PlayTV underwent significant changes to its programming between October 2022 and May 2023. During this period, the channel featured an atypical lineup characterized by independent content and infomercials, due to contractual difficulties that impacted the production of original programming.

As of May 5, 2023, PlayTV began investing in original programming, returning to the roots of its earlier phases. This included the introduction of new music video shows, such as Clip Combo, Clipe Mais, and Re-Play. On May 8, 2023, PlayTV announced the return of content aimed at the geek audience in its programming, in partnership with the streaming platform Yeeaah. This collaboration encompasses content from the realms of gaming, music, pop culture, and geek culture. Additionally, since its relaunch, PlayTV has become available on 98% of cable television providers and reaches 100% of the national territory through a digital satellite signal. From May 13 to May 19, 2023, PlayTV introduced several new music video programs to its lineup, including Estação Retrô, Clip K, 100% Brasil, Vitaminado, Faixa Clip, and Clip de Agora. Clip K and Vitaminado are revivals of the former shows Ponto K-Pop and Vitamina, respectively. The channel also premiered Yeeaah Pix, which explores geek culture, and Yeeaah Next Play, dedicated to the gaming universe. Additionally, the channel launched Meus 2 Centavos, produced in collaboration with YouTuber Tiago Belotti, which discusses movies, television series, and video games. The entrepreneurship podcast Zalcast was retained in the revised programming. On May 21, 2023, Alexandre Zalcman acquired full ownership of the PlayTV channel by purchasing the share of his partner, Jaime Egídio Ferreira Júnior, who subsequently ceased to be a co-owner.

On June 6, 2023, the PlayTV channel launched the program Yeeaah Playhit in partnership with the streaming platform YEEAAH. The format addresses topics related to music and gaming, resembling the defunct PlayHit, which was aired during earlier phases of the channel. On June 12, 2023, PlayTV launched the children's program Playground. The show featured animated series such as Os Chocolix, Fofão, Giramille, Mongo e Drongo, and Bia e Jean during the network's morning programming. Starting on June 15, 2023, the PlayTV channel began streaming its programming through the ScalaPlay platform, followed by the Soul TV platform on June 20, 2023. On June 29, 2023, PlayTV launched the program Tecla SAP, a show dedicated to the broadcast of subtitled music videos.

On July 5, 2023, PlayTV launched a comedy program titled Planeta Podcast. The show featured relaxed and improvised conversations with comedians and other personalities, primarily exploring the world of cinema. It was broadcast every Wednesday at 8 PM, with a duration of one hour. On July 10, 2023, PlayTV launches PLAY LO-FI, a 30-minute segment dedicated to lo-fi music videos and remixes, hosted by Brazilian producer Felipe Satierf. On July 21, 2023, PlayTV launched the program Musical Intelligence, featuring a selection of music videos curated by artificial intelligence chatbots.

On August 2, 2023, PlayTV began broadcasting nationwide in Brazil through free-to-air satellite television (TVRO), using the StarOne D2 satellite positioned at 70° West in the Ku band. The channel is available at 11,780 MHz, with a symbol rate of 29,900 and horizontal polarization, joining traditional channels such as Globo and SBT. Additionally, the channel is known as Play+ (PlayTV Mais) on channel 574 in high definition (HDTV). On August 2 and 3, 2023, PlayTV premiered the shows Ponto Pop and Eu Q Mando, respectively. Ponto Pop, hosted by Bruno Polidoro, focuses on pop culture, covering music, movies, series, and entertainment. Meanwhile, Eu Q Mando allows the audience to decide the winners of music video battles in real time, featuring showdowns between major artists. On August 9, 2023, the channel PlayTV began broadcasting the South Korean television series I'm Not a Robot every day at 7:00 p.m. BRT, with a repeat at 11:00 a.m. the following morning, marking the network's first venture into Korean-drama programming. On August 16, 2023, the channel PlayTV launched the program "TV Clube Coreia," which focuses on Korean culture and is hosted by writer Yoo Na Kim. Two days later, on August 18, 2023, PlayTV reintroduced the program CinePlay, featuring licensed content from the film distributor A2 Filmes. As part of this relaunch, the film Lupin III was included in the channel's programming. On August 21, 2023, PlayTV announced its integration with the streaming service Zapping, making it available to subscribers on channel 113. On August 31, 2023, PlayTV launched the program Antimatéria, which focused on the coverage of anime, films, series, and video games. The program shared similarities with the now-defunct show Mais Geek, which also aired on PlayTV. Antimatéria was broadcast at 8 PM and was hosted by Anderson Abraços, Clayton Ferreira, and Jeff Kayo, who were known to viewers from their previous work on Mais Geek. On the same day, PlayTV premiered Adventures of Sonic the Hedgehog, the first animated series featuring the character Sonic, as part of the Antimatéria program, with all episodes made available to viewers.

During September 2023, PlayTV aired several films as part of its CinePlay program, including The Taking of Tiger Mountain on the 8th, The Fatal Raid (2019) on the 15th, Wild Camping (2019) on the 22nd, and The King's Avatar on the 29th. All broadcasts aired on Fridays at 9:00 PM Brasília time. On September 4, 2023, the PlayTV channel began broadcasting the programming of Placar TV, the YouTube channel of the sports magazine Placar, integrating various sports-focused shows into its lineup. The main additions include Tribunal Placar, sports debate program that uses a courtroom format to discuss current and historical sports topics with humor; Placar Entrevista, talk show featuring figures from Brazilian soccer covering aspects of their careers and personal lives; and content from 1v9, a channel dedicated to eSports and video games, covering titles such as League of Legends, Free Fire, Counter-Strike, and Valorant.

On October 12, 2023, PlayTV premiered two anime series, Katekyō Hitman Reborn! and Yowamushi Pedal, as part of its programming block Antimatéria, which aired on Thursdays from 7:00 PM to 8:00 PM. On October 13, 2023, PlayTV launched the Anime Onegai TV block as a result of a partnership with the anime platform Anime Onegai. The block was originally broadcast every Friday from 8 PM to 9:00 PM and featured a variety of anime series, including: B-Project Passion*Love Call, Natsume Yujin-cho, Zombie-Loan, Full Moon wo Sagashite, Mog Mog Planet, and Fate/kaleid liner Prisma Illya. On October 24, 2023, PlayTV Televisão Ltda., a media company and owner of the PlayTV channel, launched a new channel called Play+, also known as PlayTV+. The channel premiered on the video on demand and streaming service SóPlay on the same day.

On November 28, 2023, PlayTV began broadcasting its programming 24 hours a day on Twitch via its official profile, PlayTVoficial. On 28 and 29 November 2023, the television programs Cronosfera, focusing on pop culture analysis, and Assopra Fitas, dedicated to video game culture, premiered on PlayTV's broadcasting schedule.

On December 1, 2023, PlayTV Televisão Ltda. launched Play+ (PlayTV+) on Sky Brasil's Nova Parabólica-TVRO-Sky Brasil 1 DTH satellite service (channel 58), featuring content not broadcast on its main PlayTV channel. On December 6, 2023, the signal for PlayTV was replaced by Agro Canal. This change occurred at a frequency of 3994 MHz, with horizontal polarization and a symbol rate of 12415 kS/s, in the C band of the Star One D2 satellite. On December 19, 2023, PlayTV Televisão Ltda., the owner of the PlayTV and Play+ television channels, launched both channels on the Doozy TV streaming platform, which provides live television broadcasts. At their launch, PlayTV was assigned to channel 105, and Play+ was assigned to channel 58.

On January 31, 2024, PlayTV premiered Play Na Faixa, hosted by Hariana Meinke. The program features audience-selected music videos, encompassing both classic hits and recent releases.

On February 1, 2024, PlayTV Televisão Ltda revamped the format of its program, Ponto Pop, which was broadcast on both the PlayTV channel and the Play+ channel, available on channel 58 of the new TVRO satellite service from Sky Brasil. The program reintroduced segments such as Top 3 and Você VJ, and added a new segment called Versus, where viewers voted on music videos through social media. Hosted by Bruno Polidoro (Br Polidoro), the program aired on Wednesdays at 6:30 PM (BRT, UTC−3). On February 22, 2024, PlayTV launched Play News, a program that covers updated information on pop culture, music, and movies. The program combines elements of news and entertainment. Viewers can submit topic suggestions through social media using the hashtag #PlayNews. The program is hosted by Leonardo Zalcman, who is the director of content for the channel.

On March 7, 2024, the program Cronosfera Cinema premiered on PlayTV. This show is dedicated to exploring the geek universe and cinema, offering in-depth analyses of current themes and trends within these domains.

On April 8, 2024, PlayTV began broadcasting a selection of anime in partnership with the streaming platform Anime Onegai. The collaboration was announced on March 28, 2024, when Anime Onegai published a list of anime titles to be featured on PlayTV's programming. The lineup included Brave 10 (dubbed), Canaan, Fist of the North Star: Legends of the Dark King, Getter Robo Armageddon, The Legend of Heroes: Trails in the Sky, Mazinkaiser, Mazinkaiser SKL, Needless, and Tears to Tiara.

On May 22, 2024, PlayTV premiered the documentary series Batalha da Aldeia, a seven-episode exploration of the origins and development of São Paulo's first rapping battle. The series, aired weekly, highlighted the cultural significance of the Batalha da Aldeia, a prominent rapping battle event in Brazil, and featured participants who had appeared in the Netflix series Sintonia.

On June 5, 2024, PlayTV premiered História dos Games, a documentary series about the evolution and cultural impact of video games and the stories behind influential titles. The series is hosted by Leão Dourado (Matheus Carvalho), a YouTuber and gaming influencer. On June 6, 2024, PlayTV premiered the program /Chat at 10 p.m., hosted by Luiz Neves, also known as LG (lgcntw). The show combines interviews and gameplay, drawing inspiration from the iconic program Combo Fala + Joga. It features dynamic interviews with various personalities conducted while playing video games, aiming to attract a diverse and engaged audience. On June 14, 2024, PlayTV launched G.I.B.I.S., a program focused on comic books and pop culture. Hosted by Cris and Gustavo Peter, the show featured interviews with notable figures in the comics industry and explored various comic book stories. It aired weekly on Fridays at 8 PM.

On August 17, 2024, the PlayTV channel began airing the videocast program Estadão Blue Studio Talks, produced by Grupo Estado. The program addresses topics such as challenges, opportunities, and market trends, featuring executives from major corporations. On August 20, 2024, PlayTV premiered Subsolo, a program that explored the behind-the-scenes aspects and stories of rising independent bands in the Brazilian music scene. The show aired every Tuesday at 11 PM. On the same day, the channel also launched Interferência, a music video program created in response to viewer requests. This program retains the original format of the show of the same name that aired in 2012.

On September 13, 2024, PlayTV began airing the dubbed anime series My Deer Friend Nokotan and 2.5 Dimensional Seduction through a partnership with Anime Onegai.

On October 2, 2024, PlayTV announced a partnership with Clip FM 88.7, a radio station located in Indaiatuba, São Paulo. As part of this collaboration, PlayTV secured a segment in Clip FM's morning programming. This segment aired on the show OverClip, which was broadcast from Monday to Friday, between 10:00 AM and 11:00 AM.

On November 26, 2024, Brazilian media reported that PlayTV expanded its distribution through open satellite transmission (TVRO) across Brazil. This expansion increased the channel's accessibility, particularly in areas with limited internet infrastructure.

On December 3, 2024, PlayTV launched the program W7M TV. Airing every Tuesday at 9 PM, the show covers topics related to the gaming and sports universe, as well as other entertainment formats.

On January 13, 2025, PlayTV premiered the South Korean K-drama Love in Her Bag.

On February 9, 2025, PlayTV and Mozu Produções—the production company responsible for the program Antimatéria—ended their partnership, resulting in the program's removal from the channel's lineup. On February 10, 2025, PlayTV announced the revival of the sports program Placar TV, produced in partnership with Placar magazine. The revamped format introduced two new daily segments dedicated to association football: Opinião Placar, focusing on football in São Paulo state, and Placar Aberto, covering football in Rio de Janeiro state. On February 12, 2025, PlayTV launched Kimchi Talks, a program dedicated to South Korean culture. Hosted by Eduarda Duarte, the show airs weekly on Wednesdays at 7 p.m. BRT. On February 18, 2025, PlayTV began airing its programming on the streaming service RedeTV! Go, a platform operated by RedeTV!. On February 20, 2025, PlayTV premiered the program Rik na TV, which focuses on pop culture and gaming. The show is hosted by digital influencer Rik and is broadcast every Thursday at 7:30 PM.

On March 3, 2025, PlayTV Televisão Ltda., the owner and manager of the PlayTV channel, launched PlayTV FAST, a free, advertising-supported streaming television channel. This service operates independently from PlayTV's primary programming. PlayTV FAST initially became available on the 'SóPlay' streaming platform, where it replaced the previous service, PlayTV+ (also known as Play+). According to the company, PlayTV FAST's programming strategy focuses on content popular with younger audiences and current trends within geek culture and entertainment, including genres such as K-pop, Korean dramas (K-dramas), and anime. On March 28, 2025, the channel PlayTV became available on LG smart TVs in Brazil, expanding its digital distribution.

On April 7, 2025, PlayTV premiered the weekly talk show Quase Sério at 7:00 p.m. Hosted by Baptista Miranda, the show features interviews, incorporates unconventional settings, and includes creative challenges for guests.

On May 2, 2025, the PlayTV channel was added to the lineup of the free streaming service TCL Channel. On May 7, 2025, PlayTV premiered the program Spectrum at 7 p.m. The 45-minute show is divided into two segments. The first segment, Zona Neutra, features participants with opposing viewpoints who discuss sensitive topics such as disarmament, abortion, and feminism. The second segment, O Impostor, is a game format in which participants attempt to identify who among them is lying.

On June 18, 2025, PlayTV commenced broadcasting in high definition on Claro TV+, significantly enhancing the viewing experience for subscribers. This upgrade is applicable across all Claro TV+ subscription services, including cable, set-top box, fiber, and IPTV, specifically on channel 622. On June 30, 2025, PlayTV relaunched the program Game Over, which now airs at 8:00 PM. The new iteration is hosted by Thiago Ribas and features the character Estressauro. This season consists of four episodes released monthly, with episodes also available on PlayTV's YouTube channel.

On July 7, 2025, PlayTV premiered the Chinese drama Love and Destiny at 2 p.m., airing from Monday to Friday. The drama originally aired in China in 2019. On July 22, 2025, PlayTV premiered the show Nerd Rank. The program airs at 9 PM and is hosted by Dudu Saad. The program features rankings of popular anime series and includes interactive discussions with viewers. On July 22, 2025, PlayTV announced via social media that the channel was set to launch on the Vivo Play App, a streaming service operated by Vivo, on July 23, 2025. However, the launch did not take place as scheduled. Two days later, on July 25, 2025, PlayTV was officially added to the channel lineup of the Vivo Play App at position 605, becoming accessible through both the app and the service's website. On July 30, 2025, the PlayTV channel was added in HD at position 605 on Vivo's Vivo Play Fibra subscription TV service.

On October 6, 2025, PlayTV announced a revamp of its programming, with the relaunch scheduled for the following week. The change included the reintroduction of the Anime Onegai block, dedicated to airing anime and scheduled for 10:00 PM on Mondays, Wednesdays, and Fridays. At the same time, the channel launched the late-night block Hentai Night, aimed at adult content and airing from 3:00 AM on Wednesdays.

On November 10, 2025, PlayTV began broadcasting UTC – Ultimate Trocadilho Championship, a comedy competition program created by the humor group Castro Brothers. On November 11, 2025, PlayTV added the anime Sonic X to its schedule, airing on Tuesdays and Thursdays at 9 AM, with a repeat at 2 PM. On November 18, 2025, PlayTV launched the programming block "Operação Zenkai – A Batalha dos Geeks". Hosted by Dudu Saad and Marcos Alef, the block airs on Tuesdays and Thursdays at 21:45 and features dubbed anime episodes. The block features content from a partnership with the Japanese studio TMS Entertainment.

On March 11, 2026, PlayTV began airing the MangaQ program, focused on pop culture, games, and anime. On September 3, 2026, PlayTV began airing Magic Bullet Chronicles Ryukendo as part of the Operação Zenkai programming block, on Tuesdays and Thursdays at 9:45 p.m.

== Programming ==
PlayTV targets a young and geek audience, offering a diverse lineup that includes music videos, movie reviews, gameplay shows, Korean drama, reality shows, and anime series. The channel focuses on anime, music, film, pop culture, and gaming, providing entertainment that caters to the interests of its demographic.

=== General programming ===
- Eu Q Mando Twitter – block with music videos selected by Twitter users
- Caliente – block with uncensored music videos
- Cineplay – program based on film backstages
- Combo Fala + Joga – a "mashup" of talk show with video game competitions
- GameTV – news about video games
- Bunka Pop – Japanese pop culture
- Interferência – a selection of music videos of a certain genre
- Ponto Pop 10 – news about pop music including a list of 10 music videos
- Mok – news about video games and technology
- Qu4tro Coisas – pop culture
- PlayHit – media about a game along with music someone requested

=== Anime programming ===
- Bleach (2014–2018)
- Darling in the Franxx (2019–2020)
- Death Note (2014–2015)
- Love Hina (2007–2008)
- Monster Rancher (2008)
- Naruto: Shippuden (2015–2017)
- Ranma ½ (2007–2008)
- Re:Zero − Starting Life in Another World (2019–2020)
- Saint Seiya (2006–2008)
- Samurai Champloo (2007–2008)
- Trigun (2007–2008)
- Yu-Gi-Oh! Duel Monsters (2015–2018)
- Yu Yu Hakusho (2008)
