= Rede Mundial =

Brazilian evangelical television network

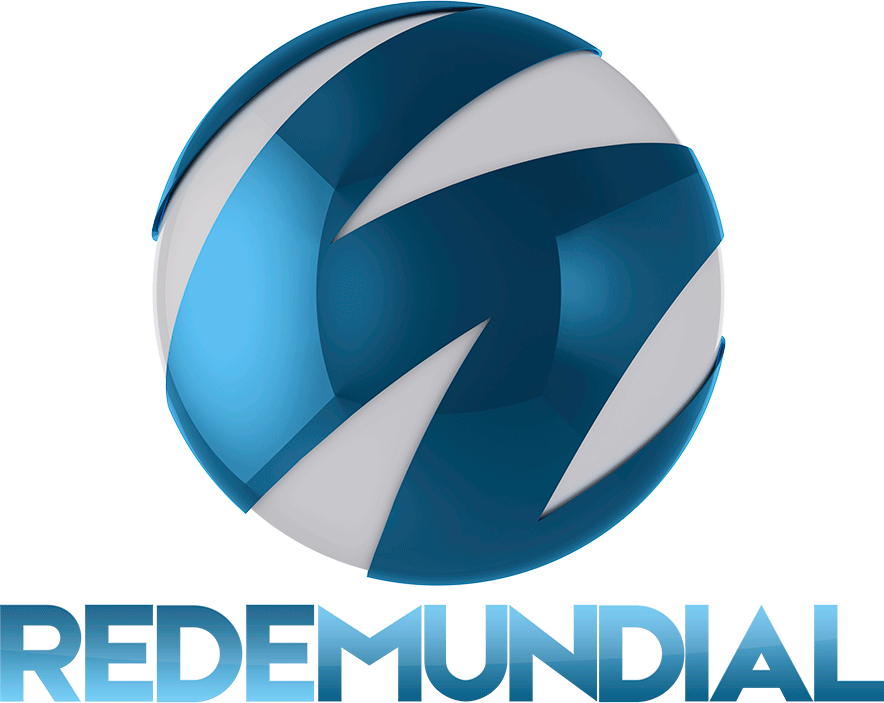
- Type: Free-to-air television network
- Country: Brazil
- Headquarters: São Paulo, Brazil

Programming
- Language: Portuguese
- Picture format: 1080i (HDTV)

Ownership
- Owner: World Church of God's Power
- Parent: Intertevê Serviços Ltda.
- Key people: Valdemiro Santiago de Oliveira (Chairman)

History
- Launched: April 27, 2006
- Founder: Valdemiro Santiago de Oliveira

Links
- Website: www.interteve.com.br

Rede Mundial, also known as TV Mundial is a Brazilian television broadcaster headquartered in the city of São Paulo. The station is operated by Intertevê Serviços Ltda., a company affiliated with the World Church of God's Power, founded by Valdemiro Santiago de Oliveira.

== History ==
The network was founded in 2006 as a cable TV and IPTV. In November 2008 the network launched its studios "Cidade Mundial: A Mão de Deus está Aqui". It consisted of various sets, an area for the host and guests, panels with the Igreja Mundial logo, images of animals, and a replica of a mountain.

On December 11, 2008, Igreja Mundial rented airtime on Band to broadcast programming from Rede Mundial. Its programming was restricted from 2:00 am to 6:00 am. On the same month, Igreja Mundial rented airtime on CNT to broadcast Rede Mundial programming from the period of 5:00 pm to 7:00 pm.

On August 10, 2008, the network started broadcasting via UHF in Metropolitan São Paulo and in satellite via Rede 21. On December 15, leaders of TV Universal managed to get Rede 21 to broadcast religious programming for 22 hours a day.

In 2009 it got its first affiliates in Amazonas, Mato Grosso, Alagoas, and Teresina.

On September 15 TV Alagoas decided to stop broadcasting SBT's signal and to start broadcasting Rede Mundial's signal. This move shocked viewers of the channel and Silvio Santos, owner of SBT, which were not informed of the change. The broadcaster was harshly criticized for its attitude without prior notice and was even accused of transforming the channel into a place for telecults for an evangelical church, disrespecting the Catholic majority of the state's population. The value of the contract was revealed: the church paid the broadcaster R$650,000 reais of the R$1,000,000 reais that the church collects per month from the very few faithful of the church in Alagoas. The broadcaster regretted the agreement and due to delays in paying rent, pressure from viewers and very low audience ratings, it decided to return to broadcasting SBT from May 31, 2010.

In February 2011 the broadcaster started to have a signal in Mato Grosso do Sul through channel 46 UHF, which until then broadcast RedeTV!. Valdemiro did not renew his partnership with Boas Novas Television and since June 30, 2011, Rede Mundial was no longer broadcast in the Northern region of Brazil. In January 2014 Boas Novas Television returned to transmitting the station's signal.

At midnight on June 16, 2012, the broadcaster's signal arrives in Rio de Janeiro through TV Passaponte, which replaced SescTV's signal.

In July 2012 TVCi stopped its partnership with the channel Esporte Interativo and started broadcasting Rede Mundial's signal.

At the end of September he rented an entire channel on NET. the monthly cost of occupying the channel on pay TV costs approximately 500 thousand reais, the same price as Rede 21. Santiago could give up programming on channel 21, but the contract was renewed until 2015.

The leases cost 18 million reais per month, for Igreja Mundial and this all adds up to radio and small TV stations spread across Brazil. Recently the pastor was in debt to Rede Bandeirantes, owner of Rede 21, but he had already paid the debt, placing a property in Santo Amaro as collateral, in addition he sold one of his farms to help pay off the debt he owed.

In November 2013 Rede Mundial loses Rede 21 to its main competitor, the Universal Church of the Kingdom of God of Bishop Edir Macedo. It was alleged that Rede Mundial delayed payment to Grupo Bandeirantes, thereby losing both Rede 21 and the early hours of Rede Bandeirantes.

On December 1, 2013, Rede Mundial opens its signal to the Star One C2 satellite with the new name IMPD TV, on a frequency belonging to RedeTV!. On July 25, 2014, this frequency ceased to be transmitted, and was once again occupied by RedeTV!.

In June 2015 Rede Mundial lost TVCi as one of its affiliates.

In July 2016 the channel ceased to be broadcast by NET due to breach of contract and lack of payment by the church to the operator.

On May 25, 2018, Rede Mundial once again had its analog signal transmitted by the Star One C2 satellite, on a new frequency, where it remained until June 29, 2019.

On November 26, 2021, Rede Mundial took over 22 hours of programming from channel 32 in São Paulo, which was previously occupied by Loading TV. The value of the contract was not revealed.

On April 12, 2026, Rede Mundial began occupying 22 hours a day on the programming of virtual channel 14.1 (physical VHF channel 10) of RBTV in São Paulo; on May 16, the retransmission of Rede Mundial by RBTV was terminated; on May 28, 2026, the retransmission resumed, with the network occupying 22 hours of daily programming once more.
