= José Olímpio Silveira Moraes =

Brazilian politician (born 1956)

José Olímpio
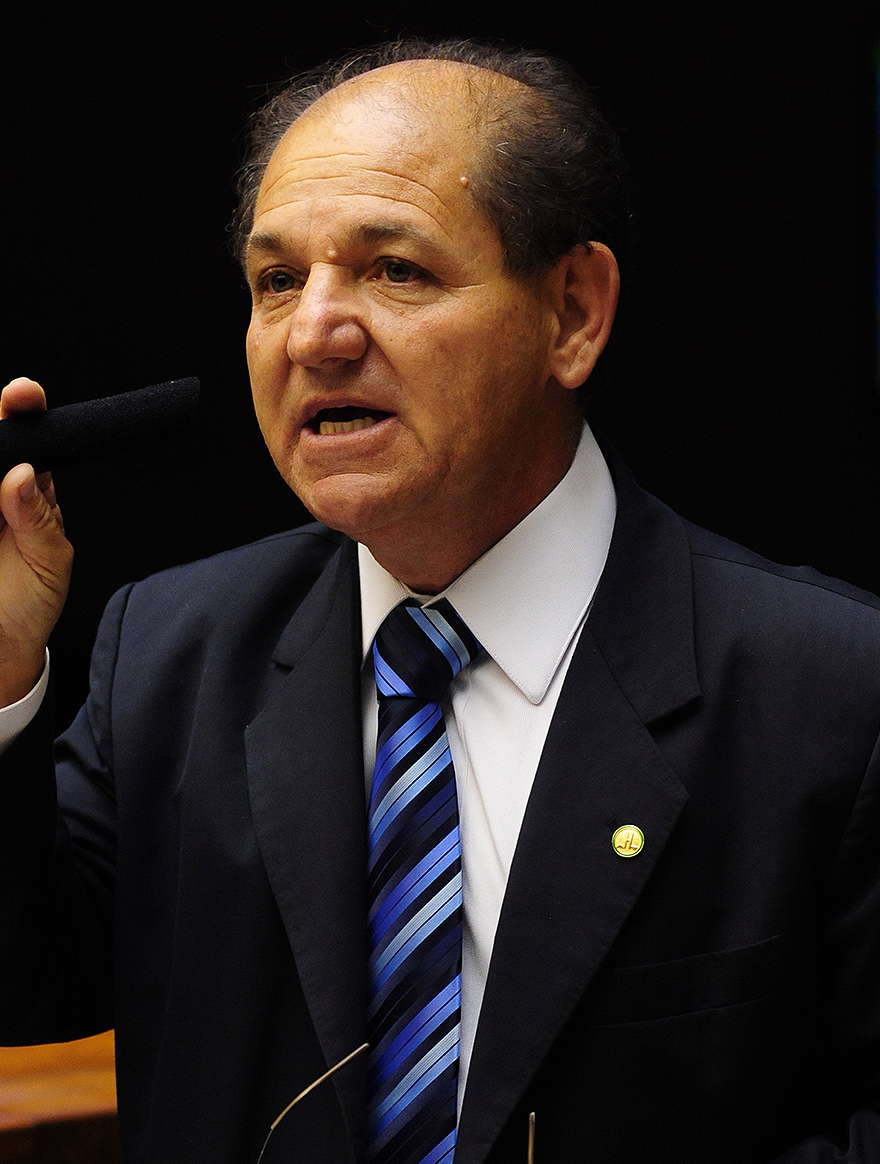
- José Olímpio in April 2013

Federal Deputy for São Paulo
- In office 1 February 2011 – 31 January 2018

Councilor for São Paulo
- In office 1 February 1999 – 31 January 2004

Councilor for São Paulo
- In office 1 January 2009 – 31 January 2011

Councilor of Itu
- In office 1 January 1982 – 31 January 1996

Personal details
- Born: 11 December 1956 (age 69) Itu, São Paulo, Brazil
- Party: DEM

José Olímpio Silveira Moraes (born 11 December 1956) often referred to as José Olimpio or Missionário José Olimpio is a Brazilian politician, businessman, and pastor from São Paulo, having served as city councilmen and state representative. He is also a senior leader of the Igreja Mundial do Poder de Deus.

== Early life ==
José Olímpio was born to a family of modest means and worked as a taxi driver before becoming a businessman. He is a senior leader in the neo-Pentecostal movement the Igreja Mundial do Poder de Deus and is a close friend to its founder Valdemiro Santiago. José Olímpio is often nicknamed Missionário José Olimpio for his frequent proselytism. His son Rodrigo Moraes is also a pastor in the church as well as also being a politician.

== Political career ==
José Olímpio would ultimately vote in favor of the impeachment against then-president Dilma Rousseff. He would later back Rousseff's successor Michel Temer against a similar impeachment motion, and also voted in favor of the Brazil labor reform (2017).

José Olímpio is a popular figure in his home state for his pushing a bill making home ownership easier. Before the bill passed in 2016, he said that it was his prime priority in the chamber of deputies.

José Olímpio was accused of nepotism after helping his son, Rodrigo Moraes, of the PSC also get elected to represent São Paulo in the chamber of deputies in 2010.

José Olímpio was investigated during Operation Car Wash for allegedly taking brides between 2011 and 2014.
