= TV Miramar =

TV Miramar (ZYP 268)
João Pessoa, Paraíba; Brazil
- Channels: Digital: 24 (UHF); Virtual: 4

Programming
- Affiliations: TV Cultura

Ownership
- Owner: Fundação Virginius da Gama e Melo
- Operator: Sistema Arapuan
- Sister stations: Rádio Miramar; TV Arapuan; Rádio Arapuan; Band News FM João Pessoa

History
- First air date: October 20, 1989
- Former names: TVE Paraíba (1989–2006)
- Former affiliations: TVE Brasil (1989-2007); TV Brasil (2007-2011); Rede Mundial (2011-2012)

Links
- Public license information: Profile

TV Miramar is an educational television station based in João Pessoa, Brazil. The station broadcasts on digital channel 24 (UHF) and virtual channel 4 under an affiliation with TV Cultura. Owned by the Fundação Virginius da Gama e Melo, which also oversees radio broadcaster Miramar FM 107.7 (leased to Rádio Deus É Amor), TV Miramar is operated by Sistema Arapuan de Comunicação through a management agreement. Its studios are located at Sistema Arapuan's headquarters in the Tambiá neighborhood of João Pessoa, while its transmission antenna is mounted atop the Edifício Regis in the city's Centro district.

== History ==
On October 20, 1989, the Virgínius da Gama e Melo Foundation, then affiliated with the Federal University of Paraíba (UFPB) and the Paraíba Institutes of Education (Ipê), launched VHF channel 4 as a relay station for the now-defunct TVE Brasil. The station's transmission antenna was installed atop the INSS building in central João Pessoa. Initial plans to convert the relay into a full-fledged broadcaster stalled, leaving the foundation to maintain the relay operation.

Throughout the 1990s, channel 4 faced frequent signal interruptions due to technical maintenance issues and financial instability. By late 1997, the station was deactivated amid a severe institutional crisis at the foundation. A temporary reactivation in 1998 produced poor signal quality, and the station soon went off-air again.

In late 2000, financial difficulties led the foundation to transfer control of its assets—including channel 4 and FM 107.7 MHz—to an evangelical group. The FM station was revived as Rádio Cristã (Christian FM), while channel 4 resumed limited broadcasts in mid-2001.

On November 5, 2002, channel 4 conducted its first local broadcast from the INSS building, featuring pastor Marcelo Fonseca Munguba, pastor Edvan Carneiro da Silva, reporter Ronaldo Ponciano, director Humberto Borges, and cameraman Edson David.

=== Transition to local programming ===
By mid-2003, operating under the trade name TV Miramar, the station began producing local programs such as the crime show De Olho na Cidade, talk programs Ana Ponzi and Display, news segments Câmara Aberta and Fala Sério, and the religious series Êta Glória. Production quality remained rudimentary, relying heavily on improvisation. By late 2003, most local programming ceased, leaving only sporadic video clips and eventually just De Olho na Cidade and Fala Sério on the schedule. In January 2004, all local content was discontinued due to the station's lack of a broadcasting license, reverting exclusively to TVE Brasil's feed.

=== Management shifts and partnerships ===
In mid-2004, the evangelical group entered a management agreement with Sistema Arapuan de Comunicação, transferring oversight of the foundation and its assets. The FM station was renamed Miramar FM.

In February 2005, the foundation partnered with the Prefeitura de João Pessoa to air content from TV Câmara de João Pessoa, upgrading channel 4’s transmitter to improve signal range and quality. TV Câmara's programming initially aired intermittently before settling into fixed time slots. On June 5, 2006, the station officially adopted the name TV Miramar. The partnership ended in May 2009, discontinuing TV Câmara's broadcasts.

By December 2009, TV Miramar's original programming shifted to TV Arapuan, retaining only independent content from the Alex Filho Group alongside TV Brasil's feed. On May 1, 2010, the station began airing TV Brasil's programming exclusively. In October 2011, it switched to Rede Mundial, then fully affiliated with TV Cultura on December 17, 2012.

=== Digital era and relaunch ===
TV Miramar launched its digital signal on November 10, 2017, without local content. On August 17, 2020, the station reintroduced local programming, rebroadcasting Arapuan FM's news shows Paraíba Verdade (6 am–8 am), Arapuan Verdade (12 pm–2 pm), and 60 Minutos (5 pm–7 pm). During special events, such as the 2020 elections, airtimes were extended.

== Technical information ==
Virtual channel	Digital channel	Picture	Content
4.1	24 UHF	1080i	TV Miramar/TV Cultura's main programming

In compliance with federal decrees mandating Brazil's transition from analog to digital television, TV Miramar—alongside other stations in João Pessoa—was required to terminate analog broadcasts on VHF channel 4 by May 30, 2018, per ANATEL's official timetable. However, the station ceased its analog signal 45 days ahead of the deadline, without prior public notice.
