= Loading (TV channel) =

Brazilian broadcast television network

- Type: Over-the-air television network
- Country: Brazil
- First air date: December 3, 2020
- Availability: Brazil and parts of the American continent
- Founded: December 7, 2020 by José Roberto Garcia; Paulo Sérgio Garcia.
- Headquarters: São Paulo, Brazil
- Owner: José Roberto Garcia; Paulo Sérgio Garcia
- Parent: ID TV S.A.
- Key people: Plínio Shiguematsu (Chairman)
- Launch date: December 7, 2020
- Dissolved: November 28, 2021
- Former names: MTV Brasil (1990–2013); Ideal TV (2013–20, except on analog satellite signal)
- Picture format: 1080i (HDTV)
- Claro TV: Channel 11
- Vivo TV: Channel 227 (DTH); Channel 19/27 (cable)
- Oi TV: Channel 20/31
- Sky Brasil: Channel 16
- Callsigns: ZYB 825 (São Paulo)
- Language: Portuguese
- Replaced: Ideal TV (except on analog satellite signal)
- Replaced by: Ideal TV

Loading was a Brazilian television network based in São Paulo, Brazil. It operated on channel 32 (31 UHF digital) under Ideal TV, which is itself under Loading Entertainment Media, a startup owned by the Kalunga group. Launched on December 7, 2020, its programs focused on pop and geek culture, series fiction, movies, animations, and esports. It ended its original production on May 27, 2021, but continued to air reruns and third-party content. The founders are José Roberto Garcia and Paulo Sérgio Garcia.

== History ==
The channel was created by the Kalunga group, led by the owners José Roberto Garcia and Paulo Sérgio Garcia. The Loading project was first announced in October 2020 as a channel with content related to pop, geek, and Asian cultures, among others. Its licenses and physical structure were inherited from MTV Brasil, whose broadcasts ended in 2013 after having been replaced by Ideal TV. Its headquarters are located in the Sumaré neighborhood of São Paulo, which were previously the headquarters of the defunct TV Tupi in the 1970s.

In an interview, Loading CEO Thiago Garcia said the channel would be an entertainment solution for the portion of the Brazilian population that does not have access to content via streaming.

"That is why Loading being on terrestrial TV is a way to democratize access to content that today, mostly, is only possible to be consumed on the internet. It's giving the sense of belonging to people. Belonging to fan communities. The financial condition doesn't matter. Loading will exist for everyone. Without anyone having to pay for it. Free content for everyone."

The channel's website launched at 6 p.m. on December 1, 2020. At the end of a countdown, a video in which a character simulating a hacker, under the pseudonym "Mr. 52X", announced that the channel will open on December 7 at 8:30 p.m. was released with it.

On December 2, the channel announced a partnership with Sony Pictures Entertainment to allow the showing of more than 100 titles, including films, television series and anime. On the same day, it was announced – after an agreement with the Valdemiro Santiago's Rede Mundial – that Ideal TV's signal would continue to be transmitted as analog signals from the Star One C2 and SES-6 satellites.

On December 3 at 6 p.m., a live video of the channel was posted on its website for the public to follow the start of its operations over the internet. At the same time, a list of cities with the network's digital terrestrial signal and the channel numbers on pay-TV was made available. At 7:59 p.m., Ideal TV's terrestrial and subscription TV signals were interrupted by the character "Mr.52x" at the station's switcher, speaking to viewers against the recent directions of entertainment on Brazilian TV and the control of social media algorithms over the public. This was followed by the screening of the first episode of Saint Seiya: The Lost Canvas, with a countdown to the station's launch in the upper right-hand corner. After the episode, a static image inspired by the old Indian-head test pattern appeared with the message "Please stand by" and the Japanese word "invasion" (侵略, shinryaku) in the center of the screen, alternating randomly with short scenes lasting a few seconds that starred "Mr.52x."

On December 4, the channel signed a deal with Crunchyroll for the exclusive broadcast of anime in prime time slots between 6 p.m. and 1 a.m.

On 7 December 2020, Loading launched on free-to-air broadcast in São Paulo, Brazil, via UHF channel 32. The channel began transmissions at 20:30 Brasília time. During its initial broadcast period, Loading aired anime series such as Cardcaptor Sakura, Ranma ½, and Saint Seiya: The Lost Canvas, alongside original programming including Multiverso, MetaGamming, Mais Geek, and Desafio Gamer. The lineup targeted audiences interested in pop culture, gaming, and geek-oriented entertainment. Between December 8, 2020, and January 3, 2021, the Loading channel reportedly reached an audience of 10 million people, while the channel's website recorded 4.7 million page views during the same period, according to data from Brazilian research company IBOPE and Google Analytics.

On February 3, 2021, the Brazilian media startup Loading Entertainment Media announced the expansion of its television channel Loading for nationwide distribution through pay-TV providers. At the time, the channel was already available through operators such as Sky, Claro DTH, and free digital terrestrial television (DTT). The expansion included agreements with telecommunications companies such as Oi (via DTH, IPTV, and Oi Play) and Vivo, facilitated by Stenna Media Brasil. According to industry reports, the channel reached 2.9 million viewers during January 23–24, 2021, an increase attributed in part to its coverage of the Free Fire esports tournament LBFF 2021. Data from the BOOYAH platform indicated over 7.2 million views for its livestream during the same period. Loading CEO Thiago Garcia stated that the expansion aimed to broaden the accessibility of its programming. The Loading channel reached 82.5 million people on open television and 13.4 million on closed television from December 2020 to February 2021 in the largest urban centers and metropolitan regions of the Brazil. On March 20, 2021, the channel exclusively broadcast the final match of the fourth Brazilian Free Fire League (LBFF) championship. During its open television coverage, Loading reached 1.1 million viewers, surpassing the viewership of some open television networks. The event also saw substantial engagement on digital platforms with the March 20 simulcast, recording 66.5 million minutes watched and accumulating 34.1 million total views across various digital channels.

== Controversies ==
=== Dismissal of esports staff ===
On December 11, 2020, less than a week after its debut, Loading went through its first series of internal problems. This led to the dismissal of its entire esports staff, including newsroom journalists and presenters Barbara Gutierrez and Chandy Teixeira, from the Metagaming show. Professionals dismissed from the channel claimed in their social media profiles that the reason would be "editorial misalignment", implying that they would have been subject to censorship. According to an article published by The Esports Observer, the complaints started due to the dissatisfaction of Loading's management team with the content presented in the first two editions of Metagaming. At the December 7 premiere, the show aired an investigative report on a possible fraud scheme related to a fundraising campaign led by a player on Twitch, which they called the "Sparda case". Dissatisfied with the material, the managers warned the show's production that the channel's purpose was to be "a happy place, without controversial subjects". Despite this, the following episode of Metagaming addressed the departure of the Vivo Keyd team from the Brazilian Championship of League of Legends, giving negative press to the developer of the event, Riot Games, due to the announcement of the company Oi, a direct competitor of Vivo, as a new sponsor. This was the last episode of the show that aired.

In reaction to the report, Loading's management dismissed esports editor-in-chief Vicenzzo Mandetta on December 10 and reinforced the channel's "positive agenda," which forbade controversial subjects and reports that denounced and discussed sexism or discrimination in electronic sports. Uncomfortable with the decision, the Metagaming staff complained about censorship and sent a list of demands to the management, requesting freedom of speech and production of their material "with the seriousness the situations required." These demands were rejected. This caused the entire staff of 12 journalists to agree to resign the next day. However, the management of Loading anticipated this decision and dismissed the journalists before they could do so. After this news spread, Loading said in a statement that the Metagaming show would be reformulated "due to the misalignment between Loading's positioning, focused on entertainment, and the show's editorial team" and that they would seek to "deliver content that further enhances Esports, but with an editorial line focused on entertainment".

On the same day, an article published by the website Splash found that Loading had not yet signed a contract with the dismissed journalists and with others who were still at the TV station. The company tried to sign the contracts in a hurry so that the termination would be made official, but the staff refused. Because of this, the journalists had not yet received transportation vouchers, meal vouchers and health insurance. The station justified this by saying that it is a "startup still in its first steps" and that it did not want to "beat partners". Similar statements were also collected in an article from The Esports Observer, which reported internal difficulties with producing material using the old equipment that MTV Brasil relied on. One employee referred to the equipment as "technology from 20 years ago and not relying even on basic software for TV production". The article claims that employees cried before the first Metagaming went live due to the pressure this caused.

In solidarity with the team of journalists, the commentators of the Loading Esports League also announced their resignation. The Metagaming show episode that would be shown on the day was replaced by reruns of Multiverso.
