= Mix TV =

Brazilian music television channel

- Country: Brazil
- Broadcast area: Brazil
- Headquarters: São Paulo, São Paulo

Programming
- Picture format: 480i (SDTV)

Ownership
- Owner: Grupo Objetivo

History
- Launched: 21 January 2005 (21 years ago)
- Replaced: SuperMix (subscription television)
- Closed: 3 November 2014 (terrestrial television); 1 July 2017 (subscription television)
- Replaced by: RBI (terrestrial television)

Links
- Website: www.mixtv.com.br

Mix TV was a Brazilian television music channel aimed at young people. The channel was owned by Grupo Mix de Comunicação, which also owns the Mix FM radio station. Mix TV is run by Fernando di Genio Barbosa and first aired in January 2005.

== History ==
The station began as TV Jovem Pan, founded in 1991, by entrepreneurs Antônio Augusto Amaral de Carvalho, owner of Rádio Jovem Pan and Hamilton Lucas de Oliveira, owner of IBF (Indústria Brasileira de Formulários). Oliveira had previously been involved in the defunct network Manchete.

The station was renamed as Mix TV with the idea that it would be a television version of the Mix FM radio station, which first started in 1995.

In 2009, the station expanded its programming, including new shows like Hip Hop Mix, Hot Clipes, Insight and Banda X Banda.

In the same year, three new VJs began presenting on the channel: Julie, followed by Xis and Max Fivelinha.

== Broadcast television ==
This is a list of the Mix TV affiliates, owned stations, and relays. Bolds are owned-and-operated stations, and italics are affiliates. The others are relay stations. Also is possible watch Mix TV in your website.

Amazonas

- Manaus - Channel 51 UHF

Ceará

- Fortaleza - Channel 50 UHF

Espírito Santo

- Vitória - Channel 44 UHF

Federal District

- Brasília - Channel 17 UHF

Paraná

- Curitiba - Channel 19 UHF

Pernambuco

- Recife - Channel 43 UHF

Rio de Janeiro

- Rio de Janeiro - Channel 16 UHF

Rio Grande do Sul

- Porto Alegre - Channel 40 UHF

Santa Catarina

- Florianópolis - Channel 36 UHF

São Paulo

- Águas de Lindóia - Channel 21 UHF
- Araçatuba - Channel 28 UHF
- Arealva - Channel 15 UHF
- Assis - Channel 41 UHF
- Botucatu - Channel 14 UHF
- Catanduva - Channel 21 UHF
- Fernandópolis - Channel 21 UHF
- Franca - Channel 45 UHF
- General Salgado - Channel 21 UHF
- Ibitinga - Channel 45 UHF
- Presidente Prudente - Channel 14 UHF
- São Paulo - Channel 14 UHF

=== Cable and satellite television ===
- Claro TV - Channel 127
- CTBC TV - Channel 707 (Minas Gerais, Goiás, São Paulo and Mato Grosso do Sul)
- NET - Channel 12 (Santos) and Channel 22 (Brasília)
- Oi TV - Channel 141
- Viamax - Channel 33 (Florianópolis, Joinville and Itajaí)
- Vivo TV (cable) - Channel 12 (São Paulo and Curitiba)
- Vivo TV (satellite) - Channel 234 (São Paulo)

== List of programs broadcast by Mix TV ==
This is a list of programs broadcast by Mix TV, a Brazilian musical television network.

=== Current programming ===
- Clipe e Letra
- Dobradinha
- Doc Mix
- Galeria Mix
- Hip Hop Mix
- Mega Mix
- Mix Cover
- Mix Diário
- Mix Especial
- Mix Nacional
- Mix Nacional: Só Funk
- Não Salvo na Mix
- No Break
- Parada Mix
- Paulo Miklos Show
- Se Vira com Rafa Brites
- Top Nacional
- Trip TV
- Twitada
- Zica

=== Upcoming programming ===
- Álbuns Clássicos
- Banda X Banda
- Baú do Rock

=== Former programming ===
- 1 Minuto (2008-2011)
- AdNews na TV (2011-2012)
- Baú da Mix 80 (2011-2013)
- Baú da Mix 90 (2011-2013)
- Boarding Pass (2008-2011)
- Comando (2011-2013)
- Coming of Age (2012)
- Combo Mix (2005-2006)
- Dose Tripla (2011-2013)
- GameZone (2005-2007)
- Hit Me (2012-2013)
- Hot Clipes (2009-2011)
- Insight (2009-2011)
- Insônia (2009-2012)
- Jam (2011-2012)
- Maré de Som (2012)
- Max Fashion Mix (2009-2011)
- Mix Radical (2010-2011)
- Pegada (2011-2012)
- Pen Drive (2007-2013)
- Piadaria (2011-2013)
- Plantão Mix (2006-2013)
- Play Hit (2005-2006)
- Player 2 (2010-2011)
- Pop Up (2012-2013)
- Repaginada (2012-2013)
- Sex N' Roll (2012-2013)
- Super Mix (2006-2013)
- Top Mix (2005-2013)
- Top Web (2012-2013)
- Viaja Meu Brother (2012)
- Warrior One (2012)

== See also ==
- List of programs broadcast by Mix TV
- MTV Brasil
