= List of Ideal TV affiliates =

This is a list of Xsports affiliates, owned stations, and relays. Bolds are owned and operated stations, and italics are affiliates. The others stations are relay station.

== Brazil ==
=== Alagoas ===
- Maceió - Channel 32 UHF Digital

=== Amazonas ===
- Manaus - Channel 23 UHF Digital

=== Bahia ===
- Salvador - Channel 13 VHF Digital

=== Espírito Santo ===
- Vitória - Channel 28 UHF Digital

=== Federal District ===
- Brasília - Channel 32 UHF Digital

=== Mato Grosso ===
- Cuiabá - Channel 24 UHF Digital

=== Mato Grosso do Sul ===
- Campo Grande - Channel 39 UHF Digital

=== Minas Gerais ===
- Belo Horizonte - Channel 16 UHF Digital
- Conselheiro Lafaiete - Channel 44 UHF
- Contagem - Channel 16 and 29 UHF
- Formiga - Channel 2 VHF
- Juiz de Fora - Channel 18 UHF
- Mateus Leme - Channel 23 UHF
- Uberaba - Channel 54 UHF

=== Pará ===
- Belém - Channel 25 UHF

=== Paraíba ===
- João Pessoa - Channel 32 UHF Digital

=== Paraná ===
- Cascavel - Channel 43 UHF
- Curitiba - Channel 29 UHF
- Londrina - Channel 44 UHF
- Maringá - Channel 25 UHF
- Foz do Iguaçu - Channel 15 UHF
- Tibagi - Channel 39 UHF

=== Pernambuco ===
- Recife - Channel 7 VHF
- Jataúba - Channel 3 VHF

=== Rio de Janeiro ===
- Angra dos Reis - Channel 51 UHF
- Rio de Janeiro - Channel 46 and 48 UHF

=== Rio Grande do Norte ===
- Natal - Channel 25 UHF

=== Rio Grande do Sul ===
- Caxias do Sul - Channel 25 UHF
- Porto Alegre - Channel 14 UHF
- Pelotas - Channel 24 UHF and 43 UHF (digital)
- Santa Maria - Channel 21 UHF

=== Rondônia ===
- Vilhena - Channel 4 VHF

=== São Paulo ===
- Araçatuba - Channel 57 UHF
- Araras - Channel 7 VHF
- Bauru - Channel 29 UHF
- Bebedouro - Channel 11 UHF
- Bariri - Channel 26 UHF
- Botucatu - Channel 46 UHF
- Franca - Channel 41 UHF
- Ilha Solteira - Channel 53 UHF
- Itápolis - Channel 10 VHF
- Itatiba - Channel 42 UHF
- Jaú - Channel 39 UHF
- Matão - Channel 56 UHF
- Patrocínio Paulista - Channel 5 VHF
- Paulínia - Channel 57 UHF
- Piracicaba - Channel 24 UHF
- Presidente Prudente - Channel 58 UHF
- Santos - Channel 56 UHF
- São José do Rio Preto - Channel 15 UHF
- São Manuel - Channel 21 UHF
- São Paulo - Channel 31 UHF digital
- Sorocaba - Channel 10 VHF
- Ribeirão Preto - Channel 55 UHF
- Rio Claro - Channel 57 UHF
