= Cloverway Inc. =

Defunct American entertainment company

- Industry: Multimedia entertainment; Anime licensing and distribution
- Founded: 1991
- Defunct: August 2007
- Fate: Closed
- Headquarters: Long Beach, California, U.S.,
- Area served: North America and Latin America
- Key people: Yasuo Matsuo (President); Mary Jo Winchester (Vice President); Daniel Castaneda (General Manager); Takeshi Okajima (Accountant Manager)
- Products: Anime, Manga, Merchandising
- Owner: Yasuo Matsuo

Cloverway Inc. (abbreviated as CWi, also branded as Cloverway) was a media licensing agency based in Long Beach, California which specialized in Japanese animation and manga licensing, and they were best known for being the representative office of Toei Animation for the Americas, mostly distributing Toei Animation properties for syndication and home video. They were also acting as an intermediary agent between Japanese companies (Shueisha, Shogakukan, Nippon Animation, etc.) and local companies both in the U.S. market (VIZ LLC, Tokyopop, Pioneer Entertainment, ADV Films, and Bandai Entertainment) and the Latin American market (Televisa, TV Azteca, Cisneros Media, Cartoon Network, Fox Kids, PlayTV), for film distribution or manga publishing of their contents in the continent, to various TV channels in each country, regionally and pan-regionally as well as arranging publishing deals with several manga publishers in English, Portuguese and Spanish.

== History ==
The company was founded in 1991. In 1992, the first anime series distributed by Cloverway for Latin America was the Saint Seiya TV series, first broadcast in Mexico and Brazil. It was followed by Sailor Moon and Dragon Ball some time later.

In 1995, Dragon Ball was re-dubbed by Cloverway, after Bandai failed distributing their first episodes and a movie, dubbed under the title of "Zero y el Dragón Mágico" ("Zero and the Magic Dragon", based on the Harmony Gold version).

Generally, Cloverway commissioned dubbing for the Spanish versions to the company Intertrack (until its closure in 2005, later on to Optimedia Productions in 2006) in Mexico, and the Brazilian versions to Álamo (with exceptions like Sailor Moon, Yu Yu Hakusho and Mirmo) in São Paulo Brazil, while some other works were dubbed into Spanish through Cloverway's arrangements with Televisa's owned Audiomaster 3000 in Mexico. Other Cloverway's arrangements were made with International Telefilms Inc. for first-run syndication broadcasting in Chile (ETC TV and CHV) and Spanish dubbing recorded by Technoworks/HispanoAmérica Doblajes in Santiago. As for the series owned by TMS, Spanish versions were already dubbed by VDI Multimedia in Los Angeles and previously distributed by other companies, but Brazilian versions were never produced and Cloverway couldn't get a deal for them to be dubbed and broadcast in Brazil. Also, Spanish versions of Kimba (Tezuka Productions) and Nippon Animation series distributed by Cloverway, were formerly dubbed and licensed by other companies, so Cloverway just distributed and offered them for reruns or inside TV programming packages.

Parallel in the United States, Cloverway tried to distribute the same series by himself as in Latin America, but due to the regulations that led to the series censorship, they delegated licenses to local distributors who managed the production of English localization, dubbing and distribution. However, Sailor Moon S and Sailor Moon SuperS were the only two licenses whose English versions were produced by Cloverway, dubbed in association with Optimum Production Services in Canada. As for the U.S. Hispanic market, Cloverway syndicated the series Tenchi Universe to Univision (Univision and Telefutura networks) and Dragon Ball Z to Telemundo networks.

When Shueisha became a joint owner of VIZ LLC in 2002 and with the subsequent merger with ShoPro Entertainment in 2005, Cloverway eventually lost the representation of Shueisha (for N.A. and L.A.) and Shogakukan (for L.A.) for publishing licensing in the Americas.

The company's representation of Toei Animation in America ceased, due to Toei's decision to start licensing and distributing directly since 2004, thus ending the contracts with their agents Tokyo Business Consultants in Europe and Cloverway in America, and launching their own offices in 2004 (Toei Animation Europe based in Paris and Toei Animation Inc. based in Los Angeles). In 2005, the Toei Animation licenses arranged by Cloverway were transferred to Toei Animation Inc. as a requirement, leaving Cloverway only with the catalog of the other Japanese producers they licensed. As a consequence of this, there has been a chain of irregularities, such as the loss of master tapes of many series formerly distributed by Cloverway, with the Latin American versions being the most affected for this change in distribution.

After losing Toei's successful catalog, Cloverway continued representing and distributing anime from other Japanese companies, adding new properties and selling most of their new catalog to Cartoon Network L.A. and other local TV stations in Brazil and Hispanic America. At the middle of 2006, Cloverway licensed an Anime Free-TV programming block titled "Otacraze" to Brazilian broadcaster PlayTV who begun airing the block in March 2007, including the series Ranma ½, Samurai Champloo, Trigun, and Love Hina.

Due to economic problems, Cloverway closed its operations in August 2007.

== Licensed titles ==
The following list features the anime and live action series licensed by the company:

=== Anime ===
- The Adventures of Tom Sawyer – Distributor
- Ashita no Nadja – Spanish and Brazilian versions producer and Distributor
- Betterman – Distributor
- Bikkuriman – Spanish version producer and Distributor
- Captain Tsubasa J – Spanish version producer and Distributor
- Cardcaptor Sakura – Spanish and Brazilian versions producer and Distributor
  - Cardcaptor Sakura: The Sealed Card – Spanish and Brazilian versions producer and Distributor
- Cooking Master Boy – Distributor (Unreleased)
- Crush Gear Turbo – Distributor (Unreleased)
- Cyber Cat Kurochan – Spanish version producer and Distributor
- Detective Conan – Distributor
- Digimon – Spanish and Brazilian versions producer and Distributor
  - Digimon 02 – Spanish and Brazilian versions producer and Distributor
  - Digimon Tamers – Spanish and Brazilian versions producer and Distributor
  - Digimon Frontier – Spanish and Brazilian versions producer and Distributor
- DNA² – Distributor
- Dr. Slump – Spanish version producer and Distributor
  - New Dr. Slump – Spanish version producer and Distributor
- Dragon Ball – Spanish and Brazilian versions producer and Distributor
  - Dragon Ball Z – Spanish and Brazilian versions producer and Distributor
  - Dragon Ball GT – Spanish and Brazilian versions producer and Distributor
  - Dragon Ball: Curse of the Blood Rubies – Spanish version producer and Distributor
  - Dragon Ball: Sleeping Princess in Devil's Castle – Spanish version producer and Distributor
  - Dragon Ball: Mystical Adventure – Spanish version producer and Distributor
  - Dragon Ball: The Path to Power – Spanish version producer and Distributor
  - Dragon Ball Z: Dead Zone – Spanish version producer and Distributor
  - Dragon Ball Z: The World's Strongest – Spanish version producer and Distributor
  - Dragon Ball Z: The Tree of Might – Spanish version producer, Mexican distribution with Buena Vista International and Distributor
  - Dragon Ball Z: Lord Slug – Spanish version producer and Distributor
  - Dragon Ball Z: Cooler's Revenge – Spanish version producer and Distributor
  - Dragon Ball Z: Return of Cooler – Spanish version producer and Distributor
  - Dragon Ball Z: Super Android 13 – Spanish version producer and Distributor
  - Dragon Ball Z: Broly - The Legendary Super Saiyan – Spanish version producer and Distributor
  - Dragon Ball Z: Bojack Unbound – Spanish version producer and Distributor
  - Dragon Ball GT: A Hero's Legacy – Spanish version producer and Distributor
- Full Metal Panic? Fumoffu – Spanish and Brazilian versions producer and Distributor (Licensed to Animax)
- GeGeGe no Kitaro (1996) – Spanish version producer and Distributor
- Ghost Sweeper Mikami – Spanish version co-producer and Distributor (Dub co-produced by Televisa)
- Gulliver Boy – Spanish version producer and Distributor
- Gundam Wing – Spanish and Brazilian versions producer and Distributor
  - Gundam Wing: Endless Waltz – Spanish and Brazilian versions producer and Distributor
- Gungrave – Spanish and Brazilian versions producer and Distributor
- .hack//SIGN – Distributor (Licensed to Animax)
- Heat Guy J – Spanish and Brazilian versions producer and Distributor
- Kinnikuman (Season 1 only) – Spanish version co-producer and Distributor (Dub co-produced by Telefilms)
- Love Hina – Spanish and Brazilian versions producer and Distributor
- Magic Knight Rayearth – Distributor
- Magical Doremi – Spanish version producer and Distributor
  - Magical Doremi Sharp – Spanish version producer and Distributor
  - Magical Doremi Forte – Distributor (Unreleased)
- Marmalade Boy – Spanish version co-producer and Distributor (Dub co-produced by Telefilms)
- Nube – Spanish version producer and Distributor
- Peter Pan and Wendy – Distributor
- Ranma ½ – Spanish version co-producer and Distributor (Dub co-produced by Televisa)
  - Ranma ½ – Brazilian version producer and Distributor
  - Ranma ½ (First movie) – Spanish version producer and Distributor
  - Ranma ½ (Second movie) – Spanish version producer and Distributor
- Rave Master – Spanish and Brazilian versions producer and Distributor
- Sailor Moon – Spanish and Brazilian versions producer and Distributor
  - Sailor Moon R – Spanish and Brazilian versions producer and Distributor
    - Sailor Moon R: The Movie – Spanish version producer and Distributor
  - Sailor Moon S – English, Spanish and Brazilian versions producer and Distributor
    - Sailor Moon S: The Movie – English and Spanish versions producer and Distributor
  - Sailor Moon SuperS – English, Spanish and Brazilian versions producer and Distributor
    - Sailor Moon SuperS: The Movie – English and Spanish versions producer and Distributor
  - Sailor Moon Sailor Stars – Spanish and Brazilian versions producer and Distributor
- Saint Seiya (Los Caballeros del Zodiaco/Os Cavaleiros do Zodíaco) – Spanish and Brazilian versions producer and Distributor
- Sally the Witch (1989) – Spanish version producer and Distributor
- Samurai Champloo – Spanish and Brazilian versions producer and Distributor
- Slam Dunk – Spanish version producer and Distributor
- The Swiss Family Robinson: Flone of the Mysterious Island – Distributor
- Tenchi Muyo! – Spanish version co-producer and Distributor (Dub co-produced by Telefilms)
  - Tenchi in Tokyo – Spanish version co-producer and Distributor (Dub co-produced by Telefilms)
  - Tenchi Muyo! Mihoshi Special – Spanish version co-producer and Distributor (Dub co-produced by Telefilms)
  - Tenchi Muyo! Ryo-Ohki – Spanish version co-producer and Distributor (Dub co-produced by Telefilms)
  - Tenchi Universe – Spanish version co-producer and Distributor (Dub co-produced by Telefilms)
- Tico and Friends – Distributor
- Trigun – Spanish and Brazilian versions producer and Distributor
- Vandread – Distributor (As well as The Second Stage)
- Virtua Fighter – Distributor
- Yamato Takeru (Maxbot) – Distributor
- Yu Yu Hakusho: Ghost Files – Spanish and Brazilian versions producer and Distributor

=== Japanese tokusatsu ===
- Kamen Rider Kuuga – Spanish version producer and Distributor (only first 25 episodes)
- Ultraman Tiga – Spanish version producer and Distributor

== See also ==
- Adness Entertainment LLC
- Toei Animation Inc.
- Viz Media LLC
