= ManagemenTV =

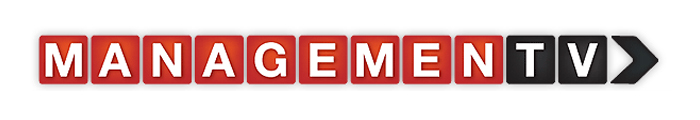
- Country: Argentina; Brazil

Ownership
- Owner: HSM Group

History
- Launched: 2 August 2007; 17 years ago
- Closed: 1 April 2012; 12 years ago

ManagemenTV was a Latin-American television network owned by the HSM Group with programming of analysis and entertainment concerning businesses and management.

== The channel ==
ManagemenTV had 24-hour programming with documentaries, realities, talk shows and series from all over the world related to the business world, the history of brands, entrepreneurs and the economy.

It was launched April 1, 2007 in Argentina as part of Cablevisión Digital and Multicanal Digital. On August 1, 2007 it started airing in Brazil through the digital operator SKY. Since then it has initiated its plans to expand to all of Latin America. As a part of it, on its first birthday it was launched in Mexico.

== The Sections ==
The programming is divided into different sections:

- Markets & Clients: Shows how new ideas are born, why trends are spread and the different consuming habits of each continent.
- Advertising & Marketing: Takes an in-depth look at the mysterious world of this field that moves the economy.
- Leaders: The experiences, the challenges and the secrets of those who accomplish what they set out to do: Richard Branson, Warren Buffett, Bill Gates, Terry Semel, Al Gore and Nicolas Sarkozy.
- Future & Trends: A deep analysis of the trends that are being born today and are still to be named.
- Industries: The reason why different industries exists and the machinery that makes them work.
- Entrepreneurs: The dreamers that continuously change the world with their innovating ideas.
- SMB: Useful advice, success stories and first hand tales of those who dared to realize their own projects.
- Businesses: What defines the successes and the failures of the biggest companies: Coca-Cola, Google, Starbucks, Nike, Cartier, BMW, Chanel, IKEA and Motorola.
- Sports and Management: Stories of sportsmen, teams, professionals and the science behind their performance.

== Programs ==
Some of the programs are:

- Selling Yourself
- The Restaurant
- Buffett & Gates Go Back to School
- Boss Women
- Ad Persuasion
- CEO Exchange
- Wall Street Warriors
- The Office
- Inside Google
- Cirque du Soleil Fire Within
- The Charlie Rose Show
- Airbus vs. Boeing
- Lemonade Stories
- The Secret of your Success
- Ramsay's Kitchen Nightmares
- How to Start Your Own Country
- No Experience Required
- Design: E2
