= Palma, Minas Gerais =

Palma
- Municipality
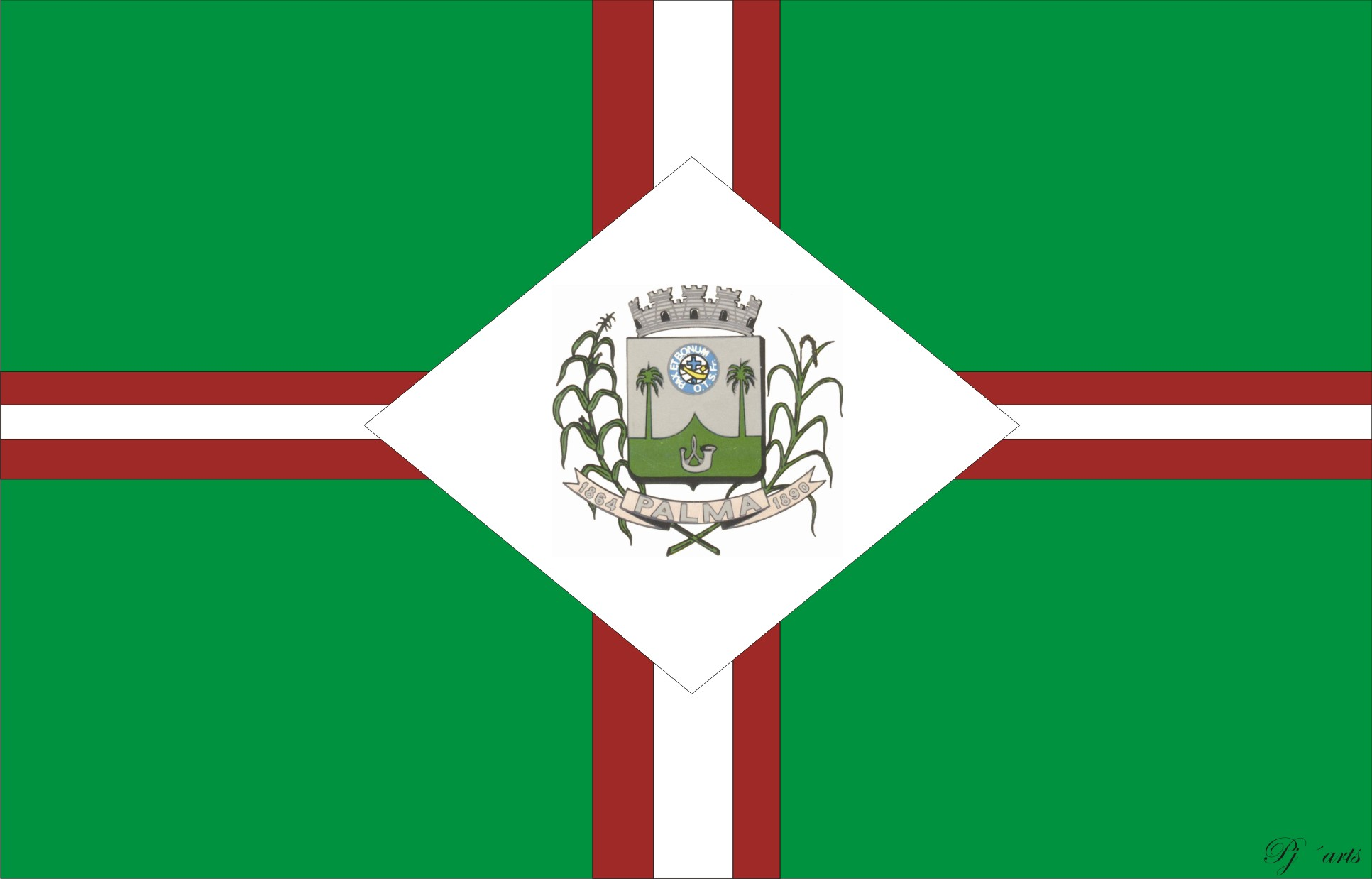
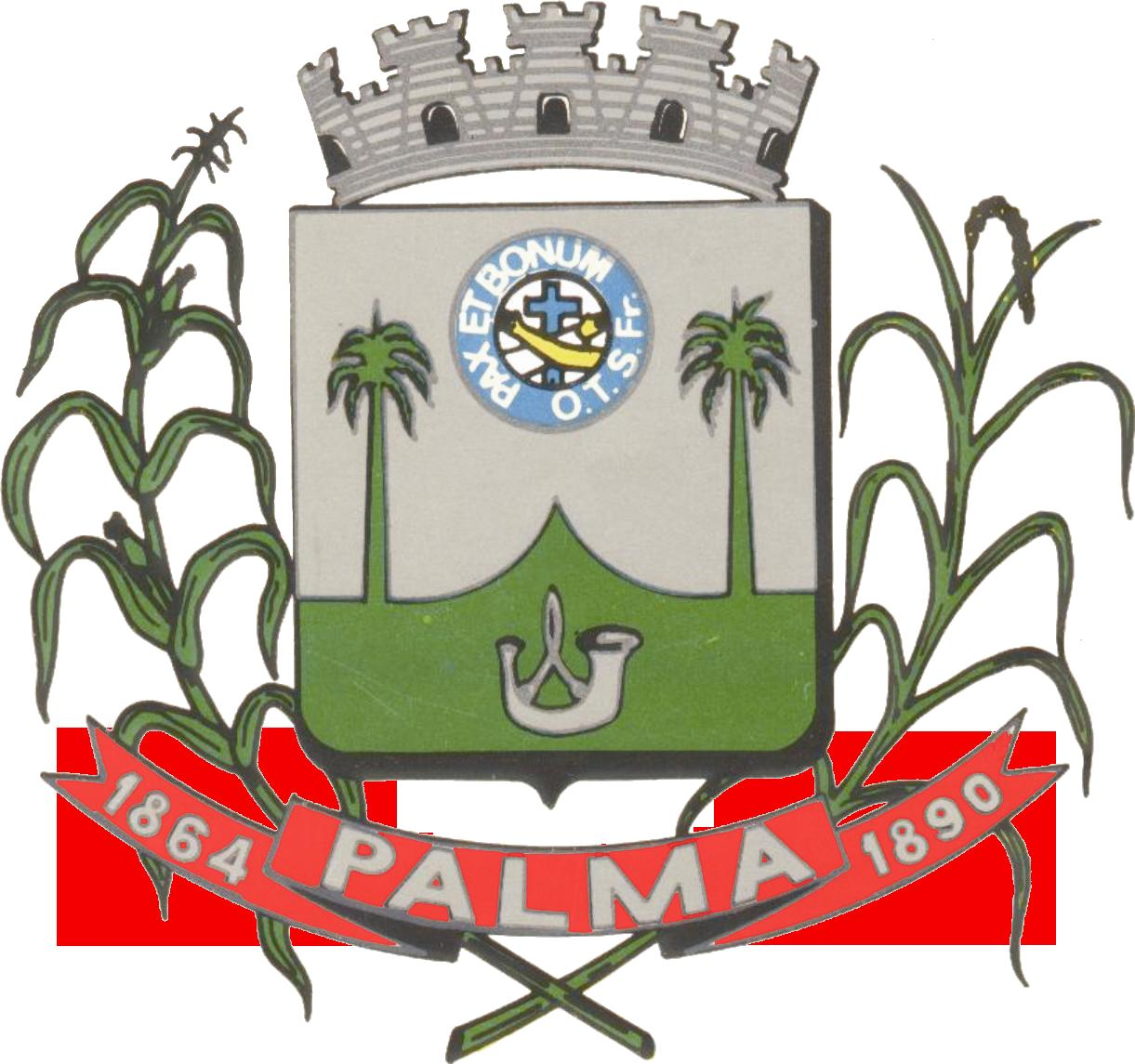
- Flag Coat of arms

- Location in Minas Gerais state

- Location in Brazil
- Coordinates: 21°22′30″S 42°18′51″W
- Country: Brazil
- State: Minas Gerais

Area
  - Total: 316.49 km^{2} (122.20 sq mi)

Population (2020)
  - Total: 6,611
  - Density: 20.89/km^{2} (54.10/sq mi)
- Time zone: UTC−3 (BRT)
- Website: www.palma.mg.gov.br

Palma is a municipality in the southeastern part of the state of Minas Gerais, Brazil. The population is 6,611 (2020 est.) in an area of 316.49 km^{2} (122.20 sq mi). Its elevation is 172 m (564 ft) above sea level.

== Districts ==
- Cisneiros
- Itapiruçu
- Palma

== See also ==
- List of municipalities in Minas Gerais
