= Star One D2 =

Brazilian communications satellite

- Mission type: Communications
- Operator: Embratel
- COSPAR ID: 2021-069A
- SATCAT no.: 49055
- Website: https://www.embratel.com.br/
- Mission duration: 15 years (planned); 3 years, 7 months and 26 days (in progress)

Spacecraft properties
- Spacecraft: Star One D2
- Bus: SSL 1300
- Manufacturer: Maxar Technologies
- Launch mass: 6,190 kg (13,650 lb)
- Power: 19.3 kW

Start of mission
- Launch date: 30 July 2021, 21:00:00 UTC
- Rocket: Ariane 5 ECA (VA 254)
- Launch site: Centre Spatial Guyanais, ELA-3
- Contractor: Arianespace

Orbital parameters
- Reference system: Geocentric orbit
- Regime: Geostationary orbit
- Inclination: 70.0° West

Transponders
- Band: 54 transponders: 28 C-band; 24 Ku-band; 1 Ka-band; 1 X-band
- Coverage area: Brazil, Central America, Latin America

Star One D2, is a Brazilian geostationary communications satellite ordered by Embratel and designed and manufactured by Maxar Technologies on the SSL 1300 satellite bus. It is expected to be stationed on an orbital position at 70.0° West for communications.

== Satellite description ==
Star One D2 is designed and manufactured by Maxar Technologies for Embratel and part of the SSL 1300 satellite bus group for telecommunications. The estimated mass at launch is 6,190 kg (13,650 lb) and expected to last for 15 years. It will also have 4 communication bands (C-, Ku-, Ka- and X-bands).

== Launch ==
The launch time and date was 21:00:00 UTC on 30 July 2021.
