= MTV Brasil =

Former Brazilian television network

- Final logo used from 2012 to 2013
- Type: Over-the-air television network
- Country: Brazil
- Affiliates: See List of MTV Brasil affiliates
- Headquarters: São Paulo, Brazil

Programming
- Language: Portuguese
- Picture format: 480i (4:3 SDTV); 1080i (16:9 HDTV)

Ownership
- Owner: Abril Radiodifusão; Viacom (1996–2005; 2005–2009)
- Parent: Abril Radiodifusão
- Key people: Zico Goes (Director of Programming)
- Sister channels: TV Ideal (2007-2009); FIZ TV (2007-2009); BRZ (2012-2013)

History
- Launched: 20 October 1990
- Founder: Grupo Abril and MTV Networks
- Replaced: TV Abril (1989-1990)
- Closed: 1 April 2012 (Satellite TV); 30 September 2013 (terrestrial television)
- Replaced by: Ideal TV (terrestrial television); MTV (pay television); BRZ (Satellite TV)
- Former names: TV Abril (1989–1990)

MTV Brasil was a Brazilian free-to-air television network owned by Grupo Abril, specializing in youth-oriented entertainment programming. It launched on 20 October 1990 and became the Brazilian iteration of MTV. The channel was notable for being one of the first specialty television networks worldwide to operate via free-to-air broadcasting, rather than cable or satellite television. It was the third MTV channel launched globally and the first to broadcast on terrestrial television.

The network’s headquarters were located on Avenida Professor Alfonso Bovero, in the Sumaré district of São Paulo—a building that had previously housed the headquarters of Rede Tupi. The site was later designated a historical landmark by the Conselho de Defesa do Patrimônio Histórico (Condephaat), becoming the first television facility in the city to receive official heritage status.

By the early 2010s, MTV Brasil was widely regarded as Brazil’s leading youth-oriented television network and one of the country’s largest free-to-air broadcasters. According to the trade publication Meio & Mensagem, it ranked as the fifth most admired television network in Brazil, reflecting its influence and brand recognition rather than audience size.

In June 2013, amid a severe financial crisis affecting both the network and its parent company, Grupo Abril decided to terminate its licensing agreement with Viacom (now Paramount Skydance). MTV Brasil ceased operations on 30 September 2013. The following day, Viacom relaunched MTV as a subscription-based television channel, adopting a different editorial direction from that of the former free-to-air network. On free-to-air television, MTV Brasil was replaced by Ideal TV.

== Background ==
MTV, acronym of Music Television, debuted in the United States on 1 August 1981 under the control of Warner-Amex Satellite Entertainment. Today owned by Viacom, the subscription network revolutionized the music industry worldwide with the popularization of music videos, that were showcased by hosts known as video jockeys, or "VJ's". In Brazil, the company has partnered with the Rede Bandeirantes for the broadcasting of special events, such as awards shows.

The music video itself first came to Brazil through the Rede Globo's weekly news and entertainment show Fantástico. The news magazine was the only TV show to produce and broadcast this type of programming, until the early 1980s, when the independent music video producers wanted to escape the standards imposed by the network. At the same time, MTV appeared in the North American market. Throughout the decade, other programs dedicated to music videos were created, like Clip Trip, on TV Gazeta, Som Pop, on TV Cultura, FMTV and Manchete Clip Show from the defunct Rede Manchete and the Clip Clip, broadcast by Rede Globo.

== History ==
MTV Brasil was launched on 20 October 1990 as 'TV Musicá', only to metropolitan São Paulo, through UHF channel A32 and metropolitan Rio de Janeiro, through VHF channel A9 (with TV Corcovado as an affiliate station). The first video shown was Garota de Ipanema, sung by Marina Lima. In 1996, Viacom acquired 50% of the network, which was, until then, a wholly owned subsidiary of Abril.

MTV Brasil launched on SKY on 19 August 1999 for that year's edition of MTV Video Music Brasil.

In 2005, due to regulatory requirements that non-Brazilian companies can own only up to 30% of a terrestrial network, Abril acquired 20% of MTV Brasil from Viacom.

In September 2006, MTV Brasil launched the broadband channel Overdrive following the international model for the MTV Overdrive. Meanwhile, MTV Brasil announced that it will launch an FM radio station in January 2007 before gradually expanded nationwide.

In early 2007, MTV Brasil stopped airing music videos, being its feature since its launch but was gradually reduced in the mid-2000s.

Logo 2007 used until 2012, and still used in most of the MTV shows' logos

On 2 December 2007, after the official start of commercial HDTV broadcasts in Brazil, MTV launched MTV HD, a simulcast of the main MTV service, featuring original high-definition series and MTV2's $2 Bill concerts. MTV HD is currently available over-the-air in São Paulo. In January 2008, MTV changed its broadcast frequency in Rio de Janeiro from UHF channel 24 to 48. On 1 September 2008 starts transmitting on satellite Star One C2 (70°W South America coverage) by analog system PAL-M, free-to-air frequency 4010H after being encrypted since 1993. This is seen as a response to NET Brasil (a wholly owned subsidiary of Grupo Globo that distributes channels to NET Serviços – and its affiliates – and Sky) dropping MTV from its systems, after disagreeing to MTV conditioning its carriage on cable and satellite to the carriage of Abril owned channels Fiz and Ideal, which, for low viewership (especially since they were never carried by Net or Sky), were closed down in July 2009. MTV remains available on Net cable in markets where it's a must-carry station, for being a full-power broadcast station covering that market.

In December 2009, Abril announced it would purchase Viacom's stake in MTV Brasil and gain exclusive rights to use the MTV brand in Brazil.

MTV Brasil was one of the few MTV channels around the world that didn't air Laguna Beach or any of its spin-offs (such as The Hills), since they were picked up by competitor Multishow.

Grupo Abril did not want to use the new logo, since the logo they used until February 2011 was being used for the MTVBR brand identity; however, since 2010, Viacom had been asking for an update. With many problems, MTV changed the logo in 2012 to avoid further problems with Viacom, since they were in conflict regarding MTV's programming schedule and the reality franchise "Shore". The problem worsened in 2012, with the new logo, which led journalists specializing in media to speculate about the sale of the channel and/or the return of the MTV brand to its worldwide owner, Viacom.

Daniel Castro, from the R7 portal, published on his blog on 13 April 2012 that the then FOX, Valdemiro Santiago and the Portuguese group Ongoing were interested in buying the broadcaster. The following month, the program Comédia MTV ao Vivo showed a clip with a parody of the song Roda Viva, by Chico Buarque. In the clip, the comedians also mock the rumors of the sale of MTV Brasil.

On 15 May 2013, journalist Keila Jimenez published an article in her blog Outro Canal that Grupo Abril was not going to continue to manage the channel until the end of that year, due to the risk of bankruptcy. On 12 June, Kelia posted that Grupo Abril was going to return the brand MTV to Viacom and was going to release a new channel in its place. This was later confirmed by another journalist, Patricia Kogut. A day later, MTV Brasil canceled three TV shows: Acesso MTV, MTV Sem Vergonha and A Hora do Chay and its VJs were fired. A week later, Zico Góes, head of programming on the channel, confirmed that the brand MTV was returned to Viacom and MTV Brasil was going to continue with new TV shows until the end of September.

On 29 July 2013, Viacom International Media Networks announced that the channel would be relaunched on 1 October on pay TV. Grupo Abril announced a goodbye special of the channel from free-to-air television on 30 September. In September, Grupo Abril agreed to sell the entire archive (almost 33 thousand VHS video-tapes) to Viacom. Most of the collection is being selected by Zico Góes, who is scheduled to release a book with the My MTV special shows. The last live TV show of MTV Brasil was held on 26 September, with the VJs and employees of the channel making a party around the former MTV building in Perdizes. It was held from 6pm to midnight (BRT).

The last TV show aired was O Último Programa do Mundo ("The Last Program in the World"). Cuca Lazarotto, who introduced the first music video aired on MTV Brasil, also introduced the last music video, "Maracatu Atômico" by Chico Science & Nação Zumbi. Astrid Fontenelle appeared to give the last message aired by MTV Brasil (which was recorded in the third week of September) and close MTV Brasil's broadcasting. Fontenelle was known for being the first VJ of MTV Brasil's most famous TV show, Disk MTV. As of October, the channel abandoned the name "Brasil", becoming simply MTV.

As part of the activities required to return the brand, the address www.mtv.com.br also stopped working on 30 September being redirected to addresses owned by Viacom.

After handing over the brand to Viacom, Grupo Abril intended to divest itself of its broadcasting network and the transfer of the UHF signal it used to broadcast its channel, as it had no intention of launching a new channel or continuing in the television business. The group intended to continue broadcasting reruns, but also other productions to hold onto the channel's concession while negotiations for the sale of its infrastructure took place. The name was no longer used when the brand was handed over to Viacom, and the channel was renamed Ideal TV, one of Grupo Abril's properties. It has already been reported that Abril has no interest in keeping the channel. One of the reasons was the drop in audience and the internet, bringing losses to the group.

=== Sale of the former TV network ===
On 18 December 2013, in an official statement, Fábio Colletti Barbosa, president of Grupo Abril, announced the sale of the concessions belonging to Abril Radiodifusão to Grupo Spring de Comunicação, which publishes the Brazilian edition of Rolling Stone. This group belongs to José Roberto Maluf, former vice-president of SBT and Band, and current president of TV Cultura. The transaction values were not disclosed, but it is speculated that it is around R$200 million and also supposedly Abril refused a higher value than that coming from the religious R. R. Soares, thus making the future of the new broadcaster in its hands and probably, a secular programming. All of this still has to be approved by the Ministry of Communications and the Administrative Council for Economic Defense (Cade). Despite not having sold the station to Soares, Abril ended up selling spaces on the station to the church of religious leader Valdemiro Santiago, due to the delay in approving the sale process to Spring. The Federal Public Ministry also questioned the sale, which was approved by Cade and the Ministry of Communications.

== Programming ==
=== Disk MTV (1990–2006) ===
Created in 1990, Disk MTV was the Brazilian version of American Dial MTV (precursor of TRL), with the idea of showing the ten most voted music videos of the day via telephone. Initially, the program was hosted by Astrid Fontenelle and, in addition to showing the ten most requested music videos, it aired interviews with artists and bands. Fontenelle left the program in 1994, being replaced by Cuca Lazarotto. Cuca, in turn, was replaced by Sabrina Parlatore in 1996. Parlatore left the program in 2000 when she transferred to Rede Bandeirantes. Disk was temporarily hosted by Chris Nicklas between July and August 2000.

After two months, Sarah Oliveira took over as host of Disk MTV. At the same time as it showed the music charts, the program brought artists to the studio for interviews. Soon, Disk became the main program on MTV Brasil and one of the most watched in its time slot. Oliveira left the program in 2005 to host Jornal da MTV alongside Rafael Losso.

After Oliveira's departure, Disk began to have female hosts who would host the program for a maximum of one year, such as Carla Lamarca, between 2005 and early 2006, the twins Keyla Boaventura & Kênya Boaventura, between March and November, and lastly Luisa Micheletti, between November and December. In 2006, MTV announced that it would focus less on music; this culminated in the end of the program, which caused outrage among the program's fans.

In 2008, MTV Brasil created a new version of Disk MTV, Top 10 MTV, originally hosted by Sophia Reis on Saturdays and aired until 20 December of that year. In 2009, MTV Lab Disk appeared, a section without hosts reserved for the 15 clips most voted by the public. In January 2010, the Top 10 returned to the air and became a daily program, hosted by Vanessa Hadi. The program aired until 1 August 2013.

In February 2014, former MTV Brasil programming director Zico Góes stated in an interview that the voting on the Disk MTV program was manipulated by the network to prevent viewers from getting tired of watching the music videos in the same order every day.

=== Video Music Brazil (1995–2012) ===
In 1995, the first MTV Video Music Awards Brazil was broadcast live from the Memorial da América Latina, the national version of the already renowned US award MTV VMA. Hosted by Marisa Orth, it was originally titled Video Music Awards Brazil. The statuette awarded at the awards ceremony was usually a clip.

In 1996, it was renamed MTV Video Music Brazil, now known as VMB.

In 2007, the awards ceremony underwent a makeover and began to focus less on music videos and more on artists.

The program aired annually until 2012. In 2013, the event was not held due to the return of the MTV brand to Viacom. The new MTV that was evaluating the feasibility of holding the event decided not to hold the awards ceremony in 2014 to prioritize productions such as EMA, VMA and World Stage.

== Marketing ==
At that time, one of the most well-known slogans by MTV Brasil was I want my MTV, which was said by several artists, including the launch of the channel on cable TV. The Brazilian MTV decided not to use this brand in the country, since according to Paulo Ghirotti, from the creative area of DPZ, who developed the brand in the country, it induces the solidarity of a young man locked in a room. Adélia Franceschini, marketing director of TV Abril, said that "[the slogan would have] to be more blasé". In 23 movie theaters located in shopping malls in São Paulo, artists were announced pronouncing the Brazilian slogan, Te vejo na MTV (See you on MTV), and some vignettes from the USA matrix were also included. With an initial revenue goal of US$ 500 thousand per month, its profit began to grow from the end of 1990, when the commercialization of spaces at the station began and when it obtained a revenue of US$ 3 million. According to Meio & Mensagem, the forecast was that in 1991 the channel would yield between US$ 10 and 12 million, which has been achieved.

In the same year, the channel invested US$ 100 thousand in advertising campaigns carried out by DPZ for the public in Rio, which in turn followed the programming through channel 9. Because it is only on the air after noon, the slogan of the campaign was: "After noon, channel 9 looks the way the devil likes it." This motto led a journalist from Jornal do Brasil to say that the motto "promises to displease the Metropolitan Curia of Rio de Janeiro". On another occasion, the same publication compared: "Last year, for much less, a bikini brand had to remove its billboards precisely because of the Curia's demand." The campaign, in turn, was published in newspapers and magazines, as well as billboards and mentions on the radio. It premiered on 15 March 1991. As it is a television network segmented to young audiences, several companies bet on advertising on MTV, such as Banco Bamerindus, Basf, Samello and Warner Lambert, Halls cough drop manufacturer.

In 1997, the station was the main sponsor of one of the biggest football teams in Brazil, Fluminense.

== Controversies ==
Due to its proposal and target audience, MTV Brasil gave its professionals extreme creative and expressive freedom, which led to different controversies during its 23 years of existence.

=== Cartoons ===
In the 1990s, MTV Brasil followed the trend of showing adult-oriented cartoons, such as Beavis and Butt-Head, Daria and, especially, South Park. At the time, the concept of adult animation was not known in Brazil and even cartoons like The Simpsons were seen as childish. The rejection by the public and specialized critics was immediate and such cartoons did not last long on the network's schedule despite their high ratings.

Later, MTV Brasil would revive the concept with the national series Megaliga MTV de VJs Paladinos and Fudêncio e Seus Amigos.

=== Indicative classification ===
Not only in North American MTV animations and productions, the presence of swear words on MTV Brasil was constant at almost any time of day. Several MTV programs were reclassified by the Brazilian Rating System.

In 2007, while ABERT was involved in controversies against the system, MTV Brasil defended it.

=== Ident ===
In 2002, the 12th Civil Court of São Paulo ordered Abril Radiodifusão (now Grupo Spring) to pay R$7.4 million reais for each month in which a vignette was shown where, if paused at each frame, there were photos of women in sexual situations involving sadomasochism.

In 2004, MTV began showing an ident that read: Tédio, falta de criatividade, confusão, burrice, conformismo... desliga a televisão e vá ler um livro! [Boredom, lack of creativity, confusion, stupidity, conformism... turn off the television and go read a book!]. The ident was shown in different versions - the most controversial one stayed on the screen for about 15 minutes with the order of the last sentence.

At the time, it was estimated that 14% of the audience for the vignette turned off the television.

== See also ==
- MTV (Brazilian TV channel) - 2013-25 pay TV channel
- List of programs broadcast by MTV Brasil
- MTV Video Music Brazil
