= TV Universal =

Television network in Brazil

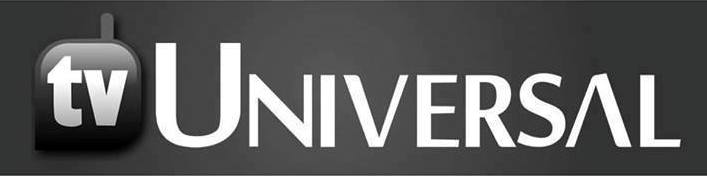
- Type: Broadcast television network
- Country: Brazil
- Availability: National
- Founded: 2011 by Universal Church of the Kingdom of God
- Area: States of São Paulo, Bahia and Piauí in Brazil
- Owner: Universal Church of the Kingdom of God
- Key people: Edir Macedo
- Launch date: July 1, 2011
- Former names: Rede Família; IURD TV
- Official website: http://www.tvuniversal.org/

TV Universal is a Brazilian television channel headquartered in the city of Limeira, state of São Paulo, Brazil. It is a channel belonging to Universal Church of the Kingdom of God (in Portuguese, Igreja Universal do Reino de Deus, IURD) and transmits church services 24 hours a day via Internet and broadcast TV.

== Channels ==
Bahia:

- Salvador: Channel 57 (UHF)

Piauí:

- Teresina: Channel 32 (UHF)

São Paulo:

- Campinas: Channel 8 (VHF)
- Limeira: Channel 11 (VHF)
