= Valdemiro Santiago =

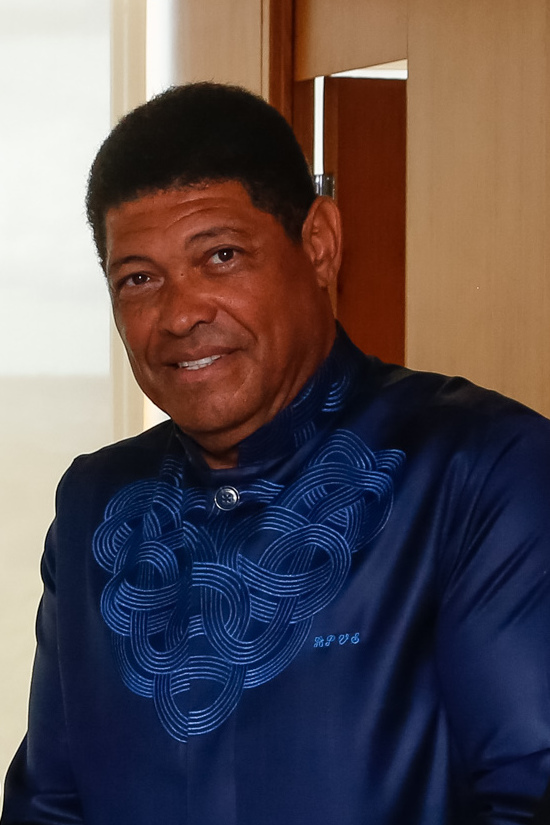
- Born: November 2, 1963 (age 62); Palma, Minas Gerais, Brazil
- Occupations: Evangelical pastor and leader

Valdemiro Santiago (born November 2, 1963) is a Brazilian evangelical pastor and leader of the World Church of God's Power. Graduated from the Order of Evangelical Theologians from Latin America, he has been an evangelical minister for more than 30 years.

Santiago, who was born in Palma, Minas Gerais, was allegedly expelled from the Universal Church of the Kingdom of God (UCKG). Santiago claims he left the church on his own free will, after some misunderstandings with Bishop Edir Macedo, leader of the UCKG.

Santiago founded the World Church of the Power of God soon after he left the UCKG. In a short period of time, the church had temples full of members in all Brazilian States, 10 of them in the Rio de Janeiro state.

According to ISTOÉ magazine Santiago has not had formal education beyond 4th grade, primary school.

According to a publication made on Forbes magazine, his total net worth is estimated at $220 million.

Santiago often evangelizes on online, television, and radio stations. He is considered a preacher of the prosperity gospel.

== Books ==
- O Grande Livramento
- Sê Tú Uma Bênção
