= Vivo TV =

Brazilian pay television provider

Logo of Vivo TV.

Vivo TV is a Brazilian pay television provider, owned by the Spanish telecommunications company Telefónica, through its subsidiary in the country, Vivo. It provides digital cable, satellite and IPTV services.

Grupo Abril's TVA was founded in 1991, available in the cities of São Paulo, Rio de Janeiro, Niterói, Curitiba, Foz do Iguaçu, Porto Alegre, Florianópolis, and Balneário Camboriú. The Spanish telecommunications operator Telefónica gained approval from Brazil's telecommunications regulator to buy Pay-TV assets from Grupo Abril's TVA, and Telefónica TV Digital along with TVA is now Vivo TV.

TVA also provided Cable modem, Broadband Internet access and Wi-Fi connections.
