= World Church of God's Power =

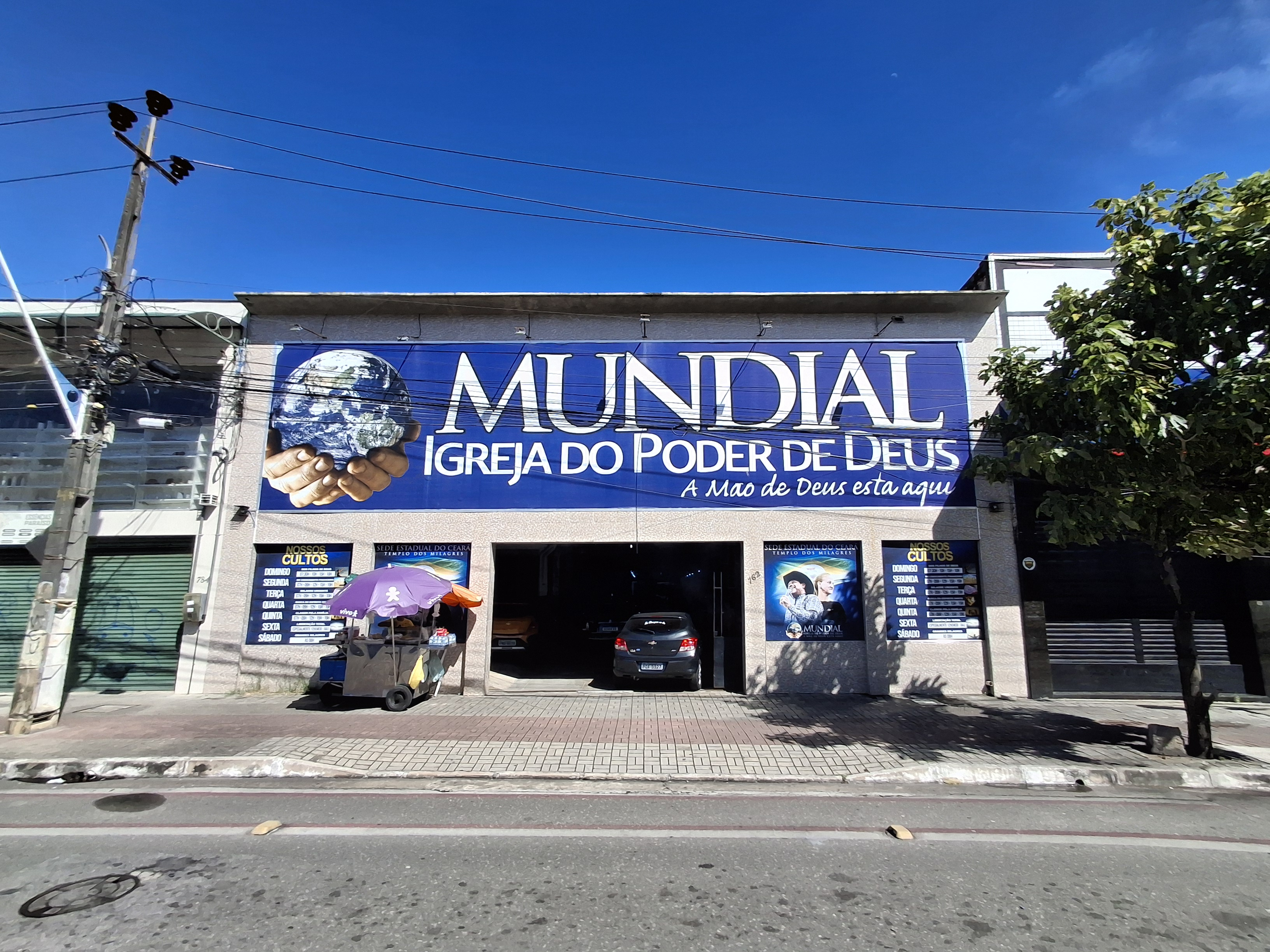
The World Church of God's Power in Fortaleza, Brazil

The World Church of God's Power (Portuguese: Igreja Mundial do Poder de Deus) is a Charismatic Christian denomination founded in Sorocaba, Brazil on March 3, 1998 by Apostle Valdemiro Santiago. The denomination has 6,000 temples in 24 countries.

The headquarter of the World Church of God's Power is located in a temple named "World City" in the Brás neighborhood in São Paulo, alternating the main meetings with the World City of Dreams of God in the Santo Amaro neighborhood, with scattered temples.

As a distinguishing feature of other denominations, the church focuses primarily on faith healing, and miracles, with various testimonies being presented during the church service and the programming of its TV channel, Rede Mundial.
