= List of television stations in Brazil =

This is a list of Brazilian television stations.

== Networks ==
=== Terrestrial ===
- TV Cultura – free–to–air network based in São Paulo, focusing on education and culture
- TV Globo – free–to–air network based in Rio de Janeiro, covering both entertainment, sports and journalism
- RedeTV! – free–to–air entertainment channel based in Osasco
- Record – free–to–air network based in São Paulo
- Record News – free–to–air news network based in São Paulo
- Sistema Brasileiro de Televisão (SBT) – free–to–air network based in Osasco
- Band – free–to–air network based in São Paulo
- TV Brasil – free–to–air public network based in Rio de Janeiro
- Central Nacional de Televisão (CNT) – free–to–air network based in Curitiba
- Xsports – free–to–air sports network based in São Paulo
- TV Jovem Pan – free–to–air network based in São Paulo

=== Satellite and cable ===
- CNN Brasil - satellite and cable news channel
- GloboNews - satellite and cable news channel
- BandNews TV - satellite and cable news channel
- Jovem Pan News - satellite and cable news channel
- SBT News - satellite and cable news channel
- BM&C News - satellite and cable business news channel
- CNN Brasil Money - satellite and cable business news channel
- Times Brasil - satellite and cable business news channel

=== Former ===
- Rede Tupi - was the first television network in South America.
- Rede Manchete
- TV Excelsior

== Stations by states ==
=== Amazonas ===
| Call sign | Television station | City of license | UHF / PSIP | Owner | Transmitter coordinates | ERP | Website |
|---|---|---|---|---|---|---|---|
| ZYB 595 | Amazon Sat | Porto Velho | 23 | Amazônia Cabo Ltda. | —N/a | —N/a | amazonsat.com.br |
| ZYA 248 | Boas Novas Manaus | Manaus | 30 | Fundação Evangélica Boas Novas | —N/a | —N/a | boasnovas.tv |
| ZYA 249 | TV Bandeirantes Amazonas | Manaus | 22 | Rádio e TV Rio Negro Ltda. | —N/a | 10 kW | www.band.com.br/tv/amazonas/ |
| —N/a | Inova TV | Manaus | 47 | Empresa de Radiodifusão Amazônia Ltda. | —N/a | —N/a | twitter.com/RedeTVManaus/ |

=== Bahia ===
| Call sign | Television station | City of license | UHF / PSIP | Owner | Transmitter coordinates | ERP | Website |
|---|---|---|---|---|---|---|---|
| ZYA 295 | Record Bahia | Salvador | 05 | Televisão Itapoan S/A | —N/a | 6 kW | www.band.com.br/tv/bahia/ |
| ZYA 297 | TV Bandeirantes Bahia | Salvador | 07 | Rádio e Televisão Bandeirantes da Bahia Ltda. | —N/a | 6 kW | www.band.com.br/tv/bahia/ |
| ZYA 300 | Record Cabrália | Itabuna | 17 | TV Cabrália Ltda. | 12°59′47.7″S 38°30′22.1″W | 6 kW | noticias.r7.com/bahia/ |
| ZYA 311 | CNT Bahia | Salvador | 08 | Televisão Diamante Ltda. | —N/a | 5 kW | noticias.r7.com/bahia/ |

=== Ceará ===
| Call sign | Television station | City of license | UHF / PSIP | Owner | Transmitter coordinates | ERP | Website |
|---|---|---|---|---|---|---|---|
| ZYA 429 | RedeTV! Fortaleza | Fortaleza | 02 | TV Ômega Ltda. | 03°44′46.8″S 38°30′01.1″W | 9 kW | www.redetv.uol.com.br |

=== Federal District ===
| Call sign | Television station | City of license | UHF / PSIP | Owner | Transmitter coordinates | ERP | Website |
|---|---|---|---|---|---|---|---|
| ZYA 505 | TV Brasil Capital | Brasília | 02 | Empresa Brasil de Comunicação S/A | 15°41′57.3″S 47°49′46.6″W | 2 kW | tvbrasil.ebc.com.br |
| ZYA 507 | Record Brasília | Brasília | 08 | Rádio e Televisão Capital Ltda. | 15°41′57.3″S 47°49′46.6″W | 3 kW | noticias.r7.com/distrito-federal |
| ZYA 508 | TV Globo Brasília | Brasília | 10 | Globo Comunicação e Participações S.A. | 15°41′57.3″S 47°49′46.6″W | 3 kW | redeglobo.globo.com/globobrasilia |
| ZYA 509 | SBT Brasília | Brasília | 24 | First Media | 15°41′57.3″S 47°49′46.6″W | 2 kW | www.sbt.com.br/tv/brasilia |
| ZYA 510 | TV Bandeirantes Brasília | Brasília | 04 | Rádio e Televisão Bandeirantes Ltda. | 15°41′57.3″S 47°49′46.6″W | —N/a | www.band.uol.com.br/tv/brasilia |
| ZYA 516 | TV Câmara | Brasília | 28 | Câmara dos Deputados | —N/a | —N/a | www2.camara.leg.br/camaranoticias |
| ZYA 517 | TV Senado | Brasília | 50 | Senado Federal | —N/a | —N/a | www.senado.leg.br/tv/ |
| ZYA 519 | TV Justiça | Brasília | 50 | Supremo Tribunal Federal | —N/a | —N/a | www.tvjustica.jus.br |

=== Goiás ===
| Call sign | Television station | City of license | UHF / PSIP | Owner | Transmitter coordinates | ERP | Website |
|---|---|---|---|---|---|---|---|
| ZYP 203 | Record Goiás | Goiânia | 04 | Televisão Goyá Ltda. | 16°39′52.6″S 49°20′31.5″W | 20 kW | recordgoais.com.br |

=== Mato Grosso ===
| Call sign | Television station | City of license | UHF / PSIP | Owner | Transmitter coordinates | ERP | Website |
|---|---|---|---|---|---|---|---|
| ZYQ 720 | SBT Cuiabá | Cuiabá | 45(5) | Televisão Rondon Ltda. | —N/a | 2 kW | sbtmt.com.br |
| ZYQ 721 | TV Cidade Verde | Cuiabá | 41(12) | Televisão Cidade Verde S/A | —N/a | —N/a | www.bandmt.com.br |
| ZYQ 722 | TV Vila Real | Cuiabá | 38(10) | Televisão Gazeta Ltda. | —N/a | 10 kW | www.gazetadigital.com.br |

=== Mato Grosso do Sul ===
| Call sign | Television station | City of license | UHF / PSIP | Owner | Transmitter coordinates | ERP | Website |
|---|---|---|---|---|---|---|---|
| ZYP 203 | RBTV | Campo Grande | 24 | Sistema de Comunicação Pantanal S/C Ltda. | —N/a | —N/a | rbtv.com.br |
| ZYA 945 | RIT | Belo Horizonte | 41 | Televisão Cidade Modelo Ltda. | —N/a | 10 kW | www.rittv.com.br |

=== Minas Gerais ===
| Call sign | Television station | City of license | UHF / PSIP | Owner | Transmitter coordinates | ERP | Website |
|---|---|---|---|---|---|---|---|
| ZYA 720 | TV Bandeirantes Minas | Belo Horizonte | 07 | Rádio e Televisão Bandeirantes de Minas Gerais Ltda. | —N/a | —N/a | www.band.uol.com.br/tv/minasgerais/ |
| ZYA 721 | RedeTV! Minas | Prados | 24 | TV Ômega Ltda. | —N/a | 0.01 kW | www.redetv.uol.com.br |
| ZYA 722 | TV Globo Minas | Belo Horizonte | 12 | Globo Comunicação e Participações S/A | 19°58′14.9″S 43°55′46.2″W | 35.5 kW | redeglobo.globo.com/globominas |
| ZYA 726 | TV Bandeirantes Triângulo | Uberaba | 07 | Regional Centro Sul de Comunicações S.A. | 19°44′53.2″S 47°55′08.4″W | —N/a | www.band.uol.com.br/tv/triangulo |
| ZYA 729 | Rede Minas | Belo Horizonte | 09 | Fundação TV Minas | —N/a | —N/a | redeminas.tv |
| ZYA 736 | Record Minas | Belo Horizonte | 02 | Televisão Sociedade Ltda. | 19°58′15.4″S 43°55′47.3″W | 2 kW | recordminas.tv.br |
| —N/a | RBTV Minas | Belo Horizonte | 14 | Sistema de Comunicação Pantanal S/C Ltda. | —N/a | —N/a | rbtv.com.br |

=== Pará ===
| Call sign | Television station | City of license | UHF / PSIP | Owner | Transmitter coordinates | ERP | Website |
|---|---|---|---|---|---|---|---|
| ZYB 200 | SBT Pará | Belém | 26 | TVSBT Canal 5 de Belém S/A | 01°27′24.3″S 48°29′39.6″W | 20 kW | www.sbt.com.br/home/ |
| ZYB 204 | Record Belém | Belém | 22 | Rádio e Televisão Marajoara Ltda. | 01°27′44.9″S 48°29′30.7″W | 19 kW | recordbelem.com.br |

=== Paraná ===
| Call sign | Television station | City of license | UHF / PSIP | Owner | Transmitter coordinates | ERP | Website |
|---|---|---|---|---|---|---|---|
| ZYB 390 | CNT | Curitiba | 43 | Rádio e Televisão OM Ltda. | —N/a | 37 kW | redecnt.com.br |
| ZYB 398 | CNT Londrina | Londrina | 47 | Rádio e Televisão OM Ltda. | —N/a | 5 kW | redecnt.com.br |
| ZYB 400 | TV Bandeirantes Curitiba | Curitiba | 13 | Televisão Bandeirantes do Paraná Ltda. | —N/a | 18 kW | www.band.uol.com.br/tv/curitiba |

=== Pernambuco ===
| Call sign | Television station | City of license | UHF / PSIP | Owner | Transmitter coordinates | ERP | Website |
|---|---|---|---|---|---|---|---|
| ZYB 302 | TV Globo Pernambuco | Recife | 13 | Globo Comunicação e Participações S/A | 08°03′16.1″S 34°52′41.3″W | 10 kW | redeglobo.globo.com/globonordeste |
| ZYB 301 | RedeTV! Recife | Recife | 06 | TV Ômega Ltda. | 07°59′56.2″S 34°52′10.1″W | 9 kW | www.redetv.uol.com.br |

=== Rio de Janeiro ===
| Call sign | Television station | City of license | UHF / PSIP | Owner | Transmitter coordinates | ERP | Website |
|---|---|---|---|---|---|---|---|
| ZYB 510 | TV Brasil | Rio de Janeiro | 02 | Empresa Brasil de Comunicação S/A | 22°57′4.8″S 43°14′10.4″W | 20 kW | tvbrasil.ebc.com.br |
| ZYB 511 | TV Globo Rio | Rio de Janeiro | 04 | Globo Comunicação e Participações S.A. | 22°57′6.2″S 43°14′14.1″W | 40 kW | redeglobo.globo.com |
| ZYB 512 | SBT Rio | Rio de Janeiro | 11 | TVSBT Canal 11 do Rio de Janeiro Ltda. | 22°56′59.4″S 43°13′46.6″W | 42 kW | www.sbt.com.br/tv/rio |
| ZYB 513 | Record Rio | Rio de Janeiro | 13 | Televisão Record do Rio de Janeiro Ltda. | 22°57′2.1″S 43°13′51.5″W | 30 kW | www.recordtvrio.com.br |
| ZYB 514 | TV Bandeirantes Rio de Janeiro | Rio de Janeiro | 07 | Rádio e Televisão Bandeirantes do Rio de Janeiro Ltda. | 22°56′51.0″S 43°13′49.0″W | 4 kW | www.band.uol.com.br/tv/rio |
| ZYB 515 | TV Bandeirantes Rio Interior | Barra Mansa | 08 | Soceidade de Televisão Sul Fluminense Ltda. | —N/a | —N/a | www.band.uol.com.br/tv/riointerior |
| ZYB 516 | Record Interior RJ | Campos | 12 | Rádio Jornal Fluminense de Campos Ltda. | —N/a | —N/a | www.recordhdtv.com.br |
| ZYB 517 | SBT Interior RJ | Nova Friburgo | 03 | TVSBT Canal 3 de Nova Friburgo Ltda. | 22°21′32.9″S 42°33′56.1″W | 0.5 kW | www.sbt.com.br/tv/rio/ |
| ZYB 518 | CNT Rio | Petrópolis | 24 | First Media | Centro | 10 kW | www.redecnt.com.br |
| ZYB 531 | NGT Rio de Janeiro | Rio de Janeiro | 45 | Fundação Veneza de Rádio e TV Educativa | —N/a | —N/a | redengt.com.br |
| ZYB 541 | RedeTV! Rio de Janeiro | Rio de Janeiro | 06 | TV Ômega Ltda. | 22°57′06.2″S 43°14′14.1″W | 15 kW | www.redetv.uol.com.br |
| ZYA 720 | Boas Novas Rio de Janeiro | Rio de Janeiro | 19 | Fundação Evangélica Boas Novas | —N/a | —N/a | boasnovas.tv |

=== Rio Grande do Sul ===
| Call sign | Television station | City of license | UHF / PSIP | Owner | Transmitter coordinates | ERP | Website |
|---|---|---|---|---|---|---|---|
| —N/a | CNT RS | Caxias do Sul | 54 | Televisão Diamante Ltda. | —N/a | 4 kW | redecnt.com.br |
| ZYB 616 | TV Bandeirantes Porto Alegre | Porto Alegre | 32 | Rádio e TV Portovisão Ltda. | —N/a | 25 kW | www.band.uol.com.br/tv/rs |
| ZYB 618 | SBT RS | Porto Alegre | 28 | TVSBT Canal 5 de Porto Alegre S/A | 30°04′54.6″S 51°10′58.1″W | 18.5 kW | www.sbt.com.br/tv/portoalegre |
| ZYB 622 | Record Guaíba | Porto Alegre | 21 | Televisão Guaíba Ltda. | 30°04′54.0″S 51°10′59.6″W | 25 kW | www.recordtvrs.com.br |

=== Santa Catarina ===
| Call sign | Television station | City of license | UHF / PSIP | Owner | Transmitter coordinates | ERP | Website |
|---|---|---|---|---|---|---|---|
| ZYB 761 | Record News SC | Florianópolis | 30 | Televisão Cultura S.A. | 27°35′20.7″S 48°32′1.5″W | 10 kW | ricmais.com.br/sc/record-news |
| ZYB 764 | SBT Santa Catarina | Lages | 46 | TV Lages Ltda. | 27°48′49.1″S 50°22′18.8″W | 2 kW | www.sbt.com.br/tv/sbtsc |

=== São Paulo ===
| Call sign | Television station | City of license | UHF / PSIP | Owner | Transmitter coordinates | ERP | Website |
|---|---|---|---|---|---|---|---|
| ZYB 850 | TV Globo São Paulo | São Paulo | 05 | Globo Comunicação e Participações S.A. | 23°34′4.9″S 46°39′1.5″W | 15 kW | redeglobo.globo.com/sao-paulo |
| ZYB 851 | TV Cultura | São Paulo | 24 | Fundação Padre Anchieta (Centro Paulista de Rádio e TV Educativas) | 23°32′58.2″S 46°40′49.6″W | 15 kW | tvcultura.com.br |
| ZYB 852 | TV Bandeirantes | São Paulo | 13 | Rádio e Televisão Bandeirantes Ltda. | 23°33′20.1″S 46°39′56.0″W | 15 kW | www.band.uol.com.br/tv |
| ZYB 853 | TV Gazeta | São Paulo | 17 | Fundação Cásper Líbero | 23°33′54.9″S 46°39′04.0″W | —N/a | www.tvgazeta.com.br |
| ZYB 854 | Record | São Paulo | 07 | Rádio e Televisão Record S.A. | 23°33′36.6″S 46°39′25.4″W | 15 kW | recordtv.r7.com |
| ZYB 855 | SBT | São Paulo | 04 | TVSBT Canal 4 de São Paulo S/A | 22°57′4.8″S 43°14′10.4″W | 15 kW | www.sbt.com.br/home |
| ZYB 857 | Record Interior SP | Franca | 14 | TV Record de Franca S.A. | 20°30′19.9″S 47°24′07.7″W | 1 kW | recordinteriorsp.com.br |
| ZYB 858 | Record News | Araraquara | 35 | Rede Mulher de Televisão Ltda. | 21°46′50.5″S 48°09′36.8″W | 5 kW | r7.com/recordnews |
| ZYB 861 | Record Rio Preto | S.J. do Rio Preto | 42 | TV Record de Rio Preto S.A. | 20°49′58.9″S 49°21′28.6″W | 10 kW | recordtvriopreto.com.br |
| ZYB 862 | TV Bandeirantes Paulista | Presidente Prudente | 19 | TV Bandeirantes de Presidente Prudente Ltda. | 22°07′30.2″S 51°23′15.2″W | 5 kW | www.band.uol.com.br/tv/paulista |
| ZYB 863 | RedeTV! | São Paulo | 09 | TV Ômega Ltda. | 23°32′36.9″S 46°40′58.4″W | 15 kW | www.redetv.uol.com.br |
| ZYB 864 | SBT Central | Jaú | 24 | TV Studios de Jaú S.A. | —N/a | 4 kW | www.sbt.com.br/home |
| ZYB 867 | SBT RP | Ribeirão Preto | 24 | TV Studios de Ribeirão Preto S.A. | —N/a | 10 kW | www.sbt.com.br/home/ |
| ZYB 872 | Rede Família | Limeira | 44 | Rede Família de Comunicação Ltda. | —N/a | —N/a | www.redefamilia.com.br |
| ZYB 875 | Ideal TV | São Paulo | 32 | Abril Radiodifusão S/A | —N/a | 15 kW | www.grupoabril.com.br |
| ZYB 879 | SBT Interior | Araçatuba | 34 | Sistema Araçá de Comunicação Ltda. | 21°18′12.2″S 50°22′56.5″W | 5 kW | sbtinterior.com |
| ZYB 881 | CNT São Paulo | Americana | 26 | TV Carioba Comunicações Ltda. | —N/a | —N/a | redecnt.com.br |
| ZYB 882 | Record Paulista | Bauru | 27 | TV Record de Bauru Ltda. | —N/a | 1 kW | recordpaulista.com.br |
| ZYB 885 | TV Bandeirantes Vale do Paraíba | Taubaté | 23 | Rádio e Televisão Taubaté Ltda. | —N/a | 25 kW | www.band.uol.com.br/tv/vale |
| ZYB 886 | Redevida | S. J. do Rio Preto | 32 | INBRAC | —N/a | 25 kW | www.redevida.com.br |
| ZYB 888 | Rede 21 | São Paulo | 21 | Rede 21 Comunicações S/A | 23°33′20.1″S 46°39′56.0″W | 15 kW | www.band.uol.com.br |
| ZYB 889 | TV Bandeirantes Campinas | Campinas | 16 | Rádio e TV Bandeirantes de Campinas Ltda. | —N/a | 7 kW | www.band.uol.com.br/campinas |
| ZYB 894 | Record Litoral/Vale | Santos | 33 | TV Mar Ltda. | 23°57′36.9″S 46°21′10.1″W | 1.8 kW | recordtvlitoral.com.br |
| ZYB 895 | NGT | Osasco | 48 | Rede Brasil Total de Serviços Comunicação Ltda. | —N/a | 4.4 kW | redengt.com.br |
| ZYB 898 | Rede Século 21 | Valinhos | 54 | Fundação Século Vinte e Um | —N/a | —N/a | redeseculo21.com.br |
| ZYB 905 | TV Aparecida | Aparecida | 52 | Fundação Nossa Senhora Aparecida | 21°46′50.5″S 48°09′36.8″W | 5 kW | www.a12.com/tv-aparecida |
| —N/a | TV Brasil São Paulo | São Paulo | 62 | Empresa Brasil de Comunicação S/A | —N/a | —N/a | tvbrasil.ebc.com.br |
| —N/a | RBTV São Paulo | São Paulo | 32 | Sistema de Comunicação Pantanal S/C Ltda. | —N/a | 15 kW | rbtv.com.br |

=== Tocantins ===
| Call sign | Television station | City of license | UHF / PSIP | Owner | Transmitter coordinates | ERP | Website |
|---|---|---|---|---|---|---|---|
| —N/a | TV Jovem Palmas | Palmas | 18 | Sistema de Comunicação do Tocantins S/A | —N/a | —N/a | —N/a |
| —N/a | TV Capital | Palmas | 21 | Rio Lontra Rádio e Televisão Ltda. | —N/a | 0.25 kW | www.sbt.to |

== See also ==
- List of Brazil over-the-air television networks
