= List of Brazil over-the-air television networks =

This is a list of Brazil over-the-air television networks, in which it has a listing of over-the-air television networks that operate their stations in Brazil. According to the Brazilian Agency of Telecommunications (Anatel), a television network is “a set of generating stations and their television relay systems with national coverage and convey the same basic programming”, following the decree number 5,371 of Presidency of the Republic.

== List of networks ==
List of TV networks in Brazil
Name	Year est.	Type	City of origin	People reached	List of stations	Owner	Predecessors	Ref.
Amazon Sat	1988	Commercial	Manaus, AM	—N/a	—N/a	Rede Amazônica	—N/a	
Band	1967	Commercial	São Paulo, SP	132,376,578	—N/a	Grupo Bandeirantes	—N/a	
Boa Vontade TV	2000	Educational	São José dos Campos, SP	—N/a	—N/a	Legião da Boa Vontade	—N/a	
Boas Novas	1993	Commercial	Manaus, AM	—N/a	—N/a	Fundação Evangélica Boas Novas	—N/a	
CNT	1979	Commercial	Curitiba, PR	67,657,461	—N/a	Organizações Martinez	CNT Gazeta	
Família	1998	Commercial	Limeira, SP	—N/a	—N/a	Grupo Record	—N/a	
Gênesis	1997	Educational	Brasília, DF	—N/a	—N/a	Sara Nossa Terra	—N/a	
Globo	1965	Commercial	Rio de Janeiro, RJ	100,000,000	—N/a	Grupo Globo	—N/a	
Gospel	1996	Educational	São Paulo, SP	—N/a	—N/a	Igreja Renascer em Cristo	—N/a	
Ideal TV	2013	Commercial	São Paulo, SP	67,278,820	Satellite only	Grupo Spring de Comunicação	MTV Brasil	
Loading	2020	Commercial	São Paulo, SP	—N/a	see list	Grupo Spring de Comunicação	Ideal TV	
Meio Norte	2011	Commercial	Timon, MA	—N/a	—N/a	Sistema Meio Norte	—N/a	
NGT	2003	Educational	São Paulo, SP	—N/a	—N/a	Fundação de Fátima	—N/a	
RBTV	2007	Commercial	Campo Grande, MS	66,587,328	—N/a	Sistema de Comunicação Pantanal	—N/a	
RBI TV	2014	Commercial	Brasília, DF	64,779,342	—N/a	Grupo Objetivo	Mix TV	
Record	1953	Commercial	São Paulo, SP	137,941,879	see list	Grupo Record	—N/a	
Record News	2007	Commercial	Araraquara, SP	76,446,219	—N/a	Grupo Record	Rede Mulher	
Rede 21	1996	Commercial	São Paulo, SP	—N/a	—N/a	Grupo Bandeirantes	—N/a	
RedeTV!	1999	Commercial	São Paulo, SP	90,604,889	see list	Grupo Amilcare Dallevo; Grupo Marcelo de Carvalho	Rede Manchete	
RIT	1999	Commercial	Dourados, MS	69,156,096	—N/a	Igreja da Graça	—N/a	
SBT	1981	Commercial	São Paulo, SP	80,045,856	—N/a	Grupo Silvio Santos	Rede Tupi	
Século 21	1999	Commercial	Valinhos, SP	—N/a	—N/a	Associação do Senhor Jesus	—N/a	
Super	1997	Commercial	Belo Horizonte, MG	—N/a	—N/a	Igreja Batista da Lagoinha	—N/a	
Top TV	2011	Commercial	São Paulo, SP	—N/a	—N/a	Rede Mundial de Comunicações	—N/a	
TV Aparecida	2005	Commercial	Aparecida, SP	70,585,508	—N/a	Rede Aparecida de Comunicação	—N/a	
TV Brasil	2007	Educational	Brasília, DF	—N/a	see list	Empresa Brasil de Comunicação	TVE Brasil	
TV Câmara	1998	Educational	Brasília, DF	—N/a	—N/a	Chamber of Deputies	—N/a	
TV Canção Nova	1989	Educational	Cachoeira Paulista, SP	83,668,225	—N/a	Canção Nova	—N/a	
TV Cultura	1969	Educational	São Paulo, SP	—N/a	—N/a	Fundação Padre Anchieta	—N/a	
TV Diário	1997	Commercial	Fortaleza, CE	—N/a	—N/a	Sistema Verdes Mares	—N/a	
TV Eldorado	2002	Commercial	Santa Inês, MA	—N/a	—N/a	Grupo Estado	—N/a	
TV Gazeta	1970	Commercial	São Paulo, SP	48,701,664	—N/a	Fundação Cásper Líbero	—N/a	
TV Nazaré	2002	Educational	Belém, PA	—N/a	—N/a	Fundação Nazaré de Comunicação	—N/a	
TV Novo Tempo	1996	Educational	Jacareí, SP	—N/a	—N/a	Novo Tempo	—N/a	
TV Senado	1996	Educational	Brasília, DF	—N/a	—N/a	Federal Senate	—N/a	
União	1988	Commercial	Fortaleza, CE	—N/a	—N/a	Rede União de Rádio e Televisão	—N/a	
Redevida	1995	Educational	São José do Rio Preto, SP	112,489,291	—N/a	INBRAC	—N/a	

== See also ==
- List of television stations in Brazil
