= InterTV Grande Minas =

InterTV Grande Minas (ZYA 728)
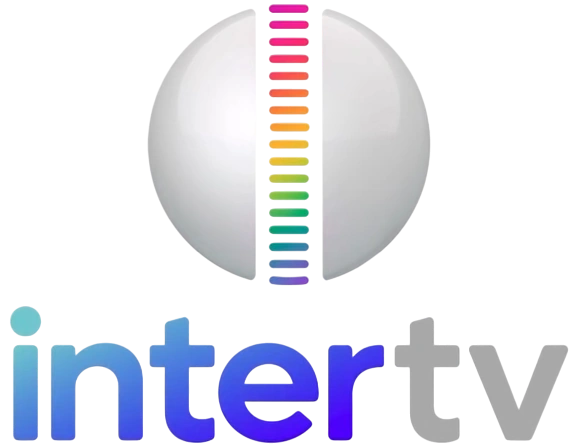
- Montes Claros, Minas Gerais; Brazil
- Channels: Digital: 20; Virtual: 4
- Branding: InterTV

Programming
- Affiliations: TV Globo

Ownership
- Owner: Rede InterTV; (Intervisão Emissoras de Rádio e Televisão Ltda.)

History
- First air date: September 14, 1980
- Former names: TV Montes Claros (1980-1996); TV Grande Minas (1996-2004)
- Former channel numbers: Analog: 4 (VHF, 1980–2018)
- Former affiliations: Rede Bandeirantes (1980–1987)

Technical information
- Licensing authority: ANATEL
- Transmitter coordinates: 19°45′18.8″S 47°54′18.9″W

Links
- Public license information: Profile
- Website: redeglobo.globo.com/mg/intertvmg

InterTV Grande Minas (channel 4) is a Brazilian television station based in Montes Claros, Minas Gerais serving as an affiliate of the TV Globo network for northern Minas Gerais, covering 134 cities in the state.

== History ==
Montes Claros received its first television signals in 1970, when citizens got to see the 1970 FIFA World Cup through microwave relay stations coming from television stations in Belo Horizonte. Since then, the city's mayor Toninho Rebello, fed the dream of setting up a local television station, and for that, formed a company with Elias Siufi, at the time director of Rádio Sociedade (now Super RBV Montes Claros), as well as businessmen Raimundo Tourinho, Geraldo Borges, José Corrêa Machado and João Bosco Martins de Abreu, for a public contest.

On July 20, 1976, president Ernesto Geisel signed the decree granting VHF channel 4 to the company formed by the businessmen, and after four years of preparation, it started on September 14, 1980, as TV Montes Claros, as a Rede Bandeirantes affiliate. The station had state-of-the-art equipment for its time, such as a U-matic editing line, unlike other stations, which were still using film.

In July 1986, TV Montes Claros' minority owners sold their shares to businessman Emanuel Carneiro, owner of Rádio Itatiaia, who started sharing the station's control with Elias Siufi. On June 1, 1987, TV Montes Claros left Rede Bandeirantes and joined Rede Globo, also relaying part of the programming produced by TV Globo Minas in Belo Horizonte. In 1996, a Rede Globo bought Emanuel Carneiro's shares and started controlling 50% of the station, which, on August 7, was renamed TV Grande Minas. At the time, it expanded its signal to the northern, central and north-western regions, as well as Jequitinhonha and Mucuri Valleys, reaching around 170 municipalities, in an area equivalent to 42% of the state of Minas Gerais.

In 2000, Elias Siufi sold his part of the shares, giving TV Grande Minas' control directly to Globo, which besides the station in Belo Horizonte, was also the owner of TV Panorama of Juiz de Fora and half of the shares of Rede Integração, which covered the Triângulo Mineiro region, and EPTV Sul de Minas, based in Varginha. With the exception of the Belo Horizonte station, its shares on all those stations was sold in March 2002, when Globo decided to cover its investments after a billion dollar economic failure at its subsidiary Globo Cabo. In October 2003, TV Grande Minas was sold to Fernando Aboudib Camargo, businessman from the state of Espírito Santo, together with TV Alto Litoral and TV Serra+Mar, located in Rio de Janeiro, forming with both, in February 2004, Rede InterTV, becoming InterTV Grande Minas.

== Technical information ==
Subchannels of InterTV Grande Minas
Virtual	Res.	Content
4.1	1080i	InterTV Grande Minas/Globo's main schedule

InterTV Grande Minas inaugurated its digital signal on June 10, 2014, through UHF channel 20, for Montes Claros and nearby areas. The station invested R$7 million to acquire such equipment. On June 27, 2019, the station started airing its local programs in high definition.

Its analog signal shut down on VHF channel 4 on December 31, 2023, following the official ANATEL roadmap.

== Programming ==
In addition to relaying Globo's national programming, currently InterTV Grande Minas produces and airs the following programs:

- InterTV Notícia: news, with Daniel Cristian;
- MG InterTV 1.ª edição: news, with Pablo Caires;
- MG InterTV 2.ª edição: news, with Laura Nobre;
- InterTV Rural: agribusiness, with Cácio Xavier.

Relayed from TV Globo Minas

- Bom Dia Minas: news, with Liliana Junger, Sérgio Marques and Carlos Eduardo Alvim;
- Globo Esporte MG: sports news, with Maurício Paulucci;
- Terra de Minas: news, presented in rotation scheme;
- Futebol na Globo: soccer matches from Minas Gerais teams.
