= TV Brasil – Canal Integración =

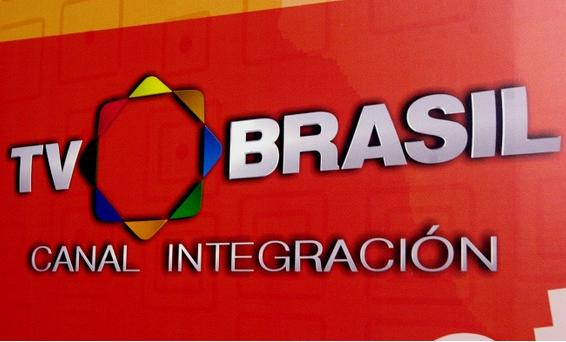
- Country: Brazil
- Broadcast area: Brazil; International
- Headquarters: Brasília

Programming
- Language: Spanish

Ownership
- Owner: Empresa Brasil de Comunicação
- Key people: José Roberto Barbosa Garcez (president)

History
- Launched: January 2005
- Closed: 31 March 2010
- Replaced by: TV Brasil Internacional

TV Brasil – Canal Integración was a television channel created by presidential decree on 27 September 2004 to be Brazil's international public television network. Broadcasting in Spanish from its inception in 2005, it was replaced by TV Brasil Internacional on 1 April 2010.

== History ==
Canal Integración conducted its first test broadcast between 26 and 31 January 2005, for the live telecast of the 2005 World Social Forum, which fathered over 150,000 people from 122 countries in Porto Alegre, RS. A second test was conducted between 9–11 May, to carry the first Latin American-Arab Countries Summit, which was held in Brasília.

Permanent brodacasts began on 30 September 2005, during "Primeira Reunião de Chefes de Estado da Comunidade Sul-Americana de Nações". The channel was in charge of the news coverage of the event, which included the live broadcast of the meetings and the production of interviews and special reports. The second phase of the channel began in 2006 with free distribution of programming throughout South American countries.

During its time of operation, over 430 operators redistributed Canal Integración/Canal Integração's signal, reaching nineteen countries in the Americas by cable or satellite.

TV Brasil – Canal Integración was an initiative of the three chambers of the state, from the legislative, executive and judicial chambers, to work for the creation of international television services. Its administratige and editorial management was controlled by a managing committee, created per decree in 2004, consisting of Empresa Brasileira de Comunicação, Subsecretaria de Comunicação Social (SGPR, of the President of Brazil); Secom), the Ministry of Foreign Affairs, the Federal Senate, the Chamber of Deputies and the Supreme Federal Court. The managing committee had technical and professional support from the TV channels of each of the three chambers, TV Senado, TV Câmara and TV Justiça as well as Empresa Brasil de Comunicação, responsible for its technical and administrative operation.

Canal Integración won the first prize in the National Communication and Justice Prize (Prêmio Nacional de Comunicação e Justiça), in the "Innovation" category, in 2006. The metrics analyzed were pioneerism, originality and quality.

In March 2010, EBC announced that it would launch TV Brasil Internacional as a direct replacement of Canal Integración, focusins solely on Brazilians abroad, unlike the prior channel that focused on South Americans.

== Content ==
Canal Integración produced news with emphasis on South America to provide the right to access to information to South American citizens, presenting an agenda that gave prominence to topics related to citizenship, culture, public policies and foreign relations.
