= Multiplex (television) =

Grouping of program services that are sub-grouped as interleaved data packets

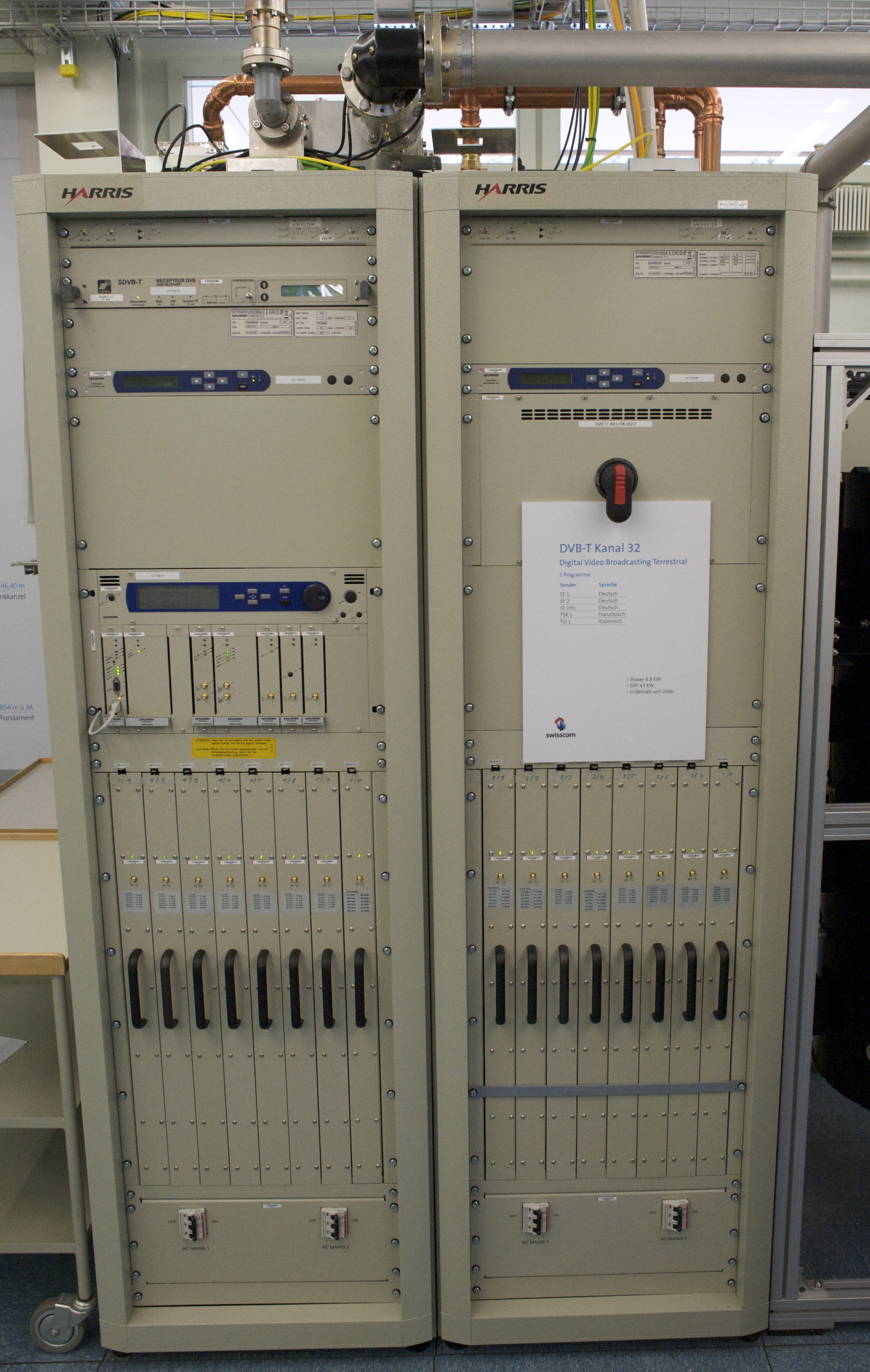
A digital terrestrial television transmitter in Switzerland, broadcasting five TV services on UHF channel 32 (shot 2010; it has since been decommissioned due to the 2019 terrestrial television switch-off).

A multiplex or mux, also known as a bouquet, is a grouping of program services as interleaved data packets for broadcast over a network or modulated multiplexed medium, particularly terrestrial broadcasting. The program services are broadcast as part of one transmission and split out at the receiving end.

The conversion from analog to digital television made it possible to transmit more than one video service, in addition to audio and data, within a fixed space previously used to transmit one analog TV service (varying between six and eight megahertz depending on the system used and bandplan). The capacity of a multiplex depends on several factors, including the video resolution and broadcast quality, compression method, bitrate permitted by the transmission standard, and allocated bandwidth; statistical time-division multiplexing is often used to dynamically allocate bandwidth in accordance with the needs of each individual service. Each service in a multiplex has a separate virtual channel (also known as a logical channel number) for identification and tuning. Depending on the country, a multiplex may be controlled by one broadcaster offering multiple subchannels or may feature services from multiple broadcasters with separate licenses.

Multiplexing has made it possible for many new free-to-air television services to be introduced, some of them expressly designed for carriage as additional channels. In the United States, such services are called digital multicast television networks or diginets. The term is also used in an otherwise unrelated sense to refer to additional channels offered by premium pay television services, such as HBO, similar to its meaning with regard to movie theaters.

== Tuning ==
Depending on the type of transmission system, individual services are either numbered with whole numbers (e.g. 36) or a two-part channel number (e.g. 20.1) consisting of a major and minor channel number.

== New services ==
The digital conversion in countries where broadcasters retained control of their entire multiplex after switchover permitted broadcasters to introduce new supplemental and ancillary services, many of them national in scope. In Australia, Mexico, and the United States, new TV channels were introduced with national coverage.

The licensing of such additional services varies according to national broadcasting regulations. In the United States, a broadcast license covers the full 6 MHz channel and any services broadcast within it. The United Kingdom frequency plan includes three "universal" multiplexes for the national public service broadcasters and three commercial multiplexes broadcast from a total of 80 transmitter sites.

The ISDB-T specification includes 1seg, a mobile media and data broadcasting service utilizing a portion of the spectrum in each multiplex.

== Multiplexing by country ==
=== Australia ===
The first multichannel broadcast in Australia was ABC Kids, which broadcast from 2001 to 2003; in the succeeding years, the country's commercial broadcasters also launched secondary services to compete against DVDs and online piracy. However, their ability to do so was hampered at first by a ban on adding channels, with a focus on such services as datacasting and high-definition. It was not until 2009 that commercial broadcasters were allowed to add multichannels; in that year, the three major networks all did so, bringing the number of channels they offered from three to eleven.

The original commercial multichannels were generalist in nature, which made it difficult for advertisers to target specific demographics and therefore made them less lucrative. The shift to specifically targeted services and their reliance on existing programming has allowed these channels to survive despite drawing comparatively low shares of the audience: in 2018, 7mate led the group with an audience share of 4.1 percent among metropolitan audiences. However, after the Australian Communications and Media Authority permitted the commercial broadcasters to move required children's programming and national drama commitments to their multichannels, ratings and visibility fell precipitously; by 2013, the ABC had more viewers for its children's channels than the commercial broadcasters combined. The commercial broadcasters also became more reliant on news, sport, and reality competitions on their main channels.

Each of the five major broadcasters offers its own suite of multichannels:

- ABC: ABC Kids, ABC Me, ABC News, ABC TV Plus
- SBS: SBS Food, SBS Viceland, SBS World Movies, SBS WorldWatch, National Indigenous Television
- Seven Network: 7Two, 7mate, 7flix, 7Bravo
- Nine Network: 9Go!, 9Gem, 9Life, 9Rush
- Network 10 (owned by Paramount): 10 Bold, 10 Peach, Nickelodeon

=== Brazil ===
In 2009, the Brazilian government ruled that only federally-owned television channels—namely TV Brasil, TV Senado, TV Câmara, TV Justiça, and TV Globo—could offer multiple channels of programming. The decision was made, per an advisor to the Brazilian communications ministry, to prevent the leasing of channels to broadcast infomercials and church services. The effect of the decision was to bar new entrants without their own stations from increasing commercial competition. During the COVID-19 pandemic in Brazil, educational and commercial broadcasters were allowed to introduce subchannels, primarily to carry educational programming, which was extended first to April 2022 and then December 2023.

=== Canada ===
The Canadian Radio-television and Telecommunications Commission (CRTC) requires stations to file licence amendments in order to be considered for permission to carry digital subchannels. On August 17, 2012, the CRTC gave approval to Leamington, Ontario, community station CFTV-TV to broadcast four local subchannels on its digital signal, making it the first station in Canada to launch original content on its multiplex channels.

=== Mexico ===
In 2015, the Federal Telecommunications Institute (IFT) formally authorized broadcasters to apply for permission to add subchannels.

In 2016, the IFT began assigning virtual channels to stations based on their programming, grouping transmitters of the same national network.

=== Spain ===
In 2010, multiplex licensees in Spain were permitted to add two new channels to their services. The Supreme Court of Spain ruled in December 2012 to void this action, stating that the move was illegal as it did not award the channels by way of a public bidding process. As a result, a total of nine channels closed down on May 6, 2014.

=== United States ===
Commercial and non-commercial broadcasters began experimenting with additional subchannels over the course of the 2000s. After the digital television transition in 2009, a new crop of national services, known as digital multicast television networks or diginets, began to emerge, taking advantage of the additional capacity available on many converted stations. Diginets affiliate with individual stations in each market and are generally genre-specific in their programming. Diginets have continued to grow as more advanced encoders enable stations to add additional, income-generating ancillary services. Subchannels have also been used in smaller "short markets" with few full-power stations to provide in-market affiliates of additional major networks; by 2011, Fox had 35 such subchannel affiliates.

Multiplexing is also used in ATSC 3.0 (NextGen TV) rollout plans. To allow multiple stations to begin 3.0 broadcasting without loss of ATSC 1.0 service, one station will typically become a "lighthouse", airing the main channels of several participating stations, while the lighthouse station's channels are broadcast in ATSC 1.0 format on the multiplexes of the other participating stations.

== See also ==
- Digital subchannel
- List of digital television deployments by country
