= InterTV Grandes Minas =

InterTV Grandes Minas (ZYA 728)
- Montes Claros, Minas Gerais, Brazil; Brazil
- Channels: Analog: 4 (VHF); Digital: 20 (UHF); Virtual: 4.1

Programming
- Affiliations: TV Globo

Ownership
- Owner: Rede InterTV; (Intervisão Emissoras de Rádio e Televisão Ltda.)

History
- First air date: September 14, 1980
- Former names: TV Montes Claros (1980-1996); TV Grande Minas (1996-2004)
- Former affiliations: Rede Bandeirantes (1980-1987)

Technical information
- Licensing authority: ANATEL

Links
- Public license information: Profile
- Website: redeglobo.globo.com/mg/intertvmg/

InterTV Grande Minas (channel 4) is a television station licensed to Montes Claros, Minas Gerais, Brazil and affiliated with TV Globo. Owned by Rede InterTV, the station broadcasts in the Northern part of the Noroeste, Central and the Jequitinhonha and Mucuri of Minas Gerais. The presenters of the station's newscasts are Cácio Xavier, Dennis Delano and Selma Goncalves.

== History ==
The municipality of Montes Claros started receiving its first television signals in 1970, when citizens were able to follow the matches of the 1970 FIFA World Cup from microwave relays of television stations from Belo Horizonte. Since then, the city's mayor, Toninho Rebello, nurtured the dream of setting up a local broadcaster, and to this end, he formed a partnership with Elias Siufi, then director of Rádio Sociedade (today Super RBV Montes Claros), as well as businessmen Raimundo Tourinho, Geraldo Borges, José Corrêa Machado and João Bosco Martins de Abreu, for a public competition.

On July 20, 1976 Ernesto Geisel signed the decree granting channel 4 VHF to the company formed by businessmen, and after four years of preparation, TV Montes Claros started on September 16, 1980, having Rede Bandeirantes as its affiliate. The station had cutting-edge equipments for its time, such as a U-matic tape editing line, in contrast with other stations, who still used film.

In July 1986, the minority partners of TV Montes Claros sold their shares to businessman Emanuel Carneiro, owner of Rádio Itatiaia, who began to share control of the station with Elias Siufi. On June 1, 1987, TV Montes Claros left Rede Bandeirantes and became affiliated with Rede Globo, also starting to relay part of the programming produced by TV Globo Minas in Belo Horizonte. In 1996, Rede Globo bought Emanuel Carneiro's share and took 50% of the station's shares, which on August 7 of the same year was renamed TV Grande Minas. At that time, it expanded its signal to the North, Central and Northwest regions, in addition to the Jequitinhonha and Mucuri Valleys, reaching around 170 municipalities, in an area equivalent to 42% of the state of Minas Gerais.

In 2000, Elias Siufi sold his part of the shares, handing over control of TV Grande Minas directly to Globo, which in addition to the Belo Horizonte state, also owned TV Panorama from Juiz de Fora and controlled half of the shares of Rede Integração, which covered the Triângulo Mineiro region in the west of the state, and EPTV Sul de Minas, based in Varginha. With the exception of the network's branch in the capital, its entire stake in these stations was put up for sale in March 2002, when Globo needed to cover a billion-dollar financial hole that occurred after unsuccessful investments in Globo Cabo. In October 2003, TV Grande Minas was sold to Capixaban businessman Fernando Aboudib Camargo, alongside TV Alto Litoral and TV Serra+Mar, in the inland of the state of Rio de Janeiro, forming with both, in February 2004, Rede InterTV, renaming InterTV Grande Minas.

== Journalists ==
Productors

- Cecília Oliveira
- Iran Ferreira
- Leonídia Rodrigues
- Tiago Severino
- Rafael Faria

Reporters

- Denis Delano
- João Edwar
- Cácio Xavier
- Délio Pinheiro
- Natalia Jael
- Ana Carolina Ferreira

Editors

- Larissa Bernardes
- Valéria Almeida
- Cácio Xavier
- João Edwar

Coordinator of Journalism

- Lilian Câmara

Gerent of Journalism

- Cácio Xavier

== Major cities in their coverage area ==
- Montes Claros - Channel 4
- Brasília de Minas - Channel 5
- Januária - Channel 9
- Unaí - Channel 11
- Curvelo - Channel 8
- Turmalina - Channel 13
- Janaúba - Channel 7
- São João da Ponte
- São Francisco - Channel 4
- Pirapora - Channel 44
- Salinas - Channel 4
- Três Marias
- Teófilo Otoni
