= InterTV Planície =

InterTV Planície (ZYB 520)
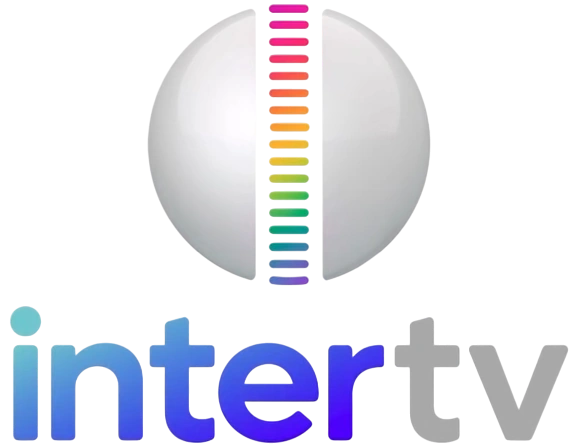
- Campos dos Goytacazes, Rio de Janeiro; Brazil
- Channels: Digital: 36 (UHF); Virtual: 8

Programming
- Affiliations: TV Globo

Ownership
- Owner: Rede InterTV; (TV Planície Ltda.)

History
- Founded: April 4, 1989
- Former names: TV Planície (1989-2004)
- Former channel numbers: Analog: 8 (VHF, 1989-2018)
- Former affiliations: SBT (1989-2004)

Technical information
- Licensing authority: ANATEL

Links
- Public license information: Profile
- Website: redeglobo.globo.com/rj/intertvrj/

InterTV Planície (channel 8) is a television station licensed to Campos dos Goytacazes, Rio de Janeiro, Brazil affiliated to TV Globo. The station is owned by Rede InterTV.

== History ==
The license for VHF channel 8 in Campos dos Goytacazes was granted, after public competition, by president José Sarney on September 21, 1988, to a company formed by Carlos Cardoso Tinoco, Domingos de Almeida Frias and Antônio Leonides Salles. On April 4, 1989, TV Planície started broadcasting, as an SBT affiliate, and the second TV station in the municipality, after TV Norte Fluminense.

In 1996, the station had half of its shares acquired by Grupo Folha de Comunicação, owner of the Folha da Manhã newspaper. At the time, the station inauturated its new facilities at Edifício Ninho das Águias, located in Praça São Salvador, in the city center. In August 2004, the Tinoco family sold its shares at TV Planície to businessman Fernando Aboudib Camargo, owner of the recently-created Rede InterTV, a group of TV Globo-affiliated stations, and in October, it left SBT and became the fourth InterTV station in the state, becoming InterTV Planície in the process.

The affiliation also marked the return of Globo to the region after TV Norte Fluminense left Globo in 1995, in the interim, the network's signal was seen from a relay station of TV Serra+Mar from Nova Friburgo, and from 1997, by a relay of TV Alto Litoral from São Pedro da Aldeia, where InterTV Planície reused its former office in Campos, at Tamandaré Park, becoming an office for its commercial department. In January 2005, it ended its local programming, only relaying programs produced by InterTV Alto Litoral for its coverage area.

On November 5, 2009, InterTV Planície moved its studios and departments to new headquarters at Parque Rodoviário, near BR-101. In October 2011, when it reactivated its local programming, it opened an office in Itaperuna with a reporting team to centralize its news output produced in the state's northwestern region. However, in February 2012, the office closed.

On April 1, 2017, InterTV Planície ceased covering the northwestern region, its relay stations were transferred to InterTV Serra+Mar. With that, besides Campos dos Goytacazes, only São João da Barra, São Francisco de Itabapoana and Quissamã continued to receive its signals.

== Technical information ==
Virtual	Physical	Screen	Content
8.1	36 UHF	1080i	InterTV Alto Litoral/Globo's main schedule

The station started broadcasting its digital signal on UHF channel 36 on November 11, 2011, for Campos dos Goytacazes and region, with an event held at Salão de Festas Parthenon. On March 14, 2016, pit started producing its local programming in high definition.

== Programming ==
When it was an SBT affiliate, it produced TJ Planície (following the TJ Brasil format), as well as producing programs such as Mistura Fina na TV, a youth variety program, presented by Fernandinho Gomes, based on his column at Folha da Manhã, aas well as names such as Júlio Cossolosso and Fábio Abud. After its acquisition by InterTV, it aired Jornal InterTV and RJTV, until they ended in January 2005, being replaced by InterTV Alto Litoral's news output.

Currently, InterTV Planície only produces RJ InterTV 2.ª edição, which premiered on December 22, 2011. Since its beginning, it has been presented by names such as Luiz Gonzaga Neto, Narayanna Borges, Keila Mendes, Fernanda Corrêa, Valéria Vieira, Andresa Alcoforado, Ana Carolini Mota, and, currently, by João Villa Real. The remainder of the schedule consists of rellays of programs from Cabo Frio generated by InterTV Alto Litoral and by Globo's national lineup.

== Relays ==
- São Francisco de Itabapoana - 30 digital UHF
- São João da Barra - 31 digital UHF
