= 2025 in Brazilian television =

This is a list of the Brazilian television related events from 2025.

== Events ==
- 28 April – TV Globo celebrates its 60th anniversary with a grand spectacle in the Barra da Tijuca Arena, in Rio de Janeiro.
- 2 to 3 September – TV Justiça broadcasts the trial of the complaint filed by the Attorney General's Office against former president Jair Bolsonaro and seven other defendants live.
- 5 September – An NFL game between the Kansas City Chiefs and the Los Angeles Charges at the Neo Química Arena in Itaquera, in São Paulo, is broadcast by Sportv. This is the second NFL game in Brazil.
- 9 to 12 September – TV Justiça broadcasts the trial of the complaint against former president Jair Bolsonaro and seven other defendants live.
- 25 September – Mania de Você and Fantástico are nominated for the 2025 International Emmy Awards.
- 2 October – Estúdios Globo turns 30 years, when the "Walk of Fame" is inaugurated, a space dedicated to honoring TV veterans.
- 7 October – Thainá Gonçalves wins the second season of the reality show Estrela da Casa.
- 20 October – The telenovela Três Graças, which is written by Aguinaldo Silva, premieres on TV Globo and replaces the remake of Vale Tudo.
- 28 October – Brazilian television stations in the Metropolitan Region of Rio de Janeiro, including TV Globo, Record, SBT, and Band, cover the major operation by the police against the Comando Vermelho in the city of the same name with the first two suspending a large part of their national afternoon programming. In the case of TV Globo, a friendly football match between the Brazilian women's national football team and Italy is not broadcast to viewers in Rio de Janeiro.
- 30 and 31 October – The new anchors of the news programs Hora Um da Notícia, Jornal Hoje, and Jornal Nacional mark the beginning of the new phase announced by TV Globo.
- 31 October – William Bonner bids farewell to Jornal Nacional from TV Globo, ending a 29-year career at the program's news desk. The journalist leaves the post as the longest-serving anchor in the history of the newscast.
- 3 November – César Tralli begins presenting the Jornal Nacional alongside Renata Vasconcellos, replacing William Bonner.
- 22 November – TV Globo's news program shows live coverage of the preventive arrest of former president Jair Bolsonaro, who violated his ankle monitor and intended to flee.
- 24 November – The president of Grupo Globo, João Roberto Marinho, wins the World Television Personality award at the 2025 International Emmy Awards, in New York (USA). This is the fourth time that TV Globo has received this International Emmy Award.
- 9 December – Reporters are removed by the Chamber's Legislative Police and prevented from recording events in the Chamber's Plenary. Journalists are assaulted by the Legislative Police. Congressman Glauber Braga is forcibly removed from the plenary by the police after occuping the presiding table of the Chamber of Deputies and refusing to leave the space. TV Câmara cuts the signal of the plenary transmission.
- 31 December – MTV ends the channels dedicated to showing 24-hour music videos. The channels MTV Music, MTV 80s, MTV 90s, Club MTV and MTV Live stop being broadcast in nine countries, including Brazil.

== Deaths ==
- 6 October - David José, actor who played the character Pedrinho in the first version of "Sítio do Picapau Amarelo"
- 24 November - Ione Borges, aged 73, former presenter who became famous for hosting the women's program "Mulheres" alongside Claudete Troiano in the 1980s and 1990s

== See also ==
- 2025 in Brazil
