= Rede InterTV =

Brazilian regional television network

InterTV
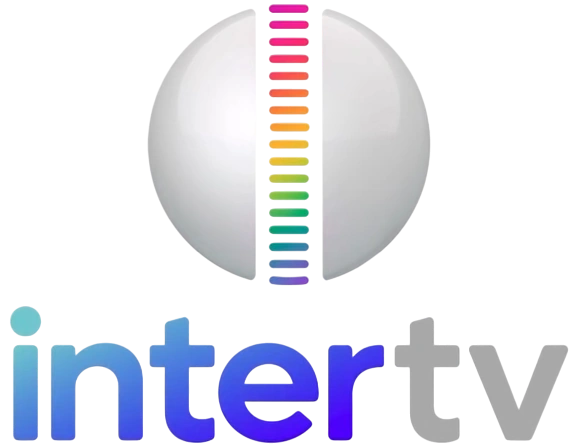
- Country: Brazil
- Network: TV Globo
- Headquarters: Norte and Serra Fluminense, Região Dos Lagos, North and East of Minas Gerais and Rio Grande do Norte

Ownership
- Owner: Grupo Incopsal

History
- Launched: February 2004

The Rede InterTV (InterTV Network) is a network of television stations affiliated with the Brazilian network, TV Globo. It operates in three states of Brazil, Rio de Janeiro, Minas Gerais and Rio Grande do Norte, reaching 505 municipalities and 11 million viewers.

== History ==
In 2003, TV stations TV Alto Litoral in Cabo Frio, TV Serra+Mar in Nova Friburgo and TV Grande Minas in Montes Claros joined together to form the Rede InterTV. Before that, the stations were "independent", i.e. not formed a regional network.

In 2004, InterTV bought TV Planície of Campos dos Goytacazes, which had an affiliation to SBT.

In 2005, TV Cabugi in Natal joined the Rede InterTV.

In 2008, TV Dos Vales of Coronel Fabriciano, Minas Gerais joined the network.

In 2009, InterTV launched its website.

In 2012 local versions G1 and Globoesporte.com for InterTV TV stations were launched.

== Stations ==
- Rio de Janeiro
  - InterTV Serra+Mar is based in Nova Friburgo, broadcasting to 19 cities in the mountainous region of the state, some important cities covered by InterTV Serra+Mar are Petrópolis and Teresópolis.
  - InterTV Alto Litoral based in Cabo Frio, transmits to the municipalities of Região dos Lagos (Maricá, Saquarema, Araruama, Rio Bonito, Silva Jardim, São Pedro da Aldeia, Iguaba Grande, Armação dos Búzios and Arraial do Cabo) and the Norte Fluminense (Conceição de Macabu, Casimiro de Abreu, Rio das Ostras, Macaé and Quissamã).
  - InterTV Planície is based on Campos dos Goytacazes, covering 16 municipalities in the North-West of the state as São Francisco de Itabapoana, São Fidélis, São João da Barra and Itaperuna.
- Minas Gerais
  - InterTV Grande Minas based in Montes Claros, covers the North of Minas Gerais.
  - InterTV Dos Vales is based in Coronel Fabriciano, covers the East and North of Minas Gerais.
- Rio Grande do Norte
  - InterTV Cabugi is based in Natal, covers the east, and parts of the South and Central Rio Grande do Norte.
  - InterTV Costa Branca is based in Mossoró, covers the West and Central Rio Grande do Norte.
