= União =

União is the Portuguese word for Union. It may refer to:

- the Brazilian federal government
- União do Vegetal, a church known for its usage of Hoasca as tea
- Brazilian frigate União (F45), a general-purpose Niterói class frigate launched 1975 and completed 1980
- Rede União, a television network in Fortaleza, Ceará, Brazil

Cities

- União, Guinea-Bissau

Places in Brazil

- União dos Palmares, a city in the state of Alagoas
- União da Vitória, a city in the state of Paraná
- União, Piauí, a town in the state of Piauí

Football (soccer) clubs

- C.F. União, a.k.a. União Madeira, Portuguese football club that plays in the Madeira Islands
- União Agrícola Barbarense Futebol Clube, Brazilian football club
- União São João Esporte Clube, Brazilian football club
- União Bandeirante Futebol Clube, Brazilian football club
- União Esporte Clube, Brazilian football club
- União Futebol Clube, Brazilian football club
- Sociedade Esportiva União Cacoalense, Brazilian football club
- União de São Lourenço, Cape Verdean football club
- C.D. União Micaelense, Portuguese football club
- União Esportiva, Brazilian football club
- União Recreativa dos Trabalhadores, Brazilian football club
- União Recreativo Social Olímpico, Brazilian football club
- União de Marechal Hermes Futebol Clube, Brazilian football club
- União Central Futebol Clube, Brazilian football club
- União Frederiquense de Futebol, Brazilian football club
- Esporte Clube União Suzano, Brazilian football club
- União Suzano Atlético Clube, Brazilian football club
