= Rádio Senado =

- Type: Broadcast radio network
- Country: Brazil
- Headquarters: Brasília, Federal District

Programming
- Language(s): Portuguese
- Format: Public broadcasting; music; adult contemporary; MPB

Ownership
- Owner: Senado Federal
- Operator: Brazilian Senate
- Sister stations: TV Senado

History
- Founded: January 29, 1997 by José Sarney

Links
- Website: www12.senado.leg.br/radio

Rádio Senado is a Brazilian radio network based in Brasília, maintained by the Federal Senate's Social Communication Secretariat, alongside Agência Senado and TV Senado. It is a public broadcasting vehicle, broadcasting Senate sessions as well as cultural and social programs, in addition to musical programming with an emphasis on MPB. The station began broadcasting on January 29, 1997, operating only in Brasília, and from the 2010s onwards, it began to expand its signal to several capitals, through new retransmissions or partner radio stations.

== History ==
In 1996, by decision of the then President of the Senate José Sarney, a commission was set up to develop a project to set up a radio station, initially an FM station. On January 29, 1997, the Subsecretaria de Rádio Senado was created, with the priority objective of broadcasting the audio of committee meetings and plenary sessions of the Federal Senate and the National Congress. The new station was also responsible for broadcasting the Senate's other activities, including the actions of the Presidency and senators.

In addition to FM broadcasts, from 1999 until the beginning of 2012, Rádio Senado also broadcast on shortwave radio, through a partnership contract with Empresa Brasil de Comunicação (EBC). This programming was especially aimed at the North and Northeast regions of Brazil, as well as the state of Mato Grosso and the north of Goiás, with differentiated, lighter language, in a didactic and popular format, with the aim of communicating more effectively with the target audience.

In November 2017, with the structuring of the Radioagência service, the broadcaster began to seek a closer relationship with partner stations in all states of the country. In addition to all the journalistic and cultural material produced by Radio, the partner stations began to receive institutional material and personalized vignettes that highlight the partnership with Rádio Senado.

== Stations ==
Rádio Senado is present in Brasília and 15 other state capitals and their metropolitan regions (Cuiabá, Rio Branco, Macapá, Manaus, Belém, Boa Vista, Teresina, São Luís, Fortaleza, Maceió, João Pessoa, Natal, Aracaju, Rio de Janeiro and Porto Velho). The stations outside Brasília operate under agreements with local legislatures, cultural and educational foundations and universities, which provide the physical structure and maintenance of the spaces, while the Senate provides the transmitters.
