= InterTV Costa Branca =

InterTV Costa Branca (ZYP 298)
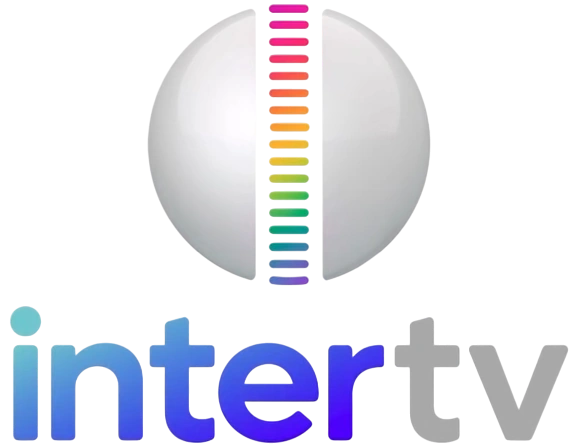
- Mossoró, Rio Grande do Norte; Brazil
- Channels: Digital: 47 (UHF); Virtual: 18
- Branding: InterTV

Programming
- Affiliations: TV Globo

Ownership
- Owner: Rede InterTV (50%) Sistema Tribuna de Comunicação (50%); (Televisão Costa Branca Ltda.)

History
- Founded: 2011
- First air date: March 27, 2015
- Former channel numbers: Analog: 18 (UHF, 2015–2019)

Technical information
- Licensing authority: ANATEL
- ERP: 0.3 kW
- Transmitter coordinates: 5°12′26.2″S 37°19′31.7″W

Links
- Public license information: Profile
- Website: redeglobo.globo.com/rn/intertvrn

InterTV Costa Branca (channel 18) is a Brazilian television station based in Mossoró, Rio Grande do Norte that is affiliated with TV Globo. The station is owned by Sistema Tribuna de Comunicação, owned by businessman and politician Henrique Eduardo Alves, who controls half of the shares with Rede InterTV, a company of the Grupo Incospal, owned by businessman Fernando Aboudib Camargo.

== History ==
=== Background ===
Before the emergence of the first TV generators in Rio Grande do Norte, the city of Mossoró already had experience with TVs in 1973, when under the administration of then mayor Dix-Huit Rosado, it inaugurated microwave relay stations, the first of which being TV Verdes Mares from Fortaleza (at the time, it was not yet affiliated with Globo, which it became in 1974), inaugurated on January 31, 1970, by journalist Edson Queiroz.

At the time, TV Verdes Mares began expanding transmission to cities in the interior of Ceará, including those in other states, such as the cities of Parnaíba (in the north of Piauí) and Mossoró itself (in the west of Rio Grande do Norte).

In 1977, another relay was inaugurated, TV Rádio Clube de Pernambuco (TV Tupi in Recife). With this, the city now had two TV channels dividing the audience dispute.

In 1980, with the end of the Rede Tupi stations, Natal and part of the state were left with only two TV channels: Universitária and the relay of the Recife Globo station. In Mossoró, only TV Verdes Mares remained.

In September 1987, weeks after TV Cabugi (affiliated with Globo) was inaugurated, the TV Verdes Mares channel present in Mossoró for 14 years ceased to be broadcast, both in the city and in Rio Grande do Norte, and began to retransmit TV Cabugi and Verdes Mares began to operate only in Ceará.

During the 90s at the end of the 20th century until the mid-2000s at the beginning of the 21st century, the city of Mossoró began to have new network retransmitters (SBT, Bandeirantes, Manchete, CNT, Record, Vida, RedeTV!, TVE Brasil), until most of them were replaced by retransmitters from Natal and other states.

=== 2009: Announcement of the license ===
In 2009, the Ministry of Communications announced the opening of competition No. 67/2009 for the first commercial TV station generator in the interior of the State, to be operated on UHF channel 18 in the city. Rede InterTV took part in the bidding against 19 interested media companies. Each company participating in this competition delivered three envelopes: documentation, project and value. The minimum quota to participate in the TV generator bidding is R$1 million. At the time of the competition request, digital signal transmission was not included, as it was only present in the capitals of Brazilian states.

On December 7, 2011, the Ministry of Communications (MC) announced that the winning company was Rede InterTV in a very fierce bidding process, when presenting the "largest proposal" for acquiring the channel, with a bid of R$17 million.

The president of InterTV Cabugi, Aluízio Alves Neto, in an interview with Tribuna do Norte, said: "The announcement of the winner was made last Wednesday. Now, we are in the period for the other competitors to present a request for challenge. I believe that this will not happen and the five-day deadline will be met" and that after this time, the then head of the Ministry of Communications, Paulo Bernardo Silva, will ratify the result and the president Dilma Rousseff signs the process.

The station's first name was announced by Aluízio Alves Neto and InterTV Cabugi's superintendent, Dirceu Simabucuru: as TV Costa Branca, aiming to start its digital signal in the largest cities of the state, outside of Natal. According to Simabucuru, TV Costa Branca was set to cover more than half of Rio Grande do Norte, helping commerce in the interior of the state. For superintendent Dirceu Simabucuru, the idea was to produce local news and other programs from Mossoró and confirmed the creation of offices in other cities, such as Caicó.

In addition to R$ 17 million presented for the bid, another R$ 7 million were invested to build and equip its headquarters, close to Campus Central da Universidade do Estado do RN (UERN), likely at Rua Professor Antônio Campos, totalling R$ 24 million. There was the possibility of hiring one or two more reporting teams.

Outside of Mossoró, the station would take over InterTV Cabugi's relay network.

It was thought that the broadcaster would start broadcasting in the first half of 2013, from Mossoró to more than half of the state and will cover the Oeste Potiguar regions (formed by the micro-regions of Mossoró, Pau dos Ferros, Vale do Açu, Chapada do Apodi, Médio Oeste, Serra de São Miguel and Alto Oeste and Central Potiguar (this one formed by the following micro-regions: Macau, Angicos, Serra de Santana, Seridó Oeste and Seridó Oriental), will receive the signal from Rede Globo through InterTV Costa Branca.

However, with the arrival of 2014, the promise of the station's inauguration in 2013 did not occur, which led to the assumption of the probable loss of the station's concession to Rede InterTV, which did not happen.

=== 2014: Tests ===
With the arrival of 2014, tests for the inauguration of the future station were announced. As a result, work on the land began at an accelerated pace and must be completed well in advance so that equipment and the entire operational structure of the departments can be installed.

In the last week of April and the first of May of the same year, the work of the station's technical team began and focused on adapting the tower, so that it can accommodate two antennas, the one for the analog transmitter (in operation) and the new antenna to be used for the digital signal, which will then install the digital transmitter and from that moment on, test adjustments to the new signal begin.

On May 20th of the same year, the digital signal from InterTV Costa Branca went on air, but retransmitted by InterTV Cabugi, as is already done on the analog channel (13).

With the start of Costa Branca's test signals, transmissions began to be generated in the new tower, built next to the land where the broadcaster operates, on Avenida Jorge Coelho de Andrade, in the Costa e Silva neighborhood, in front of the Expocenter.

The HD digital transmitter and the new analog transmitter, more modern and powerful than the extant one, in operation on VHF channel 13, was to be installed in this new tower.

The expectation was that the inauguration of Mossoró's first commercial channel would take place at the beginning of October.

=== 2015: Preparation and inauguration ===
At the beginning of 2015, it was announced that the station would open on March 27, with a signal in 123 cities in the interior of Rio Grande do Norte.

On March 11, the station's directors presented advertising agencies in Mossoró with a request to invest in business in the city and the west of the state.

The journalist and federal civil servant working at UFERSA, Carlos Adans, was hired by the broadcaster to be the presenter of the evening news program RNTV 2nd edition.

The station's tests began on 24 and 25 February 2015. The official inauguration of the station took place on the 27 of March of the same year with the local edition of RNTV 2nd edition for the entire coverage area.

On the night of March 27, 2015, the station was officially opened with the news program RNTV 2nd edition.

On July 29, Journalist Sara Cardoso, who presented InterTV Rural, took over the RNTV Mossoró bench. Sara became editor-in-chief of InterTV Rural and reporter Ivanúcia Lopes took over presenting the Sunday program.

==== Layoffs and end of local news ====
In December 2015, the dismissal of journalism and engineering professionals from InterTV Costa Branca was announced, also causing the end of the local edition of RNTV 2nd edition. With financial problems, it was speculated that the broadcaster would close its activities, which the group denied. In July 2022, InterTV Costa Branca hired reporter Franciélly Medeiros to produce reports in Currais Novos and Seridó. In September 2022, after Franciélly Medeiros left for InterTV Cabugi, in Natal, reporter Pedro Albuquerque was hired, remaining at InterTV Costa Branca until February 2023 and, from March 2023 to June 2023, reporter Lázaro Jordão was responsible for covering Currais Novos and Seridó. From September 2023, reporter Cardoso Silva becomes responsible for covering Seridó, producing reports directly from Caicó.

== Technical information ==
| Virtual channel | Digital channel | Aspect ratio | Content |
|---|---|---|---|
| 18.1 | 47 UHF | 1080i | InterTV Costa Branca/Globo's main schedule |
