= TV Brasil Internacional =

International Portuguese-language television network

- Country: Programs produced from: Brazil; Operates from: Rio de Janeiro, Brazil via Maputo, Mozambique & Asia
- Broadcast area: International

Programming
- Language: Portuguese

Ownership
- Owner: Brazilian Government
- Key people: Nelson Breve (president)

History
- Launched: 24 May 2010
- Replaced: TV Brasil – Canal Integración

Links
- Website: TV Brasil Internacional

TV Brasil Internacional is an international television station based in the city of the Rio de Janeiro, Brazil and also via Maputo in Mozambique. It broadcasts in the Portuguese language and was launched on 24 May 2010, replacing TV Brasil – Canal Integración, which closed on 31 March.

Initially it is scheduled to broadcast to 49 African nations. There are plans then to roll it out in Latin America, North America, Caribbean, Europe, Arab world, South Asia, Asia Pacific and Australia.

== History ==
Luiz Inácio Lula da Silva, President of Brazil, launched the television station on 24 May 2010 at a ceremony in Itamaraty Palace in Brasília where the Foreign Affairs Ministry is based. He portrayed the aim of the project as "presenting Brazil to the world. He called it as "the realisation of a dream [...] I don't want a TV channel to speak well of Lula. I want a channel that speaks well of the country, that can show Brazil as it really is". He also said: "We want a network that talks about politics in quality terms, leaving aside prejudices because this will be a public network showing how Brazilians are beyond our borders".

The BBC's Americas editor James Read said it "shows Brazil's growing interest in Africa".

President of Mozambique Armando Emilio Guebuza said TV Brasil Internacional would "enrich communication between Brazil and Africa" in his remarks that were recorded prior to the ceremony's occurrence.

On 1 December 2010, it launched in Portugal on MEO, followed by 15 December on Dish Network in the United States.

In April 2016, the Michel Temer government announced the termination of TV Brasil Internacional's satellite distribution to cut costs, as part of a proposed plan to scrap TV Brasil altogether. The closure was effective on 5 May.

In October 2023, the third Lula government announced a reactivation plan for the channel, effective 2024. The channel restarted on 12 March 2024, with coverage in twelve countries, and on the internet. The potential target audience was now of 4.5 million Brazilians abroad. On 18 June 2026, it resumed broadcasting to Portugal via the MEO platform after a ten-year absence.

== Audience ==
Among the countries in Africa to avail themselves of TV Brasil Internacional are those that speak the Portuguese language: Angola, Cape Verde, Guinea-Bissau, Mozambique and São Tomé and Príncipe. Luiz Inácio Lula da Silva has made several visits to the African continent and expressed interest in the promotion of Afro-Brazilian bilateral ties. Brazilian football and soap operas are keenly followed by the inhabitants of Portuguese-speaking Africa. The government of Brazil agreed to a deal with Africa's pay TV operator MultiChoice for signal distribution. TV Brasil Internacional's target audience also includes around three million Brazilians who are outside Brazil.

== Programming ==
TV Brasil broadcasts its programming on TV Brasil Internacional, focusing on news and culture topics.
