= InterTV Cabugi =

InterTV Cabugi (ZYP 299)
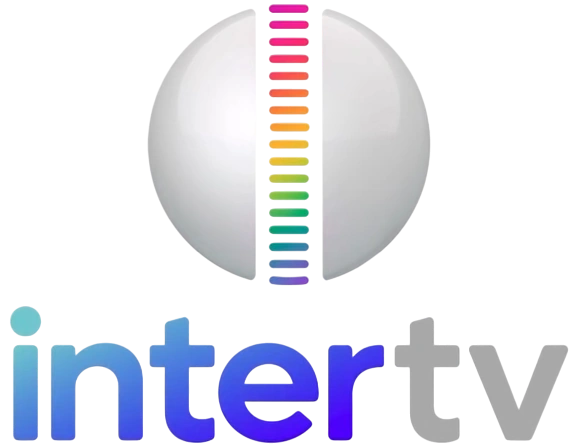
- Natal, Rio Grande do Norte; Brazil
- Channels: Digital: 34 (UHF); Virtual: 11
- Branding: InterTV

Programming
- Affiliations: TV Globo

Ownership
- Owner: Rede InterTV (50%) Sistema Tribuna de Comunicação (50%); (Televisão Cabugi Ltda.)

History
- Founded: December 17, 1986
- First air date: September 1, 1987
- Former call signs: ZYB 562 (1987–2018)
- Former names: TV Cabugi (1987–2005)
- Former channel numbers: Analog: 11 (VHF, 1987–2018)

Technical information
- Licensing authority: ANATEL
- ERP: 5 kW
- Transmitter coordinates: 5°47′48.9″S 35°11′46.4″W

Links
- Public license information: Profile
- Website: redeglobo.globo.com/rn/intertvrn

InterTV Cabugi (channel 11) is a Brazilian television station based in Natal, capital of the state of Rio Grande do Norte that is affiliated with TV Globo. The station is owned by Sistema Tribuna de Comunicação, owned by businessman and politician Henrique Eduardo Alves, who controls half of the shares with Rede InterTV, a company of the Grupo Incospal, owned by businessman Fernando Aboudib Camargo, as well as InterTV Costa Branca de Mossoró. Its studios are located in the Lagoa Nova neighborhood, and its transmission antenna is in Parque das Dunas, in Tirol.

== History ==
The concession for VHF channel 11 in Natal was granted on December 17, 1986, to politician Aluízio Alves, then minister of federal administration in the government of President José Sarney. After almost a year of preparations, TV Cabugi was opened on September 1, 1987, being the second of three stations to go on air that year in the municipality (along with TV Ponta Negra, opened on March 15, and TV Tropical, on October 31), and the third television station in the state, in addition to being the last state in Brazil to receive a Rede Globo affiliate.

The station's first headquarters was a small building located in the Lagoa Nova neighborhood, where fifteen years later, its current headquarters would be built next door, with extensive facilities, fully adapted to a TV station. The first programs produced by the channel were Bom Dia RN and RNTV, the latter in 3 daily editions. It has also produced several other programs throughout its history, such as Cabugi Verão, Cabugi Cidade, Meio Dia RN and Valeu o Boi. However, most of the time it was limited to filling Rede Globo's mandatory local programming. In national programming, the broadcaster has always been in first place in audience ratings, but its local news programs have always suffered from the police programs shown by competitors, which often reach peaks of leadership.

A few years after its inauguration, it began to internalize its signal with retransmitters in several municipalities, some of them shared with other channels, such as TV Universitária. In Mossoró, the second largest city in the state, the signal previously retransmitted from TV Verdes Mares in Fortaleza, Ceará (relay station on VHF channel 13) was replaced by TV Cabugi's relay. The city also gained a commercial and journalism office, responsible for coverage of the inland region, which sent its material via mail (bus) for broadcast in Natal. In 1998, it opened its internet portal, Cabugi.com, becoming one of the first broadcasters in the state to maintain its content on the web. It also maintained, directly or indirectly, other parallel businesses, such as FM 102.9 (sold years later to Rede Aleluia), Cabuginet, Cabugitec and Cabugisat.

Throughout its history, it has also been accused of favoring the political group to which it is linked in its programming, even having its signal removed from the air by decision of the Electoral Court in 2006. In August 2005, amid rumors that reported the poor financial situation of the controlling group, the station had half of its shares sold to Rede InterTV, controlled by businessman Fernando Aboudib Camargo. The broadcaster was incorporated into the network in September of the following year, becoming InterTV Cabugi. There was immediately a mass layoff, especially affecting older employees, marking the beginning of the broadcaster's restructuring, which also included the shutdown of the Cabugi.com portal and its replacement by in360.

In 2009, it replaced the old inland microwave links with satellite transmission. On March 27, 2015, after InterTV Costa Branca was opened in Mossoró, much of its coverage in the inland of Rio Grande do Norte was incorporated by the new station, and InterTV Cabugi was reduced to 44 municipalities in the eastern portion of the state.

In December 2019, InterTV Cabugi carried out layoffs. 8 cameramen and 5 film reporters were dismissed from the company's team. On July 13, 2020, the broadcaster ended production of the sports journalist Globo Esporte RN and fired its entire team, such as presenter and editor Thiago Cesar and video reporters Luiz Gustavo Ribeiro and Douglas Lemos.

== Technical information ==
Virtual channel	Digital channel	Aspect ratio	Content
11.1	34 UHF	1080i	InterTV Cabugi/Globo's main schedule

The station began its digital transmissions on March 22, 2010, on channel 34 UHF. The digital signal launch ceremony took place at the broadcaster's headquarters. On December 2, 2013, local news programs began to be shown in high definition.

Based on the federal decree transitioning Brazilian TV stations from analog to digital signals, InterTV Cabugi, as well as the other stations in Natal, ceased broadcasting on VHF channel 11 on May 30, 2018, following the official ANATEL schedule.
