= João Inácio Júnior =

Brazilian radio and television presenter

João Inácio Junior is a Brazilian radio host, television presenter, former news anchor and journalist born in the Brazilian state of Ceará.

He began his career in Rádio Verdes Mares in 1978, working alongside the TV Verdes Mares, Globo TV's affiliate in the state of Ceará.

In the early 1980s, he launched the program Disque e Toque(Dial and Touch) on FM 93 that showed up in 1982 in which year he entered the Verdes Mares AM Radio.

For many years, he was anchor of the Jornal do 10 (Journal of Channel 10).

Currently, he presents João Inacio's Show in TV Diário, whose success is present throughout the country.
