= Rede União =

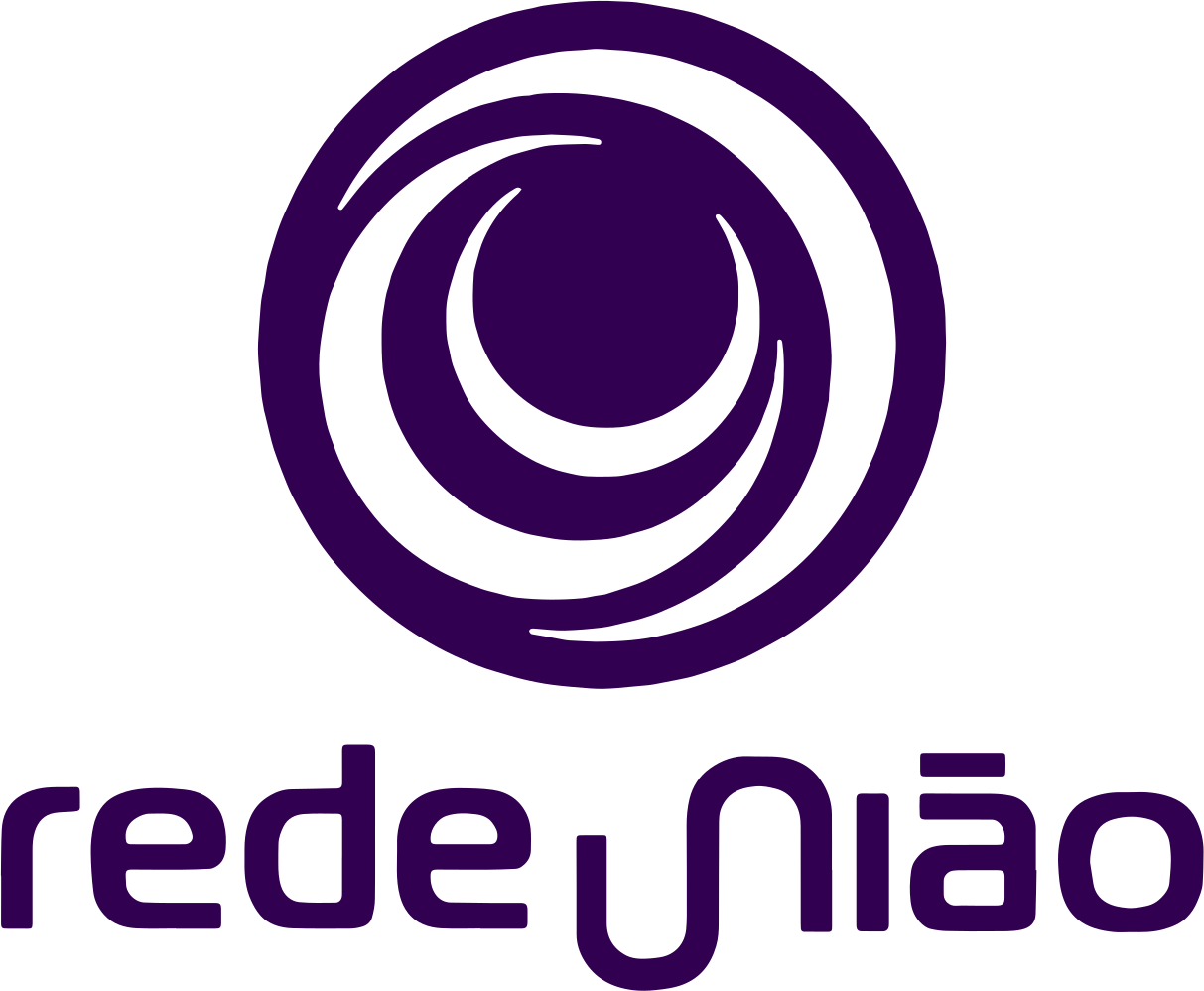
- Logo used since 2023
- Country: Brazil
- Broadcast area: Ceará, Brasília and Acre; Nationwide (via cable and satellite)
- Headquarters: Fortaleza, Ceará

Programming
- Language: Brazilian Portuguese
- Picture format: 1080i HDTV

Ownership
- Owner: Rede União de Rádio e Televisão Ltda.
- Sister channels: TV Verdes Mares; FM 93; Rádio Verdes Mares

History
- Launched: 2001

Links
- Website: tvdiario.verdesmares.com.br

Availability

Terrestrial
- Digital terrestrial television: 23 UHF (Fortaleza)

Rede União is a Brazilian over-the-air television network headquartered in Fortaleza, capital of the state of Ceará, with owned-and-operated stations in Brasília, Distrito Federal, and Rio Branco, Acre.

== História ==
In 1988, Fortaleza-born José Alberto Bardawil, acquired an over-the-air television license in Rio Branco, creating in August that year, TV União, a Rede Bandeirantes affiliate. Until 1990, it had installed relay station in seven Acrean municipalities.

Around October 1997, Bardawil launched Rede Brasiliense de Comunicação, in Brasília, whose line-up consisted of news bulletins and music videos from concerts. At the time, he planned to launch a national network with presence in other states, obtaining grants through companies with artists, such as singer Fábio Jr., in São Paulo. In Fortaleza, where his supporter was singer Raimundo Fagner, he received in late 1997 a license in Fortaleza, winning a license which competed with four other media groups, among them, Sistema Verdes Mares.

In November 2000, TV União in Acre ceased relaying Rede Bandeirantes' programming by becoming independent, and in 2001, it inaugurated its affiliate in Fortaleza, which became Rede União's flagship. After two years broadcasting exclusively music videos, the station in the Cearese capital started investing a new line-up for the youth in 2003, with programs related to artistic culture as well as news. At the time, RBC had been renamed TV União, even though it was affiliated to networks like TV Cultura and, between 2003 and 2005, RedeTV!; after that, all of its national network slots were given to Rede União.

Around early 2005, Rede União's signal started to be delivered by satellite using the NSS-806 satellite, covering all of America and part of Europe, enabling its expansion throughout Brazil through relay stations, first in Jundiaí, in the inland area of São Paulo, and later Natal, through affiliate TV União de Natal, on cable. In two years, it was available in São Paulo, Rio de Janeiro and Belo Horizonte with over-the-air relay stations. From 2007, retransmission in other parts of Brazil of the newly-launched Rede Brasil de Televisão enabled Rede União to reach state capitals such as São Luís, Palmas, Goiânia and Porto Alegre, as well as gaining new channels in cities where it was available and expanding through the states.

In February 2009, after TV Diário's satellite signal was encrypted for all of Brasil, limiting it to the state of Ceará, Rede União became the only national television network to generate its signal locally for a national audience, which led to it gaining an affiliate, Oeste TV, of Carapicuíba, in São Paulo, formerly of TV Diário. In 2013, its signal was transferred to the SES-6 satellite, replacement of NSS-806, which had its position altered.

After its coverage reached 250 Brazilian municipalities, throughout the second half of the 2010s, Rede União lost several relay stations over time. and lost its satellite signal, being limited to the cities of Fortaleza, Brasília and Rio Branco and TV União Natal.
