= InterTV Serra+Mar =

InterTV Serra+Mar (ZYP 301)
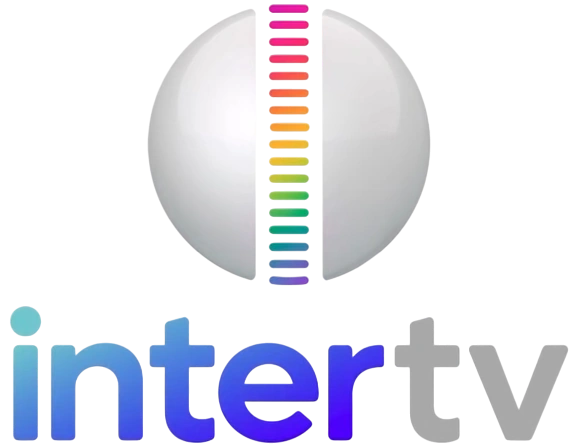
- Nova Fribugo, Rio de Janeiro; Brazil
- Channels: Digital: 30 (UHF); Virtual: 12

Programming
- Affiliations: TV Globo

Ownership
- Owner: Rede InterTV; (Canal e Transmissões InterTV Ltda.)

History
- Founded: May 1, 1990
- Former call signs: ZYB 522 (1990-2018)
- Former names: TV Serra+Mar (1990-2004)
- Former channel numbers: Analog: 12 (VHF, 1990-2018)

Technical information
- Licensing authority: ANATEL

Links
- Public license information: Profile
- Website: redeglobo.globo.com/rj/intertvrj/

InterTV Serra+Mar (channel 12) is a television station licensed to Nova Friburgo, Rio de Janeiro, Brazil affiliated with TV Globo. The station is owned by Rede InterTV.

== History ==
The license for VHF channel 12 in Nova Friburgo was granted, after public competition, by president José Sarney on June 23, 1988, to a company formed by senator Cláudio Chagas Freitas (son of former governor of Rio de Janeiro, Chagas Freitas) together with Hélio Paulo Ferraz, Carlos Eduardo Coelho Magalhães and Antônio Carlos Assis Brasil.

The TV Serra+Mar went on air on May 1, 1990. The first week on the air saw the start of the local edition of RJTV, presented by Ana Lucia Morais. Programs were produced as the magazine SM TV and SM Rural. Another product of the station was the site ISerramar.com, disabled in 2004. Between 1996 and 2004, the TV Serra+Mar was the relay in the northwest of Rio de Janeiro, with a branch in Itaperuna. In 1995 it was acquired by Grupo Globo, becoming an owned-and-operated station.

In 2004, station is renamed InterTV Serra+Mar, retransmitting local programming of Rede InterTV, formed in the State of Rio also by InterTV Alto Litoral and InterTV Planície. In January 2005, the local TV Serra+Mar news are no longer anchored in Nova Friburgo and are centralized in São Pedro da Aldeia, the former headquarters of InterTV Alto Litoral. Currently, the signal comes in some neighborhoods of Rio de Janeiro, through its relay in Petropolis, on UHF channel 14.

In 2007, the InterTV Serra+Mar leaves his headquarters where he ran for 17 years at the top of the neighborhood Cascatinha toward central Nova Friburgo. The current headquarters of the InterTV Serra+Mar is located in the neighborhood Parque São Clemente. In Petropolis, the branch located at Rua Marechal Deodoro Center. The station has had branches in Teresopolis and Itaperuna.

== Coverage From InterTV Serra+Mar ==
The InterTV Serra+Mar covers 15 municipalities in the região serrana, 3 Of Noroeste and 1 of the Baixada Litorênea, which are:

- Aperibé
- Areal
- Bom Jardim - Channels 4 and 8
- Cachoeiras de Macacu
- Cantagalo - Channel 5
- Carmo - Channel 26
- Cordeiro - Channel 4
- Duas Barras - Channel 4
- Itaocara - Channel 46
- Macuco
- Nova Friburgo - Channel 12
- Petrópolis - Channel 14
- Santa Maria Madalena - Channel 13
- Santo Antônio de Pádua - Channel 11
- São José do Vale do Rio Preto - Channel 16
- São Sebastião do Alto
- Sumidouro - Channel 8
- Teresópolis - Channel 26
- Trajano de Morais - Channel 9

== Programming ==
- Bom Dia Rio, transmitted by Globo Rio.
- Bom Dia Rio (bloco local), made by Cristina Frazão, generated in Cabo Frio by InterTV Alto Litoral.
- InterTV Notícia, made by Ana Paula Mendes and Antônio Coelho, generated in Cabo Frio by InterTV Alto Litoral.
- RJ InterTV, first edition made by Ana Paula Mendes, generated in Cabo Frio by InterTV Alto Litoral. Second edition made by Luciana Thomaz, single program produced in Nova Friburgo.
- InterTV Rural, made by Ivan Lemos, generated in Cabo Frio by InterTV Alto Litoral.

== Reporters ==
- Maria Valente (Petrópolis)
- Karen de Souza (Petrópolis)
- Leandro Oliveira (Nova Friburgo)
- Bruna Verly (Nova Friburgo)
- Guilherme Peixoto (journalist) (Nova Friburgo)
- Marcela Lima (Nova Friburgo)
