= Record Interior RJ =

Record Interior RJ (ZYP 305)
- Campos dos Goytacazes, Rio de Janeiro; Brazil
- Channels: Digital: 38 (UHF); Virtual: 12

Programming
- Affiliations: Record

Ownership
- Owner: Grupo Record; (Rádio Jornal Fluminense de Campos Ltda.)
- Sister stations: Radio Record Campos

History
- First air date: July 16, 1981
- Former call signs: ZYB 516 (1981-2018)
- Former names: TV Norte Fluminense (1981–1997); TV Record Norte Fluminense (1997–2016); RecordTV Interior RJ (2016–2023)
- Former channel numbers: Analog: 12 (VHF, 1981-2018)
- Former affiliations: Rede Globo (1981–1995); Rede Bandeirantes (1995–1997)

Technical information
- Licensing authority: ANATEL
- ERP: 2.5 kW
- Transmitter coordinates: 21°46′33.2″S 41°18′32.9″W

Links
- Public license information: Profile
- Website: record.r7.com/record-emissoras/sudeste/record-interior-rj/

Record Interior RJ (channel 12) is a Record-owned-and-operated station licensed to the city of Campos dos Goytacazes. It was founded in 1981 as TV Norte Fluminense and gained its current affiliation in 1997.

== History ==
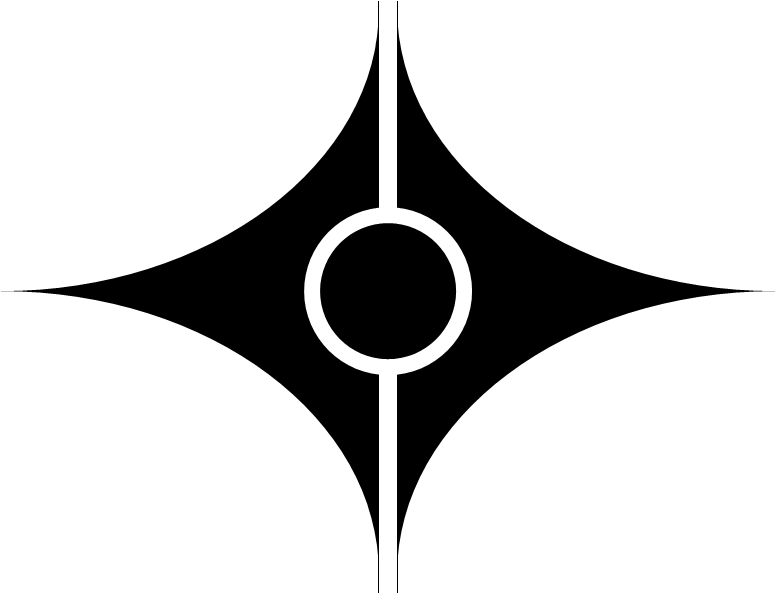
Logo used between 1981 and 1997, when the station was called TV Norte Fluminense. It was created by artist Paulo Jorge.

The station opened on July 16, 1981, under the name TV Norte Fluminense, by federal deputy Alair Ferreira. In its first fourteen years on air, the station was a Rede Globo affiliate. The pre-launch period was seen with preparation problems, such as the lack of staff. Two and a half months before it opened, Alair hired Giannino Sossai as its first news director. At the beginning of operations, the station only had one slot for local programming, shortly after 10pm. During the Globo phase, its news bulletin, following the Praça TV pattern, was known as NFTV.

On October 1, 1995, the station left Globo without prior warning and joined Rede Bandeirantes; Globo's affiliation defected to TV Alto Litoral. In 1997, the station was sold to Edir Macedo, becoming a Record O&O. This was part of an aggressive push initiated by the network to increase its affiliate base, which was primarily dominated by former Rede Manchete affiliates. In December 2007, the station was owned by UCKG pastor Marcelo da Silva, who, at the time, was the president of the adjacent station in the state capital.

On December 2, 2023, Record Interior RJ started delivering its signal by satellite using the SAT HD Regional system, but was removed on January 13, 2025.
