= Redevida =

Brazilian Catholic television network

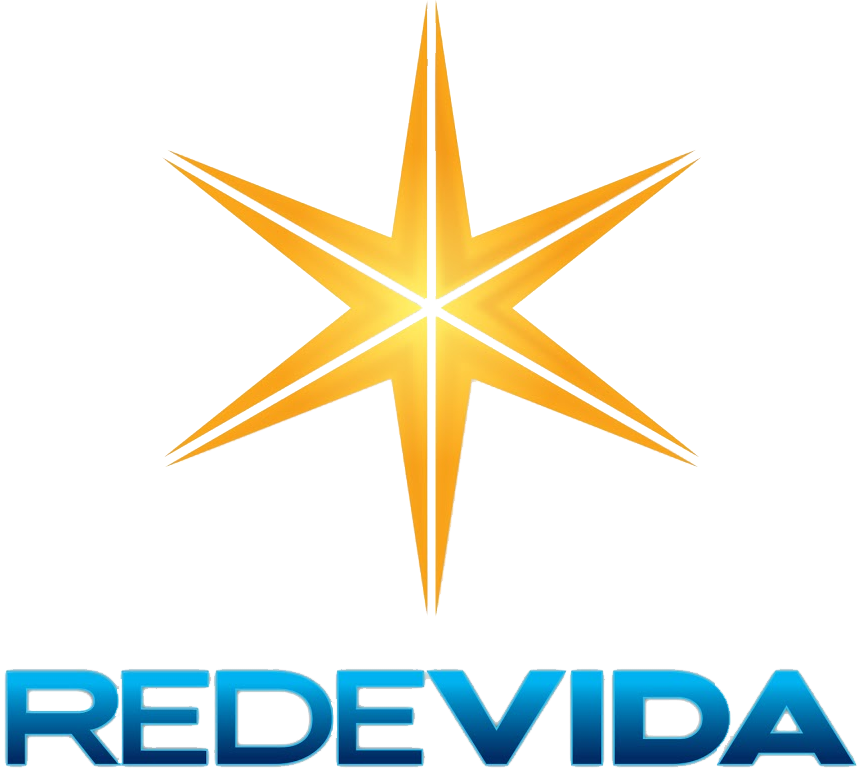
- Country: Brazil
- Broadcast area: 90% of Brazilian territory
- Headquarters: São José do Rio Preto, SP; Avenida Geraldina Verônica Batista de Carvalho, 400 – Jardim Yolanda; São Paulo, SP; Edifício Dom Antonio Maria Mucciolo – Rua Traipú, 273 – Perdizes

Programming
- Picture format: 1080i HDTV

Ownership
- Owner: Instituto Brasileiro de Comunicação Cristã (INBRAC)

History
- Launched: May 1, 1995

Links
- Website: www.redevida.com.br

Redevida (stylized in upper case) is a Brazilian Catholic television network headquartered in São José do Rio Preto, SP, covering 90% of the Brazilian territory through affiliated networks and satellite. It was founded on May 1, 1995. The channel is one of 16 commercial channels that is required for carriage on all satellite providers.

== History ==
=== Background ===
The idea of forming the Rede Vida de Televisão was born during the government of Brazilian president José Sarney. At the time, the dispute over channel 11 in São José do Rio Preto was great, and with the support of Augusto Marzagão, Sarney's advisor, João Monteiro de Barros Filho obtained the concession in 1991. Winning the dispute for the São José do Rio Preto generator was the first step in the trajectory of the Catholic broadcaster. The second imbroglio was convincing the CNBB to approve the project. Monteiro Filho managed to obtain two important endorsements to move the project forward: that of the metropolitan archbishop of Botucatu (SP), Dom Antonio Maria Mucciolo, and the Archbishop of Mariana (MG), Dom Luciano Mendes de Almeida.

On December 17, 1992, Monteiro Filho accepted the suggestion of Dom Luciano Mendes de Almeida and founded the Brazilian Institute of Christian Communication, INBRAC, with statutes suggested by professor Celso Neves and by jurist João Grandino Rodas. After the concession was approved by the national congress and INBRAC was formed, Monteiro Filho went in search of investors, Catholic partners and sponsors. On Christmas of 1994, the archbishop of Botucatu received a phone call from Andrade Vieira, announcing that Bamerindus would be Redevida's first advertiser, paying for the advertisements in advance.

The station had its first broadcasts on June 20, 1995. The first image displayed was a 5-second countdown with behind-the-scenes footage from the station, followed by the reading of a letter from Pope John Paul II addressed to Dom Antonio Maria Mucciolo, blessing the network, and a speech by Dom Antonio. Then, the first mass shown by the station, celebrated by Father José Luiz, was broadcast live.

=== 2005-present ===
Years later, with the foundation of TV Aparecida, broadcaster of the National Sanctuary of Our Lady of Aparecida in Aparecida/SP, began retransmitting the Missa de Aparecida, which is shown daily in the mornings. It also has a partnership with CTV, broadcasting the Sunday Angelus, held in São Pedro Square by Pope Francis and also masses from other places in Brazil.

In 2014, the presenter and Father Lúcio Cesquin began to host O Santo Terço with the live participation of viewers by telephone, letters and e-mails. As a Catholic television channel, Redevida maintains a relationship with the Dioceses of Brazil, retransmitting material from the dioceses in reports on JCTV and in Jornal da Vida.

On July 15, 2024, Redevida deactivated its transmission signal via analog satellite dish, migrating to digital satellite dish in Ku Band.

== Programming ==
Redevida offers mainly Catholic programming, such as masses, novenas and rosaries, but also news, interviews, variety and sports programs. The channel broadcasts lower-division Campeonato Paulista football games (Série A2, A3 and Segunda Divisão) and Copa São Paulo.

== See also ==
- 2005 in Brazilian television
- Catholic television
- Television in Brazil
