= InterTV Alto Litoral =

InterTV Alto Litoral (ZYP 300)
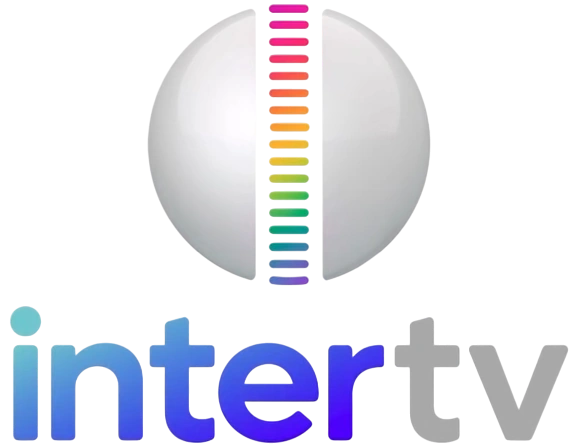
- Cabo Frio, Rio de Janeiro; Brazil
- Channels: Digital: 30 (UHF); Virtual: 8

Programming
- Affiliations: TV Globo

Ownership
- Owner: Rede InterTV; (Empreendimentos Radiodifusão Cabo Frio Ltda.)

History
- Founded: September 30, 1989
- Former call signs: ZYB 521 (1989-2018)
- Former names: TV Lagos (1989-1997); TV Alto Litoral (1997-2004)
- Former channel numbers: Analog: 8 (VHF, 1989-2018)}

Technical information
- Licensing authority: ANATEL

Links
- Public license information: Profile
- Website: redeglobo.globo.com/rj/intertvrj/

InterTV Alto Litoral (channel 8) is a television station licensed to Cabo Frio, Rio de Janeiro, Brazil affiliated to TV Globo, covering the Lagos region and the northern end of the state. The station is owned by Rede InterTV.

== History ==
The license for VHF channel 8 in Cabo Frio was granted, after public competition, by president José Sarney on July 22, 1988, to a company formed by businessmen Cleófas Uchoa, Jacques-Louis Mercier and Mário Campos da Silveira (both excutivos with connections to Embratel in the president's government), alongside the then secretary-general of the Ministry of Communications, Rômulo Villar Furtado, and then-federal deputee Arolde de Oliveira. After one month in test phase, TV Lagos opened on September 30, 1989, at noon, airing a documentary on its founding, followed by Rede Globo's regular programming, achieving its second affiliate in the state's inland region.

Its studios were initially located in the neighboring city of São Pedro da Aldeia, located in the Vinhateiro neighborhood, in the central region of Cabo Frio. Initially it largely relayed the signal of TV Globo Rio de Janeiro, only producing a local edition of RJTV's second edition, as well as the news bulletin Lagos Notícia, shown throughout the schedule.

In January 1996, Rede Globo acquired 100% of TV Lagos' shares, similar to what happened the previous year with TV Serra+Mar in Nova Friburgo.The station was renamed TV Alto Litoral in 1997, expanding its coverage area to the Norte Fluminense region, opening offices in Macaé and Campos dos Goytacazes, which were taken over by the station since TV Norte Fluminense left Globo in 1995. With the expansion, there was also an increase in its local news operation, and the station started producing two editions of RJTV for its coverage area.

Following a series of unsuccessful investments at Globo Cabo, Rede Globo sold its shares on 27 stations in March 2002, among them, TV Alto Litoral. In October 2003, the broadcaster was sold, along with TV Serra+Mar and TV Grande Minas de Montes Claros, Minas Gerais to the Espírito Santo businessman Fernando Aboudib Camargo.

From the merger of several stations under its control, Rede InterTV was formed, becoming InterTV Alto Litoral, as well as the regional network's flagship for Rio de Janeiro, a position which became more evident in January 2005, when InterTV's directorate shut down InterTV Serra+Mar and InterTV Planície's local programming (later acquisition), becoming relayers of the Cabo Frio station. In 2008, after 19 years, InterTV Alto Litoral left its former headquarters at Vinhateiro and moved to the Porto do Carro neighborhood.

== Technical information ==
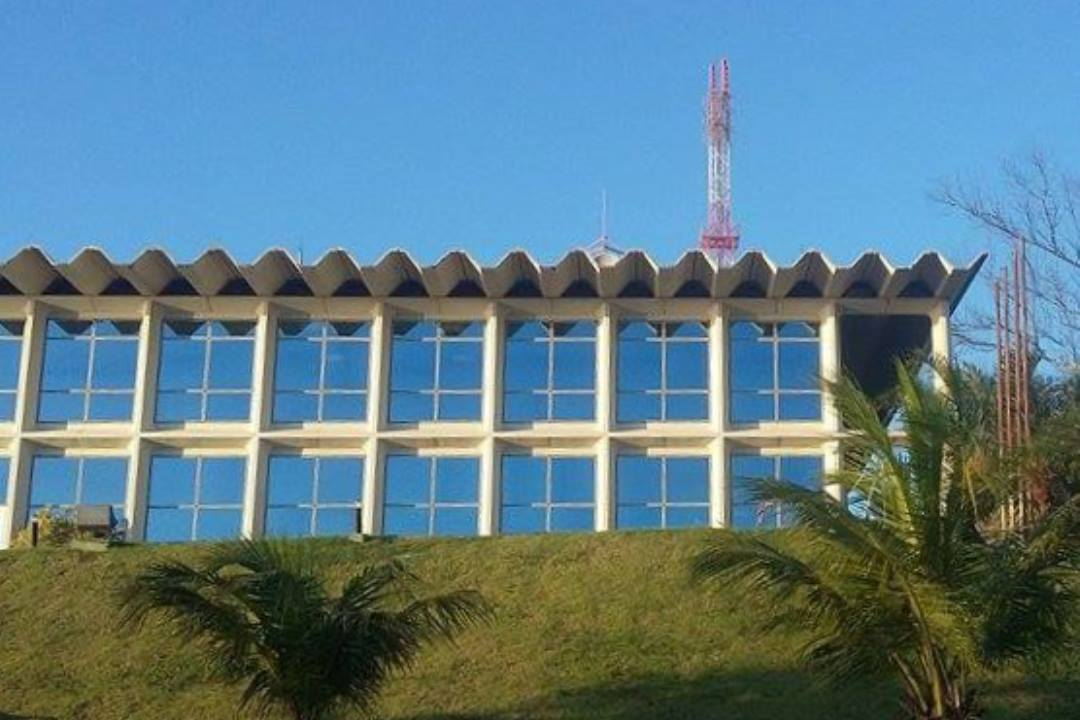
Headquarters in 2016

Virtual	Physical	Screen	Content
8.1	33 UHF	1080i	InterTV Alto Litoral/Globo's main schedule

The station started its digital broadcasts on December 2, 2011, through UHF channel 33 for Cabo Frio and adjacent areas. On March 14, 2016, it started producing local programming in high definition. Its analog signal shut down on December 12, 2018, following the official ANATEL roadmap.
