= TV Diário =

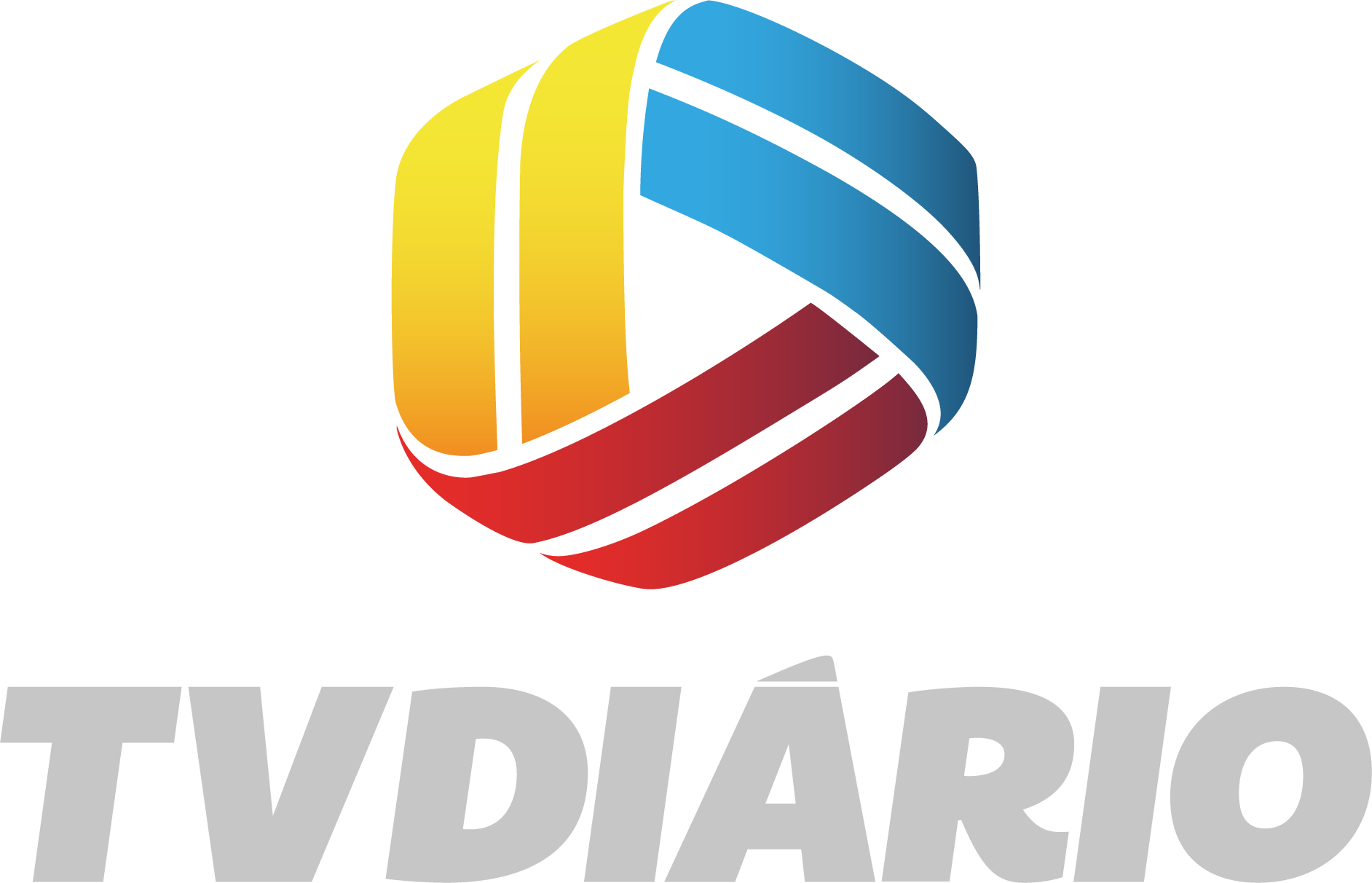
- Logo used since 2023
- Country: Brazil
- Broadcast area: State of Ceará; Nationwide (via cable and satellite)
- Headquarters: Fortaleza, Ceará

Programming
- Language: Brazilian Portuguese
- Picture format: 1080i HDTV

Ownership
- Owner: TV Diário Ltda. (Sistema Verdes Mares)
- Sister channels: TV Verdes Mares; FM 93; Rádio Verdes Mares

History
- Launched: 6 January 1997
- Former names: TV COM (1997–1998)

Links
- Website: tvdiario.verdesmares.com.br

Availability

Terrestrial
- Digital terrestrial television: 23 UHF (Fortaleza)

TV Diário (Daily TV) is a Brazilian television station based in the city of Fortaleza, capital of the state of Ceará. It belongs to the Sistema Verdes Mares, one of the main media conglomerates in the country, which also includes TV Verdes Mares, FM 93 and Verdes Mares radios and the newspaper Diário do Nordeste. The station is known for producing entirely local programming focused on the customs of the Northeast Region of Brazil.

== History ==
=== Early years (1998-2000) ===
The station opened on 1 July (or June 30, according to other sources) 1998, broadcasting on channel 22 in Fortaleza.

Little programming information survives, but the station showed programs that did not display TV Verdes Mares, because it was affiliated with Rede Globo, which allowed only the news space.

The station showed exclusive programming to its 4 million person audience. Initially activities began at 8 am and ended at midnight. A few months later, the schedule added hours. The station showed connections with the Brazilian Northeast in its themes, colloquial language and vernacular.

=== Via satellite (2001-2009) ===
On March 20, 2001, the station went national via satellite. Its signal reached across Brazil via Brasilsat (later moving to StarOne C2). The signal carried throughout South America, parts of Central America and the Caribbean. In 2003 relay stations reached all territories except Ceará and at the same time, earned its first affiliates.

In 2004, esmissora was replaced by five affiliates.

In 2005, the station covered the territory from Ceará, thanks to "twin stations" with the same name, covering parts of the western states of Rio Grande do Norte and Paraíba, north-west and north east of Pernambuco and Piaui.

Between 2005 and 2007, it added dozens of affiliates and relays in several Brazilian states in the Northeast, North, Midwest and Southeast, and became the country's fastest growing network.

The network succeeded in its intention to make a network with a different language, not seen before in the history of Brazilian television. It concentrated on talk shows, local production and low cost, with different personalities and singers of forró and other popular rhythms. It won a large audience in Brazil.

=== Outage ===
At midnight on 25 February 2009, TV Diário went dark without. The outage was due to pressure from Rede Globo, due to the excessive growth of TV Diário's audience in many parts of the country, including Rio-São Paulo, which threatened the market of Organizações Globo.

Rede Globo threatened regional group Sistema Verdes Mares with the loss of TV Verdes Mares.

== Affiliates ==
Acre

- TV Diário Rio Branco

Alagoas

- TV Diário Maceió

Amapá

- TV Diário Santana
- TV Diário Macapá

Amazonas

- TV Diário Manaus
- TV Diário Tefé
- TV Diário Iranduba
- TV Diário Coari
- TV Diário Itacoatiara

Bahia

- TV Diário Bahia

Espírito Santo

- TV Diário ES

Maranhão:

- TV Diário Maranhão

Mato Grosso

- TV Vale Água Boa
- TVC (Nova Monte Verde)
- TV Comunitária de Diamantino
- TV Diário Cuiabá

Pará

- TV Breves
- TV Diário Pará

Roraima

- TV Cidade Boa Vista

== See also ==
- João Inácio Júnior
