= TV Aparecida =

Rede Aparecida
- Country: Brazil
- Broadcast area: For broadcast television, satellite signature in Brazil
- Headquarters: Aparecida, São Paulo

Programming
- Language: Portuguese
- Picture format: 1080i HDTV (downscaled to 480i for the SDTV feed)

Ownership
- Owner: Rede Aparecida de Comunicação

History
- Launched: September 8, 2005

Links
- Website: http://www.a12.com/tv

Availability

Terrestrial
- Digital: List: Channel 2.1 (São Paulo) Channel 14.1 (Cuiabá) Channel 22.1 (João Pessoa) Channel 24.1 (Goiânia and Maceió) Channel 26.1 (Manaus) Channel 27.1 (Belém) Channel 33.1 (Porto Velho) Channel 38.1 (Fortaleza) Channel 43.1 (Florianópolis) Channel 44.1 (Curitiba) Channel 46.1 (Palmas and Rio de Janeiro) Channel 48.1 (Campo Grande and São Luís) Channel 59.1 (Aparecida)

Rede Aparecida (Portuguese pronunciation: [ˈʁedʒi apaɾeˈsidɐ]), also known as TV Aparecida or simply Aparecida, is a Brazilian religious television channel based in the municipality of Aparecida in the state of São Paulo.

== History ==
TV Aparecida was an initiative with support from the Catholic Church. The Foundation Our Lady of Aparecida, the sponsor of radio for Aparecida, won the award to broadcast on UHF channel 59 of Aparecida - SP which went live on September 8, 2005.

In April 2010, it became part of the grid Telefónica Digital TV. That same year, on August 23, TV Aparecida made a partnership with the New Song and it held the station's first presidential debate. It is the first of its kind for a religious TV station in Brazil.

== Programs ==
Reality shows/Game shows

- Revelações Brasil
- Revelações Sertanejo
- Tudo em Família
- Quarta Show

Other programs

- Aparecida Sertaneja
- Brazil Elector (TV Cultura) (Brasil Eleitor)
- Forward (Em Frente)
- Living Area (Espaço Vida)
- Family in Focus (Família em Foco)
- Marine World (Mundo Marinho)
- New Telecourse (Novo Telecurso)
- Tuning (TV Camara) (Sintonia)
- TVendo & Learning (TVendo e Aprendendo)
- Via Legal
- Brazil Off-Road (Brasil Off-Road)
- More Sports (Mais Esportes)
- Family Cinema (Cine Família)
- Super Wednesday (Super Quarta)
- Clubti
- Et Cetera
- TJ Aparecida
- TJ Aparecida - Highlights of the Week (TJ Aparecida - Destaques da Semana)
- Curtains (Cortinas)
- Route Musical (Rota Musical)
- Directions - The Brazil of Song (Itaú Cultural) (Rumos - O Brasil da Música)
- Land of the Patron (Terra da Padroeira)
- Angelus with the Pope (CTV) (Angelus com o Papa)
- Welcome Romero (Bem-Vindo Romeiro)
- Consecration (Consagração)
- God With Us (Deus Conosco)
- God in My House (Deus em Minha Casa)
- Meeting with Devotees (Encontro com os Devotos)
- Holy People (Gente Santa)
- Church in Brazil (Igreja no Brasil)
- Mother Mary (Mãe Maria)
- Mass in Aparecida (Missa de Aparecida)
- Mass Matrix Basilica of Aparecida (Missa de Aparecida - Matriz Basílica)
- Mass of Padre Cicero (Missa do Padre Cícero)
- Novena of Aparecida (Novena de Aparecida)
- Think like Jesus thought (Pensar como Jesus Pensou)
- Third of Aparecida (Terço de Aparecida)
- Time (Na Hora)
- On the Road (Pé na Estrada)
- Flavor of Life (Sabor de Vida)
- Sanctuary in Action (Santuário em Ação)
- All Craft (Tudo Artesanal)
- Southern Living (Vida no Sul)
- Familia Rocha
- Apostles
- Laurel and Hardy
- Teresa of Los Andes

== See also ==
- 2005 in Brazilian television
- Catholic television
- Catholic television channels
- Catholic television networks
- Television in Brazil
