= TV Verdes Mares =

TV Verdes Mares (ZYA 425)
- Logo used since 2018
- Fortaleza, Ceará; Brazil
- Channels: Digital: 33 (UHF); Virtual: 10

Programming
- Affiliations: TV Globo (1974-)

Ownership
- Owner: Sistema Verdes Mares; (Televisão Verdes Mares Ltda.)
- Sister stations: TV Diário; Verdinha FM; FM 93

History
- Founded: September 19, 1966
- First air date: January 31, 1970
- Former channel numbers: Analog: 10 (VHF, 1970–2017)
- Former affiliations: REI (1970-1974)

Technical information
- Licensing authority: ANATEL
- ERP: 8 kW
- HAAT: 112 m (367 ft)
- Transmitter coordinates: 3°44′49.9″S 38°30′8.7″W

Links
- Public license information: Profile
- Website: redeglobo.globo.com/tvverdesmares

TV Verdes Mares (channel 10) is a television station licensed to Fortaleza, Ceará, Brazil, affiliated with TV Globo, serving as the flagship broadcasting property of locally based Sistema Verdes Mares, a company of the Grupo Edson Queiroz, alongside independent station TV Diário (channel 22). TV Verdes Mares's studios and transmitter are located on Desembargador Moreira Avenue, in the Dionísio Torres district of Fortaleza.

== History ==
=== Background history (1962–1970) ===
In 1962, the industrialist Moisés Pimentel, owner of Rádio Dragão do Mar (690 kHz, now Rádio Shalom Dragão do Mar), obtained a television license to operate on the VHF channel 10. In the same year, he was elected federal deputy through the Social Labour Party. While preparing the installation of TV Dragão do Mar, as the station would be branded, he presented to the local media all the equipment purchased for the project. However, due to the 1964 coup d'état, he was arrested and had his political office revoked on April 17 and ended up losing the TV and radio licenses. In June 1965, then Mayor of Fortaleza Murilo Borges, denounced the "subversive" character of the station, even without having started its operations.

In July of the same year, the entrepreneur Edson Queiroz acquires a TV license from Contel, approved on May 23, 1969, by then-president Costa e Silva. On July 30, the concession of the 10 VHF channel is finally handed over to Queiroz. Sixty days later, at a lunch at Fortaleza Air Base in honor of Wing Week, Edson officially announced the implementation of the second television channel in Fortaleza, which until then had only one TV station, TV Ceará (channel 2), a Rede Tupi owned-and-operated station, owned by the Diários Associados group.

On October 23, 1969, the station's signal went on air experimentally, not yet with the TV Verdes Mares branding. In record time, Queiroz began assembling the structure of the station, which would be located in an area of 9 000 m^{2} in the Estância Castelo district (now Dionísio Torres).

=== Independent station (1970–1974) ===
On January 31, 1970, at 7:30 pm, TV Verdes Mares was officially inaugurated, with a mass celebrated at the station's headquarters and the premiere of newscast Telejornal Padrão, with a duration of 20 minutes, anchored by journalist Mardônio Sampaio. The opening party had the presence of Hebe Camargo, Ronald Golias and Pedrinho Mattar.

In its beginnings, the station signed on at noon, with a 20-minute newscast anchored by Cirênio Cordeiro. At 10 pm, another newscast was broadcast, in a magazine format. Irapuan Lima and Matos Dourado hosted two auditorium variety shows at this time, while the other part of the schedule was filled with programs from Rede Globo and Rede de Emissoras Independentes, headed by TV Record and TV Rio. Inspired by sister radio station Rádio Verdes Mares (810 kHz), which had was acquired by Edson Queiroz seven years before its launch, most of its professionals were brought from the station. In a short time on the air, TV Verdes Mares surpasses TV Ceará's ratings.

From 1973 onwards, TV Verdes Mares began to have translator stations in the interior of Ceará and to some cities in other states, such as Mossoró, in Rio Grande do Norte.

=== TV Globo (1974–present) ===
In 1974, it began broadcasting Globo's programming as an official affiliate, and in the same year, it made the first color television broadcast throughout the Northeast of Brazil, during the broadcast of the Sereia de Ouro Trophy award, which happened on September 7. From 1994 onwards, it began to build its own transmission line for the translator stations in the interior.

In 2009, a new television news format was adopted in the station. In January, the new sports show Globo Esporte Ceará debuted, with longer duration and a couple of presenters, and in March, the newscasts Jornal do 10 and Jornal do Meio Dia were replaced by two editions of CETV, adapting to the standard format adopted nationally by Rede Globo and its affiliates.

On October 8, 2018, TV Verdes Mares's newscasts began be presented in a newsroom built to integrate all the vehicles of Sistema Verdes Mares, in addition to the debut of new graphic and sound packages.

== Identification ==
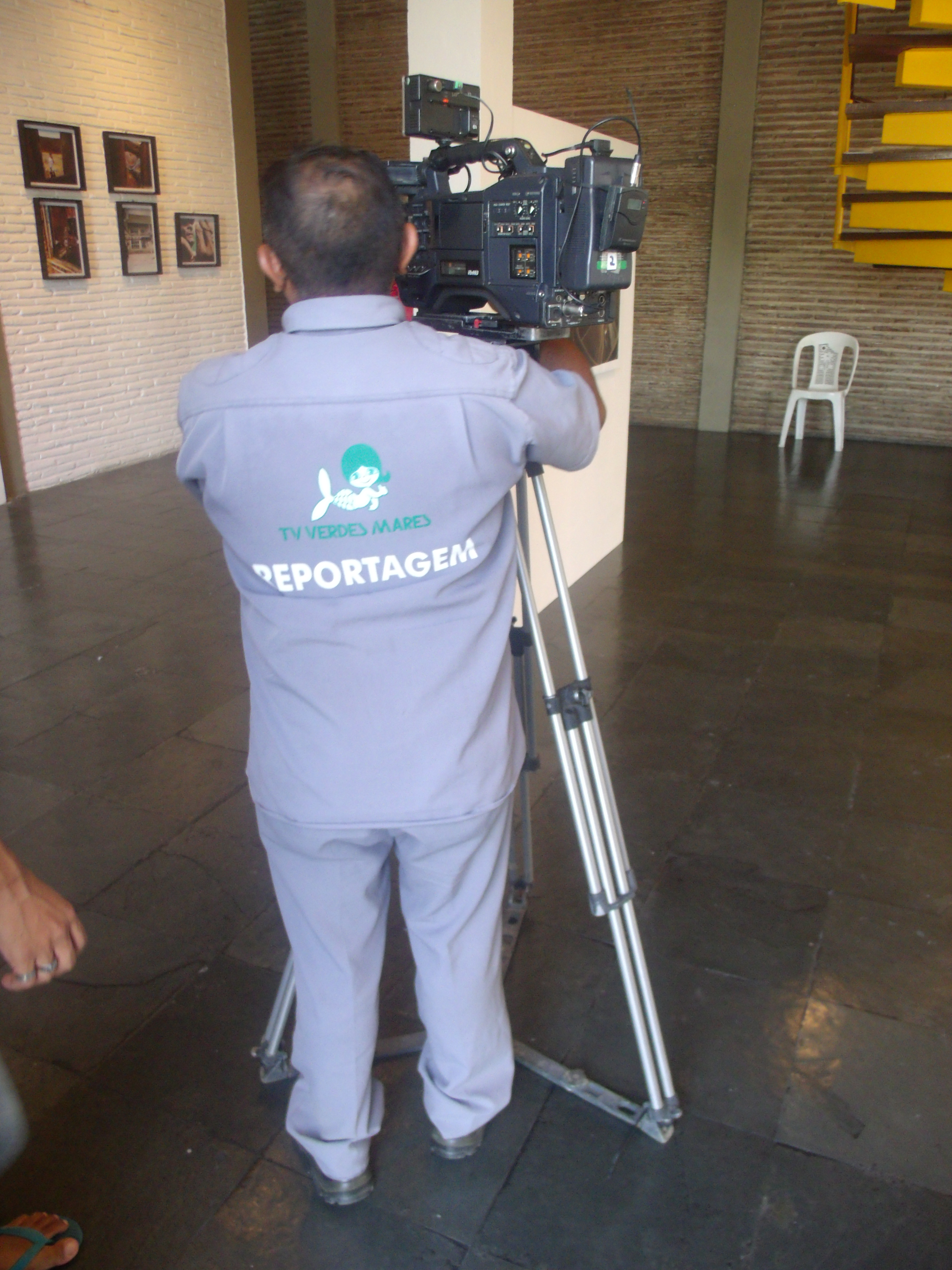
Station's cameraman inside the Casa da Cultura de Sobral, in 2019.

The logo of TV Verdes Mares is symbolized by the design of a smiling mermaid, in greenish colors, giving the thumbs up signs, with hair going to the right. The project was created by cartoonist Mino while studying law at the Federal University of Ceará, in 1970, at the request of Edson Queiroz. The inspiration for the design came through a photograph of her daughter, Agnes, when she was younger. According to him, the logo represents the station due to the mythological meaning of the figure of "attracting fishermen with its irresistible songs. The song, with all its power, is the meaning of the ratings". Over the years, the logo has undergone several modernizations, without changing its structure.

On December 5, 2008, TV Verdes Mares's logo gained three-dimensional effects, and in a new station ID, the mermaid is animated. The project was carried out by videographer Bulcão, in conjunction with the agency Slogan.

Due to its 48th anniversary, the logo receives a new typography, replacing Rede Globo's default font and using a new color gradient from the Ceará sea (50% green and 50% blue).

== Digital television ==
=== Digital channels ===
Channel	Video	Aspect	Short name	Programming
10.1	1080i	16:9	TV VERDES MARES HD	Main TV Verdes Mares programming / TV Globo

=== Analog-to-digital conversion ===
On May 11, 2009, during CETV 2ª Edição, the station officially becomes the first station in Ceará to launch the digital signal. The president of Sistema Verdes Mares, Yolanda Queiroz, signs the granting of the 33 UHF channel for digital transmission, in a ceremony held at the headquarters of the Federation of Industries of the State of Ceará (FIEC), in Fortaleza. During the night, at the headquarters of TV Verdes Mares, the president of Fundação Roberto Marinho, José Roberto Marinho, and the secretary of the Ministry of Communications, Zilda Abreu, participated in the launch of the station's digital signal.

TV Verdes Mares shut down its analog signal, over VHF channel 10, on September 27, 2017, as part of the federally mandated transition from analog to digital television. The station's digital signal remains on its pre-transition UHF channel 33, using virtual channel 10.

The station made the local generation of the match between Cruzeiro and Flamengo, valid for the Brazil Cup final, narrated by Globo's sportscaster Luís Roberto, as well as live participations from the station's master control with reporter Alana Araújo, who showed the signal being interrupted at 11:59 PM, after completion of the match, and being replaced by a notice from the Ministry of Science, Technology, Innovation and Communications (MCTIC) and ANATEL about the switch-off.

== See also ==
- TV Diário
- TV Globo
