= TV Globo Minas =

TV Globo Minas (ZYA 722)
- Belo Horizonte, Minas Gerais; Brazil
- Channels: Digital: 33 (UHF); Virtual: 12
- Branding: Globo Minas

Programming
- Affiliations: TV Globo

Ownership
- Owner: Grupo Globo; (Globo Comunicação e Participações S/A)
- Sister stations: CBN Belo Horizonte; BH FM

History
- First air date: November 1, 1961 (as TV Belo Horizonte); February 5, 1968 (as Globo Minas)
- Last air date: 1967 (as TV Belo Horizonte)
- Former names: TV Belo Horizonte (1961-1968); TV Globo Minas (1968-1976); Rede Globo Minas (1976-2021)
- Former channel numbers: Analog: 12 (VHF, 1961–2017)
- Former affiliations: TV Record (Emissoras Unidas) (1961-1968)

Technical information
- Licensing authority: ANATEL
- ERP: 18 kW
- Transmitter coordinates: 19°58′14.9″S 43°55′46.2″W

Links
- Public license information: Profile
- Website: redeglobo.globo.com/globominas

TV Globo Minas (channel 12) is a Brazilian television station based in Belo Horizonte, capital of the state of Minas Gerais, Brazil, carrying the signal of TV Globo for most of the state of Minas Gerais. Owned-and-operated by Globo, a subsidiary of Grupo Globo, its studios and offices are located in the Caiçara neighborhood, and its tower is located in Serra do Curral, in the Belvedere neighborhood.

== History ==
Channel 12 VHF in Belo Horizonte was initially occupied by TV Belo Horizonte, opened in 1963 by Rede das Emissoras Unidas, belonging to João Batista do Amaral, known as "Pipa". In 1967, with the bankruptcy his other station, TV Rio, was facing, Pipa sold the station's concession to Organizações Globo, and on February 5, 1968, TV Globo Minas was inaugurated, Rede Globo's fourth O&O, which began to take shape that same year, through integrated programming with stations from Rio de Janeiro, São Paulo and Bauru.

Its studios initially operated in a small three-story building located at Rua Rio de Janeiro, 1279, in the city center, while its transmitters, inherited from the old broadcaster, were at the top of Serra do Curral. Microwave relays had also been installed in the municipalities of Conselheiro Lafaiete and Juiz de Fora, which also formed a bridge with the network's headquarters in Rio, before Embratel's transmission trunks existed.

Over the years, TV Globo Minas expanded its signals to other municipalities in the state, until the emergence of new Globo affiliates, which continued to retransmit part of its local programming. Currently, the station's signal reaches 166 municipalities in Greater Belo Horizonte and parts of Zona da Mata and Oeste de Minas. In July 1995, the broadcaster opened its new studio complex in the Caiçara neighborhood, with 6,600 m^{2}, which replaced the facilities that the broadcaster maintained in Centro and Savassi, where its commercial offices operated.

== Technical information ==
Virtual channel	Digital channel	Aspect ratio	Content
12.1	33 UHF	1080i	Main Globo Minas programming / TV Globo

TV Globo Minas began its digital transmissions on an experimental basis on April 6, 2008, through UHF channel 33, starting to operate definitively from April 25, being the second Globo broadcaster to operate with the new technology. Its first local production in high definition was the program Terra de Minas, and on July 16, 2012, all of the station's programs began to be shown in the format.

=== Analog to digital transition ===
Globo Minas shut down its analog signal on VHF channel 12 on November 22, 2017, complying by an order from ANATEL regarding the shutdown of analog signals in Belo Horizonte.
