= São Francisco de Itabapoana =

São Francisco do Itabapoana
- Municipality
- Município de São Francisco de Itabapoana
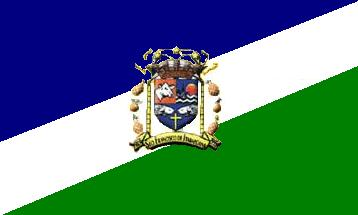
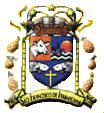
- Flag Coat of arms

- Location of São Francisco do Itabapoana in the state of Rio de Janeiro

- Location of São Francisco do Itabapoana in Brazil
- Coordinates: 21°28′12″S 41°07′08″W
- Country: Brazil
- Region: Southeast
- State: Rio de Janeiro

Government
  - Prefeito: Francimara Barbosa Lemos (PSB)

Area
  - Total: 1,122.438 km^{2} (433.376 sq mi)
- Elevation: 221 m (725 ft)

Population (2020)
  - Total: 42,210
- Time zone: UTC−3 (BRT)

São Francisco de Itabapoana (Portuguese pronunciation: [sɐ̃w fɾɐ̃ˈsisku dʒi itɐbapuˈɐ̃nɐ]) is a municipality located in the Brazilian state of Rio de Janeiro. Its population was 42,210 (2020) and its area is 1,111 km^{2}.

== See also ==
- Itabapoana River
