= TV Justiça =

Brazilian television channel

- Type: Public television
- Country: Brazil

Programming
- Picture format: 1080i HDTV (downscaled to 480i for the SD feed)

Ownership
- Owner: Brazilian Judicial Branch

History
- Launched: August 11, 2002; 22 years ago
- Founder: Brazilian Judicial Branch

Links
- Website: www.tvjustica.jus.br

Availability

Terrestrial
- Digital terrestrial television: 48 UHF (Brasília)

TV Justiça (Justice TV in Portuguese) is a Brazilian television channel owned by the Brazilian Judicial branch and administered by the Brazilian Supreme Federal Court. It was launched on August 11, 2002.

The channel is dedicated mainly to the live broadcasting of judgments in the Supreme Federal Court and the Superior Court of Justice, but there are also news, debates, movies and dictatic programmes included in its schedule.

It is available nationally on cable television and on the Internet . In the Federal District, it is also available on digital terrestrial channel 48 UHF.
