= TV Globo Rio =

Television station in Rio de Janeiro, Brazil

TV Globo Rio de Janeiro (ZYB 511)

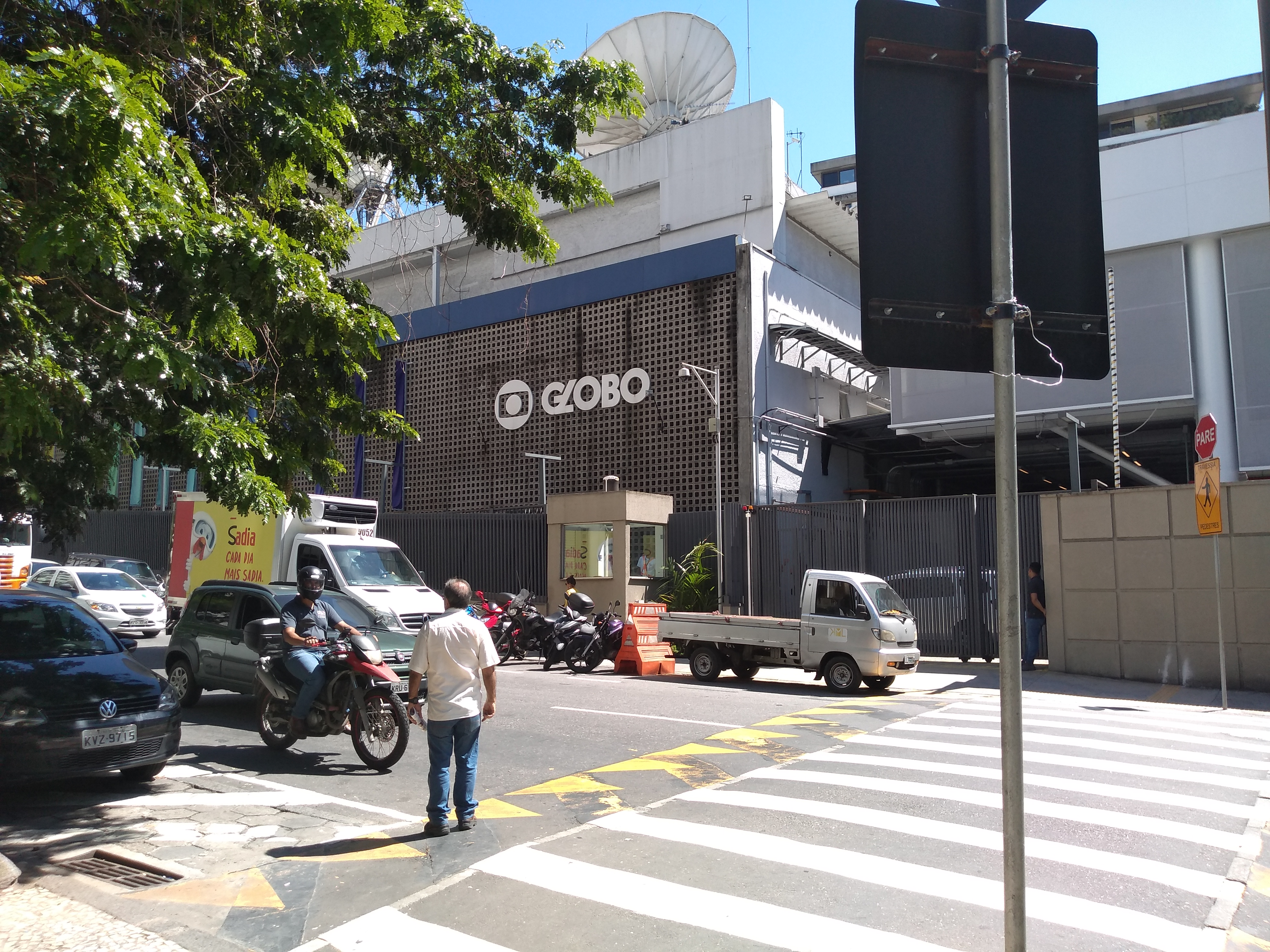
- Headquarters in Jardim Botânico, Rio de Janeiro
- Rio de Janeiro; Brazil
- Channels: Digital: 29 (UHF); Virtual: 4
- Branding: Globo Rio

Programming
- Affiliations: TV Globo

Ownership
- Owner: Grupo Globo; (Globo Comunicação e Participações S/A)
- Sister stations: Rádio Globo; CBN Rio de Janeiro

History
- First air date: April 26, 1965
- Former names: TV Globo (1965-1976); Rede Globo Rio de Janeiro (1976-2021)
- Former channel numbers: Analog: 4 (VHF, 1965-2017)

Technical information
- Licensing authority: ANATEL
- ERP: 18 kW
- Transmitter coordinates: 22°57′6.2″S 43°14′14.1″W

Links
- Public license information: Profile
- Website: redeglobo.globo.com/rio

TV Globo Rio de Janeiro (channel 4, also known as TV Globo Rio) is a Brazilian television station located in Rio de Janeiro, Brazil serving as the flagship station of the TV Globo network. Owned-and-operated by Globo a subsidiary of locally based Grupo Globo, the station's news facilities are located in Jardim Botânico while their other facility, shared with SporTV are located in Barra da Tijuca and their studios in Curicica are used as a hub for Estúdios Globo, the company's production banner. Their transmitters are located in the Morro do Sumaré mountains with repeater transmitters across their coverage area.

== History ==
In July 1957, the president of the republic Juscelino Kubitschek approved a TV concession for Rádio Globo and, on December 30 of the same year, the National Telecommunications Council (today Anatel) published a decree granting channel 4 in Rio de Janeiro to TV Globo Ltda. From then until 1965, Rádio Globo organized itself for the inauguration of TV Globo.

On April 26, 1965, at 10:30 am, the Brazilian National Anthem was played. Soon after, the president of Organizações Globo, Roberto Marinho, presented the new broadcaster to viewers in the city of Rio de Janeiro and the State of Guanabara and Cardinal Archbishop Dom Jaime de Barros Câmara blessed the broadcaster's studios. At 11 am, the program Úni Dúni Tê, adapted from the American format Romper Room was shown, with Tia Fernanda and at noon, some cartoons aired, Felix the Cat, Wally Gator, Touché Turtle and Dum Dum, Ruff and Reddy and The Mighty Hercules.

At 5pm in the afternoon, Clube do Capitão Furacão premiered, presented by Pietro Mário Bongiancchini, then 26 years old, where, in addition to stories told by Pietro, there were jokes, games and the premiere of the series Superman and The Three Stooges and also the cartoons Magilla Gorilla and Punkin' Puss & Mushmouse.

Later that day, TV Globo premiered its first teledramaturgy work, Rua da Matriz, at 7pm, which brought the novelty of presenting complete stories in five chapters, shown from Monday to Friday, with a hitherto unknown cast from TV Globo. television audience, among others Lafayette Galvão, Iracema de Alencar, Milton Gonçalves and the direction of Graça Mello and Moysés Weltman. Later, at 10pm, TV Globo in Rio de Janeiro also premiered its first soap opera, Ilusões Perdidas, directed by Líbero Miguel and Sérgio Britto, with a cast acting for the first time on television: Reginaldo Farias, Leila Diniz, Miriam Pires, Osmar Prado and also the participation of Norma Blum and Zilka Salaberry hired from TV Tupi Rio de Janeiro, where they participated in Teatrinho Trol on Sunday afternoons.

That first week, musical programs also debuted with Darlene Glória and the duo Cyl Farney and Dick Farney; the humorous program TNT, with Betty Faria and Márcia de Windsor; The Treasure Hunt, presented by Walter Forster, in which guests had to discover in a model of Rio de Janeiro where the production had hidden the chest with the treasure, through tips about that particular location; Who is who? presented by Célia Biar, when the guests had to discover among the three participants which one spoke the truth in relation to having a certain profession, and TV Ó canal zero and TV 1 canal meio, with Agildo Ribeiro and Paulo Silvino, all from cinema, without having done any work until then for television, and Câmera Indiscreta, the latter a national version adapted from the American original directed by Mauro Salles, Maurício Dantas and Roberto Farias, shown on Wednesdays, at 7:15 pm, presented by Renato Consorte and the "cara de pau" journalist and comedian José Martins de Araújo Jr., and a news program presented by Hilton Gomes, Tele Globo, the embryo of Jornal Nacional.

On Sunday afternoons, Globo premiered Jonny Quest and the British supermarionation series, Thunderbirds, in the first week, both of which achieved great success among children at the time. TV Globo also showed the program Show da Noite, presented by theater author Gláucio Gil, who died in front of the cameras on his program on August 13, 1965, ten minutes after the introduction, when he said the text: "Today is Friday - Friday, August 13th. Bad day. But so far everything is going well, fortunately." This episode gave the station a macabre reputation in the media at the time.

This first phase of Globo was also responsible for the launch in Brazil of American series such as: Bewitched, The Beverly Hillbillies, The Munsters, A Ilha dos Birutas, The Travels of Jaimie McPheeters, Mister Ed, Ben Casey, I Dream of Jeannie and Batman. At that time, Globo also included feature film sessions presented by famous actors, such as Romance na Tarde, presented by Norma Blum, Sessão das Dez, presented by Célia Biar, and later, in 1967, Sessão da Meia Noite, presented by Augusto César Vanucci.

Another program shown first-hand in this first phase of the network was the series produced as a film by Herbert Richers in partnership with the newspaper O Globo, 22-2000 Cidade Aberta, featuring Jardel Filho in the role of a reporter who helped the police solve complicated cases, a character taken from the film Paraíba, Life and Death of a Bandit.

== Technical information ==
=== Subchannels ===
Channel	Video	Aspect	Short name	Programming
4.1	1080i HDTV; 2160p UHDTV	16:9	TV Globo	Main TV Globo Rio programming / TV Globo

On June 16, 2008, the station started broadcasting in HD in Rio de Janeiro and surrounding areas. As of 2013, all of the network's news programs are filmed in widescreen.

=== Analog-to-digital conversion ===
Globo Rio discontinued its analog signal over VHF channel 4, on November 22, 2017, complying an order by ANATEL regarding the shutdown of analog television in Rio de Janeiro.

=== DTV+ ===
TV Globo Rio was the first station to activate the DTV+ pilot service in some neighborhoods in Rio de Janeiro on April 29, 2025. The goal is to formally launch the service ahead of the 2026 FIFA World Cup.
