= TV Senado =

Brazilian legislative television network

- Type: Free-to-air television channel
- Country: Brazil

Programming
- Language: Portuguese
- Picture format: HDTV 1080i (downscaled to 480i for the SD feed)

Ownership
- Owner: Brazilian Senate

History
- Launched: 5 February 1996

Links
- Website: senado.gov.br/tv

Availability

Terrestrial
- Digital terrestrial television: 50 UHF (Brasília)

YouTube information
- Channel: TV Senado
- Years active: 2010–present
- Genre: Politics
- Subscribers: 764 thousand
- Views: 117 million
- Last updated: 19 May 2021

TV Senado (Portuguese for Senate TV) is a Brazilian television network responsible for broadcasting activity from the Brazilian Senate. It was created in 1996 by the Brazilian Senate. The channel broadcasts 24h from the Senate.

TV Senado broadcasts on YouTube, on its own channel started in December 2010. During the impeachment of Dilma Rousseff and her subsequent removal from office in late 2016, the channel surpassed 100 thousand subscribers, for which they later received the Silver Play Button. The channel surpassed 500 thousand subscribers in March 2020.

Public interest for TV Senado went up again after the start of the COVID-19 CPI, an investigation on omissions and irregularities in federal government spending during the COVID-19 pandemic in Brazil. As of May 2021, the channel has over 760 thousand subscribers.
