= TV Câmara =

Brazilian legislative television network

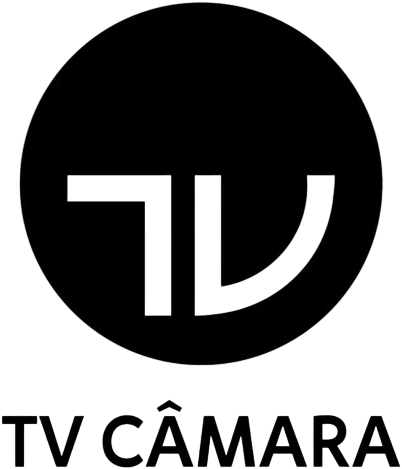
- Type: Public television
- Country: Brazil

Programming
- Picture format: 1080i HDTV (downscaled to 480i for the SD feed)

Ownership
- Owner: Brazilian Chamber of Deputies

History
- Launched: January 20, 1998; 27 years ago
- Founder: Brazilian Chamber of Deputies

Links
- Website: www.camara.leg.br/tv

Availability

Terrestrial
- Digital terrestrial television: 49 UHF (Brasília)

TV Câmara (Portuguese: Chamber TV) is a Brazilian public television network responsible for broadcasting activities from the Brazilian Chamber of Deputies. Created in 1998, it broadcasts 24 hours a day from the Chamber.

== Censorship ==
In March 2009, Chamber President Michel Temer, at the request of Renato Parente, head of the Supreme Federal Court's press service, ordered the removal from TV Câmara's website of a debate in which CartaCapital journalist Leandro Fortes criticized Gilmar Mendes' tenure as Court President. Many viewed this episode as political censorship and the video was soon posted on YouTube. After being denounced of censorship by the country's main bodies representative of journalists, TV Câmara put the debate back on its website.
