= Jerusalem stone =

Type of pale building stone

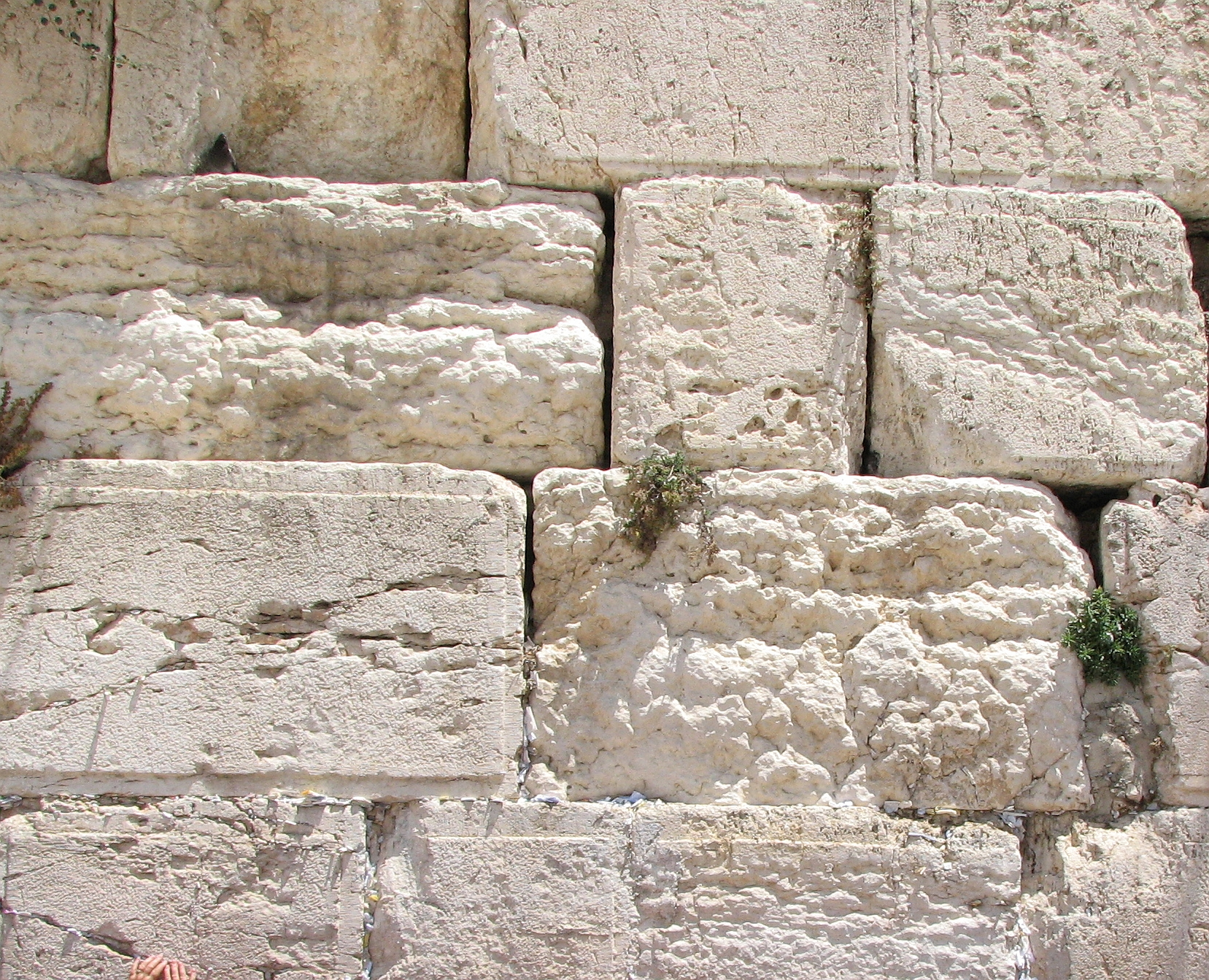
Jerusalem stone (Western Wall, Jerusalem)

Jerusalem stone (Hebrew: אבן ירושלמית, romanized: ʾeḇen yərūšalmīṯ; Arabic: حجر القدس, romanized: ḥajar al-Quds) is a name applied to various types of pale limestone, dolomite and dolomitic limestone, common in and around Jerusalem that have been used in building since ancient times. One of these limestones, meleke, has been used in many of the region's most celebrated structures, including the Western Wall.

Jerusalem stone continues to be used in construction and incorporated in Jewish ceremonial art such as menorahs and seder plates.

== Geology ==
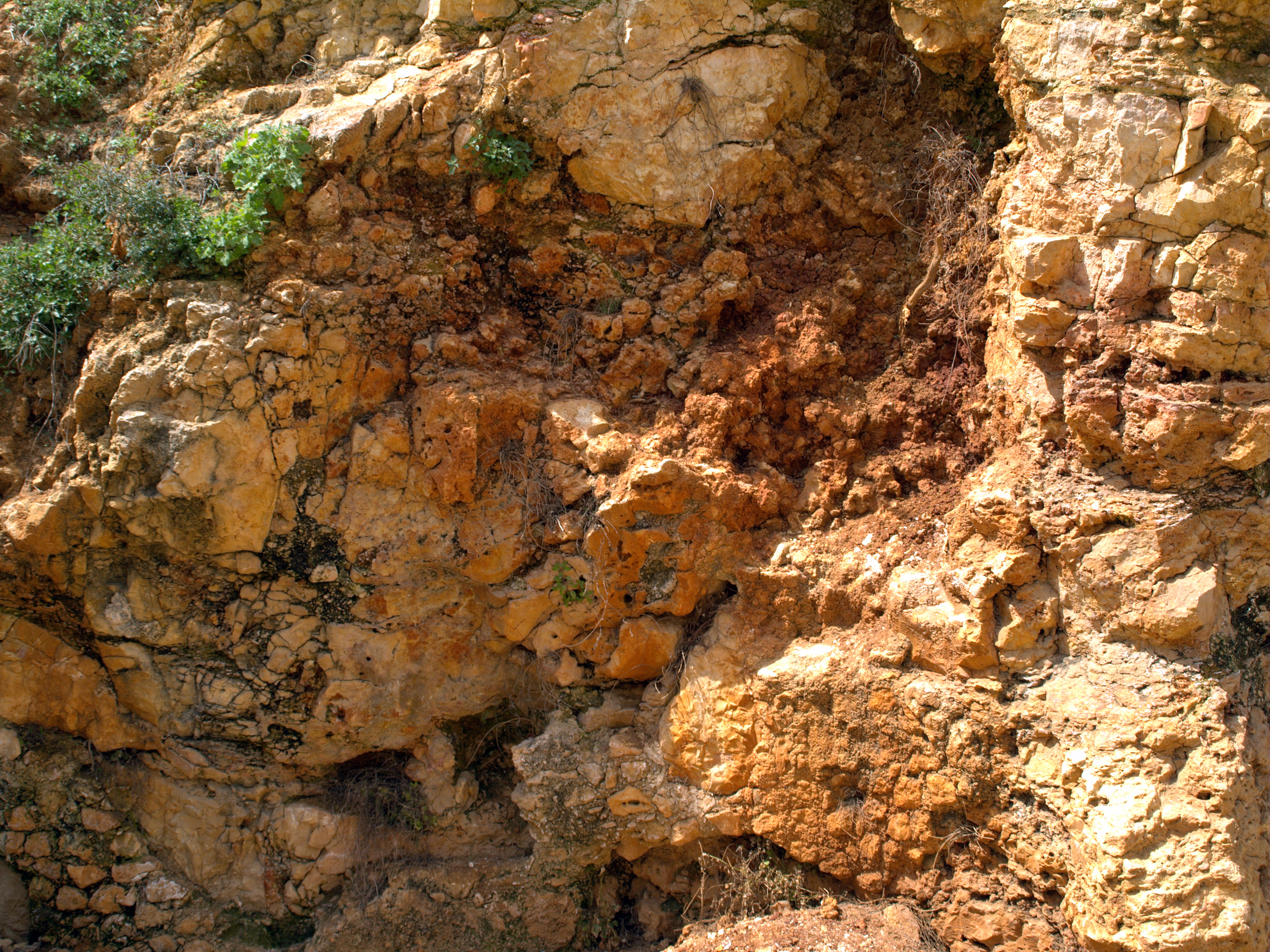
The stone in its natural state

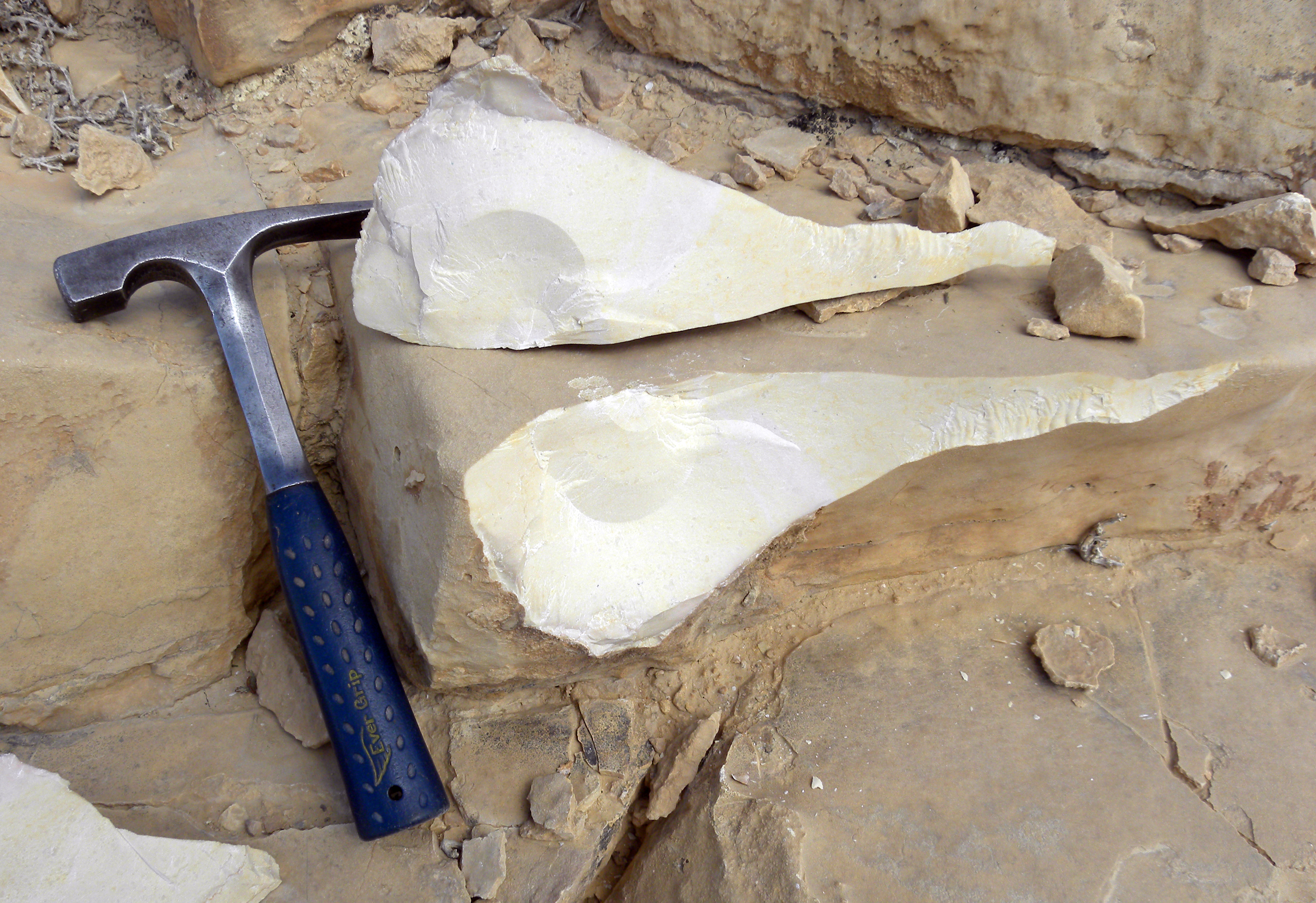
Lithographic limestone from the Gerofit Formation (Turonian) north of Makhtesh Ramon, southern Israel; a variety of Jerusalem Stone (meleke)

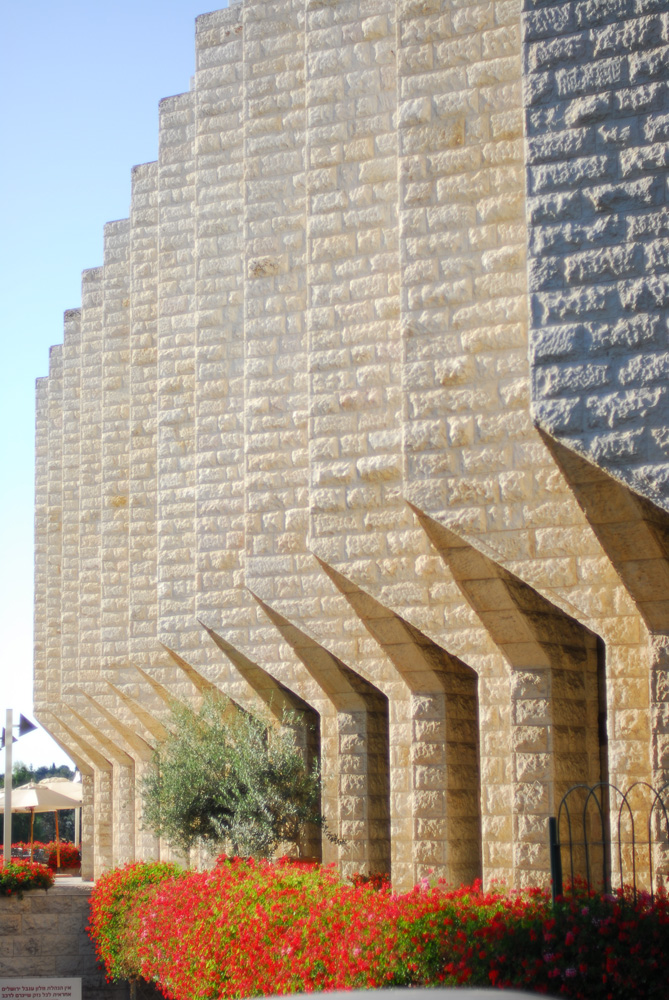
Jerusalem stone facade of Inbal Jerusalem Hotel in Jerusalem

The highlands of Israel and Palestine are primarily underlain by sedimentary limestone, dolomite and dolomitic limestone. The stone quarried for building purposes, ranging in color from white to pink, yellow and tawny, is known collectively as Jerusalem stone. Soft Senonian limestone is found to the east of Jerusalem, and has long been used as an inexpensive building material. Stone of the Cenomanian layers, known in Arabic as mizzi ahmar and mizzi yahudi, is far more durable than Senonian limestone, but is very hard and was expensive to quarry using pre-modern methods. Turonian layers yield mizzi hilu or helu and meleke, the most prized building stones. The thin layered mizzi hilu is easily quarried and worked. Meleke is soft and easy to chisel, yet hardens with exposure to the atmosphere and becomes highly durable. It was used for the great public buildings of antiquity, and for the construction of the Western Wall.

== Varieties ==
The mountains in and around Jerusalem offer mainly limestone, dolomite and related types of rock. The names in common use today have been adopted from the Arab masons of the 19th and 20th centuries. The varieties mostly used for building throughout history are:

- Meleke, the "royal" stone, a white, coarse crystalline limestone used for representative buildings like the Western Wall and possibly other parts of the Herodian Temple. It is easy to quarry, but once it is exposed to air it hardens and develops a pleasant yellow hue.
- Mizzi hilu ("sweet stone") is a hard whitish micritic limestone, usually covering beds of meleke. It is a high quality building stone, but in times when the "royal stone" was preferred, the mizzi hilu was left as a roof over the cavities created by quarrying the meleke.
- Mizzi ahmar ("red stone"), a hard dolomitic limestone, light-colored with reddish bands. In Jerusalem it was used for ablaq-style multi-colored masonry by the Mamluks.
- Mizzi yahudi ("Jewish stone"), a dark grey or yellow crystalline dolomite or dolomitic limestone, appreciated for its hardness which makes it an excellent building material.
- Deir yassini is a variety of mizzi named after the village of Deir Yassin. A reddish dolomitic limestone, it is quarried in slabs used for floor and roof tiles.
- Mizzi akhdar is a decorative green limestone quarried on a smaller scale. Its high density means that it can be finely polished. At the beginning of the 20th century, it was five times more expensive than other varieties of mizzi.
- Kakuleh or kakula, a soft and light chalky limestone found on the Mount of Olives. Due to its softness it was favoured during the Late Second Temple Period for carving box-shaped ossuaries for secondary burials as well as for producing stone vessels, using a procedure similar to the potter's wheel. These vessels were considered by strictly observant Jews to always be ritually pure.
- Nari is the other softer type of stone used in the Jerusalem area. It is the whitish caliche crust which develops through chemical processes on top of chalk or marl. Light, friable and far from homogeneous, it is not a resilient building material, but these very qualities attracted masons of the early Kingdom of Judah who cut it into ashlars.

The setting sun reflected on the cream-colored limestone facade of both ancient and modern structures gives them a golden hue, giving rise to the term "Jerusalem of Gold".

== History ==
According to Israeli geologist Ithamar Perath, residents of Jerusalem in antiquity built their homes from Jerusalem stone quarried in the city and used the pit that remained as a cistern to collect rainwater beneath the home. Ancient quarries in Jerusalem include locations that are now the East Jerusalem Central Bus Station, Rehov Hamadregot in Nahlaot, and the Garden Tomb. The remains of ancient quarries can also be seen near Yemin Moshe, in the Sanhedria neighborhood, and elsewhere.

Municipal laws in Jerusalem require that all buildings be faced with local Jerusalem stone. The ordinance dates back to the British Mandate and the military governorship of Ronald Storrs, who issued the requirement in 1918. It was originally part of the city master plan drawn up in 1918 by William McLean, who had been city engineer of Alexandria at that time. It was noted that that requirement to use Jerusalem stone in new construction had limited the damage caused by the shelling in the Battle for Jerusalem during the 1948 Palestine war.

Aharon Grebelsky established the country's first Jewish-owned quarry in Jerusalem in 1923. His son Yechiel expanded the business to employ more than 100 workers, including quarriers, stonemasons, fabricators and installers. The company inaugurated a new factory in Mitzpe Ramon in January 2000. There were 650 stone-cutting enterprises run by Palestinians in the West Bank as of 2000, producing a varied range of pink, sand, golden, and off-white bricks and tiles.

== Symbolic use ==
The various "Jerusalem stones" are employed abroad in Jewish buildings as a symbol of Jewish identity. It has been used this way in many Jewish community centers, including the one in San Jose, Costa Rica. Jerusalem stone is frequently used in contemporary synagogue design, to create a simulation of the Western Wall or as a backdrop for the Holy Ark.

A Pentecostal church in São Paulo, Brazil, ordered $8 million worth of Jerusalem stone to construct a replica of the Temple of Solomon, or Templo de Salomão that stands 180 feet (55 m) tall.

== See also ==
- Limepit
- List of types of limestone
- Sydney sandstone
- Tennessee marble
