= Hamburg temple model =

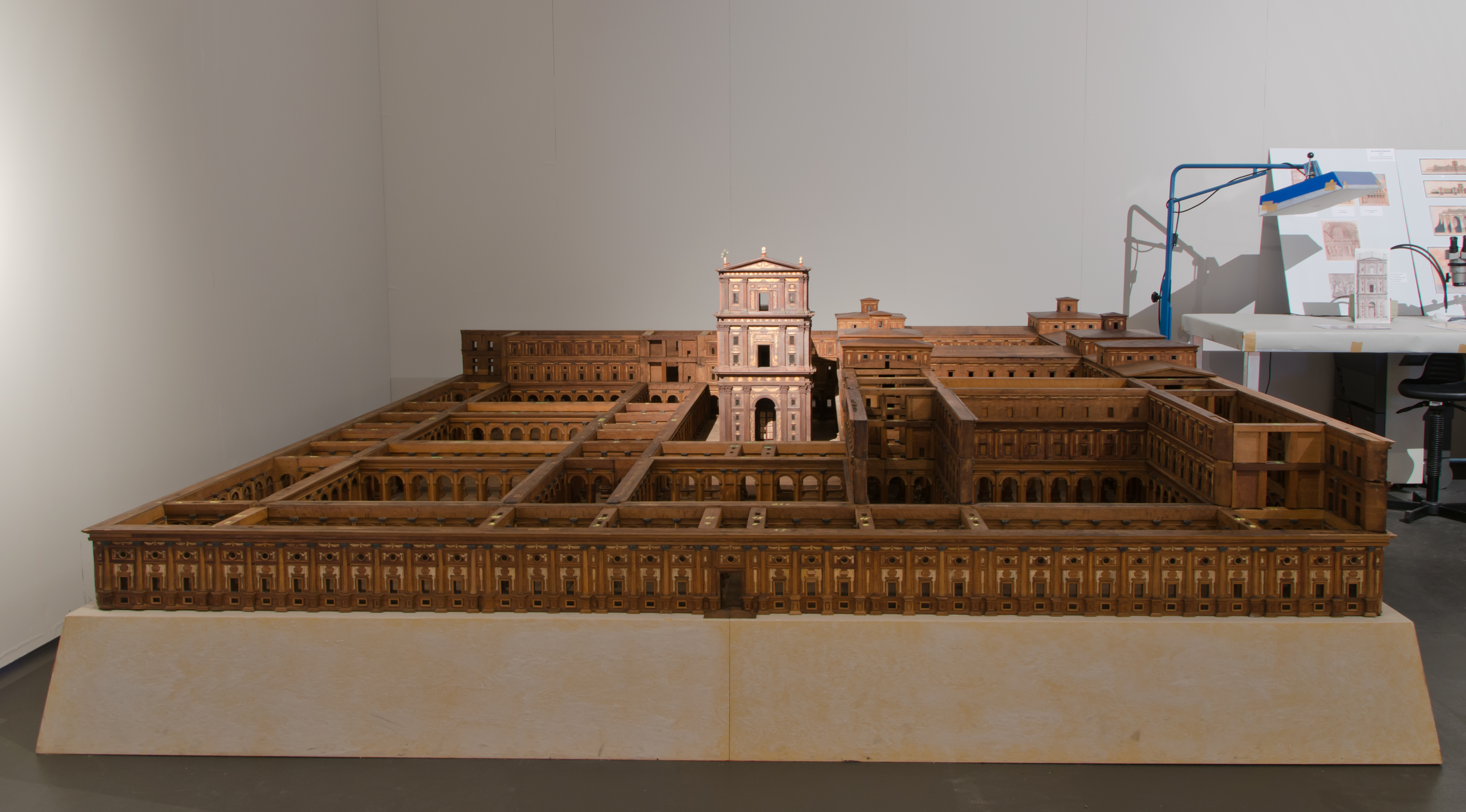
Overview of the Hamburg Temple Model

The Hamburg temple model is an architectural model of the Temple of Solomon in the Baroque style currently located at the Hamburg Museum. It covers an area of about 12 square metres (130 sq ft) and is made from wood. It is square, with four wings and nine courtyards, two of them in the central axis.

It was made somewhere between 1692 and 1698 after being commissioned by the Hamburg senator and founder and director of the Oper am Gänsemarkt (a forerunner of the Hamburg Opera) Gerhard Schott (1641-1702).

Schott's model is in the tradition of many Renaissance and Baroque attempts at reconstruction of the temple by theological and architectural scholars. The Hamburg-based model closely follows an interpretation by the Spanish Jesuit Juan Bautista Villalpando in 1604, in turn, based on the Third Temple described in the Book of Ezekiel.

The reason the expensive and complex model was commissioned is unknown but one theory is that the model was constructed in preparation for building the set of a 1692 opera in two parts titled "The Destruction of Jerusalem" with a libretto by Christian Heinrich Postel.

The model was first exhibited at the Opera. After Schott's death, his heirs put the model up for sale. It was brought to London and eventually sold to an Englishman, allegedly in 1717, who put it on display there from 1724 to 1731. In 1732, it was acquired by an agent of Frederick Augustus I who was the Elector of Saxony, as well as and King of Poland. The model was taken to Dresden, where it was shown as part of the collection of Jewish ceremonial art. After the restructuring of this collection in the early 19th Century the model had several owners, before being acquired by the Hamburg Museum in 1910.

The temple model has been restored several times throughout its history. During the last restoration campaign, completed in 2015, it turned out to be particularly difficult that earlier measures had used highly toxic wood preservatives, so extensive protective measures had to be taken for restorers and museum visitors.

== Gallery ==
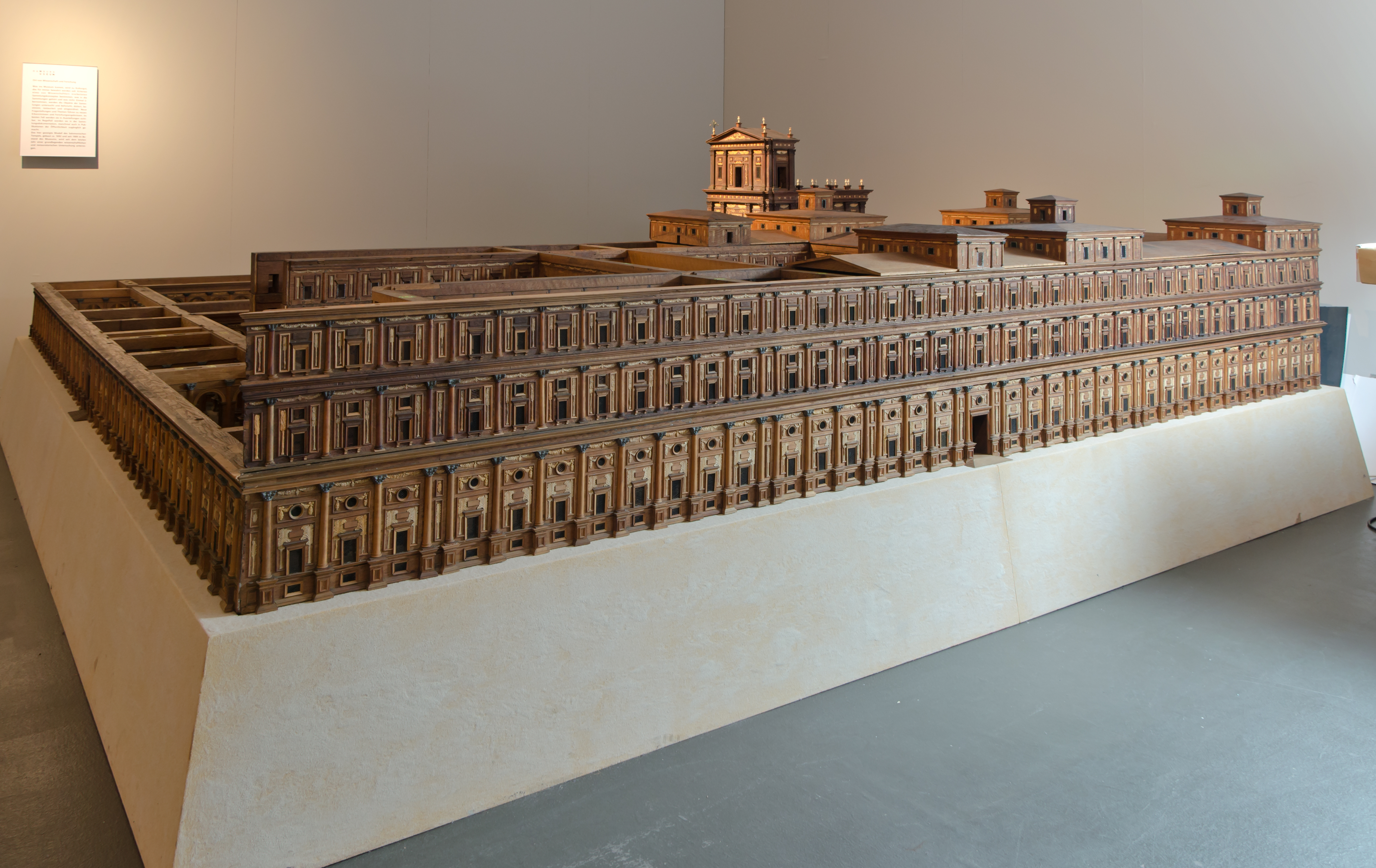
The full model

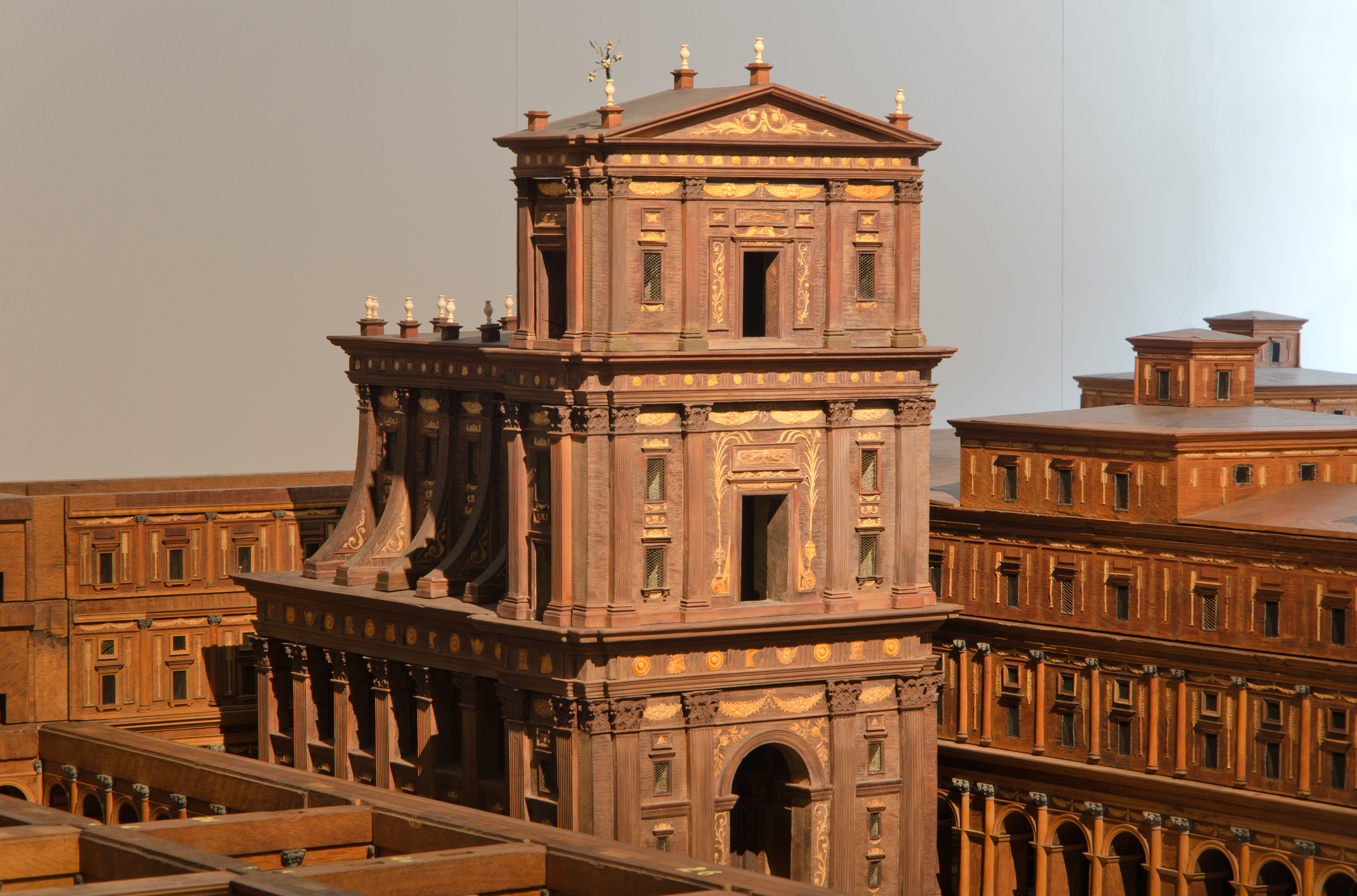
Detail of the Sanctuary of the temple

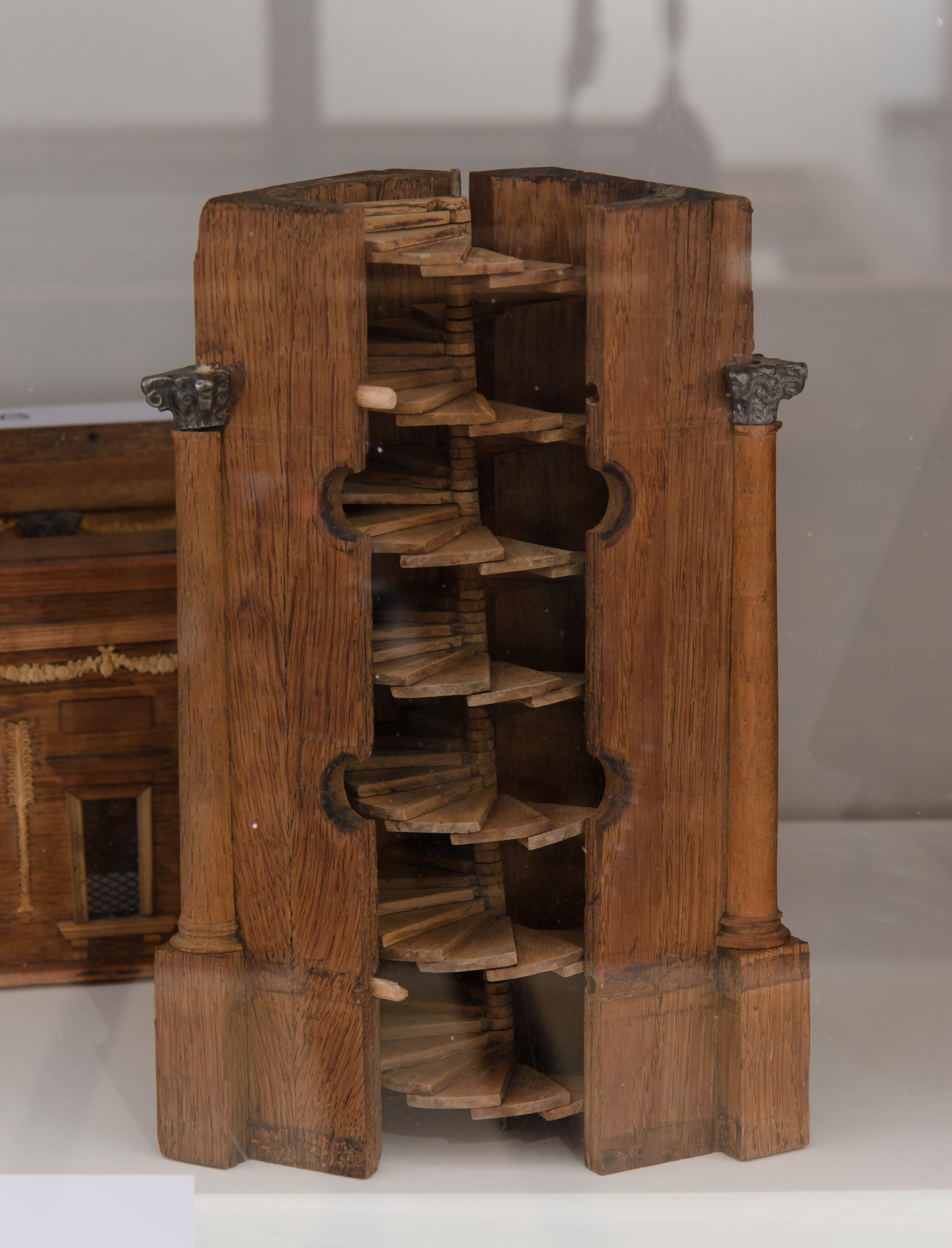
Detail of a staircase

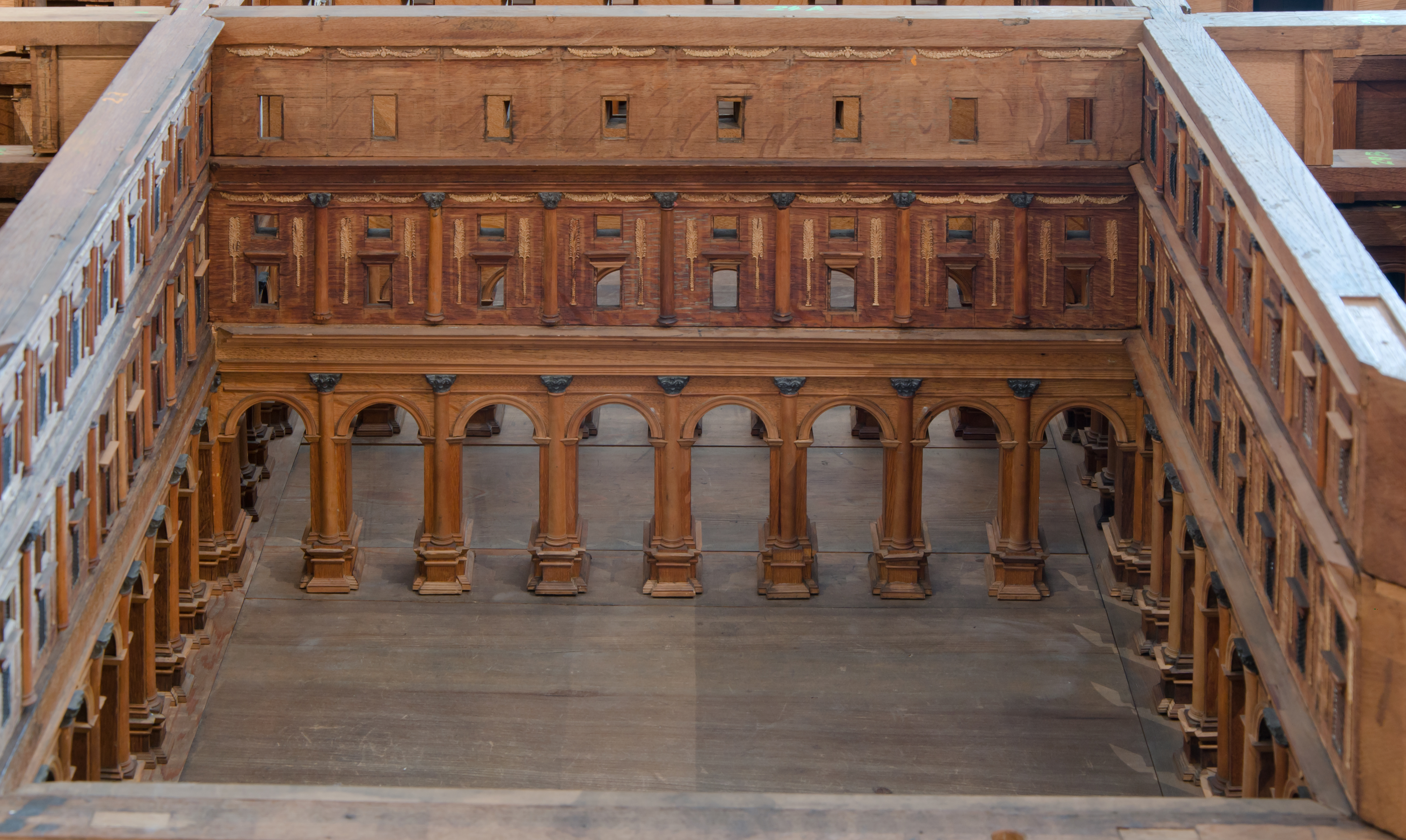
Detail of the inner yard of the temple

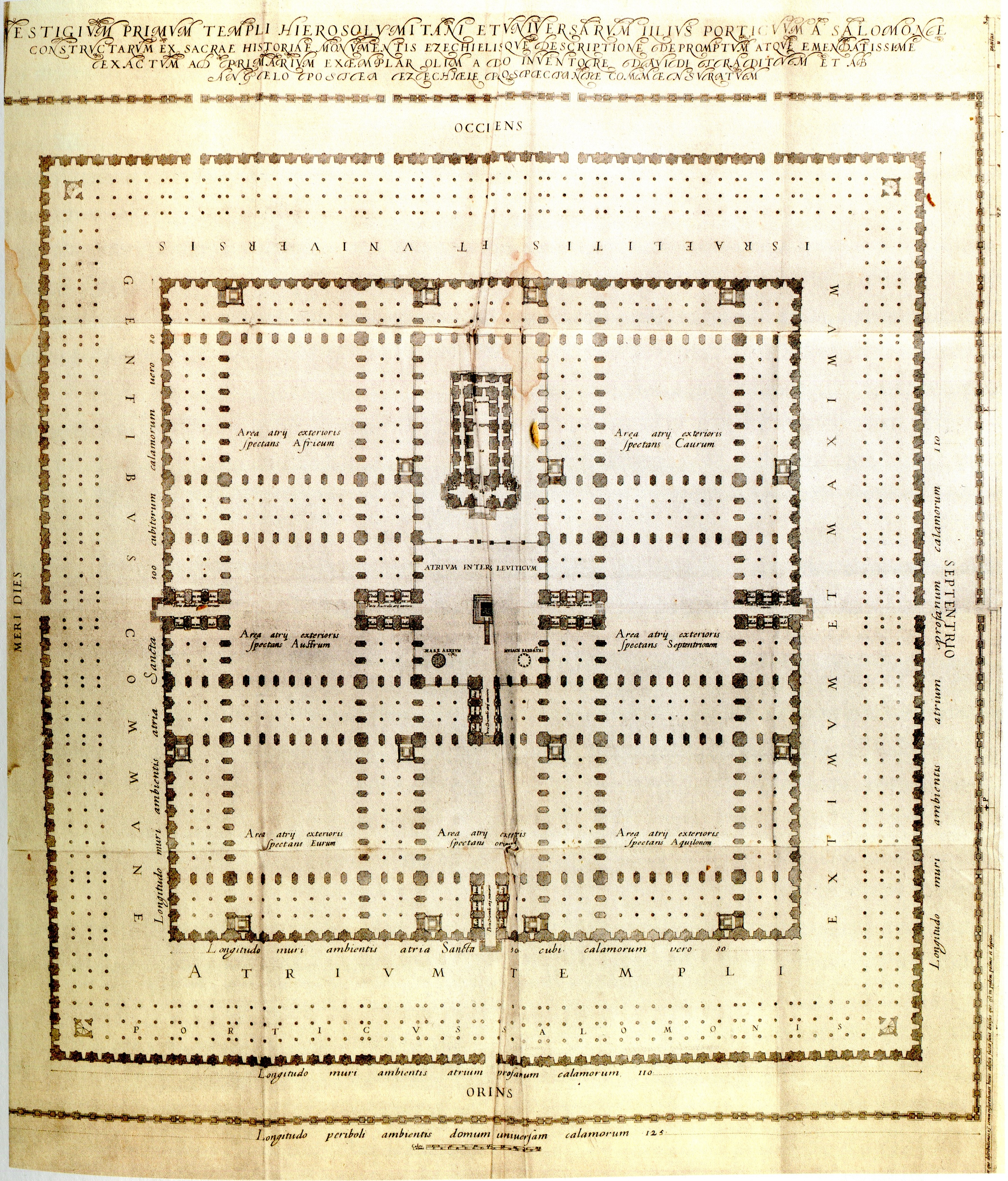
The floor plan of the Hamburg model corresponds to the temple plan made by Juan Bautista Villalpando in Ezechielem Explanationes (1604).
