= Replicas of the Jewish Temple =

Replica buildings

Replicas of the Jewish Temple are scale models or authentic buildings that attempt to replicate either the Temple of Solomon or the Second Temple (Herod's Temple) in Jerusalem.

Sources for the description of the Temple are found primarily in the works of Josephus, tractate Middot and the Temple Scroll; however, these sources are not consistent.

== Scale models ==
=== Judah Leon model ===
In the seventeenth century, Rabbi Jacob Judah Leon of Amsterdam (1602–1675) built a widely exhibited model of the Temple based on his understanding of the biblical specifications.

=== Schott model ===
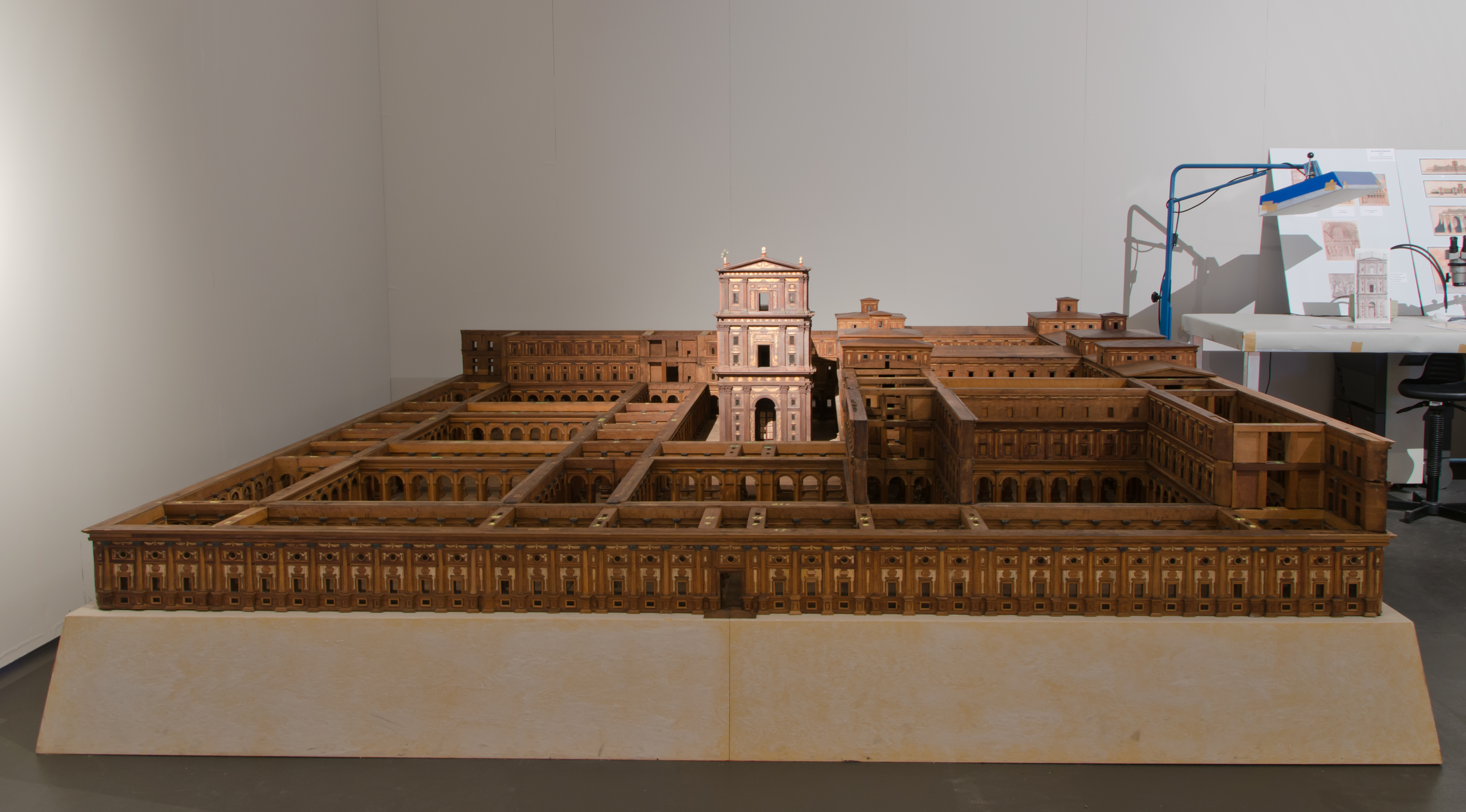
The Hamburg temple model

Another notable model was constructed by Gerhard Schott (1641–1702), follows an interpretation made by the Spanish Jesuit Juan Bautista Villalpando. Schott's model, known as the Hamburg temple model, is still displayed in the Museum for Hamburg History.

=== Conrad Schick models ===
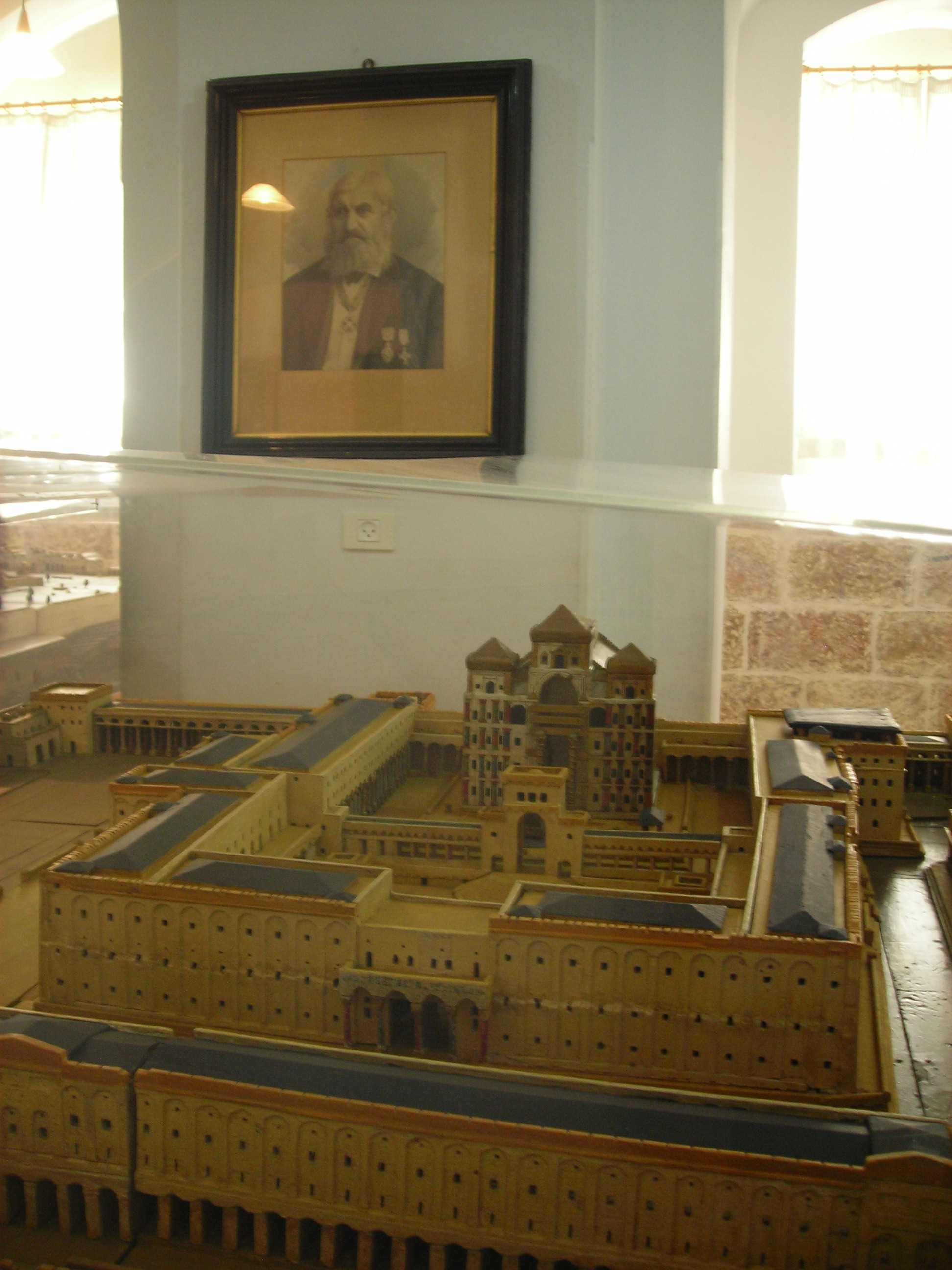
Portrait of Conrad Schick and his model of the Jewish temple

Conrad Schick constructed a series of replicas of the Jewish Temple. His replica of the Biblical Tabernacle was visited in Jerusalem by several crowned heads of state, toured the United Kingdom, and was exhibited at the 1873 Vienna World's Fair. It was purchased by the King of Württemberg, who awarded Schick a knighthood in recognition of his work. Schick built a replica of the contemporary Temple Mount and Dome of the Rock for the Ottoman Sultan. His final model, in four sections, each representing the Temple Mount as it appeared in a particular era, was exhibited at the St. Louis World's Fair of 1904.

A scale model existed at the Chachmei Lublin Yeshiva, but was destroyed during World War II. Two of Schick's models are located in the basement of the Schmidt school for girls in east Jerusalem, near the Damascus Gate.

Another of Schick's models is at the Bijbels Museum ("Biblical Museum") in Amsterdam.

=== Avi-Yonah model ===
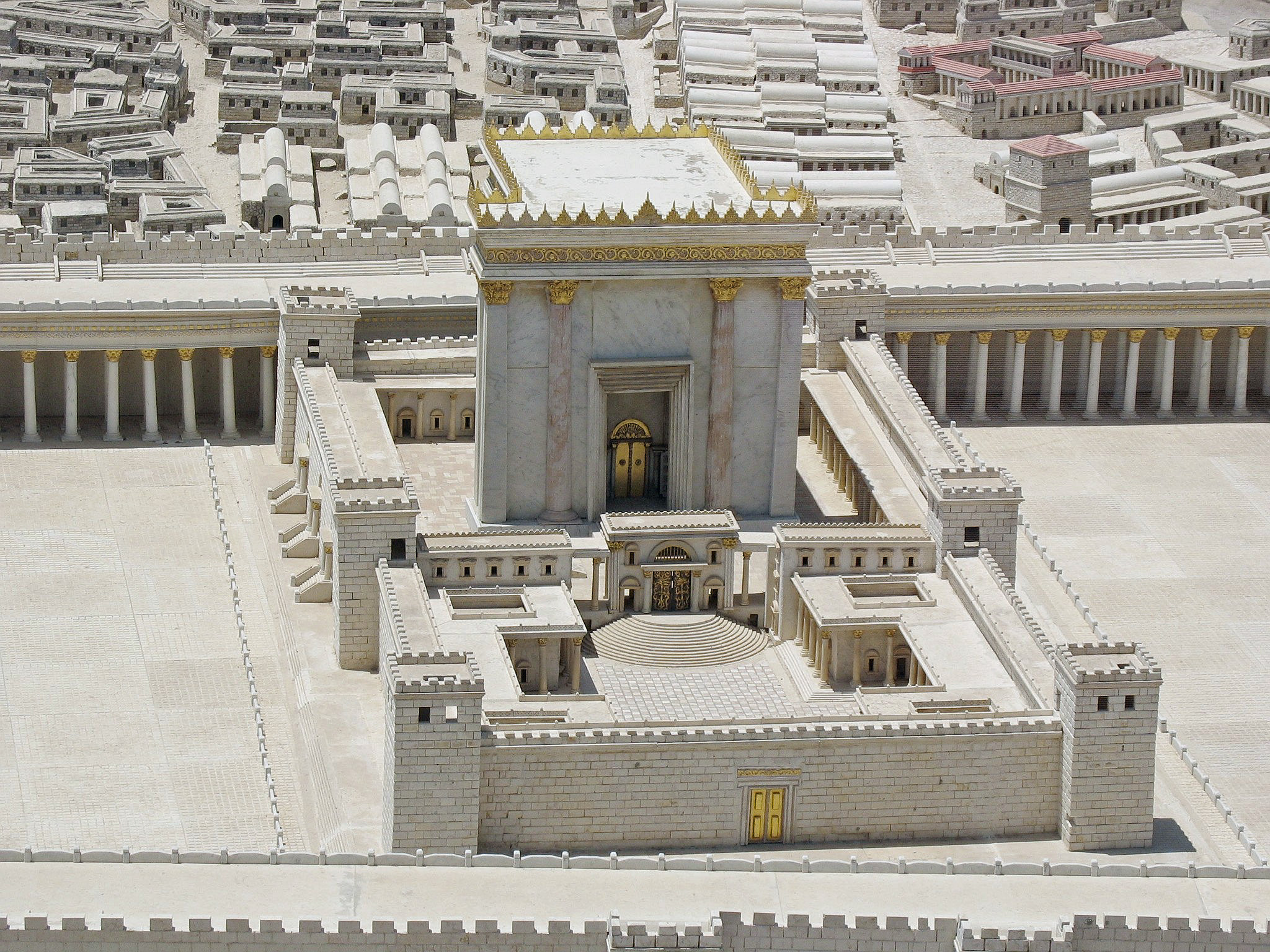
Herod's Temple as imagined in the Holyland Model of Jerusalem.

The Israel Museum in Jerusalem houses the Holyland Model of Jerusalem, a model of Jerusalem in the Late 2nd Temple Period originally constructed by archeologist Michael Avi-Yonah at the Holyland hotel.

=== Other models ===
- Yeshiva University Museum in Manhattan has models by archaeological architect Leen Ritmeyer.
- The North Visitors' Center at Temple Square, in Salt Lake City, Utah, has a scale model of Jerusalem as it may have looked at the time of Christ.
- Alec Garrard of Norfolk, UK, worked for 30 years creating a 1:100 scale model of Herod's Temple.
- The Holy Land Experience, an Evangelical amusement park in Orlando, Florida featured a large replica of Herod's Temple inside the walls of a replica of the Jerusalem of Jesus' day.

== Building-sized replicas of the Temple ==
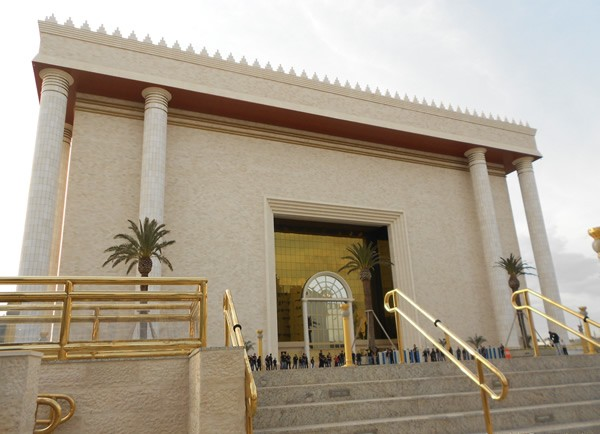
The Temple of Solomon in São Paulo

In 2009, Jews in the Israeli settlement of Mitzpe Yeriho in the West Bank began building a life-size replica of the Temple of Jerusalem.

In 2010 the Universal Church of the Kingdom of God started the construction of a replica of Solomon's temple in São Paulo, Brazil. According to local press reports, the building would be an "exact replica" of the ancient Temple of Solomon, but with increased dimensions, despite resembling considerably more Herod's Temple. The temple was inaugurated in July 2014. The mega-church seats 10,000 worshipers and stands 180 feet tall, the height of an 18-story building.

== Buildings evoking the Temple ==
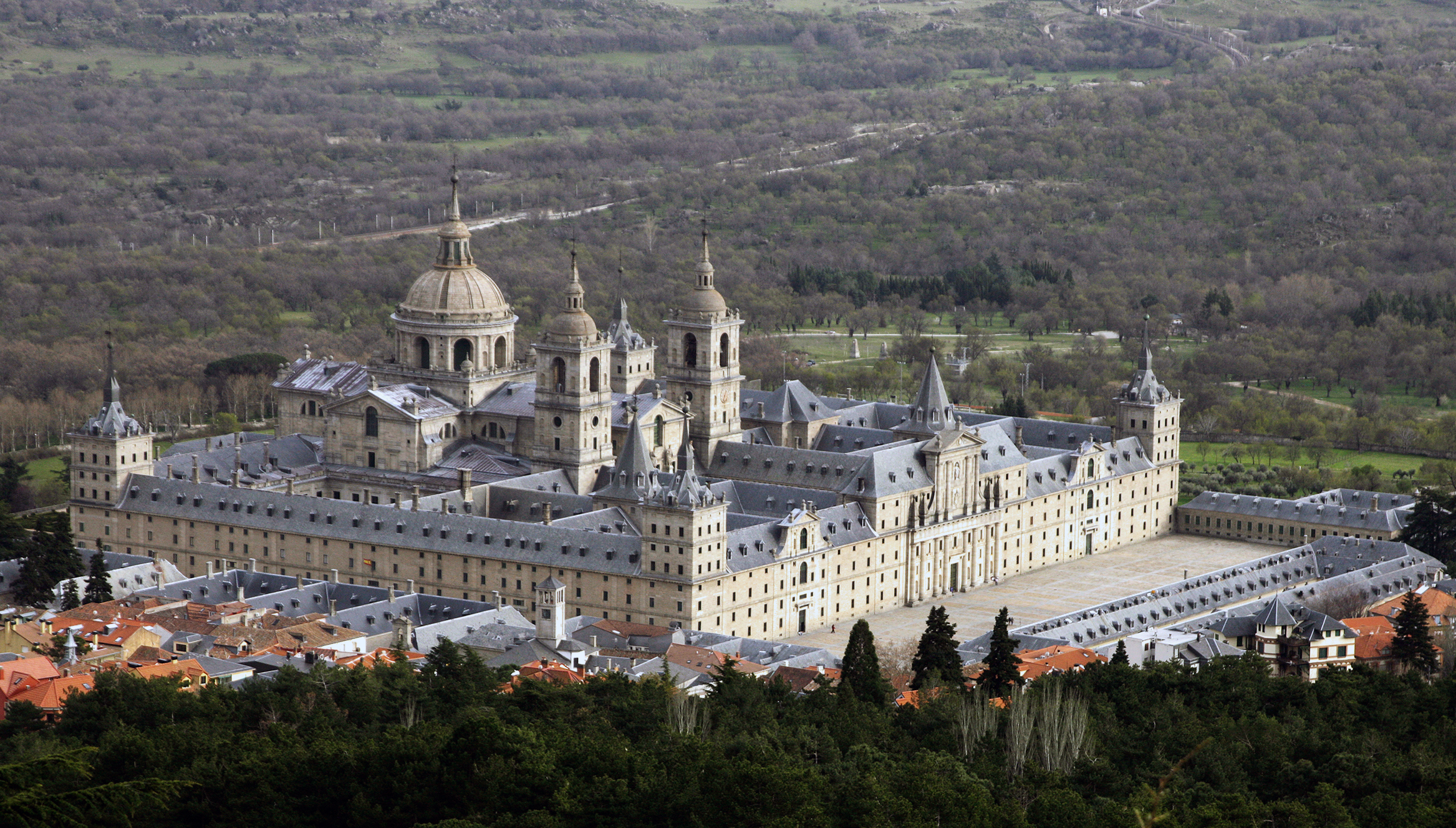
El Escorial, Spain, was constructed from a plan based on the descriptions of Solomon's temple.

Several churches and synagogues have been designed to evoke the Temple. The most famous of them is el Escorial, the royal residence of Spain (1563–1584) by architect Juan Bautista de Toledo under the order of Philip II of Spain. The central axis reveals a pattern of an courtyard, a sanctuary, and the Holy of Holies.

The Old Whalers Church in Sag Harbor, New York was built in 1844 by architect Minard Lafever as a replica of the Temple.

The 1906 building of Temple Israel in Boston was intended to be a replica of the Temple. The Church of St. Polyeuctus in Constantinople was built with the precise proportions given in the Bible for the Temple.

The 1909 building of the Herzliya Hebrew Gymnasium in Tel Aviv, designed by Joseph Barsky, was intended to evoke the Temple following a widely-circulated reconstruction of the temple by Charles Chipiez.

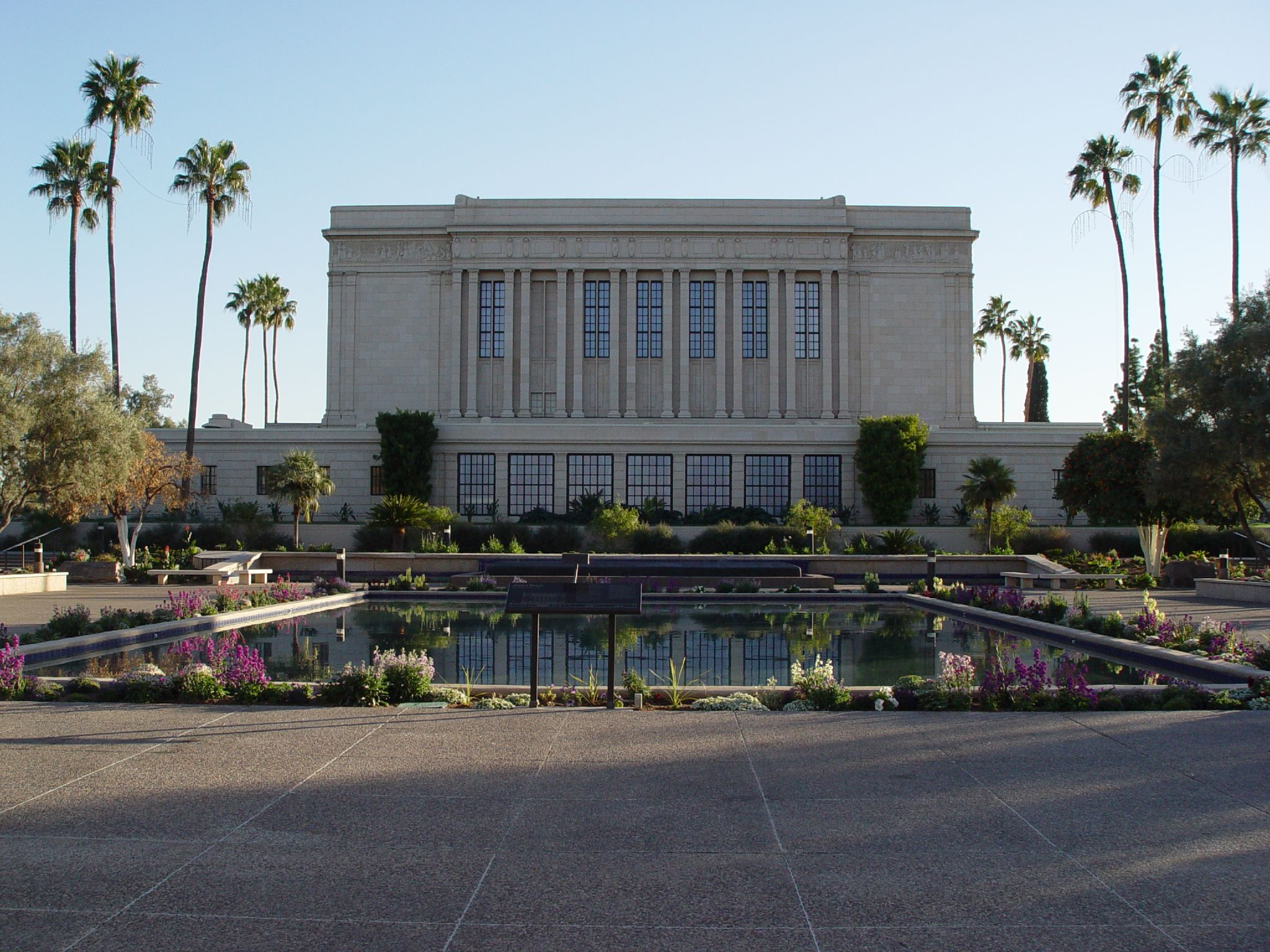
The Mesa Arizona Temple of the Church of Jesus Christ of Latter-day Saints.

A handful of temples of the Church of Jesus Christ of Latter-day Saints are evocations of the Temple. The Cardston Alberta Temple, Laie Hawaii Temple, and Mesa Arizona Temple are all designed after the style of Herod's Temple. Others, such as the Salt Lake Temple pay more indirectly homage, by orienting towards Jerusalem and having a large basin used as a baptismal font is mounted on the backs of twelve oxen, as was the Molten Sea of the Temple.

Masonic Temples in Freemasonry bear a similar symbolism. Solomon's Temple is a central symbol in Freemasonry, which holds that the first three Grand Masters were Solomon, Hiram I of Phoenicia, and Hiram Abiff, the fictitious craftsman and architect who built the temple. Masonic initiation rites include the reenactment of a scene set on the Temple Mount while it was under construction. Every Masonic lodge, therefore, is symbolically the Temple for the duration of the degree, and possesses ritual objects representing the architecture of the Temple. These may either be built into the hall or be portable. Among the most prominent are replicas of the pillars Boaz and Jachin through which every initiate has to pass.

== Replicas in the form of the Dome of the Rock ==
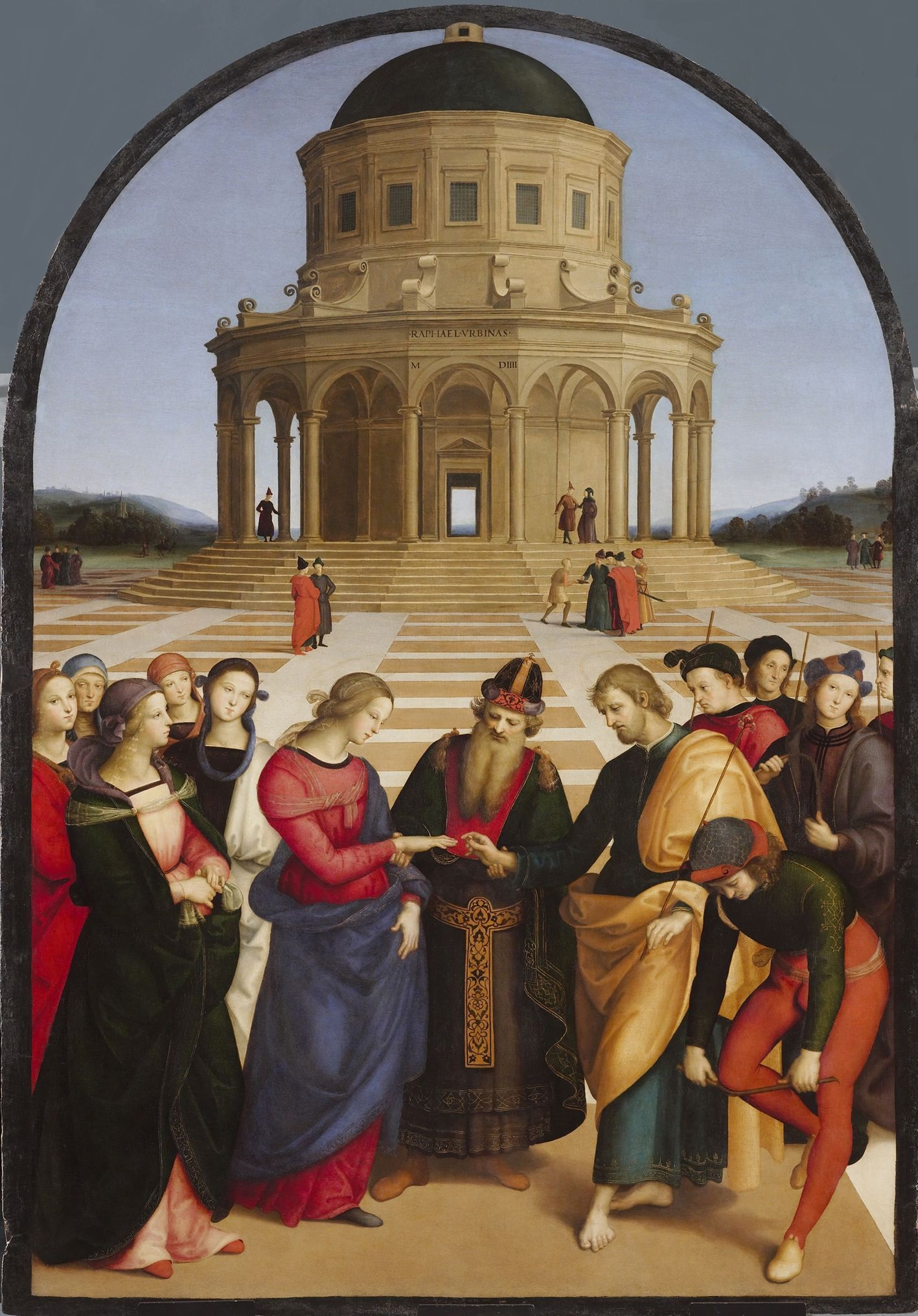
The Marriage of the Virgin, 1502

During and after the Christian conquest of Jerusalem, the Dome of the Rock was renamed the Templum Domini. The nearby al-Aqsa Mosque was renamed the "Temple of Solomon", the latter of which was where the Knights Templar had their headquarters in Jerusalem. The two buildings were sometimes conflated, and several buildings were designed as replicas of Solomon's Temple in the shape of the Dome of the Rock.

These replicas include the octagonal, fifteenth-century Church of St. Giacomo in Italy, and the octagonal, nineteenth-century Moorish Revival style Rumbach Street Synagogue in the Pest section of Budapest.

Palestine Park on the grounds of Chautauqua Institution in Chautauqua, New York has a small replica of the temple, depicted as the Dome of the Rock, part of a living topographical map of the Holy Land, complete with the Sea of Galilee, the Jordan River, and the Dead Sea. Chautauqua Lake stands in for the Mediterranean Sea.

In art, both Perugino's Marriage of the Virgin and Raphael's The Marriage of the Virgin both show the Temple as a Renaissance version of the Dome of the Rock.

== Replicas of the tabernacle ==
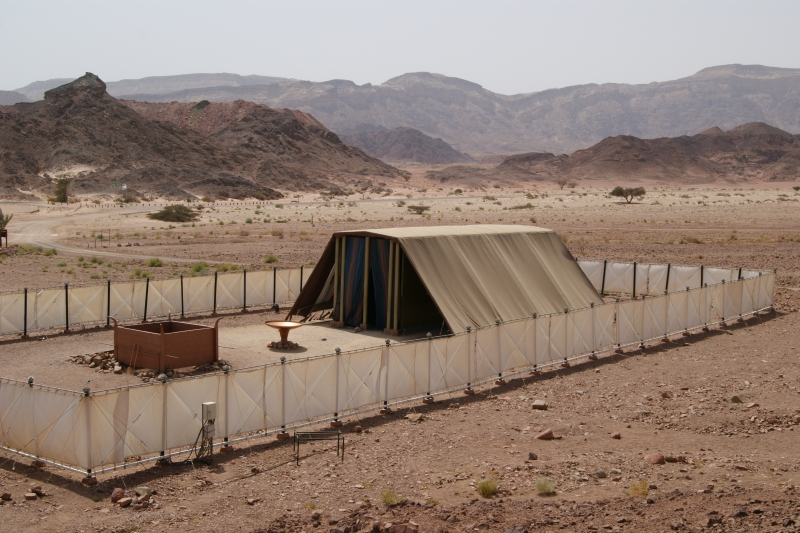
Model of the tabernacle in Timna Valley Park, Israel

The Glencairn Museum in Bryn Athyn, Pennsylvania has a replica of the biblical tabernacle dating from 1922. The Mennonite Information Center in Lancaster, Pennsylvania had a replica dating from the 1940s.

The Mishkan Shiloh synagogue in Shilo, Mateh Binyamin is designed as a replica of the Tabernacle.

In Israel, Timna Valley Park and Kibbutz Almog feature full-scale replicas.

== Bibliography ==
- Krinsky, Carol Herselle (1970). "Representations of the Temple of Jerusalem before 1500". Journal of the Warburg and Courtauld Institutes. 33. Warburg Institute: 1–19. ISSN 0075-4390. JSTOR 750887.
- Amanda Lillie. "Building the Picture: Imagining the Temple in Jerusalem: an archetype with multiple iconographies". The National Gallery, London.
