= Notes on the Jewish Temple =

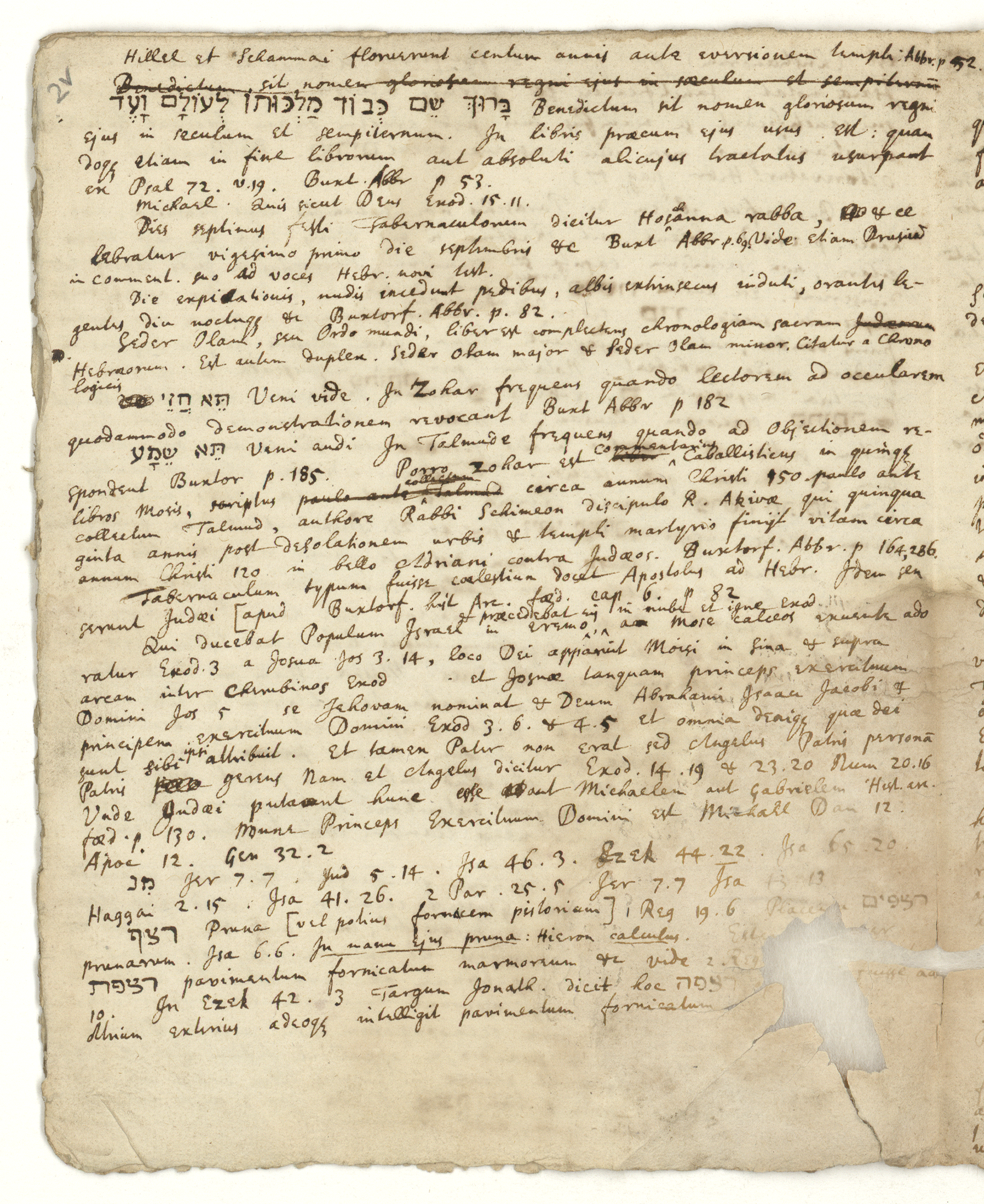
A page from the book containing Hebrew and Aramaic phrases which were copied to Hebrew letters by Newton, such as the phrase: "ברוך שם כבוד מלכותו לעולם ועד" (English: Blessed be the name of His glorious kingdom for all eternity)

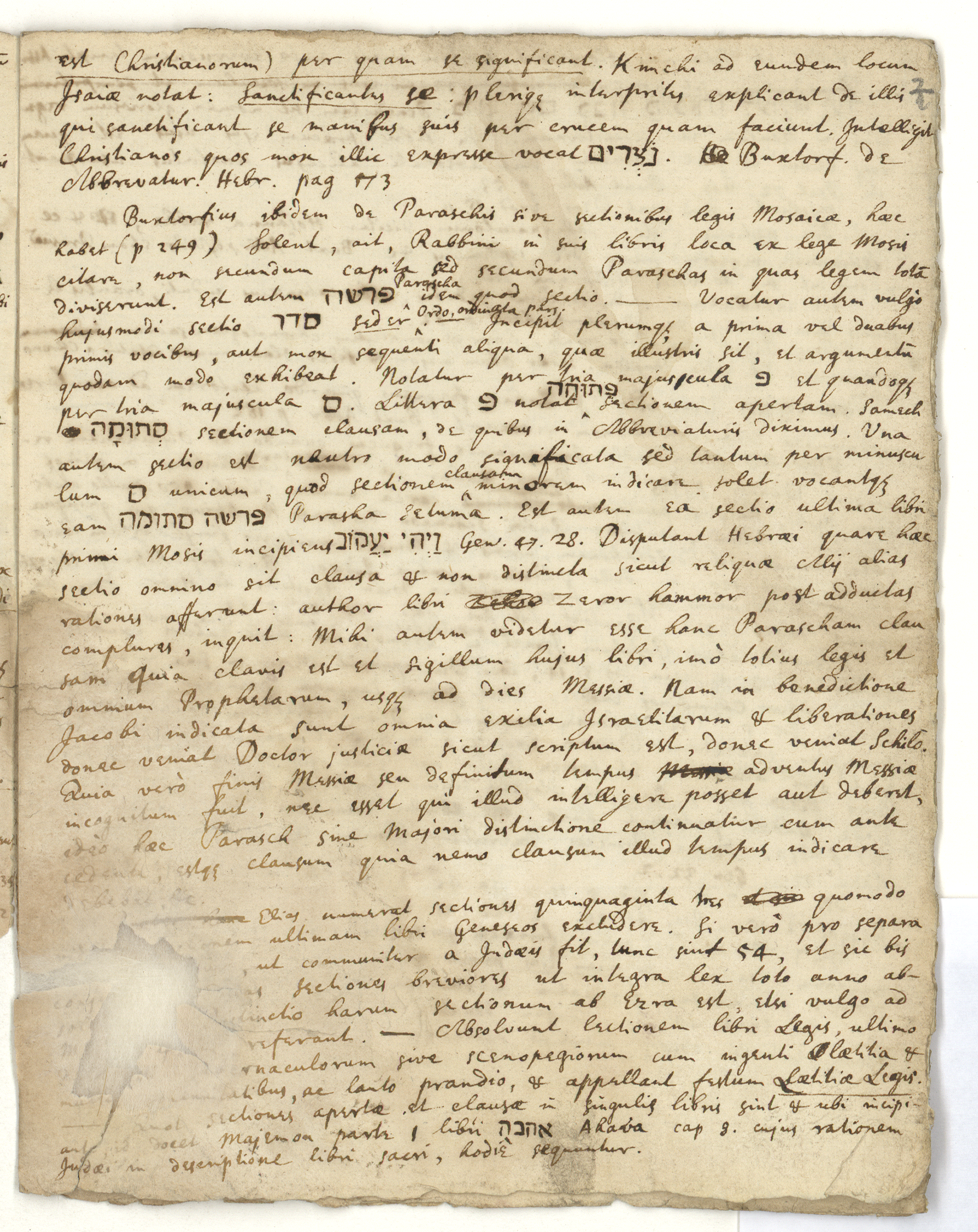

Notes on the Jewish Temple is a manuscript by Isaac Newton, written in Latin, Hebrew, Aramaic and Greek, which holds notes on the Jewish Temple and its rituals.

Today the manuscript is found in the collections of the National Library of Israel in Jerusalem.

== Description ==
The book contains Hebrew and Aramaic phrases which were copied to Hebrew letters by Newton, such as the phrase: "ברוך שם כבוד מלכותו לעולם ועד" (English: Blessed be the name of His glorious kingdom for all eternity). A Latin translation appears alongside the Hebrew and Aramaic phrases, together with additional explanations which are taken from the book "On Hebrew Abbreviations" by the Christian Hebraist, Johannes Buxtorf.

The manuscript contains references to a variety of sources, including the Old Testament, the Midrash (interpreting biblical stories) of the sophos Hillel and Shammai, the Talmud, the Zohar, and Targum Jonathan.

The dimension of the manuscript is 31 x 20 centimeters.

== History ==
Newton bases the book on the prophecy from the biblical Book of Ezekiel, which contains a description of the Temple. In addition, Newton uses a commentary about that prophecy description by the Spanish Jesuit, Juan Bautista Villalpando, and the critique about his commentary by Louis Cappel. This critique appeared on Brian Walton's multilingual edition of the Bible, of which Newton had a copy.

The manuscript is dated between 1675 and 1685.
