= Villalpando (disambiguation) =

Villalpando may refer to:

== People ==
- Juan Bautista Villalpando (1552–1608), Spanish Jesuit architect and mathematician
- Cristóbal de Villalpando (1649–1714), Mexican Baroque artist
- Jorge Villalpando (born 1985), Mexican goalkeeper
- Catalina Vasquez Villalpando (born 1940), 39th Treasurer of the United States

== Places ==
- Villalpando, municipality in Spain.
