= Temple of Solomon (São Paulo) =

Replica of the Jerusalem temple in Brazil

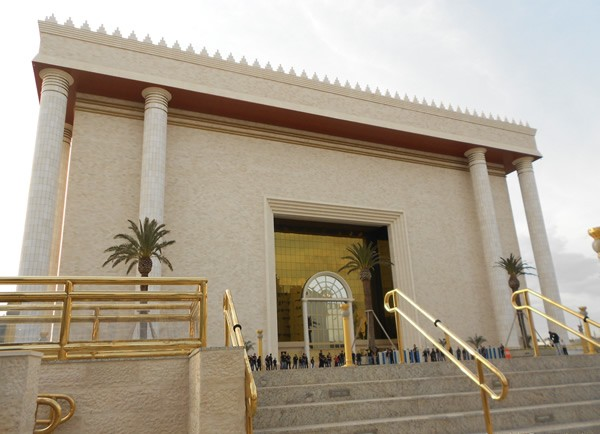

Religion
- Affiliation: Neopentecostal Christianity

Location
- Location: São Paulo, Brazil
- State: São Paulo
- Interactive map of Temple of Solomon
- Coordinates: 23°32′16″S 46°36′23″W

Architecture
- Architect: (Brazil) Rogério Silva de Araújo

Website
- http://www.otemplodesalomao.com/en/

The Temple of Solomon (Portuguese: Templo de Salomão, IPA: [ˈtẽplu dʒi saloˈmɐ̃w]) is a replica of the Temple of Solomon built by the Universal Church of the Kingdom of God (UCKG) in São Paulo.

According to Brazilian press reports, the new temple is an "exact replica" of the ancient Temple of Solomon in Jerusalem.

Bishop Edir Macedo, the founder and leader of the neo-pentecostal church, has said that the temple is twice the height of Rio de Janeiro's Catholic-sponsored Christ the Redeemer statue. Inside the temple there is a replica of the Ark of the Covenant constructed according to "biblical orientations".

== History ==
The Universal Church of the Kingdom of God was founded in Brazil in 1977. It claims to have 8 million communicants who live in 180 countries. It has a television channel, Rede Record, and a weekly newspaper.

On August 8, 2010, Bishop Edir Macedo presided over the foundation stone ceremony of the temple.

The temple was officially inaugurated on July 31, 2014. The inauguration attracted thousands of worshipers including then-Brazilian President Dilma Rousseff.

The Temple serves as both a house of worship and as world headquarters for the Church. The mega-church seats 10,000 worshipers and stands 55 meters (180') tall, the height of an 18-story building. Its dimensions therefore far exceed the temple it replicates, described in the Bible as having the relatively modest height of some thirteen meters ("thirty cubits", 1 Kings 6:2).

The majority of the temple space is devoted to the main sanctuary. It has a conveyor belt system designed to carry tithes and offerings from the altar directly into a safe room. Keeping with the Jewish theme of the temple, the walls are adorned with menorahs, and the entrance features a large central menorah.

The church spared no expense in designing the many other features of the temple. Aside from the main sanctuary, the temple also has 36 rooms for children's Bible school, with a capacity of about 1,300 children, radio and television studios, a museum about the original temple, and 84 apartments of differing sizes for bishops and pastors of the church. The 11-story complex includes outdoor features such as a helicopter landing pad, a garden of olive trees based on the Garden of Gethsemane near Jerusalem, and flags of several countries

One of the most prominent features of the temple is its large central altar. It features an exact replica of the Ark of the Covenant, built to the specifications described in the Book of Exodus. The structure is entirely covered in gold leaf.

In September 2019, Brazil's ex president Jair Bolsonaro visited temple to strengthen ties with UCKG.

== Construction ==
The temple construction cost about US$300m; the original estimate in 2010 was $200m. It took four years to build. The building was designed by architect Rogério Silva de Araújo.

The temple takes up an entire city block, and 24 properties had to be purchased in order to create the space to build it. The project also required new traffic signals and other improvements to the surrounding streets to improve traffic flow.

Construction on the temple used 28,000 cubic meters of concrete and two tons of steel. The church also contracted to import $8m worth of Jerusalem stone from Israel. The stone was used to cover the central pillars of the temple, the entrance, and the center aisle. Macedo told the Guardian that "We have signed the contract and commissioned the stones that will come from Jerusalem, just like the ones that were used to build the temple in Israel; stones that were witnesses to the powers of God, 2,000 [years] ago."

== Jewish reception ==
Brazil's Jewish community has generally accepted the temple, with a bit of reluctance. Rafael Edad, Israel's ambassador to Brazil, stated during the end of the temple construction that "four years is too little time to build something so great, with so many details. It is great like Brazil, I have no words". Some have had more mixed feelings, such as Brazilian rabbi Nilton Bonder, who stated "on the one hand, there's the favorable way in which Jewish culture and history are treated in the structure, [but] on the other, there's the bizarre aspect of the project's dimensions and aggressive marketing".

- List of the largest evangelical churches
- List of the largest evangelical church auditoriums
