= Juan Bautista Villalpando =

Spanish architect and mathematician (1552–1608)

Juan Bautista Villalpando also Villalpandus, or Villalpanda (1552 – 22 May 1608) was a Spanish priest, a member of the Jesuits, a scholar, mathematician, and architect.

== Life ==
Villalpando was born in Córdoba, Spain, in 1552. He joined the Society of Jesus in 1575 and for the Society he designed several buildings including the Cathedral in Baeza and San Hermenegildo Church in Seville. He studied geometry and architecture with Juan de Herrera, the architect of Philip II of Spain. After ordination, he specialised in the exegesis of the Old Testament.

In 1596, he published the first volume of Ezechielem Explanationes, or Commentary on Ezekiel a work begun by Jerónimo del Prado, who died the year prior. Villalpando was accused of heresy, but a review of his beliefs and writings by the Spanish Inquisition found him innocent. That same year he travelled to Rome where he published additional volumes in 1604. He died there on 22 May 1608.

== Work ==
Villalpando's major work as a scholar was a commentary on the prophet Ezekiel, published with the support of King Philip II. This text included imaginative reconstructions of Solomon's Temple and depictions of Jerusalem, which were renowned and influential. He based them on the vision of the prophet Ezekiel and published them in his Ezechielem Explanationes. They inspired many European illustrators and were circulated among the master builders of the 17th century.

His drawings were based on the assumption that the buildings of Jerusalem were designed using the laws of geometry, and they were drawn in parallel or orthographic projection, which is a form of image Villalpando likened to God's vision. Contradicting the theory developed by Vitruvius in De architectura, which sought to establish that the origins of the orders lay in the Architecture of ancient Greece, Villalpando argued that there was an original link between the classical orders and Solomon's Temple and that the classical orders had their origin in specifications detailed by God.

The Inquisition's interest in Villalpando centered on his illustrations as possible misinterpretations of scripture. In the opinion of some art historians, Villalpando's illustrations of Solomon's temple influenced numerous monastery constructions of the baroque era, as well as on the grids schemes of urban planners. Villalpando's imagery was used in the design of Protestant churches and synagogues in the 17th century.

Villalpando was a disciple of Juan de Herrera, architect of El Escorial, whose designs for that complex included quadratic inner courtyards and risalits.

Criticisms of Villalpando reconstruction of the Temple include: that the sub-structure of the Temple in his designs is exaggerated, (Note: This feature of an enormous buttressed base was later used by Fischer von Erlach in his Entwurf einer historischen Architektur, an early history of architecture, figuring prominently in its early pages.) that his work lacks any archaeological basis or grounding in realism, that he failed to use Jewish sources apart from the Hebrew Bible such as the writings of Josephus, the Talmud, and the writings of Maimonides.

Villalpando also wrote theoretical tracts on gravity, geometry and architecture, occupying himself above all with conveying the geometrical principles of constructions. Isaac Newton made use of Villalpando's works in his studies of architecture.
