= Global Difusion =

Portuguese media company

Global Difusion SGPS, SA is a Portuguese radio group controlled by members of the Universal Church of the Kingdom of God. It operates the Record FM network, Kiss FM, Rádio Positiva (the UCKG's station), Rádio Linear, Maiorca FM and Antena Sul. The company exists since at least 2006 and is a subsidiary of the UCKG, but the Portuguese regulator ERC never demanded information about its financial status. Officially, the UCKG's media outlets are the testimonial magazine Eu era assim, newspaper Folha de Portugal and Unifé TV; all under exemption status from the regulator. Global Difusion owns, through the UCKG, six companies: Horizontes Planos – Informação e Comunicação, Unipessoal, Lda.; R.T.A. – Sociedade de Radiodifusão e Telecomunicação de Albufeira, Unipessoal, Lda.; Record FM – Sociedade de Meios Audiovisuais de Sintra, Unipessoal, Lda.; Rádio Clube de Gaia – Serviço Local de Radiodifusão Sonora, SA; Rádio Pernes, Lda.; and Rádio Sem Fronteiras – Sociedade de Radiodifusão, SA.

As of 2015, the company's chairman was David Santos Perpétuo, current director of Record Europa, and is ultimately controlled by Edir Macedo, leader of the UCKG. Perpétuo controls much of the UCKG-linked media outlets in Portugal. The company is presided since 2019 by Bishop Domingos Siqueira, leader of the Portuguese division of the church.

Global Difusion bought Kiss FM from its founder in 2010. At the time, it also operated a station in Madrid, Mais Brasil FM.

Its fiscal results in 2022, for the sum of the six companies, were all negative: Global Difusion had a debt, the individual companies had negative equity and high liabilities.

== Stations ==
- Record FM Lisboa (Record FM Sintra)
- Antena Sul Rádio Jornal and Antena Sul Almodôvar (Horizontes Planos)
- Kiss FM (R.T.A.)
- Record FM Algarve (R.T.A.)
- Maiorca FM (Record FM Sintra)
- Record FM (Record FM Sintra)
- Rádio Positiva (Rádio Sem Fronteiras)
- Rádio Linear (Rádio Sem Fronteiras)
- Record FM Santarém (Rádio Pernes)

== See also ==
- Record Europa
