= TMT =

TMT may refer to:

== Science and engineering ==
- Tandem mass tag, a chemical label
- Temporal motivation theory, in psychology
- Terror management theory, in psychology
- Thermo-mechanical treatment, a metallurgical process
- Thirty Meter Telescope, astronomical telescope
- Trimethylthiazoline, a component of fox urine
- Trimethyltrienolone, an antiandrogen
- Trimethyltryptamine, synthetic and fungal biosynthetic indole molecules
- Tarsometatarsal joints, a set of joints in the midfoot

== Software ==
- Texas Multicore Technologies, licensee of SequenceL programming language

== Transport ==
- Today Makes Tomorrow, a Taiwanese shipping company
- Thane Municipal Transport, a bus operator in India
- Toyota Motor Thailand
- Tubular Modular Track for railways
- Porto Trombetas Airport, Pará, Brazil, IATA code

== Entertainment ==
- The Manila Times, a newspaper in the Philippines
- The Moscow Times, an Amsterdam-based newspaper
- Tiny Mix Tapes, a music web site
- TMT (TV channel), a defunct Polish television channel

== Sport ==
- TMT FC, a Gambian football club
- The Money Team, a brand of American boxer Floyd Mayweather Jr.

== Other uses ==
- Terror Management Theory, psychological branch of Terror
- Türk Mukavemet Teşkilatı ("Turkish Resistance Organisation"), Cyprus, 1958-1974
- Turkmenistani manat, ISO 4217 currency code
- Top Management Team, senior management in a business
- Technology, Media and Telecommunications, industry sector for investment banking
- Transporte, Multiplexação e Transmissão, a Mozambican-Chinese company responsible for digital terrestrial television in Mozambique
