= Televisão Miramar =

TV Miramar
- Country: Mozambique
- Broadcast area: Mozambique

Ownership
- Owner: Rede de Comunicação Miramar - TV, Rádio e Meios Digitais (Grupo Record)

History
- Launched: November 1998

Links
- Website: miramar.co.mz

Availability

Terrestrial
- TMT: Channel 3

TV Miramar, also simply known as Miramar, is a Mozambican free-to-air terrestrial television channel owned by Rede de Comunicação Miramar, which, in turn, is a member of Edir Macedo's Grupo Record. Since 2020, Leandro Pinheiro has been the current executive director of the Miramar group.

It broadcasts its content terrestrially via TMT, on channel 3, to all provinces of Mozambique, and on analog terrestrial television until the shutdown of the network in 2021. Miramar is also present in the country's main pay TV distributors: DStv, TVCabo, GOTV, StarTimes, but not Zap, and also livestreams much of its output through its website.

== History ==
TV Miramar was created in 1998 and was a de facto affiliate of the Record network since its inception. The name came from a network of radio stations set up in 1995 in Maputo, Beira and Nampula.

Miramar historically operated thanks to contributions from local members of the Universal Church of the Kingdom of God, the denomination Edir Macedo presides. Initially it reportedly covered Maputo alone. Local production at launch time consisted exclusively of news and UCKG programming.

Initially the programming came from Brazil on tape delay (one week of delay) but within a few years, had changed to satellite reception, but still on delay, considering timezone differences between the two countries. Between 2000 and 2001, it started a project that oversaw the expansion of its signal to a national scale. From 2002, the channel noticed a loss of viewers, as well as the move of presenters and employees to other local channels. Miramar received praise in its early years, due to its variety of programming, which up until then were relatively unknown in Mozambique's media landscape. Said crisis led to changes to TVM's policy and improval of the quality of the programmes it produced. In late 2005, aside from opening a television station in Uganda, Aroldo Martins, who was in charge of Record's international operations at the time, announced that the number of transmitters carrying Miramar would be doubled in 2006, from four to eight. Despite the growth, it didn't show signs of improving its schedule, in order to be more adequate in representing the Mozambican society.

Between 2003 and 2004, Daniel Chapo, who joined ruling party FRELIMO in 2009, was a television news presenter on the channel, after a brief stint at its sister radio station between 1997 and 1998.

As of 2007, the channel had two national newscasts, Miramar Notícias and Jornal da Miramar, as well as rebroadcasts of Jornal da Record from Brazil. The rebroadcast of the Brazilian newscast reflected the station's disrespect for both quality and quantity, as the news reports didn't match local interests

In 2008, unlike other Record stations in Brazil and in other parts of the world that operated 24/7, the station signed on daily at 5am and ended at 12:15am on weekdays and 2am on weekends. Instead of carrying UCKG programming throughout the night, a practice that is common among Macedo's stations, the station inserted the church content at several slots throughout the day and simply closed down. During this period, it became the first television station to produce a newscast in a local language, Madzungula ya Miramar, in Ronga.

The channel broadcast the 2018 FIFA World Cup alongside Televisão de Moçambique and TV Sucesso, in a package of 36 matches negotiated by Econet's Kwesé Sports.

In 2022, the channel obtained rights to a package of matches of the 2022 FIFA World Cup held in Qatar, the third such World Cup broadcast by the channel. This subsequently expanded to the 2023 FIFA Women's World Cup. In 2025, it aired twenty matches of the 2025 FIFA Club World Cup. On May 29, 2026, it obtained the rights to the 2026 FIFA World Cup.
