= Record Bahia Itabuna =

Television station in Itabuna, Bahia, Brazil

Record Bahia Itabuna (ZYA 300/ZYP 324)
Itabuna, Bahia; Brazil
- Channels: Digital: 17 (UHF); Virtual: 7

Programming
- Affiliations: Record

Ownership
- Owner: Grupo Record; (Televisão Cabrália Ltda.)

History
- First air date: December 12, 1987
- Former names: TV Cabrália (1987–2009); TV Cabrália Record News (2009–2013); TV Record Cabrália (2013–2016); RecordTV Cabrália (2016–2023); Record Cabrália (2023–2025)
- Former channel numbers: Analog; 7 (VHF, 1987–2025)
- Former affiliations: Rede Manchete (1987–1993); SBT (1993–1995); Rede Record (1995–1998); Rede Família (1998–2003); Rede Mulher (2003–2007); Record News (2007–2013)

Technical information
- Licensing authority: ANATEL
- ERP: 4.7 kW

Links
- Public license information: Profile
- Website: https://record.r7.com/record-emissoras/nordeste/record-cabralia/

Record Bahia Itabuna (channel 7) is a Brazilian broadcast television station in Itabuna, Bahia, carrying the Record network for the southern part of the state. The station is owned-and-operated by Grupo Record, which also controls Record Bahia in Salvador.

== History ==
The TV Cabrália concession was opened by the Federal Government, by Decree No. 81,600, of April 25, 1978, through transmission to channel 7, including the retransmitter in Buerarema, on channel 11. The authorization was signed by the Ministry of Communications on February 7, 1985, with the intention of operating in the city of Itabuna.

TV Cabrália went on air on December 12, 1987, as an affiliate of Rede Manchete, being the first affiliate in the interior of Bahia. It was founded by businessman and then federal deputy Luiz Viana Neto, who was one of the partners of TV Aratu, in the capital Salvador, which was also affiliated with Manchete. Its first superintendent director was Nestor Amazonas, responsible for its installation.

One of the station's first local programs was the thirty-minute long Jornal Meio Dia, presented by Vilma Medina, then by others, including Cláudia Barthel. Barthel worked at TV Santa Cruz, Globo's O&Os in Rio de Janeiro and São Paulo and then went to Rede Manchete and RedeTV!, where she remains today. Another news program was Repórter Regional, presented by Maurício Maron.

In 1992, TV Cabrália received donations for the campaign to collect food, medicine, clothes and blankets for the victims of Santa Catarina and the Itajaí Valley, after the long campaign. The broadcaster joined the campaign and in just a few days raised tons of donations. In 1993, due to the serious crisis faced by Rede Manchete since 1992 and the loss of audience, TV Cabrália left the network to be the second affiliate of the Sistema Brasileiro de Televisão (SBT) in Bahia (the first was TV Itapoan, since 1981).

In the first months of 1995, TV Cabrália was sold to Central Record de Comunicação, belonging to the businessman and bishop of the Universal Church of the Kingdom of God, Edir Macedo. After the purchase, TV Cabrália became Rede Record's own broadcaster on July 1, leaving SBT. The station was the first affiliate of the network in Bahia and installed a relayer on VHF channel 9 in Salvador.

In 1997, after the purchase of TV Itapoan and the repeaters in Bahia by the same Edir Macedo, the broadcaster stopped broadcasting Record, as Itapoan, which had been affiliated with SBT since 1981, left the network to become Record's own broadcaster. As a result, Cabrália started to operate without affiliations, becoming independent and being autonomous for a short time, when it produced its own programming.

In 1998, the broadcaster became one of the first affiliates of the recently opened Rede Família, leaving it to be independent, removing several local programs from the air. With the new affiliation, the assistance program Alerta Total debuted, lasting half an hour, presented by Reginaldo Silva, who is an evangelical pastor and also a councilor in Itabuna. The Jornal do Meio-Dia (formed by six news blocks, the first three produced by Itabuna and the last three by Vitória da Conquista) was also maintained.

On February 2, 2003, the station began to retransmit Rede Mulher programming, at the same time that Rede Família also became an affiliate of the network. In the same year, the broadcaster was sued along with TV Itapoan, by practitioners of Afro-Brazilian religions (such as the pai-de-santo or babalorixás). Religious people complained about the constant daily attacks from pastors who present religious television programs on TV Itapoan and TV Cabrália, carried out by the Universal Church of the Kingdom of God. In the programs, Afro-Brazilian religious practices were called "encosto", a word associated with spirits that can harm people.

In July 2004, complaints from the Federal Public Ministry (MPF), based on documents from the Bahia Commercial Board, revealed that the senator for the State of Rio de Janeiro and bishop of the Universal Church of the Kingdom of God, Marcelo Crivella, from the Liberal Party (PL) and candidate for mayor of the city of Rio de Janeiro, he still remained a partner and majority manager of TV Cabrália in 2003, despite the law prohibiting politicians from holding positions in radio and TV stations.

On September 27, 2007, TV Cabrália became part of Record News network that replaced Rede Família, the first 24-hour journalism channel on free open television in the country. After the creation of Record News, in a project to "reengineer" the broadcaster to adapt the new network, the broadcaster's general director, André Luís Ferreira, announced cuts to almost all programs produced and closed the Vitória da Conquista branch.

On October 23, the Union of Professional Journalists of Bahia (Sinjorba), released a note of denunciation and repudiation against the management of TV Cabrália, denouncing that the broadcaster fired all professionals from the branch in Vitória da Conquista, after transforming into a rebroadcaster from Record News. According to Sinjorba directors, the layoffs were not restricted to the Vitória da Conquista branch (which was closed), and also in Itabuna, several journalism production professionals were fired.

With the changes, TV Cabrália was limited to producing just two local programs, Alerta Total and Fala Bahia. The dismissals of journalists and technicians from Cabrália advanced even further after the station became a rebroadcaster of the Record News news channel and stories from Bahia began to be generated only by TV Itapoan. By the end of December, there were already 40 professionals.

On the morning of January 4, 2008, the station's general director, André Luís Ferreira, announced the dismissal of the journalism manager, Kátia Morais, the presenter Adana Matos and employees from the technical area. In addition to the new layoffs, André Ferreira announced the extinction of the television news program Fala Bahia. With the decision, TV Cabrália started to only generate Alerta Total, at noon, presented by Ricardo Bacelar. The broadcaster kept only two reporters on its staff, Aureana Bacelar and Tom Ribeiro, in addition to presenter Ricardo Bacelar.

On January 15, Ricardo was also fired, after 14 years of work at the station. The dismissal was communicated to him by the director of TV Cabrália, André Ferreira, when Bacelar arrived at the station to present Alerta Total. On the same day, the president of the Municipal Directory of the Brazilian Socialist Party (PSB) in Itabuna, Aurélio Macedo, issued a statement against the dismissal of the presenter in which he denounced that the management of the station chaired by André Ferreira fired Bacelar just because he refused to disaffiliate. from the PSB.

On the 14th, André had demanded that Bacelar present the letter of disaffiliation from the PSB, giving a deadline of the 16th, but one day before the deadline, the director announced that the professional was disconnected from the broadcaster. According to complaints from other PSB leaders, pressure from the broadcaster began in 2007 and increased after the Universal Church of the Kingdom of God (IURD) defined its pre-candidates for mayor and councilor in Itabuna, in clear interference in the election municipal in the city. Both names were from PRB.

On June 30, 2009, TV Cabrália was retransmitted in Vitória da Conquista through VHF channel 7. On August 20, the broadcaster presented new programming and investments. The news programs Record News Bahia and Record News no Ar were announced. In the same period, the station started to have branches in Porto Seguro and Teixeira de Freitas, in addition to having repeaters in several capitals in the Northeast.

On January 25, 2010, after the period of layoffs and also the expansion of the broadcaster in the southeast, south and east of Bahia and other Brazilian states, the broadcaster once again suspended its activities in Vitória da Conquista (third largest city in Bahia) and announces the layoffs again, surprising the station's employees in the city. The station's management claimed that revenue was below what was expected by management.

On July 4, 2013, after more than five years, TV Cabrália ceased to be part of Record News, once again becoming Rede Record's own broadcaster. The Record News retransmitters in both regions stopped broadcasting the programming generated in Itabuna and started repeating the Record News Araraquara signal. As a result, the station's name was changed to TV Record Cabrália, and Alerta Total gave way to Balanço Geral BA. The station also began rebroadcasting local programs from TV Record Bahia.

On November 24, 2016, along with all other broadcasters on the network, TV Record Cabrália underwent a rebranding, becoming RecordTV Cabrália. On April 1, 2020, the local edition of BA Record was made defunct, and the station started to retransmit the state version of the newscast, produced by Record Bahia. With the closure of Salvador's news service, Record Cabrália stopped rebroadcasting programs from its sister station in the capital.

On December 2, 2023, Record Cabrália started delivering its signal via satellite using the SAT HD Regional system. On January 13, 2025, Record Cabrália was removed from this system. With that, viewers who were used to seeing the Itabunan station's programming in south and south-western Bahia started receiving Record Bahia, from Salvador, and the local programming produced by Cabrália was limited to its terrestrial transmission.

Also in January 2025, Cabrália no Ar presented by Camila Morais, was suspended, causing the station to relay Bahia no Ar live from Salvador. On April 8, the station abandoned the usage of the name "Cabrália" for the first time in 37 years and was renamed Record Bahia Itabuna, in another movement to reintegrate the station with the one in Salvador.

On June 30, 2025, the station's analog signal was shuttered following the official ANATEL roadmap for the state of Bahia.
