= Unifé TV =

- Country: Portugal
- Broadcast area: Portugal

Programming
- Picture format: 1080i HDTV

Ownership
- Owner: Universal Church of the Kingdom of God)

History
- Launched: 30 August 2022

Unifé TV is a Portuguese pay television channel owned by the Universal Church of the Kingdom of God, a Brazilian evangelical megachurch. Most of its programming is produced locally. The network is under exhemption status from the Portuguese regulator ERC.

== History ==
The Universal Church applied a license for Unifé TV on 6 December 2021 and had its license approved in May; MEO would be in charge of distributing its signal to the pay-TV providers, as well as an agreement with Record Europa to use its infrastructure. The channel started broadcasting on 30 August 2022, using facilities in Lisbon, Vila Nova de Gaia and Porto. The channel, using a name similar to channels in Argentina and Mexico, was directed at launch by Lúcio da Conceição Machado, and the news operation by Rui António de Jesus Morais.

Unifé does not have a generalist license and does not have the financial means to justify the inclusion of some obligations, such as a minimum amount of sign language programming.

The news operation of the channel has been described by Página Um as being akin to CMTV; debates and interviews are also included in such programs. ERC, the Portuguese regulator, decided to "soften" its benefits and treated the UCKG as an irrelevant entity in Portuguese media.

Former editor-in-chief at the channel Rita Cordeiro was appointed as the Chega candidate for Mértola for the 2025 Portuguese local elections.
