= Record FM (Portugal) =

Portuguese radio station

- Portugal
- Frequencies: 107.7 MHz (Lisbon and Santarém); FM 91.8 MHz (Algarve); FM 95.5 MHz (Porto); FM 101.4 MHz (Leiria); FM 105.5 MHz (Santarém)

Programming
- Format: Contemporary hit radio

Ownership
- Owner: Global Difusion
- Sister stations: Rádio Positiva, Kiss FM

History
- First air date: 5 November 2007

Links
- Website: recordfm.pt

Record FM is a Portuguese radio network owned by Global Difusion, a figurehead company of the Universal Church of the Kingdom of God, which, as of 2022, was in debt. The network started in 2007 when Record Europa announced the rename of Nossa FM to match its television sister; later, in 2017, it became a semi-national network, replacing Rádio Placard (Gaia-Porto), Algarve FM (Faro), Rádio Liz (Leiria) and Rádio Pernes (Santarém). It is one of the several radio stations indirectly owned by the UCKG.

== History ==
On November 5, 2007, Aroldo Martins (president of Record Internacional and director of Record Europa) launched Record FM, replacing the UCKG religious station Nossa FM. Its initial target audience consisted largely of Brazilians living in Portugal, but also wanted to targer Portuguese listeners, airing coverage of Portuguese football matches. The existing Nossa FM team continued working at the new station, accompanied by four new staff members.

In December 2016, it was announced that Record FM invested €2,5 million to increase its transmitter network, by expanding it to other stations the parent company owned, forming a network, as it did not intend to replace the existing local staff. The new network was initially due for a February 2017 launch. On November 4, 2021, ANACOM approved the usage of a frequency in Figueira da Foz.

On April 13, 2024, network announcer Cristina Gabriel, who was also Tony Carreira's agent, died of an oncological disease.
