= Máquina de Quadrinhos =

Comic-sharing website, 2009–2013

Máquina de Quadrinhos da Turma da Mônica
- Available in: Portuguese
- Founded: 2009; 17 years ago
- Owner: MSP
- Parent: MSP (2009–2011); R7 (2011-2013)
- Registration: Optional: required to create and publish comics.
- Launched: 2009; 17 years ago
- Current status: Defunct. CD version still available.

The Máquina de Quadrinhos da Turma da Mônica, or just Máquina de Quadrinhos (MQTM) is a website created by Mauricio de Sousa Produções with partnership with Lector.com for the creation of comic strips and comics based on the Turma da Mônica comic series. The stories created on site could be published in Monica and Friends official comics.

Launched on September 11, 2009, the site had 58 million stories published and 3 million visits from 62 countries. On November 11, 2011, the site entered into a partnership with R7. It ceased operations on April 21, 2013.

The site has since been available as a mirror.

== History and Features ==
=== Comic strip creation ===
The site allowed users to create comic strip stories by selecting characters and settings. After the story was saved, it could be published after going through a moderation process. Stories with inappropriate content could be blocked. After being published, the stories could be viewed and commented on by other authors, and judged through votes with various categories (script, romance, fun, innovation, adventure and art).

100+ images were available to use in creating stories, including images of the comic characters, objects, backgrounds, text bubbles, and effects. The images were divided into packages by various themes, some of which were blocked by a paywall.

==== Events and Contests ====
The site administrators hosted events and contests periodically throughout the year, including themed contests for Carnival, Easter, Mother's Day, Father's Day, Halloween, Christmas and New Year.

Soon after its founding, Máquina de Quadrinhos created a promotion that would showcase the best stories from the site in the official Monica and Friends comic books. In 2010, some stories began to be included in the comics, with the authors receiving credit and remuneration. Select stories were also stores in an internet archive on the site beginning in 2009.

=== CD Release ===
In 2010, a CD edition of the website was released, made for schools, colleges, courses and libraries. Packages could be purchased on demand, including new school-themed packages such as Geography, Portuguese Language, Natural Sciences, History, and Mathematics. This version was made in Adobe AIR.

=== Estação Robô ===
In July 2011, the Máquina de Quadrinhos would receive another surprise addition. In August of that year, the online game Estação Robô was launched on the site, which all authors had access to. The game started with one station (Estação Lua) with 28 levels. After completing each level, a new station was unlocked. There was also news that more stations would be added in the future, but no new game structures were ever developed.

=== R7 partnership and end ===
On November 8, 2011, Máquina de Quadrinhos went temporarily offline. On November 11, the site returned with the news that it had partnered with R7, with the aim of improving the site's quality.

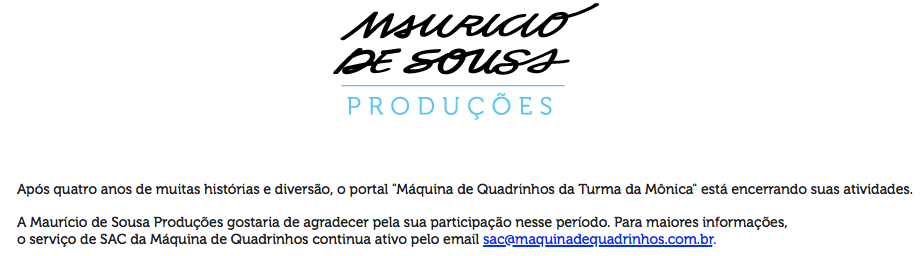
Website ending message

By 2013, the website's reputation had declined due to the proliferation of adult stories by users, the removal of moderators, and the inability for new users to join the site. The site officially went offline on April 19, 2013. Mauricio de Sousa Produções argued that the site "was experiencing security problems" and "would return better than ever," but this never happened, and the site never returned. Following this, Maurício de Sousa Produções posted a notice on the website announcing that it had been permanently shut down.

== Controversies ==
=== Inappropriate Comics ===
In 2011, a user named "_Laissaa_" published a comic named ":D" which was inappropriate for children (the website's target users). The comic showed Cebolinha and Mônica in an inappropriate manner. This comic was received extremely negatively by the website's community, and blogs dedicated to the website started making hate posts towards Laissaa. In 2012, Laissaa published another comic titled "Paz" (in English, "peace"), that was intended to ease the conflicts between her and the community. However, this did not happen, as the community did not forgive her. Some time later, Laissaa left the internet. They had also allegedly created alternative accounts in the website, including "_L_" and "ContraSunnyi".
