= TV Equatorial =

TV Equatorial (ZYA 288)
Macapá, Amapá; Brazil
- Channels: Digital: 14 (UHF); Virtual: 14
- Branding: TV Equatorial

Programming
- Affiliations: TV Cultura

Ownership
- Owner: Z Sistema Equatorial de Comunicações; (Z Sistema Equatorial de Comunicações Ltda.)

History
- First air date: September 15, 1981
- Former channel numbers: Analog: 8 (VHF, 1981–2018)
- Former affiliations: Rede Bandeirantes (1983-1987); Rede Manchete (1987-1999); TV! (1999); RedeTV! (1999-2000); Rede Mulher (2000-2007); Record News (2007-2018)

Technical information
- Licensing authority: ANATEL
- Transmitter coordinates: 0°2′45.1″N 51°3′22.2″W

Links
- Public license information: Profile

TV Equatorial (channel 14) is a TV Cultura-affiliated station licensed to Macapá, the capital of the state of Amapá. The station is owned by Z Sistema Equatorial de Comunicação, owned by businessman José de Matos Costa, who also owns Rádio Equatorial and Equatorial FM.

== History ==
The concession of VHF channel 8 in Macapá was granted through a decree signed by President João Figueiredo on September 15, 1981, to businessman José de Matos Costa, known as Zelito, owner of Rádio Equatorial, who had the political support of the then governor of the federal territory of Amapá, Aníbal Barcelos, to obtain it. Due to the little information available about the history of the station, it is not known for sure when TV Equatorial broadcasts began. The oldest record referring to it is dated September 29, 1983, about its first live external broadcast. On this day, reporter Nilson Montoril covered live the return of governor Aníbal Barcellos to Macapá, after a meeting held in Brasília with interior minister Mario Andreazza, to transform the then federal territory of Amapá into a state of the federation from 1984 onwards. Such status, however, was only possible after the approval of the 1988 Constitution.

The station initially broadcast Rede Bandeirantes' programming, and between 1985 and 1987 it showed Programa Silvio Santos, produced by SBT, on Sundays, an arrangement similar to that adopted by TV Cidade de Fortaleza, Ceará. In October 1987, TV Equatorial left Rede Bandeirantes and became an affiliate of Rede Manchete. At the same time, it received concessions to implement retransmitters in municipalities in the interior of Amapá; however, they were never implemented.

TV Equatorial retransmitted Manchete's programming in Amapá from the beginning of its golden phase, until the events that culminated in its bankruptcy on May 10, 1999. The station followed the transition process to a new network, retransmitting RedeTV!'s provisional programming as TV!, and on November 15, it became one of the first charter affiliates of RedeTV!. In 2000, the station lost its affiliation to TV Tucuju, due to low investment in local programming, and began broadcasting Rede Mulher's programming. On September 27, 2007, with the emergence of Record News, which replaced the old network, TV Equatorial became one of its first affiliates.

With the end of analog transmissions in Macapá, TV Equatorial went off the air on August 14, 2018, and only resumed its transmissions on January 16, 2021, through UHF channel 14 (physical and virtual, instead of using virtual 8.1). After two days of showing just one slide with its logo, the station started broadcasting TV Cultura's programming on January 18, since Record News began to have its programming shown on TV Marco Zero during the period in which the broadcaster was off the air.

== Technical information ==
Virtual channel	Digital channel	Aspect ratio	Content
14.1	14 UHF	1080i	Main TV Equatorial programming / TV Cultura

On June 25, 2015, through ordinance no. 1,401, TV Equatorial won the concession for channel 14 UHF to operate its digital transmissions. However, the station was unable to carry out the transition before the analogue shutdown, which according to ANATEL's official roadmap, was scheduled for August 14, 2018. On the scheduled date, TV Equatorial, as well as the other broadcasters in Macapá, ceased transmissions on VHF channel 8, remaining off the air until January 16, 2021, when the digital signal was finally activated.

== Programming ==
Historically, TV Equatorial has made few investments in local programming, in contrast to its competitors. In its first years on the air, the station showed the Equatorial Cidade news bulletin during breaks in its programming, with reports and interviews about everyday events in Macapá. The broadcaster only maintained a reporting team to produce material, and it was generally the reporter who prepared the agenda and carried out the story, as the broadcaster had no editors. Jornal Equatorial was the station's only news program, at the time lasting around 10 minutes.

According to journalist Édi Ribeiro, who worked as a reporter at the station for a month in 1985, TV Equatorial did not evolve technically due to a lack of will on the part of its owner, Zelito. That year, the broadcaster was the first to acquire teleprompter equipment, which would allow the news anchor to read the news without taking his eyes off the camera. However, Zelito never allowed the installation of the equipment because, according to Édi, he believed that the anchor should memorize the text.

The station remained for years with only Jornal Equatorial and Equatorial Cidade filling the programming. In spaces where there was no local programming or advertisers during breaks, video clips of songs played by one of the group's radio stations, Equatorial FM, were always shown. In 1999, alongside the bankruptcy of Rede Manchete, the station deactivated its news department, returning to operate it at irregular intervals of time in the following years, only with the production of the Equatorial Cidade bulletin, and using the same precarious structure of just one reporter and one cameraman to produce all the reports.

The station's only known entertainment program was the Programa Carlos Santos, an independent variety produced in Belém, Pará and shown on several stations in the North and Northeast during the 2000s. On TV Equatorial, the program was shown from 2001 until 2010, when it went off the air after presenter Carlos Santos ran for state deputy in that year's elections.
