= Mãolee =

- Born: Henrique Paes Lima
- Origin: Rio de Janeiro, Brazil
- Genres: Hip hop
- Occupations: Hip hop producer, Beatmaker
- Years active: 2009–present
- Label: Tudubom Records

Henrique Paes Lima, better known by the stage name Mãolee, is a Brazilian music producer, who is known for his projects with rapper Filipe Ret and the Tudubom Records label, being that they recorded and created several songs together.

== Career ==
In 2009, Mãolee emerged in the Hip Hop scene when he teamed up with Brazilian rapper Filipe Ret and released the album: "Numa Margem Distante". Mãolee's partnership with Ret persisted in the albums "Vivaz" (2012), "Revel" (2015), and "Audaz" (2018), in which he also produced several tracks. During this period, the beatmaker also produced and created songs for other artists, such as the remake of the album “When Love is New”, by soul idol Billy Paul, a series of remixes by MC Brinquedo and Péricles, in addition to the new track "Diss que Te Ama", released by Pineapple StormTV (creators of Poesia Acústica), in partnership with Akira, Xamã, Kayuá and BK, which has already reached approximately 1.8 million views on YouTube. The carioca soul groove utilized in Mãolee's instrumentals is influenced by names like Tupac Shakur, J Dilla, Racionais MC's, Dr. Dre, Marcelo D2, DJ Khaled, among others. Mãolee is considered an entrepreneur, DJ, beatmaker and producer, being responsible for several renowned productions, mainly on the albums Audaz, Vivaz and Revel by Filipe Ret. Since 2017, Mãolee has been presenting himself as a solo artist, a career that has been established and made him one of the pioneers of this movement in national rap. In the second half of last year, he released the album Bendito, which right away became one of the highlights of Tudubom Records.

A music producer who created various hits that contain more than 150 million views, Mãolee grew up listening to the soul genre, an influence from his father. He also enjoys funk and samba due to his upbringing on Rua Cardoso Junior, one of the main points of the bohemia culture in the South Side of Rio de Janeiro. He was a percussionist in carnival blocks and, as a teenager, he began to attend Carioca Funk dance events and parties. Even today, he is influenced by these carioca musical genres, and produces in several genres such as: boom bap, pagode and trap.

Together with Filipe Ret, Mãolee released the project "Numa Margem Distante". Their live shows began to gain more notoriety in the underground hip hop scene and the idea of starting an independent label was strengthened. In 2011, the two created Tudubom Records. On Filipe Ret's first album, entitled VIVAZ, the song Neurótico de Guerra was featured on the radio.

On the album Audaz, he reached the mark of 50 million views together with Filipe Ret. Mãolee produced the track “Do Yourself”, which currently has more than 5 million views on YouTube, being one of the most listened to songs on the album.

In 2023, he released the song "Vem Pra Cá" featuring TZ da Coronel, Delacruz, Tiee and Tizi Kilates.

== Discography ==
=== with Filipe Ret ===
- 2009 - Numa Margem Distante
- 2012 - Vivaz
- 2015 – Revel
- 2018 - Audaz

=== Solo albums ===
- 2018 - Bendito
- 2019 - Mano Não Toca na Lace

=== Videos ===
- 2018 - Tchotchomary (with MC Pocahontas, Mode$tia, Don Cesão, Yannick, Gutierrez, Filipe Ret e Akira)

=== Awards ===
- "Prêmio FM O Dia 2015"
- YouTube Silver Play Button Rewards
