= Equatorial =

Equatorial may refer to something related to:

- Earth's equator
  - the tropics, the Earth's equatorial region
  - tropical climate
- the Celestial equator
  - equatorial orbit
  - equatorial coordinate system
  - equatorial mount, of telescopes
- equatorial bond, a type of chemical bond orientation
- TV Equatorial, a television station in Macapá, Amapá, Brazil
- Equatorial Guinea

== See also ==
- Equator (disambiguation)
