= Correio do Povo =

Brazilian daily newspaper

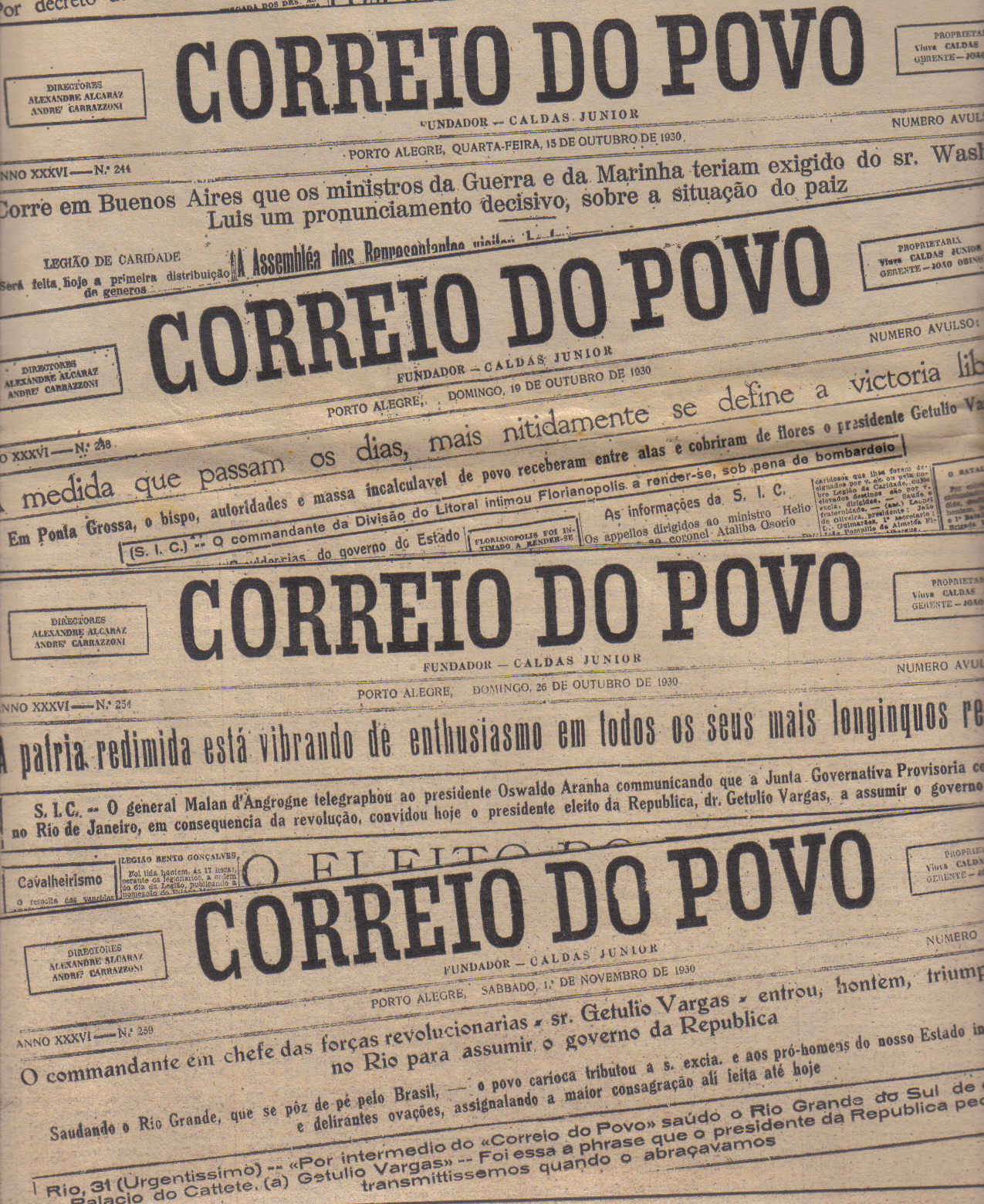
- Type: Daily newspaper
- Format: Tabloid
- Owner: Grupo Record
- Editor: Telmo Flor
- Founded: October 1, 1895
- Political alignment: Claims impartiality
- Headquarters: Rua Caldas Júnior 219, Porto Alegre, Brazil
- Website: www.correiodopovo.com.br

Correio do Povo (The People's Mail) is a Brazilian daily newspaper printed in the city of Porto Alegre, located in the state of Rio Grande do Sul. The newspaper is owned by Grupo Record.

== Past ==
Founded by Francisco Antônio Vieira Caldas Junior, it arose as a politically independent but democracy defending newspaper. In its first issue it was defined as Independent, noble and strong.

The newspaper occupied all subjects of interest to society and was open to all thought chains. To the death of its founder, (him being just 45 years old), position was made of newspaper his life. Dolores Alcaraz Caldas assumed the periodical, and counted with the collaboration of journalists like Alcides Maia and Alcides Gonzaga. In 1935, Breno Alcaraz Caldas (1910–1986), Francisco Antônio's grandson, assumed control of the paper, and remained for more than half a century in that position.

After his presidency, however, the group fell into a crisis. In 1984, after long periods of agony, Correio do Povo stopped its rotary presses due to financial difficulties derived from the great investments made by Correio do Povo in order to complete the creation of a new TV Station, TV Guaíba, in the late 1970s. Two years later, the newspaper was relaunched under the command of economist and entrepreneur Renato Bastos Ribeiro, who owned the paper until 2007. In March 2007, Correio do Povo was sold to Edir Macedo, owner of the media conglomerate Grupo Record.

== Present days ==
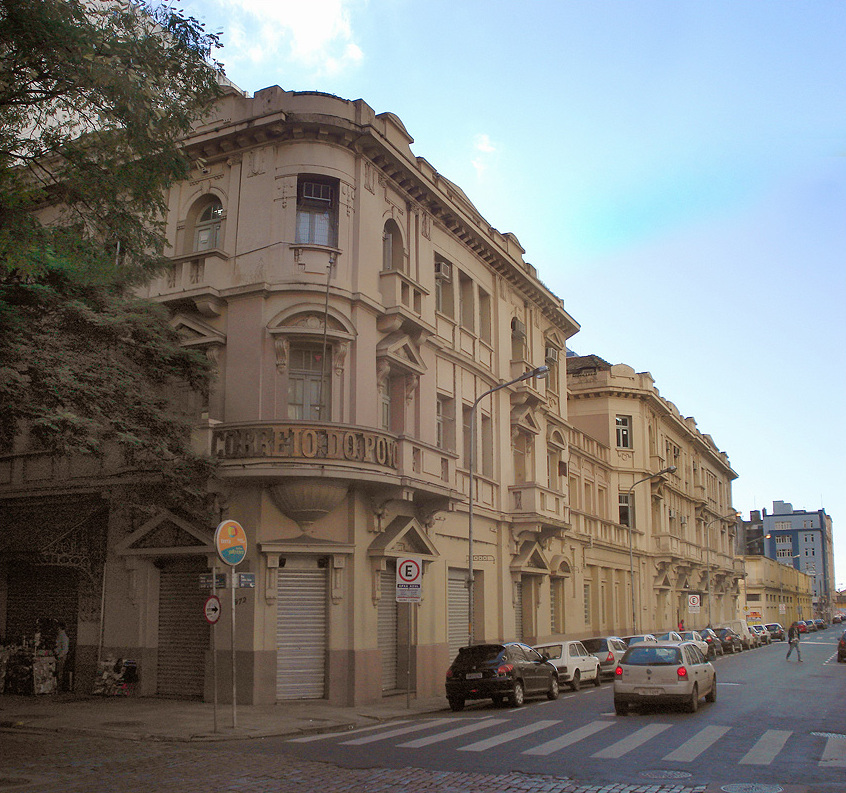
Correio do Povo

Daily, Correio do Povo is transmitted by satellite to other printing presses located in the cities of Carazinho and São Sepé in Rio Grande do Sul, in order to expedite newspaper circulation throughout the state. The newspaper states that it has the state's greatest readership and daily printing amounts.

Currently, the paper is available online in PDF format in full. It is one of the few news agencies in the world to offer its newspaper in this format. Issues are available online since 1997. The PDF format paper was offered free of charge until June 2006 when Correio do Povo started to charge a subscription fee for access.

== See also ==
- List of newspapers in Brazil
