= List of programs broadcast by Record News =

This is a list of programs currently and soon to be broadcast by Record News, a Brazilian television news channel.

== Current shows ==
- Agro Record News (2020-present)
- Aldeia News (2007-present)
- Alerta Brasil (2018-present)
- Alerta News (Breaking news reports/coverage, 2007–present)
- Conexão Record News (2020-present)
- Elas com a Bola (2024-present)
- Esporte Record News (2007-2012; 2022-present)
- Estúdio News (2018-present)
- Geek Record News (2021-present)
- Hora News (2007–present)
- Inovação e Negócios (2024-present)
- Joga nas 11 (2024-present)
- Jornal da Record News (2011–present)
- Link Record News (2015-present)
- Momento Moto (2015-present)
- Mulheres Positivas (2025-present)
- Mundo Record News (2007-2012; 2018-present)
- News das 10 (2020-present)
- News das 19 (2022-present)
- Record News Investigação (2020-present)
- Record News Repórter (2020-present)
- Record News Rural (2011–2013; 2014–present)
- Record News Séries (2017-present)
- Ressoar (2008-present)
- Soltando os Bichos (2020-present)
- Tô Aqui com Juliana Herc (2025-present)
- Zapping (2007–present)

=== Reruns of RecordTV's shows ===
- Brasil Caminhoneiro (2020-present)
- Câmera Record (2008-present)
- Cidade Alerta (2020-present)
- Domingo Espetacular (2007–present)
- Esporte Record (2022; 2025-present)
- Jornal da Record (2007–present)

=== Reruns of RecordTV São Paulo's shows ===
- Balanço Geral SP

== Former shows ==
=== News and information ===
- Arquivo Record (2007–2016)
- Câmera Record News (2007–2016)
- Direto da Redação (2007–2012)
- Página 1 (2007–2012)
- Record News Brasil (2007–2012)
- Record News Centro-Oeste (2010-2012)
- Record News Nordeste (2007–2012)
- Record News Paulista (2007–2016)
- Record News São Paulo (2010–2012)
- Record News Sudeste (2007–2012)
- Record News Sul (2007–2012)
- Tempo News (2007–2012)

=== Talk shows ===
- Cartão de Visita (2012)
- Brasília Ao Vivo (2007–2012)
- Economia e Negócios (2007–2012)
- Entrevista Imprevista (2007-2008)
- Entrevista Record (2007–2012)
- Late Show With David Letterman (2012-2016)
- The Tonight Show with Jay Leno (2011–2012)

=== Sports ===
- UEFA Champions League
- UEFA Cup
- UEFA Euro 2008
- 2010 Winter Olympics
- 2012 Summer Olympics
- 2014 Winter Olympics
- 2016 Summer Olympics
- Pan American Games (2011, 2015 and 2019)
- NASCAR Sprint Cup Series (2016–2017) (highlights, Thursdays 10:30 pm)
- International Champions Cup (2018-2019)
- Gol Futebol Arte (2008-2011)

=== Variety ===
- Coisas de Mulher (2007–2012)
- E aí, Doutor? (2012–2013)
- Estilo e Saúde (2007–2012)
- Link Brasil (2008-2011)
- Man vs. Wild (2007–2013)
- Mulheres em Foco (2007–2011)
- NBlogs (2010–2013)
- Receita pra Dois (2009–2012)
