= Record Internacional =

Brazilian international television channel

- Country: Brazil
- Broadcast area: Rest of world
- Network: Record
- Headquarters: United States (US)

Programming
- Language(s): Portuguese

Ownership
- Owner: Grupo Record

History
- Launched: 2002; 23 years ago
- Former names: RecordTV

Links
- Website: recordinternacional.r7.com

Availability

Streaming media
- Sling TV: Internet Protocol television

Record Internacional is a Brazilian pay-TV and free-to-air channel that broadcasts 24 hours via satellite and cable with digital parameters, all in Portuguese. Record Internacional is focused on transmitting programs from Record and Record News, except for independent programs abroad. Present in over 150 countries, Record Internacional is received in the United States, Canada, Puerto Rico and across Europe. In Europe, Record is the only Brazilian television to be broadcast free of charge, without any subscription payment. Transmissions are also sent throughout the African and Asian continents, with emphasis on Portuguese-speaking countries. The network has nine satellite signal distribution channels.

The main offices of the station are located in (United States) Florida, (Europe) Lisbon, Paris.

== Availability ==
Country	Operator(s)	Channel(s)
Angola	TV Cabo and Multichoice	11 (515 HD)
Cape Verde	None (open)	2, 21, 32 and 35
Japan	FiberTV	The logotype of Record gives you access to viewing.
Mozambique	TV Cabo and DSTV	152 and 709
Portugal	Meo, Vodafone and Nos	182 (181 HD), 170 (169 HD) and 171 (177 HD)
Uganda	None (open)	42 UHF
Madagascar	None (open)	TBA

== See also ==
- Record
- Record News
