= Record Europa (subsidiary) =

- Company type: Subsidiary of Record
- Industry: Television
- Headquarters: Lisbon, Portugal
- Products: Television channels
- Owner: Grupo Record
- Parent: Record
- Website: Record Europa

Record Europa is a subsidiary of Record, a Brazilian television network. It produces and distributes Record programming from Brazil in Portugal and Europe.

In Portugal, it distributes three channels. Along with CMTV, Record also showed interest in distributing a free-to-air channel in the Portuguese Digital Terrestrial Television platform.

== Channels ==
- Record Europa general entertainment and news
- Record HD HD simulcast of Record Europa
- Record News mostly a simulcast of Record News in Brazil
