= RecordTV Uganda =

Defunct television channel in Uganda

Record Uganda
- Country: Uganda
- Broadcast area: Uganda
- Headquarters: Kampala

Programming
- Languages: English, Luganda

Ownership
- Owner: Initially Grupo Record (Brazil); later Record Media Group (Kenya)
- Parent: Record Media Group
- Key people: Felix Muranda
- Sister channels: Record Kenya, My Channel Africa, Record News (English)

History
- Launched: September 11, 2006
- Closed: 31 March 2021
- Former names: Record Network

Record Uganda, also known as Record Network, was a free-to-air terrestrial television channel based in Kampala, Uganda. The channel was launched in 2006 as an affiliate of Brazil’s Record television network, under Grupo Record. In the 2010s, management of the station shifted to Record Media Group, a Kenyan media company that later became its parent organisation.

The station primarily broadcast in English, with some programming in Luganda, until its closure in March 2021.

== History ==
RecordTV Uganda began test broadcasts in January 2006, spearheaded by bishop Aroldo Martins, then president of Record Europa, as part of Record’s expansion into Africa. The Brazilian group was simultaneously setting up operations in Cape Verde and Angola.

On 11 September 2006, the channel began by relaying Record Europa before quickly starting local programming. Its first original show, Super Girl Talent Search, launched in December 2006.

By August 2006, Record Network had hired Charles Oimuke, formerly of WBS.

At the end of 2009, the channel lost rights to the series I Do when negotiations began to transfer the format to UBC Television.

On 23 March 2021, reports emerged that RecordTV Uganda had run out of money to pay its employees, with a shutdown scheduled for 31 March. Other reasons cited included declining viewership.

== Parent company ==
In the 2010s, ownership shifted to Record Media Group PLC, a Nairobi-based media and broadcasting company founded by Felix Muranda. Through this restructuring, RecordTV Uganda became part of a wider East African network that included Record TV Kenya, Record TV Africa, and Record News (English).

== See also ==
- Record Media Group PLC
- Record TV Kenya
- Record TV Africa
