= RFTV =

Brazilian television network

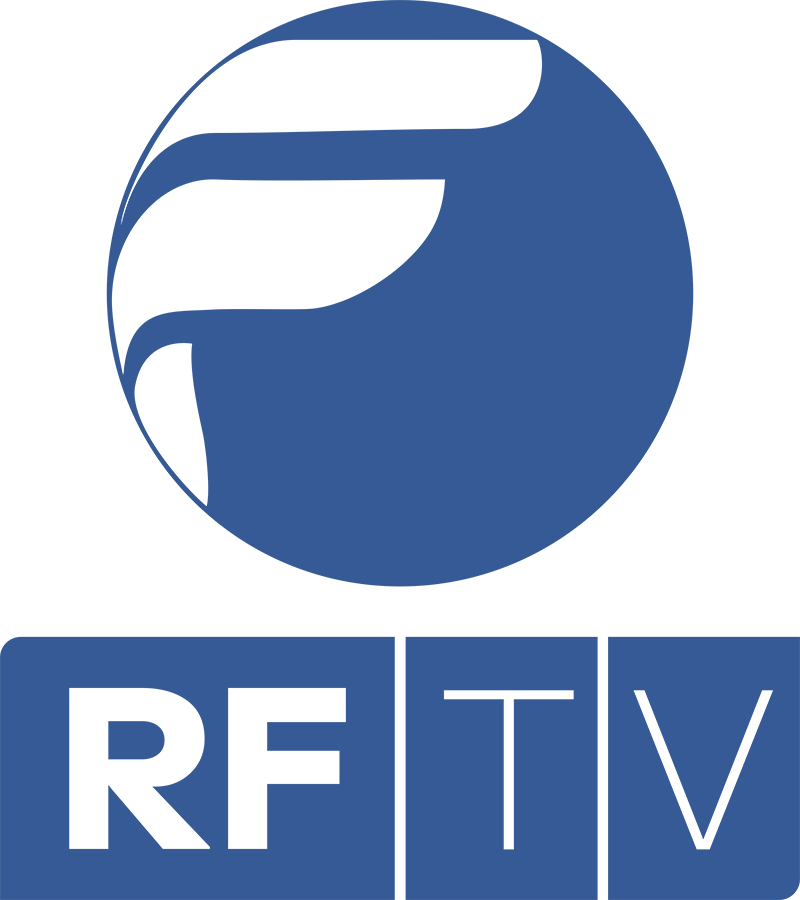
- Type: Free-to-air; Commercial broadcasting Television network
- Country: Brazil
- Headquarters: Campinas, São Paulo, Brazil

Programming
- Language: Portuguese
- Picture format: 1080i HDTV (downscaled to 480i for the SD feed)

Ownership
- Parent: Grupo Record
- Key people: Edir Macedo

History
- Launched: 1 August 1998; 28 years ago
- Founder: Edir Macedo

Links
- Website: recordtv.r7.com

RFTV (acronym for Rede Família de Televisão, literally "Family Television Network", previously named simply as Rede Família, "Family Network") is a Brazilian television network based in Campinas, São Paulo. It is one of the Record Group companies. It was created on August 1, 1998, and currently maintains a programming schedule with journalistic and variety programs, as well as reruns of programs produced by its sister company Record. Its terrestrial coverage covers, in addition to the Metropolitan Region of Campinas, some locations in the interior of São Paulo and scattered cities in the Southeast, North and Northeast regions of the country through relays, as well as national coverage via satellite in C band and Ku band.

== History ==
=== First phase (1998-2011) ===
Rede Família emerged from TV Thathi in Campinas (being licensed in Limeira), until then affiliated with Rede Manchete, which belonged to businessman Chaim Zaher since 1993, and which was acquired by Grupo Record. The new network was inaugurated on August 1, 1998, and initially covered only regions in the interior of São Paulo where there were retransmitters installed by the old administrations. The station initially had 18 hours of programming per day, which was based on news, series, cartoons, independent programs and productions from the Universal Church of the Kingdom of God.

The acquisition of the station took place at the same time that Grupo Record also acquired Rede Mulher, belonging to the Montoro Family. The press even speculated that Rede Família would be generated by the new broadcaster, based in Araraquara, which ended up not happening. On July 6, 1999, the station began transmitting its programming via satellite in C-band, gaining national coverage, replacing CNT-Gazeta's satellite slot. Its programming also started to air in the state of Bahia, through TV Cabrália in Itabuna, also owned by the group, which had been running independent programming since Rede Record's programming had been transferred to TV Itapoan in Salvador. Rede Família also tried to acquire CBI, an infomercial channel belonging to Grupo Objetiva, which would give it a generator in the city of São Paulo, however, the negotiations failed.

The following week, Rede Família launches a new programming schedule, debuting attractions such as the journalistic Alerta Total, similar to Cidade Alerta shown by Rede Record, but with a focus on social assistance reports. Its premiere program featured a report in which quiet believers of an evangelical church complained about the threatening presence of a rapist in the region. With this tactic, Rede Família moved away from the segmented TV model, aimed at evangelical believers, showing programming that was increasingly similar to that offered by other networks. The network also began showing reruns of programs produced by Rede Record, the first of which was the telenovela Estrela de Fogo. Despite efforts to consolidate itself as a second-tier television network, Rede Família was unable to gain visibility, gaining only one (and to date the only) affiliate in its first years of existence, TV Maracá de Boa Vista.

On February 3, 2003, Rede Família ceased having its own schedule and became an affiliate of Rede Mulher.According to the agreement between the parties, Rede Mulher's programming was now broadcast on VHF to the cities of Campinas, Limeira, Piracicaba and Ribeirão Preto, among other cities in the interior of São Paulo, transmitted by Rede Família. Im 2005, Rede Família aired Rede Família Esporte (6:30pm), Debate Bola (7:15pm), Pokemon (5:30pm), Relic Hunter (9:20pm) and Jornal da Rede Família (weeknights at 6pm and Saturdays at 5:30pm). The rest of the programming was IURD and independent spaces and the network did not show its own programming on Sundays. This year, the partnership is dissolved and the networks once again begin to generate programming independent of each other.

=== Second phase (2011-2013) ===
On June 30, 2011, Rede Família ended all of its own productions and replaced them with programs from IURD TV, linked to the Universal Church of the Kingdom of God, which had started broadcasting its web stream in May of that year. On July 20th, it was the turn of the independent productions that were still aired to be removed from schedule, and Rede Família then became a de facto relayer of IURD TV's programming.

=== Third phase (2013-present) ===
On June 24, 2013, Rede Família returned to producing and showing its own programs, starting to repeat programs from its sister network, including the period telenovela Essas Mulheres, in addition to showing foreign series such as Heroes, The Event, Covert Affairs and Law & Order: Los Angeles. The station also started showing reruns of Entrevista Record, from sister channel Record News. In 2014, it aired the telenovela Cidadão Brasileiro. On March 9, 2020, the network returned to showing telenovelas with the second rerun of Cidadão Brasileiro at 2 pm and Pecado Mortal at 7:30 pm. On the same day, Alerta Total gained a new set, starting to be recorded in the old studios of the former program on its sister channel, SP no Ar. On November 9, it re-aired Vidas Cruzadas in place of Pecado Mortal and confirms for January 2021 the rerun of Marcas da Paixão as the successor to Cidadão Brasileiro.

On March 1, 2021, the broadcaster announced changes to the schedule and also the opening of new studios in Campinas. The Morning Edition starts to open its programming schedule at 8:30 am. Programs such as Família Kids, Tá no Ar Campinas, Alerta Total, RF News and the soap operas Marcas da Paixão and Vidas Cruzadas gain new times and the Afternoon Edition leaves the broadcaster's schedule. On the same day, the debut of Ligados no Esporte also takes place, and the live broadcasts of the NBB for the 2020—21 season and the Mercedes-Benz Challenge for the 2021 season are announced.

In September 2023, the broadcaster stopped using the name "Rede Família" and started using only the acronym RFTV. The broadcaster also debuted a new logo, no longer using textures from sister network RecordTV.
