= Kiss FM (Portugal) =

Coordinates: 37.089695°N 8.240083°W

KISSFM

Portugal
- Broadcast area: Portugal
- Frequencies: Portugal 95.8 MHz; Algarve 101.2 MHz

Programming
- Languages: English, Portuguese.
- Format: Pop music, Contemporary hit radio, news, entertainment, speech, showbiz, Dance Music, Electronic music,

Ownership
- Owner: Global Difusion, SGPS, SA

History
- First air date: 1992

Links
- Website: https://www.kissfm.pt/

Kiss FM is a Portuguese commercial radio station established by Paul Buick in 1992 and is currently owned by Global Difusion, a company sustained by Edir Macedo.

== Description ==
The station is licensed within Portugal to broadcast in the English language (as the only such station to broadcast in the language) and its target audience is the immigrant community in the Algarve area of Portugal. The station broadcasts from studios Albufeira. Kiss FM is the home of the Kiss FM Breakfast Show. The flagship show on the station is currently hosted by Si Frater since 2012 and celebrated 12 years on air on January 2, 2024. The motto of the Breakfast Show is "Getting you where you're going with a smile on your face". Due to the passing of Spike Hammond on the weekend of 18th Dec 2023 Kiss ruan 4 hours of non stop hits which after this Mark SEBBO Sebastian who is a veteran of radio with over 45 years experience under his belt takes over from 4 till 8pm.

Over the weekend Kiss FM has some specialist show for you including GHR ( Ghetto House radio ) from the US with Hozer on a Saturday night from 10 till midnight. Sundays have Owen Gee and the Solid Gold Sunday Show 9 till 1pm and then to finish the live shows on the weekend it is back to Si Frater for the Sunday Drive from 6 till 7pm.

Global Difusion acquired the station from its founder in 2010, the acquisition was concluded in January 2011.

The station resumed its broadcasts in Lisbon from 1 November 2013 replacing Global Diffusion's secondary outlet in the city, 95FM, the relay ended in May 2017 and was replaced by Rádio Positiva, which until then was the UCKG's Portuguese web radio station.

== Gallery ==
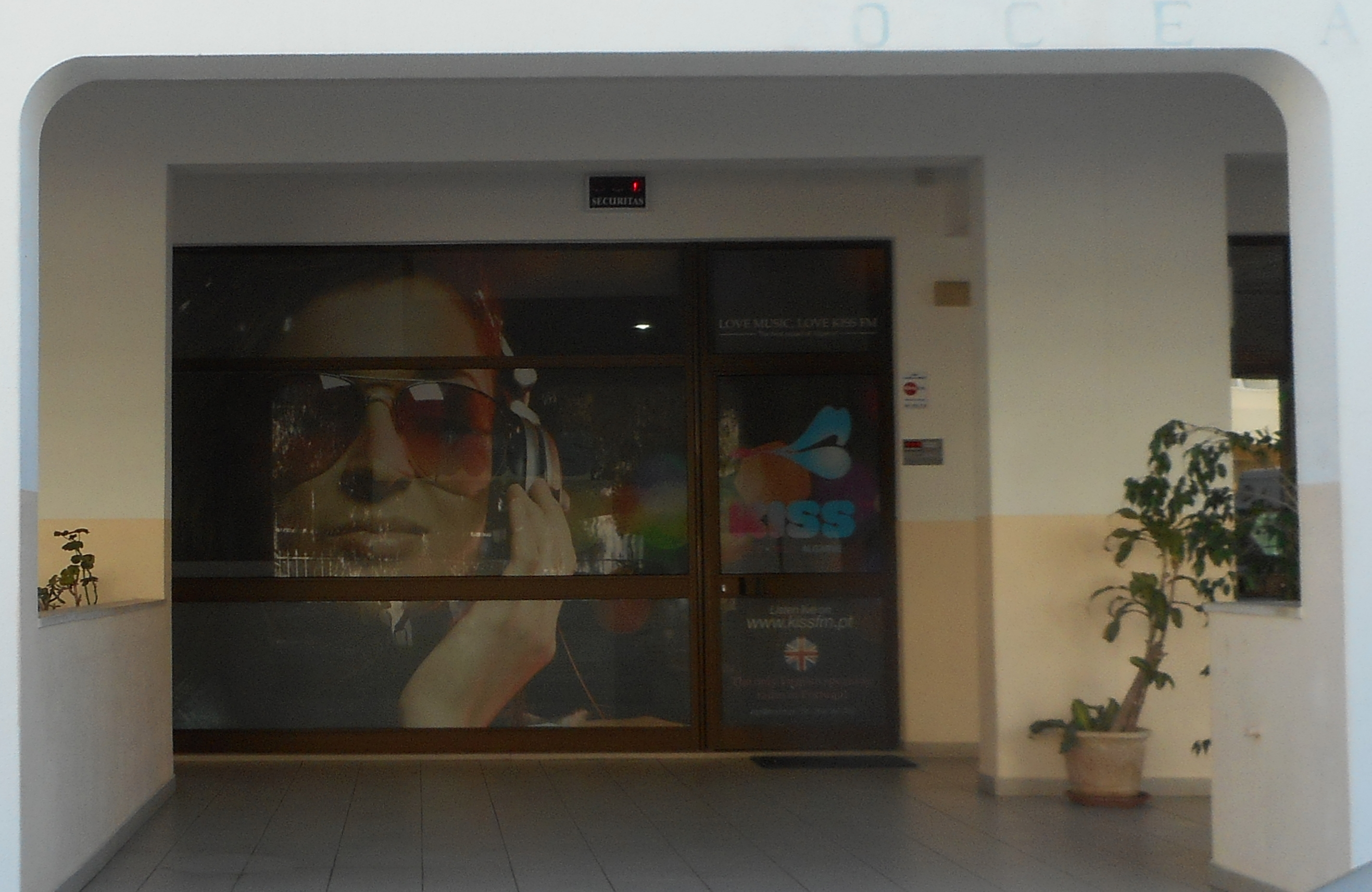
The studio in Albufeira

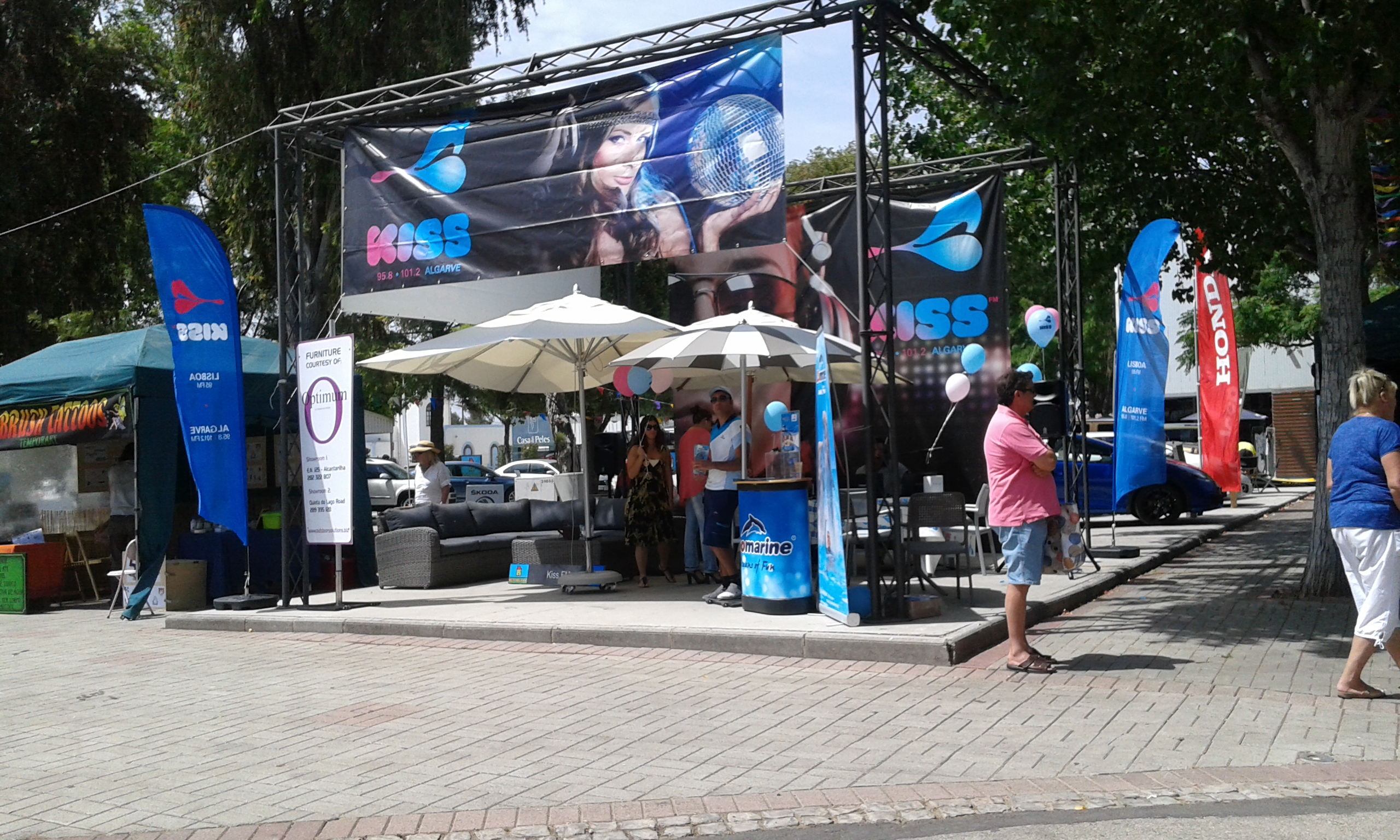
Outside broadcast in 2015
