= Record Europa =

Record
- Country: Portugal
- Broadcast area: Portugal, Europe

Programming
- Picture format: 1080i HDTV (downscaled to 16:9 576i for the SDTV feed)

Ownership
- Owner: Record Europa (Record)
- Sister channels: Record News

History
- Launched: 1 October 2005

Record Europa is a Portuguese pay television channel owned by Record, a Brazilian television network. Its programming is mostly taken from the Brazilian network. It provides general entertainment, telenovelas, Brazilian reality TV shows, and news. The channel also produces a limited amount of local content. Similar to what happens in Brazil, Record's main competitor is Globo Portugal. Igreja Universal do Reino de Deus religious programming is transmitted at late nights.

Much like non-Brazilian stations using the RecordTV branding, the channel isn't directly owned by Grupo Record, but rather by Aion Future Holding, a figurehead company registered in Portugal set up by Edir Macedo.

== History ==
Rede Record has been operating in Portugal since at least 2000 through Record Internacional. On 3 October 2003 a separate company for Europe was set up (Rede Record de Televisão - Europa Ltda) with Edir's Rádio e Televisão Record controlling 99.98% of the shares. By February 2004, work for the Lisbon subsidiary was already underway, with the channel being available to subscription television operators in Portugal, Spain and the United Kingdom. The aim of the company was to amp up distribution and advertising and subscriber revenue in European markets.

On 19 October 2005 Record Europa finally announced that the Lisbon offices were to open on 1 November with the blessing of UCKG bishop Aroldo Martins, who was appointed as the international chief of operations for the network. Lisbon was selected as the site of the European headquarters because of its linguistical inheritance, but also because the UCKG already had a solid presence in the city. With the Lisbon facilities, Record was now able to produce content from six studios, two of which with hi-tech standards for the time. For the launch of the new base, the channel held a special event with Tom Cavalcante (presenter of Show do Tom) as its biggest attraction. A number of Brazilian celebrities working for the network, including actress Bianca Rinaldi (who portrayed Isaura in the network's adaptation of Isaura the Slave Girl, airing on RTP1 at the time) were present. Before moving to the new building, the channel produced at least four programs.

In February 2006, Martins finished a round of negotiations with TV Cabo, enabling the channel to be available to a wider subscriber base. Up until then, the channel was only carried on Cabovisão and the local operators (TVTel, Bragatel and Pluricanal). These tactics emulated those of its parent network in Brazil, of aiming to surpass the larger networks, especially Globo. Record's connections to the UCKG were often downplayed, claiming that, at the time, 21 hours of its schedule were secular and only the remaining three were religious. Aroldo Martins joked at the downplaying by saying that "we are about as religious as TVI". A second European production facility opened in London in February 2006. The four-floor facility consisted of two studios, an editing room and a news unit allowing live news links to Brazil. The month before, Record opened a channel in Uganda (closed down in 2021) and was on the verge of opening channels in Cape Verde and Angola. Martins claimed that Record was now among the ten most-watched cable channels in Portugal and that it was the only Portuguese-speaking channel available on the Sky platform in the UK.

The upsizing and agreement with TV Cabo practically implied the end of contract Globosat had with the provider since April 1998, as GNT, one of the most-viewed cable networks, was running the risk of shutting down on 31 March, to be replaced by Record Europa. Negotiations have been running since the start of 2006 but were raised by heavy suspicions of the possible Record takeover. The suspicions were confirmed when Record announced near the end of March that it would take over GNT's former slot on all TV Cabo services (analog, digital, satellite)
