= Rede Mulher =

Brazilian television channel

- Type: Free-to-air commercial television network
- Country: Brazil
- Availability: Nationwide
- Founded: August 8, 1994; 32 years ago by Roberto Montoro
- Headquarters: Araraquara, SP, Brazil
- Broadcast area: 21 states in the Brazilian territory
- Owner: Edir Macedo Bezerra
- Parent: Grupo Record
- Launch date: August 8, 1994; 32 years ago
- Dissolved: September 28, 2007
- Former names: TV Morada do Sol Ltda. (1979–1994)
- Official website: https://wayback.archive.org/web/*/http://www.redemulher.com.br/
- Language: Portuguese
- Replaced: Rede Família
- Replaced by: Record News

Rede Mulher was a Brazilian free-to-air television network founded on August 8, 1994. Though the broadcast was made from the city of Araraquara, in the central region of the state of São Paulo, all of its television productions was produced in the network's studios in the capital, São Paulo. Since the channel's debut, the IBOPE (measure of channel popularity) has been relatively low. In 1999, it was acquired by bishop João Batista Ramos da Silva of the Universal Church of the Kingdom of God, president of Rede Família.

== History ==
Founded by Roberto Montoro, Rede Mulher opened on August 8, 1994, due to the success of Rádio Mulher, a female-oriented radio station in São Paulo, whose programming consisted largely of hobbies of female interest. At Rádio Mulher, one of its most iconic personalities was Hebe Camargo, who worked at the station from 1976 to 1980, during her four-year hiatus, after leaving TV Tupi and before being hired by TV Bandeirantes. The station succeeded TV Morada do Sol, based in Araraquara in São Paulo's interior. Its creation was announced in July that year, aiming to launch in the first week of August, with its signal reaching about 100 municipalities in the state. At the time, the channel's financial department calcultaed that US$1 million were to be used for its launch. Operating from small studios in the Granja Julieta neighborhood, Rede Mulher had most of its programming aired live, with programs such as Com Sabor, running for over three hours, showing recipes. In addition, some programs were produced from Araraquara, such as its news bulletins, such as A Mulher é Notícia, presented by Andreia Reis. The rest of its line-up consisted of feature films and TV series.

The station has a small audience at the beginning, being ignored by some sectors of the public. Beginning in 1996, the channel started increasing its array of programs, presenting independent home shopping productions, such as Shop Tour, as well as ethnic programming, such as Shalom Brasil and others. In April 1999, it was announced that bishop João Batista Ramos da Silva, then president of Rede Família, had finished a contract to buy the channel. Rede Família's share in the channel was set at 50%. The acquisition was seen as means for Rede Família to reach greater São Paulo, which it had no coverage, but was denied by Rede Mulher director Mário Tadeu. From May, Rede Família would be seen on Rede Mulher's frequencies between 12am and 2:30am. Upon the takeover, the UCKG removed all programs that did not meet its beliefs: the first programs that were cancelled were the ones aimed at the Jewish community, while at the same time, Umbandists that had segments on the channel's programs were fired. Clodovil Hernandes' program, Clodovil, was also cancelled. The overnight schedule, between 12am and 2:30am, was occupied by Rede Família's programs.

Shortly after the purchase of the network, Edir Macedo moved the headquarters of Rede Mulher to the old Rede Record premises, at Miruna Avenue, in Moema — unoccupied since the network moved to the Barra Funda neighborhood in 1995, when it took over the CBI premises and transmitter. From there, structural investments in the channel began. In September 2000, Rede Mulher invested US$500.000 in the acquisition of a new digital capture and completion system, reworked its studios and launched new programs. In early 2001, a news department was created and new news programs started.

In mid-December 2004, Rede Mulher had to answer a lawsuit in the 5th Federal Civil Court, for showing programs of the Universal Church of the Kingdom of God that "demonize Afro-Brazilian religions, such as candomblé and umbanda" because they be referred to with terms such as "backrest," "demons," "witchcraft" and "witchcraft". Rede Mulher stated that the "programs are the responsibility of those who produce them." The channel was accused of racism along with Rede Record.

With low IBOPE, Rede Record developed a project for a future 24-hour news channel entitled Record News, between the end of 2006 and the beginning of 2007. With the expansion of Rede Mulher into hundreds of Brazilian municipalities, it was defined that the broadcaster would give way to the new one as soon as it was launched. At midnight on September 27, 2007, Rede Mulher went offline after the Realidade Atual program, when it was officially replaced by Record News with the exhibition of a countdown to 8 pm on September 27, when TV Record São Paulo turned 54. After that, Rede Mulher's was mostly dismissed.
