= CN23 =

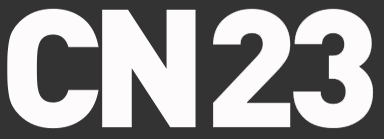
- Type: Free-to-air television channel
- Country: Argentina
- Broadcast area: Argentina; International
- Headquarters: Buenos Aires, Argentina

Programming
- Language: Spanish
- Picture format: 1080i HDTV (downscaled to 576i/480i for the SD feed)

Ownership
- Owner: Soluciones Logísticas S.A.

History
- Launched: May 10, 2010
- Closed: November 25, 2020
- Replaced by: Unife

Availability

Terrestrial
- Digital UHF: Channel 25.1

CN23 (Cultura y Noticias 23) was an Argentine news channel owned by Soluciones Logísticas S.A. as one of the new channels following the passing of the new Media Law. Initially owned by Grupo 23, the channel was acquired by Grupo Indalo in February 2016, and later, in 2019, to the Universal Church of the Kingdom of God, alongside 360 TV. The channel ceased broadcasting on November 25, 2020, being replaced by Unife's definitive service.

== History ==
The passing of Law nº. 26522 enabled the creation of digital terrestrial television and the creation of new channels for the platform. Its primary aim was to offer "diversity and the construction of an alternative agenda" to the existing news channels, not only giving airtime to news of national interest, but also to indigenous populations, co-operatives and peasants. The channel was founded by Sergio Szpolski and was owned by Grupo 23, who also owned the Infonews portal, newspaper Tiempo Argentino and Radio América (AM 1190). Matías Garfunkel bought 50% of the group's shares in February 2011.

The first test broadcasts were made in March 2010 via online streaming. The number 23 was a reference to its potential channel slot. By August, the channel's regular service was already being carried on the digital terrestrial platform.

The channel was seen with caution from opposition politicians and Grupo Clarín's Cablevisión, the latter of which initially rejected the inclusion of the channel, giving a ten-day period to add the channel. TeleRed was adverted to do the same within a fifteen-day window. Cablevisión only added the channel on September 17, 2011, on its digital service.

On February 10, 2016, the channel was sold to Grupo Indalo alongside its newspaper El Argentino and 50% of its shares in Vorterix, through an exchange of shares with the previous shareholdersof this companies who started to have a minority interest in Indalo Media who maintains the majority, with over 90% of the shares and, as consequence maintaining majority control.

On August 29, 2016, the channel relaunched its graphical identity and its programming, as well as starting its broadcasts from the Ideas del Sur studio complex and a change to its format, aiming more to Buenos Aires Province.

Due to the financial crisis the channel was suffering, as well as its low ratings, on August 1, 2017, it announced its closure as a news channel to air "canned" content from other channels, after the channel announced the voluntary firing of its news team.

On September 1, 2019, DirecTV Argentina removed CN23 and 360 TV, without a replacement. In November, the Universal Church of the Kingdom of God started occupying the channel, after doing so with 360 TV in September. After a year in this situation, on November 23, 2020, CN23's bandwidth was given over to Unife, which had been operational since 2019.
