= TMT (TV channel) =

Trochę Młodsza Telewizja
- Country: Poland

Programming
- Picture format: 4:3 SDTV

Ownership
- Owner: CK!TV

History
- Launched: 23 May 1998
- Closed: 23 June 2008

TMT (Trochę Młodsza Telewizja) was a Polish television channel operational 23 May 1998 to 23 June 2008, being replaced that day by Lato 2008, which ran until 30 September 2008. It was delivered using the Amos 1 satellite in digital encryption, and was largely available on cable companies, where it found its audience.

== History ==
TMT started broadcasting on 23 May 1998, being owned by International Movie Productions TV Ltd., owned by Czesław Kłak. In its first four years, it was on the Cyfra+ platform and was available on the Hot Bird satellite. On 19 March 2002, due to divregences between the channel and Cyfra+, it left Hot Bird on 13°E and moved to the Amos 1 satellite.. The channel was an entertainment service, with foreign films and series, Polish cartoons and its own productions, as well as music programming.

In March 2007, SpaceCom, operator of the Amos 1 satellite, informed the channel that it was using the satellite illegally. In 2008, it was reported that the channel was broadcasting without a valid license, which was not renewed on 11 March 2008, the day its contract expired. Copyright association ZAiKS was in favor of the decision, as it was airing content that was protected by rights, such as music videos, but KRRiT was against it.

Czesław Kłak, through his new company CK!TV, launched a new version of the channel, under the name Lato 2008 (Summer of 2008) using the Telstar 12 satellite; To & Owo and cable company Toya informed about it. The channel launched on 23 June 2008, though it was initially set to launch two weeks earlier, on 9 June. The programming mix was similar to TMT, but aired a higher volume of Polish cartoons. The channel closed on 30 September 2008; the reasons are not clear, but it was suspected that it faced legal or technical problems, like TMT before.
