= O Dia =

Daily newspaper in Rio de Janeiro, Brazil

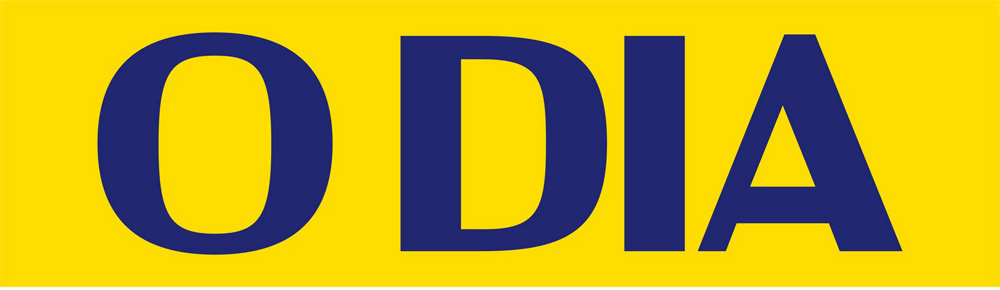
- Type: Daily newspaper
- Format: Broadsheet
- Owner(s): Grupo O Dia (Grupo Record)
- Editor: Bruno Ferreira
- Founded: 5 June 1951
- Headquarters: R. dos Inválidos, 198 - Centro, Rio de Janeiro, Brazil
- Website: odia.ig.com.br

O Dia (The Day) is a major daily newspaper in Rio de Janeiro, Brazil. Its sales are slightly higher than its main rival, O Globo. In August 2012, it was sold to Grupo Record.

== History ==
The newspaper was founded on 5 June 1951 by the then deputy Chagas Freitas, future governor of the states of Guanabara and Rio de Janeiro.

Chagas used graphic equipment evening The News (owned by São Paulo former Governor Ademar de Barros) to run the newspaper. Chagas was a partner and political ally of Ademar at the time.

At the time of the coup d'état in Brazil in 1964, the newspaper published an article published on 2 April of that year, which stated:

The population of Copacabana took to the streets in true carnival, saluting army troops. Rains chopped papers fell from the windows of the buildings as the people gave vent, in the streets, their contentment

— O Dia

In 1983, O Dia was purchased by journalist and entrepreneur Ary Carvalho. Initially a strong popular appeal newspaper, facing police and violence news, the newspaper underwent extensive renovation in the early 1990s, with the intention to compete for readers with more traditional Jornal do Brasil and O Globo.

With the death of Ary Carvalho in 2003, the company's property was divided between his three daughters: Ariane, Gigi and Eliane de Carvalho.

In 2005, Ariane has left the company to found the newspaper Q !, bringing together radio MPB FM.

At this point, the Company Dia also included the newspaper Meia Hora, the website O Dia Online, O Dia TV and FM Radio Dia, as well as a news agency and Ary Carvalho Institute. In April 2010 Editora O Dia sold part of its capital to EJESA, Company Journalistic Econômico SA, which publishes the business newspaper Brasil Econômico, for $75 million.

Now the EJESA, Editora Day launches sports MarcaCampeão - in partnership with the leading Spanish newspaper Marca.
