= Unife (TV channel) =

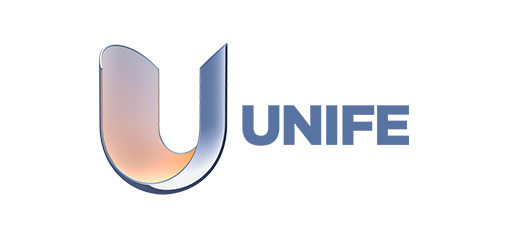
- Type: Free-to-air television channel
- Country: Argentina
- Broadcast area: Argentina; International
- Headquarters: Buenos Aires, Argentina

Programming
- Language: Spanish
- Picture format: 1080i HDTV (downscaled to 576i/480i for the SD feed)

Ownership
- Owner: Universal Church of the Kingdom of God

History
- Launched: 25 November 2019
- Replaced: CN23

Links
- Website: www.unifetv.com

Availability

Terrestrial
- Digital UHF: Channel 25.1

Unife is an Argentine over-the-air television channel owned by the Universal Church of the Kingdom of God. Programming on the station includes religious and secular offerings. It started broadcasting in November 2019, using the bandwidth of the former CN23 news network.

International versions of the channel exist in Chile and Mexico.

== History ==
The UCKG had a long history in the Argentine media landscape dating back to its arrival to the country in the 1990s, with slots on radio and television. In 2003, UCKG bishop for Argentina Ricardo Cis became the license holder of Radio Buenos Aires. It aired a program on América TV before sign-off and was interested in buying shares in Canal 9.

Unife started broadcasting on 25 November 2019 using the CN23 slot on digital terrestrial television, as well as that of 360 TV, another channel created as part of the push for digital terrestrial television under Kirchnerism. This enabled the UCKG to increase its program production capabilities. Precisely on the same day, the channel was included in Enacom's licensing plans. Regular broadcasts began on November 23, 2020, putting an end to CN23.

On 23 November 2021, Unife unveiled a new identity, coinciding with its first anniversary on air. The goal of the rebrand was to bring families closer to television. The channel was airing two Biblical novelas from the Record network, Apocalipse and Moisés e os Dez Mandamentos. It had also acquired a raft of titles from the Sony Pictures Entertainment catalog for the Cine Unife Max strand, among them: Blade Runner 2049, The Dark Tower, Angry Birds, The Emoji Movie, Sicario: Day of the Soldado; Terminator: Salvation and The Equalizer. That same month, it started uplinking its signal to satellite, encrypted, for usage on cable operators in the inland.

In 2023, the channel had 17 hours of live programming on weekdays, as well as plans to launch it in other countries.

== Programming ==
Most of its weekday programming is produced live from its Buenos Aires studios, including its news service, La voz de la ciudad, as well as live talk shows A la mesa contentos (cooking show) and ATR: A Todo Ritmo (youth show).

Proposals were being made for a "Disney-style" kids show in July 2023, as well as the acquisition of further foreign content and new original productions featuring Elba Rodríguez, winner of the first Argentine MasterChef, who already hosted a morning program on the channel.
