= Trimethylthiazoline =

Names
- Preferred IUPAC name 2,4,5-Trimethyl-2,5-dihydro-1,3-thiazole
- Other names: 2,4,5-Trimethyl-3-thiazoline; Fox odor

Identifiers
| CAS Number | 60633-24-1 |
| 3D model (JSmol) | Interactive image |
| ChemSpider | 157721 |
| PubChem CID | 181287 |
| CompTox Dashboard (EPA) | DTXSID50976064 |
- InChI: InChI=1S/C6H11NS/c1-4-5(2)8-6(3)7-4/h5-6H,1-3H3 Key: AIVVNNYXOSPRCW-UHFFFAOYSA-N
- SMILES: N1=C(C)C(SC1C)C

Properties
| Chemical formula | C_{6}H_{11}NS |
| Molar mass | 129.22 g·mol^{−1} |
| Appearance | Light yellow liquid |
| Odor | Meaty, nutty, onion-like (Note: Some sources instead describe the odor of TMT as "powerfully acrid" or "extremely repugnant ... potentially capable of inducing nausea".) |
- Except where otherwise noted, data are given for materials in their standard state (at 25 °C [77 °F], 100 kPa). (what is ?) Infobox references

Trimethylthiazoline (TMT; sometimes called fox odor; systematic name 2,4,5-trimethyl-2,5-dihydro-1,3-thiazole), (Note: Some sources instead identify TMT with the isomer 4145-93-1 2,4,5-trimethyl-4,5-dihydro-1,3-thiazole, or claim that 2,4,5-trimethyl-2,5-dihydro-1,3-thiazole and 2,4,5-trimethyl-4,5-dihydro-1,3-thiazole are alternate names for the same chemical.) is a constituent of fox feces that may be an innately aversive odor to rodents. The chemical is liquid at room temperature and has a very light yellow color that darkens on exposure to oxygen over time.

== Sources ==
TMT was first isolated from cooked beef in 1977, and has been identified also in non-animal material such as wheat flour extrudates. It was identified in fox feces by Vernet-Maury in 1980.

== Effects ==
Vernet-Maury reported that TMT is effective at inducing antipredator behavior in rats.

TMT has been called an "innate threat stimulus" because of how it "induces a number of fear and defensive behaviors" in naive mice and rats.

Not all research has come to the same conclusions, however; with some questioning the role of TMT in the aversive effects of fox feces, or reporting that TMT was only rarely present in fox feces. One study, for example, found that cat odor, but not TMT, elicits specific defensive behaviors in rats.

Immunoprecipitation of RNA transcripts of murine olfactory cells have identified an enriched pool of odorant receptors activated by TMT, including five receptors (Olfr20, Olfr30, Olfr57, Olfr376, Olfr491) that localize to the dorsal portion of the olfactory epithelium which can mediate fear behaviour.
