= Unife (Mexican TV network) =

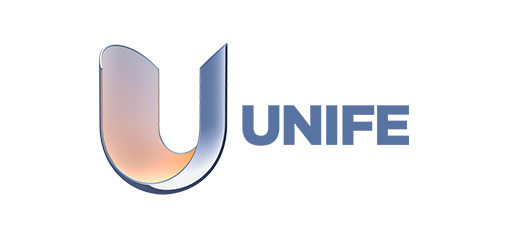
- Country: Mexico
- Transmitters: 20 (Main station XHFAMX-TDT and 19 Canal 13 stations)
- Headquarters: Mexico City

Programming
- Language: Spanish
- Picture format: 1080i HDTV

Ownership
- Owner: Medios Hipertextuales, S.A. de C.V.

History
- Founded: 22 November 2022
- Launched: 28 January 2023

Links
- Webcast: video.unife.mx
- Website: unife.mx

Availability

Terrestrial
- Digital terrestrial television (Mexico City): Channel 8.3 (HD)
- Digital terrestrial television (Southeastern Mexico): Channel 13.2 (SD)

Unife (styled as UNIFE, an acronym for "Unique Family Entertainment") is a national broadcast television network in Mexico. Owned by Medios Hipertextuales, S.A. de C.V., the network provides generalist programming aimed at the family audience. The Universal Church of the Kingdom of God (UCKG) is among the network's programming clients. Modeled after the original Unife channel in Argentina, it broadcasts as a subchannel on XHFAMX-TDT in Mexico City and on the Canal 13 network in southeastern Mexico.

== History ==
On 22 November 2022, the Federal Telecommunications Institute (IFT) authorized the addition of channel 8.3 to the XHFAMX-TDT multiplex in Mexico City, operated by El Heraldo de México. The authorization was granted to provide a generalist programming service, differentiating it from purely religious broadcasters. The channel officially launched on 28 January 2023. Its slogan, "Televisión que une a la familia" (Television that unites the family), reflects its focus on family-oriented content.

=== Expansion ===
On 4 September 2024, Unife expanded its coverage significantly by launching on subchannel 13.2 of the Canal 13 network (owned by Telsusa). This agreement extended the network's reach to nineteen additional transmitters. This expansion allowed the network to cover key states in southeastern Mexico, including Yucatán, Campeche, Tabasco, Chiapas, and Quintana Roo.

=== Digital Platforms ===
In addition to its terrestrial broadcast, Unife operates a streaming platform at video.unife.mx in partnership with Ottera, providing on-demand access to its programming. The network also offers a mobile application called "Unife México" available on iOS and Android devices, allowing viewers to watch live broadcasts and on-demand content on smartphones and tablets.

== Programming ==
Unife features a general entertainment format marketed under the "Unique Family Entertainment" brand. The network's programming includes news, talk shows, lifestyle content, children's programming, sports, and international fiction series.

=== News and Information ===
The network produces multiple daily news programs:

- Noticias 360 – News program with multiple editions throughout the day
- UNIFE NEWS – Evening news broadcast
- La Voz de la Ciudad – Evening news and current affairs program
- Mañana Latina – Morning news and lifestyle program

=== Children's Programming ===
- UNIFE KIDS – Children's programming block airing multiple times daily, including one hour of daily content from Edye TV

=== Talk Shows and Lifestyle ===
Unife broadcasts several original talk and lifestyle programs:

- Aquí Nomás – Talk show
- Famosos Sin Censura (Celebrities Uncensored) – Entertainment news and celebrity interviews
- Lo Más Viral (The Most Viral) – Program featuring viral content and trending topics
- Problemas & Soluciones (Problems & Solutions) – Problem-solving program

=== Reality and Documentary ===
- Retratos de Familia (Family Portraits) – Family-focused reality programming
- Venciendo la Crisis (Overcoming the Crisis) – Documentary series
- Mundos Ocultos (Hidden Worlds) – Documentary programming
- Casos Imposibles (Impossible Cases) – Reality documentary series

=== Sports ===
The network broadcasts international sports content, including:

- Queens League - España – Spanish women's football league
- Kings League - España – Spanish football league
- Fútbol Italiano (Italian Football) – Italian football coverage

=== Fiction ===
Unife broadcasts a variety of international fiction content through partnerships with major studios and distributors.

==== Drama Series ====
- Heartland – Canadian family drama (Seasons 1–9)
- Touched by an Angel – American drama series
- SEAL Team – American military drama from Paramount
- Go, vive a tu manera – Argentine musical drama
- Corazón Salvaje – Drama series from Sato Company

==== Telenovelas and Serial Drama ====
From Seriella:

- Jesús – Biblical drama series
- Reyes – Serial novela

From Latin American producers:

- Amar y vivir – Colombian series from Caracol Televisión (premiered 30 January 2023)
- La reina de Indias y el conquistador – Colombian series from Caracol (premiered 3 February 2023)
- Amor sin igual – Brazilian series from Record TV (premiered 19 June 2023)
- Mujercitas – Peruvian drama series

==== Children's Animation ====
Through a partnership with Mediawan:

- Chaplin – Animated comedy series
- Super 4 – Animated adventure series based on Playmobil
- Pinocchio and Friends (Pinocchio Enchanted Village) – Animated series
- Robin Hood: Mischief in Sherwood – Animated adventure series

=== Film ===
Unife broadcasts feature films through content agreements with major studios:

- Sony Pictures – Weekend film programming featuring titles from the Sony library
- Various action, drama, and family films throughout the weekly schedule
