= Transporte, Multiplexação e Transmissão =

Transporte, Multiplexação e Transmissão is a company with joint Mozambican and Chinese capitals that exploites the Mozambican digital terrestrial television network. Its shareholders are Televisão de Moçambique and Rádio Moçambique, both companies owned by the Mozambican state, Chinese company StarTimes (already present in the country on satellite) and Hantex International Co. Ltd., a company registered in Mauritius.

TMT offers a hybrid system, featuring a free-to-air package of channels and a subscription package. The channels in the latter are provided by StarTimes.

== History ==
Mozambique adopted the DVB-T2 standard in December 2010. TMT was formed for this purpose in 2015. On 27 February 2017, the government received a US$156 million loan from Exim Bank.

The TMT platform was formally launched on 8 October 2020 by president Filipe Nyusi and its decoders were already available on the market, with a free package of 16 channels and a subscription package with international channels. On 17 February 2021, Fred Jossias' A Tua TV launched on the free package.

== Criticism ==
In September 2021, when the analog signals were being switched off in Maputo, the first complaints from TMT subscribers emerged, where they reported that their decoders did not work. Celestino Joanguete, in his book “A Migração Para a Televisão Digital em Moçambique: Processo, Modelo de Negócios e Conflitos”, noted that TMT's business model evolved from being a public service to a commercial one, and defended the public model for the service to be used for all consumers.

On 13 August 2024, TMT removed STV from its line-up, which Grupo SOICO referred to as being from "higher orders". After an intervention from MISA Mozambique, STV returned on 16 August.
