= Record News =

Brazilian television network

Coordinates: 23.525°S 46.662°W

- Type: Broadcast television network
- Country: Brazil
- Broadcast area: Worldwide • Americas
- Stations: Record News SP; Record News SC
- Headquarters: São Paulo, Brazil

Programming
- Language: Portuguese
- Picture format: 480i (SDTV); 1080i (HDTV)

Ownership
- Owner: Grupo Record
- Parent: Record; Rede Família
- Key people: Luiz Cláudio Costa (CEO)

History
- Launched: 27 September 2007
- Founder: Edir Macedo
- Replaced: Rede Mulher
- Former names: TV Morada do Sol; Rede Mulher

Links
- Website: r7.com/recordnews

Availability

Terrestrial
- List: 15 UHF (Fortaleza); 18 UHF (Recife); 19 UHF (Porto Alegre); 22 UHF (São Luís); 28 UHF (Cuiabá); 31 UHF (Florianópolis); 32 UHF (Salvador); 35 UHF (Araraquara and Manaus); 40 UHF (Vitória); 43 UHF (São Paulo); 45 UHF (Brasília); 46 UHF (Curitiba); 49 UHF (Campo Grande); 50 UHF (Belo Horizonte)

Record News (formerly known as Rede Mulher) is the first 24-hour free-to-air terrestrial news channel in Brazil, and the third Brazilian news channel to be launched after GloboNews and BandNews TV. It is owned by Grupo Record.

== History ==
In 2006, Edir Macedo announced plans to create a new national network, using Rede Mulher's transmitter network, named Record News, to replace the network in late 2006 or early 2007.

As the parent network celebrated its 54th anniversary, a new channel was launched. This is the first Brazilian free-to-air and terrestrial news channel. The on-air button was pushed at 8:15pm (Brasília time) by then-president Luiz Inácio Lula da Silva and Edir Macedo, the network's owner.

Through the Record Europa subsidiary, Record News is widely available across digital platforms in Portugal. It is mostly a simulcast of Record News in Brazil, with some local content.

=== Programming ===
Reality shows/Game shows

- Car Motor Show
- Duelo de Salões
- X Smile Brasil

== Controversy ==
Two days prior to the launch of Record News, the Vice-President of Organizações Globo, Evandro Guimarães, went to Brasília to meet government officials, including the Communications Minister, Hélio Costa, accusing Rede Record of owning two television networks, Rede Record and Record News, inside the city of São Paulo. In Brazilian law, it is illegal to own more than one television station in a city.

When Guimarães's trip to Brasília was revealed in a blog owned by the newspaper Folha de S. Paulo, Rede Record attacked Rede Globo in an editorial in its national news broadcast, Jornal da Record, accusing Rede Globo of trying to rescue its monopoly on the media and news, and also claiming that Rede Globo was afraid of Record News because Rede Globo, which owns its own news channel Globo News, which is only a payable cable channel, would lose advertising revenue from Globo News to Record News. Rede Record also said that Record News was located outside the city of São Paulo, so Record News was broadcasting legitimately. Rede Record also mentioned Rede Globo's past dealings which could be considered illegal and a crime in Brazilian law, and Rede Globo's relationship with Brazil's military dictatorship. Rede Globo responded to Rede Record's attack by saying it had no merits, it had no proof that Rede Globo had done anything illegal in the past, and Rede Record was just jealous of Rede Globo's high ratings.

== YouTube hijacking ==
In July 2025, during a broadcast of their news program on YouTube, the signal was hijacked to show an infamous Creepypasta called The Wyoming Incident, an ARG created by an unknown person. Several days later, people began commenting on the hijacking online.

== Slogans ==
- 2007–2014: Jornalismo 24 horas de plantão (Journalism 24 hours on call)
- 2014–2016: A líder em notícias (The leader in news)
- 2016–2022: Informação para você crescer (Information for you to grow)
- 2022–present: Informação é tudo (Information is everything)
