= Grupo Record =

Brazilian mass media company

Rádio e Televisão Record S/A
- Trade name: Grupo Record
- Company type: Private
- Industry: Media conglomerate
- Founded: 9 November 1989; 36 years ago
- Founder: Edir Bezerra Macedo
- Headquarters: São Paulo, Brazil
- Area served: Worldwide
- Key people: Marcus Vinícius Vieira (CEO)
- Products: Television networks; Radio stations; Internet services; Newspapers; Music industry
- Brands: Record; Record News; RFTV; Rádio Record; Correio do Povo; Hoje em Dia; O Dia; R7
- Services: Financial services
- Revenue: ▼RS$ 2,250 billion (2013)
- Number of employees: 9,000
- Website: Record IR website

Grupo Record is the third largest media company in Brazil, the company owns several television stations such as Record and Record News, was founded in November 1989 and belongs to the businessman and bishop Edir Macedo.

== History ==
Since the launch of Record News, SKY Brasil and Claro TV+, pressured by Grupo Globo, have opposed the inclusion of the channel in their packages. The channel was forced to be included on SKY, which is controlled by Grupo Globo. On Claro TV+, after strong pressure from Grupo Record, the channel was included.

In 2011, the "fast-paced" moves made by the Universal Church of the Kingdom of God to buy broadcasting stations throughout Brazil in the 1990s were criticized by the Federal Public Prosecutor's Office. The allegation was that Grupo Record used the Universal Church for Edir Macedo's business interests through financial fraud, such as diverting donations to the church to offshore companies and money laundering. Despite the allegation, stemming from an investigation, there was never a trial, as the church has tax immunity, and the alleged money laundering crimes were committed before the legal definition of the practice.

== Companies ==
=== Television ===
- Record
  - Record Internacional
  - TV Miramar (Mozambique)
- Record News
- RFTV

=== Radio ===
- Rádio Record
- Rádio Guaíba
- Rádio Sociedade
- Rádio Contemporânea
- Rádio Capital
- Rádio Record Campos
- Rádio Record Europa

=== Newspaper ===
- Correio do Povo
- Hoje em Dia
- O Dia

=== Internet ===
- R7 (also known as R7.com and Portal R7)

=== Other Companies ===
- Banco Renner
- Record Entrentenimento
- Record Produções e Gravações
  - Line Records
  - New Music
