= Edir Macedo =

Brazilian evangelical pastor

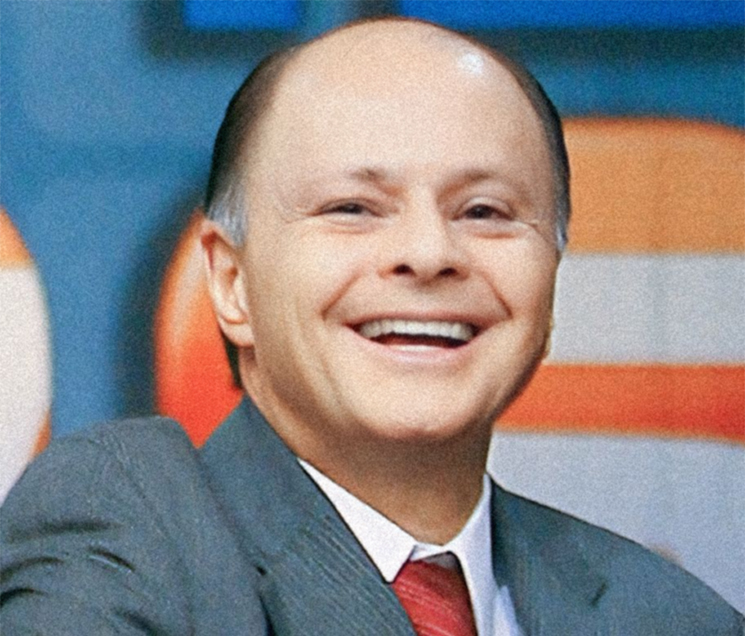
- Edir Macedo in 2007
- Born: February 18, 1945 (age 81); Rio das Flores, Rio de Janeiro, Brazil
- Occupations: Businessman, preacher, theologian, and author
- Website: https://www.universal.org/en/bispo-macedo/

Edir Macedo (born February 18, 1945) is a Brazilian evangelical bishop, writer, billionaire businessman, and the founder of the Universal Church of the Kingdom of God (UCKG). In 1989 he became the owner and chairman of the third-largest television network in Brazil, Record, and of Grupo Record, which he founded after he bought the network.

== Early life ==
Edir Macedo was born on February 18, 1945, in Rio de Janeiro, Brazil. He was the fourth child of Henrique Bezerra and Eugenia de Macedo Bezerra, known as Dona Geninha.

According to Macedo’s website, he holds degrees in theology from the Evangelical School of Theology “United Seminar” and the Faculty of Theological Education in the State of São Paulo (Fatebom). The website also states that he received a doctorate in theology and Christian philosophy, an honorary degree in divinity, and a master’s degree in theological science through the Federación Evangélica Española de Entidades Religiosas (F.E.E.D.E.R) in Madrid, Spain.

The reference to FEEDER may be an error. In the biography it appears with a question mark, and an organization with a similar name exists: the Federación de Entidades Religiosas Evangélicas de España (FEREDE). FEEDER appears to be referenced only in connection with Macedo. In 2021, FEREDE refused membership to the Comunidad Cristiana del Espíritu Santo, also known as Familia Unida or the Christian Help Centre, which is associated with the Universal Church of the Kingdom of God.

== Career ==
Macedo was raised Catholic, but by 1965 converted to Pentecostalism, after an invitation from his sister to Igreja Cristã de Nova Vida.

In 1975, Macedo founded a Pentecostal church with Romildo Ribeiro Soares, Cruzada do Caminho Eterno. After an argument, the two separated.

In 1977, Macedo founded with others the Universal Church of the Kingdom of God in Rio de Janeiro state, Brazil.

In 1989 he bought the free-to-air commercial television network Record and in the same year he founded Grupo Record. In 2007 he founded the 24-hour free-to-air news channel Record News.

Macedo’s rapidly expanding religious movement and his promotion of prosperity theology have been controversial. His sermons often focus on the idea that followers may be oppressed by unclean spirits, which he teaches can manifest in individuals and be expelled in the name of Jesus in order to overcome personal problems.

His views on other religions, particularly Catholicism, have also been a source of controversy. In 1992, Macedo spent eleven days in jail on accusations of charlatanism. According to his autobiography Nothing to Lose, several protests took place during this time, and supporters camped outside the police station where he was being held.

Macedo’s prosperity theology has also been cited by church leaders in discussions of his lifestyle. One reported statement attributed to him is: “If I preach prosperity and my clothes are ragged, who will follow me?”

From March 2013 to 2015, Macedo was on the Forbes billionaires list with a reported US$1.1 billion, and $1.24 b for Macedo and family, making him by far the richest pastor in Brazil and the world. He was not on the list for 2016 or later years.

The UCKG built a US$300 million replica in São Paulo of Solomon's Temple in Jerusalem, with an $8 million contract to import stones from Jerusalem like those used to build the 3,000-year-old original.

== Personal life ==
Macedo is married to Ester Bezerra, and has two daughters, Cristiane and Viviane, and an adopted son, Moises.

== Opinions and controversies ==
=== Opposition to interracial marriage ===
Macedo was criticized for writing an article opposing interracial marriage. He tried to justify his views claiming that multiracial children should be avoided because they will suffer discrimination. This led to several accusations of racism and misogyny.

=== Religious intolerance ===
Macedo has been criticised, especially after the 'kicking of the saint' incident in which UCKG bishop Sérgio Von Helder, who later left the Church, kicked a Catholic icon in a TV program, for which he was later imprisoned for two years. He also authored a book called Orixás, Caboclos and Guias in which he attacks Afro-Brazilian religion, accusing it of Satanism and "the root of all of Brazil's troubles". The book was first prohibited as hate speech, but after legal efforts from Macedo's church it was allowed for the sake of free speech.

=== Status of women ===
Edir Macedo stated in a 2019 sermon that daughters should not be allowed to seek out higher education, because if they do they will be "smarter than their husbands", and that he personally would not allow his daughters to go to college because he believes that an educated woman cannot have a happy marriage: "When they [my daughters] went out, I said they would just go to high school and they wouldn't go to college. My wife supported me, but the relatives found it absurd. Why don't you go to college? Because if you graduate from a particular profession, you will serve yourself, you will work for yourself. But I don’t want that, you came to serve God. Because if (…) she was a doctor and had a high degree of knowledge and found a boy who had a low degree of knowledge, he would not be the head, she would be the head. And if it were the head, it would not serve God's will. I want my daughters to marry a male. A man who has to be head. They have to be head. Because if they are not head their marriage is doomed to failure."

=== Federal Justice indictment ===
Edir Macedo was indicted by the Federal Justice for import of equipment and use of public documents and legal proceedings, but not convicted. Ten years later he was prosecuted again by the prosecutors of the State of São Paulo. On October 19, 2010 the São Paulo Justice Court (TJ-SP) annulled all accusations made by the São Paulo Public Ministry against the UCKG and its principal representatives by a majority vote. The judges deemed that the São Paulo prosecutors did not have jurisdiction to investigate the case, as the accusations were of a type that fell into the federal jurisdiction.

== Companies ==
Macedo also leads Record (the second biggest television network in Brazil), RFTV, Record News, Line Records, 64 radio stations of Rede Aleluia and Universal Produções.

== Books ==
Ten million copies of evangelical books by Macedo have been sold, and over 34 titles published. Titles include Orixás, Caboclos and Guias and In the Footsteps of Jesus, both of which sold more than three million copies in Brazil. He has also sold his trilogy called Nada a perder (Nothing to lose), with millions of copies sold worldwide. He has written several religious books including the polemical best-seller Orixás, Caboclos e Guias, Deuses ou Demônios.

== Movies ==
His broadcasting company Record financed the 2018 movie Nada a perder (Nothing to Lose) about Macedo's life, which is based on his autobiography. Reviews were negative, called it a glorification. Tickets were given out free of charge at the churches to make it a box office success, a practice already known from a previous movie by Record, The Ten Commandments: The Movie. A film version of Macedo's autobiography, named Nada a Perder (Nothing to Lose) like the book, was released in 2018, with massive attendances claimed and massive exaggeration reported. A sequel was released in August 2019.

== See also ==
- The Bishop – revealed history of Edir Macedo: biography (in Portuguese)
