= Ratinho =

Ratinho is the Portuguese word for "little rat". Ratinho may refer to:

== People ==
- Ratinho (footballer, born 1942), full name Heitor Martinho de Souza, Brazilian football winger
- Ratinho (TV presenter) (born 1956), full name Carlos Roberto Massa, Brazilian television host, politician, and businessman
- Ratinho (footballer, born 1971), full name Everson Rodrigues, Brazilian football midfielder
- Luciano Ratinho (born 1979), full name Luciano Ferreira Gabriel, Brazilian football midfielder
- Ratinho Júnior (born 1981), full name Carlos Roberto Massa Júnior, Brazilian politician
- Edson Ratinho (born 1986), full name Edson Ramos da Silva, Brazilian football right-back
- Eduardo Ratinho (born 1987), full name Eduardo Correia Piller Filho, Brazilian football right-back
- Ratinho (fighter) (born 1991), full name Rodrigo Lima, Brazilian mixed martial artist
- Ratinho (footballer, born 1996), full name Jurani Francisco Ferreira, Brazilian football midfielder

== See also ==
- Programa do Ratinho, Brazilian talk show program
