= TV Guará (Francisco Beltrão) =

TV Guará (ZYB 432)
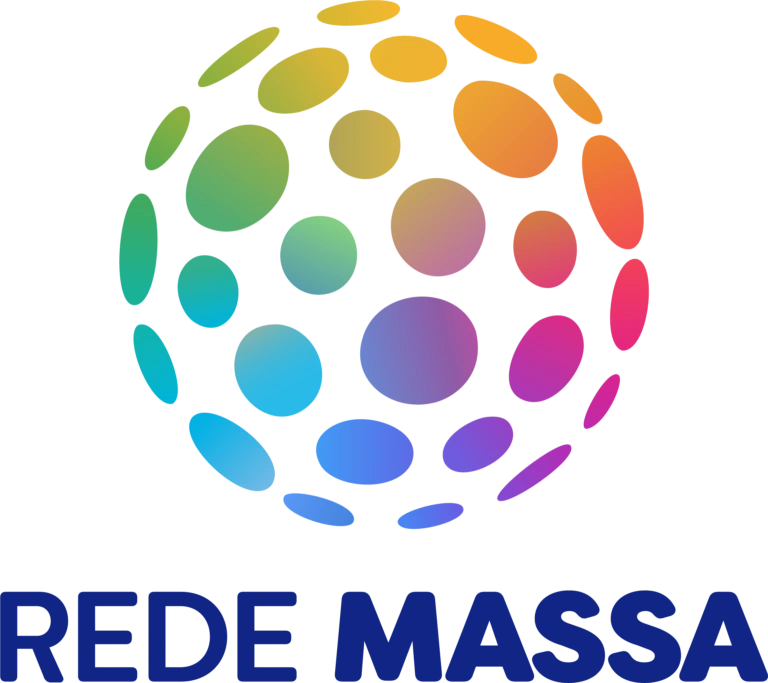
- Francisco Beltrão, Paraná; Brazil
- Channels: Digital: 30 (UHF); Virtual: 2
- Branding: Rede Massa

Programming
- Affiliations: SBT

Ownership
- Owner: Grupo Massa; (TV FB - Comunicações Ltda.)

History
- First air date: August 6, 2012
- Former channel numbers: Analog: 2 (VHF, 2012-2018)

Technical information
- Licensing authority: ANATEL
- ERP: 0.55 kW
- Transmitter coordinates: 26°4′54.6″S 53°2′15.3″W

Links
- Public license information: Profile
- Website: redemassa.com.br

TV Guará (channel 2) is a Brazilian television station licensed to Francisco Beltrão, Paraná, Brazil, affiliated with Sistema Brasileiro de Televisão. The station is part of Rede Massa, a network of five SBT affiliates owned by Carlos Massa. The station also operates an office in Ponta Grossa.

Its studios are located in the Araçá Grande Business Building, in the center of Francisco Beltrão, and its transmitters are at the top of Morro das Antenas, in the Vila Nova neighborhood. In Ponta Grossa, the station maintains studios in the Nova Russa neighborhood, and transmitters installed on top of the Vila Velha Building, in the city center.

== History ==
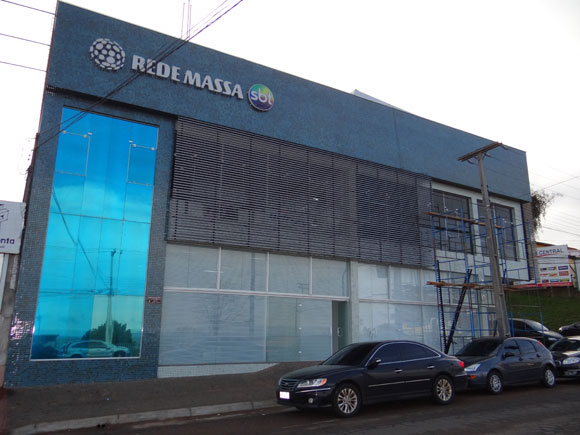
Station offices in the Nova Rússia neighborhood, em Ponta Grossa

After making an exchange with the channel installed in Paranaguá, Grupo Massa installed the equipment in the city of Ponta Grossa and its generator in Francisco Beltrão between 2011 and 2012. Since then, channel 2 (destined for the generator) had several launch dates postponed. This time, it was scheduled for August 6, 2012, at 7am with an SBT affiliation, which retransmits all state programs coming from Curitiba, but also broadcasts programs from Ponta Grossa.

On August 3, 2012, «journalist and station presenter Denian Couto spoke in the morning with the news teams, in which he highlighted that the content of the journalism will be aimed entirely at the community, showing the problems, needs and good things of the municipalities in the region. The station's general director, Jairo Cajal Junior, was in the studio showing the programming, in final preparations for the station's entry into the air.

On August 4, 2012, Grupo Massa welcomed the advertising market with feijoada for the broadcaster's commercial presentation and was attended by the president of Grupo Silvio Santos, Guilherme Stoliar, the National Sales Director of SBT, Henrique Casciato and the Director of Network and Affiliates of SBT, Roberto Franco. They were welcomed by the directors of Rede Massa, as well as Carlos Massa, aka Ratinho, the company's main shareholder.

TV Guará launched on August 6, 2012, precisely at 7am, when the first local program went on air, Jornal da Massa, with news from the region and at least six live entries (with presentations by Denian Couto and Fernanda Rocha), at 12pm Tribuna da Massa and at 7:20pm SBT Paraná, all in the Curitiba studios, with the exception of Tribuna da Massa, recorded at the TV Guará studios in Ponta Grossa.

On launch day, the station started covering 63 municipalities, serving a total of more than 1.6 million inhabitants, with its area being carved out from former relayers of TV Iguaçu, TV Cidade, TV Tibagi and TV Naipi, the existing stations of the network.

At the beginning of operations, TV Guará was seen on two channels in Francisco Beltrão: the generator on VHF channel 2 and a relay transmitter on UHF channel 14. The unusual feature of two channels in the same city was because Rede Massa requested an auxiliary repeater from the Ministry of Communications for better coverage of the city/region. A week after the inauguration, channel 4 in the station's concession city went off the air and was given to TVCi which, through an agreement, the Paranaguá channel was exchanged for the channel installed in Francisco Beltrão and Rede Massa could install another affiliate in the interior of the state.

Programming in the concession city only appeared about 10 months after the station opened. Since May 13, 2013, the morning edition of the newscast Tribuna de Massa was broadcast for the first time with a focus on the highlights of the southwest of the state, with the first presenter being Augusto Canário.
