= RPC (Brazilian television network) =

Brazilian regional television network

- Type: Broadcast television network
- Country: Brazil
- Availability: State of Paraná
- Founded: 29 October 1960 by Nagib Chede
- Launch date: 29 October 1960
- Former names: RPC TV (2010-2014)
- Affiliation: TV Globo
- Group: Grupo Paranaense de Comunicação (Sociedade Rádio Emissora Paranaense S/A)
- Official website: redeglobo.globo.com/rpc/

RPC is a Brazilian television network headquartered in Curitiba, capital of the state of Paraná. It was created in 2000 by Edmundo Lemanski and Francisco Cunha Pereira Filho, after the junction of the television stations of the old Rede Paranaense (TVs Paranaense, Coroados, Cataratas, Esplanada and Cultura), all affiliated with TV Globo. In 2009, the member stations of RPC stopped using their names which had been used since the junction of their stations in 2000, and made a decision to carry the name of their respective cities. It has eight stations around the state, being RPC Curitiba the flagship network.

== History ==
The history of RPC started on 29 October 1960, with the foundation of the first television station of the state, TV Paranaense, by the businessman Nagib Chede. In 1969, Chede sold the station to the businessmen Francisco Cunha Pereira Filho and Edmundo Lemanski, owners of the newspaper Gazeta do Povo. In 1972, the directors of TV Globo decided to transfer the affiliation contract that it had had with TV Paranaense since 1970 to TV Iguaçu, of the former governor of Paraná, Paulo Pimentel, of the then Aliança Renovadora Nacional (ARENA) in Paraná, and ally of the president of the military dictatorship, Emílio Médici. However, in 1976, Pimentel started having political disagreements with the minister of education Ney Braga, who was part of Ernesto Geisel's government. This enabled TV Globo to transfer again its affiliation contract to TV Paranaense.

Starting from there, the station reaffirmed the audience leadership maintained until the current day, in addition to significant improvements in its content, which originated from investments made by TV Globo. One of these was Jornal Estadual, which stayed on air until 1999, when it was replaced by Paraná TV. In the late 1970s, Grupo Paranaense de Comunicação acquired TV Coroados, from Londrina, of the hands of José Carlos Martinez and unified the programming of TV Cultura, from Maringá, founded in 1974, with that of TV Paranaense, forming thus, Rede Paranaense. From the early 80s until mid-2000s, Rede Paranaense expanded its signal for all around the state, as it opened or bought new stations. In 1989, TV Cataratas, from Foz do Iguaçu, was founded. In 1992, the group acquired TV Esplanada, from Ponta Grossa, until then, owned by businessman Pedro Wosgrau Filho, and affiliated with Rede Bandeirantes.

In 2000, Rede Paranaense abandoned its old name and was renamed RPC TV. The same case occurred with the stations of the network, that started to use of the name of Grupo RPC. Still in the same year, acquired from Sistema Sul de Comunicação, TV Guairacá, from Guarapuava, that was renamed RPC TV Guairacá. The same case occurred with TV Imagem do Noroeste, from Paranavaí, that was renamed RPC TV Imagem. In 2001, Grupo RPC inaugurated RPC TV Oeste, from Cascavel. Starting from there, it started covering all of the state of Paraná and consolidated itself as one the largest affiliates of TV Globo.

In 2009, the stations of RPC TV assumed the names of their respective cities, following a standardization made by the group. In the same year, RPC TV Curitiba launched its digital signal, being the pioneer in the south region of Brazil. In 2010, RPC TV started the expansion of its digital signal to the inland of the state, starting with RPC TV Londrina in February, and RPC TV Foz do Iguaçu, in November. In 2011, RPC TV Maringá launched its digital signal in March, while RPC TV Cascavel launched its signal in November. Also in November, entered on air in Paraná the SAT HD Regional, a joining of affiliates of TV Globo with a company of electronic products specialized in parabolic dishes. Initially, it was on air in the cities covered by RPC TV Curitiba, with prevision of expansion to the rural localities further away of the terrestrial signals. In November 2012, RPC TV Guarapuava launched its digital signal, and in December of the same year, RPC TV Ponta Grossa and RPC TV Paranavaí were the last stations of RPC TV to launch their digital signals.

On 1 January 2015, the network changed its logo and was renamed RPC.

Three of its inland stations (Cascavel, Londrina and Ponta Grossa) were added to SKY Brasil on July 22, 2020, while RPC Curitiba expanded its reach to further municipalities on the platform.

== Stations ==
Coverage area of the RPC stations: Curitiba in blue, Cascavel in red, Foz do Iguaçu in pink, Guarapuava in green, Londrina in purple, Maringá in yellow, Paranavaí in orange and Ponta Grossa in cyan

Callsign	Station	Channel	City	State
ZYB 391	RPC Curitiba	12 (41 UHF)	Curitiba	Paraná
ZYB 402	RPC Cascavel	10 (32 UHF)	Cascavel	Paraná
ZYB 408	RPC Foz do Iguaçu	5 (35 UHF)	Foz do Iguaçu	Paraná
ZYB 409	RPC Guarapuava	2 (32 UHF)	Guarapuava	Paraná
ZYB 392	RPC Londrina	3 (42 UHF)	Londrina	Paraná
ZYB 396	RPC Maringá	8 (41 UHF)	Maringá	Paraná
ZYB 411	RPC Paranavaí	29 (42 UHF)	Paranavaí	Paraná
ZYB 394	RPC Ponta Grossa	7 (42 UHF)	Ponta Grossa	Paraná
