= TV Naipi =

TV Naipi (ZYB 401)
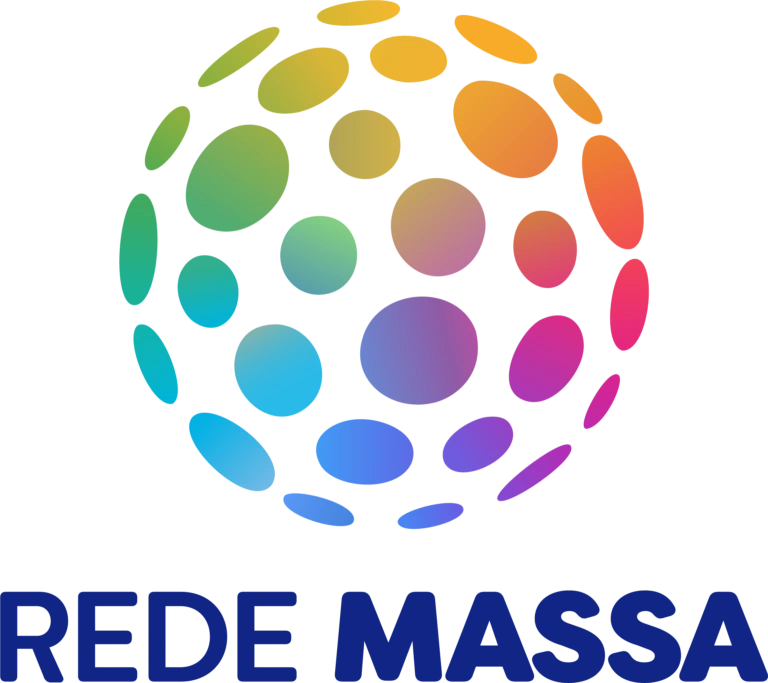
- Foz do Iguaçu, Paraná; Brazil
- Channels: Digital: 39 (UHF); Virtual: 12
- Branding: Rede Massa

Programming
- Affiliations: SBT

Ownership
- Owner: Rede Massa (Carlos Roberto Massa); (Televisão Naipi Ltda.)

History
- First air date: September 20, 1985
- Former channel numbers: Analog: 12 (VHF, 1985–2018)

Technical information
- Licensing authority: ANATEL
- ERP: 3.4 kW
- Transmitter coordinates: 25°31′47.2″S 54°34′17.3″W

Links
- Public license information: Profile
- Website: redemassa.com.br

TV Naipi (channel 12) is a Brazilian television station, headquartered in Foz do Iguaçu, a city in the state of Paraná, located on the Paraguayan border. The station is a part of Rede Massa, a complex of five SBT affiliates covering Paraná, itself part of Grupo Massa, owned by politician and television presenter Carlos Roberto Massa, alias Ratinho.

== History ==
The licence was granted to Paulo Pimentel, already owner of TV Iguaçu and TV Tibagi, in 1981. The station started regular broadcasts on September 20, 1985, under the control of Grupo Paulo Pimentel and the directorate of Vera Lúcia Pimentel, in an investment worth Cr$3,5 million. The station at launch covered 70 municipalities in Paraná, as well as adjacent border areas in Paraguay and Argentina.

The station's local programming beat RPC Foz do Iguaçu's ratings in the second half of 2014 alone. In September 2020, it achieved the same feat for the overall schedule, including networked programming, in the slots between 6am and 6pm. Its building was the target of a failed invasion on January 2, 2023, where a man stole a car from the Military Police, driving it to its facilities. None of its staff was injured.

== Technical information ==
=== Subchannels ===
| Channel | Video | Aspect | Short name | Programming |
|---|---|---|---|---|
| 12.1 | 1080i | 16:9 | Rede Massa | Main Rede Massa programming / SBT |

The station started digital broadcasts on May 23, 2014, on UHF channel 39, from December 15 the same year, it started high definition production.

Its analog signal was shut down on November 28, 2018.
