= RPC Maringá =

RPC Maringá (ZYB 396)
Maringá, Paraná; Brazil
- Channels: Digital: 41 (UHF); Virtual: 8
- Branding: RPC

Programming
- Affiliations: TV Globo

Ownership
- Owner: Grupo Paranaense de Comunicação; (Televisão Cultura de Maringá Ltda.)

History
- First air date: September 25, 1975
- Former names: TV Cultura de Maringá (1975-2000); RPC TV Cultura (2000-2010); RPC TV Maringá (2010-2014)
- Former channel numbers: Analog: 8 (VHF, 1975-2018)

Technical information
- Licensing authority: ANATEL

Links
- Public license information: Profile
- Website: redeglobo.globo.com/RPC

RPC Maringá is a Brazilian television station based in Maringá, PR. It operates on channel 8 (41 UHF digital) and is affiliated with TV Globo. It belongs to the Paranaense Communication Group (GRPCom), in addition to generating local programming.

== History ==
Dom Jaime Luiz Coelho founded the station in 1972, obtaining a license to operate on channel 8. Dom Jaime was its founding president. The building already had its facilities built in January 1975 in the facilities formerly occupied by Instituto Filadélfia de Maringá, who vacated the premises in the previous year. The station had a 60-meter transmitter installed, which at the time was one of the highest in Brazil. The station started operating in September 1975 and covers 69 municipalities in the regions of Maringá, Campo Mourão, Ivaiporã, Jandaia do Sul, Astorga and Colorado, region estimated to have 1,1 million viewers. It initially was a partial affiliate of Rede Bandeirantes and TV Gazeta, while having REI as its main affiliation. The new station also had an agreement with TV Paranaense where it relayed Jornal do Meio-Dia from Curitiba. Broadcasts started at 11:30am and ended at 11pm. Throughout the week, the station also aired a handful of American series, Daniel Boone, Cannon, Bonanza and Hawaii Five-O.

The station became a Globo affiliate on April 1, 1976, while simultaneously improving the quality of its transmitters and equipment. On July 25, 1978, José Roberto Marinho of the Globo network became its majority shareholder, definitively becoming a part of Rede Paranaense de Televisão and its first inland station. The change in ownership led to the local output being reduced to the noon news service. In the mid-1980s, it had the widest coverage among Paraná's TV stations.

The local edition of Paraná TV gained a new set on May 31, 2011.

== Technical information ==
=== Subchannels ===
| Channel | Video | Aspect | Short name | Programming |
|---|---|---|---|---|
| 8.1 | 1080i | 16:9 | RPC TV | Main RPC programming / TV Globo |

The station closed its analog signal on November 28, 2018.
