= Erika Hilton =

Brazilian politician (born 1992)

- Hilton in 2025

Member of the Chamber of Deputies
- Incumbent
- Assumed office 1 February 2023
- Constituency: São Paulo

Member of the Municipal Chamber of São Paulo
- In office 1 January 2021 – 1 February 2023
- Constituency: At-large

Personal details
- Born: 9 December 1992 (age 33) Franco da Rocha, São Paulo, Brazil
- Party: PSOL (2015–present)
- Education: Federal University of São Carlos
- Occupation: Politician; activist; pedagogue
- Website: erikahilton.com.br

Erika Santos Silva (born 9 December 1992), known as Erika Hilton (Brazilian Portuguese: [ˈɛɾikɐ ˈʁiwtõ]), is a Brazilian politician and activist for Black, LGBTQ+, and women's rights. She transitioned to female during her youth and has since become one of the most prominent transgender political figures in Latin America. Hilton studied pedagogy and gerontology at the Federal University of São Carlos before entering electoral politics.

Affiliated with the Socialism and Liberty Party (PSOL), she gained national and international recognition in the 2020 municipal elections after becoming the first openly transgender woman elected to the Municipal Chamber of São Paulo. She received the highest number of votes of any female councilor candidate in the country during that cycle.

In November 2021, she was honored with the "Generation Change Award" at the 2021 MTV Europe Music Awards in Budapest for her human rights advocacy.

In the 2022 general elections, Hilton and Duda Salabert made history as the first two openly transgender individuals elected to the National Congress of Brazil, both securing seats in the lower house, the Chamber of Deputies. Following her historic win, she was recognized by the BBC as one of its 100 Women of the year in December 2022.

== Early life and education ==
Hilton was born in Franco da Rocha and grew up on the outskirts of Francisco Morato, both located in Greater São Paulo. When she was 14, she and her family moved to Itu in the interior of São Paulo state. Raised in an evangelical family, Hilton experienced gender-based violence by her uncles because of her gender identity, and ultimately became homeless at the age of 15, during which time she used sex work to survive. After six years, Hilton returned to the care of her mother.

Hilton subsequently completed her education and started studying pedagogy and gerontology at the Federal University of São Carlos, although she did not graduate. While at university, Hilton took part in student politics.

== Activism and political beginnings ==
In 2015, Hilton launched an online petition calling for transgender people to be given the right to choose their own names after a bus company in Itu refused to print her female name on a seasonal bus ticket. The petition went viral online, and was ultimately successful.

Following her petition, Hilton gained national notice as a transgender rights activist. She was invited to join PSOL, and ran an ultimately unsuccessful campaign to become a councillor in Itu in 2016.

=== Bancada Ativista (2018–2020) ===
Hilton in 2019

In 2018, Hilton joined Bancada Ativista, a political movement calling for a diversification of Brazilian politics. She was part of a collective mandate which saw Mônica Seixas elected to the Legislative Assembly of São Paulo with 149,844 votes. Hilton officially acted as an aide to Seixas, but alongside the other members of Bancada Ativista, acted "almost as a parliamentarian"; the Legislative Assembly permitted Seixas' official portrait to show all members of the collective, although only Seixas was officially recognised as a member of the assembly.

== Municipal Chamber of São Paulo (2021–2023) ==
In 2020, Hilton left Bancada Ativista in order to stand as a candidate for the Municipal Chamber of São Paulo; she was elected with 50,508 votes, the most received by a female councillor, and became the first trans woman to occupy a seat in the chamber. During the same election, Thammy Miranda became the first trans man to be elected to the chamber. Hilton started her mandate in the chamber on 1 January 2021 and ran as the PSOL candidate to serve as president of the chamber, though was defeated by Milton Leite of the Democrats. She was chosen as the leader of the PSOL councillors, which constituted the third largest party in the chamber.

During her time as a councillor, Hilton sat on the chamber's commissions on human rights and citizenship, public administration, and education and culture. Hilton's bills included a proposal to establish a municipal fund to fight hunger, with the objective of financing public policies to ensure food security in São Paulo.

=== Parliamentary Inquiry Commission on Transphobia ===
At the initiative of Erika Hilton, on 24 September 2021, a Parliamentary Commission of Inquiry (CPI) was established in the Municipal Chamber of São Paulo to investigate violence against transgender and travesti people in the city. Erika Hilton was elected president of the Commission and, together with the other members, became responsible for investigating transphobic violence committed against transgender women and men, travesti, and non-binary people in the city.

The data set relating to the investigation and conclusions of the Parliamentary Commission of Inquiry (CPI) were made available in the CPI's final report, which forwarded 189 recommendations to 33 public and private institutions regarding initiatives to combat institutional transphobia.

=== Distribution of sanitary pads to transmasculine students ===
On 30 July 2021, the Municipal Chamber of São Paulo approved a bill mandating the distribution of sanitary pads to female students in the city's schools. Hilton, together with Councilman Thammy Miranda, proposed an amendment to the bill to replace the words "female students" (alunas) with "students" (estudantes) in order to include transmasculine individuals in the initiative. The amendment was rejected by the Council, and the bill was signed into law by Mayor Ricardo Nunes (MDB) on July 12. In May 2022, the Socialism and Liberty Party (PSOL), at Hilton's request, filed a lawsuit with the São Paulo Court of Justice seeking to include trans people in the law. On May 11, the Court ruled that transmasculine students must be included in the law.

== Chamber of Deputies (2023–present) ==
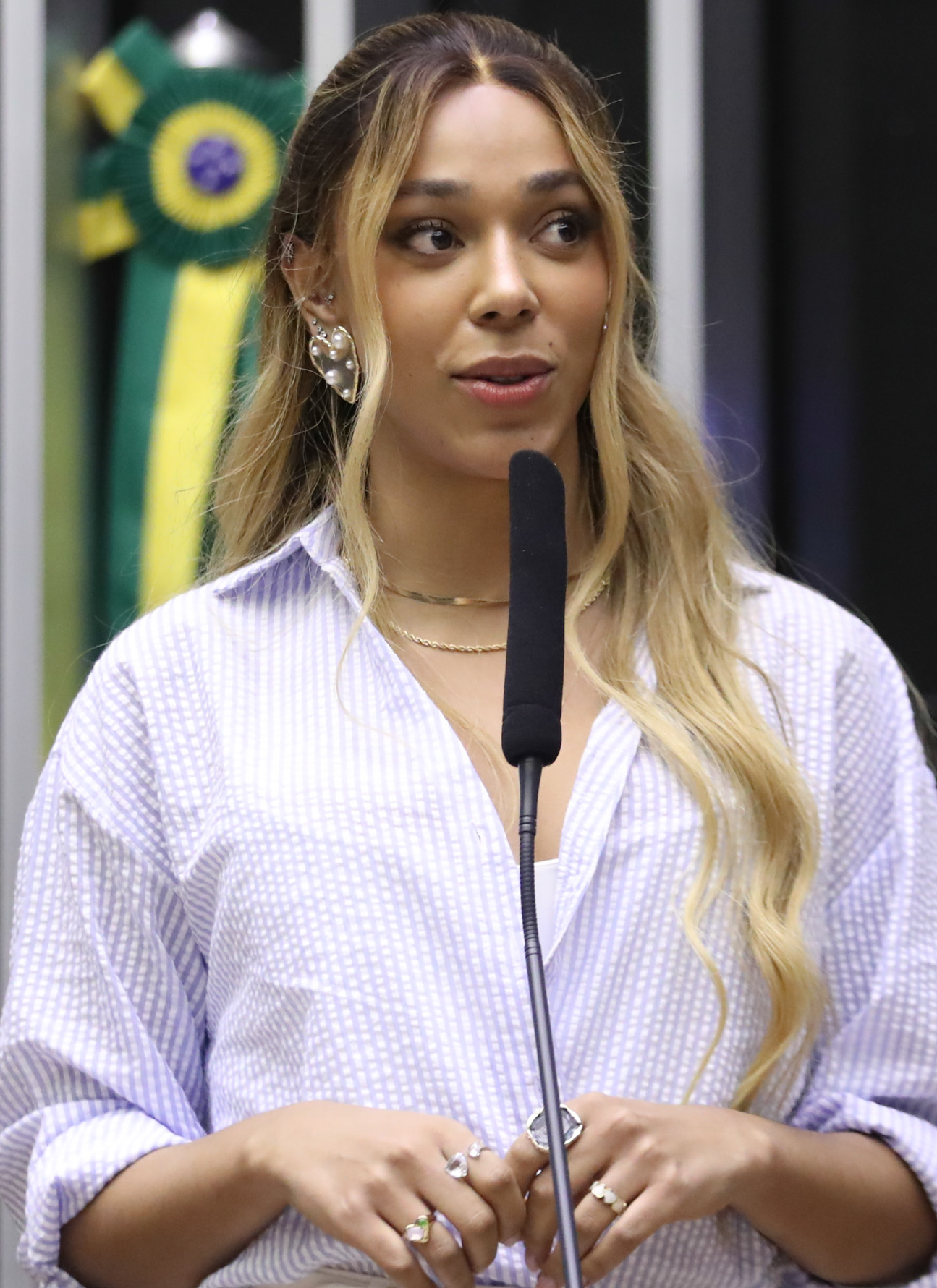
Hilton in 2024

In March 2022, Hilton announced that she would stand as a PSOL candidate for São Paulo in the Chamber of Deputies. She was ultimately successful, garnering 256,903 votes. Hilton's mandate included the inclusion of trans people in the Brazilian workforce.

In May 2023, Hilton was unanimously elected as vice president of the chamber's human rights, minorities and racial equality commission.

In July 2023, during a parliamentary enquiry into the 2023 Brazilian Congress attack, deputy Abilio Brunini commented during a speech given by Hilton that she was "offering sexual services" in the chamber. Following his comments, it was announced that Brunini would be investigated by the attorney general for "political and gender violence".

In response to the proposal of bill 5167/2009, which would prohibit civil unions between same-sex couples, Hilton established the Parliamentary Front in Defence of Citizenship and the Rights of the LGBTI+ Community in September 2023, with the support of 210 deputies and senators, with the goal of promoting and protecting the rights of LGBT+ people.

In May 2026, Hilton publicly questioned Meta Platforms after several LGBTQ Instagram profiles in Brazil were suspended and later restored without individualized public explanations. The affected accounts included the queer news outlets GAYBLOGBR, Ezatamentchy, ComunidadesLGBTQIA, Pheeno and UniversoLGBTI. Hilton and São Paulo city councillor Amanda Paschoal sent an official request to Meta Platforms Brasil requesting the restoration of the accounts, clarification of the rules allegedly violated, preservation of data and qualified human review of the suspensions. The case was also cited by Sleeping Giants Brasil in an extrajudicial notice concerning content moderation and LGBTQIA+ rights in Brazil, which referred to a civil inquiry by Brazil's Federal Public Prosecutor's Office (Ministério Público Federal - MPF) into possible harms to LGBTQ people following changes to Meta's content policies.

Hilton was re-elected in 2026 with 1.5 million votes, making her the most voted congresswoman in Brazil's history.

=== Women's Rights Defense Commission ===
Installation Meeting and Election of the President and Vice-Presidents of the Commission.

On 11 March 2026, Hilton was elected to chair the Women's Rights Defense Commission of the Chamber of Deputies for one year, despite opposition from the Liberal Party, with 11 votes in favor and 10 blank votes, succeeding congresswoman Célia Xakriabá (PSOL-MG). Hilton is the first transgender woman to hold the presidency of the Commission. She stated:

This presidency is not just a name; it is the symbol of an expanding democracy. My administration will address all women: single mothers, working women, Black women, Indigenous women, and those who fight for survival and dignity in every corner of this country.

On March 12, presenter Ratinho criticized Erika's election on his program, stating:

There are so many women, why choose a trans woman? She's not a woman, she's trans. I have nothing against trans people, but there are other women, real women... But a woman, to be a woman, has to have a uterus, has to menstruate, has to be annoying for three or four days. Let's modernize, have inclusion, but there's no need to exaggerate. They're exaggerating.

Hilton filed a complaint with the Federal Public Prosecutor's Office (MPF), requesting an investigation for the crime of transphobia and asking for the opening of a public civil action with compensation of 10 million reais for collective pain and suffering caused to the trans and travesti population, to be reverted to the Fund for the Defense of Diffuse Rights (that is, nothing to be received directly by her), and that she be granted the right of reply during prime time, with a duration equivalent to that of his speech.

Ratinho sued Hilton for slander, libel, and defamation. According to Ratinho's defense, Hilton allegedly offended his honor by saying he was "just a rat" in a post responding to his statement on his program. Hilton's defense sent an extrajudicial notification to SBT requesting the right of reply, which was ignored by the network.

The São Paulo Court of Justice, in a decision published on June 17, ordered SBT to broadcast a right-of-reply video from Hilton on the Programa do Ratinho, at the same time and with the same prominence as his statements, within 10 days, under penalty of a daily fine of 50,000 reais in case of non-compliance. In the ruling, Judge André Della Latta Cartaxo stated that, although it is legitimate to question the actions of public officials, Ratinho had exceeded the limits of freedom of expression. According to Cartaxo:

The presenter's discourse did not remain within the contours of criticism of the appointment and advanced into the realm of repeated denial of the author's own identity. By repeatedly denying the author's status as a woman [...] he is not merely expressing a personal opinion. In truth, he is delegitimizing the very personality of the human being. What is being repressed, however, is not the disagreement, but the way it was expressed on national television. Offense is not opinion, it is an illegal act.

== Personal life ==
Regarding her sexual orientation, Erika stated that she tried to have relationships with women, but it did not work out. Since 2023, she has been in a relationship with photographer Daniel Zezza, who is a trans man; they both live in a trans-centered relationship. She previously was in a relationship with Gabriel Lodi, also a trans man.

Hilton is of Beninese, Angolan, Nigerian, Cameroonian, Ugandan, North African, indigenous, and Portuguese immigrant descent.

== Lawsuits ==
In January 2021, Hilton sued 50 people who allegedly made transphobic, racist, and sexist threats against her on social media. On January 26, Hilton was harassed by a man inside the Municipal Chamber of São Paulo. The man was carrying a flag and wearing masks with religious symbols and entered her office, insistently asking to speak with her. He introduced himself as a "reactionary waiter" and said he was one of the people being sued by her. The police are investigating whether the case is related to two other attacks against transgender city councilwomen from the PSOL party in São Paulo.

In October 2021, Hilton sued volleyball player Maurício Souza for discrimination against LGBTQ people.

She filed a complaint with the UN High Commissioner for Human Rights requesting that the body monitor the case of the murder of Genivaldo de Jesus by federal highway police officers.

In August 2022, Hilton filed a criminal complaint with the Supreme Federal Court against then-President Jair Bolsonaro for homophobia and transphobia. The action requests the opening of a criminal investigation against the president for statements made during an event with evangelicals in Maranhão and has Justice Dias Toffoli as the rapporteur.
