= Discrimination against LGBTQ people in Brazil =

Discrimination against LGBTQ people in Brazil still occurs despite all the country's advances in the legal protection of LGBTQ people. Brazil is one of the few countries in the world where homophobia and transphobia are considered crimes not subject to a statute of limitations or bail, equated to racism, and punishable by fines or imprisonment since 2019. However, statistics from independent groups, such as Grupo Gay da Bahia (GGB), suggests that the country had the highest number of reported cases of homophobia and transphobia in multiple years, alongside Mexico and the United States. Nevertheless, these figures are subject to constant methodological criticism, partly because very few countries worldwide record crimes motivated by homophobia or transphobia.

According to GGB, a homosexual person dies every 28 hours in the country due to homophobia (murders and suicides), and about 70% of murders of LGBT people go unpunished. According to a study conducted by the University of São Paulo in 2014, seven out of ten Brazilian homosexuals have suffered some type of aggression, whether physical or verbal. The country had 650 homophobic or transphobic murders in 2012 and 2013 and accounts for half of the total number of homicides of transgender people in the world, according to reports from international agencies such as Transgender Europe and Trans Respect Versus Transphobia Worldwide.

A 2007 survey by the Pew Research Center showed that 65% of the Brazilian population believes that homosexuality should be accepted by society. According to Datafolha, in 2022, this figure rose to nearly 80%, with a brief drop to 72% in 2026. Nevertheless, for lawyer Margarida Pressburger, a member of the Subcommittee on Prevention of Torture of the United Nations (UN), Brazil "is still a racist and homophobic country." Amnesty International stated in a report released in 2015 that political and religious pressure in the country tends to block the advancement of laws that could protect minorities from discrimination, especially homosexual people.

== Background ==
=== Colonial period ===
In colonial Brazil, sodomy was criminalized. Title XIII of Book V of the Philippine Ordinances stated:

Any person, of whatever rank, who commits the sin of sodomy in any way, shall be burned, and reduced to fire and ashes, so that no memory of their body or grave may ever remain, and all their possessions shall be confiscated for the crown of the kingdom, even if they have descendants: by the same fate their children and grandchildren shall be incapacitated and infamous, as well as those of those who committed the crime of lese-majesty. (Note: In Brazilian Portuguese: Toda pessoa, de qualquer qualidade que seja, que pecado de sodomia por qualquer maneira cometer, seja queimado, e feito por fogo e pó, para que nunca de seu corpo e sepultura possa haver memoria, e todos os seus bens sejam confiscados para a coroa do reino, posto que tenha descendentes: pelo mesmo caso seus filhos e netos ficarão inábeis e infames, assim como os daqueles que cometeram crime de lesa majestade.)

It is believed that Tibira do Maranhão was the first person executed for sodomy in Brazil. The case occurred in 1612 with the arrival of a French ship in Maranhão led by the Capuchin friar Yves d'Évreux. The Tupinambá people formed the largest indigenous nation in Brazil, among them the "Tibiras," a term from the Tupi language to describe homosexual indigenous people who performed tasks assigned to women and played a passive sexual role. Under the justification of "purifying the land of its evils," the French ordered the search and capture of Tibira indigenous people, and one of them, who had escaped, was tried, baptized, and sentenced to death. In 2016, a plaque, bearing the inscription: "1st case of Homophobia in Brazil," was inaugurated by the government of Maranhão in honor of Tibira, in Praça Marcílio Dias, in the center of São Luís.

=== Contemporary period ===
Children and adolescents in schools can suffer from discrimination and prejudice from both students and teachers and school principals. A study conducted in 501 schools in 2009 found that 80% of students would like to maintain some kind of distance from people with disabilities, homosexuals, the poor, and Black people. 17.4% reported knowing of students who were victims of bullying because of their homosexuality.

In 2010, a publication in a pharmacy student newspaper at the University of São Paulo (USP) incited students to throw human excrement at gays and offered free tickets to a party in return. Psychologist Rozângela Alves Justino, who practices in Rio de Janeiro, was also considered homophobic by LGBTQ movements and punished by the Federal Council of Psychology for trying to "cure" homosexual people who sought her services.

In the same year, then-federal deputy Jair Bolsonaro became embroiled in controversy when he declared he was in favor of beating homosexual children and teenagers, positioning himself as a defender of the "traditional family." According to the deputy: "If a son starts to become a little gayish, he gets a beating, and his behavior changes. Look, I see a lot of people out there saying: thank goodness I got a few spankings, my father taught me to be a man." Bolsonaro's statement had a negative impact among human rights advocates and LGBTQ rights associations. Associação Brasileira de Lésbicas, Gays, Bissexuais, Travestis, Transexuais e Intersexos (ABLGT) advocated that Bolsonaro be prosecuted for his stance. The Brazilian Chamber of Deputies sought to punish the deputy, arguing that he could not participate in the human rights commission because he defended violence against children and homosexuals. In a meeting of the Chamber's Human Rights Commission, Bolsonaro maintained all his statements; on that occasion, he was also defended by deputy Fernando Chiarelli (PDT-SP).

Also in 2010, young homosexuals were violently attacked on Avenida Paulista in São Paulo. In November of the same year, Douglas Igor Marques was shot, for no apparent reason, by a sergeant in the Brazilian Army after leaving the LGBTQ Pride Parade in Rio de Janeiro.

In May 2011, with the recognition of civil unions for same-sex couples by the Supreme Federal Court, Jair Bolsonaro was also criticized for statements considered homophobic. According to the Terra portal, Bolsonaro stated that "the next step will be the adoption of children [by gay couples] and the legalization of pedophilia," associating homosexuality with pedophilia. Bolsonaro's statements were mocked by internet users on X, who celebrated the Supreme Court decision. In July 2011, when asked about Brazilian Congressional Bill No. 122 in an interview with Época magazine, Bolsonaro said that "most homosexuals are murdered by their respective pimps, in areas of prostitution and drug use."

In 11 January 2014, the body of 17-year-old Kaique Augusto dos Santos was found under the Nove de Julho Viaduct in downtown São Paulo. Police registered the case as a suicide, but relatives of the victim claim that Kaique was attacked by one or more homophobic individuals, as he was openly gay and had just left a gay party.

In May 2014, the Regional Council of Psychology of Paraná revoked Marisa Lobo's professional registration for charlatanism. Marisa Lobo was accused of basing her professional practices on religious dogmas, offering conversion therapies. The controversy began in 2012 when Marisa Lobo participated in a public hearing in the Chamber of Deputies to debate Legislative Decree Project No. 234/11, authored by Deputy João Campos de Araújo (PSDB-GO), which proposed modifying the resolution of the Federal Council of Psychology (CFP 01/99), which prohibits psychology professionals from any action that favors the pathologization of homoerotic behaviors or practices.

== Statistics ==
According to data from the Coordination of Sexual Diversity Affairs of the São Paulo City Hall in 2008, cases of homophobia increased after the city's pride parade.

In April 2009, Grupo Gay da Bahia (GGB) released its survey on cases verified in 2008, indicating that 190 people were murdered in Brazil that year, 64% of whom were gay men, 32% travestis, and 4% lesbians, a 55% increase over the 2007 figures, maintaining the country as the one that registers the most crimes of an LGBTphobic motivation. The survey also concludes that the risk of a travesti being murdered is 259 times greater than that of a gay man. Since it began its research in 1980, the group has recorded 2,998 murders. The research carried out by the GGB also indicated that most of the victims were between 20 and 40 years old and that 80% of homosexuals were killed inside their homes. Also according to the research, the Northeast is the Brazilian region with the highest number of registered LGBTphobic crimes, with the states of Bahia, Pernambuco, Rio Grande do Norte and Alagoas registering the most LGBTphobic crimes in Brazil in 2007.

However, GGB's data has been contested in multiple occasions on the grounds that it include all murders of LGBTQ people reported in the media – that is, not only those motivated by prejudice against homosexuals. Reinaldo de Azevedo, columnist of the Veja magazine, Brazil's most-read weekly publication, called the GGB's methodology "unscientific" based on the above objection.

Another criticism leveled at the numbers released by organizations such as ANTRA (National Association of Travestis and Transsexuals) and GGB is that, even assuming the data collection is credible, there is no basis for international comparison. Very few countries collect data on homophobic and transphobic violence, and the criminalization of homosexuality in many of them appears to preclude fair comparisons. According to a range of analyses in the field of Social Sciences, direct global comparisons regarding the murders of trans people, for instance, are flawed because the figures actually reflect each country's documentation capacity and the work of local organizations, rather than the total number of crimes committed. Consequently, the methodology behind this type of analysis is frequently criticized for having structural limitations and for penalizing supportive countries that collect data to formulate public policies for this demographic.

== Religion and LGBTQ people ==
There is no consensus among Brazilian Christian denominations regarding LGBTQ people, with some supporting LGBTQ rights and others not. Some parachurch movements, generally without denominational affiliation, have also campaigned against LGBTQ rights, including in favor of conversion therapies. Some examples of these groups are Exodus International, Grupo de Amigos (G.A.), the Ministério Deus se Importa, and Movimento Pela Sexualidade Sadia (MOSES).

However, Sérgio Viula, one of the founders of MOSES and a former Baptist pastor, gave an interview to Época magazine stating that the movements in favor of conversion therapy are false and that such treatments do not work. Since coming out as gay, Viula has divorced his wife, left the ministry and the church, and become an atheist. He maintains a blog where he supports gay rights, as well as posting content with his partner Emanuel Silva.

A study published in 2010 by the University of Brasília indicated that religious education in Brazil promotes religious intolerance and prejudice, including LGBTphobia. According to Débora Diniz, who led the research, "the book(s) use(s) generalizations to spread misinformation and preach Christianity."

Regarding the topic, former federal deputy Jean Wyllys, in a letter published on the blog Brasília, eu vi, states:

[...] the limit of freedom of expression for anyone is the human dignity of another person. What religious fanatics and fundamentalists have been doing most in recent years is violating the human dignity of homosexuals.

== Response ==
In 2008, Marta Suplicy, former Minister of Tourism, argued that Brazil could be known as a country "with zero homophobia and no one afraid of being homosexual."

In February 2011, the Brazilian government launched the telephone number "Disque 100" to report homophobic acts.

=== Laws ===
==== Brazilian Congressional Bil No. 122 ====
There is no specific law in the country criminalizing discrimination based on sexual orientation and gender identity, despite the existence of the Congressional Bill No. 122, which was shelved in 2015. This bill was created in 2006 and approved by the Chamber of Deputies in 2008. In December 2010, it was pending in the Brazilian Senate. The bill had the support of President Dilma Rousseff. The bill proposed criminalizing prejudices motivated by sexual orientation and gender identity, equating them to other prejudices already covered by Law 7716/89. This project was initiated in the Chamber of Deputies, authored by Representative Iara Bernardi, and was processed there under number 5003/2001. The approved version proposed, in addition to criminal penalties, further civil punishments for homophobic and transphobic prejudice, such as the loss of office for public servants, disqualification from contracts with the public administration, prohibition of access to credit from official banks, and the denial of tax benefits.

==== Public opinion ====
According to a telephone survey conducted by DataSenado in 2008 with 1,120 people from all five regions of Brazil, 70% of respondents were in favor of criminalizing homophobia in the country. Approval was widespread across almost all segments, by region, gender, and age. The survey showed 54% approval among Evangelicals, 70% among Catholics and adherents of other religions, and 79% among atheists. Among those aged 16-29, 76% supported the bill. The survey also indicated that people with higher levels of education tended to be more favorable to the bill – 78% of those with higher education and 55% of those with only a fourth-grade education.

Experts interviewed by Folha de S.Paulo, including Supreme Federal Court (STF) Justice Marco Aurélio Mello, unanimously stated that the bill does not violate the principle of freedom of expression and is constitutional. In 2011, STF Justice Ayres Britto, in an interview with Folha, stated that he is in favor of criminalizing homophobia, as already occurs with other hate speech. Others legal experts advocate for the immediate approval of laws that criminalize homophobia.

However, some Catholic and Protestant Christian groups claim that the bill infringes on religious freedom and freedom of expression.

=== Supreme Court decision ===
On 13 June 2019, the Supreme Federal Court ruled on a Direct Action of Unconstitutionality by Omission (ADO 26), sent to the Court in 2013 by the Popular Socialist Party, and the Writ of Mandamus (MI 4733), which was filed in 2012 by Associação Brasileira de Gays, Lésbicas, Bissexuais, Travestis, Transexuais e Intersexos (ABGLT).

According to the lawsuits, Article 5 of the 1988 Federal Constitution stipulates that any "discrimination that violates fundamental rights and freedoms" should be punished criminally. The justification used by those responsible for filing the lawsuits is that, by not legislating on homophobia and transphobia, deputies and senators are unconstitutionally failing to act due to "pure and simple institutional ill will." The Supreme Federal Court ruled that the crime of racism should be applied to cases of aggression against LGBT people (lesbians, gays, bisexuals, transsexuals, and travestis) until a specific law is approved by the National Congress.

== Public opinion ==
According to a 2018 Datafolha survey, a large majority of Brazilians responded that "homosexuality should be accepted" by society (74%), compared to 18% who responded that it should be "discouraged" and 8% who said they "didn't know." This was the highest level of acceptance in the survey's history: in 2013, the numbers were 67% for acceptance, 25% for discouragement, and 7% who did not know.

The level of acceptance of homosexuality among Brazilians varies regionally. Those in the South region (80%) are the most accepting of homosexuality, followed by the Southeast (74%), Northeast (73%), Central-West (72%), and North (65%). Acceptance is also higher among younger people (84% among those aged 16 to 24); those with higher education (82% of those with a university degree); and the wealthiest (82% of those earning more than ten minimum wages). Acceptance is below average among older Brazilians (64% aged 60 or older); those with less education (67% with primary education), the poorest (72% earning up to two minimum wages), and Evangelicals (57%). Among Catholics, acceptance is at 80%.

Another Datafolha survey, released on 3 July 2026, showed that acceptance of homosexuality fell to 72%, while rejection increased to 20%, and 8% did not know. Evangelicals showed 61% support and 29% discouragement, while Catholics showed 75% support and 18% discouragement. Women showed 76% support and 16% discouragement, while men showed 69% support and 24% discouragement. 81% of Lula's voters expressed support for homosexuality and 14% discouragement, while Flávio Bolsonaro's voters showed support from 65% and discouragement from 26%.
