= Ratinho Júnior =

Brazilian politician (born 1981)

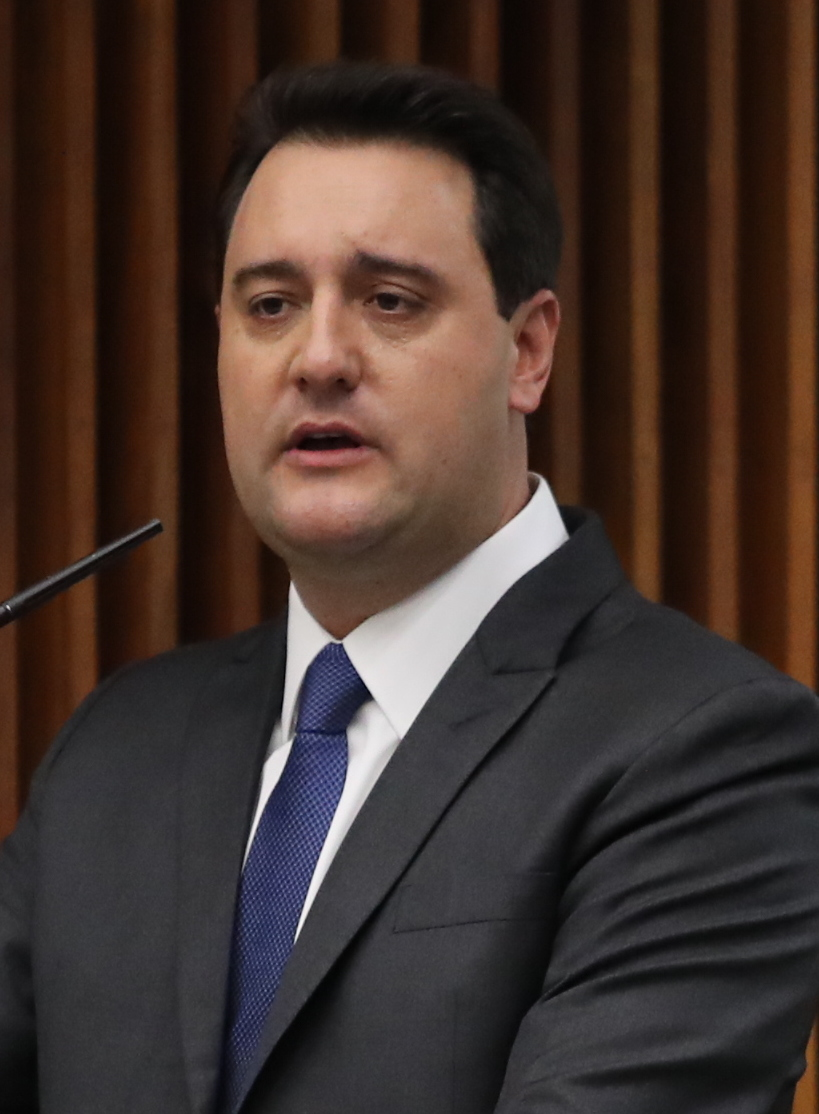
- Ratinho Júnior in 2023

58th Governor of Paraná
- Incumbent
- Assumed office 1 January 2019
- Lieutenant: Darci Piana
- Preceded by: Cida Borghetti

State Deputy of Paraná
- In office 11 September 2017 – 1 January 2019
- Constituency: At-large
- In office 1 February 2003 – 1 February 2007
- Constituency: At-large

Secretary of Urban Development of Paraná
- In office 1 January 2015 – 11 September 2017
- Governor: Beto Richa
- Preceded by: João Carlos Ortega
- Succeeded by: João Carlos Ortega
- In office 7 February 2013 – 4 April 2014
- Governor: Beto Richa
- Preceded by: Cezar Silvestri
- Succeeded by: João Carlos Ortega

Member of the Chamber of Deputies
- In office 1 February 2007 – 1 January 2015
- Constituency: Paraná

Personal details
- Born: Carlos Roberto Massa Júnior; 19 April 1981 (age 45) Jandaia do Sul, Paraná, Brazil
- Party: Socialist (2001–2003); Cidadania (2003–2007); Social Christian (2007–2016); Social Democratic Party (2016–present)
- Spouse: Luciana Saito Azevedo (m. 2003)
- Children: 3
- Parent: Ratinho (father)
- Education: Faculdade Internacional de Curitiba; Catholic University of Brasília; Complutense University of Madrid

Carlos Roberto Massa Júnior (born 19 April 1981), best known as Ratinho Júnior, is a Brazilian politician and the son of television host and former politician Ratinho. Ratinho Júnior is the current governor of the state of Paraná, having won the 2018 and 2022 elections.

== Biography ==
Son of Carlos Roberto Massa and Solange Martinez Massa, Carlos Roberto Massa Júnior was born on 19 April 1981 in Jandaia do Sul, in Paraná, but moved to the city of Curitiba when he was three years old.

Ratinho Júnior completed all of his basic education in the state of Paraná, at Colégio Tuiuti (1988-1992) in Curitiba, Colégio Unidade São José dos Pinhais (1993-1995) and Colégio Ideal (1996-1998), both in São José dos Pinhais.

In 2004, he graduated in Marketing and Advertising from the International College of Curitiba (FACINTER) and, even before completing his degree, worked at several radio and TV stations in Paraná, including presenting the program Microfone Aberto on Rádio Massa FM, which belongs to his father's business conglomerate.

In 2011, he completed a postgraduate degree in State Law from the Catholic University of Brasília, in the Federal District, in addition to taking specialization courses in Tax Administration and Fiscal Reform and Society from the Complutense University of Madrid. Furthermore, he managed five of his family's companies, including two radio stations, Estação FM, in Curitiba, and Eldorado AM 1120, in São José dos Pinhais, serving as director of the Massa Group.

Since 2003, Carlos Roberto Massa Júnior has been married to businesswoman Luciana Saito Azevedo and has three children: Alana Saito Massa, Yasmim Saito Massa and Carlos Roberto Massa Neto.
