= RPC Ponta Grossa =

RPC Ponta Grossa (ZYB 394)
- Ponta Grossa, Paraná; Brazil
- Channels: Digital: 42 (UHF); Virtual: 7
- Branding: RPC

Programming
- Affiliations: TV Globo

Ownership
- Owner: Grupo Paraense de Comunicação; (TV Esplanada do Paraná Ltda.)

History
- First air date: April 17, 1972
- Former names: TV Esplanada (1972-2000); RPC TV Esplanada (2000-2010); RPC TV Ponta Grossa (2010-2014)
- Former channel numbers: Analog: 7 (VHF, 1972-2018)
- Former affiliations: Rede Tupi (1972-1980); Rede Bandeirantes (1980-1992)

Technical information
- Licensing authority: ANATEL
- ERP: 5 kW

Links
- Public license information: Profile
- Website: redeglobo.globo.com/RPC

RPC Ponta Grossa (channel 12) is a Brazilian television station licensed to Ponta Grossa, Paraná, Brazil, affiliated with TV Globo. The station is part of RPC and its signal covers the regions of Campos Gerais southern Paraná. Its studios are located at the Boa Vista neighborhood, and its transmitters are in the city center.

== History ==
The initial steps for the implementation of the first television station in Ponta Grossa were made in October 1966, when businessmen Constâncio Mendes, main controller of Jornal da Manhã and Wallace Pina, owner and founder of Rádio Difusora, received a license to operate on VHF channel 7.

Initially, it was supposed to begin operations on October 15 that year, however, due to financial problems, the station started to materialize on December 24, 1971, when its first experimental broadcast was made, being, for this reason, the longest time to install a television channel in Paraná, over a lapse of five years.

TV Esplanada, the third television station in inland Paraná, was formally inaugurated on April 17, 1972, at 4pm, in a solemnity that gathered several authorities of the minucupality, such as mayor Cyro Martins, who symbolically cut the inaugural strip, and bishop Dom Geraldo Pellanda, who baptized the facilities. The only line was from the then-artistic director, Arthur Fernandes Pina Ribeiro.

In its early years the legal name was TV Educadora de Ponta Grossa Ltda, later changed to the current denomination. Initially, it was intended to be an affiliate of Rede Record (REI), but such definition was affected by having negotiations with TV Paranaense, due to affiliation switches with its competitor, TV Iguaçu. Despite the precarious quality of its signal and audio, these two channels coming from Curitiba were easily received in Ponta Grossa.

Initially it operated from 4pm to 12:30am, relaying Rede Tupi's programming and inserting small news bulletins and sports programs which, together, summed up 15 minutes of programming a day, the local airtime, then as now, was limited.

Tupi ended up closing its doors on July 18, 1980, when seven of its stations (and its two flagships) closed, and TV Esplanada, facing the Tupi crisis, joined Rede Bandeirantes in 1979, which in those years had become a national network. At the same time, Pedro Wosgrau Filho, who was part of the inaugural shareholders, assumed control of the station.

In 1992, TV Esplanada is acquired by Grupo Paranaense de Comunicação, and becomes a component of Rede Paranaense. The station leaves Rede Bandeirantes and becomes an affiliate of Rede Globo. In mid-2000, it was renamed RPC TV Esplanada, adopting the new name of the state's network and used as reference to the other assets that were part of the group's "umbrella".

== Programming ==
Aside from relaying Globo's national programming and RPC's statewide output, RPC Londrina produces local editions of its newscasts:

- Bom Dia Paraná
- Meio Dia Paraná
- Boa Noite Paraná

== Technical information ==
=== Subchannels ===
Channel	Video	Aspect	Short name	Programming
7.1	1080i	16:9	RPC TV	Main RPC programming / TV Globo

The station started its experimental digital broadcasts in August 2012, on UHF channel 42, becoming the first station in Ponta Grossa to do so. On December 11, the station officially launched its digital signal, with an event held at its headquarters. Its programs were produced in high definition starting May 28, 2014.

=== Analog-to-digital conversion ===
On January 31, 2018, RPC Ponta Grossa discontinued its analog signal on VHF channel 7 complying an order by ANATEL regarding the shutdown of analog television. This coincided with the end of analog TV signals in Curitiba.
