= Eugênio Chipkevitch =

Ukrainian-born Brazilian child molester

Eugênio Chipkevitch (born April 26, 1954) is a Ukrainian-born Brazilian former physician and psychotherapist, convicted of sexually abusing adolescent patients at the "Paulista Adolescents Institute" at São Paulo. He also recorded his assaults, which were found in a trash bin by a telephone technician, who reported the matter to authorities. He was arrested and sentenced to 114 years imprisonment for violent indecent assault and child grooming.

== Biography ==
=== Childhood and youth ===
Eugênio Chipkevitch was born in a Jewish family in 1954, in the Ukrainian SSR, then part of the Soviet Union. Together with his parents, the family fled the country due to the harsh regime, moving to Brazil. After he was naturalized, Chipkevitch became a respected medical and academic professional.

He graduated from the University of São Paulo's Faculty of Medicine in 1978, quickly becoming the head of the Adolescent Service at the "Children's Hospital Darcy Vargas" at São Paulo. Chipkevitch was also a member of other associations, such as the "Society for Research on Adolescence from the United States.

Chipkevitch was also ranked among the 2,000 most important scientists of the 20th century, as an entry in the respected publication Who's Who in Science and Engineering, for introducing the medical specialty hebiatrics in Brazil.

=== Paulista Adolescents Institute ===
While working in the clinic, he had a register of about 2,000 clients, who paid above-average fees to be attended to by the reputed doctor. His books were also adopted by various universities.

== Crimes ==
In 2002, a technician from a telephone company, who was helping a colleague repair a telephone line, was surprised to see a large square-shaped trash bag next to the pole in a rubbish dump. Curious, he peeked inside, and noticed that there were several video tapes in portable camcorder format.

He decided to take them home, to find out which ones were good quality, while he would discard the others. A total of 35 ribbons were found in the trash bag. While watching the tapes, the technician was surprised to see a man abusing young people. In the following days, he passed the tapes to Rede Globo, the SBT and the Civil Police.

In more than 15 hours of recordings, of which only a small portion was aired, scenes of sexual abuse were committed against about 40 victims – all boys, aged between 8 and 17 years. The doctor sedated the patients under the pretext of vaccinating them, then stripped them and settled them on a stretcher. While unconscious, he caressed them, picked them up and fondled their genitals. On the night of March 20, 2002, pictures were aired on Programo do Ratinho, showing Chipkevitch molesting his patients.

When the recordings aired, the doctor's identity was still unknown. But the mother of one of Chipkevitch's patients watched the show, realising who it was, and that same evening filed a complaint to the police. The day after, the doctor was arrested at home, and police quickly began work on identifying the victims. The case quickly gained widespread attention in the media.

Computers were seized to find out if Chipkevitch advertised child pornography over the Internet. No such thing was found, although pictures of naked children were found in his car. Before his arrest, he was about to release another book, titled "Adolescence: The Secrets That Children Don't Tell", which would be released at the Book Festival in April. The book was suspended for publication when Chipkevitch's crimes were revealed, with his medical license permanently revoked.

The lawsuit proceeded swiftly, and was finalized in 2004. The doctor was sentenced in the first instance to a total penalty of 128 years imprisonment, plus fines for indecent assault with presumed violence, since the victims were unable to defend themselves. The penalty was compounded by the fact that he used his position as a doctor to commit the crimes. Subsequently, the Court of Justice reduced the sentence to 114 years, keeping the closed regime. Chipkevitch is serving his sentence at a prison in Sorocaba, which houses predominantly rapists and child molesters.
