= Rozângela Justino case =

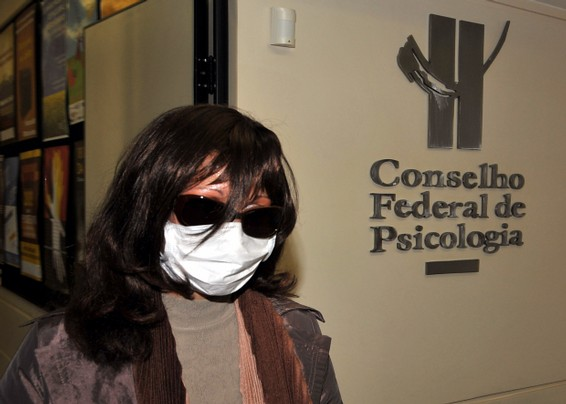
Rozângela Justino in July 2009, upon confirmation of the public censure by the CFP.

The Rozângela Justino case refers to the legal actions initiated by the Brazilian Federal Council of Psychology (CFP) against the Brazilian psychologist and missionary Rozângela Alves Justino for offering conversion therapy for homosexuality.

The Federal Council of Psychology confirmed the public censure previously imposed by the Regional Council of Psychology of Rio de Janeiro, stating that Justino's conduct contradicts the World Health Organization's (WHO) determination of 17 May 1990, which removed homosexuality from the list of mental disorders after other psychiatric organizations, such as the American Psychiatric Association and the American Psychological Association, had done the same in previous decades.

Resolution No. 001/99, from the CFP itself, made on 22 March 1999, states that "homosexuality does not constitute a disease, nor a disorder, nor a perversion" and that, therefore, "psychologists will not collaborate with events and services that propose treatment and cure of homosexuality".

== Background ==
In 2007, a gay rights NGO based in Nova Iguaçu filed a complaint against Justino with the Regional Council of Psychology of Rio de Janeiro, which decided at the end of that year to publicly censure her.

Having appealed that decision, the Brazilian Federal Council of Psychology upheld the public censure on 31 July 2009. The Brazilian Federal Council of Psychology stated that, by offering therapy to help homosexuals leave their homosexuality, Justino violated CFP Resolution No. 001/99, of March 22, 1999.

Justino's lawyer stated that she would appeal the decision to the ordinary courts, and Justino said she would continue to offer the same treatment. A day before the appeal hearing, the Associação Brasileira de Gays, Lésbicas, Bissexuais, Travestis e Transexuais (ABGLT) filed a petition with the Federal Council of Psychology, containing signatures from 133 organizations, requesting the maintenance of the public censure. They also submitted a representation to the Regional Council of Psychology of Rio de Janeiro requesting the revocation of the professional's registration, a process that was awaiting the conclusion of the censure request. Nine days before the decision, on July 22nd, Rozangela had filed a writ of mandamus in the 15th Federal Court of the Federal District, requesting the suspension of the process, alleging the unconstitutionality of Resolution No. 01/1999 of the Federal Council of Psychology, but on July 30th, one day before the decision, the injunction was denied.

== Controversy ==
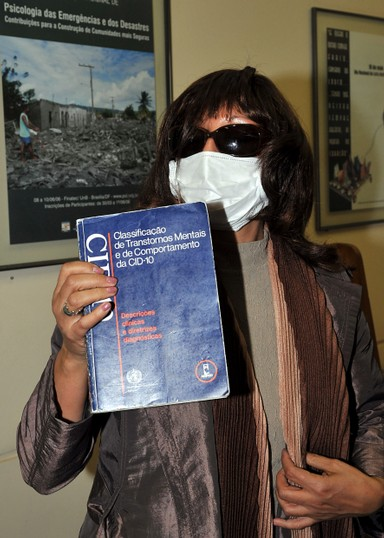
Rozângela Justino in July 2009.

The bishop of the Diocese of Recife of the Anglican Church of the Southern Cone of America, Robinson Cavalcanti, declared his support for the psychologist, considering the outcome of the trial an "act of heterophobic persecution by the Federal Council of Psychology." During the 2009 proceedings, Justino only admitted to being photographed in disguise, claiming to be persecuted and comparing gay rights activism to Nazism, stating that "pro-homosexuality activism is directly linked to Nazism. All social deconstruction movements study Nazism because they share an ideal of global political and economic domination."

In 2017, she was one of the authors of a lawsuit challenging resolution 01/1999 of the Federal Council of Psychology. A preliminary injunction issued by federal judge Waldemar Cláudio de Carvalho, while maintaining the validity of the resolution, allowed psychologists to perform "sexual conversion therapies". This decision was overturned in 2019 by order of Cármen Lúcia, a justice of the Supreme Federal Court, at the request of the CFP.

Rozangela holds a commissioned position as an advisor in the office of federal deputy and evangelical pastor Sóstenes Cavalcante. In 2022, her registration with the Regional Council of Psychology of the Federal District was revoked for continuing to offer sexual conversion therapy, preventing her from practicing the profession.

== See also ==
- Discrimination against LGBTQ people in Brazil
- LGBTQ rights in Brazil
- Conversion therapy
