= RPC Foz do Iguaçu =

RPC Foz do Iguaçu (ZYB 408)
Foz do Iguaçu, Paraná; Brazil
- Channels: Digital: 35 (UHF); Virtual: 5
- Branding: RPC

Programming
- Affiliations: TV Globo

Ownership
- Owner: Grupo Paranaense de Comunicação; (TV Cataratas Ltda.)

History
- First air date: July 1, 1989
- Former names: TV Cataratas (1989-2000); RPC TV Cataratas (2000-2010); RPC TV Foz do Iguaçu (2010-2014)
- Former channel numbers: Analog: 5 (VHF, 1989-2018)

Technical information
- Licensing authority: ANATEL
- HAAT: 11kW

Links
- Website: redeglobo.globo.com/RPC

RPC Foz do Iguaçu is a Brazilian television station, headquartered in Foz do Iguaçu, a city in the state of Paraná, located on the Paraguayan border. It operates on channel 5 (35 UHF digital) and is affiliated with TV Globo. It belongs to the Paranaense Communication Group (GRPCOM, former RPC Group). Its signal reaches some cities in Paraguay, and even some points in Argentina, which are part of the border with Brazil, by means of spillover.

== History ==
The station was the second in Foz do Iguaçu to be founded locally, nearly four years after TV Naipi, currently a part of Rede Massa's statewide network. TV Cataratas made its first broadcast on July 1, 1989. The license, signed by President José Sarney, served at the benefit of businessman Francisco Cunha Pereira, the main shareholder of Rede Paranaense de Televisão. With its launch, RPTV now had four stations. At launch, the station hired journalist Dina Oro, formerly from TV Naipi. At the beginning, the station broadcast from a rented house in the city center, with reports being produced at the Telepar tower.

The station reported events that often had international relevance, including official visits of heads of state to the Iguaçu Falls.

On October 6, 2008, RPC TV Cataratas started producing the entirety of the first edition of Paraná TV locally, becoming the only such station to do so in the interior of the state.

== Technical information ==
=== Subchannels ===
Channel	Video	Aspect	Short name	Programming
5.1	1080i	16:9	RPC TV	Main RPC programming / TV Globo

Digital broadcasts started on December 7, 2010, with significant overspill in the Paraguayan and Argentine sides of the border. RPC spent R$3,5 million in implementing the technology. For this end, the TV tower in Foz do Iguaçu was illuminated by LED lights, in red, green and white until December 25, and, from December 26 to January 1, for the new year, in blue and green, RPC's colors.
