= RPC Guarapuava =

RPC Guarapuava (ZYB 409)
- Guarapuava, Paraná; Brazil
- Channels: Digital: 32 (UHF); Virtual: 2
- Branding: RPC

Programming
- Affiliations: TV Globo

Ownership
- Owner: Grupo Paranaense de Comunicação

History
- First air date: November 25, 1989
- Former names: TV Independência Guarapuava (1989-1993); TV Guairacá (1993-2000); RPC TV Guairacá (2000-2010); RPC TV Guarapuava (2010-2014)
- Former channel numbers: Analog: 2 (VHF, 1989-2018)

Technical information
- Licensing authority: ANATEL
- HAAT: 11kW

Links
- Website: redeglobo.globo.com/RPC

RPC Guarapuava is a Brazilian television station, headquartered in Guarapuava, a city in the state of Paraná. It operates on channel 2 (32 UHF digital) and is affiliated with TV Globo.

== History ==
The station was founded on November 25, 1989, as TV Independência Guarapuava, a Rede Manchete affiliate owned by Sistema Sul de Comunicação (currently Grupo RIC, owner of RIC TV, a network of Record affiliates). The station was the fourth in the system, serving an estimated audience of 1,3 million. The station was later renamed TV Guairacá and became a Band affiliate in 1993.

In November 2000, RPC bought the station from J. Malluceli, and, consequently, became a TV Globo affiliate. The move meant the replacement of the news program produced by the Band O&O in Curitiba by a local newscast generated directly from Guarapuava. The first two months were used to prepare its staff, with the station producing pilots of the local Paraná TV, only to be reviewed by the main station in Curitiba. The approval meant that a segment of the second edition of Paraná TV would be produced locally. The first official newscast premiered on February 19, 2001. Until then, Guarapuava was dependent on TV Esplanada for Globo's coverage, which was rebroadcast on channel 11. Until mid-2002, the station had no infrastructure to produce live segments, meaning that the local news had to be pre-recorded. A new staff was hired in 2004 and the news operation entered a new phase on February 8, 2004.

== Technical information ==
=== Subchannels ===
| Channel | Video | Aspect | Short name | Programming |
|---|---|---|---|---|
| 2.1 | 1080i | 16:9 | RPC TV | Main RPC programming / TV Globo |

The station started digital broadcasts on December 6, 2012, through physical channel 32 for Guarapuava and adjacent areas.

In May 2014, RPC Guarapuava started producing local news in high definition.

The station shut down its analog signal on February 27, 2021.
