= Brazilian Congressional Bill No. 122 =

Brazilian bill

Brazilian Congressional Bill No. 122 of 2006, (Note: Abbreviated as PLC 122/2006 or PL 122) also known as the anti-homophobia law (Brazilian Portuguese: Lei anti-homofobia) or Alexandre Ivo Law, (Brazilian Portuguese: Lei Alexandre Ivo) was a Brazilian bill introduced by then-Congresswoman Iara Bernardi (PT -SP). The bill aimed to criminalize homophobia in the country and was shelved after spending eight years in the Senate without approval. It was considered constitutional by important jurists, including two ministers of the Supreme Federal Court (STF). The immediate approval of specific legislation to criminalize homophobia is considered "urgently" necessary in the country by some legal experts. However, according to some Christian entities (especially Catholic and Protestant), the bill violates religious freedom and freedom of expression by providing for imprisonment (up to 5 years) for public criticism of homosexuality, regardless of the reason. However, this was not included in the text of the bill.

The Bill 122 proposed the criminalization of prejudices motivated by sexual orientation and gender identity, equating them to other prejudices already covered by Law 7716/89. This bill was initiated in the Chamber of Deputies, authored by former deputy Iara Bernardi and processed there under number 5003/2001, which in the wording approved by the Chamber proposed, in addition to criminal penalties, also additional civil penalties for homophobic prejudice, such as the loss of office for public servants, disqualification from contracts with the public administration, prohibition of access to credit from official banks and the prohibition of tax benefits.

According to a telephone survey conducted by DataSenado in 2008 with 1120 people from all five regions of Brazil, 70% of respondents were in favor of criminalizing discrimination against homosexuals in the country. Approval is widespread across almost all segments, by region, sex, and age. Even the breakdown by religion shows approval of 54% among evangelicals, 70% among Catholics and adherents of other religions, and 79% among atheists. Among those aged 16-29, 76% supported the bill. Also according to the survey, people with higher levels of education tend to be more in favor of the bill – 78% of people with higher education and 55% of people with a 4th-grade education. However, another DataSenado poll, this one conducted in 2009 with four hundred thousand people online, indicated that 51.5% of Brazilians are against Bill 122, while 48.5% are in favor.

== Background ==
To try to reach an agreement with religious entities that oppose the bill, Senator Marta Suplicy, rapporteur of Bill 122 in the Senate, modified the text to protect religious worship from criminalization. The modification states that the new legislation "does not apply to the peaceful expression of thought arising from faith and morality founded on freedom of conscience, belief and religion." However, the new text was rejected by LGBTQ rights advocates, who considered that the alteration distorts the original objective of the law, and was still not enough to win the support of the evangelical caucus in parliament. Bill 122 was to be voted on in the Senate Human Rights Committee on December 8, 2011, but its vote was eventually postponed.

== Public opinion ==
=== Support ===
Some legal experts argue that specific legislation criminalizing homophobia is "urgently" needed in Brazil given the lack of laws addressing discrimination based on sexual orientation and the spikes in violence. Similarly, in November 2010, LGBTQ organizations and members of parliament held a demonstration on Paulista Avenue in São Paulo to advocate for the approval of Bill 122, following emblematic episodes of aggression against homosexuals on that same avenue and in Rio de Janeiro.

Legal experts interviewed by the Folha de S.Paulo newspaper, including former Supreme Court Justice Marco Aurélio Mello, unanimously stated that the bill does not threaten the principle of freedom of expression, does not create a new crime, and is constitutional. In 2011, former Supreme Court Justice Ayres Britto, also in an interview with Folha, stated that he is in favor of a bill that criminalizes homophobia. According to Britto: "The homophobe exacerbates his prejudice to such an extent that he wallows in the mire of hatred. And the fact is that hate crimes are a hair's breadth away from violent crimes."

For Senator Eduardo Suplicy (PT-SP), the project is "one of the most revolutionary in this House [ the Federal Senate], because it gives us very clearly the notion of the respect we must have for any human being, whoever they may be." Congressman Jean Wyllys also declared his support for the bill. According to him: "What we need is a law that equates homophobia with racism and anti-Semitism, and that is what the original bill does."

=== Oppose ===
Some groups, mostly Christian (Catholic and Protestant), oppose the text of Bill 122, claiming that it violates the principle of freedom of expression. These groups assert that, as the bill was written, any expression criticizing the conduct of homosexuals could be characterized as discrimination or prejudice. They also claim that the bill infringes on religious freedom and creates a privileged caste. A petition with over 1 million signatures against the bill was delivered to the president of the Senate.

On June 1, 2011, more than 25,000 Protestants and Catholics protested in front of the Brazilian National Congress against Bill 122. On the same day, on the Manhã no Parlamento program on Rádio Câmara, Pastor Silas Malafaia, of the Assembly of God, accused Bill 122 of creating unconstitutional privileges for homosexuals, saying, "There is a glaring difference between criticizing a certain conduct and discriminating against people" and also, "What they can't stand is criticism." At the 2011 March for Jesus, Silas Malafaia criticized the approval of same-sex civil unions, instructing his followers not to vote for politicians who support Bill 122.
