= Ratinho (footballer, born 1942) =

Brazilian footballer

Personal information
- Full name: Heitor Martinho de Souza
- Date of birth: 3 March 1942
- Place of birth: São Francisco do Sul, Brazil
- Date of death: 11 February 2001 (aged 58)
- Place of death: Balneário Barra do Sul, Brazil
- Height: 1.62 m (5 ft 4 in)
- Position: Right winger

Senior career*
Years	Team	Apps	(Gls)
1961–1962	Fluminense-SC		
1962–1965	Marcílio Dias		
1965–1972	Portuguesa	242	(56)
1973–1974	São Paulo	30	(3)
1976–1978	Joinville		
- * Club domestic league appearances and goals as of 26 February 2024

Heitor Martinho de Souza (3 March 1942 – 11 February 2001), better known as Ratinho, was a Brazilian professional footballer who played as a right winger.

== Career ==
Ratinho (little mouse), a nickname given to the fact that the player was fast and daring, began his professional career at Fluminense de Joinville. In 1962 he arrived at Marcílio Dias, being part of the state champion squad in 1963. He arrived at Portuguesa in 1966 and made 242 appearances for the club, scoring 56 goals. After disagreements with the president of Portuguesa, Oswaldo Texeira Duarte, he went to São Paulo, where he played little, mostly as a substitute, making 30 appearances and scoring just 3 goals. In 1976, he was one of the first reinforcements of the recently created Joinville EC (after the merger between América and Caxias), being state champion in 1976 and 1978. After retiring, he worked as the club's football director.

== Honours ==
Marcílio Dias

- Campeonato Catarinense: 1963

Joinville

- Campeonato Catarinense: 1976, 1978

== Death ==
Ratinho died in a car accident on 11 February 2001, in Balneário Barra do Sul, Santa Catarina.
