= TV Cidade (Londrina) =

TV Cidade (ZYB 407)
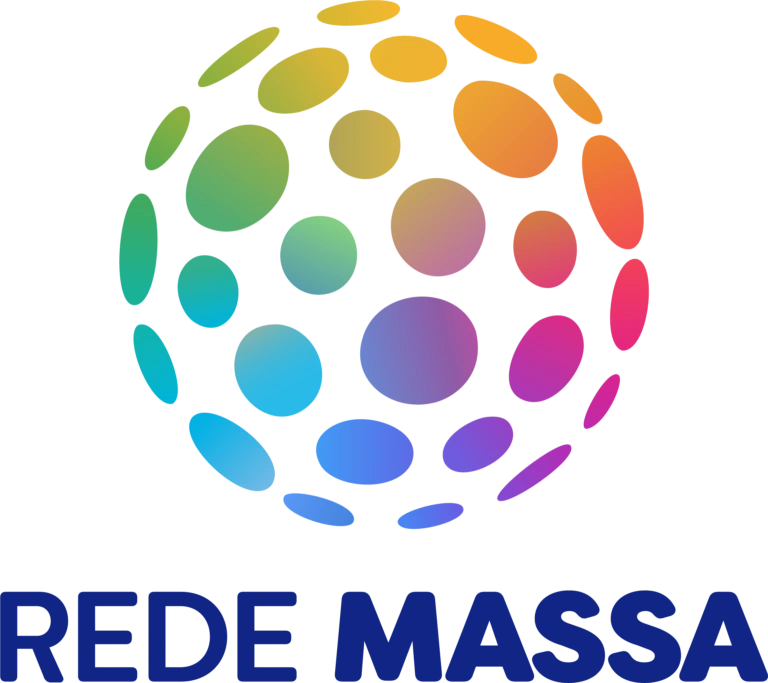
- Londrina, Paraná; Brazil
- Channels: Digital: 23 (UHF); Virtual: 5
- Branding: Rede Massa

Programming
- Affiliations: SBT

Ownership
- Owner: Grupo Massa; (Televisão Cidade Ltda.)

History
- First air date: April 17, 1989
- Former channel numbers: Analog: 5 (VHF, 1989-2018)

Technical information
- Licensing authority: ANATEL
- ERP: 4.4 kW
- Transmitter coordinates: 23°17′59.8″S 51°11′10.1″W

Links
- Public license information: Profile
- Website: redemassa.com.br

TV Cidade (channel 5) is a Brazilian television station licensed to Londrina, Paraná, Brazil, affiliated with SBT. The station is part of Rede Massa and covers 54 municipalities in the northeast of the state.

== History ==
Paulo Pimentel's TV Cidade was established on April 17, 1989, becoming the last of the four stations to be opened under his control, as well as the first after the fall of the military dictatorship, the license for which was granted by president José Sarney. The station started broadcasting from its current facilities in 1993.

A fire hit its building on February 11, 2008, consuming an area of 150 square meters, which encompassed two studios. The staff who left the building did not suffer any damage. On the day of the fire, it leased studios owned by a local video production company. A temporary solution with CNT Tropical was approved, using its studios for its local programming. The fire was contained within hours and regular operations resumed in the early evening.

On July 29, 2019, it started airing the local edition of Primeiro Impacto.

On June 24, 2025, the station hired Felipe Macedo, alias Macedão da Chinelada, who left SBT the previous month. He became the presenter of the local edition of Tribuna da Massa, at the request of Carlos Massa, the owner of the Rede Massa compound.

== Programming ==
Aside from relaying SBT's national programming, TV Cidade produces and airs the following programs:

- Primeiro Impacto Paraná: news, with Gelson Negrão;
- Destaque: variety program, with Cloara Pinheiro;
- Tribuna da Massa: news, with Felipe Macedo;
- Show de Bola: sports news, with Izadora Bicalho;
- Cidade Entrevista: interview program, with Raquel Rodrigues;

Relayed from TV Iguaçu

- Salada Mista: comedy program, with Rafael Massa e Hallorino Júnior;
- SBT Paraná: news, with Simone Munhoz;
- Armazém da Massa: musical program, with Camilinho Reis

== Technical information ==
=== Subchannels ===
Channel	Video	Aspect	Short name	Programming
3.1	1080i	16:9	Rede Massa	Main TV Cidade programming / SBT

=== Analog-to-digital conversion ===
On November 28, 2018, TV Cidade discontinued its analog signal on VHF channel 5 complying an order by ANATEL regarding the shutdown of analog television in Londrina.
