= Massa FM =

Brazilian radio network

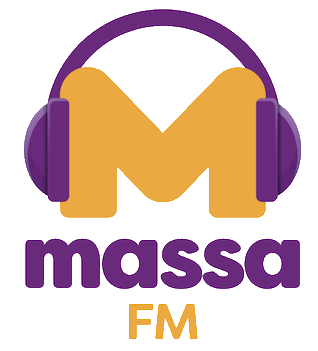
- Country: Brazil
- Headquarters: Curitiba, Paraná, Brazil

Programming
- Language(s): Portuguese

Ownership
- Owner: Grupo Massa
- Sister stations: Rede Massa

History
- Launch date: January 1, 2006

Links
- Webcast: Listen live
- Website: massa.com.br/fm

Massa FM is a Brazilian radio network headquartered in Curitiba, Paraná, where it broadcasts on the frequency 97.7 MHz. However, the network's national programming is produced from its station in São Paulo, on 92.9 MHz. The network has over ninety affiliates across all five regions of Brazil. Massa FM is owned by the Grupo Massa, a media conglomerate belonging to businessman and television presenter Carlos Roberto Massa, known as Ratinho.

== History ==
The Massa FM network was launched in January 2006 with its first station in Curitiba, replacing the local Band FM affiliate at 97.9 MHz (which moved to 97.7 MHz during the transition). The broadcast license had already been owned by Grupo Massa since it operated as Estação FM and later as Band FM starting in 2003, as the Grupo Bandeirantes sought to strengthen its brand in Paraná. Throughout the same year, the network expanded within the state, with stations launching in Maringá (replacing Mais FM), Londrina (October 2008), the coast (Massa FM Litoral in Paranaguá, replacing Super Nova/Tropical FM in August 2009), and later in Telêmaco Borba and Siqueira Campos.

Grupo Massa later announced plans to transform Massa FM from a statewide into a national network, expanding beyond Paraná to include affiliates in states like São Paulo and Santa Catarina—a strategy opposite to that of major networks based in the Rio-São Paulo axis. The first São Paulo affiliate launched in Campinas on April 8, 2013, on 99.7 FM, replacing Band FM, with a major inauguration event in Amparo. However, on February 28, 2015, the Campinas station ceased broadcasting Massa FM's programming and was replaced by Rede do Coração. This marked the network's return to being a statewide operation, with its programming once again restricted to Paraná.

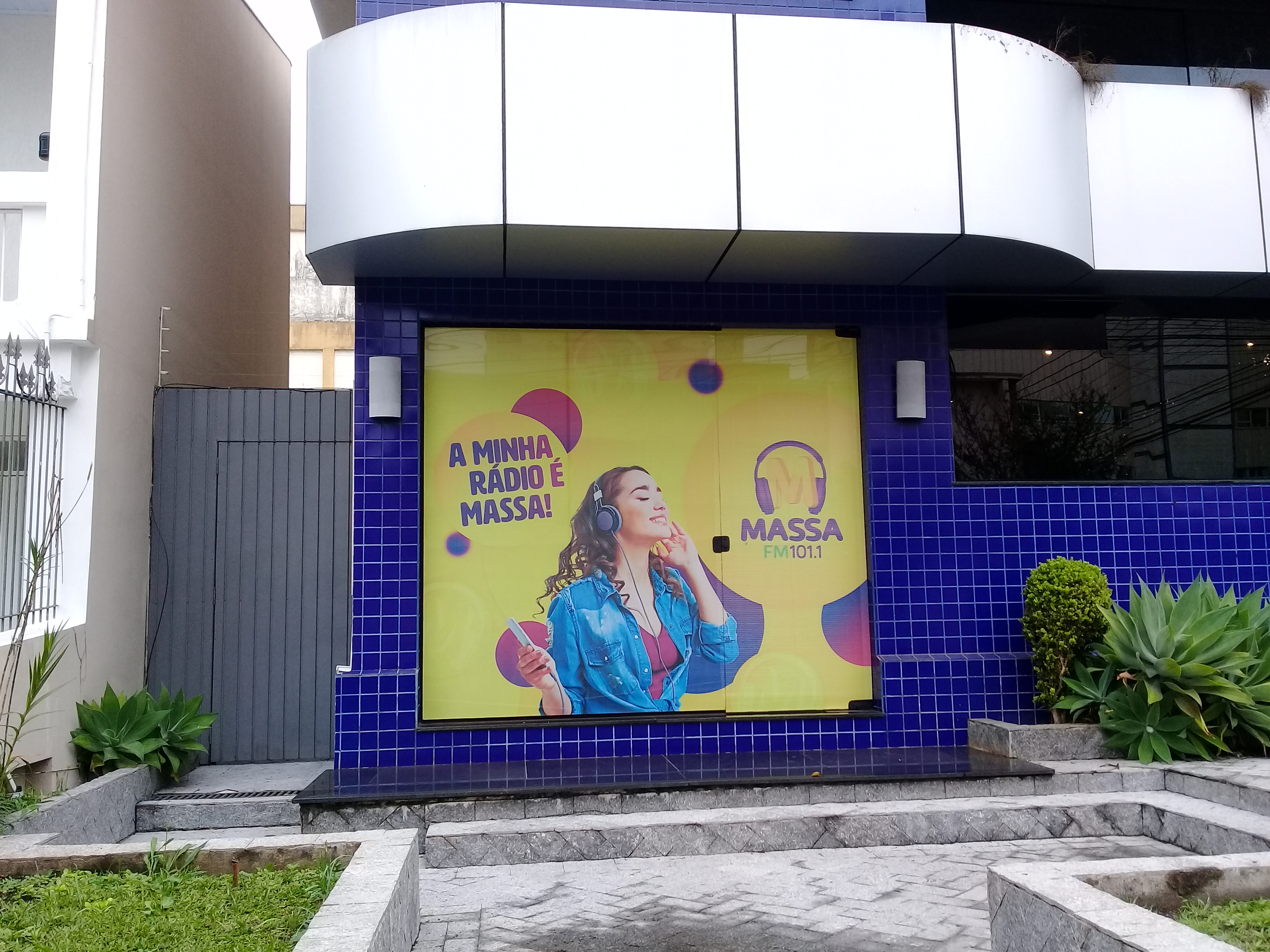
Front view of the Massa FM Ponta Grossa studios

After a period of stagnation, the Massa FM Network resumed its expansion in 2016, forming a wide-reaching network primarily across neighboring regions of Paraná and Santa Catarina. Affiliates typically joined the network's live feed daily at noon (the time programming is generated from its headquarters). The network's growth strategy capitalized on the migration of many AM stations to the FM band, leveraging political connections, the strength of its brand, and its successful performance in the capital city of Paraná.

The first affiliate in Santa Catarina was established in Lages in 2016, replacing Rádio CBN. This marked the beginning of a significant expansion phase. Throughout 2017 and 2018, the network entered new markets, including Ouro Fino in Minas Gerais (June 2017) and several key cities in Santa Catarina through a partnership with Rede Guararema, launching in Blumenau (August 2017), Brusque (September 2017), and Florianópolis (December 2017). The network also returned to the state of São Paulo in Lucélia and expanded within Paraná to cities like Ponta Grossa (October 2017) and Guarapuava (January 2018). The model often involved acquiring or replacing existing stations, particularly those migrating from AM to FM.

Expansion continued aggressively into 2018 and 2019, reaching new states and solidifying its national presence. The network debuted in Assis Chateaubriand and Céu Azul in Paraná, entered Rondônia with seven planned affiliates via a partnership with Grupo Meridional, and announced its arrival in Rio Grande do Sul (Nova Prata) and São Paulo (São Sebastião). A significant milestone was the announcement of an affiliate in Chapecó, Santa Catarina, in May 2019, which would become the network's first to broadcast live football, specifically Chapecoense matches. This period transformed Massa FM from a primarily state-focused network into a significant national player.

On June 24, 2019, the network announced its second owned-and-operated station, to be established in São Paulo, marking its entry into Brazil's largest market, where its commercial department was already headquartered, following the purchase of the 92.9 frequency from Grupo Estadão, which had been rebroadcasting Feliz FM. In July, Massa FM debuted in Mato Grosso do Sul with a station in Nova Andradina on 99.5, owned by Grupo Medeiros de Comunicação. In August, affiliates were launched in Ivaiporã, Paraná (100.7, replacing Ivaiporã FM) and Cascavel, Paraná (98.9, replacing Nacional News, resulting from the migration of AM 1340), as well as a station based in José Bonifácio serving São José do Rio Preto in northwestern São Paulo on 107.3, taking over from Vale FM.
