= Rede Massa =

Rádio e Televisão Iguaçu S/A.
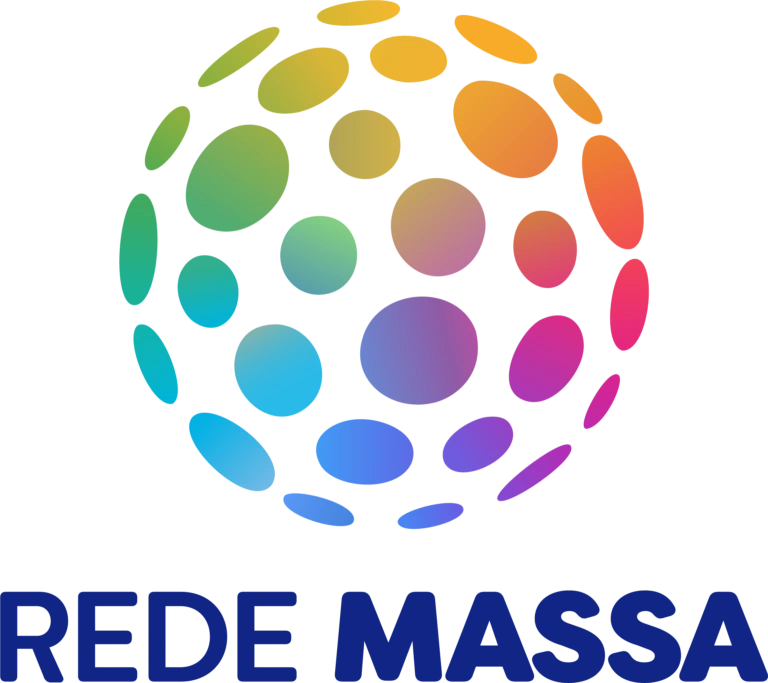
- Type: Broadcast television network
- Country: Brazil
- Availability: Paraná
- Founded: 17 March 2008 by Carlos Roberto Massa
- Key people: Gabriel Massa (president); Marco Gomes; Marta Gleich
- Launch date: 27 December 1967 (TV Iguaçu)
- Affiliation: SBT (1981-)

Rede Massa is a Brazilian regional television network based in Curitiba, capital of the state of Paraná. It is owned by presenter and businessman Carlos Roberto Massa (popularly known as Ratinho) and is affiliated with Sistema Brasileiro de Televisão. It was inaugurated on March 17, 2008, as part of a strategy to unite the stations belonging to the Paulo Pimentel Group, which went on sale in April that year. Its generators are TV Iguaçu (Curitiba), TV Tibagi (Apucarana and Maringá), TV Guará (Francisco Beltrão and Ponta Grossa), TV Cidade (Londrina) and TV Naipi (Foz do Iguaçu).

== History ==
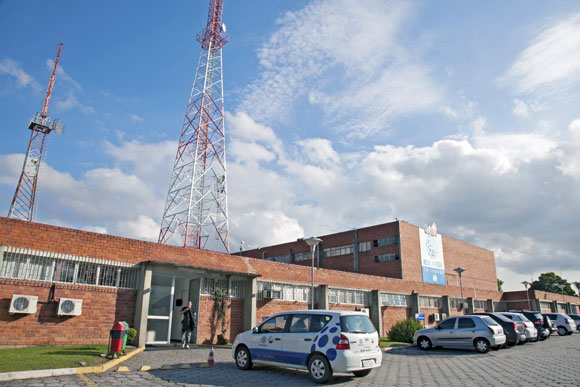
Headquarters of the main station in the Mercês neighborhood in Curitiba.

It was officially founded on March 17, 2008, as a result of the purchase of four television stations owned by Grupo Paulo Pimentel and affiliated with SBT for the entire state of Paraná, by the presenter and businessman Carlos Roberto Massa (Ratinho). Rede Massa has five affiliated stations in the state: TV Iguaçu (Curitiba), TV Tibagi (Apucarana and Maringá), TV Cidade (Londrina) and TV Naipi (Foz do Iguaçu) and in August 2012 the group's 5th broadcaster, TV Guará, in Ponta Grossa. Also part of the group are the radio stations Massa FM from Curitiba, Maringá, Londrina, Paranaguá and Ponta Grossa then governor of Paraná, Paulo Pimentel, founder and former owner of the newspapers O Estado do Paraná and Tribuna do Paraná.

The network of stations belonging to Grupo Paulo Pimentel was almost sold at the end of April 2007 to the Monte Cristalina holding, belonging to João Alves de Queiroz Filho, Junior at Assolan. The deal was undone because of the fight between Paulo Cruz Pimentel and his son-in-law, Luiz Mussi.

On March 17, 2008, the group's four stations were sold to the presenter Ratinho, who renamed the network as Rede Massa.

In February 2021, the network was announced as the new broadcaster of the Campeonato Paranaense de Futebol.

On April 17, 2023, Rede Massa fired employees due to financial problems. In total, 15 employees were laid off, 7 of them permanent employees and 8 service providers, including reporters, cameramen and text and image editors.

== Programming ==
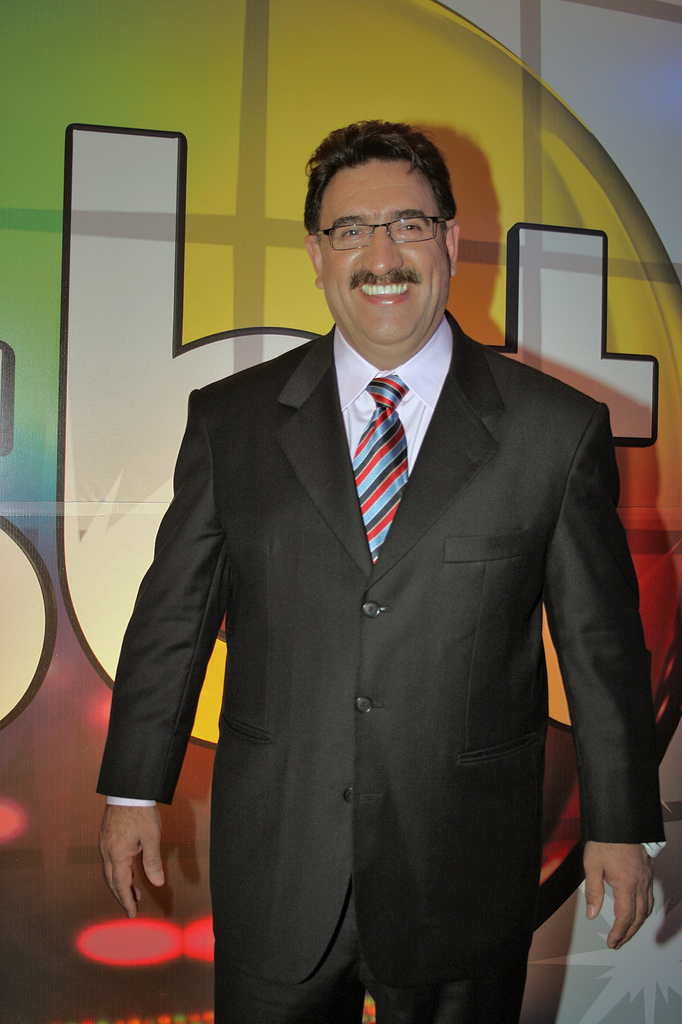
Ratinho, businessman and owner of Rede Massa.

Aside from relaying SBT's national line-up, the Rede Massa stations produce the following programs:

- Primeiro Impacto Paraná
- Destaque
- Show de Bola
- Tribuna da Massa
- Tribuna da Massa Especial
- Salada Mista
- SBT Notícias
- SBT Paraná
- Maringá Urgente
- Maringá Urgente Especial
- Massa Comunidade
- Cidade Entrevista

Independent productions

- Show da Fé (R. R. Soares)
- Paraná na Graça
- Hiper Sorte
- Vale Sorte
- Mundo da Pesca
- Lembranças com Água na Boca
- Programa do Darta
- Vamos às Compras
- Mais Casa
- Shop TV

=== Former programs ===
- Notícias da Massa
- Negócios da Terra
- Jornal da Massa
- Carros e Motores
- Empresas e Negócios
- ShopCar
- Naipi Comunidade (TV Naipi)
- Tribuna da Massa Manhã

== Network ==
Division of the coverage area of Rede Massa by station

- TV Iguaçu (purple) - It has a coverage area in 30 municipalities, with approximately 3.4 million inhabitants, reaching Curitiba and the metropolitan region. The oldest station in the network, third in Curitiba and fourth in the state of Paraná, it signed on in 1967;
- TV Naipi (yellow) - Has its coverage area in 77 municipalities in Paraná, in addition to reaching a considerable swathe of Argentine and Paraguayan territories, in a region that stands out for its tourist activity, commerce, agriculture and agroindustry, serving as the 'gateway' to Mercosur, the station signed on in 1985;
- TV Tibagi (blue) - The station with the largest coverage area, reaching 175 municipalities, of which Maringá, Apucarana, Campo Mourão, Cianorte, Guaíra, Paranavaí, and Umuarama stand out. The region has around 2.4 million inhabitants and a diversified economy and opened on 26 July 1969;
- TV Cidade (red) - Reaches different audiences with its local programming and with the broadcast of SBT's national programming. Created on April 17, 1989, it was the Group's fourth television station. It currently covers 54 municipalities, such as Londrina and Cambé, reaching around 1.4 million inhabitants;
- TV Guará (yellow) - The youngest of the five stations, founded in 2012, TV Guará covers the Campos Gerais region. Among the municipalities in its coverage area are Ponta Grossa, Guarapuava, Pato Branco and Francisco Beltrão, with Ponta Grossa being its headquarters.
