= RPC Curitiba =

RPC Curitiba (ZYB 391)
- Logo used since 2015
- Curitiba, Paraná; Brazil
- Channels: Digital: 41 (UHF); Virtual: 12
- Branding: RPC

Programming
- Affiliations: TV Globo

Ownership
- Owner: Grupo Paraense de Comunicação; (Sociedade Rádio Emissora Paranaense S.A.)
- Sister stations: 98 FM; Mundo Livre FM; Mix FM Curitiba

History
- First air date: October 29, 1960
- Former names: TV Paranaense (1960-2000); RPC TV Paranaense (2000-2010); RPC TV Curitiba (2010-2014)
- Former channel numbers: Analog: 12 (VHF, 1960-2018)
- Former affiliations: Emissoras Unidas/REI (1960-1967; 1972-1976); TV Excelsior (1965-1970)

Technical information
- Licensing authority: ANATEL
- ERP: 15.5 kW
- Transmitter coordinates: 25°25′1.7″S 49°17′14.8″W

Links
- Public license information: Profile
- Website: redeglobo.globo.com/RPC

RPC Curitiba (channel 12) is a Brazilian television station licensed to Curitiba, Paraná, Brazil, affiliated with TV Globo. The station is the flagship broadcast property of the locally based GRPCOM (Grupo Paranaense de Comunicação) which also owns several other stations under the RPC name in the state. The station's signal broadcasts throughout the Curitiba metropolitan area & its surroundings and its studios and tower are located in the Mercês neighborhood of Curitiba.

== History ==
Nagib Chede travelled to the United States in 1958 to purchase the equipment needed for his television station. At the time, Assis Chateaubriand's TV Paraná had been projected since 1956, but was facing indecision regarding its launch. This enabled Chede to make his station the first in the south, which eventually became a failed goal (due to the launch of TV Piratini in December 1959). Experimental broadcasts took place in the middle of 1960, starting at 8pm, with three or four employees and limited technical equipment.

TV Paranaense was founded on 29 October 1960 by businessman Nagib Chede, being the first television station in the state of Paraná and broadcasting on Channel 12 in Curitiba, in addition to being affiliated with Emissoras Unidas. The studio for the first broadcast was at Edifício ASA, when Chede rented two apartments to host the channel. The inauguration took place at 7pm that day, with the presence of Archbishop Dom Manuel da Silveira d’Elboux and the then mayor Iberê de Mattos. After the speech by the founder, Nagib Chede, an episode of the canned series Private Secretary was shown, being the first official program on TV Paranaense.

The station's first headquarters were on the 21st floor of the Tijucas Building, in the center of the capital. The station's first employees were, for the most part, from Rádio Clube Paranaense, of which Nagib Chede was the owner. In 1962, the station left the Tijucas Building for a large shed on Rua Emiliano Perneta, also in the Center, which made it possible to set up large scenes, such as that of the first local telenovela, A Última Carícia, shown two years later, in thirty chapters shown Mondays, Wednesdays and Fridays at 6:40pm. Despite its success, the following productions were not very popular.

In 1965, it was the first station in the state to use the videotape system. That same year, TV Paranaense started showing part of the Rede Excelsior's programs, especially musical shows and telenovelas. At that time the station's signal reached other locations such as Guarapuava, Palmas and União da Vitória, as well as relay stations in Santa Catarina, which did not yet have a television station. At the same time, the station was up against competition from TV Paraná, owned by Diários Associados by Assis Chateaubriand, and later from December 1967 from TV Iguaçu, owned by Paulo Pimentel.

In 1969, with the fierce competition from the two other stations, a crisis occurred that would culminate in the sale of controlling interest in the company to the lawyer Francisco Cunha Pereira Filho, director of the newspaper Gazeta do Povo, and to the bankers Edmundo Lemanski and Adolfo de Oliveira Franco Filho. With the acquisition, Francisco Cunha Pereira Filho transferred the station's headquarters to Castelo do Batel, the former residence of the former governor Moisés Lupion, becoming a reference point in the capital for more than thirty years.

In 1993, RPTV through TV Paranaense assisted in the production of the Globo telenovela Sonho Meu, set in Curitiba.

== Programming ==
Aside from broadcasting TV Globo's programs, RPC also produces and broadcasts the following local programs:

- Bom Dia Paraná
- Meio Dia Paraná
- Globo Esporte PR
- Boa Noite Paraná
- Bom Dia Sábado
- Meu Paraná
- Plug
- Estúdio C
- Caminhos do Campo
- Jornalismo RPC

== Technical information ==
=== Subchannels ===
Channel	Video	Aspect	Short name	Programming
12.1	1080i	16:9	RPC TV	Main RPC programming / TV Globo

On October 22, 2008, RPC TV Paranaense began broadcasting in HD being the first Globo station in southern Brazil to do so. As of 2013, the station's programs are broadcast in HD.

=== Analog-to-digital conversion ===
On January 31, 2018, RPC discontinued its analog signal on VHF channel 12 complying an order by ANATEL regarding the shutdown of analog television in Curitiba.
