= Balneário Barra do Sul =

- Municipality of Santa Catarina, Brazil
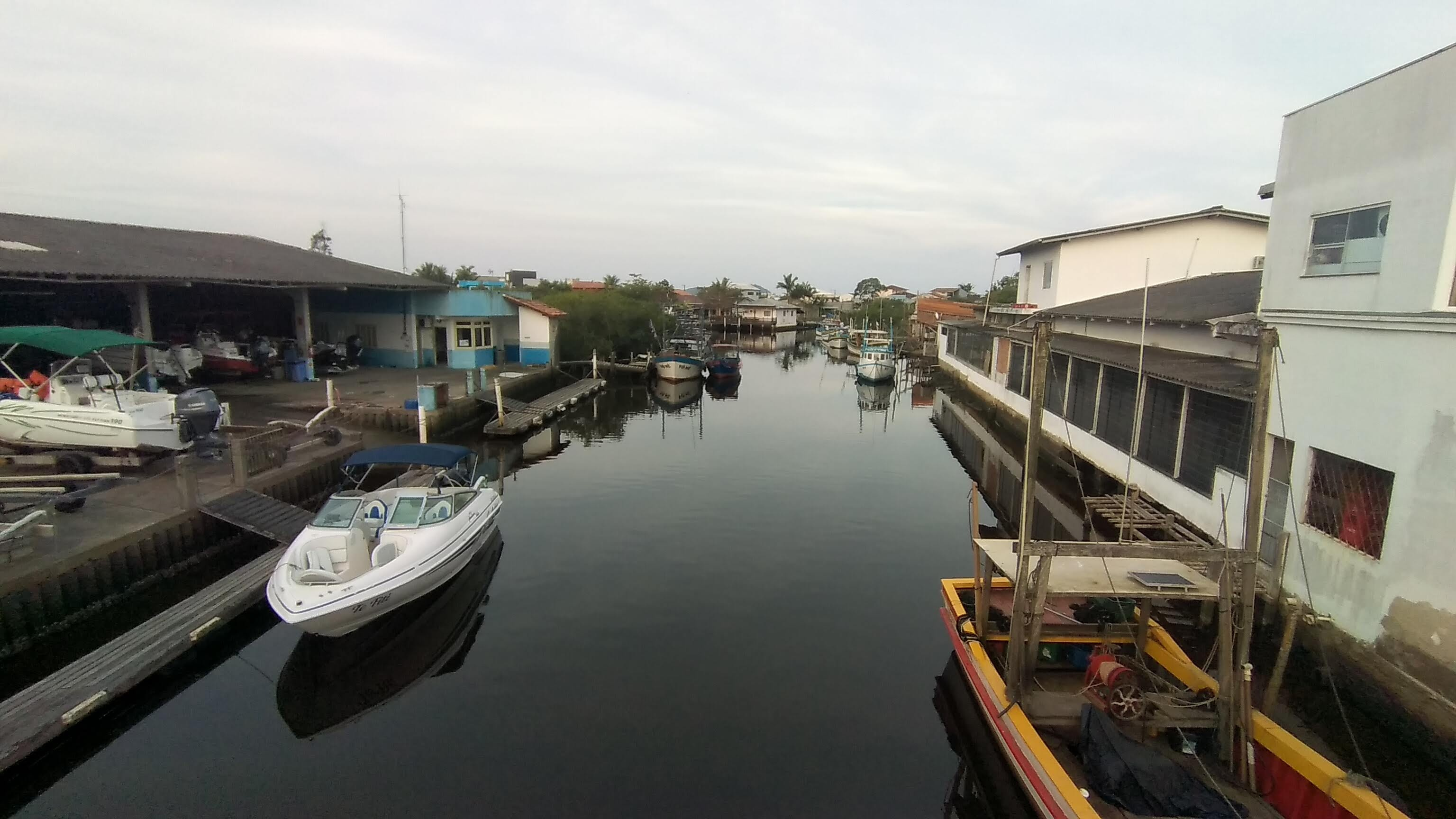
- Coastal inlet in Balneário Barra do Sul

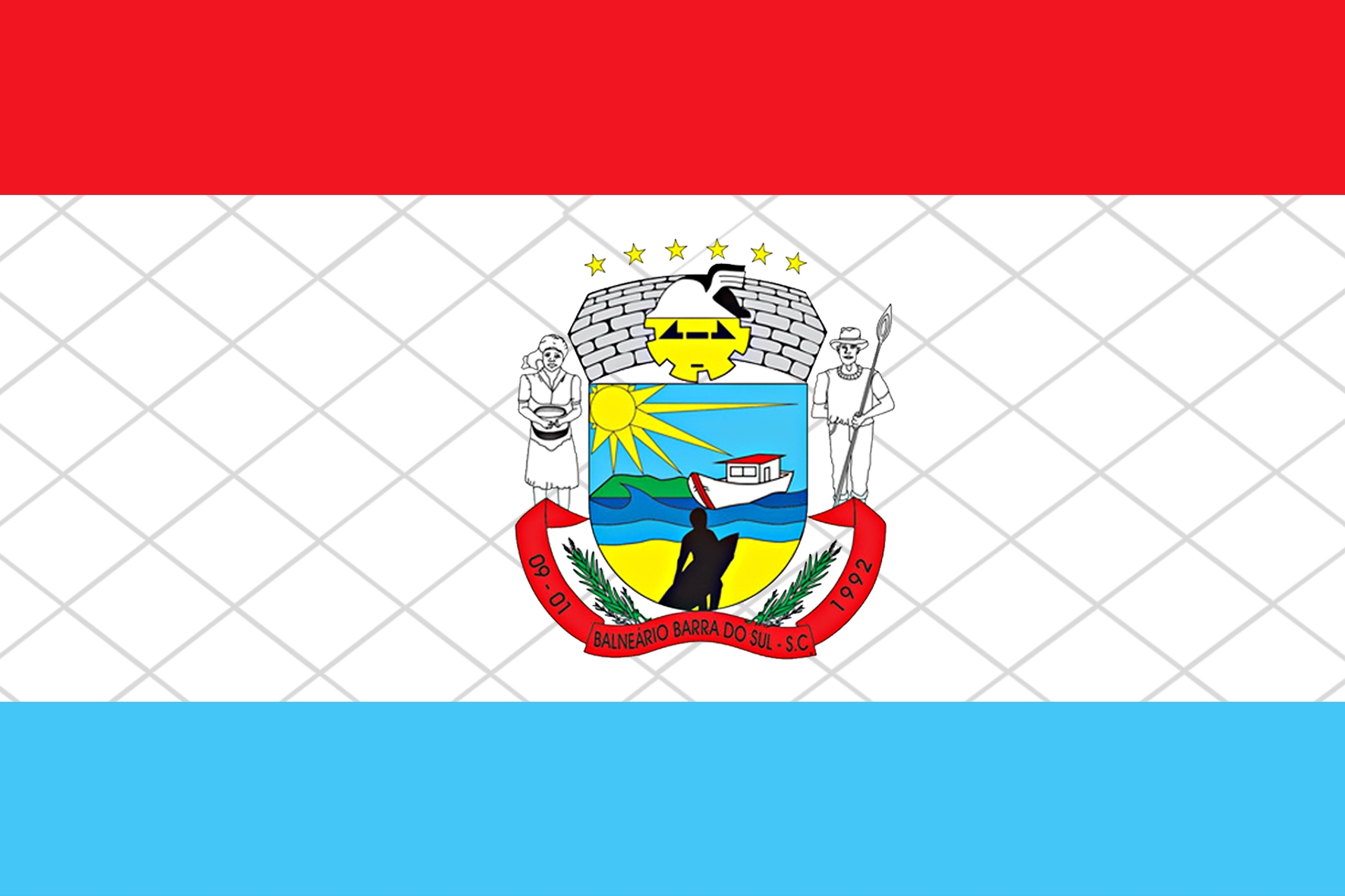
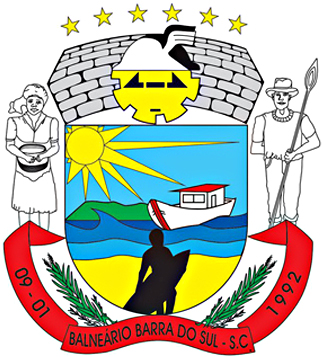
- Flag Coat of arms

- Location of Balneário Barra do Sul in Santa Catarina

- Location within Brazil Location within South America
- Coordinates: 26°27′26″S 48°36′41″W
- Country: Brazil
- Region: South
- State: Santa Catarina
- Founded: 9 January 1992

Government
  - Mayor: Ademar Henrique Borges (PSD) (2025-2028)
  - Vice Mayor: Valdeci Meurer Silva (PL) (2025-2028)

Area
  - Total: 108.914 km^{2} (42.052 sq mi)
- Elevation: 8 m (26 ft)

Population (2022)
  - Total: 14,912
  - Density: 136.92/km^{2} (354.6/sq mi)
- Demonym: Barrassulense (Brazilian Portuguese)
- Time zone: UTC-03:00 (Brasília Time)
- Postal code: 89247-000
- HDI (2010): 0.716 – high
- Website: balneariobarradosul.atende.net

Balneário Barra do Sul is a city located in the north of the Brazilian state of Santa Catarina.

== General information ==
Despite having only 11,035 inhabitants circa 2020, it is one of the oldest communities of Santa Catarina, mostly by the influence of nearby São Francisco city, itself the third-oldest city in Brazil.

The main economical activities of the city are tourism, fishing, shrimp farming, agriculture (tree plantation for paper/wood), underground sand extraction, and one large chemical industry (magnesium extraction from sea water).

Tourism is fueled by very clean beaches and the sea estuary that is good for fishing and water sports. The city population increases to 50,000 or more at summer time (mostly from Christmas to the end of January).

The biggest city party (Festa da Tainha) happens by the winter, when the cold water brings huge schools of Tainha fish (a fish with meat rich in fat, suitable to grilling, vaguely similar to salmon but showing a white meat).

Most of the Barra do Sul natives have Portuguese/Indian heritage, and inherit from them the intimacy with the sea, the sea food cuisine and traditions like Farra do Boi—releasing a bull in the village and teasing it so it runs after people. Even though this tradition is also found in French and Spanish cities, Farra do Boi is forbidden by law in Brazil due to animal rights regulations, which resulted with the help of President Getúlio Vargas through Brazil's 1934 constitution, passed on 16 July. Based on the recognition of animals in the Constitution, a Brazilian Supreme Court ruling resulted in the ban of animal-related activities that involve claimed "animal suffering such as cock fighting, and a tradition practiced in southern Brazil, known as "Farra do Boi" (the Oxen Festival)". stating that "animals also have the right to legal protection against mistreatment and suffering".

Beginning in the 1960s, a small but steady immigration flux of people from nearby towns increased the ethnic diversity, and nowadays almost all ethnic communities found in Santa Catarina (in particular Germans) have a share in Barra do Sul. Following the immigration, Catholic church as well as major flavors of Protestantism have physical presence in Barra do Sul.

Also, migration from Rio Grande do Sul state brought a CTG (Gaucho traditions center) to Barra do Sul.

== History ==
The proximity with São Francisco do Sul town (itself the third oldest village in Brazil) made Barra do Sul a natural route for transportation, as well as an alternative São Francisco's port entrance coming from the south (hence the name, Barra do Sul means "South Shore").

The first three non-Indian inhabitants in the 18th century were from a small military patrol that helped travellers to cross the "river" (the sea estuary) and protected them from Indian attacks (save for the Carijós, all other tribes in the area tended to react violently to white man presence).

In a very slow pace, Portuguese immigrants or people with Portuguese descent began to colonize Barra do Sul, living from cassava planting, fishing and/or providing services for travellers en route to the bigger cities. In the beginning of the 20th century, extractivism of certain leaves from "mangues" (seawater swamps) for the leather industry was also important. Immigrants mixed with the pacific Carijó tribe and determined he ethnical mix found today.

For centuries, Barra do Sul had no terrestrial roads to other cities, relying on navigation and walking by the seashore. The main two roads were built well into the 20th century:

- The first one (Salinas) was open incidentally by a palm extractivism business - as the palms were cut, a small wooden railroad was built to collect the palms at site, leaving the road outlined when the palm reserves exhausted. That road was very primitive, allowing only animal traction vehicles. In the 1960s military engineering troops improved the road to the point it could (barely) be used by regular cars. Nowadays it is a gravel but perfectly usable road. There are plans to cover it with tarmac in the next 5–10 years.
- The second one (Conquista) became main access to the city, and was open around the 1950s by a private landowner that planned to sell his land in small chunks, and having a road would be a selling point. This road was covered with tarmac by the 1990s. It was also corrected to be more straight, so 8 km of the old gravel, sinuous road still exists and gives access to many rural properties.

== The blockage of the sea channel ==
The Baia da Babitonga sea estuary is delimited by the mainland at West and the São Francisco island at East. São Francisco port is in the estuary where the water is calm, and it could be reached both from South and North island extremes. In 1935, the estuary was landfilled 15 km upstream of the South sea entrance, in order to build a railroad over the estuary (it can be seen at 26°21′44″S 48°39′46″W).

This procedure made the estuary to be separated in two parts: North (where the port is) and South (where Barra do Sul is). Both have an exit to the sea but the crossflow of water was blocked. This crossflow was important because the North estuary has a mean sea level half meter above South estuary (the difference can easily be seen if the observer is over the landfill), so the landfill blocked the North-South flow that kept the estuary deep and clean.

That caused several obvious and non-obvious ecological and economical impacts. First, the South sea exit no longer could be used for navigation, since the landfill blocked the route to São Francisco port. Several fishing, extractivism and boat maneuvering workers lost their jobs.

Over time, the reduced sea tide and crossflow made the South estuary to become shallower, reducing fishing output and stagnating the water. The only small positive effect was to increase the dry area at Barra do Sul city; several blocks of city center are built on land that used to be submerged or swamped. The exit to the sea became to get clogged by sand, and the South estuary was in danger of becoming a closed saltwater lake.

In 1982, an emergencial action was taken in order to reopen the estuary for good: the exit was lined with big stones, as well as made straight, deeper and narrower. Since then, the strong sea tide currents have been able to keep the estuary open to the sea, improving a lot the whole channel's situation. It is now (2007) much more clean than it used to be, even though the shallowness problem persists, limiting the navigation.

There are proposals to re-open the landfill (either entirely or just a small gap to allow the current to flow), but it will be an expensive measure and there are concerns about the sea reclaiming back the city areas that were not dry before the landfill.
