= Attacks against homosexuals in São Paulo in 2010 =

Homophobic attacks in São Paulo, Brazil

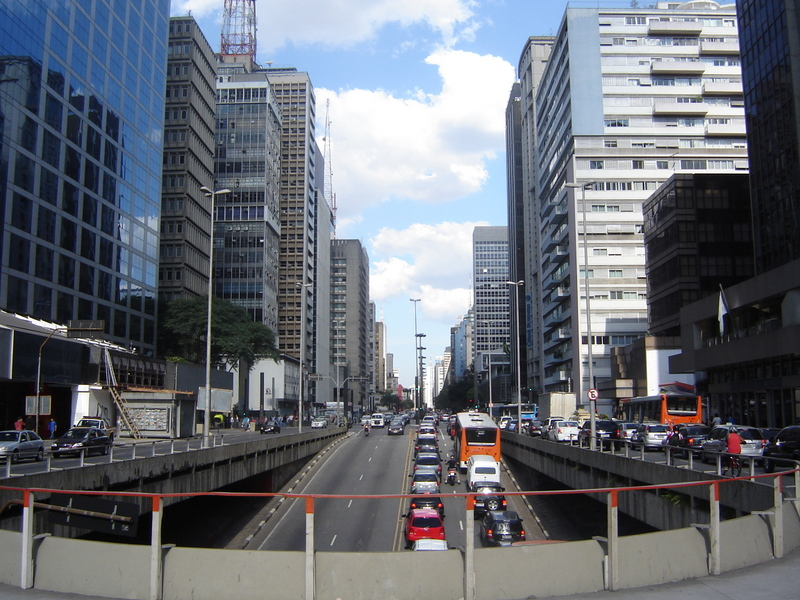
- Location: Avenida Paulista, São Paulo
- Date: November 14, 2010 6:30 a.m. (approximate)
- Attack type: Homophobic attack
- Weapon: 2 fluorescent bulbs
- Injuries: 2
- No. of participants: 2

The attacks against homosexuals in São Paulo in 2010 took place on November 14 on Paulista Avenue in São Paulo, when five young men—including four teenagers between the ages of 16 and 17—attacked three young gay men with fluorescent light bulbs.

== Assault ==
On 14 November 2010, in São Paulo, at around 6:30 a.m., Jonathan Lauton Domingues, 19, and four other teenagers, aged 16 to 17, attacked three young gay men on Paulista Avenue with two fluorescent light bulbs. According to witnesses, the attackers reportedly called the victims “you fags” and “you’re boyfriends” during the attacks, suggesting that the attacks may have been homophobic in nature.

== Consequences and Punishment ==
After the case garnered widespread national attention, particularly following the release of a video in which, for no apparent reason, one of the young assailants is seen smashing a fluorescent light tube over the head of one of the victims, the four minors were admitted to Fundação Casa (formerly Febem), where they have been since November 23. The boys could be sentenced to up to 3 years of detention at Fundação Casa.

Jonathan Lauton Domingues, the only adult in the group, was indicted on charges of attempted murder, causing extremely serious bodily injury, and conspiracy. On 20 October 2015, Jonathan was convicted of attempted murder with three aggravating circumstances due to a despicable motive, but he remains a fugitive.

The attacks sparked protests by various social and LGBTQ organizations against the defendants and homophobia. In recent months, at least six attacks in the Paulista Avenue area have been reported, with a total of 8 victims.

== See also ==
- Homophobia
- Discrimination against LGBTQ people in Brazil
- Internalized homophobia
- Prejudice
- Heterosexism
- Hate crime
- Homosexuality
