= TV Tibagi =

TV Tibagi (ZYQ 206)
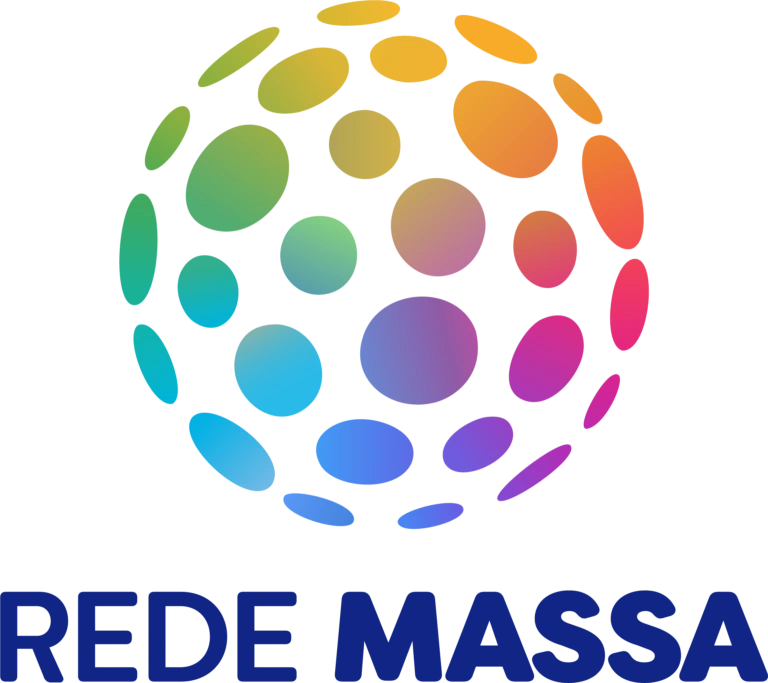
- Maringá/Apucarana, Paraná; Brazil
- Channels: Digital: 39 (UHF); Virtual: 11
- Branding: Rede Massa

Programming
- Affiliations: SBT

Ownership
- Owner: Rede Massa (Carlos Roberto Massa); (Rádio e Televisão Iguaçu S/A.)

History
- First air date: July 26, 1969
- Former call signs: ZYB 395 (1969-2018)
- Former channel numbers: Analog: 11 (VHF, 1969–2018)
- Former affiliations: REI (1969-1972); Rede Globo (1972-1976); Rede Tupi (1978-1980); TVS-Record (1980-1981)

Technical information
- Licensing authority: ANATEL
- ERP: 0.40 kW
- Transmitter coordinates: 25°27′44.4″S 49°15′29.9″W

Links
- Public license information: Profile
- Website: redemassa.com.br

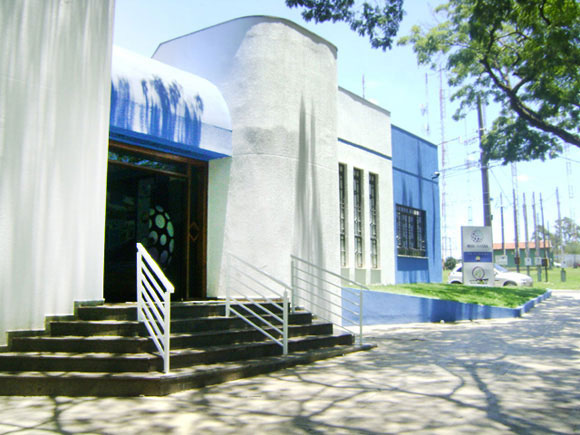
Tibagi TV Headquarters, Rede Massa

TV Tibagi is a Brazilian television station licensed and headquartered in Apucarana, with a branch in Maringá, both cities in the state of Paraná. It operates on channel 11 (39 UHF digital) and is affiliated with SBT. It is part of Rede Massa, a television network in Paraná belonging to Grupo Massa. In Apucarana, the broadcaster maintains its facilities in the Vila Shangri-la neighborhood, and in Maringá, its studios and transmitters are in the Praça Pio XII region, in Zone 05.

== History ==
TV Tibagi went on air in 1969, based in Apucarana, through VHF channel 11. The new station belonged to the then governor of Paraná, Paulo Pimentel, who had TV Iguaçu in Curitiba. The station became affiliated with Rede Tupi, bringing programming directly from Curitiba.

Starting in the 1970s, TV Tibagi, until then restricted to Apucarana and the region, became the main competitor of TV Coroados de Londrina, affiliated with Rede Globo: the broadcaster expanded repeaters in the cities of Londrina, Maringá and other cities in the north of Paraná. The expansion of repeaters was due to more investment, programming, and a signal with better distribution from Apucarana (known as the "upper city") than TV Coroados.

Retransmitters in cities further away from Apucarana began to retransmit TV Tibagi, reducing the coverage area of TV Coroados. There was generally equipment to retransmit only one channel on each repeater.

As a result, TV Tibagi was better than TV Coroados, taking it away from the audience, using the same repeater system carried out by TVs Coroados and Excelsior. Retransmitters in more distant cities began to retransmit TV Tibagi, reducing the coverage area of TV Coroados.

With the revocation and extinction of Tupi in 1980, the station joined the TVS-Record network for a year until the current SBT network was created.

In 2008, Paulo Pimentel sold the station to Carlos Massa, aka Ratinho.

== Technical information ==
Virtual channel	Digital channel	Aspect ratio	Content
11.1	39 UHF	1080i	TV Iguaçu/SBT's main programming
11.2	39 UHF	480i Widescreen	TV Escola Curitiba (no audio and video)

The station closed its analog signal on November 28, 2018, when the Maringá region did so.
