= Rio LGBTI Pride Parade =

Pride Parade in Brazil

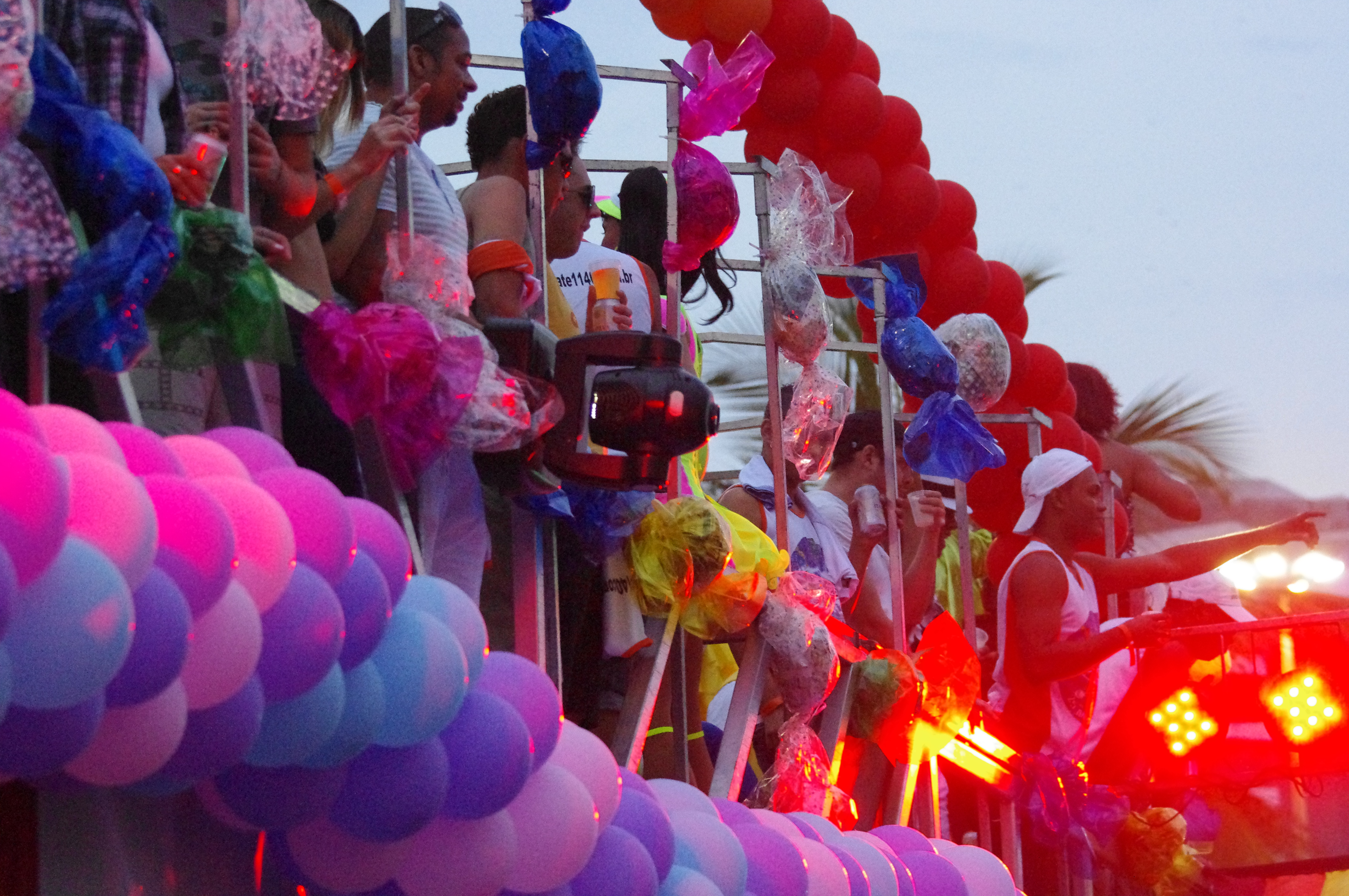
LGBT pride in Rio de Janeiro

The Rio LGBTI Pride Parade is an annual demonstration held in the Brazilian city of Rio de Janeiro, aiming to promote equal rights for gay men, lesbians, bisexuals, and transgender people, together with the straight allies who support them through activism. Over the years, it has turned into a festival that includes various parallel activities, such as exhibitions and concerts.

== History ==
The first attempts to hold an LGBT demonstration in Rio de Janeiro date back to 1993, when around 30 people walked along the Copacabana beach.

The first LGBT march in Rio de Janeiro was held on June 25, 1995, called the "March for Citizenship," on the occasion of the 17th Conference of the International Lesbian, Gay, Bisexual, Trans and Intersex Association (ILGA), held in the Brazilian city. On that occasion, around 3,000 people gathered under the organization of Grupo Arco-Íris, with the attendance of historic figures of the Brazilian LGBT movement such as Jane di Castro and the drag queen Isabelita dos Patins. A 124-meter-long LGBT flag was also displayed.

The LGBT march in Copacabana has been organized from the beginning by Grupo Arco-Íris, and has taken place on different dates each year: in 2019, the march was held on September 22, while in 2022 (after being suspended for 2 years due to the COVID-19 pandemic) it was held on November 27. The 2023 edition of the LGBT Pride March of Rio de Janeiro took place on September 24.
