= Programa do Ratinho =

- Genre: Variety show
- Created by: Carlos Massa; Celso Portiolli; Silvio Santos; Patrícia Abravanel; Sílvia Abravanel; Américo Ribeiro; Homero Salles; Roberto Manzoni; Eduardo de Oliveira Varela; Evandro de Porra Lima; José Edivaldo Barros; José Carlos de Oliveira Barros; João Luciano de Oliveira Costa; André Raimundo Pereira; André Milano; Kelly Guidotti; Hudson Vieira; Jumento Órfão; Fábio Lucindo; Mister Maker; Os Trapalhões; Renato Aragão; Dedé Santana; Mussum; Zacarias; Carlos Roberto Bem-Te-Vi; Ney Inácio; Carlos Alberto de Nóbrega; Romeu Paris; Carlos Amorim; Raimundo Varela
- Directed by: Walter Scaramuzzi; Lucimara Parisi
- Presented by: Ratinho
- Starring: Milene Pavorô; Xaropinho; Rhenata Schmidt; Santos; Marquito; Faxinildo; Pegador
- Narrated by: O Sombra
- Opening theme: "Clowning Around" by Bill Cantos (1998–2000)
- Country of origin: Brazil
- Original language: Portuguese

Production
- Running time: 60–90 minutes

Original release
- Network: SBT
- Release: 8 September 1998 – present

Related
- 190 Urgente; Show do Ratinho; Você é o Jurado

Programa do Ratinho is a Brazilian television program displayed by SBT, presented by Ratinho (Carlos Roberto Massa), and first aired from September 8, 1998 with popular content, music, information, interviews, jokes, humor, fun, the main news from Brazil and the world and its people's participation. After its exhibition closed in 2006, and May 5, 2009, the program returned to the program schedule until today.

It airs Monday through Friday at 10:15 p.m. (Brasília time).

== History ==
=== Background ===
The first version of Programa do Ratinho was produced by Rede OM in 1992, when Ratinho was employed by the network and worked as a reporter for the news program Cadeia, hosted by Luiz Carlos Alborghetti. The show aired daily and included musical performances, news reports, interviews, and citizen complaints. The set was styled as a bar located within the network’s studio in Curitiba. It went off the air in the same year after Ratinho returned to police journalism. He later replaced Alborghetti as the host of Cadeia (by then already under the CNT network, after Rede OM's rebranding), which was eventually renamed 190 Urgente.

Rumors of Ratinho’s move to SBT were widely circulated in the television press. When his contract with CNT ended in 1997, one of the offers he received was from SBT. At that time, Silvio Santos intended to cast him as the host of a talent show. However, due to Record TV’s offer of profit-sharing from the 0900 call-in services, Ratinho signed with Record. From then on, SBT continued to make several proposals, prompting Record to raise his salary to retain him.

In an interview with IstoÉ magazine in May 1998, Ratinho acknowledged that his salary was low and that Silvio Santos had offered him ten times what he was earning at the Barra Funda network.

At the beginning of 1998, Silvio Santos attempted to hire the presenter but was persuaded not to proceed, partly to avoid worsening the financial crisis the network was facing. There were also concerns that a new program led by Ratinho might not yield sufficient audience ratings or advertising revenue. Silvio's position began to shift with Moacyr Franco’s rise to the role of creative director, becoming Silvio’s right-hand man. During a visit to Domingo Legal, Ratinho initiated a new and decisive round of negotiations, with host Gugu Liberato acting as intermediary.

=== Turning Point ===
The premiere performance of Ratinho Livre on a Saturday—having previously aired from Monday to Friday—on August 22, 1998, displaced the comedy show A Praça é Nossa from its leading ratings position to third place (14 to 11 points). This outcome was crucial in Silvio Santos’s decision to hire Ratinho permanently.

The following week began with the announcement that SBT was struggling to secure new advertising contracts. Programs such as Fantasia were expected to be canceled, and more layoffs were anticipated. Some executives entered into open conflict with Moacyr Franco due to differences of opinion.

On August 26, Luciano Callegari and Guilherme Stoliar—both opposed to Ratinho’s hiring—resigned from SBT. Silvio Santos, however, decided to keep them at the network, though removed from any leadership roles. At that point, SBT was on the verge of collapse. On the same day, at Record TV, Ratinho failed to appear to host Ratinho Livre, forcing the network to air a rerun.

On the night of August 27, in what was either a masterstroke or a desperate move, Silvio Santos signed a contract with Ratinho and subsequently announced the presenter’s hiring live on SBT. That same night, for the second day in a row, Ratinho did not show up to host the program at Record.

On August 28, Agência JB reported that, in addition to hiring Ratinho, SBT was expected to pay R$43 million in contract termination fees to Record. That same day, SBT aired commercials promoting a special program to be broadcast on Friday—initially the slot for Tela de Sucessos—as well as a press conference, which scored 13 audience points. Record once again aired a rerun of Ratinho Livre, and during commercial breaks, it aired a right of reply confirming Ratinho’s departure and announcing a new show, Leão Livre, hosted by Gilberto Barros, starting on August 31.

== Lawsuits ==
On August 30, 2011, Ratinho and SBT were ordered to pay R$ 150,000 in damages for moral harm to Pastor Victor Ricardo Soto Orellana, founder of the LGBTQ-inclusive church Acalanto – Ministério Outras Ovelhas, after Ratinho called the church a "church of faggots." After losing in court and appealing, the case against Ratinho and SBT reached the Superior Court of Justice, which upheld the conviction determined in the lower court.
