= Jandaia do Sul =

Coordinates: 23°36′S 51°39′W

- Municipality
- Flag Coat of arms
- Interactive map of Jandaia do Sul
- Country: Brazil
- State: Paraná
- Metropolitan region: Maringá
- Founded: December 14, 1952

Government
  - Mayor: Lauro De Souza Silva Junior

Area
  - Total: 187.6 km^{2} (72.4 sq mi)
- Elevation: 807 m (2,648 ft)

Population (2018)
  - Total: 21,122
  - Density: 112.6/km^{2} (291.6/sq mi)
- Demonym: jandaiense
- Time zone: UTC-3 (Brasília Time)

Jandaia do Sul is a municipality in the state of Paraná in Brazil. As of 2020, the estimated population was 21,230.
