= Ratinho (TV presenter) =

Brazilian television presenter (born 1956)

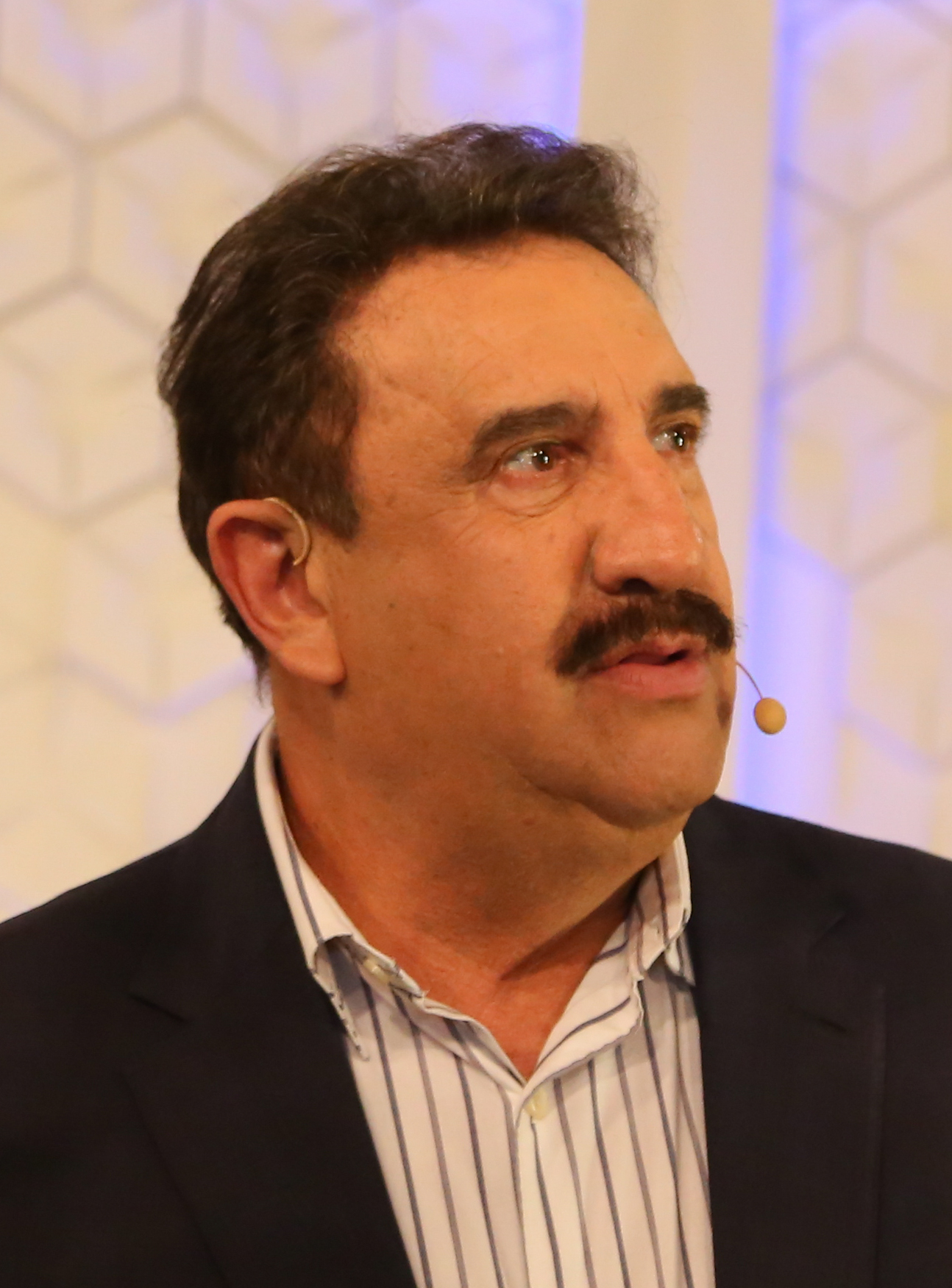
- Ratinho in 2022

Federal Deputy
- In office 1 February 1991 – 31 January 1995
- Constituency: Paraná

Curitiba Municipal Councillor
- In office 1 January 1989 – 31 December 1991

Jandaia do Sul Municipal Councillor
- In office 1 January 1977 – 31 December 1988

Personal details
- Born: Carlos Roberto Massa; 15 February 1956 (age 70) Águas de Lindóia, São Paulo, Brazil
- Party: National Reconstruction Party (1990–1995)
- Children: Ratinho Júnior
- Occupation: television host; politician; businessman

Carlos Roberto Massa (born 15 February 1956), better known as Ratinho, is a Brazilian television presenter, businessman, comedian, radio personality, and politician. He is the father of the Governor of the State of Paraná, Ratinho Júnior, and is known as a personality on SBT—having hosted the talk show Programa do Ratinho since 1998.

== Biography ==
Ratinho was a politician from the late 1970s until the mid-1990s, where he was the Vereador of Curitiba and then Federal Deputy for Paraná where he ran for the Partido da Reconstrução Nacional party. He is the founder and owner of Grupo Massa, which operates in communications, agribusiness, management and brand licensing.

Ratinho began his television career in 1991 as a police reporter on Rede OM. In 1997, he debuted a program called Ratinho Livre. In 1998 he transferred to SBT and hosted the show Programa do Ratinho, which ran until 2006. The show returned in 2009 and he returned to host.

== Personal life ==
Ratinho's son, Ratinho Júnior is the current governor of the state of Paraná, having won the 2018 election. He is a supporter of the Brazilian football club Palmeiras. He is a staunch supporter of Jair Bolsonaro.

== Legal disputes ==
=== HSBC Case ===
Ratinho, owner of Rede Massa, an SBT affiliate in Paraná, and his wife, Solange Martinez Massa, had an active account at HSBC between 2006 and 2007 with a balance of US$12.5 million. Rede Massa stated that "all assets and values were duly declared."

=== Mistreatment of rural workers ===
In July 2016, Carlos Massa was convicted by the Superior Labor Court (TST) for keeping workers in precarious conditions on a rural property he owned, including poor working conditions and irregular hiring using intermediaries. The Labor Prosecutor's Office initially suggested in a statement that it was a situation analogous to slavery, but later issued another statement excluding the term. The conviction, after dispute in lower courts, included compensation of R$ 200,000 for collective moral damages to the farm employees in Limeira do Oeste, for non-compliance with labor standards relating to occupational health and safety, such as the absence of protective equipment, lack of adequate places for meals, non-compliance with the intra-day break, and hiring through intermediaries.

=== Humiliating exposure of a family ===
On 22 February 2020, the Superior Court of Justice (STJ) ordered the presenter to pay R$ 150,000 in damages to a family exposed on his television program. On that occasion, the presenter's reporter wanted to question resident Rogério Gonçalves about the sale of a raffle ticket involved in an alleged fraud. To conduct the interview, he forced his way onto Rogério's property, where only his 14-year-old daughter, in her pajamas, her boyfriend, and a 2-year-old child were present. According to the STJ's understanding, the presenter "encouraged the public embarrassment imposed on the family."

=== Transphobia against Erika Hilton ===
In March 2026, he was accused of transphobia by federal deputy Erika Hilton, who filed a criminal lawsuit against Ratinho, seeking 10 million reais, after he stated on his SBT program that "she is not a woman, she is trans." The statement was made by Ratinho when commenting on Hilton's election to the presidency of the Women's Rights Defense Commission of the Chamber of Deputies. "I will always be a woman," and he, "rat," Erika stated. Ratinho defended himself on social media: "A lot of controversy, right? I defend the trans population, but I also defend the right of those who govern. Political criticism, people, is not prejudice, it's journalism and I'm not going to stay silent."

Based on Hilton's complaint, the Federal Public Prosecutor's Office filed a lawsuit. In parallel, the Ministry of Communications initiated an investigation against SBT regarding the episode.

On June 17, the 2nd Civil Court of the São Paulo Court of Justice granted Hilton the right of reply regarding statements made by Ratinho, ruling that SBT must air a video of her criticizing those statements during his program, subject to a fine of 50,000 reais.

On September 1, during the Papagaio Falante podcast, Ratinho criticized Hilton, stating: "They take advantage of my popularity and start badmouthing me. That young man. He started treating me poorly, and I never retorted. I never spoke ill of him—not even back then. I simply gave my opinion as a citizen." He also stated that the Women's Rights Defense Commission should be chaired by a "woman who has a uterus." On September 3, Hilton filed another lawsuit against him, involving the São Paulo Public Prosecutor's Office.

In September 2026, the São Paulo Court of Justice denied SBT's appeal and ruled that the channel must broadcast Hilton's right of reply before the 2026 Brazilian elections.
