= TV Iguaçu =

TV Iguaçu (ZYQ 217)
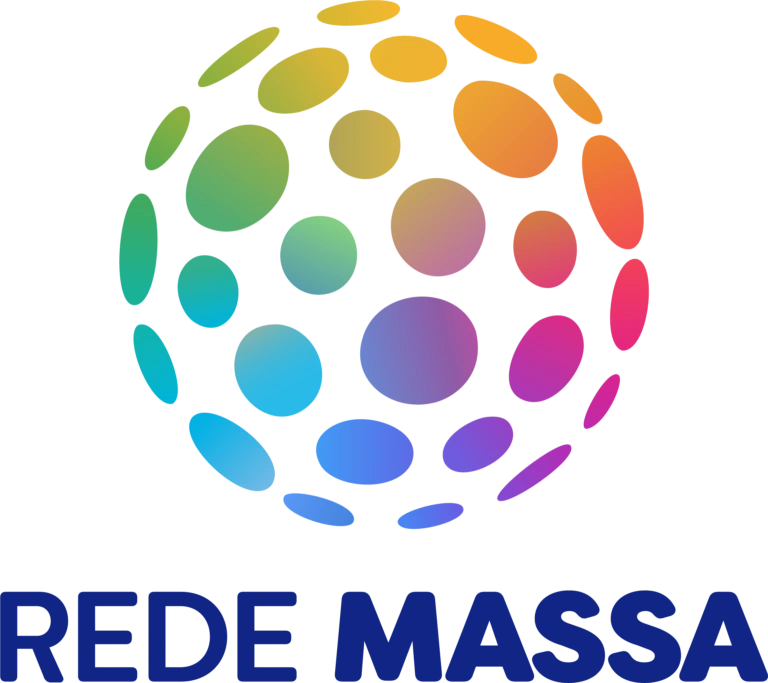
- Curitiba, Paraná; Brazil
- Channels: Digital: 39 (UHF); Virtual: 4
- Branding: Rede Massa

Programming
- Affiliations: SBT

Ownership
- Owner: Rede Massa (Carlos Roberto Massa); (Rádio e Televisão Iguaçu S/A.)

History
- First air date: December 27, 1967
- Former call signs: ZYB 393 (1967–2018)
- Former channel numbers: Analog: 4 (VHF, 1967–2018)
- Former affiliations: Rede Globo (1967–1976); Rede Tupi (1978–1980); TVS-Record (1980–1981)

Technical information
- Licensing authority: ANATEL
- ERP: 10 kW
- Transmitter coordinates: 25°27′44.4″S 49°15′29.9″W

Links
- Public license information: Profile
- Website: redemassa.com.br

TV Iguaçu (channel 4) is a Brazilian television station based in Curitiba, capital of the state of Paraná serving as an affiliate of the SBT for the capital area and its surrounding areas. It is the flagship station of Rede Massa, a regional television network owned by Grupo Massa, which broadcasts to four more stations in the state. Its studios are located in the Parolin neighborhood, and its transmitters are in the TV Bandeirantes Paraná tower, in the Pilarzinho neighborhood.

== History ==
TV Iguaçu was inaugurated on December 27, 1967, by the then governor of the State, Paulo Pimentel, owner of a group of the same name that also owned newspapers and radio stations. Its headquarters, like the first headquarters of TV Paraná, was designed specifically to house it, and had three studios and an auditorium. Much of its physical structure remained unchanged for years, and, at the time of its inauguration, it had the best equipment available at the time, using Marconi transmitters and recording its productions on Ampex videotapes.

From the beginning of its operations until 1972, TV Iguaçu's programming consisted of a mix of its own programs, such as the news program Show de Jornal (a landmark achievement at the time), and TV Record programs that came from São Paulo in the form of videotapes, as the region did not receive microwave connections yet. TV Tibagi, the first inland station, opened two years later, over time, Pimentel's two television stations in the state grew in ratings.

Between 1972 and 1976, TV Iguaçu was affiliated with Rede Globo, but due to pressure exerted by authorities linked to the military government of the then President of the Republic at the time, General Ernesto Geisel, who were against the political rise of Paulo Pimentel, the termination of the contract with Rede Globo. Since then, TV Paranaense, which since the beginning of the 1970s had been controlled by a group of businessmen led by Francisco Cunha Pereira Filho, started to retransmit the signal from the Rio station, and TV Iguaçu, after two years with independent programming, it became an affiliate of Rede Tupi, which was in the midst of a deep financial crisis, culminating in its bankruptcy in 1980.

In 1975, Pimentel tried to sell his stations to the Bandeirantes group, owner of Rede Bandeirantes, which was starting to increase its presence. The sale wasn't finalized.

In 1981, TV Iguaçu became one of the first affiliates of the Brazilian Television System, thanks to the indirect intervention of Ney Braga. With his stations affiliated to SBT, his businesses in the media sector became stable again.

To this day, it continues to retransmit the signal from Silvio Santos' network, together with TV Cidade de Londrina, TV Tibagi de Apucarana and TV Naipi de Foz do Iguaçu. On March 17, 2008, the group's four stations were sold to presenter Carlos Massa, who then formed Rede Massa.

In August 2021, Rede Massa acquired a 3000 m^{2} warehouse located in the Parolin neighborhood, which had belonged to Soft Cine Produções, and installed the studios of TV Iguaçu there, while leaving its old headquarters in the Mercês neighborhood after 53 years. The new structure was officially opened on December 13, along with the network's new programming.

== Technical information ==
Virtual channel	Digital channel	Aspect ratio	Content
4.1	39 UHF	1080i	TV Iguaçu/SBT's main programming
4.2	39 UHF	480i Widescreen	TV Escola Curitiba (no audio and video)

The station began its digital transmissions on January 30, 2013, through UHF channel 39. Previously, the station's signal in this format could only be received by NET channel 504 in Curitiba, which went on air on August 2, 2011. On October 27, 2014, all of the station's programming began to be shown in high definition, and before its extinction, Melhores da Massa had programs recorded in the format between 2013 and 2014.
