= Rádio Televisão do Brasil =

Rádio Televisão do Brasil was the first television station licensed in Brazil. Founded in 1949 by César Ladeira, it was based in Rio de Janeiro and already received an equipment order from RCA. Numerous impasses led to RTB ultimately never launching.

== History ==
On 24 June 1948, eleven months before TV Tupi received its first equipment orders for São Paulo and Rio de Janeiro, and three months before the first television test transmissions in Rio de Janeiro by the government radio network Rádio Nacional, César Ladeira, a famous speaker from 1930s radio, begins work to form what would become Rádio Televisão do Brasil S/A. He had previously taken part in trips abroad regarding the development of television, in New York in 1939, and again in 1946 in Mexico City, at the first Interamerican Broadcasting Congress. Just a few weeks prior to its creation, it released (on June 7) an advertisement in the local press calling for shares. Whoever got the shares would also become one of the first to receive a television set, manufactured either in the United States or the United Kingdom.

The company was formally founded on 19 February 1949, upon associating with aviation businessman José Sampaio Freire. That same month, it received an equipment order from RCA, a 5-kilowatt transmitter, using FCC characteristics. As of December, share offers quickly ran out; the company also planned to import a thousand television sets.

On 24 February 1950, Minister for Roads and Public Transports Clóvis Pestana dispatched an authorization to broadcast the station on VHF channel 2. Two locations were considered for the transmitter, at Sugarloaf Mountain and Urca, and invited British, French and American technicians to study an adequate location. Its studios were expected to be located at Vieira Bueno Street, in the São Cristóvão neighborhood. Around that time, RTB did not yet proceed with its projects, at a time when the two Tupi stations already got their equipments – also acquired from GE/RCA – whereas RTB had a license, but still lacked the equipment. In April, it announced the cancellation of its agreement with GE for the exclusive distribution of its television sets into Brazilian territory; Sampaio Freire had previously negotiated (in December 1949) with British company Pye to manufacture the Brasil models specifically for the Brazilian market, due early 1950. Pye Television's director J. B. Edwards visited Rio de Janeiro for this purpose.

Over time, other impasses happened that led to the gradual dissolution of the project. On 22 February 1952, president Getúlio Vargas decided to revoke its license. Reports emerged on the local press that César Ladeira's company was operating without transparency and local authorities sketched a plan to question him. Domingos Ferreira believed that the company was fraudulent and Finally, on 18 December 1954, Sampaio Freire issued an announcement regarding the company's difficulties in importing equipment, a situation that worsened after a change to the exchange rate which meant that all negotiations had to be done through Banco do Brasil. All shareholders unanimously decided to vote in favor of the dissolution. Moreover, all television sets sold in Rio were pre-tuned to channel 6, used by Tupi, and not channel 2, which was intended to be used by Rádio Mayrink Veiga (whose plan for a TV license was also halted) or RTB.

The VHF frequency would only be activated in 1963, for TV Excelsior's owned-and-operated station, which it used until 1970 when its license was revoked; then from 1975 by TVE Brasil, which in 2007 was replaced by EBC's TV Brasil.
