= TV Altamira =

Altamira, Pará; Brazil
- Channels: Analog: 6; Digital: 42 (to be implemented)
- Branding: TV Altamira

Programming
- Affiliations: Rede Brasil

Ownership
- Owner: Prefeitura Municipal de Altamira; (FUNTAL - Fundação de Telecomunicações de Altamira)

History
- Founded: January 17, 1977
- First air date: January 17, 1977
- Former affiliations: Rede Tupi (1977-1980); Rede Globo (1980-1993); Rede Bandeirantes (1993-1997); CNT (1997-1998); Rede Manchete (1998-1999); RedeTV! (1999); Rede Record (1999-2010); TV Gazeta (2010-2013); Rede Cultura do Pará (2013-2022)

TV Altamira, also known as TVA, is a Brazilian television station located in the city of Altamira, Pará. The station is affiliated with Rede Brasil and is tuned to Channel 6 VHF.

The broadcaster has an RTV Station Operating License under number 002174/2002-SCM issued by ANATEL on January 11, 2002, and valid until November 30, 2015.

== History ==
In September 1976, the Ministry of Communications published in the Official Gazette of the Union (DOU) the ordinance of the Basic Plan for the distribution of 112 channels in UHF for the 51 cities of Pará (average of 2 Channels in each city), through the National Department of Telecommunications (DENTEL), among them, was Altamira. This coincided with the start of TV Marabá, the first television station in inland Pará, which had a The station was a Tupi affiliate and received its programming from TABA jets that were sent from TV Marajoara to TV Altamira's facilities. With the cessation of Rede Tupi in 1980, the station resorted to affiliate with the TVS-Record stop-gap.

TV Altamira received its definitive license in March 1983 and, by then, had become an affiliate of TV Globo through TV Liberal Belém. During the Globo affiliation, the station covered the "Monster of Altamira", a child molester. After the launch of TV Transamazônica, the current TV Liberal Altamira, the station affiliated with Rede Bandeirantes. In the 90s, the station played the municipal anthem at sign-on.

In late January 2019, Observatório da Imprensa visited its current facilities, operating in a precarious state. The local news program TVA Notícias has been out of production since a thunderstorm in December 2018, burning its transmitter; and in February 2019, Erik Matos, station administrator, bought a new transmitter borrowed by a local technician. The news team consisted of two reporters, two cameramen and one producer.
