= 1961 in Brazilian television =

This is a list of two Brazilian television-related births from 1961.

== Events ==
- 16 July – The program Mosaico na TV airs on the TV Excelsior in São Paulo, being still the longest-running program on Brazilian television.

== Shows ==
- Sítio do Pica-pau Amarelo (1952–1963)

== Networks and services ==
=== Launches ===
Network	Type	Launch date	Notes	Source
TV Rádio Clube Goiás	Terrestrial	7 September		
TV Vitória	Terrestrial	8 September		
TV Marajoara	Terrestrial	30 September		

== Births ==
- 2 September - Oscar Magrini, actor
- 19 September - Bia Seidl, actress

== See also ==
- 1961 in Brazil
