= Rádio Clube (Fortaleza) =

Rádio Clube (ZYH 585)
Fortaleza, Ceará; Brazil
- Frequency: 1200 kHz

Programming
- Language: Portuguese
- Format: Full-service; Sports
- Affiliations: Super Rádio Tupi

Ownership
- Owner: Ceará Rádio Clube S/A
- Operator: Diários Associados

History
- Founded: August 28, 1931
- Former call signs: PRE 9 ZYN 6 ZYN 7
- Former names: PRAT; PRE-9; Ceará Rádio Clube; Rádio Planalto Fortaleza

Technical information
- Licensing authority: ANATEL
- Class: B
- Power: 10 kW

Links
- Public license information: Profile
- Website: radioclube1200.com.br

Rádio Clube (ZYH 585) is a radio station licensed to Fortaleza, Ceará, serving the respective metropolitan area. It is part of the Diários Associados media conglomerate and was designed and inaugurated in the 1930s by Lebanese businessman João Dummar. The station is the first and oldest operating radio station in Ceará.

== History ==
Interested in the radio-telephony activities of the time, Lebanese businessman João Demétrio Dummar launched the Ceará Radio Clube on August 28, 1931, a civil society formed by personalities who were also interested in the subject. This society included Francisco Aprígio Riquet Nogueira, Clóvis Fontenele, Joaquim da Silveira Marinho, Eusébio Nery Alves de Sousa, Francisco Campello de Alencar Mattos, Diogo Vital de Siqueira, Álvaro de Azevedo e Sá, Sebastião Coelho Filho, César Herbster Dias, Jorge Ottoch, among others. The creation of the society was the starting point for the foundation of the first radio station in Ceará.

On August 16, 1932, the company obtained a license to broadcast under the call sign PRAT on the AM frequency 1320 kHz, later 1200 kHz. As a result, the station was installed, precariously, on September 19, 1933, awaiting only official licensing. On May 30, 1934, Ceará Rádio Clube's license was granted through ordinance 415. Using the name PRE-9, the initial transmitter had a power of 500 watts. The headquarters and initial studios were located on Rua Barão do Rio Branco, with the transmitter operating in the Damas neighborhood, located on Avenida João Pessoa, occupying an area that was next to the former Ideal Clube facilities. The radio station moved to this location in 1938. The radio studio had two pianos, a French grand and a nationally manufactured cabinet piano.

There are no precise records of PRE-9's first programs. Archives from the early years reveal that the programming was exclusively musical and that revelations of the time, such as José Pompeu Gomes de Matos, Lauro Maia, José and Estevão Emílio de Castro and Aloysio Pinto, played the piano on the broadcasts. The radio also made room for singers Vicente Celestino, Silvio Vieira, Augusto Calheiros, Alberto Perroni, Gastão Fomenti, Pixinguinha, Benedito Lacerda, as well as Carmem Miranda and Aurora Miranda. In 1936, the station held its first contest for announcers. The first generation of announcers was made up of Caetano Vasconcelos, José Júlio Cavalcante, José Cabral de Araújo, Raimundo Menezes, José Lima Verde Sobrinho, Luzanira Cabral, Silva Filho, among others. On December 24, 1939, it broadcast the first soccer match on radio in Ceará, valid for the Campeonato Cearense.

On August 29, 1941, PRE-9 received permission to move its studios from the Damas neighborhood to the Diogo Building, in the center of the capital. The inauguration of the new facilities and shortwave broadcasting took place on October 12, 1941 and included a huge party with singer Orlando Silva as the main attraction. The new phase of the station's programming was directed by Dermival Costa Lima, who brought the model of radio stations from the southern region of the country.At that time, the first auditorium programs were introduced.

In 1944, under pressure from Assis Chateubriand, the radio station was sold. According to João Dummar Filho, Ceará Rádio Clube was the target of rumors that led to its sale to Diários Associados. Before the sale went through, João Dummar circulated Chateubriand's check around Praça do Ferreira, showing his displeasure, as he believed the check was worthless compared to the work done by PRE-9. The station would have been bought for two thousand contos de réis.

The station became part of the Diários Associados on January 11, 1944. Dermival Costa Lima left as artistic director and was replaced by Antônio Maria de Araújo, who continued his work of establishing a high standard of quality on the radio. The then Ceará Rádio Clube launched its first radio drama contest, with the theme "The great processes of history", and the winner was Processo de Maria Antonieta, by journalist Eduardo Campos, who would join the station on September 4, 1944. He ended up becoming an announcer, using the pseudonym Manuelito Eduardo. The radio station continued to invest in radio drama and launched its own, Penumbra, by Amaral Gurgel, to great acclaim.

In 1948, he held his first solidarity campaign for the Santa Casa de Misericórdia, which was about to close its doors due to debts amounting to 200,000 cruzeiros. In 15 days, the campaign raised one million two hundred thousand cruzeiros. Speakers Paulo Cabral de Araújo, who was also the general director, and Luciano Carneiro played an important role in the campaign. Due to the success of the campaign, Paulo Cabral was nominated for the 1950 municipal elections. In October 1946, Ceará Rádio Clube broadcast special programming for its anniversary celebrations. On May 13, 1949, Ceará Rádio Clube inaugurated its new facilities in the Edifício Pajeú, with three studios, including a stage-auditorium with capacity for 500 people. The inauguration brought together important names such as the judge Faustino de Albuquerque e Souza, the governor of Ceará, D. Antônio de Almeida Lustosa, the Archbishop of Fortaleza, Dom João Daudt d'Oliveira, among others. At that time, the radio station had a program that announced in Portuguese, French, English, Spanish and Swedish.

From the 1950s onwards, competition for radio audiences began, due to the consolidation of Rádio Iracema, launched in 1948. At this time, the big shows were held in the auditorium of the Edifício Pajeú, as well as important artistic contracts, with high values, financed by the clubs of the time. With the creation of the first TV in Fortaleza, TV Ceará, in the 1960s, there were significant changes in the station's programming, which began to invest in popular and journalistic programs. This programming model lasted for a long time in the years that followed.The radio station's studios moved next door to TV Ceará, on Avenida Antônio Sales, and later moved to Rua Oswaldo Cruz. In June 1980, the representatives of Diários Associados in Ceará went into crisis and were forced to close down newspapers, TV Ceará (which had been shut down along with Rede Tupi), and to end the radio station's shortwave broadcasts. The station was now based on Avenida Senador Virgílio Tavora.

On July 16, 2008, it became part of Rede Clube Brasil and adopted the "Rádio Clube" brand. In 2011, the network began to show signs of decline and Rádio Clube started renting out programming slots. The radio network lasted until the head of the network, Rádio Clube de Brasília, was shut down on January 2, 2012. Since then, it has aired independent programming, with journalistic, popular and sports programs, absorbing the brand acquired from broadcasting as an affiliate. In 2014, it applied to the Ministry of Communications to migrate to the FM dial. The station was one of the few D.A. companies in the Northeast that was not acquired by Sistema Opinião de Comunicação, owned by the Hapvida Group. In 2015, it was reported that Rádio Clube would cease to exist to make room for Rádio Globo's programming, which did not materialize.

In September 2016, Rádio Clube laid off all its announcers and suspended its normal programming, switching to broadcasting musical selections. According to the Abidoral column in the newspaper O Povo, the station was going to rebroadcast the programming of Clube FM in Brasília, owned by the same group, without giving a date. Retransmission officially began on March 1, 2017, lasting until November 11, 2017, when it began repeating programming from Rádio Planalto, also from Brasília and owned by Diários Associados, and was then identified as Rádio Planalto Fortaleza. In January 2018, it switched from Planalto to Super Rádio Tupi, from Rio de Janeiro, also owned by the same group, and was once again identified as Rádio Clube. In April, the station went off the air.

On August 2, 2018, a meeting was held at the headquarters of Correio Braziliense in Brasília, where the return of Rádio Clube was agreed. In attendance were Guilherme Machado, vice-president of Diários Associados, the group's owners Robson Dias and Leornado Moisés, and broadcaster and artistic entrepreneur Márcio Aurélio, who will now be in charge of the station. The station will only return to the air on March 20, 2019, in a test phase, only playing music. On April 6, a special program presented by Márcio Aurélio was broadcast, covering the return of the station in more detail. On April 8, the radio station will officially start broadcasting its new programming, as well as rebroadcasting the programming of Super Rádio Tupi. On August 3, 2019, in celebration of Rádio Clube's anniversary, announcer José Carlos Araújo, from Super Rádio Tupi's sports team, was invited to narrate the Clássico-Rei between Ceará and Fortaleza in the Campeonato Brasileiro Série A. In November, construction began on its video studio for live broadcasts of programs for digital platforms, which opened in January 2020.

== Bibliography ==
- Sá, Adísia (2013). AM do Povo: a trajetória de uma pioneira (1982-2012). Fortaleza, Ceará: Edições Demócrito Rocha. ISBN 9788575295649.
