= TV Borborema =

TV Borborema (ZYQ 802)
- Campina Grande, Paraíba; Brazil
- Channels: Digital: 35 (UHF); Virtual: 8
- Branding: TV Borborema

Programming
- Affiliations: SBT

Ownership
- Owner: Grupo Norte de Comunicação; (Televisão Borborema S/A)
- Sister stations: Transamérica Aracaju; NovaBrasil FM Aracaju; Cidade 99 FM

History
- Founded: September 15, 1963
- First air date: March 14, 1966
- Former call signs: ZYB 275 (1966-2018)
- Former channel numbers: Analog: 3 (1963-1966; test signals); 9 (VHF, 1966–2018)
- Former affiliations: Rede Tupi (1963-1980); TVS-Record (1980); Rede Globo (1980-1986); Rede Manchete (1987-1989)

Technical information
- Licensing authority: ANATEL
- ERP: 1.4 kW
- Transmitter coordinates: 7°13′2.1″S 35°53′6.8″W

Links
- Public license information: Profile
- Website: www.tvborborema.tv.br

TV Borborema (channel 8) is a Brazilian television station based in Campina Grande, Paraíba. serving as an affiliate of the SBT television network. It was founded in 1966, being the first television station in the state, and is owned-and-operated by the Fortaleza, Ceará-based Sistema Opinião de Comunicação. Its studios are in the João Rique Building, in the city center, and its transmitter tower is at the top of the building.

== History ==
Campina Grande was the first city in Paraíba and in the interior of a state in the Northeast to have a television station, unlike other northeastern states, in which the first stations were installed in the capitals. João Pessoa would only have a local station in 1986. TV Borborema was one of the first broadcasters in the North/Northeast. Before, in 1960, TV Itapoan, in Salvador, Bahia, and TV Jornal do Commercio and TV Rádio Clube de Pernambuco in Recife, had already been opened.

According to historical accounts, Assis Chateaubriand ordered the inauguration of a TV in Campina Grande in 1961. The city was one of the main places for Diários Associados in the Northeast. There are records that Rádio Borborema at the time had enviable revenue, to the point of supporting the Clube de Pernambuco and Tamandaré radio stations, both installed in Recife, capital of Pernambuco.

TV Borborema entered its experimental phase on September 15, 1963, when it produced its first programs. The associated station was officially opened on March 14, 1966.

The station was part of Rede Tupi until July 18, 1980, when the network shut down, but its license was not revoked due to the broadcaster being financially healthy at the time, and due to political alignments, which allowed the broadcaster to remain in the air and later, install repeaters in the interior of Paraíba. For a short period, it began broadcasting content from TV Record and TVS Rio de Janeiro, where the remaining Tupi affiliates were housed. Then, on September 8, it joined Rede Globo, remaining with the network until December 31, 1986, when TV Paraíba went on air. On January 1, 1987, it became an affiliate of Rede Manchete. In 1989, he switched from Rede Manchete to SBT, where it remains today.

On January 16, 2015, the broadcaster had 57.5% of its shares sold by Diários Associados to Sistema Opinião de Comunicação, owned by Cândido Pinheiro, and who also owned part of the shares in TV Ponta Negra and TV Ponta Verde. The sale was approved by CADE on January 19, through a note published in the Official Gazette of the Union. In 2019, the Opinião Comunicação System started to hold 100% of the shares.

On March 14, 2016, the date on which the station celebrated its 50th anniversary, TV Borborema renewed its programming, with the debut of new scenarios and new programs, as well as a new graphics package. A solemn session was also held at the Municipal Chamber of Campina Grande, where the Medal of Honor for Municipal Merit was awarded to the broadcaster, for 50 years of services provided, and the title of citizen of Campina Grande to the president of the Sistema Opinião de Comunicação, Cândido Pinheiro Júnior.

In November 2016, the station debuted the local version of the program Tudo De Bom, present for 8 years in Natal on TV Ponta Negra and for 2 years in Maceió on TV Ponta Verde.

== Technical information ==
Virtual channel	Digital channel	Screen	Content
9.1	30 UHF	1080i	TV Borborema/SBT's main schedule

The station began its digital transmissions on an experimental basis on March 9, 2016, on UHF channel 30 in Campina Grande and nearby areas, and on March 14, date of the station's 50th anniversary, the digital signal was officially launched. On August 7, 2020, it began showing the network's programming in high definition for the first time since the signal went on air, but its local programs continue to be in SD.
