= TV Marabá =

Marabá, Pará; Brazil
- Channels: Analog: 13
- Branding: TV Marabá

Programming
- Affiliations: Boas Novas

Ownership
- Owner: Prefeitura Municipal de Marabá and merchants of Marabá.

History
- Founded: November 9, 1976
- First air date: November 9, 1976
- Last air date: January 9, 2019
- Former channel numbers: Analog: 13 (VHF, 1976–2019)
- Former affiliations: Tupi and Globo (1976-1980); TV Globo (1980-1987); SBT (1987-1993); Rede Manchete (1993-1999); TV! (1999); RedeTV! (1999-2002)

TV Marabá was a Brazilian television station based in Marabá, Pará. An affiliate of Boas Novas, it broadcast on analog VHF channel 13. The station was named after its owner, the Municipality of Marabá.

It went on air in 1976 (becoming the first television station in eastern Pará) until it went off the air in 2019, when it voluntarily went off the air after the city hall failed to transition from the analog signal to the digital signal (channel 42).

== History ==
Before the concession, the city of Marabá in Pará is located in the southeast of Pará, 1006 kilometers from the capital Belém by road (being the main city in eastern Pará) and 397 kilometers from the city of Imperatriz in Maranhão, also by road. In August 1976, the city's appointed mayor, Haroldo da Costa Bezerra Pinheiro, presented his own plan for implementing the television channel in Marabá, promising to put it on air before November 15 (National Holiday) of the same year.

That year, Mayor Haroldo Pinheiro promised to put the TV station on the air in the small city of Marabá so that the population could follow the news that had already reached the country's large urban centers. Pinheiro asked for a study about the importance of this vehicle and the technical aspects for installing the station and obtained assistance from the main traders in the city, obtaining Cr$263,395.00 (two hundred and sixty-three thousand and three hundred ninety-five cruzeiros) out of the total of Cr$1,009,117.00 (one million and nine thousand and one hundred and seventeen cruzeiros).

In September, a month after Pinheiro presented the station's project, the Ministry of Communications published in the Official Gazette of the Union (DOU) the ordinance of the Basic Plan for the distribution of 112 channels in UHF for the 51 cities of Pará (average of two channels in each city), through the National Telecommunications Department (DENTEL).[1]

At the time, the Federal Government under the presidency of Ernesto Geisel (1974–1979) was implementing the UHF system in Brazil in the interior of the country (as was happening in the United States), through Brazilian commercial and educational TV stations, since UHF presents quality and higher range than VHF. However, UHF transmissions on Brazilian TV stations did not take off in the interior of the country in the 1970s because televisions with two tuning bands and respective converter (VHF and UHF) were very expensive, in addition to few educational and commercial TVs tuned to UHF (the only one to do so was TV Ajuricaba between 1967 and 1980, initially on channel 38 and then on channel 20 in Manaus, Amazonas). All TV stations in the capitals that had retransmitters used the UHF band to relay images and sounds to the interior of the States, which they converted to VHF. Until then, the use of the UHF band for TVs was unexplored and only began to be used on a large scale in the 90s.

After the publication of the Basic Plan ordinance by the Ministry of Communications in the Official Gazette of the Union (DOU), for the distribution of UHF channels to cities in Pará, the City Hall and local businesses took action and scheduled the inauguration for November 6. of the broadcaster. Stores and warehouses drew up lists listing possible buyers of television receivers (even those who were not yet in a position to purchase the receiver within a period of up to 24 months to pay, or until November 1978), with the unprecedented back-and-forth of trucks delivering devices to homes “just to try” or “to pay for in 24 months”.

As there was a rush for installation, it was not possible to install the tower in the chosen location (7 kilometers from the municipal headquarters) nor even the studios to show the videotape (VT). Also combined with political disputes, the opposition was discrediting the administration because of television for the people, as the mayor promised in the mayoral campaign (in 1974) and his administration was being hit for not having fulfilled the promise.

The station was provisionally installed on top of Loja Armazém Paraíba, at km 4 of the Transamazônica Highway. Meanwhile, the City Hall used the station's facilities, under the responsibility of a technician from Imperatriz (MA), selected to install the station's equipment. After that, the scheduled opening day (November 6) was postponed for more than three days.

On the night of November 9 (the day agreed for the station to go on air), viewers were waiting for Channel 13 to go on air. TV Marabá goes on air, recording a videotape message from Mayor Haroldo Pinheiro. In his inauguration speech, Pinheiro spoke about the achievements in municipal administration and about the television that arrived in the city. The inauguration speech was recorded in the city of Imperatriz at the TV Imperatriz studios, which opened a year earlier.

Until the arrival of television, there were no radio stations (the majority of the city's population received signals from stations in Pará and other states, including foreign broadcasts), there were two newspapers with a few pages that were not daily (despite 80% of the population was illiterate and there were few schools) and several loudspeakers on which traders shouted to the locality to send messages. It is estimated that on the day TV Marabá opened, there were 3,000 televisions in the city and rural area of Marabá, with 30 thousand inhabitants, of which 15 thousand in Marabá and the urban perimeter.

The station's biggest accolade was the broadcast of programs recorded on U-matic tapes brought by the TV stations in the city of Belém from Liberal (affiliated to Globo) and Marajoara (Tupi's O&O), in addition to TV Imperatriz, brought on daily plane trips from Belém and Imperatriz (at the time, the roads were full of dirt and took a week to travel).

The images displayed by U-matic on TV Marabá were new at the time, as it became one of the first Brazilian TV stations to be opened with this technology, which was restricted only to stations in the capitals and some cities in the interior, with color programming, and in black-and-white, one of the last TV stations to show black-and-white programming in the country.

Initially, the station only went on air at night, to show the programming of the two main networks in the country at the time (Tupi and Globo). From Globo, telenovelas, TV series and the news program Jornal Nacional were shown; from Tupi, telenovelas (among them, O Julgamento) and entertainment (Gente Inocente and Petrocelli) were shown.

After going on air, TV Marabá should have three months of experimentation (November 9, 1976 until February 9, 1977) on Channel 38 UHF (the channel stipulated by DENTEL) but due to technical considerations (practically all TV sets only had channels 2 to 13 VHF), the broadcaster chose to go on air on Channel 13. The vice-mayor, José Brasil de Araújo, stated in the Veja magazine report:

Dentel (National Telecommunications Department) knows this, but who is going to close our TV?

This question arose in the city (declared as a National Security Zone) where the 23rd Army Brigade, the 2nd Jungle Infantry Battalion and the Military Police barracks are located, where there are color television sets.

After the end of the three-month trial period, the station, which only aired at night, began airing in the late afternoon. In March, the City Hall sent a letter to all traders who contributed to the first stage of the season. The reason is to ask for authorization from taxpayers to sign an agreement in which Rede Globo's programming would be repeated in the region, but for this purpose it would be linked to TV Liberal in Belém. Only five of the taxpayers agreed with the proposal, as the majority of traders want that they are majority shareholders, fearing that a local politician will use the station for political purposes.

“It is because there is resistance, because the mayor [Haroldo Pinheiro] had promised us [the merchants of Marabá] that we would be majority shareholders of the TV station [TV Marabá], in accordance with his plan to prevent his successor from using it. politically in the future.”

TV Liberal's proposal has not been ruled out, but it also shows programs from TV Marajoara (from TV Tupi), although this would regulate Channel 13, but shareholders are satisfied with Marajoara, with the carrying of advertising.

In an edition dated April 13, Veja magazine published about the emergence of the station, both behind the scenes and personalities of the station, one of the few records of the station.

In 1978, DENTEL regularized the irregularity of the TV Marabá channel, by approving the change from Channel 38 to 13, ending this impasse from a technical point of view, as channel 38 was never used by the broadcaster. During the 1970s, TV Marabá's programming was based on VT programs, coming from Maranhão (on TV Imperatriz) and Pará (on TVs Liberal and Marajoara).

After Haroldo Pinheiro left city hall (1975 to 1979), TV Marabá was managed by the appointed mayor, PM Major Benedito Orlando de Farias Aguiar. Mayor Benedito Aguiar remained in office until 1981.

In 1980, when the Federal Government revoked Rede Tupi's concessions, including Marajoara, TV Marabá was forced to show only programming shown by TVs Liberal and Imperatriz on Rede Globo.

After Benedito Aguiar left city hall (1979 to 1981), TV Marabá was managed by the appointed mayor Samuel Rodrigues de Monção. Mayor Samuel Monção remained in office until 1983. At that time, in May 1981, the informative newspaper O Mandi reported the change of affiliation of TV Marabá.

Maranhão is gradually taking over our region. TV Marabá started repeating the signal from TV Difusora de São Luís. Throughout Pará, television images are taken to the interior through Funtelpa (Fundação das Telecommunications do Pará), the same as Embratel does with the states.

In 1982, Rede Globo began transmitting all programming via satellite, ending trips made by plane from São Luís to Marabá. That year, after years of being a mere broadcaster of Globo's programming, it started to relay the network in its entirety via satellite Brasil Sat 2.

In 1983, after Paulo Bosco Rodrigues Jadão took over as mayor, he invited journalist Hiroshi Bogéa to implement local programming on the station. In 1984, the station already showed three live news programs in the morning, afternoon and evening (Bom Dia Marabá, TV Marabá and Boa Noite Marabá).

As time went by, the structure of TV Marabá began to fall into disrepair, causing the station to go for a few hours and even days without a signal, provoking protests from viewers.

Until 1985, TV Marabá operated alone in the region, when TV Tocantins went on air on analog channel 10 (affiliated with Rede Bandeirantes), ending the monopoly of the only broadcaster in the city and region.

In 1987, due to Globo's inferior structure, the station lost Globo's affiliation to the recently opened affiliate TV Liberal Marabá on analog channel 2. With this, it became an affiliate of SBT and was mentioned as an affiliate in 1990 on Silvia Poppovic's program. At that time, the mayor was Hamilton de Brito Bezerra (PMDB), who remained in office until 1989. Afterwards, the station was administered by the mayor, Dr. Nagib Mutran Neto, from 1989 to 1993. He decided to have his own TV station in several cities in Pará. To this end, he became a partner of Rede de Comunicação Regional (RCR), the corporate name of Rede de Comunicação Regional Ltda., entered the competition to win TV stations in Pará and obtained authorization through acts signed between November 14, 1996, and December 17, 1996, to install TV A relayers, all on UHF, in six municipalities: Altamira, Itupiranga, São João do Araguaia, Xinguara, Conceição do Araguaia and Parauapebas. Mutran is linked to senator and former governor Jader Barbalho.

In 1992, in the municipal election year, a controversial event happened at the station: Mayor Nagib Neto decided to transfer all the equipment and structure of the station to Grupo W. Norte to air TV Eldorado with the SBT signal on analog channel 7 in 1993. In other words: TV Eldorado was using the structure of TV Marabá, which was off the air. As a result, in 1993, it began retransmitting Rede Manchete's signal.

The transfer of the entire public structure, which includes the diversion of equipment from the municipal station to the private sector by the city hall, became a local scandal. The case was the target of complaints by the Public Ministry both locally and at the state level for being illegal, as private companies cannot manage any public agency.

In the same year, the former mayor and founder of the station, Haroldo Pinheiro was elected mayor and was sworn in on January 1, 1993, returning to command the city hall.

In 1993, at the beginning of Pinheiro's municipal government, a local CPI was installed to investigate equipment deviations and irregularities in the concession of TV Marabá to the private group, but nothing came of it, as government councilors and the city hall blocked the investigations. .

The scandal ended after Grupo W. Norte was forced to return all equipment to TV Marabá after purchasing its own for use on TV Eldorado, which made the broadcaster return to the air.

In 1996, Geraldo Mendes de Castro Veloso, vice Sebastião Miranda and the 17 councilors and alternates were elected and took office from January 1, 1997, until January 1, 2001.

During the 90s, TV Marabá gained new competitors in the city, the relays of Rede Vida, Rede União, Canção Nova and Rede Record (TV Fox). In radio broadcasting, the city gained four radio stations: Rádio Liberal e Liberal FM, Rádio Clube e Clube FM and Alternativa FM (closed in 2001).

In 1999, with the end of Manchete, which became TV!, TV Marabá repeated the new transitional network until it became RedeTV! at the end of the year.

In 2000, the then vice Sebastião Miranda (PTB), better known as Tião Miranda and the 17 councilors and alternates were elected and took office from January 1, 2001, until January 1, 2005.

In 2001, in the first term of the Tião Miranda (PTB) government and almost the end of the contract with RedeTV!, the councilor and pastor of the evangelical church Assembly of God, Leodato Marques (PP) negotiated with the city hall so that they could relay the Rede Boas Novas network (RBN). The Rede Vida signal (channel 15) also operates at the station's headquarters, which it later shares with Canção Nova (channel 32), both from the Catholic Church. In other words: the Marabá TV tower emitted signals from three stations, one evangelical station and two Catholic.

At the beginning of 2002, TV Marabá changed to RedeTV! and becomes affiliated with Rede Boas Novas (RBN), the audience drops after the station's conversion to Christian programming.

In 2007, after Rede Boas Novas was renamed simply Boas Novas, TV Marabá began to identify itself simply as RBN Marabá with its logo, although it maintains its old name.

In 2018, after two postponements of the transition from analog to digital signal and contrary to the expectation of possible transmission of digital TV from TV Marabá, the city council decided to maintain analogue signal until the end of the analog to digital transition period, which ended at 11:59 p.m. on January 10, 2019, along with other stations.

On January 20, 2020, Boas Novas allowed TV Kairós to become a new affiliate of the network after TV Marabá took a long time to return its signal in the region, which characterizes the loss of the station's affiliation.
