= TV Sergipe =

TV Sergipe (ZYB 830)
Aracaju, Sergipe; Brazil
- Channels: Digital: 33 (UHF); Virtual: 4
- Branding: TV Sergipe

Programming
- Affiliations: TV Globo

Ownership
- Owner: Grupo Sergipe de Comunicação; (Rádio Televisão de Sergipe Ltda.)
- Sister stations: FM Sergipe

History
- First air date: November 15, 1971
- Former call signs: ZYB 831 (1975-2018)
- Former channel numbers: Analog: 4 (VHF, 1975–2018)
- Former affiliations: Rede Tupi (1971-1973)

Technical information
- Licensing authority: ANATEL
- ERP: 5 kW
- Transmitter coordinates: 10°53′27.9″S 37°4′10.4″W

Links
- Public license information: Profile
- Website: redeglobo.globo.com/se/tvsergipe

TV Sergipe is a Brazilian television station based in Aracaju, capital of the state of Sergipe. It operates on channel 4 (33 digital UHF) and is affiliated to TV Globo. It belongs to the Sergipe Communication Group, owned by Lourdes Franco, also responsible for FM Sergipe. His brother-in-law, Walter Franco, is also responsible for TV Atalaia, however there are no links between the two stations.

== History ==
In the early 1960s, Irineu Fontes, a radio salesman, travels to São Paulo to see the impact of television on locals. Upon returning to Aracaju, he held talks with the mayor of the time, Godofredo Diniz, who was interested in finding money for the first television antenna in the state. A relay station was installed at Morro do Urubu, but the reception of the signal coming from Recife's TV Jornal was precarious, coming at a low power.

Earlier, in 1959, later TV Excelsior staff member Nairson Menezes set up a campaign for the implementation of a television station in Sergipe, which failed. Upon returning to Sergipe later in the 60s, he finds a partnership with businessman Francisco Pimentel Franco. The station became the first to have equipment manufactured in Brazil, with Maxwell providing its equipment. In 1967, a test broadcast was conducted, followed by a three-month authorization in 1968. Further experimental broadcasts included the Apollo 11 moon landings and Brazil's win at the 1970 FIFA World Cup.

On May 12, 1971, Rádio e Televisão de Sergipe made definitive test broadcasts, with local programming and documentaries provided by the French and German embassies. On November 15, 1971, TV Sergipe started its regular broadcasts as a TV Tupi affiliate. The station opened in the late afternoon and closed at around midnight. In addition to local programming there was also news and filmed content. The later arrival of videotape allowed the station to broadcast programs and telenovelas that were being broadcast in the southern states.

On October 6, 1973, TV Sergipe leaves Rede Tupi and joins TV Globo. Tupi recouped its lost affiliation in 1975 when TV Atalaia signed on. However, Globo noticed that after becoming its affiliate, the station was still operating in an amateurish fashion, with old equipment. Facing these problems, and in order to invest in the arrival of new equipment, the station is sold to TV Aratu, who had an ambitious plan: forming a regional television network. Aratu's plan backfired and the station was later sold to the Franco family.

On August 31, 2017, it was announced that Rede Integração, responsible for the management of several Globo affiliates in Minas Gerais, including the station in the city of Uberlândia where the company is headquartered, was trading 49% of the shares of Rádio Televisão de Sergipe, responsible for TV Sergipe and its co-sister FM Sergipe, for an estimated value of R$48,000,000 (forty-eight million reais). Given the administrative problems that have occurred in recent years, in addition to the dismissal of professionals, the intention to sell the group was already expressed by the station's owner, Albano Franco. However, Lourdes Franco, widow of the station's former partner, Augusto César Franco and owner of 50% of the shares, had preference in the event of the group's sale. On December 4, the 50% that belonged to Albano Franco was sold to Lourdes, who together with her daughter Carolina Franco became owners of TV Sergipe and FM Sergipe.

== Branding ==
The first logo, a cangaceiro inside a stylized 4, was created by Antônio Nóia but never made it on air. The one that was adopted was a sort of flower, created out of three combined Ss, with RGB coloring. On March 1, 2010, with the start of HD broadcasts, the logo was replaced by Globo's 2008 sphere with two Ss in the colored texture of the network's logo. The rebrand process led by Wadson Rodrigues started in July 2009. There were two possible logos, the first being the new version of the extant logo, rebadged, and the second being the new concept that was approved.

== Technical information ==
| Virtual channel | Digital channel | Screen | Content |
|---|---|---|---|
| 4.1 | 33 UHF | 1080i | TV Sergipe/Globo's main schedule |

=== Analog-to-digital conversion ===
Based on the federal decree transitioning Brazilian TV stations from analog to digital signals, TV Sergipe, as well as the other stations in Aracaju, ceased broadcasting on VHF channel 4 on May 30, 2018, following the official ANATEL roadmap.
