= TV Ceará (channel 2) =

- Fortaleza, Ceará; Brazil
- Channels: Analog: 2 (VHF)

Programming
- Affiliations: Rede Tupi

Ownership
- Owner: Diários Associados; (Ceará Rádio Clube S.A.)

History
- First air date: November 26, 1960
- Last air date: July 18, 1980

Technical information
- Licensing authority: DENTEL

TV Ceará was a Brazilian television station based in Fortaleza, capital of the state of Ceará. It operated on VHF channel 2 and was an owned-and-operated station of Rede Tupi. Launched in 1960, the station represented the beginning of television production in the state, launching names currently known to the Cearese public. It was owned by Diários Associados, at the time led by Assis Chateaubriand, who was already active in the state, as they maintained the Correio do Ceará newspaper and Ceará Rádio Clube.

== History ==
On May 23, 1959, the foundations of the future TV Ceará building was laid, on Avenida Antônio Sales, in the Estância Castelo neighborhood (currently Dionísio Torres). In 1960, the equipment for the future TV Ceará tower was unloaded at the port of Mucuripe. According to news published by Correio do Ceará (at the time, owned by Diários Associados, which were installing the station), the equipment was of British origin and weighed 30 tons, which would be installed on a 90 meter high base, as well as an 18 meter antenna.

Installed in Estância Castelo (current Dionísio Torres neighborhood) where the Edson Queiroz Group holding company is located on Avenida Antônio Sales, it had several names such as Emiliano Queiroz, Renato “Didi” Aragão, Ayla Maria, Augusto Borges, Paulo Limaverde, B. de Paiva, João Ramos, Wilson Machado, Guilherme Neto, Ary Sherlock, Hiramisa Serra, Karla Peixoto, Assis Santos and many others. It also had romance theater, videorama, a storyteller and on Sundays, a musical show and mystery and comedy programs, all along the lines of the two main Tupi stations in São Paulo and Rio de Janeiro.

Due to the revocation of the concession by the military government, on July 18, 1980, along with six other stations from Rede Tupi, TV Ceará was shut down. The station closed at 11:19am with the arrival of the local DENTEL team. In front of the cameras was Augusto Borges, reading messages from viewers who appealed to the President João Figueiredo to revoke the measure to close the seven peremptory licenses. One of the last faces seen on the station was the singer Fagner, whose career started on the station's entertainment programs in the 1970s, claiming that the shutdowns were "all a part of a plot against Brazilian creativity", in a speech that lasted eight minutes, hoping to see the station restored soon.

After the revocation, TV Tupi's concessions were divided between businessmen Adolfo Bloch and Silvio Santos, where they founded, respectively, TV Manchete and SBT, with TV Ceará channel 2 being transferred to Adolfo Bloch, becoming TV Manchete Fortaleza (launched in February 1984) until 1999, when it was extinguished along with the network and gave way to RedeTV! Fortaleza.
