= TV Brasil Oeste =

TV Brasil Oeste (ZYQ 723)
- Cuiabá, Mato Grosso; Brazil
- City: Cuiabá
- Channels: Digital: 40 (UHF); Virtual: 8
- Branding: TV Brasil Oeste

Programming
- Affiliations: Rede Brasil de Televisão

Ownership
- Owner: Grupo Futurista de Comunicação; (Televisão Centro América Ltda.)

History
- Founded: April 11, 1975
- First air date: April 26, 1978
- Former call signs: ZYA 943 (1978–2018)
- Former channel numbers: Analog: 8 (VHF, 1978–2018)
- Former affiliations: Rede Tupi (1978–1980); TVS-Record (1980–1981); SBT (1981–1984); Rede Manchete (1984–1986); Rede Bandeirantes (1986–2009); Rede 21 (2009–2013); CNT (2013–2015); TV Cultura (2015); RBTV (2021–2022)

Technical information
- Licensing authority: ANATEL
- ERP: 2 kW
- Transmitter coordinates: 15°34′57.9″S 56°4′49.3″W

Links
- Public license information: Profile
- Website: tbomt.com.br

TV Brasil Oeste (channel 8) is a Brazilian television station based in Cuiabá, capital of the state of Mato Grosso. The station is an affiliate of Rede Brasil de Televisão and is owned by Grupo Futurista de Comunicação, owned by businessman and politician João Campos, who also owns Mix FM Cuiabá and Massa FM Cuiabá.

== History ==
The concession for channel 8 VHF in Cuiabá, the second in the municipality, was granted by President Ernesto Geisel on April 11, 1975, to businessman Fause Anache. The station was set up with modern equipment from Germany, and was fully prepared to broadcast in color. After a period of testing that began on April 5, 1978, TV Brasil Oeste was inaugurated on April 26, at 4 pm, in a ceremony attended by the then communications minister Euclides Quandt de Oliveira, who pressed the button that put the station on air. Initially, it retransmitted the programming of Rede Tupi, which was in its throes, being revoked by the Federal Government on July 18, 1980. It was also the first station in Cuiabá to broadcast its programming continuously, since at the time of its creation, its only competitor, TV Centro América, still aired daily programming with a break in transmissions during the afternoon.

On August 19, 1981, after a year of independent programming, TV Brasil Oeste and other stations that had affiliated with Tupi joined the newly created SBT. At the time, with the network's programming schedule filled with canned foreign series for most of the day, the broadcaster invested heavily in local programming, a fact that was decisive for its consolidation. On July 16, 1984, TV Brasil Oeste left SBT and affiliated with Rede Manchete, even showing the special show O Mundo Mágico to the Mato Grosso public in its inaugural program, the same one that had aired at the network's inauguration a year earlier. However, the affiliation with Manchete was also short-lived. At the end of 1985, the management of Rede Bandeirantes approached TV Brasil Oeste, which was already making losses with the Rio station's programming, which was aimed at a more elite audience and did not focus on classes C and D, which were the majority of the audience. After three months of negotiation, TV Brasil Oeste terminated the contract with Rede Manchete after 1 and a half years of affiliation, migrating to Rede Bandeirantes on April 1, 1986.

In 1996, Júlio Campos obtained another 4 retransmitters. He received authorization (through ordinances signed on August 15 and 28), to install TV retransmitters (RTV) in Alta Floresta, Chapada dos Guimarães, Rondonópolis and Sinop. The station was the first TV station to retransmit its programming via satellite to the interior, reaching more than 120 cities in the state.

On May 16, 2009, TV Cidade Verde Cuiabá became an affiliate of Bandeirantes and TBO became Rede 21. Before that, the Campos Family outsourced the administration of the station to businessman Luiz Carlos Beccari, president of Grupo Cidade Verde de Comunicação.

The station became affiliated with Rede 21, a network that had practically its entire network rented by the World Church of the Power of God, owned by the apostle Valdemiro Santiago.

After a certain period in which the station was under the control of the church, it was once again managed by Grupo Futurista, owned by the Campos family, and put its old name on the programming, still maintaining Rede 21 transmission.

Despite having 22 hours a day of programs developed by the Worldwide Church of the Power of God, TV Brasil Oeste began to resume its journalism and began broadcasting Jornal da Tarde daily. The news program aired for several months at 3 pm. Then it went to 1 pm.

On December 1, 2012, the general director of Grupo Futurista de Comunicação, Isabel Coelho Pinto Campos, died after 8 years of treatment for uterine cancer, with metastases. In communication, Isabel participated in the implementation and inauguration of Rádio Industrial, the first in Várzea Grande, commanded the restructuring and modernization of the extinct newspaper O Estado de Mato Grosso, making it the first to be printed using the off-set system and in color and directed TV Brasil Oeste, making it the first broadcaster to broadcast via satellite throughout the state.

On January 17, 2013, Thursday, TBO started transmitting the signal from the National Television Center, CNT. During this transition, only Jornal da Tarde, which was produced in-house, remained as regional programming, being broadcast in a daily edition at 1 pm and a repeat at 6 pm.

During 2013, the station gained attractions, and now has presenters Everton Pop, Priscila Hauer, Jajah Neves, Radamés Alves, Onofre Júnior, Fábio Senna, Éder Moraes, Igor Taques and Claudia Campello, among others. TBO also returned to broadcasting IMPD programming at limited times, ending the transfer with the Valdemiro Santiago church in August 2015.

As of November 2014, TV Brasil Oeste underwent another important change. The company's management was passed on by Júlio Campos to a new group. The businessman and deputy State Deputy Ueiner Neves de Freitas, known publicly as Jajah Neves, assumed the presidency of the TBO, with businessman Henry Kenner as his vice-president. A major structural reform began to be put into practice and many investments were made, including preparing the broadcaster for digitalization.

New programs went on air on December 1, 2014. They are: Café da Manhã with Radamés, A Cara do Povo with Ademar Jajah, Linha de Fogo – with Messias Nogueira, and Fatos e Boatos – with Adriano Guedes and Ariane Valadão; Still on the schedule from Monday to Friday, the schedule includes the program MT é Mais, presented by Onofre Jr.

From February 10, 2015, TBO became an affiliate of TV Cultura, until then aired through a retransmitter on channel 17 UHF. So, with a wide range of local programming, the broadcaster has, according to CEO Jajah Neves, also an excellent content network, "a determining factor in maintaining the programming goal that consolidates the channel as the broadcaster for those who live in Mato Grosso."

According to the portal of the generating network group, CMais, with the expansion of its signal within the State, Culture reaches a reach of 102 million people throughout Brazil, currently being in 20 states. This partnership also includes the exchange of journalistic content, technical cooperation and co-production projects. However, the affiliation lasted a short time – 10 months – and TV Cultura stopped being shown on channel 8, returning to channel 17, previously with just a static image with the logo of the São Paulo broadcaster.

In December 2015, the broadcaster left TV Cultura and transferred to Rede Brasil. From then on, confusion began in this area: TV Cuiabá was already retransmitting the station. Knowing that another channel was on the same network and in the same city, the management of TV Cuiabá took legal action against TBO. When contacted, CEO Jajah Neves said that the affiliation would be with another network, TV União do Ceará, but its signal is not aired on the Cuiaban station.

In 2016, an embezzlement once again raised controversy at TBO: Jajah Neves left the broadcaster on January 25, leaving his role as CEO and removing his two programs – Fiscal do Povo and Programa Jajah Neves – from programming. The likely reason was the criticism he received, but he published on social media that he has already migrated to TV Mato Grosso, saying that "the fight continues" and "I will continue to be the “people's inspector” bringing to the TV screen what the people want and need to know".

When questioned about having leased TBO, Jajah replied that he did not buy it, he only "managed it for a certain period". Since he started, he took over not only the direction of TBO, but also the radio stations Jovem Pan (formerly Antena FM) and Rádio Industrial.

In November 2016, the general director of TV Brasil Oeste, Júlio Campos, announced the inauguration of a new channel studio with HD transmission. In April 2021, it became affiliated with RBTV.
