= TV Sentinela =

TV Sentinela (Sentinela TV)
- Óbidos, Pará; Brazil
- Channels: Analog: 7

Programming
- Affiliations: Rede Bandeirantes

Ownership
- Operator: Sistema Sentinela de Comunicação

History
- Founded: 1978
- Former names: TV Sentinela
- Former affiliations: Rede Tupi (1978-1980) SBT (1981-1991)

Technical information
- Licensing authority: ANATEL

TV Sentinela (channel 7) is a Rede Bandeirantes-affiliated television station in Óbidos, Pará. Founded in 1978 by Max Hamoy, it is one of Pará's oldest television stations being in operation outside of Belém that is still on air, being older than Santarém's TV Tapajós by a year, and the oldest in the Tapajós region in operation.

== History ==
It is unclear when exactly TV Sentinela first aired, but the station was founded in 1978, with the station reportedly starting ahead of the 1978 FIFA World Cup. Max Hamoy, a descendant of Egyptian and Moroccan Jews, while on vacation in the first half of that year, encountered Embratel employee Fernando Guarany to install two relay stations from TV Parintins to the city of Óbidos; however, the signal was weak and a new, improvised antenna had to be built. Local programming started with a series of videotaped movies, all of which were in English with no translation. With the constant movie repeats, Hamoy started travelling to Belém's TV Marajoara to obtain tapes from the station to relay them locally.

Its new transmitter was inaugurated on September 19, 1979. In December 1979, Hamoy bought new equipment (four videotape machines) to improve its coverage area, this time covering Óbidos, Oriximiná, Juruti, Faro, Terra Santa, Porto Trombetas, Alenquer and Santarém. In 1981, it became a charter affiliate of SBT, being listed in corporate advertisements issued by the network for the print industry. Since 1991, the station is a Rede Bandeirantes affiliate.

On August 2, 2012, the station resumed its broadcasts with a new, improved transmitter and new facilities.

The outlet, alongside Rádio e TV Atalaia and Blog do Jeso, was used for illegal political activities by mayor Mario Henrique in 2013. Its assets were blocked in May 2020 for the sum of R$396,193.20.

== Programming ==
TV Sentinela airs Jornal da Cidade, which replaces Sentinela Notícias since 2018. The station also uses reports from RBA TV and Band Cidade Amazonas.

Discontinued:

- Sentinela Notícias (2015 - 2018)
- Sentinela News (2021)
- Bom Dia Sentinela (2022)
