= TV Cidade (Altamira) =

Altamira, Pará; Brazil
- Channels: Digital: 36 UHF; Virtual: 19

Programming
- Affiliations: Rede Bandeirantes

Ownership
- Operator: Rádio e TV Cidade
- Sister stations: Rádio Cidade FM

History
- Founded: 22 December 2014

Technical information
- Licensing authority: ANATEL
- Power: 1 kW

TV Cidade (also known as Band Altamira) is a Brazilian television station based in Altamira, Pará. It operates on channel 19 (36 UHF digital), and is affiliated with Rede Bandeirantes.

== History ==
Rede Bandeirantes' programming was first broadcast in Altamira in the 1980s by TV Mansour, which went on the air on channel 8 VHF through an agreement with Rede de Comunicação Regional. In 1993, TV Mansour went off the air, its building located on Avenida Tancredo Neves was leased to the owners of TV Transamazônica, which operates on channel 13 VHF and an affiliate of TV Liberal. The Maiorana network now has rights to Rede Globo's signal in much of the state.

At the same time, TV Altamira, which stopped broadcasting Globo, opted for an affiliation with Band. The partnership lasted until 1997. On 17 December 1996, Rádio e Televisão Mansour was granted channel 19 UHF in Altamira, which began operating as a Band repeater. Despite Anatel's authorization, the channel only went on air in 2009.

On 22 December 2014, TV Cidade was inaugurated through the concession, with the premiere of the program Barra Pesada Altamira, presented by Tinho Carlos. The station was founded by the businessman Irlendes Rodrigues, having as administrator the businessman Maurício Nascimento, son of councilman Marcos Nascimento.

== Technical information ==
Virtual channel	Physical channel	Screen	Content
19.1	36 UHF	1080i	TV Cidade / Band's main schedule

TV Cidade switched on its digital signal on 2 October 2021, on physical UHF channel 36. With its digital broadcasts, the station started broadcasting to other cities in the region, such as Vitória do Xingu and Brasil Novo.

The station voluntarily shut down its analog signal in March 2023.
