= Raimundo Varela =

Brazilian television presenter (1947–2023)

- Born: Raimundo Varella Freire Júnior; 30 November 1947; Itabuna, Bahia, Brazil
- Died: 7 September 2023 (aged 75); Salvador, Bahia, Brazil

Raimundo Varella Freire Júnior (30 November 1947 – 7 September 2023), best known as Raimundo Varela, was a Brazilian television presenter.

== Life and career ==
Born in Itabuna on 30 November 1947, as a child Varela moved with his family to Salvador. Before starting his television career Varella had several jobs, including as a labourer in a cement factory, a street vendor, a taxi driver and a professional football player for the Ypiranga Clube and the Associação Desportiva Leônico. He began his entertainment career in the 1970s as a judge in the TV Itapoan variety show Big Ben, and later worked as a sports commentator on the program Papo de Bola.

Varela had his breakout in 1981, as a presenter of the talk show Balanço Geral, which he hosted until 1990 and again from 1997 to 2020, later still appearing in the show as a pundit. Beyond his television career, he ran several times as mayor of Salvador, always eventually dropping out of the race. In 2006, he had a major kidney failure and underwent a liver and kidney transplant. Varela died on 7 September 2023, at the age of 75.
