= TV Rádio Clube de Pernambuco =

TV Rádio Clube (ZYB 309)
- Recife, Pernambuco; Brazil
- Channels: Analog: 6 (VHF)

Programming
- Affiliations: Rede Tupi

Ownership
- Owner: Diários Associados

History
- First air date: June 4, 1960
- Last air date: July 18, 1980

Technical information
- Licensing authority: DENTEL

TV Rádio Clube de Pernambuco was a Brazilian television station based in Recife, capital of the state of Pernambuco. It operated on VHF channel 6 and was an owned-and-operated station of Rede Tupi. Founded in 1960, it was the first station in the state and the Northeast region, but in 1980, it was shut down after the Federal Government revoked its concession due to the Diários Associados crisis.

== History ==
Rádio Clube made its first closed-circuit experimental broadcast on July 23, 1954, at the station's 31st anniversary event. Assis Chateaubriand sent technicians from TV Tupi Rio de Janeiro. The introduction of the station depended largely on the status of hydro-electric dams of the region, and in 1958, the license was given the green light.

Experimental broadcasts started in January 1960. Regular broadcasts started on June 4, 1960. Its official inauguration took place two weeks before TV Jornal do Commercio, but its operation did not precede that of the latter, which had already been transmitting images on an experimental basis a few months earlier, with live programs and better picture quality, while Channel 6's broadcasts lacked quality or programming, with only static images being shown most of the time.

Initially, like the competing broadcaster, the programming was local, with staff coming from the Clube and Jornal do Commercio radio stations. Many of these artists later transferred to stations in the Southeast of Brazil, such as José Santa Cruz, Lúcio Mauro, Aguinaldo Batista, Arlete Salles, José Augusto Branco, José Wilker, among others.

With the financial crisis experienced by the Sistema Jornal do Commercio de Comunicação, TV Rádio Clube no longer felt competition from TV Jornal for a period in the early 1970s. The acquisition of new equipment provided better images, combined with the fact of transmitting, live, the programming generated on broadcasters in the Southeast. However, the crisis at Diários Associados also had an impact on TV Rádio Clube, despite being the station with the best financial stability on the network.

In September 1978, a fire hit a large part of the Palácio do Rádio building, destroying the station's archives. The competing broadcasters showed solidarity and the programming, precariously, was carried out with the help of TV Jornal do Commercio, TV Universitária and TV Globo Nordeste, the three other stations available at the time. For some time, TV Rádio Clube's programming was made using a heavy amount of external resources, until the broadcaster managed to buy new equipment and get back on its feet in 1979.

Despite being financially healthy, TV Rádio Clube and six other Rede Tupi stations had their concessions revoked on July 18, 1980, due to social security debts and financial corruption at Diários Associados. Its last images were aired on the morning of that day, with a speech by its director, Ricardo Pinto, among the 160 employees who were watching the definitive end of its operations. Then, Osório Romero, journalism editor, narrated the work of three DENTEL technicians who were sent to turn off the transmitters, taking the station off the air definitively at 10:50am. The signal and message were received in Pernambuco, Paraíba, Rio Grande do Norte and Alagoas.

== First Radio station in Brasil ==
The first public radio broadcast in Brazil was documented in 1919 by the radio station Rádio Clube de Pernambuco.
