= TV Vitória =

TV Vitória (ZYA 531)
- Espírito Santo; Brazil
- City: Vitória
- Channels: Digital: 38 (UHF); Virtual: 6

Programming
- Affiliations: Record

Ownership
- Owner: Rede Vitória de Comunicação (Grupo Buaiz); (Televisão Vitória S/A)

History
- First air date: September 8, 1961
- Former channel numbers: Analog: 4 (VHF, 1961–1974); 6 (VHF, 1974–2018)
- Former affiliations: Rede Tupi (1961–1980); TVS-Record (1980–1981); SBT (1981–1984); Rede Manchete (1984–1998)

Technical information
- Licensing authority: ANATEL
- ERP: 1.3 kW
- Transmitter coordinates: 20°18′32.5″S 40°20′22.2″W

Links
- Public license information: Profile
- Website: folhavitoria.com.br/videos/tv-vitoria

TV Vitória (channel 6) is a Brazilian television station based in Vitória, capital of the state of Espírito Santo, serving as an affiliate of the Record network for the entire state. It is owned by Rede Vitória de Comunicação, a subsidiary of the Buaiz Group, also responsible for the radio stations Jovem Pan FM Vitória and Jovem Pan News Vitória. The broadcaster maintains studios at the Buaiz Group headquarters in Parque Moscoso, in addition to commercial offices in Praia do Canto, and its transmitters are at the top of Morro da Fonte Grande.

== History ==
TV Vitória was the first television station in Espírito Santo, being opened on September 8, 1961, on the 410th anniversary of the capital of Espírito Santo, Vitória, by Diários Associados. Initially, it produced local programs and retransmitted programs produced by TV Tupi São Paulo, the embryo of Rede Tupi, which emerged in the following decade. The station opened without a concession to operate, and its status was only regularized in June 1979, under the administration of communications minister Haroldo Corrêa de Mattos.

With the end of Rede Tupi in 1980, TV Vitória was one of the Associadas stations that was freed from revocation. After a period of independent programming and the stop-gap solution relaying programs produced by TVS Rio de Janeiro and Record, TV Vitória became, in 1981, one of the first affiliates of SBT. In 1984, Diários Associados sold the station and Rádio Vitória to the Buaiz Group, after businessman João Calmon bought the shares from the other shareholders and resold the station to Américo Buaiz Filho. In the same year, the broadcaster became affiliated to Rede Manchete.

In 1992, the station launched Rede Vitória de Notícias, which consisted of a partnership with newspapers in the interior of the state to disseminate articles that were broadcast over the telephone by a reporter from the local newspaper during the broadcast of the news, and in return, the TV broadcast the name of the newspapers in the credits. This partnership lasted for two years, because newspaper owners started asking for money and the company was not willing to pay. On October 1, 1998, after two and a half years of negotiations and the decline of Rede Manchete, TV Vitória became affiliated to Rede Record, which was expanding across the country.

== Technical information ==
Based on the federal decree transitioning Brazilian TV stations from analogue to digital signals, TV Vitória, as well as other stations in Vitória, ceased broadcasting on channel 06 VHF on October 25, 2017, following the official schedule of the ANATEL. The switch-off happened at 11:59 pm, during the airing of the Gugu program.

== Programming ==
As well as relaying Record's national programming, TV Vitória produces and airs the following programs:

- ES No Ar: news, with Eduardo Santos;
- Balanço Geral ES: news, with Michel Bermudes;
- Fala Espírito Santo: variety, with Roberta Salgueiro;
- Cidade Alerta ES: police news, with Fernando Fully;
- Jornal da TV Vitória: news, com Juliana Lyra;
- Balanço Geral ES Edição de Sábado: news, with Amaro Neto;
- Mais Doce: culinary competition, with Alessandro Eller;
- Chef de Família: culinary competition, with Alessandro Eller;
- Espirito Startups: program about startups;
