= TV Atalaia =

TV Atalaia (ZYP 305)
- Aracaju, Sergipe; Brazil
- Channels: Digital: 35 (UHF); Virtual: 8
- Branding: TV Atalaia

Programming
- Affiliations: Record

Ownership
- Owner: Sistema Atalaia de Comunicação; (Televisão Atalaia Ltda.)
- Sister stations: Transamérica Aracaju; NovaBrasil FM Aracaju; Cidade 99 FM

History
- Founded: 1972
- First air date: May 17, 1975
- Former call signs: ZYB 831 (1975-2018)
- Former channel numbers: Analog: 6 (VHF, 1975–2018)
- Former affiliations: Rede Tupi (1975-1980); Rede Bandeirantes (1980-1986); SBT (1986-2006)

Technical information
- Licensing authority: ANATEL
- ERP: 5 kW
- Transmitter coordinates: 10°53′38.5″S 37°3′34.6″W

Links
- Public license information: Profile
- Website: a8se.com/tv-atalaia

TV Atalaia (channel 6) is a Brazilian television station based in Aracaju, capital of the state of Sergipe, serving as an affiliate of the Record television network for the entire state. It is the flagship broadcast property of the locally based Sistema Atalaia de Comunicação, a company of Brazilian politician and businessman Walter Franco, alongside the radio stations Transamérica Aracaju, NovaBrasil FM Aracaju, Cidade 99 FM de Simão Dias and the A8 portal.

== History ==
TV Atalaia emerged as an initiative of the business group of the then senator Augusto Franco, which among other companies, had the former Rádio Atalaia (Aracaju), founded in 1969. In 1972, Atalaia won a competition opened by the Ministry of Communications and won the concession of Aracaju's second television channel, winning the proposals presented by radio stations Cultura (from the Archdiocese of Aracaju) and Liberdade (then belonging to former senator Albino Silva da Fonseca).

Work on assembling the structure and equipment of the station, which was then called TV 31 de Março, began in January 1974, on an old site close to Colina de Santo Antônio, one of the highest points in Aracaju, where it was built the transmission tower. Atalaia's plans were to go live, in an experimental phase, on October 19th of the same year. However, in the early hours of the 15th, a Tuesday, four days before the first broadcast, a fire started in the technical part and destroyed part of the equipment, in addition to the main studio. The cause, according to police investigations at the time, was a short circuit in the air conditioning system. The incident resulted in a loss of Cz$5 million (in values at the time) and completely delayed the station's assembly roadmap.

The struggle and efforts increased, until the broadcaster, now called TV Atalaia, was founded on May 17, 1975, as an affiliate of Rede Tupi. Channel 8 VHF in Aracaju initially designed test bars, when at noon on its founding date, a video appeared with radio host Carlos Mota introducing the station. It was the first TV in the North-Northeast to broadcast its programming entirely in color, and its equipment, purchased to replace what was destroyed in the fire the previous year, made TV Atalaia one of the most modern and well-equipped in the region.

When it went on air, after the celebration of a mass, it broadcast local programming that marked an era, such as Sábado Geral, which had prominent presenters such as Reinaldo Moura, Luiz Trindade, Hilton Lopes and João de Barros. Some of its main programs launched at this time were Reporter 8 and Nosso Mundo Infantil.

With the shutdown of Rede Tupi in 1980, the station began broadcasting Rede Bandeirantes programming. It was the first station in Sergipe to defend Diretas Já in 1984. In 1986, it left Rede Bandeirantes and became affiliated with SBT.

On June 28, 2006, representatives from TV Atalaia and Rede Record signed the affiliation contract, in a ceremony with a cocktail party held at the Quality Hotel, in Aracaju. On July 17, TV Atalaia began broadcasting Record programming, after 20 years as an affiliate of SBT.

The reason for the change to a new network is due to SBT's lack of dedication to journalism (already evident in recent years), the constant changes in schedules that harmed its programming, aggravated by the sudden change of the soap opera Rebelde to the same time as local television news, leading the broadcaster to decide not to renew the contract, when the station affiliated with Record. In the same week, TV Pajuçara in Maceió, Alagoas also left the network, on July 23.

On March 17, 2011, Aracaju's anniversary, the Atalaia Communication System brings news to the state: Atalaia FM is now called Megga FM and TV Atalaia debuts its new news program, Sergipe Notícias, shown on the mornings of both stations. On July 4, TV Atalaia premiered Grávidos, the first television series entirely recorded in the state, with 20 chapters. On September 5, the broadcaster relaunches the program Tudo a Ver Sergipe, a local version of the program of the same name shown by Record, the attraction combines journalism with entertainment through the best stories from TV Atalaia. One of the tables is similar to the national edition, the Top 10, this one with videos sent by viewers.

On May 17, 2012, the broadcaster celebrated its 37th anniversary and made changes to its news programs, removing the traditional news bench. On August 15, TV Atalaia opened the first branch of a television station in the state of Sergipe, in the city of Itabaiana.

In April 2014, the broadcaster decided to invest heavily in sports again. In this way, Atalaia Esporte debuted. The program is shown at noon and is presented by journalist Lílian Fonseca. With the change, Jornal do Estado 1st Edition started to be shown at quarter past noon. The broadcaster also made changes to the scenarios of all news programs. On December 23, the broadcaster closed the Itabaiana branch without further explanation. In December 2014, journalism director Eduardo do Valle left the station. Journalist Marcos Cardoso took over the post, but didn't stay for long. Journalist Eduardo Andrade held the position for a few months, but in May 2016, journalist Eduardo do Valle returned to command the journalism department. The broadcaster launched the local version of Balanço Geral under the command of Claudio Luis.

On June 15, 2015, the broadcaster launched the local version of the Cidade Alerta program, led by Gilmar Carvalho. After 1 month of renovation, on October 5th, TV Atalaia debuts a new fixed setting for the house's programs, consisting of a touch screen, video wall and a screen that changes from program to program, generally varying photos of the city of Aracaju is another new exclusive for the Você em Dia program, with decoration aimed at the living room of a house and with a great view of the garden. On this day, all of the house's programs gained new graphics, except for the programs Balanço Geral Sergipe and Cidade Alerta Sergipe, which follow a look standardized by Record. The A8SE Portal was also completely remodeled, even closer to the standards of the R7 portal.

In January 2016, the station announced the purchase of the broadcasting rights for the 2016 Sergipano Football Championship and that it will show one game per round every Saturday afternoon. On February 15, TV Atalaia changes its programming with the departure of the A8 program on TV without any explanation. Some programs that were outsourced and occupied the Saturday schedule were also removed. G2PTV's Game Quiz Show is being shown at the location of these programs, from 2pm to 2:45pm. On that same day, Priscila Andrade took over Balanço Geral SE, former presenter Evenilson Santana returned to being a reporter by decision of the station's management and Candisse Matos officially took over Jornal do Estado 1st Edition. Zero Tolerância gained a new visual package and a reduction in program time, until two in the afternoon, which in the future could harm the audience at that time. In July 2016, the station definitively removed G2PTV's independent production from the air, and the Zero Tolerance program resumed its normal schedule from Monday to Friday.

In May, journalist Lílian Fonseca, who ran Atalaia Esporte, was dismissed from the broadcaster, later moving to Esporte Interativo. Rafaella Oliveira takes over the sports program. The following month, journalist Amália Roeder, who presented 'Jornal do Estado 2nd Edition with Gilvan Fontes, took charge of Jornal do Estado 1st Edition, until August 19th. On August 22, the broadcaster made small changes to the programs. In the morning, the Balanço Geral SE was renamed Balanço Geral Manhã. Jornal do Estado 1st edition leaves the program and is replaced by Balanço Geral SE, presented by Tiago Hélcias and with comments from the public security consultant, military police officer Coronel Maurício Iunes. On August 28th, Burburinho debuts, an entertainment program that mixes music, lifestyle, gastronomy, health and a multitude of varieties and is presented by journalists: Thayssa Bezerra, Sol Meneghini, Jéssica Lieko and Marcelo Efron.

On March 20, 2018, the broadcaster canceled TV Atalaia Entrevista, after its presenter, Carlos Batalha, reported false news about councilwoman Marielle Franco, shot dead in Rio de Janeiro, a week earlier. On March 29, the last edition of Boa Noite Sergipe, led by Tamires Franci, airs. The news program is closed, giving more space to Cidade Alerta Sergipe, which now has a full hour. On April 2, the morning news program SE No Ar debuts, with Tamires Franci.

== Technical information ==
Virtual channel	Digital channel	Screen	Content
8.1	35 UHF	1080i	TV Atalaia/Record's main schedule

The station began its digital transmissions on January 22, 2009, through channel 35 UHF, being the first broadcaster in Sergipe and also the first Rede Record affiliate to operate the new technology. A ceremony was organized in the presence of the station's owner, Walter Franco, the state governor, Marcelo Déda, and the mayor of Aracaju, Edvaldo Nogueira. On March 1, 2010, the station's programs and news began to be produced in high definition.

=== Analog-to-digital conversion ===
Based on the federal decree transitioning Brazilian TV stations from analog to digital signals, TV Atalaia, as well as the other stations in Aracaju, ceased broadcasting on VHF channel 8 on May 30, 2018, following the official schedule of the ANATEL.

== Programs ==
Besides relaying Record's national programming, TV Atalaia produces and airs the following programs:

- Nova Manhã na TV: Newscast from Nova Brasil FM Aracaju, with Jéssika Cruz and Sérgio Cursino;
- Balanço Geral SE Manhã: Local edition of Balanço Geral, with Tamires Franci;
- Balanço Geral SE: Main local edition of Balanço Geral, with Sérgio Cursino;
- Tolerância Zero: Police news, with Claudio Luis;
- Você em Dia: Variety talk show, with Jaquelline Cruz;
- Cidade Alerta Sergipe: Local edition of Cidade Alerta, with Mariana Sena;
- Jornal do Estado: Main news, with Gilvan Fontes;
- Balanço Geral Edição de Sábado: Saturday edition of Balanço Geral, with rotating presenters;
- Além da Camisa: Sports news, with Jamile Pavlova;
- Mora Sergipe: Real estate program, with Talita Alves;
- Canal Elétrico: Musical program, with Fabiano Oliveira;
- Programa Thais Bezerra: Social column, with Thais Bezerra;
- Batalha na TV: Interview program, with Carlos Batalha.

The following programs aired in the past and were discontinued:

- A Tribuna do Povo
- A8 na TV
- Agro Atalaia
- Atalaia Esporte
- Atalaia nos Esportes
- Atalaia Show
- Blá Blá Tivi
- Boa Noite Sergipe
- Burburinho
- Domingo Rural
- Esporte 8
- Esporte Agora
- Fala Cidadão
- Fala Consumidor
- Fala Sergipe
- Gente da Comunidade
- Jornal Bandeirantes - Edição local
- Jornal da Cidade
- Nosso Mundo Infantil
- Programa Hilton Lopes
- Programa Tudo
- Repórter 8
- Sabadão do Bareta
- Sábado Geral
- SBT Sergipe
- SE no Ar
- Sergipe Notícias
- Sergipe que a Gente Ama
- Show do Bareta
- Telejornal Bancest
- TJ Cidade
- TJ Sergipe
- TV Atalaia Entrevista
- Tudo a Ver Sergipe
- Você Vahle
- 1, 2, 3 & Laura
- Rebobinando

=== Special broadcasts ===
==== Pré-Caju ====
The station also broadcast the carnival preview that took place in January.

In 2010, the station had yet another resource to broadcast the event: a helicopter, which was used to obtain better images of the event.

==== Miss Sergipe ====
On March 20, 2010, TV Atalaia sponsored and covered the Miss Sergipe 2010 contest. The coverage was so positive that many viewers hope that Miss Sergipe will be broadcast live in 2011.

==== Fest Verão Sergipe ====
TV Atalaia exclusively broadcast Fest Verão Sergipe 2016 live on January 23rd and 24th (Friday and Saturday, respectively). The broadcast was completely in high definition and was considered by most of the population to be a show. In the weeks leading up to the festival, the broadcaster aired the program O Melhor do Verão with the businessman who created the party, Fabiano Oliveira.
