= 1961 in Brazil =

Events in the year 1961 in Brazil.

== Incumbents ==
=== Federal government ===
- President:
  - Juscelino Kubitschek (until 30 January)
  - Jânio Quadros (from 31 January to 25 August)
  - Ranieri Mazzilli (from 25 August to September 7)
  - João Goulart (starting September 7)
- Prime Minister: Tancredo Neves (starting 8 September)
- Vice President:
  - João Goulart (until 25 August)
  - Vacant (from August 25)

=== Governors ===
- Alagoas:
  - Sebastião Muniz Falcão (until 31 January)
  - Luis Cavalcante (from 31 January)
- Amazonas: Gilberto Mestrinho
- Bahia: Juracy Magalhães
- Ceará: Parsifal Barroso
- Espírito Santo:Raul Giuberti
- Goiás:
  - José Feliciano Ferreira (until 31 January)
  - Mauro Borges (from 31 January)
- Guanabara: Carlos Lacerda
- Maranhão: Newton de Barros Belo (from 31 January)
- Mato Grosso:
  - João Ponce de Arruda (until 31 January)
  - Fernando Corrêa da Costa (from 31 January)
- Minas Gerais:
  - José Francisco Bias Fortes (until 31 January)
  - José de Magalhães Pinto (from 31 January)
- Pará:
  - Luís de Moura Carvalho (until 31 January)
  - Aurélio do Carmo (from 31 January)
- Paraíba:
  - José Fernandes de Lima (until 31 January)
  - Pedro Gondim (from 31 January)
- Paraná:
  - Moisés Lupion (until 31 January)
  - Nei Braga (from 31 January)
- Pernambuco: Cid Sampaio
- Piauí: Chagas Rodrigues
- Rio de Janeiro:
  - Roberto Silveira (until 28 February)
  - Celso Peçanha (from 28 February)
- Rio Grande do Norte:
  - Dinarte de Medeiros Mariz (until 31 January)
  - Aluízio Alves (from 31 January)
- Rio Grande do Sul: Leonel Brizola
- Santa Catarina:
  - Heriberto Hülse (until 31 January)
  - Celso Ramos (from 31 January)
- São Paulo: Carlos Alberto Alves de Carvalho Pinto
- Sergipe: Luís Garcia

=== Vice governors ===
- Alagoas:
  - Sizenando Nabuco de Melo (until 31 January)
  - Teotônio Brandão Vilela (from 31 January)
- Bahia: Orlando Moscoso
- Ceará: Wilson Gonçalves
- Espírito Santo: Raul Giuberti
- Goiás:
  - João de Abreu (until 31 January)
  - Antônio Rezende Monteiro (from 31 January)
- Maranhão:
  - Alexandre Alves Costa (until 31 January)
  - Alfredo Salim Duailibe (from 31 January)
- Mato Grosso:
  - Henrique José Vieira Neto (until 31 January)
  - Jose Garcia Neto (from 31 January)
- Minas Gerais:
  - Artur Bernardes Filho (until 31 January)
  - Clóvis Salgado da Gama (from 31 January)
- Pará: Newton Burlamaqui de Miranda (from 31 January)
- Paraíba:
  - Pedro Gondim (until 31 January)
  - André Avelino de Paiva Gadelha (from 31 January)
- Pernambuco: Pelópidas da Silveira
- Piauí: Tibério Nunes
- Rio de Janeiro:
  - Celso Peçanha (until 1 March)
  - Vacant thereafter (from 31 January)
- Rio Grande do Norte:
  - José Augusto Varela (until 31 January)
  - Walfredo Gurgel (from 31 January)
- Santa Catarina: Armindo Marcílio Doutel de Andrade (from 31 January)
- São Paulo: Porfírio da Paz
- Sergipe: Dionísio Machado

== Events ==
=== January ===
- January 31: Jânio Quadros becomes the 22nd President of Brazil, succeeding Juscelino Kubitschek.

=== August ===
- August 25-September 7: The Legality Campaign takes place, which aims to defend the inauguration of João Goulart as President of Brazil.
- August 25: Jânio Quadros resigns as President of the Republic. The President of the Chamber of Deputies, Ranieri Mazzilli, takes over as the 23rd President of Brazil on an interim basis.

=== September ===
- September 2: The National Congress of Brazil approves Constitutional Amendment No. 4, which establishes parliamentarism.
- September 7: João Goulart is sworn in as the 24th President of Brazil.
- September 8: The National Congress of Brazil approves the constitution of the first Council of Ministers.

=== November ===
- November 1: A Panair do Brasil plane crashes near Recife airport, leaving 45 dead and 43 injured.
- November 23: Brazil restores diplomatic relations with the Soviet Union, 14 years after their breakup.

=== December ===
- December 17: An arson fire at the Niterói circus, kills more than 300 people and becomes the worst fire disaster in Brazilian history.
- December 20: Adilson Marcelino Alves, known as Dequinha, is arrested by the Rio de Janeiro police and confesses to being responsible for the fire at the Niterói circus.

== Births ==
=== January ===
- January 1 – Rita Camata, politician and journalist

=== March ===
- 7 March – Miguel Nicolelis, scientist

=== September ===
- 8 September – Fernanda Abreu, singer

== Deaths ==
=== April ===
- April 25 – Borges de Medeiros, lawyer and politician (born 1863)

=== June ===
- June 22 – José de Mesquita (born 1892)

=== December ===
- 31 December – Péricles, cartoonist (born 1924)

== See also ==
- 1961 in Brazilian television
