= RPC Londrina =

RPC Londrina (ZYB 392)
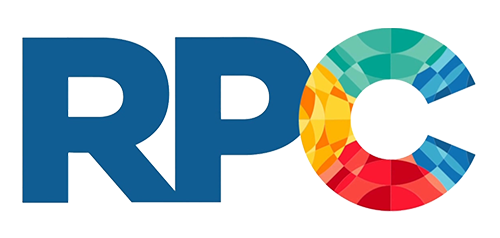
- Londrina, Paraná; Brazil
- Channels: Digital: 42 (UHF); Virtual: 3
- Branding: RPC

Programming
- Affiliations: TV Globo

Ownership
- Owner: Grupo Paraense de Comunicação; (Sociedade Rádio Emissora Paranaense S.A.)

History
- First air date: September 21, 1963
- Former call signs: ZYE 88
- Former names: TV Coroados (1963-2000); RPC TV Coroados (2000-2009); RPC TV Londrina (2009-2014)
- Former channel numbers: Analog: 3 (VHF, 1963-2018)
- Former affiliations: Rede Tupi (1963-1973); Rede Globo (1973-1979); Independent (1979)

Technical information
- Licensing authority: ANATEL
- ERP: 4.1 kW
- Transmitter coordinates: 23°17′59.1″S 51°11′11.4″W

Links
- Public license information: Profile
- Website: redeglobo.globo.com/RPC

RPC Londrina (channel 12) is a Brazilian television station licensed to Londrina, Paraná, Brazil, affiliated with TV Globo. The station is part of RPC and its signal covers 52 municipalities in the northeast of the state.

== History ==
In August 1959, Brazilian television was only 9 years old and Assis Chateaubriand was already planning to build the first television station in the interior of the country in Londrina. Chateaubriand, director-president of Diários e Emissoras Associadas, came to Londrina at the invitation of Horácio Coimbra (at the time director of Companhia Cacique de Café Solúvel) and was categorical when he arrived in the city, in his own words: "I'm going to install here, the first television in the interior of the country".

The project was conceived on October 31, when the company's Constitution Assembly, then called Rádio Televisão Coroados S/A, was held. The name “Coroados” was chosen to honor the Kaingang Indians who occupied the region where the city of Londrina was built.

Its objective was the "establishment of radio and television broadcasting services, in all forms", with share capital worth CR$500,000.00 (five hundred thousand cruzeiros). The first board of directors was made up of Edmundo Monteiro (presidential director) and Adherbal Stresser (superintendent director), the supervisory board had Américo Palhares; Renato Lombardi and Benedito Santos, the substitutes were Osório Monteiro; Godofredo Amaral Penteado and Joaquim de Mattos Gurgel. Founding shareholders: Francisco de Assis Chateaubriand Bandeira de Melo, Edmundo Monteiro, Armando Simoni Pereira, Armando Oliveira, Horácio Sabino Coimbra, Hélio Dias de Moura, Adherbal Stresser, Ronald Sanson Stresser, Alberto Maluf and José Paranhos do Rio Branco, five hundred shares worth nominal value of CR$1,000.00. Assis Chateaubriand had three hundred shares and the others, twenty-five each.

The idea, considered unrealistic by many at the time, took no more than three years to come to fruition. José Arrabal, who later became the first director of TV Coroados, chose the land where the broadcaster is still located today, Avenida Tiradentes. The official launch of the project took place on January 20, 1960, at the Hotel Monções, in Londrina. Among those present was Mr. José Arrabal, the first commercial and general director of Coroados.

The bureaucratic part was ready, it was time to leave the drawing board and get to work. The station's facilities should be housed in its own building, for the project it was decided that no improvisations and adaptations would be made as had occurred in other stations. The location chosen is the station's headquarters to this day, Avenida Tiradentes, which at the time was full of coffee plantations and still had few buildings. The TV director, Ronald Sanson Stresser, was in charge of building and assembling the station. Ronald also directed the station, together with his father, journalist Adherbal Stresser. The construction was divided into two flights of one and two floors. The first housed the administration, auxiliary services and common studio. The second consisted of the main studio, intended for large installations and the auditorium, dressing rooms and technical area. It was in the main studio that the live programs that marked the history of TV Coroados took place. The initial reach would be the north of Paraná and the south of São Paulo, with special income between Cornélio Procópio and Maringá.

The inauguration of TV Coroados took place on September 21, 1963, when the station's first images were aired at 6pm on channel 3 in Londrina. Initially, a film was shown with images of the inauguration.

Assis Chateaubriand was unable to attend the inauguration, but Archbishop D. Geraldo Fernandes was present, who shortly afterwards would have a weekly program, "A Voz do Pastor"; the city mayor Milton Menezes; the broadcaster's directors; among other local personalities.

When it opened, TV Coroados had already been on air for more than a month, on an experimental basis, showing films and musical content. On the opening day, the first program went on air at 6pm. Hours earlier, precisely at 10:50 am, the then mayor of Londrina, Milton Menezes, unveiled a bronze plaque in the TV's entrance hall, in honor of Francisco de Assis Chateaubriand Bandeira de Melo, founder of the station, which had become one of the first broadcasters of television in the interior of Brazil. The debut of TV ended up attracting many people interested in auditioning to participate in the programs. At the time, commercials were made live in studios and everyone dreamed of becoming an artist.

The inauguration was highlighted on the main page of the newspaper Folha de Londrina the following day, September 22, one of the biggest incentives for the installation of the TV station in the city.

After being inaugurated and the first years of its existence, TV Coroados went through several phases, remaining as an owned-and-operated station of Rede Tupi, showing the network's recorded programming through trips from São Paulo and Curitiba to Londrina (as at the time there was no signal by microwave or satellite) and was owned by Diários Associados.

The image on Channel 3, being very good, was captured far from Londrina. One of the cities that received signal, Maringá (more than 90 kilometers by road from Londrina-Maringá), now had a repeater in the city, through channel 6, covering the western part of channel 3's signal, which also received channel 6 to the east.

After the installation of the Channel 6 retransmitter in Maringá, another was installed in Nova Esperança, which received a signal from Channel 6; after the installation of the Nova Esperança retransmitter, another was installed in the district of Sumaré, in the municipality of Paranavaí. The district of Sumaré in Paranavaí was 167 kilometers from Londrina.

Other TV Coroados retransmitters emerged later, but with precarious signals, covering the north of Paraná, becoming the only TV station in the north and northwest regions of the state. There was generally equipment to retransmit only one channel on each repeater.

In 1969, the same repeater system carried out by TV Coroados was carried out by Rede Excelsior (TV Excelsior, Channel 9 in São Paulo) at the end of the 60s in the north of Paraná, through the repeater in Cornélio Procópio, then another in Apucarana, which carried the signal precariously to Maringá, ending the monopoly of TV Coroados in the region.

In the same year, TV Tibagi, Channel 11 in Apucarana, was created, belonging to the then governor of the State, Paulo Pimentel, who had TV Iguaçu in Curitiba. When Excelsior's Channel 9 was revoked and closed in 1970, the retransmission became TV Globo's programming. At the end of the 1960s, its signal was repeated as far as Assis in the State of São Paulo, on the initiative of a family from that city.

Starting in the 70s, TV Tibagi, until then restricted to Apucarana and the region, became its main competitor: With more investments, programming, the signal with better distribution from Apucarana (known as the "upper city").

As a result, TV Tibagi was better than TV Coroados, taking it away from the audience, using the same repeater system carried out by TVs Coroados and Excelsior. Retransmitters in more distant cities started to retransmit TV Tibagi, reducing the coverage area of TV Coroados.

At the same time, with the strengthening of local broadcasters, which retransmitted the same network programming, receiving a direct signal from São Paulo no longer made sense in the north and northwest of Paraná.

In 1973, TV Coroados was sold to businessman Paulo Pimentel, becoming part of the Paulo Pimentel Group and becoming an affiliate of TV Globo. In May 1976, amidst the political persecution of the military dictatorship, which also caused him financial losses, Pimentel was forced to save money by selling TV Coroados to Oscar Martinez. During the share exchange, between April 26 and May 7, the broadcaster was temporarily unable to retransmit Globo's programming. On March 10, 1979, 5 days before the creation of the then-sister TV Tropical, which led to Globo's affiliation, while TV Coroados began showing film-based programming as an independent station. In October 1979, the station was sold to Grupo Paranaense de Comunicação and became an affiliate of the network again on November 2. For a few weeks, the two stations retransmitted Globo, but on December 1, channel 7 became affiliated with Rede Bandeirantes.

In the years that followed, through retransmitters, the signal reached 52 municipalities in the north of the state, reaching almost 1 million and 500 thousand viewers and the broadcaster's programming and newscasts underwent several changes.

After this occasion, TV Coroados changed its name to RPC TV Coroados and retransmitted TV Globo programming, remaining as the audience leader ever since.

On August 20, 2018, Paraná TV 1st and 2nd editions were renamed Meio Dia Paraná and Boa Noite Paraná in a way of getting closer to viewers in the region.

== Programming ==
Aside from relaying Globo's national programming and RPC's statewide output, RPC Londrina produces local editions of its newscasts:

- Bom Dia Paraná
- Meio Dia Paraná
- Boa Noite Paraná

== Technical information ==
=== Subchannels ===
Channel	Video	Aspect	Short name	Programming
3.1	1080i	16:9	RPC TV	Main RPC programming / TV Globo

On February 25, 2010, the broadcaster put the digital signal on air, the first broadcaster in the interior of Paraná.

On December 16, 2013, news programs and reports produced by RPC Londrina began to be shown on HDTV, being the first station in the interior of Paraná to carry out such a procedure.

=== Analog-to-digital conversion ===
On November 28, 2018, RPC Londrina discontinued its analog signal on VHF channel 3 complying an order by ANATEL regarding the shutdown of analog television in Londrina.
