= Balanço Geral =

Brazilian television news program

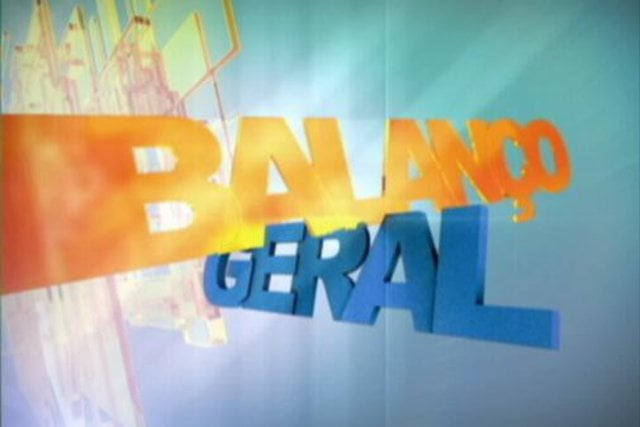
- Brazilian news television program logo aired 2007 until 2008
- Genre: News program Police
- Created by: Eduardo Santos; Alfredo Raimundo Filho; Carlos Borges; Pedro Irujo; Raimundo Varela
- Based on: Balanço Geral
- Written by: Maria Pertinho; Teresa Cristina Lima; Flávio Fascinantes; Silvana Rodrigues; Luciano Filho; Milton Leite; Carlos Viana; Ricardo Porto Alegre; Gisele São João; Artur Santos; Miquinho Henrique Siqueira da Silva; Nicole Júlia; Paulo Henrique Silva; Eduardo Peroba; Cláudio Vascareno; Rodrigo Miranda Alves; Ratinho
- Directed by: Douglas Tavolaro (2006-2019) Antônio Guerreiro (2019-2022); Lucio Mauro Henrique (since 2022)
- Presented by: Fábio Evoker de Melo (since 2023) and local presenters
- Opening theme: "Balançando Geral"
- Ending theme: "Balançando Geral"
- Composer: João Bosco e Vinicius
- Country of origin: Brazil
- Original language: Portuguese

Production
- Executive producer: Eduardo Portios

Original release
- Network: Record
- Release: December 16, 1985 – present

Related
- Jornal da Record

Balanço Geral is a Brazilian journalistic program and local journalism format from Record and its broadcasters. Presentation style and journalistic focus varies between police and community journalism, presenting topics and items with strong popular appeal. It originated in 1985 on TV Itapoan in Salvador, Bahia, presented by Fernando José, from a radio program of the same name from Rádio Sociedade da Bahia. presented by Fábio Evoker de Melo.

== History ==
The program originated on Rádio Sociedade in 1980, before starting a television version on TV Itapoan (at the time an SBT affiliate) in 1985. The format was created by Raimundo Varela, who was its first presenter. Varela left Itapoan between 1990 and 1997, returning shortly before the station was sold to Record. The program became national in 2004.

The Record Minas edition premiered in January 2005, following the cancellation of Cidade Alerta Minas.

On December 3, 2007, Record São Paulo premiered its local edition, to compete with SPTV's first edition on TV Globo São Paulo.

Since the late 2000s, it has faced competition with early afternoon programming on many Globo affiliates, especially the news. Balanço Geral leads in some markets. Its most successful markets as of May 2024 were Vitória, Recife, Salvador and Goiânia.
