= TV Marajoara =

Defunct television station in Belém, Pará, Brazil

TV Marajoara (ZYB 309)
- Belém, Pará; Brazil
- Channels: Analog: 2 (VHF)

Programming
- Affiliations: Rede Tupi

Ownership
- Owner: Diários Associados

History
- First air date: September 30, 1961
- Last air date: July 18, 1980

Technical information
- Licensing authority: DENTEL

TV Marajoara was a Brazilian television station based in Belém, capital of the state of Pará. It operated on VHF channel 2 and was an owned-and-operated station of Rede Tupi. Founded in 1961 as the first television station in the state, the station ceased broadcasting in 1980 due to the revocation of the station's concession due to the Diários Associados crisis.

== History ==
TV Marajoara was inaugurated on September 30, 1961, as the first television station in the state of Pará and the first in the North of Brazil, in addition to being the 12th broadcaster owned by the Rede de Emissoras Associadas, which that same month it had also opened its owned-and-operated stations in Goiânia and Vitória. Like these two stations, channel 2 did not have a concession to operate, and its situation was regularized in a decree signed by Prime Minister Tancredo Neves, on March 15, 1962.

At the beginning, TV Marajoara had a vast local program offer, which included news programs, talk shows and telenovelas produced in its studios and at Teatro da Paz, in the city center. Canned imported content such as films, cartoons and series sent by plane by TV Tupi São Paulo also completed the schedule. With just a few days on air, it was also responsible for carrying out its first live outside broadcast, with coverage of Círio de Nazaré.

With the advent of satellite transmissions, local programming was being replaced by the network retransmission of Rede Tupi programs, and the number of employees was gradually reduced. Competition also intensified with the arrival of TV Guajará in 1967, and TV Liberal in 1976.

Although it was financially healthy, TV Marajoara and six other Rede Tupi stations had their concessions revoked on July 18, 1980, due to debts with social security and financial corruption of Diários Associados, which had been involved in a financial crisis since the death of Assis Chateaubriand in 1968. The station aired its signal for the last time until the early hours of that day, when it ended its programming after showing the film Tempos Difíceis, at 12:17 am. During the morning, a DENTEL technician appeared at 9:20 am to seal the station's transmitters, before it was scheduled to sign on.

=== Aftermath ===
The day after the closure of TV Marajoara, the stations's 96 employees sent a petition to Brasília asking for a re-examination of the government's decision and declaring that the station was up to date with salaries, pensions, FGTS and other taxes. However, the decision was not reversed. On July 23, the Federal Government opened a public competition for the revoked TV concessions. The Silvio Santos Group acquired five concessions, including channel 2 VHF in Belém, which during the implementation process had its concession changed to channel 5 VHF. On September 2, 1981, TVS Belém (now SBT Pará) went on air, Channel 2 was later used by TV Cultura do Pará in 1987.

In 1982, the owner of TV Guajará, Lopo de Castro Júnior, purchased the old TV Marajoara studios that were located on Avenida São Jerônimo (currently Avenida Governador José Malcher), to serve as the new headquarters of channel 4 and radio stations Guajará AM and FM. The broadcaster even built a new 105-meter-high metal tower, replacing the old concrete tower that had been condemned and demolished due to structural problems. Channel 4 used the facilities until 1997, when Rede Boas Novas, which bought TV Guajará in 1995, moved its headquarters to the Theological Seminary of the Assembly of God (SETAD), in Marco. Currently, the building is used by a unit of Colégio Integrado, while the transmission tower is operated by TV Grão Pará.

TV Marajoara's image collection was passed on to TV Guajará, and part of it, to save costs, ended up having the tapes reused to record new content, according to the station's former director, José Paulo Costa. When TV Guajará was sold to Boas Novas in 1995, these tapes were donated, along with other historical equipment from both broadcasters, to the Museu da Imagem e do Som do Pará. Another part of the collection was in the possession of Diários Associados, and ended up being lost in the 1990s along with photo files and copies of the newspaper A Província do Pará when the group disbanded the periodical.
