= TV Tupi Rio de Janeiro =

TV Tupi Rio de Janeiro (ZYB 513)
- Rio de Janeiro; Brazil
- Channels: Analog: 6 (VHF)

Programming
- Affiliations: Rede Tupi

Ownership
- Owner: Diários Associados

History
- First air date: January 20, 1951
- Last air date: July 18, 1980
- Former call signs: PRG-3 TV (1951-1970)

Technical information
- Licensing authority: DENTEL

TV Tupi Rio de Janeiro was a Brazilian television station based in the city of Rio de Janeiro, the capital of the state with the same name. It operated on VHF channel 6 and was owned by Rede Tupi throughout its existence. It was the second television station to launch in Brazil, following TV Tupi São Paulo, which would soon form part of Rede Tupi.

== History ==
As early as July 1944, Assis Chateaubriand held discussions with RCA executives David Sarnoff and Vladimir Zworykin, where he insisted that his conglomerate should establish two television stations, one in São Paulo and the other in Rio de Janeiro.

On January 27, 1948, the Diário da Noite reported the imminent arrival of television in both Rio de Janeiro and São Paulo. Camera tests for the station began in April 1950.

Experimental broadcasts commenced on October 5, 1950, under the callsign PRG-3. The station officially signed on for the first time on January 20, 1951, a week before its license was granted.

The launch day solemnities took place atop Sugarloaf Mountain, starting at noon, reaching out to approximately 5,000 television sets installed in the area. Following the inauguration, a series of speeches were delivered. After the ceremony, the station displayed its test pattern until 8:30 pm, when Luiz Jatobá introduced the upcoming programming. This was followed by a concert from Orquestra Tabajara featuring Brazilian music. At 9 pm, Calouros em Desfile, presented by Ary Barroso, aired, followed by a special show at 9:30 pm, Tupi e a Televisão. This program featured several popular celebrities of the time, including comedian Mazzaropi, who had attended the launch of the São Paulo station, becoming the first person to appear at two station launches. At 10:30 pm, a special edition of Telejornal was broadcast, featuring a film about the station's launch and a report on the ceremony. The evening ended with a jiu-jitsu match between Hélio and Carlos Gracie. TV Tupi Rio operated with a 5KW transmitter, covering the entire city as well as the nearby towns of Niterói and Petrópolis.

In late 1951, the station broadcast the Brazilian telenovela Sua Vida Me Pertence (Your Life Belongs to Me), which featured the first televised kiss on February 8, 1952.

On April 1, 1968, the Spanish company Movierecord secured a two-hour programming slot for its Latin American Ola Vision project.
