= Rede Brasil de Televisão =

Brazilian television network

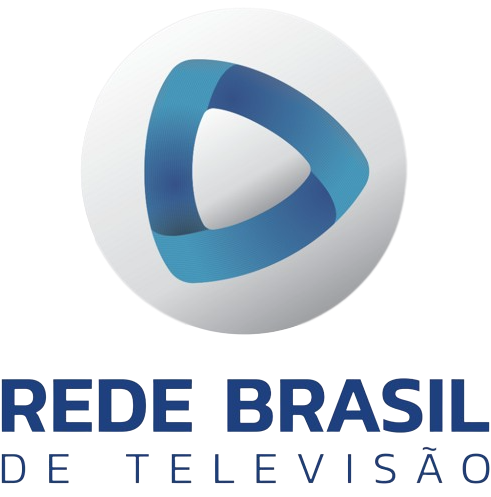
- Country: Brazil
- Broadcast area: Brazil
- Headquarters: São Paulo, São Paulo, Brazil

Programming
- Language: Portuguese
- Picture format: 480p (SDTV); 1080i (HDTV)

Ownership
- Owner: Marcos Tolentino

History
- Launched: April 7, 2007

Links
- Website: rbtv.com.br

Availability

Streaming media
- Rede Brasil de Televisão: Watch live

Rede Brasil de Televisão (Brazil Television Network, also known as Rede Brasil or RBTV) is a Brazilian television network headquartered in the city of Campo Grande, Mato Grosso do Sul. The network first aired in April 2007 and has its studios in the city of São Paulo, São Paulo. Its network is administered by Marcos Tolentino da Silva.

Since its foundation, RBTV has a growing number of Brazilian municipalities receiving its signal, with 512 municipalities having the option to watch RBTV.

Rede Brazil is a television station that has a wide variety of segments on its programming.

== History ==
The station went on the air on April 7, 2007. Until then, the station had been gradually putting together its programming and, as a result, rebroadcast some programs from educational networks such as TV Brasil and TV Escola. In September 2007, Rede Brasil featured programs such as Conceição, Forno & Fogão, Nei & Nani (inherited from the now-defunct TVJB), the movie block Cine Rede Brasil and cartoons and series such as Saint Seiya, Bewitched, Bonanza, Lois & Clark: The New Adventures of Superman and Mission: Impossible. Starting in 2008, the network began producing its own programming, adding more shows, series, and movies.

The channel received its first warning in August 2009 from the APCM (Associação Antipirataria de Cinema e Música) and representatives of 20th Century Fox, over the illegal broadcast of certain television series. Rede Brasil claimed that it received series and films from E+ Entretenimento, who also sold series and films to NGT, as well as airing DVD copies of television series to local channels (E+ in its turn said that they had the rights to the series claiming that they bought the rights from an offshore in the Virgin Islands). Although at the time dozens of local television channels were airing foreign television series in an illegal scheme, only Rede Brasil was notified and removed the series from its schedule.

On September 5, 2012, the channel started digital broadcasts on virtual channel 56.1 in São Paulo (physical channel 10), and started HD broadcasts in 2014 on both terrestrial and subscription television.

In April 2013, Rede Brasil aired the anime Saint Seiya without holding the rights to distribute or broadcast it. The series was legally aired by Rede Bandeirantes, which held the distribution rights from PlayArte. PlayArte, the holder of the series’ broadcast rights, stated that it would take legal action against Rede Brasil. Rede Bandeirantes, the legal holder of the anime’s broadcast rights, did not comment on the matter.

The first anime to be included in Rede Brasil’s schedule was Saint Seiya, which had previously aired on the network from September 2007 through 2010 and resumed airing on April 2, 2013. In less than a month, RBTV removed the anime from its schedule. However, three years later, the channel announced the return of Saint Seiya following a legal contract with Toei Animation.

In June 2016, because the station’s owner, Marcos Tolentino, was a friend and business partner of Celso Russomanno at the companies Paz and Bell Hel—which were under investigation as part of the Federal Police’s Operation Ararath—a court order was issued to remove the station’s directors. The order required Fernando Claro Iglesias, a court-appointed administrator, to take over management of the company. A search and seizure of documents from the company’s archives was also ordered. Rede Brasil de Televisão issued a statement clarifying that it had taken legal measures, providing guarantees and making payments, thereby preventing the intervention from taking effect. It also stated that the court had been misled by the allegations of the defense team for the production company Paparazzi de Comunicações, which was responsible for paying the fine.

== RBPlay ==
In November 2022, Rede Brasil launched RBPLAY, a free streaming application, containing all of the broadcaster's programming.
