= Rede Tupi =

Former Brazilian broadcast television network

- Logo used from 1978 to 1980
- Type: Television network
- Country: Brazil
- Affiliates: see Regional stations
- Headquarters: São Paulo; Rio de Janeiro

Programming
- Language: Portuguese

Ownership
- Owner: Diários Associados
- Parent: Diários Associados (Radiodifusora de São Paulo)

History
- Founded: 18 September 1950
- Launched: 18 September 1950
- Founder: Assis Chateaubriand
- Closed: 18 July 1980 (29 years and 10 months)

Rede Tupi (Portuguese pronunciation: [ˈʁedʒi tuˈpi]; in English, Tupi Network) was a Brazilian commercial terrestrial television network. Its flagship station, located in the city of São Paulo, was the first TV station to operate in the country, being inaugurated on 18 September 1950 by journalist Assis Chateaubriand. It was owned by Diários Associados, one of the largest media conglomerates of the 20th century, owner of several newspapers, magazines, and radio stations.

Named after the Tupiniquim tribe in Brazil, Rede Tupi was a pioneer in television programming in South America, setting the tone for the best telenovelas, news programming, sports, and entertainment in the 1950s and 1960s, such as TV de Vanguarda (Vanguard TV), O Repórter Esso (The Esso Reporter), Alô Doçura, Clube dos Artistas (1952–80), Beto Rockfeller, O Mundo é das Mulheres (The World is for Women) and many more. It led the way for the establishment of television stations throughout Brazil, and in 1960, beat other stations in broadcasting via satellite (the first Brazilian TV network to achieve such a feat) in honor of the formal opening of Brasilia.

Its success prompted other nations in the continent to have television stations. The network added new talent to Brazilian show business, which was then a thriving industry depending on films and radio. During the 1960s, its programs revolutionized television through animation, humor, comedy and children's shows plus the telenovelas that gave rise to the launch in 1965 of its rival network in Rio de Janeiro, Rede Globo.

The network was formed in 1977, with members as co-brothers of the Diários Associados and affiliates. Its flagships were TV Tupi São Paulo and TV Tupi Rio de Janeiro. Due to a history of management problems, which resulted in a financial crisis, Tupi had part of its licenses revoked by the Government of Brazil in 18 July 1980, shutting down the network. The station's assets were acquired by the Silvio Santos Group (owner of SBT), by the Bloch Group (owner of Rede Manchete, which would be extinguished in 1999 and would have its concessions acquired by RedeTV!) and by the Grupo Abril (which would operate MTV Brasil from 1991 to 2017, replacing it with Ideal TV and then selling its concession in 2015 to Spring Comunicação, which would found Loading in 2020, but had the sale of the concession annulled in 2021 and later revoked in 2023, which culminated in the return of Ideal TV in its place).

== History ==
=== 1930s and 40s: build-up ===
In 1938, RCA set up a stand at its headquarters in New York, featuring a complete system for television transmission and reception. The aim was to show interest in the new technology not only in the USA, but also abroad. One of the foreign invitees was Diários Associados, who went to New York to represent the company was its director at the time, Dário de Almeida Magalhães. Upon returning, he wrote in an editorial at the group's main newspaper of the time, O Jornal do Rio de Janeiro, about the experiment. The first television demonstration was held on June 3, 1939 with the help of the German company Telefunken but without the direct involvement of Diários Associados.

In July 1944, Chateaubriand visited the United States, a country he hadn't visited until then. One of the aims of the trip was to talk with David Sarnoff, who had prepared a stand showing the advances in radio and television in the world, something that, especially for radio, would be beneficial in the post-war world, perfecting the existing technology. One of the people present was Vladimir Zworykin, who answered some of Chateaubriand's questions, and demanded Sarnoff to build licenses for the first television stations in the Americas outside of the USA. Chateaubriand's ambitions were to build two television stations, one in Rio de Janeiro and one in São Paulo. However, in order to gain the equipment, Chateaubriand had to wait for the end of the war, as the war had affected the production of television equipment.

Once the war was over, in 1946, Chateaubriand convinced Sarnoff and Zworykin to obtain financial means for the stations, in exchange for extensive advertising contracts, with a varying length between 12 and 18 months. The equipment bought weighed in at US$5 million. Such sponsors had to take part in a portion of the costs of building the station, whereas a long financing with suppliers was up to Diários Associados.

The following year, Chateaubriand returned to the USA to finish the ordering of the equipment he bought.

RCA and Emissoras Associadas signed a contract on May 2, 1949, in São Paulo, however, It took nearly two years to receive the equipment in Brazil.

=== 1948-1950: Obtaining the licenses ===
S/A Rádio Tupi, who had already owned namesake radio stations in São Paulo and Rio de Janeiro, formalized a requirement at the Federal Government on January 7, 1948, soliciting special authorization to operate two television channels. Television still demanded high investments, so the requirement had to be done in the name of another company of the group, with Rádio Difusora São Paulo S/A being selected. In October 1948, the buying of the RCA equipment was made official, which would later be used exclusively for the São Paulo station.

Twenty days after Rádio Tupi's request, on January 27, 1948, Diário da Noite reported about Chateaubriand's plans for the first time: at the top of its front page, the headline announced "Television for Rio and S. Paulo" and at the bottom of the page, a small report: after being in New York, Chateaubriand would travel to London and Paris. It was initially supposed that São Paulo would get television from November 1948 and Rio de Janeiro, from February 1949.

Diário da Noite's reports in 1948 informed that the equipment would arrive to Brazil in June 1949, with the transmitter to be installed at the Banco do Estado de São Paulo building, at the time the tallest in the continent, and with studios in the Sumaré neighborhood, where Diários Associados had built Cidade do Rádio (Radio City) for its radio studio compound in 1942. On May 3, 1949, the day following the signing of the contract and Diário da Noite's revealing reports about the station, other newspapers owned by the group put the then-upcoming TV Tupi, specifically the São Paulo station as "South America's vanguard in the field of television". From then to the end of August that year, phrases regarding the upcoming station were published, one of them being "Aguardem as instalações de televisão dos Associados" (Wait for Associados' television facilities).

On October 29, 1949, the equipment for the Rio station provided by General Electric had finally arrived, whereas for the São Paulo station, from RCA, had arrived in late January 1950. Rádio e Televisão do Brasil, which had vowed for the channel 2 frequency in Rio de Janeiro, revoked its contract with General Electric at a time the proposed station was facing financial uncertainties (the station's preliminary license was revoked by order of Decree nº 30583 on February 22, 1952).

In May 1950, 2,400 television sets were made available in Rio de Janeiro, mainly aimed at stores, some aimed at the company. The initial goal of starting the station in late June failed, numerous delays occurred, and with the first experimental broadcasts (weeks later converted to regular broadcasts) of XHTV in Mexico City, Rio de Janeiro no longer had the "primacy" of housing the first television station in Latin America.

In São Paulo, RCA-Victor engineers arrived in February 1949, with the aim of studying ideal locations for the building of the studios, the transmitter and the antenna. During the building in 1950, these engineers were joined by technicians from RCA and Mario Alderighi, who started supervising the project following the conclusion of Rádio Tupi's new technical park the previous year. The building was authorized on September 18, 1949 - exactly one year ahead of the start of the São Paulo station. The equipment left the USA on January 11, 1950, this time from Philadelphia, arriving in São Paulo from Santos on March 24.

=== Formation ===
The arrival of the equipment to Rio de Janeiro was reported by the American and Argentine press. The initial goal was to have the equipment ready in time for the 1950 FIFA World Cup, held in six Brazilian cities from June 24 to July 16, with the potential televised carriage of eight matches, including the inaugural match and the final, held at the Maracanã Stadium, built for the competition. The equipment came from New York on October 14, 1949, transported by cargo to Rio de Janeiro where it arrived on October 30, 90 days before the Tupi station in São Paulo got its equipment. The expectation for the Tupi station in Rio de Janeiro was to be on air in March or April 1950. Sugarloaf Mountain was selected as the site for the Rio transmitter and antenna. This selection came after a negative result from the Catholic Church to install it in Corcovado, which would have provided the station with better video and audio quality. The technical director of the station in Rio said that the potential location of the transmitter in Corcovado, which was ultimately rejected, gave proof that "science and the church have never maintained good relations". Transporting the equipment to Sugarloaf Mountain was a challenge in itself, and by then, projections for the Rio station's sign-on were aimed at June 1950. The World Cup would have been the first content seen on the station.

Camera tests were conducted in Rio de Janeiro during April 1950.

=== Tests in São Paulo ===
At the end of June 1950, RCA and Emissoras Associadas technicians were finishing the process of installation of the studios at the Sumaré and Banespa buildings. Finishing touches for equipment used for the station were also on the order. According to the Catholic Church's calendar, 1950 was considered to be a "holy year" and numerous activities were being held in that period. Aside from that, Insústrias Alimentícias Carlos de Britto S/A had just turned 50, and to coincide with these two special occasions, Chateaubriand brought Mexican religious singer Friar José Mojica to Brazil, to perform live on Rádio Tupi São Paulo, Rádio Tupi Rio de Janeiro and Rádio Farroupilha (Porto Alegre) - all of which were under Associadas' control. Mojica was subsequently invited to perform in the experimental broadcasts of TV Tupi in São Paulo, whose first test was conducted on July 4, 1950, with equipment brought in from the mobile unit and the Sumaré studio. The test broadcast with Mojica's performance was seen on two monitors totalling around 600 viewers.

Said experiment started at 10pm that evening starting with an RCA test pattern followed by a static ID of a native man, symbol of the station, with the inscription "PRG-3 - Tupi TV" and the start of formalities held by Homero Silva, Yara Lins and Walter Forster, who announced that this was the first broadcast, and the appearance of José Mujica. Television was already starting to become a reality, even though it was still in closed circuit mode. According to actor Lima Duarte, Mojica likely sang the song "Júrame", his greatest hit in his secular phase, however, said song wasn't listed in the repertory. It's unknown if Mojica sang the song live, creating an urban legend. The first test night in the closed-circuit system had great image quality, and had lived up to what Diário de São Paulo called "the greatest happening in bandeirante broadcasting". Mujica did further appearances in further test broadcasts during July.

The first broadcast of the terrestrial station, on channel 3, took place on July 24, 1950 - eight days after XHTV in Mexico City did the same. The first tests used had the RCA Indian-head test pattern, which would end up being used by other stations in Brazil, including those that didn't rely on RCA for its equipment. Said test pattern would be used during the entirety of the run of monochrome television in Brazil. This experiment lasted for 23 days. Another technical challenge was the possibility of having its signal received in Jundiaí and Campinas in inland São Paulo.

Experimental programming over the terrestrial signal started on August 16, 1950, airing from 5pm to 7pm. The line-up consisted of some filmed content produced by Diários Associados, including musical performances, with the length of about three to five minutes, documentaries on general topics, including football, and cartoons without subtitles in Portuguese.

=== 1950s ===
On August 5, 1950, it was determined that the São Paulo station (PRF-3) would operate on VHF channel 3 under the revised callsign PRF3-TV. The number 3 had no relation to the channel's frequency and was already existent in the radio station's callsign by default. Regarding the name of the station, the name "Tupi" was secondary, as the preferred name was PRF-3 and sometimes TV-3. At a later stage the channel was also known as TV Tupi-Difusora, referring to the group's two radio stations. The name "Tupi" came from a desire Assis Cheateaubriand had for years, using native Brazilian names to represent the roots of Brazilian culture.

The station was originally set to be launched on September 5, but was later delayed to September 7 (Brazil's Independence Day), and subsequently the second half of September (starting from September 16). The official launch date was announced on September 13: September 18, 1950.

That day, the station went on the air at 5pm with solemn formalities. At 6pm, a private cocktail for invitees was held, without being broadcast. At 9pm, broadcasts resumed with the launch show TV na Taba, featuring a variety of talents that already worked for the group's radio stations, running for two hours. All the events were held at the studios in Sumaré, which had become the "cradle" of television.

The test pattern was switched on at 4pm. During the solemn ceremony, Assis Chateaubriand was in the studio alongside Catholic figure Paulo Rolim Loureiro; poet Rosalina Coelho Lisboa Larragoiti, chosen as the "godmother" of PRF3-TV; young actress Sônia Maria Dorce; presenter Homero Silva; and actresses Yara Lins and Lia de Aguiar. Numerous civil, military and religious figures also attended the event. Said event started thirty minutes later than planned (at 5:30pm) when the test pattern gave way to Sônia Maria Dorce, who became the first face seen on the regular service, saying "Boa tarde! Está no ar a televisão do Brasil!", dressed up in a Tupiniquim outfit, alluding to the channel's name. Yara Lins followed, mentioning the names and callsigns of all of the Associadas radio stations, more than twenty, and introduced "the first television program in Latin America". The first commercials were read out by Homero Silva and Lia Borges de Aguiar, with congratulatory messages from four brands that invested in its building: Guaraná Antarctica, Lãs Sams, Sul América and Prata Wolff.

The succession of speeches ended at 6pm, during which the station, covering the hours of the private cocktail, would put the test pattern back on the air, and would also promote the 9pm show. Over time, some of the visitors who attended the ceremony entered the sectors of the station to view its facilities.

TV na Taba was scheduled to at 9pm. Produced by Cassiano Gabus Mendes and Luiz Gallon, it was presented by Homero Silva, who did the same in the earlier formalities. Stars from the radio stations owned by Associadas were invited and presented in small sketches, but since they had no experience in television, they thought that the show wouldn't go as planned.

The first night had a stressful situation, of which several versions exist. Ahead of the start of TV na Taba, the RCA TK-30 camera at studio B wasn't working. The version that is most circulated was that Chateaubriand broke the camera with a champagne bottle. Contrary to popular belief, the camera was damaged after the priest who attended the blessing ceremony threw holy water to it. Due to the issue that damaged one of the three cameras, TV na Taba started 40 minutes later than scheduled. A two-minute film showing footage of São Paulo, troops (recorded on Independence Day less than two weeks earlier), the presses of the Associados' newspapers and people listening to radio, followed an initial slide. Homero Silva introduced the station as "something so exceptional, so revolutionary". As the camera aimed at one of the women in the studio asking about what would the station offer, Homero Silva said that music was one of the key elements of the new station, before starting a succession of performances. Near the end of the program, at 11:30pm, Lolita Rodrigues sang "Canção da TV", especially composed for the station, after Hebe Camargo declined. The show lasted until 12:20am. At closing time, during the performance of Dorval Caymmi's song "Acalanto", Homero Silva gave one last message:

"A televisão é tudo isso, em espetáculos diários que irão ter no recesso do lar de um imenso público. A televisão é alegria, é cultura, é divertimento!"

In subsequent days, the station faced another problem: obtaining content to fill the schedule. Such need arose in the hours following the inaugural broadcast. From September 19, the schedule would be filled by educational films and documentaries, as well as cartoons without translation, and content prepared for the experimental phase. Cassiano Gabus Mendes invented the catchphrase "de noite tem" (there is [content] at night), representing that the content would be shown in the evening hours. Only from September 27 would Diário da Noite publish the schedules. From then on, programming produced by TV Tupi would gradually appear. Only the first program of the day had a fixed starting time (8pm). The remaining programs still had uncertain starting times, meaning that in such situations, either the test pattern or the filler films would take its place.

The first televised news program, Imagens do Dia, in newsreel format, aired on September 28, 1950. Early editions paid attention to the then-upcoming 1950 Brazilian presidential election, which were ultimately won by Getúlio Vargas, who returned to the presidency. Often, after the news, they aired cartoons: Woody Woodpecker and Andy Panda, both creations by Walter Lantz. The first feature film broadcast by Tupi was the 1947 Italian production Tragic Hunt on September 24 - Sundays were dedicated to feature-length films and Mondays were rest days. Movies were either in their original language, yet few of them had subtitles. In rare cases, dubs coming from Portugal were ordered.

The first football match was televised on October 15, 1950 at 3:30pm. The match was for São Paulo's state championship in which Palmeiras defeated São Paulo 2-0 at the Pacaembu Stadium. Diário de São Paulo reported the good quality of the match and soon would also air horse racing from the São Paulo Jockey Club. A competing newspaper, however, noted that such broadcast had technical issues.

On November 29, the first televised stage play aired: A Vida por um Fio, adapted from the American movie Sorry, Wrong Number. The station managed to gain advertising revenue, although of an irregular nature, in 1950, in December that year, a regular advertising contract was signed for the first time, and regular television advertising started on January 1, 1951. Companies would also line up to sponsor entire shows. Initially commercials were read live from art cards in a wall of the studio, before changing to slides or live advertising.

The station awarded its definitive license on March 7, 1951.

The Rio station started its experimental broadcasts on October 5, 1950, callsign PRG-3. The station signed on for the first time on January 20, 1951, seven days before awarding its license.

Over time, outside broadcasts in the São Paulo station started to become more frequent, with football matches, Sunday services and turf, the latter of which had its first telecast on November 10, 1951 from the Cidade Jardim hippodrome. Out of all these broadcasts, football matches were the main source of attraction.

TV Tupi Rio de Janeiro broadcast the first televised kiss on Brazilian television in its first telenovela, Sua Vida Me Pertence (Your Life Belongs to Me), on February 8, 1952.

Facing competition not only in the city alone but also in the technological field, TV Tupi reacted to TV Record and, with its updated equipment, would carry a test from São Caetano do Sul, which consisted of a friendly match between São Bento and Palmeiras. The first experiment was satisfactory, mostly due to the proximity of the two municipalities, as well as the possibility of sending the signal direct to the São Paulo studios. A similar experiment was conducted in Santos for a live telecast of a match between Santos FC and Palmeiras on December 18, that same year. In July 1956, a relay station opened in Santos. From then on, TV Tupi started broadcasting live football matches from Santos in addition to those already played in São Paulo.

When TV Record linked up its stations between Rio de Janeiro and São Paulo in 1956, Tupi again lagged behind. The two Tupi stations decided to form a bespoke network in the same year, by means of a provisional (but fixed) network of 500 km worth of microwave lines. The network would later extend to TV Itacolomi, in Belo Horizonte, founded in November 1955. With that, the two stations started interchanging programs. With the combined efforts of the two teams, the first experimental broadcast between Rio and São Paulo took place at 5pm on July 7, 1956, when Guilherme Figueiredo, artistic director of the Rio station, introduced viewers in São Paulo. On July 9, a live broadcast from the Senate of Brazil was held.

=== 1960s ===
Between April 20 and 23, 1960, 12 million viewers saw live broadcasts of Juscelino Kubitschek's historic trip to Brasília in alignment with its founding and that of TV Brasília, by means of an improvised microwave link to the southeastern stations. The station celebrated its tenth anniversary on September 10, 1960 with a special program from Ilha Porchat in Santos, with the participation of American actress Julie London. By 1962, Rede Brasileira de Televisão Associada, the bespoke network created by Diários Associados, had thirteen television stations. In July 1963, the São Paulo station started a relay in São José do Rio Preto. Videotape experiments were conducted by TV Tupi São Paulo on May 1, 1960, with the recording of TV de Vanguarda, with the play Esta Noite é Nossa. The system was officially inaugurated on September 26 with Grande Teatro Tupi and its special performance of Hamlet.

The arrival and massification of videotapes have led to the increase in the quality of its telenovelas. In 1963, TV Excelsior produced its first daily novela, 2-5499 Ocupado. Facing the competition, in early 1964, Tupi received a proposal from Palmolive to create daily telenovelas in the 8pm slot, with a length of 40 minutes per episode. Festival de Novelas Palmolive started with Alma Cigana, broadcast between March 2 and May 8 that year. Later, O Direito de Nascer became its first hit in the genre, which was also seen as an affront to Excelsior's competing A Moça que Veio de Longe, which didn't attract enough ratings.

Tupi had its own mark in news: Rede Tupi de Noticias (Tupi News Network) became one of its successful programmes. The newscast was unique because it was broadcast three times each night. Ana Maria Braga was the main presenter. It had three sections: sports, local news and national/world news.

In 1963, it became Brazil's second television network to experiment with television programmes broadcasting in color following Rede Excelsior in 1962. To this end, the São Paulo station promoted "The Biggest Night of the Year" on May 1, 1963. The first experiment consisted of the broadcast of the documentary Venceu o Brasil in NTSC format. Days later on May 9, these experiments became official. Preceding this experiment was a series of paintings by Scottish artist Norman McLaren, followed by Tupi's experimental color programs. The station started testing color broadcasts with a color test pattern between 11am and 12pm on May 13, followed by color programming for approximately one hour from 5pm, with Walter Lantz cartoons. After its founder's death in 1968, the network, due to a crisis with its owners, transitioned itself becoming the first national television network in 1970, composed of its two main stations, Channels 4 and 6, its 7 other stations and 17 affiliate stations nationwide.

=== 1970s ===
In 1972, Tupi joined other Brazilian stations in the move to full color TV broadcasts. On March 31, that very year Tupi's special program, Mais Cor em Sua Vida (More Color in Your Life) officially kicked off its color transmissions, and debuted a new logo in celebration, replacing the old number 6 logo used in Rio during its monochrome days.

The network started to experience difficulties during the 1970s, including a huge debt, which resulted in a strike by the actors of their telenovelas. Things went from bad to worse after a fire broke out in 1978.

=== Closure ===
Rede Tupi was ordered by the federal government of Brazil (military dictatorship at the time) to cease its operations. This happened from the 16th to the 18th, in July 1980, when its two stations in São Paulo (Tupi Channel 4) and Rio de Janeiro (Tupi Channel 6) shut down, together with its 7 other stations nationwide. The Department of National Telecommunications did not approve the planned extension of Rede Tupi's television licenses. Following the closure of Rede Tupi's seven stations the previous day, the Rio station signed off for the last time on midday of the 18th. The final days of broadcasts at the network's Rio de Janeiro studios are the 18-hour long vigil. The network rebroadcast the mass attended by Pope John Paul II (during his visit to Brazil) at Rio de Janeiro. Its sounds was replaced by a voiceover appealing to president João Figueiredo, accompanied by emotional background music. Then, it switched to the staff of the station who they turned emotional. "Até breve, telespectadores amigos" (See you soon, friendly viewers) and its network's name under the words, was appeared on the screen in capital letters with the theme song of the 1976 American horror film Carrie composed by Pino Donaggio playing in the background. This was switched to its logo in a black background, with the theme song of American documentary series Victory at Sea, composed by Richard Rodgers, as its background music, then to static. Various networks in Brazil covered the closure of the station, including Rede Bandeirantes.

Tupi's São Paulo, Porto Alegre and Belém channels became the nuclei of SBT (Brazilian Television System, then TVS, TV Studios Channel 4) of the Grupo Silvio Santos (Silvio Santos Group) of Silvio Santos later in August 1981. Its Rio, Belo Horizonte, Recife and Fortaleza outlets became the nucleus of Rede Manchete (Manchete Network Channel 9), of the Bloch Editores (Bloch Editors) publishing group of Adolpho Bloch, in June 1983.

=== Aftermath ===
After the closure of Rede Tupi, the federal government passed the station's assets to businessmen. Bidding was opened on July 23, 1980 and the Grupo Abril (which would later operate MTV Brasil), the Silvio Santos Group (SBT), the Bloch (Rede Manchete), and other smaller companies entered the race. As at the time, Veja Magazine was bothering the government with criticism, they decided to pass on April 23, 1981, a new license of channel 4 in São Paulo to the Silvio Santos, channel 6 in RJ to the Bloch Group and from 1985, the other assets of the station (building, equipment and another unused channel) to the Silvio Santos Group and Abril.

The station's building served as the headquarters of Abril, which for 23 years, generated the MTV Brasil channel, currently on pay television directly by Viacom (now Paramount Global), under the name MTV. Despite not being able to obtain the VHF channel 4 license, necessary to carry out the project to create its television network, in January 1987, the Grupo Abril obtained its UHF channel. After getting its own channel, and with the maturity of MTV Brasil in the market, Abril Radiodifusão applied in 2003 for several TV retransmission licenses in various locations in the country. After a rapid crisis in the group and the huge drop in ratings, not only for direct competitors, but also for the internet, MTV Brasil closed on September 30, 2013, giving way to Ideal TV, which was previously a subscription channel, now as a provisional broadcaster, since Abril did not express interest in maintaining the channel. On December 18, 2013, Grupo Abril announced the sale of Abril Radiodiffusion, which broadcasts Ideal TV, to Grupo Spring, which publishes the Brazilian edition of Rolling Stone magazine. The values of the transaction were not disclosed, but according to sources heard by the newspaper Folha de S. Paulo, the sale was closed at around R$350 million and was carried out by the USA bank JP Morgan. The sale was approved by the Ministry of Communications and the Administrative Council for Economic Defense (CADE).

Spring Comunicação even founded Loading in 2020, however the license sale was annulled in 2020. The fourth panel of the Federal Regional Court of the 3rd region would have annulled in November 2020, exactly one month before the debut of Loading, the transfer of the concessions of the television channels belonging to Abril to Spring Comunicação. In addition, the Union must make a new offer for the concessions of the extinct MTV Brasil, just as the decree of then-President Michel Temer, signed in October 2016, would have lost its validity. The station was only able to remain on the air thanks to an injunction requesting a review of the conviction requested by the MPF, granted by the court. A new trial by the TRF-3 was scheduled for July 22., the trial was postponed to August 19, where it defined the station's dismissal immediately, with no way to reverse it.

In 1998, DA won a lawsuit for damages against the Federal Government, and will have to be compensated for the intervention that resulted in the loss of 5 of the 7 channels of the Associated Broadcasters, which did not face financial difficulties at the time. Only TV Tupi in São Paulo and TV Tupi in Rio were in arrears. In the case of channel 6 in Rio de Janeiro, a good part of its bills were paid by Super Radio Tupi in Rio, since the radio and TV were part of the same corporate name (S/A Rádio Tupi). At the time, the law provided that the federal government would have to appoint an intervenor to take over the management of companies in difficulty, thus removing their controllers, who led to the crisis they were facing, and only in the event of bankruptcy, which did not happen, would the decision that was made be made, which was not the case of TV Tupi in São Paulo, and neither of TV Tupi in Rio, since its assets, real estate, equipment, facilities, etc., covered the existing debts. After winning the compensation, Diários Associados obtained the concession of channel 9 in Recife and had negotiations for the purchase of Rede Manchete.

In September 2024, a group of businessmen revealed the process to relaunch TV Tupi, with its launch set for March 2025. Its content will initially be livestreamed on YouTube, targeting audiences over the age of 50, to attract by their affective memory of the name. A studio in São Paulo was contacted for production, and variety shows will be broadcast live from a theatre room. Negotiations involve independent relay stations and the rights of the name TV Tupi. The channel will target a niche over-50 audience not covered by the larger networks. It is unknown what happened to the planned relaunch.

On May 13, 2026, the São Paulo Radio Workers' Union distributed a total of R$2 million to around 50 staff of the former network flagship, corresponding to delayed wages; a decision was pending to some 150 extra staff.

== Visual identity ==
=== Logos ===
Initially the logo was an illustrated drawing of a Tupiniquim man with the callsign of the station (PRG-3) below. Since the station had excessive program breaks at the beginning, the station had to rely on a modified RCA monoscope and two intermission slides. The test pattern had, clockwise, the drawing of the Indian, the channel frequency (channel 3), the RCA logo and the callsign (PRF-3 TV). These slides and the test pattern led to the creation of the iconic phrase "mais chato que o índio da TV" (more boring than the TV indian, sometimes "mais chato que o índio da Tupi"). Technicians working for the radio stations complained over the constant technical difficulties, as they were used to radio's punctuality. An RCA Gray-Telop machine was installed in March 1951, six months after the São Paulo station was founded.

Mario Fanucchi arrived at Tupi in December 1950, replacing other artists who made such slides. He then designed the iconic mascot, a child version of the extant logo, of which the head was used as a branding device on several of its stations starting in 1951, sparking interest not only in children but also among viewers who weren't comfortable with the long program breaks. Airton Rodrigues gave him the name Tupiniquim, which was approved by Cassiano Gabus Mendes. In Rio de Janeiro a different figure was used, a female character, inside a 6. Other secondary logos were used mainly in print ads in newspapers in the latter years of its monochrome operation.

With the start of color TV in Brazil, Fanucchi's logo was replaced by a new logo, which was the result of a competition. Said competition was announced in the group's newspapers and magazines and would spark the interest of college students in graphic and industrial design. The new logo had elements related to television transmission, two intermingling oscilloscope lines with three circles - each in red, green and blue. The winner went to Paris under a trip paid by Air France to visit one of the main industrial design schools of France. Not much information is known about the winner.

Briefly in 1976-1977, a six-pronged windmill was used in the São Paulo station, showing its integration to the network. The logo was massively rejected and the previous logo was resumed, with slight modifications.

The last logo of the network was introduced in 1979, and was designed by Cyro del Nero. It consisted of a T divided in three pieces, each of them with a curved edge, consisting of a small blue piece and two equal larger pieces, a horizontal one in red and a vertical one in green. Jokes had emerged within the network that, despite giving a sense of modernity, it was pejoratively nicknamed "tesão", referring to a possible double entendre in the design. For the thirtieth anniversary, which was aborted due to the shutdown of the network, del Nero made a second version with the logo inside a television screen.

==== Logo history ====
1972-1978

1978-1980

=== Slogan history ===
- 1950—1952: A Primeira TV do Brasil, A Primeira da América Latina (The First TV Station of Brazil, the First of Latin America)
- 1956-1963: Seus 500, Mais 500 (Your 500, More 500)
- 1963-1972: Pioneira em Imagem-Som, Alcance e Cor (Pioneer in Picture-Sound, Reach and Color)
- 1972: Sistema Tupicolor, vamos por mais cor na sua vida (The Tupicolor system, Let's Put More Color in Your Life)
- 1973—1975: Tupi, uma estação de emoções (Tupi, An Emotional Station)
- 1974—1979: Do tamanho do Brasil (As Big as Brazil)
- 1974—1975: 22 emissoras cobrindo o céu do Brasil (22 stations covering the Brazilian sky)
- 1975: A Primeira Imagem da TV (TV's First Picture)
- 1976: A informação, a emoção, a diversão (Information, emotion, fun)
- 1977—1978: Tupi, mais calor humano (Tupi, more human warmth)
- 1978-1980: Sempre o bom programa (Always a great program)
- 1979-1980: Esporte e aqui, na Rede Tupi (Sports are now on Rede Tupi)

=== Idents ===
Year	Ident
1950	
1972	
1974	
1978	
1980	

== Regional stations ==
Rede Tupi had a total of fifteen owned-and-operated stations during its 30 years of existence, and sold TV Coroados in 1973 and TV Paraná in 1974 to other owners, leaving it with thirteen stations. On July 16, 1980, the Federal Government revoked seven of these concessions and the following year, through public competition, transferred three of them to the Silvio Santos Group (which created SBT) and four to the Bloch Group (which created Rede Manchete, succeeded by the current RedeTV!). The other stations that were saved from revocation joined independent programming until the emergence of new networks or migrated to other existing networks.

=== Flagship stations ===
Station	Channel	Frequency	City, State	Years of affiliation	Current situation
TV Tupi	3 (1950–60), 4 (1960–80)	VHF	São Paulo, São Paulo	1950–80	Signed off July 14, 1980 following a decision by the board (frequency occupied by SBT São Paulo from 1981 to 2017)
TV Tupi	6	VHF	Rio de Janeiro, Rio de Janeiro	1951–80	Signed off July 18, 1980 (frequency occupied by TV Manchete Rio de Janeiro from 1983 to 1999 and RedeTV! Rio de Janeiro from 1999 to 2017)
TV Tupi	3	VHF	Ribeirão Preto, São Paulo	1959–63	Signed off 1963 due to a storm that damaged its transmitter, subsequent attempts at restarting in the mid-1960s were proven fruitless.

=== O&Os ===
Station	Channel	Frequency	City, State	Years of affiliation	Current situation
TV Itacolomi	4	VHF	Belo Horizonte, Minas Gerais	1955–80	Signed off July 18, 1980 (frequency occupied by TV Manchete Belo Horizonte from 1983 to 1999 and RedeTV! Belo Horizonte from 1999 to 2017)
TV Piratini	5	VHF	Porto Alegre, Rio Grande do Sul	1959–80	Signed off July 18, 1980 (frequency occupied by SBT RS from 1981 to 2018)
TV Brasília	5 (1960), 6 (1960-)	VHF	Brasília, Federal District	1960–80	Affiliated to RedeTV!; belongs to Diários Associados and Organizações Paulo Octávio, signed off in 2017
TV Rádio Clube	6	VHF	Recife, Pernambuco	1960–80	Signed off July 18, 1980 (frequency occupied by TV Manchete Recife from 1984 to 1999 and RedeTV! Recife from 1999 to 2017)
TV Ceará	2	VHF	Fortaleza, Ceará	1960–80	Signed off July 18, 1980 (frequency occupied by TV Manchete Fortaleza from 1984 to 1999 and RedeTV! Fortaleza from 1999 to 2017)
TV Paraná	6	VHF	Curitiba, Paraná	1960–78	Currently CNT Curitiba, affiliated to CNT; belongs to Organizações Martinez, signed off in 2017
TV Goyá	4	VHF	Goiânia, Goiás	1961–80	Currently Record Goiás, affiliated to Record; belongs to Grupo Record, signed off in 2017
TV Vitória	6	VHF	Vitória, Espírito Santo	1961–80	Affiliated to Record; belongs to Grupo Buaiz, signed off in 2017
TV Marajoara	2	VHF	Belém, Pará	1961–80	Signed off July 18, 1980 (frequency occupied by SBT Pará from 1981 to 2018)
TV Coroados	3	VHF	Londrina, Paraná	1963–73	Currently RPC Londrina, affiliated to TV Globo; belongs to GRPCOM, signed off in 2017
TV Borborema	9	VHF	Campina Grande, Paraíba	1966–80	Affiliated to SBT; belongs to Sistema Opinião de Comunicação, signed off in 2017
TV Baré	4	VHF	Manaus, Amazonas	1972–80	Currently TV A Crítica, independent; belongs to Rede Calderaro de Comunicação, signed off in 2017
TV Itapoan	5	VHF	Salvador, Bahia	1960–80	Currently Record Bahia, affiliated to Record; belongs to Grupo Record, signed off in 2017

=== Affiliates ===
- TV Sentinela (Óbidos, PA) — Channel 7 VHF (now a Rede Bandeirantes affiliate)
- TV Iguaçu (Curitiba, PR) — Channel 4 VHF (1978—1980) (now a SBT affiliate)
- TV Cultura (Florianópolis, SC) — Canal 6 VHF (now Record News Santa Catarina)
- TV Uberaba (Uberaba, MG) — Channel 7 VHF (now TV Bandeirantes Triângulo)
- TV Tibagi (Apucarana, PR) — Channel 11 VHF (now a part of Rede Massa (SBT))
- TV Coroados (Londrina, PR) — Channel 3 VHF (now a part of RPC (TV Globo)
- TV Rio Preto (São José do Rio Preto, SP) — Channel 8 VHF (Now Record Rio Preto)
- TV Esplanada (Ponta Grossa, PR) — Channel 7 VHF (now a part of RPC (TV Globo))
- TV Coligadas (Blumenau, SC) — Channel 3 VHF (now a part of NSC TV (TV Globo))
- TV Altamira (Altamira, PA) — Channel 6 VHF (now a Rede Brasil affiliate)
- TV Sergipe (Aracaju, SE) (1971—1975) — Channel 4 VHF (now a TV Globo affiliate)
- TV Atalaia (Aracaju, SE) (1975—1980) — Channel 8 VHF (now a Record affiliate)
- TV Brasil Oeste (Cuiabá, MT) (1978—1980) — Channel 8 VHF (now a Rede Brasil affiliate)

== Soap operas ==
- Sua Vida Me Pertence (1951 - 1952)
- Direito ao Coração (1952)
- Meu Trágico Destino (1952)
- Noivado nas Trevas (1952)
- Rosas para o Meu Amor (1952)
- Um Beijo na Sombra (1952)
- Uma Semana de Vida (1952 - 1953)
- A Viúva (1953)
- Abismo (1953)
- Aladim e a Lâmpada Maravilhosa (1953)
- Ímpeto (1953)
- Minha Boneca (1953)
- Na Solidão da Noite (1953)
- O Último Inverno (1953)
- Os Humildes (1953)
- Segundos Fatais (1953 - 1954)
- Aventuras de Dr Quixote (1954)
- Labakam, o Alfaiate (1954)
- O Grande Sonho (1954)
- O Homem Sem Passado (1954)
- Pinocchio (1954)
- Sangue na Terra (1954 - 1955)
- Ciúme (1955)
- As Professoras (1955)
- Bocage (1955)
- Ambição (1955)
- Jane Eyre (1955)
- Kim (1955)
- Miguel Strogof (1955)
- Os Dez Mandamentos (1955)
- Os Irmãos Corsos (1955)
- Oliver Twist (1955)
- Peter Pan (1955)
- Suspeita (1955)
- A Família Boaventura (1956)
- Bidu e Bimbim (1956)
- César e Cleópatra (1956)
- Conde de Monte Cristo (1956)
- Heidi (1956)
- O Palhaço (1956)
- O Volante Fantasma (1956)
- Robin Hood (1956)
- Scaramouche (1956)
- Pollyana (1956 -1957)
- A Canção de Bernadete (1957)
- As Solteironas (1957)
- Caminhos Incertos (1957)
- Arsène Lupin (1957)
- Coração Inquieto (1957)
- Cristóvão Colombo (1957)
- Lever no Espaço (1957)
- O Corcunda de Notre Dame (1957)

== See also ==
- Tongyang Broadcasting Company - A South Korean broadcasting company that was also forcefully closed down by the military dictatorship at the same year.
- RCTV (not RCTI) - A Venezuelan broadcasting company that was forcefully closed down by the government.
- ABS-CBN - A Philippine media company that their terrestrial network was shut down by the government after the franchise was expired.
- Thames Television - A London ITV franchise holder that lost its ITV franchise due to an alleged political motivations against airing of a documentary about Operation Flavius titled "Death on the Rock".
- MTV Brasil
- Ideal TV
- SBT
- Rede Manchete
- Rede TV!
