= TV Tupi São Paulo =

TV Tupi São Paulo (ZYB 855)
- São Paulo; Brazil
- Channels: Analog: 4 (VHF)

Programming
- Affiliations: Rede Tupi

Ownership
- Owner: Diários Associados

History
- First air date: September 18, 1950
- Last air date: July 18, 1980
- Former call signs: PRF-3 TV (1950-1970); ZYE 439 (1970-1977)
- Former channel number: 3 (1950-1960)

Technical information
- Licensing authority: DENTEL

TV Tupi São Paulo
- Replaced: TV Tupi Ribeirão Preto, Ribeirão Preto station only

TV Tupi São Paulo was a Brazilian television station located in the city of São Paulo, capital of the state of the same name. Opened by journalist and businessman Assis Chateaubriand on September 18, 1950, it was the first television station in the country and in South America, the second in Latin America and the sixth in the world. It was owned by Diários Associados, one of the most important media conglomerates of the time, which included several newspapers, magazines and radio stations. For most of its existence, it operated network programming alongside TV Tupi Rio de Janeiro. Due to its history of administrative and financial problems, in addition to delays in payments and strikes by its employees, its concession was revoked, along with six other stations, in July 1980.

== History ==
=== Build-up and experimental broadcasts ===
Assis Chateaubriand received licenses for television stations in São Paulo and Rio de Janeiro in 1948.

On January 27, 1948, Diário da Noite reported the arrival of television to both Rio and São Paulo.

At the end of June 1950, RCA and Emissoras Associadas technicians were finishing the process of installation of the studios at the Sumaré and Banespa buildings. Finishing touches for equipment used for the station were also on the order. According to the Catholic Church's calendar, 1950 was considered to be a "holy year" and numerous activities were being held in that period. Aside from that, Insústrias Alimentícias Carlos de Britto S/A had just turned 50, and to coincide with these two special occasions, Chateaubriand brought Mexican religious singer Friar José Mojica to Brazil, to perform live on Rádio Tupi São Paulo, Rádio Tupi Rio de Janeiro and Rádio Farroupilha (Porto Alegre) - all of which were under Associadas' control. Mojica was subsequently invited to perform in the experimental broadcasts of TV Tupi in São Paulo, whose first test was conducted on July 4, 1950, with equipment brought in from the mobile unit and the Sumaré studio. The test broadcast with Mojica's performance was seen on two monitors totalling around 600 viewers.

Said experiment started at 10pm that evening starting with an RCA test pattern followed by a static ID of a native man, symbol of the station, with the inscription "PRF-3 - Tupi TV" and the start of formalities held by Homero Silva, Yara Lins and Walter Forster, who announced that this was the first broadcast, and the appearance of José Mujica. Television was already starting to become a reality, even though it was still in closed circuit mode. According to actor Lima Duarte, Mojica likely sang the song "Júrame", his greatest hit in his secular phase, however, said song wasn't listed in the repertory. It's unknown if Mojica sang the song live, creating an urban legend. The first test night in the closed-circuit system had great image quality, and had lived up to what Diário de São Paulo called "the greatest happening in bandeirante broadcasting". Mujica did further appearances in further test broadcasts during July.

The first broadcast of the terrestrial station, on channel 3, took place on July 24, 1950 - eight days after XHTV in Mexico City did the same. The first tests used had the RCA Indian-head test pattern, which would end up being used by other stations in Brazil, including those that didn't rely on RCA for its equipment. Said test pattern would be used during the entirety of the run of monochrome television in Brazil. This experiment lasted for 23 days. Another technical challenge was the possibility of having its signal received in Jundiaí and Campinas in inland São Paulo.

Experimental programming over the terrestrial signal started on August 16, 1950, airing from 5pm to 7pm. The line-up consisted of some filmed content produced by Diários Associados, including musical performances, with the length of about three to five minutes, documentaries on general topics, including football, and cartoons without subtitles in Portuguese.

On August 5, 1950, it was determined that the São Paulo station (PRF-3) would operate on VHF channel 3 under the revised callsign PRF3-TV. The number 3 had no relation to the channel's frequency and was already existent in the radio station's callsign by default. Regarding the name of the station, the name "Tupi" was secondary, as the preferred name was PRF-3 and sometimes TV-3. At a later stage the channel was also known as TV Tupi-Difusora, referring to the group's two radio stations. The name "Tupi" came from a desire Assis Cheateaubriand had for years, using native Brazilian names to represent the roots of Brazilian culture.

=== Launch, start of regular broadcasts ===
The station was set to be launched on September 5, but was later delayed to September 7 (Brazil's Independence Day), and subsequently the second half of September (starting from September 16). The official launch date was announced on September 13: September 18, 1950.

That day, the station went on the air at 5pm with solemn formalities. At 6pm, a private cocktail for invitees was held, without being broadcast. At 9pm, broadcasts resumed with the launch show TV na Taba, featuring a variety of talents that already worked for the group's radio stations, running for two hours. All the events were held at the studios in Sumaré, which had become the "cradle" of television.

The test pattern was switched on at 4pm. During the solemn ceremony, Assis Chateaubriand was in the studio alongside Catholic figure Paulo Rolim Loureiro; poet Rosalina Coelho Lisboa Larragoiti, chosen as the "godmother" of PRF3-TV; young actress Sônia Maria Dorce; presenter Homero Silva; and actresses Yara Lins and Lia de Aguiar. Numerous civil, military and religious figures also attended the event. Said event started thirty minutes later than planned (at 5:30pm) when the test pattern gave way to Sônia Maria Dorce, who became the first face seen on the regular service, saying "Boa tarde! Está no ar a televisão do Brasil!", dressed up in a Tupiniquim outfit, alluding to the channel's name. Yara Lins followed, mentioning the names and callsigns of all of the Associadas radio stations, more than twenty, and introduced "the first television program in Latin America". The first commercials were read out by Homero Silva and Lia Borges de Aguiar, with congratulatory messages from four brands that invested in its building: Guaraná Antarctica, Lãs Sams, Sul América and Prata Wolff.

The succession of speeches ended at 6pm, during which the station, covering the hours of the private cocktail, would put the test pattern back on the air, and would also promote the 9pm show. Over time, some of the visitors who attended the ceremony entered the sectors of the station to view its facilities.

TV na Taba was scheduled to at 9pm. Produced by Cassiano Gabus Mendes and Luiz Gallon, it was presented by Homero Silva, who did the same in the earlier formalities. Stars from the radio stations owned by Associadas were invited and presented in small sketches, but since they had no experience in television, they thought that the show wouldn't go as planned.

The first night had a stressful situation, of which several versions exist. Ahead of the start of TV na Taba, the RCA TK-30 camera at studio B wasn't working. The version that is most circulated was that Chateaubriand broke the camera with a champagne bottle. Contrary to popular belief, the camera was damaged after the priest who attended the blessing ceremony threw holy water to it. Due to the issue that damaged one of the three cameras, TV na Taba started 40 minutes later than scheduled. A two-minute film showing footage of São Paulo, troops (recorded on Independence Day less than two weeks earlier), the presses of the Associados' newspapers and people listening to radio, followed an initial slide. Homero Silva introduced the station as "something so exceptional, so revolutionary". As the camera aimed at one of the women in the studio asking about what would the station offer, Homero Silva said that music was one of the key elements of the new station, before starting a succession of performances. Near the end of the program, at 11:30pm, Lolita Rodrigues sang "Canção da TV", especially composed for the station, after Hebe Camargo declined. The show lasted until 12:20am. At closing time, during the performance of Dorval Caymmi's song Acalanto, Homero Silva gave one last message:

"A televisão é tudo isso, em espetáculos diários que irão ter no recesso do lar de um imenso público. A televisão é alegria, é cultura, é divertimento!"

In subsequent days, the station faced another problem: obtaining content to fill the schedule. Such need arose in the hours following the inaugural broadcast. From September 19, the schedule would be filled by educational films and documentaries, as well as cartoons without translation, and content prepared for the experimental phase. Cassiano Gabus Mendes invented the catchphrase "de noite tem" (there is [content] at night), representing that the content would be shown in the evening hours. Only from September 27 would Diário da Noite publish the schedules. From then on, programming produced by TV Tupi would gradually appear. Only the first program of the day had a fixed starting time (8pm). The remaining programs still had uncertain starting times, meaning that in such situations, either the test pattern or the filler films would take its place.

The first televised news program, Imagens do Dia, in newsreel format, aired on September 28, 1950. Early editions paid attention to the then-upcoming presidential elections, which were ultimately won by Getúlio Vargas, who returned to presidency. Often, after the news, they aired cartoons: Woody Woodpecker and Andy Panda, both creations by Walter Lantz. The first feature film broadcast by Tupi was the 1947 Italian production Tragic Hunt on September 24 - Sundays were dedicated to feature-length films and Mondays were rest days. Movies were either in their original language, yet few of them had subtitles. In rare cases, dubs coming from Portugal were ordered.

The first football match was televised on October 15, 1950, at 3:30pm. The match was for São Paulo's state championship in which Palmeiras defeated São Paulo 2–0 at the Pacaembu Stadium. Diário de São Paulo reported the good quality of the match and soon would also air horse racing from the São Paulo Jockey Club. A competing newspaper, however, noted that such broadcast had technical issues.

On November 29, the first televised stage play aired: A Vida por um Fio, adapted from the American movie Sorry, Wrong Number. The station managed to gain advertising revenue, although of an irregular nature, in 1950, in December that year, a regular advertising contract was signed for the first time, and regular television advertising started on January 1, 1951. Companies would also line up to sponsor entire shows. Initially commercials were read live from art cards in a wall of the studio, before changing to slides or live advertising.

The station awarded its definitive license on March 7, 1951.

=== 1950s ===
In early 1952, there were already three licenses television stations in São Paulo. At the time, TV Tupi was the only station in operation. TV Record was already in the building phase and TV Excelsior was still a project. A new frequency plan was suggested, where São Paulo, instead of having six television stations (3, 5, 7, 9, 11 and 13) would have seven (2, 4, 5, 7, 9, 11 and 13), displacing channel 3 due to co-channel interference. Equipment had to be bought in order to grant the frequency allocation given to TV Gazeta, which initially was set to broadcast on channel 2. However, delays and burocratic issues delayed the launch further (ultimately the station launched on channel 11 in 1970). Consequently, channel 2 was given to TV Cultura, which was owned by Diários Associados at the time.

In 1959, TV Tupi's São Paulo signal was received as far as the Paraíba Valley and Pindamonhangaba in the far eastern end of the state. Occasionally, the signal was received in other states and in Buenos Aires due to tropospheric propagation. In the middle of the year, the station bought videotape equipment - following TV Continental's historic feat in signing on with such technology - by buying an RCA-Victor TRT-1B machine, installed on April 19, 1960. The first videotape test was held on May 1, 1960. In it, its iconic TV de Vanguarda program presented the play "Esta Noite é Nossa". The arrival of the new technology was seen with much optimism and some pessimism. In the second experiment, held in the following week's TV de Vanguarda play "O Duelo" on May 8, there were problems: the videotape machine was unable to do cuts and there was only one quadruplex tape lasting 60 minutes. The play had to be adapted to match the length of the tape, but ultimately, the last minutes were presented live.

=== 1960s, move to channel 4 ===
Work on the new Sumaré television transmitter built to accommodate channels 2 and 4 started in 1959 and the first experimental test transmission on the new frequency was held on July 4, 1960. The broadcast ran in two periods, and wouldn't be shown on channel 3 because this would cause interference. From July 16, the station started a gradual switchover process from the old Banespa transmitter to the new Sumaré one. The station effectively switched entirely to channel 4 on August 1. One of the slogans of the change in frequency was "Troque 3 x 4 e tenha satisfações a 3 x 4". Days after the shutdown of the former frequency, the transmitter was given to channel 2.

=== Cessation of local programming ===
At 4:21pm on May 2, 1980, the station ceased providing local programming, following a massive strike that saw two-thirds of its staff of 968 employees taking part. Some viewers were expecting a cut to a black screen, but instead an emergency solution happened, as technicians were already preparing for the usage of the Rio station as a backup. The frequency was reactivated a year later as a station of SBT.
