= Chatô, o Rei do Brasil =

- Theatrical release poster
- Directed by: Guilherme Fontes
- Written by: João Emanuel Carneiro; Matthew Robbins; Guilherme Fontes
- Based on: Chatô, o Rei do Brasil by Fernando Morais
- Starring: Marco Ricca; Andréa Beltrão; Paulo Betti; Leandra Leal; Eliane Giardini; Gabriel Braga Nunes
- Production company: Zoebra Filmes
- Release date: 19 November 2015
- Country: Brazil
- Language: Portuguese

Chatô, o Rei do Brasil (Note: Portuguese pronunciation: [ʃaˈto | u ʁej du bɾaˈziw].) is a Brazilian biographical comedy-drama film directed and produced by Guilherme Fontes, based on the book of the same name by Fernando Morais.

The film offers a romanticized portrayal of the life of Assis Chateaubriand (played by Marco Ricca), a media mogul from Paraíba who founded the Diários Associados empire. The story unfolds largely through Chateaubriand's delirious visions following a stroke, in which he imagines himself on trial during a prime-time Sunday TV special—confronted by former lovers and rivals seeking to settle old scores.

Production on the film began in 1995, with an initial planned release in 1997, later pushed to 1999. It was ultimately shelved that same year amid allegations that first-time director Guilherme Fontes had mishandled public funds intended for cinema and cultural projects. The production remained unfinished until it was finally completed and released in 2015.

== Plot ==
The narrative begins with Assis Chateaubriand suffering a stroke in 1960. From this point, the story traces his origins—from a poor childhood in Paraíba to his rise as a media magnate—while depicting Chatô's delusion of being put on trial during a television broadcast.

== Cast ==
- Marco Ricca as Assis Chateaubriand
- Andréa Beltrão as Vivi Sampaio
- Paulo Betti as Getúlio Vargas
- Leandra Leal as Lola
- Letícia Sabatella as Maria Eudóxia
- Eliane Giardini as Consuelo
- Gabriel Braga Nunes as Carlos Rosemberg
- Zezé Polessa as Germana de Almeida
- Liliana Castro as Ingrid Borgoin
- Marcos Oliveira as Teddy
- Ricardo Blat as Manuel
- Alexandre Régis as Afrânio
- José Lewgoy as General
- Walmor Chagas as General
- Guilherme Fontes as television presenter

== Production ==
Guilherme Fontes stated his intention in adapting the life of Assis Chateaubriand was to create a "Brazilian Forrest Gump" as well as "a musical tragicomedy, my personal strategy for, in the future, reinventing characters from Brazilian history and building a new dramaturgy." To realize this ambitious production, Fontes forged a partnership with Francis Ford Coppola's American Zoetrope. He established an office at the company's San Francisco headquarters and spent eight months discussing the project's technical, artistic, and promotional aspects, including several planned spin-offs such as the television documentaries Dossier Chatô and Five Days That Shook Brazil (covering Chateaubriand and the suicide of Getúlio Vargas, respectively) and a sitcom titled O Caudilho e o Jagunço, about the relationship between the two men. Zoebra Filmes was subsequently founded in July 1998 in the Jardim Botânico neighborhood of Rio de Janeiro.

The first draft of the screenplay was written by the filmmaker Carlos Gerbase. After passing through three other writers, the script was translated into English and sent to American Zoetrope. While receptive, the studio indicated a proper assessment required familiarity with the source material. In response, a team from the Instituto Alumni translated Fernando Morais's book within a week at a cost of US$20,000, sending it electronically to Zoetrope. After reviewing the book, the studio enlisted screenwriter Matthew Robbins to develop his own adaptation. Robbins traveled to Rio, studied the biography extensively while staying at the Copacabana Palace, and even visited Chateaubriand's hometown of Umbuzeiro in Paraíba before returning to Los Angeles to write. His version was subsequently adapted into the final shooting script by João Emanuel Carneiro.

=== Legal issues ===
On 22 February 2008, the Comptroller General of the Union (CGU) ordered Fontes and his business partner Yolanda Machado Medina Coeli—owners of Guilherme Fontes Filmes Ltda.—to return R$36.5 million to public funds. An audit had found irregularities in the company's accounts, prompting the case, which was brought forward by Ancine, the national cinema agency under the Ministry of Culture.

In a separate ruling, actor and director Guilherme Fontes was later sentenced to three years, one month, and six days in prison for tax evasion by Rio de Janeiro judge Denise Vaccari Machado Paes. However, the sentence was converted to seven hours of weekly community service for the same period, along with the donation of 12 basic food baskets (valued at R$1,000 each) to social institutions in Rio. The sentence, originally dated March 8, 2010, was published on April 8 and reported in the media on April 27. Fontes appealed the decision on April 19.

These legal proceedings stem from 1995, when Fontes's company began raising public funds to produce Chatô, o Rei do Brasil, his directorial debut, which ultimately took twenty years to complete. Through Rouanet Law and the Audiovisual Law, Fontes raised R$ 8.2 million. After the film release, the director said: "I raised 80% of the movie budget in the first three years and the remaining 20% in the later fifteen".

In 2014, Fontes faced another conviction, this time being ordered to return R$66.2 million to public coffers. In a public statement, he declared his intention to appeal, saying: "To my friends and fans, I say once again: I will fight any and all injustice against me. This appears to be yet another. But let's talk of brighter things: before Christmas, we will begin releasing the film. Starting in December, I'll host the first of ten official previews across Brazil." In addition to the restitution, he was also fined R$5 million.

== Reception ==
The critic Chico Fireman, writing for UOL, described the film as a "tropical Citizen Kane", calling it hysterical, almost histrionic, and delirious—mirroring the most striking traits of its protagonist, media magnate Assis Chateaubriand. Fireman emphasized the project's ambition, evident from the opening credits, and its "inherent sauciness"—not sexual, but a roguish, street-smart cheekiness that embodies a distinctly Brazilian cunning. He praised the art direction, non-linear editing, and agile narrative structure, which breaks free from the rigid mold of traditional biopics. Regarding the cast, he found Marco Ricca "exceptional" in the title role, balancing the character's explosive temperament without slipping into caricature, and highlighted strong performances from Andréa Beltrão, Paulo Betti, and Gabriel Braga Nunes. In closing, Fireman noted that although production began in 1999, the film remains strikingly relevant in its portrayal of political and media machinery, calling it "a film without a date, yet not dated"—a quality that unexpectedly complements the deliberate anachronism of its storytelling.
