= Edmundo Monteiro =

Brazilian journalist (1917–1996)

- Born: June 11, 1917; São Paulo
- Died: September 7, 1996 (aged 79)
- Occupations: journalist, politician

Edmundo Monteiro (June 11, 1917 – September 7, 1996) was a Brazilian journalist. He was a collaborator of Assis Chateaubriand, executive director of Diários Associados and president of the São Paulo Art Museum. He also had a period in politics, holding the position of federal deputy for São Paulo between 1967 and 1971.

== Biography ==
As a young man, Monteiro joined Diários Associados, the gigantic media conglomerate founded by Assis Chateaubriand in Rio de Janeiro in 1924. He started out as 'office boy' in the São Paulo offices, but, due to the volume of his work, he soon rose through the ranks. This drew the attention of Chateaubriand himself, who was known for directing favoured assistants to the administrative functions of his companies.

Monteiro graduated in economics at the Álvares Penteado School of Commerce.

He later became the general director of the radio stations in São Paulo, as well as of the newspapers Night Diary and São Paulo Diary. Then, in addition to São Paulo, he started to manage the Diários Associados divisions in Paraná and in Santa Catarina. He therefore commanded the most profitable units in the group, which would be fundamental for his involvement in Chateaubriand's plans to create a world-class museum in Brazil.
