= TV Brasília =

Brazilian television station

TV Brasília (ZYQ 809)
- Brasília, Federal District; Brazil
- Channels: Digital: 28 (UHF); Virtual: 6

Programming
- Affiliations: RedeTV!

Ownership
- Owner: Diários Associados (50%) Organizações Paulo Octávio (50%); (Rádio & Televisão CV Ltda.)

History
- Former call signs: ZYA 506 (1960–2016)
- Former affiliations: Record (1960–1981); SBT (1981–1985); Rede Manchete (1985–1999); RedeTV! (1999–present); Rede 21 (2003–2006); PlayTV (2006–2007)

Technical information
- Licensing authority: ANATEL

Links
- Public license information: Profile
- Website: www.tvbrasilia.com.br

TV Brasília (channel 6) is a Brazilian television station based in Brazilia, Distrito Federal. It operates on channel 6.1 (28 UHF), hosted by RedeTV!. The station is co-owned by the Brazilian media conglomerate Diarios Associados, and operates in association with Paulo Octavio Organizations. The channel's recording studios are located in the headquarters of Correio Braziliense newspaper company, in the Graphic Industry Sector with the rest of Diarios Associados' workspaces. The channel's transmittors are located in the Digital TV Tower of Brasilia, in the administrative region of Lago Norte.

The station was founded on April 21, 1960, by Assis Chateaubriand.

== History ==
=== Beginnings (1960–1972) ===
Assis Chateaubriand, founder of TV Brasília

While Brasília was being built, the federal government opened a bidding process for the three channels tuned-in to what was then the capital, Rio de Janeiro: one for the government, one for Pipa Amaral (TV Rio), and another for the Diários Associados. Assis Chateaubriand had promised President Kubitschek to build the Correio Braziliense and TV Brasília facilities in 100 days so they would be ready by the inauguration of the new capital, but completed construction four days ahead of schedule. The videotape device arrived from the United States on a PanAm cargo plane that landed in Rio de Janeiro; other equipment and employees were provided by TV Itapoan, TV Rádio Clube, and TV Piratini, all of them administered by Diários Associados.

The opening ceremony was presented by the British socialite Shelagh Parnell, starting at 8 pm on April 20, 1960. João Calmon and Gilberto Chateaubriand also spoke. TV Brasília was founded by the Diários Associados, on the night of April 21, 1960, the same date as the inauguration of the new federal capital. On the night of April 21, 1960, Diarios Associados founded TV Brasilia, TV Alvorada, and TV Nacional as well as Correio Braziliense, a newspaper owned by Diários Associados.

For the broadcast of the inauguration of the new capital, the Diários Associados decided to link Belo Horizonte to Brasilia, which had twelve microwave towers. Due to a last-minute malfunction with one of them, an airplane was used to reinstate the link and transmit the broadcast of the inauguration of Brasilia to the affiliate stations. TV Brasília started with a mission to record all the events of the new capital.

João Calmon declared that the television station would compensate the lack of theatres, cinemas, stadiums or nightlife in the city. He commented that TV Brasília would mitigate the city's monotony in its early years. Journalist Jairo Valladares was elected to be the director of TV Brasilia and served as construction manager while its facilities were being built. In a written statement from April 1962, he describes his routine between 1959 and 1960: "Accommodation, at the time, was only at Brasília Palace ... after half an hour of bumping around in a taxi we arrived, covered entirely by Brasília's red dust, like everything else at the time. We were young when we came in, and, later, others started joining".

Initially, Brasilia TV operated on channel 5, but switched to channel 6 in June 1960, where it is today. In the same year, writer Sylvia Orthof arrived to TV Brasília to produce the first children's program in the capital, Teatro do Candanguinho, which remained in the station's line-up until 1964.

TV Brasília produced a little more than 60% of its programming and, being one of the first channels in the country to have videotaping technology, also aired recordings from TV Tupi do Rio and São Paulo, as well as international programs. However, TV Brasilia only began to give credit to its affiliate channels for airing their programming in 1973, and until then had not recognized that the programming they broadcast was not their own.

In 1961, TV Brasília, as well as TV Alvorada and TV Nacional, received many requests to shutdown due to the conditions of the city at the time.

In the early 1960s, TV Brasília opened a branch in Taguatinga, which would later serve to produce content for remote populations. Early on, the station mostly broadcast in the evenings. The station consisted of 2 transmitters, a modular studio 300 square metres (3,200 ft^{2}) large, and an auditorium with 400 seats.

On August 1, 1961, the station launched its first daytime program, O Mundo é Das Mulheres (The World is for Women). The hosts were Zélia Marcondes and Renée Nunes, who gave tips on interior design, fashion, cuisine, beauty, astrology, and etiquette. The program's name was subject to criticism, so it was changed the following day to No Mundo das Mulheres (In the World of Women).

On the station's fourth anniversary on April 21, 1964, it debuted a new logo, slogan, and set. In the same year, Tele-Colégio Canal 6 was replaced by TV Escola, increasing its airtime. Flash Social could not be recorded on the week Castello Branco took power during the 1964 coup. All of the station's visual art was based on the capital's monuments, a concept that would be reused 50 years later in 2014. On Sunday, October 4, 1964, TV Brasília launched one of the first educational audio-programs in the Midwest. Created and presented by Wanderley Mattos, Nota Dez was a gameshow for elementary school students and had attractions such as prizes.

On January 15, 1966, due to flooding in the state of Guanabara, TV Brasília launched the campaign Rio, Brasília é Contigo and initiatives to help affected residents. Later, Correio Braziliense and Varig adopted the initiative. The station's lobby was used as a donation center, and donations were transported from there to Rio de Janeiro. The campaign to send supplies to Rio de Janeiro started a day early because of an overload in donations, causing Isto foi Notícia to continue overnight and the following day's schedule opened exceptionally early, at 10am.

In 1967, Carrossel premiered, which in its initial phase, presented by artist Darlan Rosa (Titio Darlan), told stories to children while he drew with his two hands simultaneously. Rosa commented, "I am not ambidextrous, but my left hand mirrors my right. I made this up just to pay tribute to the mirrored city."

=== Local consolidation (1968–1973) ===
In January 1968, TV Brasília launched the commercial-free Linha Direta, where there would be no commercials in its airing.

At the request of the artistic director at the time, Emílio Cerri, on June 15, 1968, TV Brasília broadcast Elis Especial, which featured singer Elis Regina performing for the benefit of the Festa dos Estados.

In 1969, TV Brasília invested heavily in its art department and launched successful programs with high local approval, such as A Caminho da Grande Chance, which was rated highly by the Brazilian Institute of Public Opinion and Statistics.

On April 1, 1970, the station launched Seis no Lance, presented by Nilson Nelson at 12:45pm. The daily sports program included appearances from key players and replayed highlights of soccer matches. It was unique for its calm, slow-paced atmosphere.

=== Tupi Network phase (1972–1980) ===
On September 1, 1972, TV Brasília was the first in the Federal District to broadcast in color. Two years later, TV Brasília aired the Miss Brazil contest.

In 1973, TV Brasília recorded chapters of Mulheres de Areia. According to Ivani Ribeiro, filming conditions in the coastline forced the author to think of a travel of its central characters to the Planalto region. The change in landscape would have better health for its actors of a drama which was intended to have the coastline of the state of São Pauol, with its violent and fearful winter.

On September 17, 1973, TV Brasília added another sports show to its schedule: Raça e Técnica, aired on Mondays, from 11:30pm. The station's sports department was directed by Nilson Nelson at the time and had the participation of Jorge Martins, as commentator, Marcus Vinícius, as field reporter, and Joaquim Santos and Hélio Nunes as cameramen. The new program featured a fistful of news from sports and with the "rain of goals" the supporter likes to watch. For its first edition, its guests were Rogério and CEUB director Jesus Peres, as well as Sílvio de Carvalho, of FDB's Referee Department. Otávio Bariloche took part as an invited journalist. One week later, Jairzinho, from Botafogo, was the interviewee. From the start of the show, supporters of the local soccer scene watched footage of CEUB's matches in the Brazilian Championship, inside and outside DF. Still in 1973, Nilson Nelson and Jorge Martins created Comandando a Loteca, giving betting tips for Loteria Esportiva. New to the program was an astrologist who talked about the clubs' star signs and their influences.

From 1973 to 1985, TV Brasília held, at Ginásio de Esportes Presidente Médici, the Miss Brasil pageant and networked it to Rede Tupi and later SBT. The move of the event from Rio to Brasília was motivated by the fall in public which saw it at Maracanãzinho.

Until 1980, the station was part of the Tupi Network and one of the few that escaped the revocation by the military dictatorship of the Tupi stations in São Paulo, Rio de Janeiro, Belém, Belo Horizonte, Fortaleza, Porto Alegre, and Recife. In order to avoid its shutdown, its staff made a hunger strike. Its license wasn't revoked owing to its influence, but because it was set to expire on September 27, 1981 if it wasn't renewed. The station belonged to several people linked to the Diários Associados. During this period, it produced the children's program Carrossel in collaboration with TV Goyá de Goiânia. To avoid the channel's shutdown, its workers held a hunger strike.

After the closure of the Tupi Network, along with other affiliates, the station began to air REI (Rede de Emissoras Independentes) programming, led by TV Record and TVS do Rio.

=== After the Tupi network closure (1980–1993) ===
In August 1980, the program Brasília Urgente premiered. It was the highest-viewed program in the federal capital from 1980 to 1987. Several journalists made their debuts during this time, including Ana Paula Padrão, Giuliana Morrone, and Márcia Witczak.

With the emergence of SBT, TV Brasília became one of its main affiliates from 1981 until 1985, when the São Paulo broadcaster obtained a concession for channel 12. TV Brasília joined the former Rede Manchete, becoming its main affiliate in 1985.

In 1989, there was a fire at the station's headquarters and, as a result, a large part of its collection was lost.

From 1991 until 2003 the station was headquartered in the graphic-industry sector of the annex building of Correio Braziliense, headquarters of the Diários Associados in Brasília. It produced network news such as Brasil 7:30 (later Telemanhã) in addition to Telemanchete, a local news program.

=== New phase of the Diários Associados in Brasília (1993–1997) ===
In 1993, together with the rest of the Diários Associados in Brasília, TV Brasília was also standardized visually.

In 1994, for the first time in the broadcaster's history, the World Cup was not shown per Rede Manchete's decision.

In November 1995, the broadcaster was sold to then-Minister of Agriculture and owner of Banco Bamerindus, José Eduardo de Andrade Vieira, who had a 49% stake in Central Nacional de Televisão (CNT). He then sold his share of CNT, and TV Brasília returned to the Diários Associados. The partnership lasted until 1999, following the bankruptcy of Rede Manchete. TV Brasília transitioned to TV!, then RedeTV! until June 2003.

=== Attempted revitalization and crisis (1997–2001) ===
At the beginning of 1997, TV Brasília launched a new image. Programs such as Repórter da Cidade (later Brasilia News) and Telemanhã were made more dynamic, and popular programs with audience participation were launched, such as BSB Radical and Cor da Cidade. According to Folha de São Paulo, in 1995 TV Brasília was in 4th place in number of viewers in the Federal District.

In early 1999, TV Brasília was affected by the TV Manchete crisis, when it was sold to Renascer em Cristo, leading to its local programming being reduced and replaced with independent programs. With the launch of RedeTV!, TV Brasília changed the format, graphics, and scenery of its programs. The change soon brought positive results; however, the economic situation in which the Diários Associados found themselves soon intensified and the station was forced to end its local programming.

=== Paulo Octávio phase (2001–2008) ===
On June 21, 2001, the station was purchased by businessman and politician Paulo Octávio. Negotiation at the time was possible because the broadcaster was one of the few active properties of the Diários Associados that was free from the judicial constraint brought by Gilberto Chateaubriand. At the time, it had 15 employees and did not run any of its own programs. The second half of that year was dedicated to enabling the company to face its future challenges. Little by little new programs were introduced and the first one was Agenda Brasília, an interview program that focused on general issues and that debuted on September 10. Some time later Agenda Brasília was scheduled for the end of the morning. The program was presented by Adeline Delgado and remained on the air until the beginning of 2003. An employment and education program was launched on December 4, 2001, where Paulo Octávio talked with businessmen in the capital. On April 27, 2002, Oficina Mix premiered; it was a program that was less than a year on the air and was presented by Carolina Monte Rosa. Oficina Mix broadcast interviews, musicals, and varied reports. Journalism returned in April of the same year with Canal 6 Notícias, presented by journalist Sandra Amaral, who presented the newscast on her feet, not from behind a desk. Before, in January, Barra Pesada was presenting again after a year off the air, and in the same year TV Brasília launched Auto Giro, which developed a successful format that ran for 12 years in a row. It hosted the only electronic magazine in the automobile sector in the Federal District to the present day, called Vrum.

On the night of the counting of the second round of the 2002 elections, the station was the only one that broadcast information, in real time, the course of the dispute between the two main candidates for the government of the Federal District. It combined interviews with giving accurate information. Only this station, live, with intense participation from viewers, remained on the air for eight consecutive hours, resulting in record audiences and high approval from the public.

In June 2003, surprising the advertising market, the broadcaster left RedeTV!, and became the first affiliate of the recently created Rede 21 of Grupo Bandeirantes de Comunicação, which until then had focused only on Greater São Paulo. The partnership resulted in a more quality in the schedule, but with less commercial return. Their purpose for television was for it to become a reference in local journalism, seeking to be such a vehicle of the Brasiliense par excellence. In pursuit of this, four daily news programs were shown. O Wake up Brasília, at 8:00 am, Jornalocal - 1st Edition, at 12:30 pm Jornalocal, at 7:00 pm, and Jornalocal - Night Edition, at 1:30 am. In addition, the broadcaster worked with Rede 21 on Jornal 21, a national news program. TV Brasília also showed Manchete da Hora - nine daily inserts with breaking news in the capital.

On April 21, 2004, TV Brasília inaugurated its new headquarters in the Northern Hotel Sector in Brasília, which it used until February 2014. Also in that year, the television news program Accorda Brasília, was presented by Camila Bonfim in the mornings, and the Conteudo, by Arthur Luís, a presenter who years later would return to the station to present Clube TV.

In 2005, TV Brasília started to stream its programming and that of Rede 21 over the internet. In the following year, it followed Rede 21, which changed its name to PlayTV and is managed by Gamecorp, linked to one of the sons of then President Lula, and then returning to Rede 21 in 2008. In the first months of 2005, the network ran only five hours of programming, from 7 pm to midnight. Most of the network schedule was made up of American serials and anime and where independent and infomercial programs are not shown, unlike TV Brasília, which, as the affiliate, puts on local programs, which often led in audience ratings. 2005 marked the launch of new programs such as the children's Brasilia Animada presented at the time by Heloísa Bomtempo, the video program Turbinado with Flávia Aleixo, and the Session of the Two showing films that the public chose in addition to commentary by the journalist Sérgio de Sá and, later, by Márcio Machado. Other programs were launched during the year such as Tempos Modernos, Alta Frequência (a musical presented by Paloma Lopes with concerts by international artists), Art Mix, Vitrine Capital (presented by Lana Canepa), Debate Capital (with Kido Guerra), and the sports program A Grande Jogada (with Domingos Melo).

On June 5, 2006, following the change of Rede 21 to PlayTV, controlled by Gamecorp, affiliation that lasted until 2007, when it chose not to follow the PlayTV schedule and to have its own programming. As of May 7, 2007, when it started showing a schedule with local programs, Terra Viva programs, news editions from the BandNews TV, and BandSports channels, keeping only two PlayTV programs on air: O Jornal 10 and O Otacraze Block; with this, TV Brasília became an independent broadcaster, that is, without having a defined national programming schedule.

=== Return to the Diários Associados and RedeTV! (2008–2014) ===
On January 23, 2008, through TV Alterosa, the Diários Associados, belonging to the Paulo Octávio group, acquired a 50% ownership share of TV Brasília. With the transaction, TV Alterosa controlled the management of the business and the editorial policies of the broadcaster. With the return of TV Brasília to the Diários Associados after seven years, the group completed its media mix in the Federal District, where it already maintained the newspapers Correio Braziliense and Aqui DF, the Correio web portal, in addition to Rádio Planalto and Clube FM. The return of TV Brasília to the Diários Associados took place based on a strategy where the idea was to do in Brasilia the same thing as happened in Minas, with the integration of the group's companies and the communication between TV, radio, internet, and print newspapers. The negotiation was part of the expansion strategy of the Diários Associados, dedicated to making partnerships and societies in the states where it operates. Luis Eduardo Leão, technical manager of TV Alterosa, assumed the position of general manager of TV Brasília. The channel continued to belong to the Paulo Octávio organizations, which held 50% of the ownership shares, with the other 50% returning to the Associated Diaries that edit the Correio Braziliense. The sale was signed on the afternoon of January 23, by the representative of Paulo Octavio, Anna Christina Kubitschek Pereira, and by the president of the Courier, Álvaro Teixeira da Costa. On May 29, the RedeTV! affiliation agreement was signed in the presence of the network's president, Amílcare Jr., the president of the Correio Braziliense newspaper, Álvaro Teixeira, and the vice-governor of the DF, Octávio Frias, with TV Brasília, at the headquarters of Correio Braziliense. The signing, which took place in the afternoon, was shown in the evening on RedeTV! News and Dynamic Reading. So, in June 2008, the broadcaster was once again affiliated with RedeTV!, after five years absence. During this period, RedeTV! was represented by the Brazilian branch of Rede União, on channel 56. After 2006, there was no open signal in the Federal District; with that it was only possible to tune in to RedeTV!, pay TV, or satellite dish.

On July 8, a party held at the Ilha das Tribos space, in Brasília, officially marking the beginning of the partnership between RedeTV! and TV Brasília, which started to retransmit RedeTV!'s signal at different times. With the new schedule, TV Brasília's programming gained national coverage. Brasília is one of the cities with the worst performance in terms of regionalization of programming, reaching an average of 6.61% according to the study of the Observatory on the Right to Communication (2009). The only broadcaster in the capital that surpassed the national average was TV Brasília, with 11% of local content broadcast. The other broadcasters, affiliated with the four largest networks, maintain much lower rates: RecordTV (8.48%), Globo (5.75%), Band (4.76%), and SBT (3%).

In February 2009, TV Brasília changed its local prime time schedule and started showing Notícias das 7, which due to its low ratings, would be canceled three months later. In August, the broadcaster started to show the program Antônio Roberto e Você, which was also being shown on TV Alterosa in Minas Gerais, which also belongs to the Diários Associados. At the end of 2009, TV Brasília reformulated the Esporte show, now presented by Bruno Mendes, and now has greater prominence in football. It used the formula Democratic Bench that is used successfully in the programs Alterosa Esporte (on TV Alterosa / SBT in Minas Gerais) and in Superesportes (on TV stations Borborema affiliated with SBT, in Campina Grande / PB, and TV Clube affiliated with Rede Record, in Recife / PE).

On June 20, 2010, the broadcaster launched a campaign in celebration of fifty years, with the slogan "A TV that sees the city in its own way".

The capital of the State of Goiás (Goiânia), since July 2011, started to receive the signal from TV Brasilia through channel 21 UHF and also through channel 22 of NET. On November 14, the broadcaster premiered the police program DF Alerta, presented by Fred Linhares, which became an audience phenomenon, reaching absolute success according to Ibope's assessment.

In September 2013, due to the change in the local midday schedule, the Bola Dividida program started to be shown at 6:00 pm.

=== New headquarters and reformulation (2014–present) ===
On February 17, 2014, TV Brasília launched a new program, Super Local Band, and its studios, being officially opened on April 29, were again located at the headquarters of the Associated Diaries in the graphics industry sector of the city. On February 19, police reporter Raphael Britto of the DF Alerta program died of kidney failure. On March 10, the program Clube TV, presented by Arthur Luís from Clube FM, premiered, which has community journalism, variety, presentation by national artists when they are doing shows in the Federal District, raffle tickets for musical shows, and exhibition of hit recordings on Rádio Clube FM. With its success, the program format was implemented at TV Clube, an affiliate of RecordTV in Recife / PE with the program Agora é Hora. At the end of November, the broadcaster led in ratings in the lunch hour, called Super Local Band, with the programs Jornal Local, DF Alerta, and Clube TV, in competition with TV Globo Brasília, RecordTV Brasília, and SBT Brasília.

In 2015, TV Brasília started broadcasting its local programming live via Correio Web and mobile applications. On February 23, the broadcaster canceled Jornal Local 2nd Edition, and changed Jornal Local's hours, as well as several others whose slots were to be occupied by independent programs. This came about through the repositioning of TV Brasilia in order to encourage third-party content. and regional producers. On August 17, the political talk show CB.Poder premiered, in partnership with the newspaper Correio Braziliense, and presented by Simone Souto. On December 20, 2015, Clube TV was chosen as the best local program in Brazil by the website Na Telinha / Uol, surpassing the program A Bahia Que a Gente Likes shown on RecordTV Itapoan.

On January 10, 2016, the program Vrum Brasília premiered, presented by Clayton Sousa. In April, there were changes to the station's Super Local Track, with the program DF Alerta now shown at 11:45 am (cutting the final 15 minutes of Best for You), and the local news at 1:10 pm. In July, Clube TV ceased to be shown by the broadcaster, and broadcaster Arthur Luis started to present only at Clube FM and in the artistic management of the radio stations of the Diários Associados in the Federal District. On September 19, the broadcaster relaunched the 2nd edition of Jornal Local, presented by João Fagundes.

Starting in February 2017, DF Alerta was introduced on an interim basis by reporter Rodrigo Lemes, the day after Fred Linhares was hired by RecordTV Brasília. A month later, Nikole Lima became the new host of the program, while Wagner Relâmpago went on to make police comments. In March of the following year, the program O Conciliador, with Todi Moreno, premiered. The program was a simple conflict resolution tool in which the parties seek to resolve their issues with the assistance of conciliator Todi Moreno (former director of Procon / DF).

On November 14, 2019, the broadcaster signed a contract to broadcast the Candango Football Championship, in ten years's time. Until then, TV Globo Brasília held the championship rights.

In January 2020, journalist Paula Lobão left the station. On February 2, the broadcaster started broadcasting the National Alert program of TV A Crítica in partnership with RedeTV!, being one of the affiliates with greater participation in the journalistic side. In April of the same year, due to the COVID-19 pandemic, TV Brasília chose to show some programs directly from the home of their presenters, programs such as Vrum, DF Alerta, and others. Some presenters recorded videos on the station's social networks, encouraging viewers to comply with social distancing.

On April 21, 2020, Brasilia TV presented a celebration of Pedro Paulo and Matheus in celebration of the sixtieth anniversary of the broadcaster and the capital, integrated with the internet and social networks, and on the same day, earlier, a special edition of Jornal Local was shown, also in commemoration of the station's and capital's sixtieth anniversary. That day A Tarde é Sua was preempted and the time given to Universal Church, ending at 6 pm on the television program National Alert, while on the social networks of the broadcaster and on YouTube going until 6:30 pm. The 3rd edition of TV Brasília Run, which would take place in May 2020, was canceled due to the pandemic.

On July 13, 2020, Nikole Lima left TV Brasília after signing a contract with RecordTV Brasília. The following day, the journalist Wagner Relâmpago, who was in his home office, took over the presentation of DF Alerta. On June 18, 2020, the journalist Jéssica Nascimento, who worked in the reporting team of Jornal Local, announced her departure from TV Brasília and also went on to RecordTV Brasília. On July 21, Rachel Castro, who directed DF Alerta left the station to go to SBT Brasília. In August, the journalist Bruno Fonseca (known as Brunoso) was hired to present DF Alerta, after a year on TV A Crítica de Manaus, where he presented the journalist Alerta Nacional. Still in 2020, TV Brasília launched the reality show Os Infiltrados Brasília, which was the first reality show to be made in the federal capital, and Vrum Brasília, which, after 4 years on the air is now called Vrum again, as it was at the time of its showing on Alterosa TV. And still in 2020, TV Brasília ended the production of Momento CBV and Vitrine Gastrô.

In the first quarter of 2021, Chef Vinícius Rossignolli announced that he would switch from TV Brasília to TV Bandeirantes Brasília.

== Visual branding ==
Initially the station had no logo, while it was tuned to VHF 5, because when changing channels in June 1960 the station started to use its name as a logo, but with the 6 highlighted within a screen. In 1961, already on Channel 6, the station had a version of the Indian of TV Tupi, differentiated from other affiliates; but in 1962 it started to follow the aesthetic standard of São Paulo.

In 1963, TV Brasília used a logo where Channel 6 had an iris of the eye in the shape of a 6, it was used in conjunction with that of 1962.

In April 1964, the Indian logo returned, but this time with a square and flat face, he remained on the station's facade until 1974. The station's vignettes at that time were set among the monuments of Brasília.

In 1968, TV Brasília improved its Indian child, who now gains a body and voice and interacted in the advertising pieces and vignettes of the broadcaster, representing the federal capital.

In 1973, one year after the formation of the Tupi Network, its logo became the same as that of the network, consisting of two interwoven lines and three spheres—colored blue, red, and green—that remained until 1977. In 1975 a similar logo was used, to that of the network.

In 1977, the broadcaster used a stylized weathervane as a logo, but, due to poor public reception, they soon returned to the 1973 logo, only with bigger waves and the colors reordered to red, green, and blue. In 1978, TV Brasília used the same stylized T from the network, however, inside a screen.

Due to the demise of the Tupi Television Network, TV Brasília remained without a logo from July 20, 1980, until December 8, 1980.

At the end of 1980, the station had a logo, made by Cyro Del Nero, which represented the number 6 stylized in RGB colors and with its own typography, inspired by Brasilia's different architecture. In 1985, shortly after the broadcaster joined Rede Manchete, the previous logo gained an alternative version, with rounded ends. It was no longer used after the 1989 fire.

On March 1, 1993, TV Brasília adopted the standard logo of the Diários Associados, which was also used by Rádio Planalto, 105 FM, TV Goiânia, and Correio Braziliense at the time.

On April 20, 1997, in commemoration of 37 years of TV Brasília, a sphere with the map of Brasilia was used, in reference to the name of the broadcaster. Along with the new brand, a new visual identity was adopted, completely redesigned; and, in line with the trends of the time and the "Must see" slogan that was used by the broadcaster, the vignette of the time showed people opening the camera lens in Brasilia and making a gesture of looking. In December 1999, with the arrival of RedeTV!, the logo underwent subtle updates. That logo was maintained until 2002, one year after Organizações Paulo Octávio acquired 100% ownership.

In 2002, already belonging to the Organizações Paulo Octávio, TV Brasília started to use the name "Canal 6" more than its own, in order to signal to the viewer that the company had changed owner and objectives. The number 6 became the symbol in an attempt to become more popular in the market. All programs, brands, and its visual identity in general were updated, with no memory of the time when the station was owned by the Associated Diaries; the logo became a simple 6, changing the traditional blue color to a golden yellow. The solution proved to be problematic because TV Brasília operated on different channels in different cities in Brasília.

On June 1, 2003, the broadcaster became the first affiliate of the recently created Rede 21 of Grupo Bandeirantes de Comunicação, and with this new era, a new visual identity was developed, highly contemporary and aligned with the market of the time. The solution, therefore, was to fix TV Brasília and not the channel. Ruth Reis, who was part of Rede Globo's creative teams, accepted the challenge: with a logo with a spiral that circulates around the force radiating pole and the center that signifies broadcasting information. In other words, showing TV Brasília and its relationship with the cities of the Federal District. New news, police, sports, entertainment, and even humorous video series were launched, The visual identity was credited to Ruth Reis, Toni Lucena, and Rubens Duarte, and latterly to Aguinaldo Abreu and Diego Brandão.

In 2008, TV Brasília partially returned to Diários Associados; and, in July of the same year, it became affiliated again with RedeTV!. Therefore, in October 2008, the previous logo was updated, gaining a more "flat" and less three-dimensional appearance. In the following year, its programs were visually modified and in April 2010, with the celebration of the 50th anniversary of the channel, a new vignette, a ringing sound, and a new slogan was launched: "TV that sees the city in its own way".

On February 17, 2014, TV Brasília returned to the headquarters of the Diários Associados in Brasília, and launched its new programming, completely redesigned with new studios, sets, and equipment, together with the launch of its new logo that alludes to 1997, only that it now represented the map of Brasilia through 3 screens, with the colors of Brazil, that together form the original design of Lúcio Costa, a modified version to that used in the 60s, from February to July 2020.

== Broadcast range ==
TV Brasília's broadcast signal reaches all cities in the Federal District through channel 6.1 (28 UHF), and to the satellite city of Sobradinho through channel 29 UHF, in addition to reaching some cities in the state of Goiás, some surrounding Brasília, (Valparaíso, Alexânia, Águas Lindas de Goiás, Formosa, Planaltina de Goiás, Padre Bernardo, Mimoso de Goiás, Novo Gama, Cristalina, and Luziânia), and also through a repeater in Goiânia GO on 21 UHF in the capital. The station can also be tuned in Brasília through Claro TV on channel 18, in Goiás through Claro TV on channel 25, and through Vivo TV on channel 517 in DF, Goiás, and Entorno.
