= Organizações Paulo Octávio =

Organizations Paulo Octavio is a conglomerate of companies belonging to Paulo Octávio, founded in 1975 with headquarters in Brasília, Federal District, concentrated specifically in the areas of construction, real estate, hotels, shopping centers, insurance, consortium and communication.

== Hotels ==
- Brasília Alvorada Hotel
- Brasília Palace Hotel
- Kubitschek Plaza Hotel
- Manhattan Plaza Hotel
- Saint Paul Hotel
- Studio In Residence

== Shopping centers ==
- Brasília Shopping
- Taguatinga Shopping
- Terraço Shopping

== Marketing ==
- Office C

== Radio ==
- JK FM
- Mix FM Brasília
- Radio Globo Brasília
- Rádio Bandeirantes Brasília

== Television ==
TV Brasília (in partnership with the Diários Associados)

== Consortium ==
- CTM Bali

== Insurance ==
- Terrace Insurance Brokers

== Construction ==
- Home Construction

== Property ==
- Paulo Octavio Real Estate
