= Triste Fim de Policarpo Quaresma =

1915 book by Lima Barreto

The Sad End of Policarpo Quaresma
- Author: Lima Barreto
- Original title: Triste Fim de Policarpo Quaresma
- Language: Portuguese
- Genre: Novel
- Publisher: Typ. "Revista dos Tribunaes"
- Publication date: 1915
- Publication place: Brazil
- Pages: 352 p.
- Preceded by: As Aventuras do Doutor Bogóloff
- Followed by: Numa e a Ninfa

Triste Fim de Policarpo Quaresma (published in English as The Patriot and The Sad End of Policarpo Quaresma) is a novel by Pre-Modernist Brazilian writer Lima Barreto. The work was published under feuilleton form in 1911, from August to October in the Jornal do Commercio. The focus of the work is the nationalism in the early years of the First Brazilian Republic and criticism to the middle-class and the bureaucratic government. The work is comical in the beginning, transiting to harsh criticisms by the end. These critics demystify the figure of the president Floriano Peixoto (1891–1894), known as the Marechal de Ferro ("Iron Marshal"), and also of the Brazilian military.

The book is centered on Policarpo Quaresma, an ultra-nationalist bureaucrat of the Army. Quaresma is an enthusiast of Brazilian popular and indigenous culture, and has an innocent love for his country. Throughout the story, his heightened patriotism leads him always to disastrous situations: in the first part, he ends in an asylum; in the second, his agricultural enterprise fails due to the Brazilian pests and soil; and in the third and final part, he is arrested and executed under the orders of Floriano Peixoto, whom he admired.

== Plot ==
=== Part One ===
The whole first part takes place in Rio de Janeiro. Quaresma is shown as a wise, but naïve nationalist who spent years of his life in private studies on Brazil. After 30 years, he finally found the right time to put in action his plan for improvement of Brazilian government and society.

Quaresma is fluent in French, English and German, learning the Tupi language and how to play the guitar; however, he only reads works of Brazilian authors or foreign authors whose works were about Brazil. His favorite authors were those who were considered the most patriotic: José de Alencar and Gonçalves Dias.

He is seen as eccentric by his neighbors. Lima Barreto shows Quaresma's neighbors as pedant and mediocre people, a criticism of the urban society of late 19th century. For example, the shallow relationships between the daughter of General Albernaz, Ismênia, and her fiancé. She appears to be a disinterested girl who thinks that the only purpose in life for a woman is to find a husband; her fiancé is a man who is lauded just because he finished college.

General Albernaz, who is a neighbor of Quaresma, is a miserable man: in spite of his high title, he never fought a single battle. He lies about military deeds, and in fact, he only achieved generalship because of his many years in service. Other characters are seen as purely mediocre: none of them has real value and are bureaucrats.

Quaresma's plan is soon put in action: he sends a requirement to the Brazilian Chamber of Deputies requesting a change in the official language of Brazil. He wanted the Tupi language, which is indigenous and pure Brazilian, in the place of Portuguese, since Portuguese was "imported" from the European settlers. Quaresma was seen as crazy by the press and was harshly satirized. To worsen the situation, Quaresma accidentally sent a document in Tupi to the Ministry, and was fired.

The story continues in an asylum, where Quaresma was sent after these events. However, his friend Coleoni and his goddaughter Olga still believed in him and his plan.

=== Part Two ===
The second part of the book illustrates the struggles of the rural properties in Brazil.

Healthy and retired, Quaresma is convinced by Olga to sell his house and buy a countryside estate. He tries to prove the fertility and richness of Brazilian soil, which was so praised by the Portuguese in the letter of discovery sent to the Portuguese king in the 1500s.

Quaresma's plan was to promote the agricultural development of Brazil, in hopes of bringing economical growth to the country. However, his property is infested by sauva ants, invasive plants and succumbs to weather. In spite of his efforts, the property fails. In addition, he sees himself dealing with the small mentality and defamation by the town's politicians and people, who cannot understand his political neutrality.

In the end, Quaresma abandons his property to go support the President in Rio against the Navy.

=== Part Three ===
The last part is the climax of the book. During the Second Naval Revolt (Segunda Revolta da Armada), Quaresma is finally disappointed by the crude reality of the Brazilian government. When the revolt erupts, Quaresma takes President Floriano Peixoto's side and quickly comes back to Rio, to help the President in the confrontation.

Upon his arrival in the capital, Quaresma is received by Floriano Peixoto, and brings him a document on difficulties of the national agriculture. However, Peixoto pays no attention to the document.

As a supporter of the regime, Quaresma is put in charge of a squad, albeit his lack of military experience. In his squad, many of the soldiers had been forced to enlist, including his friend and guitar teacher, Ricardo Coração-dos-Outros (this character's last name is actually a pun, meaning "Heart-of-others").

Quaresma becomes deeply disappointed when he sees the violence of the regime and its arbitrary acts. He soon realizes Peixoto's contempt about him and becomes even more disappointed when he kills one of the rebels.

When the revolt is subdued, Quaresma is put in charge of prisoners. At that point, all his illusions about Brazil had vanished. After seeing the unfair executions and cruelties committed against the prisoners, he sends a letter exposing the situation to the President. The President, who actually had ordered those crimes, accuses Quaresma of treason and arrests him.

Quaresma's goddaughter and Ricardo try to save him, but are not successful. In the end, all his projects failed: his attempt to make Tupi language official, the agricultural enterprise and his trust on the Brazilian government. Quaresma is finally executed by the President he admired, and for the sake of the country he loved.
