= 2009 Brazilian girl abortion case =

2009 incident in Brazil

In 2009, a 9-year-old Brazilian girl was repeatedly raped by her stepfather and became pregnant with twins; the girl's mother helped her procure an abortion, and the pregnancy was terminated. José Sobrinho, a Catholic archbishop, said that the girl's mother and the doctors who performed the abortion had been automatically excommunicated under canon law. This prompted an array of national and international criticism for the archbishop's actions. In response, the National Conference of Bishops of Brazil declared that no one was excommunicated in the case, and in an article published in L'Osservatore Romano, a bioethicist of the Holy See rebuked the archbishop for his public statement.

== Law ==
=== Brazilian penal law ===
Abortion is legal under Brazilian law in cases of pregnancies resulting from rape or in which giving birth would endanger the mother's life.

=== Canon law ===
The 1983 Code of Canon Law says that latae sententiae excommunication is incurred by "a person who procures a completed abortion" (Canon 1398), but not if, for instance, the act was done "by a person who was coerced by grave fear, even if only relatively grave, or due to necessity or grave inconvenience unless the act is intrinsically evil or tends to the harm of souls".

== The abortion ==
The girl had been raped over a period of four years by her stepfather. After she was found to be pregnant with twins, doctors in Recife judged her life to be at risk because of her age, her weight at 80 pounds (36 kg), and because she was pregnant with twins. According to Fatima Maia, the director of the hospital CISAM, if the pregnancy continued, the child could suffer a ruptured uterus and hemorrhage, and she also ran the risk of diabetes, hypertension, eclampsia and lifelong sterility. The doctors completed the abortion of the twin fetuses on 4 March 2009.

== Sobrinho's view and actions ==
Sobrinho said that excommunication of the adults who helped the girl obtain the abortion and the doctor who performed it had been incurred by the act of the girl obtaining an abortion. He later said he himself had not excommunicated anyone, but had only determined that excommunication had been an automatic consequence of these actions. He said that "the law of God is higher than any human laws. When a human law—that is, a law enacted by human legislators—is against the law of God, that law has no value. The adults who approved, who carried out this abortion have incurred excommunication." In an interview, he added: "They took the life of an innocent. Abortion is much more serious than killing an adult. An adult may or may not be an innocent, but an unborn child is most definitely innocent. Taking that life cannot be ignored." Sobrinho further said that the rapist had not been excommunicated because abortion, the taking of an innocent life, is even worse than rape. The girl had not been excommunicated because minors are exempt from excommunication. Archbishop Sobrinho and his diocese also tried to prevent the abortion by approaching the child's parents, the State Governor and the hospital where she was first admitted, after which it put off the abortion indefinitely. His lawyers then also issued legal threats against a second hospital where the abortion finally took place.

== Government reaction ==
President Luiz Inácio Lula da Silva criticized what he called the "conservative attitude" of the archbishop in a case where the doctors said they were trying to save the girl's life, adding: "In this case, the medical profession was more right than the Church."

Health Minister José Gomes Temporão described what he called the Catholic Church's position as "extreme, radical and inadequate". Temporão, who had frequently clashed with the Church on questions such as abortion and state distribution of free condoms, called on the participants in a national convention on women's health to acknowledge the work done by the medical team who performed the abortion.

== Church hierarchy's view ==
=== National Conference of Bishops of Brazil ===
The National Conference of Bishops of Brazil repudiated Sobrinho's initiative. At a press conference, Bishop Dimas Lara Barbosa, Secretary General of the Conference, said that the girl's mother was not excommunicated, since she had acted under pressure to save her daughter's life, and that there were no grounds to declare the doctors excommunicated, because (automatic) excommunication depended on each one's degree of awareness and only those who were "aware and contumacious" were excommunicated. At the press conference, journalists received a document on excommunication written by canonist Enrique Pérez Pujol, who stressed that the penalty should not be applied amid a polemic.

Archbishop Geraldo Lyrio Rocha, president of the conference, avoided answering a question whether Sobrinho had acted hastily in saying that automatic excommunication had occurred. He said that "at no time did he want to hurt someone who was already hurting, but only wished to draw attention to the gravity of the deed of abortion in the face of a certain permissiveness regarding the life of the unborn". He said that Sobrinho had excommunicated no one, but had said that abortion entails the possibility of excommunication, which is a measure intended to make not only an individual but the whole Church community take note of the gravity of the deed. As for the rapist, he said that a rapist "is outside of communion" and "in grave mortal sin", even though rape is not listed among the crimes that give rise to automatic excommunication. He said: "Rape is something so repugnant that the Church does not need to call attention to it. It is punished by the state justice system, which does not punish abortion so much." He said that talk of excommunication seemed to have made people forget the crime of the rapist, who needed to be punished.

=== Rino Fisichella ===
The Holy See's unofficial newspaper, L'Osservatore Romano, published a front page article on 15 March 2009 by Rino Fisichella, President of the Pontifical Academy for Life, that was highly critical of Sobrinho's action. Fisichella said that excommunication was automatic, so that focusing on it rather than on helping and supporting the child victim showed a lack of compassion that detracted from the credibility of the Church's anti-abortion teaching. After reiterating the Church's condemnation of abortion, he wrote that the moral situation was difficult because of the girl's young age and the risk to her life and praised those who "allowed [her] to live and will help [her] to recover hope and trust". He wrote: "The conscience of the physician finds itself alone when forced to decide the best thing to do. A choice like that of having to save a life, knowing that one puts a second at serious risk, never comes easily."

The Congregation for the Doctrine of the Faith responded to press coverage of Fisichella's article calling it manipulation and exploitation. It issued a clarification that the article did not signal a change of doctrine and said that "the Church's teaching on procured abortion has not changed, nor can it change". The clergy of the archdiocese of Olinda and Recife took issue with Fisichella, stating that the local church had been supportive of the girl and her mother. The Congregation for the Doctrine of the Faith ruled that Sobrinho had acted "with all pastoral solicitude". The members of the Academy gave Fisichella a vote of no confidence because of his article, and he was reassigned in the next year to the Pontifical Council for Promoting the New Evangelization.

=== Others ===
Giovanni Battista Re, Prefect of the Congregation for Bishops and President of the Pontifical Commission for Latin America, deplored what he called an attack on the Church in Brazil: "It is a sad case, but the real problem is that the twins conceived were two innocent persons, who had the right to live and could not be eliminated. Life must always be protected. The attack on the Brazilian church is unjustified." He added that excommunication of those who performed the abortion was just. The National Conference of Bishops of Brazil declared the archbishop's statement mistaken.

Bishop Jean-Michel di Falco of Gap, France, criticized what he saw as the un-Christlike nature of Sobrinho's statement. He said that bishops should act as pastors rather than executioners. As had the National Conference of Bishops of Brazil, he denied the applicability of Canon 1398 of the 1983 Code of Canon Law to the girl's mother, because such an automatic excommunication does not apply to someone who acts out of grave fear.

== Other reactions ==
On 9 March 2009, Health Minister Temporão interrupted the opening ceremony of a national medical convention on women's health in Brasília in order to compliment Olímpio Moraes, one of the doctors who carried out the abortion and who was in attendance. Participants gave Moraes a standing ovation.

Moraes expressed gratitude to Sobrinho for the excommunication, which, he said, had drawn attention to Brazil's restrictive abortion laws. Another of the doctors involved said that he will continue attending Mass, "praying, conversing with God, and asking him to illuminate me and my colleagues in our medical team to help us take care of people in similar cases".

The United Nations Committee on the Rights of the Child, in its January 2014 assessment of the Holy See's compliance with the U.N. Convention on the Rights of the Child, cited this Brazil case. It "urge[d] the Holy See to review its position on abortion which places obvious risks on the life and health of pregnant girls and to amend Canon 1398 relating to abortion with a view to identifying circumstances under which access to abortion services can be permitted."

Human Life International gave Sobrinho its Cardinal von Galen award.

== In popular culture ==
The case served as the basis of the 2012 Brazilian film País do Desejo.
