= Denny Oliveira case =

2010 conviction for rape in Pernambuco, Brazil

- Location: Recife, Pernambuco, Brazil
- Date: January 1, 2007
- Attack type: Rape and indecent assault of minors
- Defenders: Caubi Arraes Junior, Cristiane de Gusmão Medeiros, Cristiane Caetano da Silva
- Accused: Denisson Oliveira Lima Cristiano dos Santos Costa
- Judge: Nivaldo Mulatto

The Denny Oliveira case refers to a series of accusations of crimes against sexual dignity brought by the Police Department for Children and Adolescents and by the Public Ministry of Pernambuco against the broadcaster Denny Oliveira and other members of the Much More auditorium program, on the TV Newspaper . The facts occurred from 2005 onwards, in Recife.

== History ==
=== Case ===
First, the Public Prosecutor's Office of Pernambuco filed lawsuits against the Jornal do Commercio de Comunicação System, the company that owns TV Jornal, where the television program Much More was broadcast. The broadcaster was sued for allowing children and adolescents to enter its premises unaccompanied by parents or legal guardians, from the age of fifteen, as long as they had been brought under the responsibility of a residents' association or educational institution, without the appropriate judicial authorization in the form of a permit or ordinance.

Later, he sued Denisson Oliveira Lima, known as Denny Oliveira, director and presenter of the program Much More, for the accusations of rape against a teenager, and violent indecent assault against three other young people, and offering alcoholic beverages to teenagers. In the Kelly Key contest, the Public Prosecutor's Office stated that a girl who participated in this event suffered sexual abuse in the Much More program . According to the complaint, the presenter was alone with her in a room, where she would have been groped on her legs. In the RBD Cover contest, male and female children would have suffered embarrassment. In the Banda Calypso contest, on November 14, 2008, GPCA delegate Cammilla Figueiredo denounced the Pernambuco Public Ministry against the conductor and stage assistant of the program Much More, Cristiano dos Santos Costa, accused of indecent assault and presumed rape to two 13-year-old girls during the contest.

=== Judgment ===
Judge Nivaldo Mulatinho denied Denny Oliveira's requests for preventive detention and referred the case to the Criminal Chamber of the TJPE. The judges of the Criminal Chamber of the Court of Justice of the State of Pernambuco unanimously denied the arrest of Denny Oliveira.

Denny Oliveira, was sentenced to 15 years in prison for the crimes of rape against two girls and violent assault against three others. The sentence, handed down on October 16, 2010, by Judge José Renato Bizerra, complied with a complaint by the Public Ministry of Pernambuco (MPPE). The magistrate responsible for the process did not immediately order the arrest of the presenter, because he responded to the entire deed in freedom and has the right to appeal the decision also in freedom. The process runs in secrecy of justice.

According to the MPPE, the prosecutors Cristiane de Gusmão Medeiros and Cristiane Caetano da Silva who work on the Crimes Against Children and Adolescents Court, alleged the fragility of the defense that tried to disqualify the victims and victimize the defendant, showing him how to had been involved in some sort of scam.

"As if it were credible to accept that a citizen of the age group, social condition and evidence in the media, could have any justification for getting involved (or being involved?) by children and adolescents of a lower social level than his, under the allegation that victims intended to apply some blow to him", explained the prosecutors in the text of the document of the final arguments.

The prosecutors also drew attention to the testimonies of the victims and witnesses, which were uniform and inconsistent, even if the victims were not known or friends, frequented the homes or any other location, except for participating in auditorium programs led by the presenter, gave testimonials in unison. "The subversion of the roles of victim and defendant translates into a perverse game that, in an effort to disqualify the victims, ends up highlighting the criminal and repulsive profile of the defendant who does not spare children and adolescents to satisfy his lust", showed the promoters.

Another point that the prosecutors used to undo the defense's thesis, was that the presenter commanded contests between teenagers, and that therefore, he had the obligation to know the age range of the contestants. Thus, the argument that Denny Oliveira would have been confused by the female appearance of one of the teenagers is totally discredited. Furthermore, all defense witnesses limited themselves to attesting to the alleged good character of the defendant, without giving any concrete evidence of his innocence.
