= O Canto da Sereia =

Brazilian TV miniseries

- Genre: Suspense; Romance; Drama
- Created by: George Moura; Patrícia Andrade; Sérgio Goldenberg
- Directed by: José Luiz Villamarim; Ricardo Waddington
- Starring: Ísis Valverde; Marcos Palmeira; Camila Morgado; João Miguel; Fabíula Nascimento; Marcos Caruso; Marcelo Médici; Gabriel Braga Nunes; Margareth Menezes; Zezé Motta; Marcélia Cartaxo; Fábio Lago
- Country of origin: Brazil
- Original language: Portuguese
- No. of episodes: 4

Production
- Production location: Bahia
- Running time: 40 minutes

Original release
- Network: Rede Globo
- Release: January 8 – January 11, 2013

Related
- O Brado Retumbante; Amores Roubados

O Canto da Sereia (English: Siren's Song) is a Brazilian miniseries produced and broadcast by Rede Globo in 2013. It stars Ísis Valverde, Marcos Palmeira, João Miguel, Fabíula Nascimento, Marcos Caruso, Marcelo Médici, Fábio Lago, Gabriel Braga Nunes and Camila Morgado.

== Cast ==
Actor/Actress	Character
Ísis Valverde	Sereia Maria de Oliveira
Marcos Palmeira	Agostinho Matoso (Augustão)
Camila Morgado	Mara Moreira
João Miguel	Beroaldo (Só Love)
Fabiula Nascimento	Mãe Marina de Oxum
Gabriel Braga Nunes	Paulinho de Jesus
Marcos Caruso	Juracy Bandeira (Dr. Jotabê)
Marcelo Médici	Artur Tavares da Silva (Tuta)
Fábio Lago	Vavá de Zefa
Guilherme Silva	Jorge Luiz Santana (Jorge de Ogum)
Margareth Menezes	Marta Pimenta
Zezé Motta	Tia Celeste
Marcélia Cartaxo	Salete
Frank Menezes	Juarez
AC Costa	Geraldo da Silva
Antonio Fábio	Rúbens Marques
Val Perré	Maicon Santos (Dedé)

== International Broadcasts ==
Country	Channel	Title	Premiere	End	Weekly Schedule	Hour
(Brazil)	Rede Globo	O Canto da Sereia	January 8, 2013	January 11, 2013	Tuesday to Friday	23:00
(Portugal)	Globo Portugal	O Canto da Sereia	April 22, 2013	April 25, 2013	Monday to Thursday	22:30
(Australia)	SBS	Siren's Song	July 1, 2014	July 2, 2014	Tuesday and Wednesday	23:00
(Uruguay)	Teledoce	El Canto de la Sirena	January 13, 2015	January 22, 2015	Tuesday to Thursday	22:30
(Panama)	Telemetro	El Canto de la Sirena				
(Nigeria)	Montage TV	Siren's Song				
