= Gabriel Braga Nunes =

Brazilian actor (born 1972)

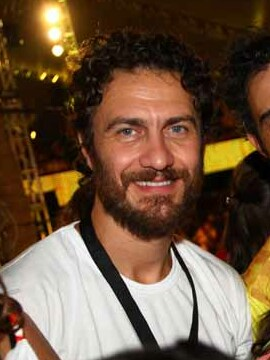
- Nunes in 2012
- Born: February 7, 1972 (age 54); São Paulo, Brazil
- Education: University of Campinas
- Occupation: Actor
- Years active: 1990–present
- Spouse: Isabel Nascimento Silva (m. 2014)
- Parent(s): Regina Braga (mother); Celso Nunes (father); Drauzio Varella (stepfather)
- Relatives: Nina Braga Nunes (younger sister)

Gabriel Braga Nunes (born February 7, 1972) is a Brazilian actor, best known for his work in telenovelas, specially Essas Mulheres, Cidadão Brasileiro, Caminhos do Coração and Poder Paralelo. He also stars in Insensato Coração for TV Globo.

== Career ==
Graduate in Theatre Arts from University of Campinas, made his television debut in 1996, playing Mário on the telenovela Razão de Viver, aired on SBT. In 1997, he played a photographer in the miniseries Por Amor e Ódio, at Rede Record. After that, he worked in several of the Rede Globo soap operas such as O Beijo do Vampiro, Terra Nostra and Anjo Mau.

In 2006, he returned to Rede Record. After the successful telenovela Essas Mulheres, in which he played Fernando Seixas, Braga Nunes starred Cidadão Brasileiro as Antonio Maciel. In 2009, Gabriel Braga Nunes protagonist of the telenovela Poder Paralelo with the character Antonio Castellamare, with actress Paloma Duarte. After participating in five soap operas in five years, Braga Nunes decided to take a "vacation" of television.

In late 2010, however, the actor has been invited to join the miniseries As Cariocas, the chapter "A Atormentada da Tijuca", played by Paola Oliveira. This was his first return to work globo

Gabriel played the villain Léo in the telenovela Insensato Coração. After the close of this novel, he closed his 4-year contract with Globo.

In 2011, he worked in the stage play Caminhos da Independência, playing Dom Pedro I. In 2013, he was cast to play the mysterious Teacher Aristóbulo in Saramandaia.

In 2014, Braga Nunes lives Laerte, the central character in the third stage of the telenovela Em Família. In the same year, it is reserved for the new telenovela of Gilberto Braga, Babilônia.

== Personal life ==
Gabriel is the son of actress Regina Braga and director Celso Nunes. His younger sister is theater producer Nina Braga Nunes (she is two years younger than Gabriel).

Gabriel Braga Nunes had a relationship with actress and singer Danni Carlos for about three years. In mid-2005, the couple began living together, being separated in 2007. In 2009, during the filming of the soap opera Poder Paralelo, Braga Nunes became involved with co-star Paloma Duarte.

In April 2014, he married the assistant director, Isabel Nascimento Silva. In June of the same year, his first daughter, Maria, was born.

== Filmography ==
=== Television ===
Year	Title	Role	Notes
1996	Razão de Viver	Mário Santos Silva	
1997	Por Amor e Ódio	Lucas Diegues / Luciano	
1997	Anjo Mau	Olavinho Jordão Ferraz	
1999	Terra Nostra	Augusto Neves Marcondes	
2000	Uga-Uga	Otacílio	Special participation
2001	Estrela-Guia	Guilherme Nunes	
2002	O Quinto dos Infernos	Felício Pinto Coelho de Mendonça	
2002	O Beijo do Vampiro	Victor Victório	
2003	Zorra Total	Himself	Special participation
2003	Kubanacan	Victor	Episodes: "September 13–17, 2003"
2004	Senhora do Destino	Dirceu de Castro (young)	Episodes: "June 28–30, 2004"
2004	Os Aspones	Paulo Rodrigues Nunes Filho	Episode: "O Mau Dia no Escritório"
2004	Sob Nova Direção		Episode: "Confusões de Adolescente"
2005	Linha Direta Justiça	Giuseppe Pistone	Episode: "O Crime da Mala"
2005	Carandiru, Outras Histórias	Cobra Sérgio	Episode: "Ezequiel, o Azarado"
2005	Essas Mulheres	Fernando Rodrigues de Seixas	
2006	Cidadão Brasileiro	Antônio Maciel	
2007	Caminhos do Coração	Sigismundo Taveira	
2008	Os Mutantes - Caminhos do Coração	Sigismundo Taveira	
2009	Poder Paralelo	Antonio Castellamare (Tony)	
2010	As Cariocas	Gilberto Tavares de Assis	Episode: "A Atormentada da Tijuca"
2011	Insensato Coração	Leonardo Brandão (Léo)	
2012	Amor Eterno Amor	Carlos / Barão (Rodrigo Borges)	
2013	O Canto da Sereia	Paulinho de Jesus	
2013	Saramandaia	Teacher Aristóbulo Camargo	
2014	Em Família	Laerte Fernandes	
2015	Babilonia	Luís Fernando Vidal	
2016	Alemão - Os Dois Lados do Complexo	Danilo	
2016	Liberdade, Liberdade	Duque de Ega	Episodes: "July 11–26, 2016"
2017	Novo Mundo	Thomas Johnson	
2017	Cidade Proibida	Augusto Mendes	Episode: "Caso Lupi"
2021	Verdades Secretas	Percival "Percy" Biancchini	Season 2

=== Film ===
Year	Title	Role
2000	Mater Dei	Vinícius
2003	Carandiru, Outras Histórias	Sérgio (Cobra)
2004	A Dona da História	Himself
2011	O Homem do Futuro	Ricardo
2011	País do Desejo	César
2013	Anita e Garibaldi	Giuseppe Garibaldi
2014	Alemão	Danilo
2015	A Floresta que se Move	Elias
2015	Chatô, o Rei do Brasil	Carlos Rosemberg
2023	Angela	Raul
