= TV Alterosa =

Television station in Belo Horizonte, Brazil

TV Alterosa Belo Horizonte (ZYP 266)
- Belo Horizonte, Minas Gerais; Brazil
- Channels: Digital: 35 (UHF); Virtual: 5

Programming
- Affiliations: SBT

Ownership
- Owner: Diários Associados; (Sociedade Rádio e Televisão Alterosa Ltda.)
- Sister stations: Clube FM Belo Horizonte

History
- Founded: March 13, 1962
- Former call signs: ZYA 723 (1962-2017)
- Former channel numbers: Analog:2 (VHF, 1962-1977), 5 (VHF, 1977-2017)
- Former affiliations: REI (1969-1981)

Technical information
- Licensing authority: ANATEL
- ERP: 4.5 kW
- Transmitter coordinates: 19°58′13.9″S 43°55′42.7″W

Links
- Public license information: Profile
- Website: www.alterosa.com.br

TV Alterosa is a television station in Belo Horizonte, capital of the Brazilian state of Minas Gerais. It transmits programming of the national Sistema Brasileiro de Televisão in Minas Gerais, as well as local programs on channels 5 VHF analog and 36 UHF digital.

== History ==
TV Alterosa was founded on 13 March 1962 by Assis Chateaubriand.
