= Guilherme Fontes =

Brazilian actor and director (born 1967)

- Born: Guilherme Machado Cardoso Fontes; January 8, 1967 (age 59); Petrópolis, Rio de Janeiro, Brazil
- Occupation: Actor
- Years active: 1985–present

Guilherme Machado Cardoso Fontes (born January 8, 1967) is a Brazilian actor and director.

== Filmography ==
=== As a movie actor ===
- 1986 - A Cor do Seu Destino .... Paulo
- 1987 - Um Trem para as Estrelas ... Vinicius
- 1988 - Dedé Mamata .... Dedé
- 2007 - Primo Basílio .... Sebastião
- 2015 - Chatô, o Rei do Brasil - TV Presenter
- 2021- O Silêncio da Chuva - Ricardo Carvalho
- 2021 - Lulli - Dr. César Andrade
- As a cinema director
- 2015 - Chatô, o Rei do Brasil

=== As a television actor ===
- series
- 1988 - O Pagador de Promessas .... Aderbal
- 1990 - Desejo .... Dilermando
- 2008 - Casos e Acasos .... Chico
- 2009 - Tudo Novo de Novo .... Paulo
- 2010 - S.O.S. Emergência .... Heitor
- 2010 - As Cariocas .... Luiz Felipe
- 2012 - As Brasileiras .... Nelson
- 2018 - Pacto de Sangue .... Silas Campello
- 2023 - Os Outros .... Jorge
- 2023 - Histórias (Im)Possíveis .... Pedro
- novels
- 1985 - Ti Ti Ti .... Caco
- 1986 - Selva de Pedra .... Júnior
- 1988 - Bebê a Bordo .... Rei
- 1990 - Gente Fina .... Maurício
- 1993 - Mulheres de Areia .... Marcos Assunção
- 1994 - A Viagem .... Alexandre Toledo
- 1995 - Malhação .... Rei Star
- 1996 - O Fim do Mundo .... Josias Junqueira
- 1996 - O Rei do Gado .... Otávio (Tavinho)
- 2001 - Estrela-Guia .... Tony Salles
- 2005 - Bang Bang .... Jeff Wall Street
- 2007 - Malhação .... Fernando Albuquerque (Naninho)
- 2008 - Beleza Pura .... Alexandre Brito (Alex)
- 2011 - Cordel Encantado .... Marquês Zenóbio Alfredo
- 2013 - Além do Horizonte .... Flávio Andrade
- 2019 - Órfãos da Terra .... Norberto Monte Castelli
- 2024 - Renascer .... Humberto Carvalho
