= Ísis Valverde =

Brazilian actress (born 1987)

Isis Valverde
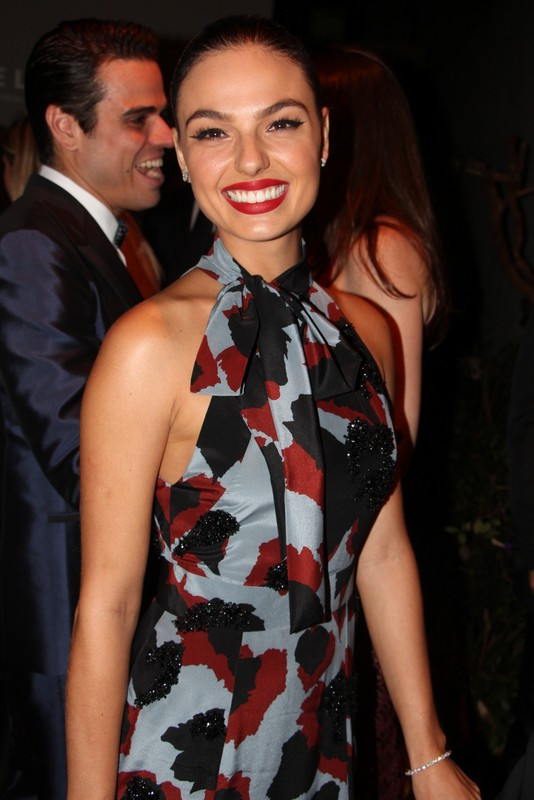
- Valverde in 2015
- Born: Isis Nable Valverde; 17 February 1987 (age 39); Aiuruoca, Minas Gerais, Brazil
- Occupation: Actress
- Years active: 2006–present
- Spouse(s): André Resende (m. 2018; div. 2022) Marcus Buaiz (m. 2024)
- Children: 1
- Website: www.isisvalverdeoficial.com.br

Isis Nable Valverde (born 17 February 1987) is a Brazilian actress who played a lead role in the 2010 telenovela Ti Ti Ti and has participated in several other telenovelas.

== Biography ==
Valverde was born in Aiuruoca, Minas Gerais. She moved to Belo Horizonte to study when she was 15 years old. She starred in several advertisements when she was 16 years old, and moved to Rio de Janeiro at the age of 18 to study theater. She has Italian grandparents.

== Career ==
She played a mysterious character named Ana do Véu (Ana of the Veil) in the 2006 Rede Globo telenovela Sinhá Moça. Valverde played her first villain in the 2007 telenovela Paraíso Tropical, a prostitute named Telma. The actress played a sexy manicurist named Rakelli in the 2008 telenovela Beleza Pura.

Valverde played Camila in the 2009 telenovela Caminho das Índias, her character falls in love with Ravi, an Indian character played by Caio Blat. She played a lead role for the first time in the 2010 telenovela Ti Ti Ti, as Marcela, a character who gets involved in a romantic triangle with Edgar (played by Caio Castro) and Renato (played by Guilherme Winter). The actress played the lead female role Maria Lúcia in the 2011 film Brazilian Western, released on May 30, 2013. She played an unlucky character named Catarina in the A Culpada de BH episode of the 2012 television series As Brasileiras. She played Suellen in the 2012 Rede Globo telenovela Avenida Brasil. Valverde played the lead character, Sereia, in the 2013 Rede Globo miniseries O Canto da Sereia. She plays Antônia in the 2014 miniseries Amores Roubados, a young woman who starts a relationship with a thief.

== Filmography ==
=== Television ===
Year	Telenovela	Role	Notes
2006	Sinhá Moça	Ana Luísa Maria Teixeira "Ana do Véu"	
2007	Paraíso Tropical	Telma Linhares	
2008	Beleza Pura	Rakelli dos Santos Ferreira	
2009	Caminho das Índias	Camila Félix Gallo Goulart Ananda	
2010	Ti Ti Ti	Marcela de Andrade	
2012	As Brasileiras	Catarina	Episode: A Culpada de BH
2012	Avenida Brasil	Suelen	
2013	O Canto da Sereia	Sereia	
2014	Amores Roubados	Antônia	
2014	Boogie Oogie	Sandra	
2017	A Força do Querer	Ritinha	
2019	Amor de Mãe	Betina	
2025	Maria e o Cangaço	Maria Bonita	

=== Cinema ===
Year	Film	Role
2007	Ré Bemol	
2013	Brazilian Western	Maria Lúcia
2013	Turbo	Burn/Brasa (Brazilian dub)
2017	Amor.com	Katrina Soutto
2017	Malasartes e o Duelo com a Morte	Áurea
2018	Simonal	Tereza Pugliesi
2023	Angela	Ângela Diniz
2025	Alarum	Bridgette Rousseau
2026	Quarto do Pânico	Mari

=== Awards and nominations ===
Awards
Year	Result	Award	Category	Work
2008	Won	Capricho Awards	Best National Actress	Beleza Pura
2008	Won	Melhores do Ano	Best Supporting Actress	Beleza Pura
2009	Nominated	Capricho Awards	Best National Actress	Caminho das Índias
2013	Won	Melhores do Ano	Best Supporting Actress	Avenida Brasil
2025	Nominated	Golden Raspberry Awards	Worst Supporting Actress	Alarum

== Agency ==
Musa Talent Management - (Milan,italy)
