= Camila Morgado =

Brazilian actress (born 1975)

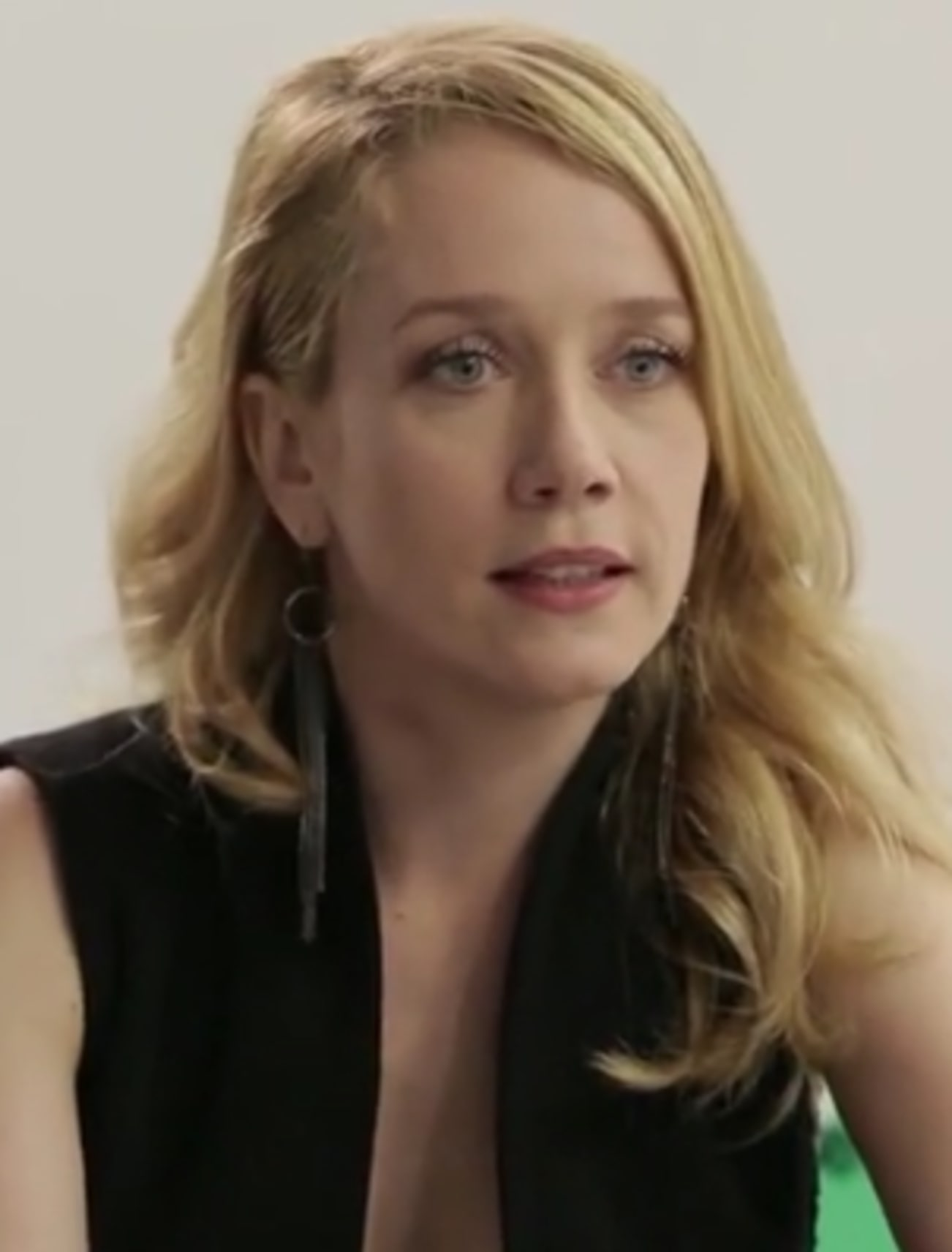
- Morgado in 2014
- Born: Camila Ribeiro da Silva; 12 April 1975 (age 51); Petrópolis, Rio de Janeiro, Brazil
- Education: Federal University of the State of Rio de Janeiro (dropped out)
- Occupation: Actress
- Years active: 2000–present

Camila Ribeiro da Silva (born 12 April 1975), known professionally as Camila Morgado, is a Brazilian actress.

== Career ==
The daughter of a merchant and a stay-at-home mother, she decided she wanted to be an actress at an early age. She moved to São Paulo to study theater with Antunes Filho. In 2003, she landed a role in A Casa das Sete Mulheres, playing Manuela de Paula Ferreira and revealing itself to a vast television audience.

In 2004, Morgado played the title character in the film Olga, with a screenplay based on the book by Fernando Morais. That same year, she appeared in the miniseries Um Só Coração as Cacilda Becker. She played Ana Rosemberg, a lesbian journalist, in the miniseries JK. and auditioned for the role of "May" in the soap opera América (2005).

Morgado presented the programme Faixa Comentada on Futura. In 2008, she appeared in the musical comedy Doce Deleite, directed by Marília Pêra. The following year, she appeared in Viver a Vida, by Manoel Carlos.

In 2011, Morgado appeared in the stage play Igual a Você, along with Bia Nunnes and Anderson Müller. In 2012, she was part of the ensemble series As Brasileiras. She currently is part of the cast of Avenida Brasil, playing the role of Noêmia. In 2013, she had a cameo role in A Grande Família as "Cris".

In 2014, Morgado plays Sara Xerxes, a woman in a dreary routine who finds a new meaning for her life: to take revenge on all her ex-boyfriends, in the series Multishow, Por Isso Eu Sou Vingativa. In the same year, she plays the single rich party girl, Maria Angélica, in the remake of O Rebu.

== Filmography ==
=== Television ===
Year	Title	Role	Notes
2003	A Casa das Sete Mulheres	Manuela de Paula Ferreira	
2004	Um Só Coração	Cacilda Becker	
2005	América	May	
2006	JK	Ana Rosenberg	
2007	Faixa Comentada	Presenter	
2008	Dicas de Um Sedutor	Cristina	Episode: "Maktub"
2008	Casos e Acasos	Juliana	Episode: "O Diagnóstico, o Fetiche e a Bebida"
2008	Faça Sua História	Manic Scissors	Episode: "A Matadora"
2009	Viver a Vida	Malu Trindade	
2011	Amor em 4 Atos	Selma	Episodes: "Folhetim" / "Vitrines"
2011	Saia Justa	Presenter	Season 10
2012	As Brasileiras	Mãe Vitória	Episode: "A Apaixonada de Niterói"
2012	Avenida Brasil	Noêmia Buarque Queirós	
2013	O Canto da Sereia	Mara Moreira	
2013	A Grande Família	Cris	Episode: "Cenas de um Descasamento"
2014	Por Isso Eu Sou Vingativa	Sara Xerxes	
2014	O Rebu	Maria Angélica	
2014	Gentalha	Lúcia	Episode: "O Vampiro"
2015	Babilônia	Celeste	Special participation
2016	A Lei do Amor	Vitória Costa Leitão	
2018	Malhação: Vidas Brasileiras	Gabriela Fortes (Gabi)	Main role
2020	Good Morning, Verônica	Janete Cruz	
2022	Pantanal	Irma Braga Novaes	
2024	Renascer	Iolanda Martinez Coutinho "Dona Patroa"	

=== Film ===
Year	Title	Role
2004	Olga	Olga Benário
2005	Vinicius	Poem reader
2013	Até que a Sorte nos Separe 2	Jane
2015	Happily Married	Penélope
2015	Até Que A Sorte Nos Separe 3: A Falência Final	Jane
2017	Vergel	Woman
2017	O Animal Cordial	Verônica
2017	Divórcio	Noeli
2018	Albatroz	Renée

== Theater ==
Year	Title	Role
2000	Ventriloquist	
2000	Nietzsche Contra Wagner	
2000	Esperando Beckett	
2001	O Príncipe de Copacabana	
2006	Paixão de Cristo	Mary
2008	Doce Deleite	Various
2011	Igual a Você	Various
2011	Palácio do Fim	Lynndie England
