= País do Desejo =

2012 film by Paulo Caldas

- Theatrical release poster
- Directed by: Paulo Caldas
- Written by: Paulo Caldas; Pedro Severien; Amin Stepple
- Starring: Fábio Assunção; Maria Padilha; Gabriel Braga Nunes; Fernanda Vianna; Germano Haiut; Nicolau Breyner
- Cinematography: Paulo Jacinto dos Reis
- Edited by: Vânia Debs
- Production companies: Fado Filmes; 99 Produções; Cena Dois; Bananeira Filmes
- Distributed by: Califórnia Filmes (Brazil); Zon Lusomundo Audiovisuais (Portugal)
- Release dates: 26 January 2012 (Portugal); 25 January 2013 (Brazil)
- Running time: 87 minutes
- Countries: Brazil; Portugal
- Language: Portuguese

País do Desejo is a 2012 drama film co-written and directed by Paulo Caldas. The film premiered at the 35th São Paulo International Film Festival.

The film is based on a 2009 real-life case in which a 9-year-old Brazilian girl became pregnant after years of sexual abuse committed by her stepfather. As the pregnancy was the result of a rape and represented a risk to the girl's life, she underwent an abortion, as is provided for under Brazilian law.

The story is told from the center of the crisis of a Catholic priest that is positioned against the decision of the Archbishop of the Church to excommunicate the mother, the girl, and the doctors involved in the abortion.

== Plot ==
The film tells the story of Roberta, a famous classical pianist who faces a tough battle against severe kidney disease, and José, a somewhat unconventional priest, which supports a 12-year-old girl raped by her uncle and pregnant with twins, to have an abortion.

The fate of the two characters crosses when Roberta faints at a concert and is hospitalized in a local clinic, belonging to the brother of the priest. Gradually, he is interested by the pianist, and that love will change their destiny in many ways.

== Cast ==
- Maria Padilha as Roberta
- Fábio Assunção as Father José
- Gabriel Braga Nunes as César
- Germano Haiut as Dr. Orlando
