= Estado de Minas =

Brazilian newspaper

- O Grande Jornal dos Mineiros (The Great Newspaper of the Mineiros)

- Front page reporting on the Mineiraço: "Do you even want to remember what happened? Then turn the page."
- Type: Daily newspaper
- Format: Broadsheet
- Owner: Diários Associados
- Editor: Carlos Marcelo Carvalho
- Founded: March 7, 1928
- Political alignment: Centrism, Non-partisan
- Headquarters: Av. Getúlio Vargas, 291, Funcionários; Belo Horizonte, Brazil
- Circulation: 83.787
- ISSN: 1809-9874
- Website: www.em.com.br

Estado de Minas (abbreviated EM) is a Brazilian newspaper published in the capital of Minas Gerais state, Belo Horizonte. It was founded in March 1928, and one year later it was bought by Assis Chateaubriand's Diários Associados. EM is the most traditional and respected publication of Minas, and the highest-selling broadsheet of the state, with a daily average of 83,787 copies throughout 2012. It is only surpassed in Minas by tabloid Super Notícia, and ranks 14th among all publications of Brazil. It is also considered one of the most important and respected Brazilian newspapers.
