= Regina Braga =

Brazilian actress

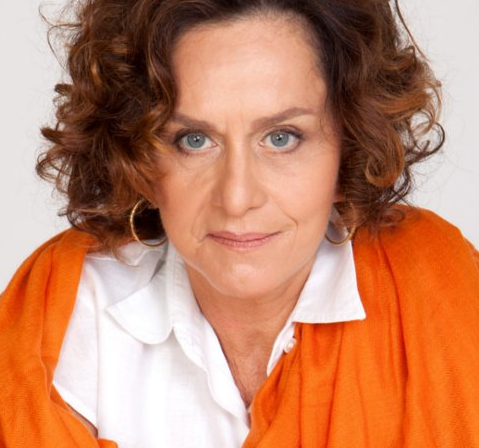
- Braga in 2016
- Born: Regina Lúcia Palhano Braga; September 28, 1945 (age 80); Belo Horizonte, Minas Gerais, Brazil
- Occupation: Actress
- Years active: 1967–present
- Spouses: Celso Nunes (m. 1968; div. 1978) Drauzio Varella (m. 1981)
- Children: Gabriel Braga Nunes

Regina Lúcia Palhano Braga Varella (born September 28, 1945) is a Brazilian actress. She is best known for television series such as Um Lugar ao Sol (2021). She also starred in the play São Paulo.

== Personal life ==
She was married to Drauzio Varella. She is the mother of actor Gabriel Braga Nunes.
