= Alarum (film) =

2025 film by Michael Polish

- Theatrical release poster
- Directed by: Michael Polish
- Written by: Alexander Vesha
- Produced by: Joel Cohen; Thiago Andreo Barbosa Nogueira; Randall Emmett
- Starring: Scott Eastwood; Sylvester Stallone; Willa Fitzgerald; Mike Colter; Ísis Valverde; Joel Cohen
- Cinematography: Jayson Crothers
- Edited by: Paul Buhl
- Music by: Yagmur Kaplan
- Production company: Convergence Entertainment Group
- Distributed by: Lionsgate
- Release date: January 17, 2025
- Running time: 95 minutes
- Country: United States
- Language: English
- Box office: $254,370

Alarum is a 2025 American action crime thriller film directed by Michael Polish and starring Scott Eastwood, Sylvester Stallone, Willa Fitzgerald, Mike Colter, Ísis Valverde, and Joel Cohen.

In this film, Joe and Lara, who were once rivals, fall in love during a mission and decide to go rogue to get married. They manage to escape their respective agencies and establish a quiet life, but their peace is shattered when a plane crash near their cabin reveals a hard drive that several organizations want.

Alarum was released in the United States in select theaters and on video on demand on January 17, 2025 to negative reviews from critics.

== Plot ==
In 2019, CIA spy Archibald falls in love with rival spy Lara during a mission in Prague and decides to leave the organization and marry her. They successfully escape their respective organizations and she joins the mysterious organization "Alarum", which aims to overthrow the tyranny of the global intelligence network; Archibald adopts the name Joe.

Five years later, during their honeymoon at a remote Gdańsk resort, Lara secretly monitors Roland Rousseau, a banker who had laundered money for arms dealers. She reveals her Alarum directive to protect him to Joe after they settled in. One morning, a light aircraft belonging to the Alarum crashes near the resort. Joe recovers a USB drive he cuts out of one the assassinated pilots that appears to be damaging for the DEA.

Soon after, Orlin, an agent of the Yellowjacket organization, and several of his henchmen attack for the drive. Orlin kills Roland's wife, Bridgette, who happened to be with Joe in the woods exploring with a group from the resort when the plane went down.

CIA Director Burbridge sends an Arbiter named Chester to steal the USB drive and execute Joe. Orlin leads a large group of Russian mercenaries to hunt down Joe and Lara; Joe temporarily teams up with Chester to fight the mercenaries, while Lara tells Roland to hide and then she faces the mercenaries who have taken over the resort alone.

To be on the safe side, Chester sneakily injects Joe with what appears to be the same poison he used to kill someone earlier, giving him only an hour to live. While Orlin and his men are bombarding them, Chester discovers that Joe always had the USB drive, so he took it and left, leaving Joe alone to face Orlin. Orlin accepted Joe's suggestion to team up and temporarily cease hostilities.

Burbridge decides to send two drones to wipe out Joe, Lara, and Orlin. After Joe and Orlin shoot down one of the drones, Orlin is poised to kill Joe, but Lara appears in time and shoots him dead.

At dawn, Joe and the injured Lara are by the lake, where he decides to join her at Alarum. Then Chester arrives, and soon discovers that earlier he had been tricked by Joe to drink the poison he thought he had used on Joe. So, he proposes an alliance to help them wipe out Burbridge and their enemies. Joe agrees and gives him the antidote, after which an Alarum helicopter arrives to pick them up.

== Cast ==
- Scott Eastwood as Agent Joe Travers / Archibald
- Sylvester Stallone as Agent Chester
- Willa Fitzgerald as Agent Lara Travers
- Mike Colter as Orlin
- Ísis Valverde as Bridgette Rousseau
- Joel Cohen as Roland Rousseau
- D. W. Moffett as Director Burbridge
- Mark Polish as CIA Agent Kirby
- Abigail Spear as Poppy
- Anton Narinsky as Krol
- La Monde Byrd as Splinter

== Production ==
The film was awarded $5,863,392 from the Ohio Motion Picture Tax Credit Program on February 13, 2024.

Principal photography began on February 26 in Oxford, Ohio at Hueston Woods State Park, and wrapped on May 14.

In May 2024, it was announced that Signature Entertainment acquired U.K. and Irish distribution rights to the film.

== Release ==
=== Theatrical ===
Alarum was released in the United States in select theaters and on video on demand on January 17, 2025.

== Reception ==
=== Box office ===
As of September 24, 2025, Alarum grossed $254,370 in the United Arab Emirates, Portugal, Colombia, and Russia.

=== Critical response ===
On the review aggregator website Rotten Tomatoes, 0% of 22 critics' reviews are positive, with an average rating of 3.4/10. The website's consensus reads: "Alarum is nothing less than a lackluster spy thriller with uninspired performances, pedestrian action, and a convoluted but banal plot." Metacritic, which uses a weighted average, assigned the film a score of 23 out of 100, based on 5 critics, indicating "generally unfavorable" reviews.

Peter Sobczynski of RogerEbert.com awarded the film one star out of four. On The Guardian, Leslie Felperin awarded the film one star out of five, writing that "a film so bad it shames American cinema itself. And it wasn’t even made in Hollywood!"

=== Accolades ===
Accolades received by Bride Hard
Award	Date of ceremony	Category	Recipient(s)	Result	Ref.
Golden Raspberry Awards	March 14, 2026	Worst Actor	Scott Eastwood	Nominated	
Golden Raspberry Awards	March 14, 2026	Worst Supporting Actor	Sylvester Stallone	Nominated	
Golden Raspberry Awards	March 14, 2026	Worst Supporting Actress	Isis Valverde	Nominated	
