= Os Bruzundangas =

Book by Lima Barreto

The Bruzundangas
- Author: Lima Barreto
- Original title: Os Bruzundangas
- Language: Portuguese
- Publication date: 1922
- Publication place: Brazil
- ISBN: 978-6-586-58857-6

Os Bruzundangas (English: The Bruzundangas) is a short story book written by Brazilian writer Lima Barreto. It was first published in 1922.

The book satirizes the politics of Brazil by telling about the "trip" the author made to the fictional country of "Bruzundanga" (which represents Brazil), a country overrun by corruption, poverty and ignorance.
