= Concluding observations on the second periodic report of the Holy See =

2014 United Nations report

Concluding observations on the second periodic report of the Holy See was a 2014 report issued by the Office of the United Nations High Commissioner for Human Rights, regarding the handling by the Catholic Church and Holy See of cases of sexual abuse against minors.
