= Jornal do Commercio =

Portuguese language newspaper

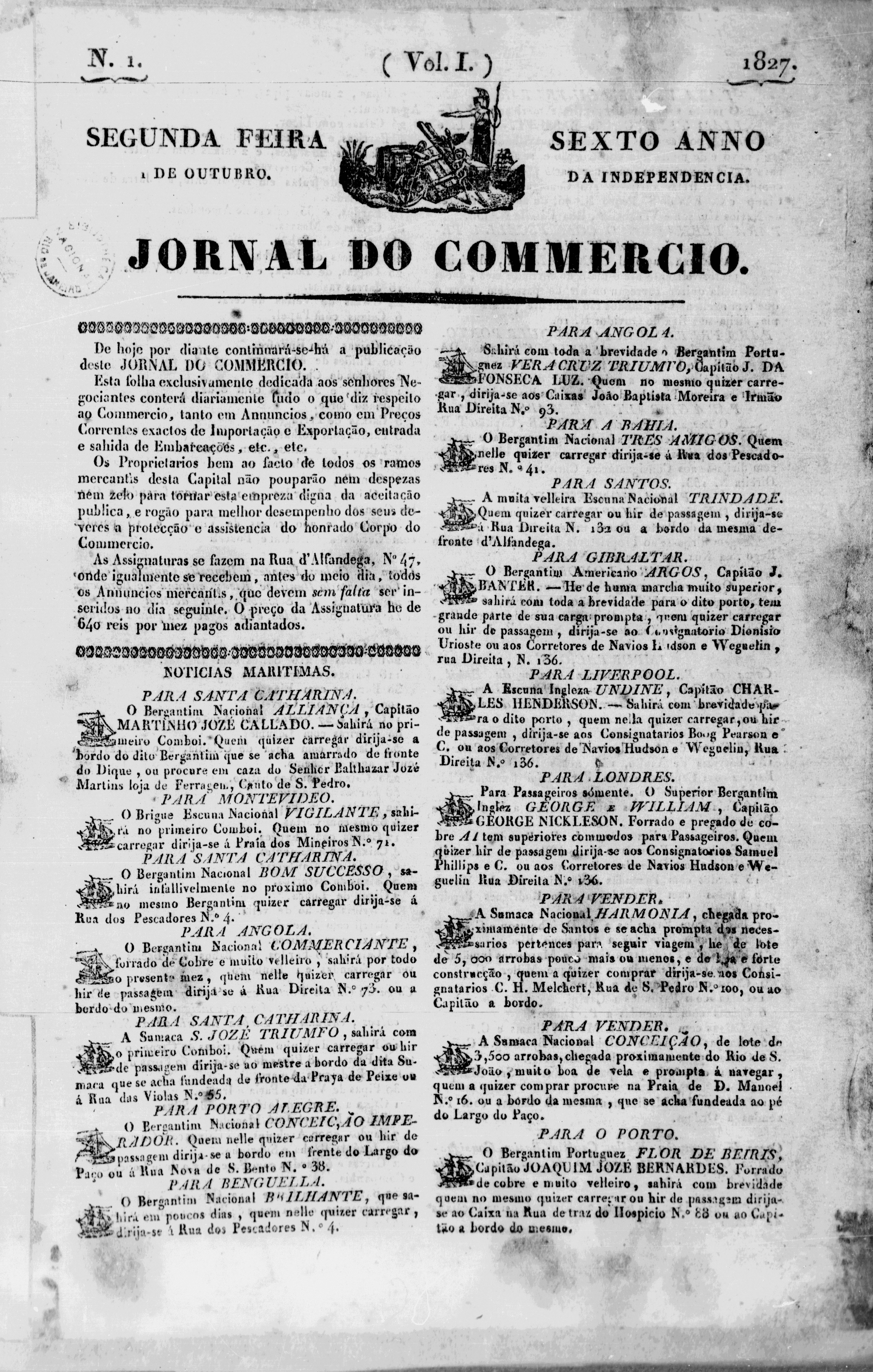
- First page of the first edition published on 1 October 1827
- Founder: Pierre Plancher
- Founded: 31 August 1827
- Ceased publication: 29 April 2016
- Language: Portuguese
- Headquarters: Rio de Janeiro, Brazil

Jornal do Commercio was a newspaper published in Rio de Janeiro. It was founded in 1827 by French journalist Pierre Plancher. It was the oldest newspaper in circulation in South America, until the last publication on 29 April 2016, when it ceased operations.

== History ==
It originated from the Diário Mercantil, created in 1824 by Francisco Manuel Ferreira & Cia. and focused on economic news. Acquired by Pierre Plancher for 1:000$000 (one conto de réis), its name was changed to Jornal do Commercio on October 1, 1827.

During the monarchy, Dom Pedro II had a column in the newspaper, and, between 1890 and 1915, under the leadership of José Carlos Rodrigues, the newspaper featured contributions from figures such as Rui Barbosa, Viscount of Taunay, Alcindo Guanabara, Araripe Júnior, Afonso Celso, and Lima Barreto, among others. At the time, the leading editorialist was journalist José Maria da Silva Paranhos Júnior, the Baron of Rio Branco.

In 1959, it was acquired by Assis Chateaubriand and became part of the Diários Associados. In 2005, it expanded by opening branches in São Paulo, Brasília, and Belo Horizonte, where it began being sold at newsstands, directly competing with other major Brazilian economic newspapers such as Valor Econômico and Gazeta Mercantil. With the digital era, it also created a news portal on the internet.

On April 29, 2016, its final edition was published, ending its operations both as a print newspaper and as an online portal. The closure was attributed to the Brazilian economic crisis of 2014.
