= Lima Barreto =

Brazilian writer (1881–1922)

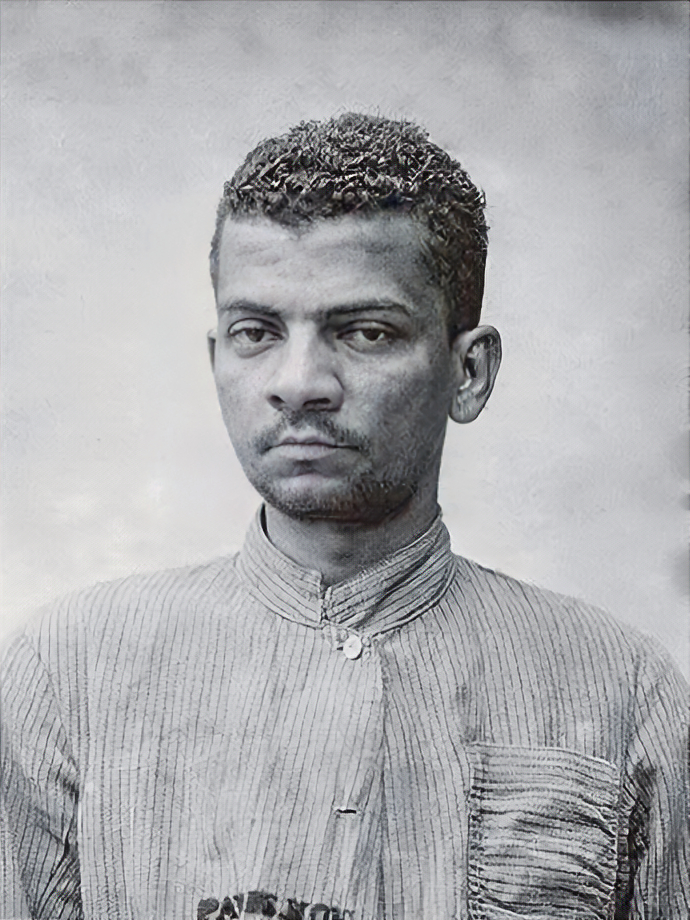
- Born: Afonso Henriques de Lima Barreto; 13 May 1881; Rio de Janeiro, Empire of Brazil
- Died: 1 November 1922 (aged 41); Rio de Janeiro, Brazil
- Education: Colégio Pedro II
- Alma mater: Escola Politécnica da UFRJ
- Occupations: Novelist, short story writer, journalist
- Relatives: Afonso Celso de Assis Figueiredo (godfather)
- Writing career
- Period: 1900–1922
- Genre: Satire
- Notable works: Triste Fim de Policarpo Quaresma, Os Bruzundangas, Clara dos Anjos, O Cemitério dos Vivos
- Literary movement: Pre-Modernism

Afonso Henriques de Lima Barreto (13 May 1881 – 1 November 1922) was a Brazilian novelist and journalist. A major figure in Brazilian Pre-Modernism, he is famous for the novel Triste Fim de Policarpo Quaresma, a bitter satire of the early years of the First Brazilian Republic.

== Life ==
Lima Barreto was born on 13 May 1881 in the bairro of Laranjeiras in Rio de Janeiro. He was born on a Friday the 13th, considered superstitiously to be an unlucky day, but which he personally considered to bring good luck. His date of birth would also be marked seven years later by the signing of the Golden Law, which abolished slavery in Brazil. His father, João Henriques de Lima Barreto, was a typographer and a monarchist who had close connections to Afonso Celso de Assis Figueiredo, the Viscount of Ouro Preto, who would later become Lima Barreto's godfather. Barreto's mother, Amália Augusta, died when he was very young, and he was subsequently sent to study at a private school run by Teresa Pimentel do Amaral. Soon after, he entered at the Liceu Popular Niteroiense, after the Viscount of Ouro Preto decided to pay for his studies. He graduated in 1894, and in the following year, he would enter the famous Colégio Pedro II. Soon after he graduated, he entered the Escola Politécnica do Rio de Janeiro, but was forced to abandon it in 1904 in order to take care of his brothers, since his father's mental health was starting to deteriorate.

Barreto wrote for newspapers beginning in 1902, but he achieved fame in 1905, writing a series of articles for the Correio da Manhã regarding the demolition of Castle Hill. In 1911 he founded, together with some friends, the periodical Floreal. Although it only lasted for two issues, it received a warm reception from critics. In 1909 he published his first novel, Recordações do Escrivão Isaías Caminha, a scathing and semi-autobiographical satire of the Brazilian society. However, his masterpiece is generally considered to be Triste Fim de Policarpo Quaresma, first serialized in 1911, in the feuilleton form, then published in hardcover form in 1915.

During the last years of his life, Barreto was attacked by heavy bouts of depression, which led him to alcoholism and many visits to different psychiatric hospitals and sanatoriums. He died of a heart attack in 1922.

== Style ==
Bruzundanga's literature is ruled by cute, rhyming and tasteless sonnets.

— Os Bruzundangas, in which Lima Barreto criticizes the Brazilian literature

Barreto was a very satirical author. His favoured target of criticism was the perceived mediocrity of the Brazilian people, mainly the government and the commercial/military authorities. One of his works that best represents this style is Os Bruzundangas, a collection of tales he published in newspapers during a period of 20 years.

The author also heavily criticized the baroque and difficult writing style which was popular among Brazilian authorities as a symbol of "intelligence" and "high social status". Due to his feelings on this issue, Barreto adopted a more simple style in his books which was more accessible to a majority of the Brazilian people. This provoked an increasing number of criticisms against the author, who was persecuted by the Brazilian elite for his non-classical style.

Barreto also explored the psychological conditions of his characters, although he is not as well known for this as other prominent Lusophone writers like the Brazilian Joaquim Maria Machado de Assis or the Portuguese José Maria de Eça de Queiroz. His books often explore the curious beliefs and thoughts of his characters: for example, Policarpo Quaresma (Barreto's most legendary creation) was a radical and almost utopian patriot, and his beliefs led him to a tragic end. Policarpo was also innocent enough to believe the Brazilian "original nature" could be restored. Exaggerated innocence had also condemned the character Clara dos Anjos to a life of dishonor. As for the antagonists, Barreto explores their hypocrisy, ignorance and indifference to the suffering of others. Psychopathy is presented in his posthumous book Clara dos Anjos through the antagonist, Cassi Jones, who has typical habits of a social psychopath: absence of care for other people's feelings, selfishness and cold calculation to achieve his goals, no matter how vile they are.

== Major works ==
=== Triste Fim de Policarpo Quaresma ===
Triste Fim de Policarpo Quaresma (in English: The Tragic Fate of Policarpo Quaresma) is Barreto's magnum opus, first published in 1911. It tells the story of Policarpo Quaresma, a radical Brazilian patriot. Policarpo's dearest dream is to see Brazil as one of the world's most powerful nations. He notices many problems in the political and social structure of his country, realizing that Brazilian people love European culture more than their own country's and tries to change this reality.

The story, then, can be divided in three distinct parts:

The cultural reform
Policarpo Quaresma tries to change the Brazilian official language (Portuguese) to Tupi, a Native American language. He sends a letter to the Government, asking for the Tupi language to be adopted as the official language of Brazil. His curious request soon becomes news, and Policarpo is ridiculed by the local press. Quaresma then retreats to the town of Curuzu, in rural Rio de Janeiro, where he begins a new activity;
The agricultural reform
Policarpo constructs, with the help of an old black man, a little farm and tries to sell his products to the capital. His desire is to make people see how valuable could be the Brazilian lands. Unfortunately, a plague invades his field and he begins a little war against the ants and the vermin. A local politician then arrives in his home praying for electoral support, but Policarpo refuses the offer. Then, by revenge, the politician starts to damage Policarpo's farm. At this moment, Brazil has sunken into chaos due to popular revolutions, and Policarpo is recruited to the Revolta da Armada war;
The military reform
While trying to defend a fort, Policarpo sees many problems in the Brazilian military structure and sends a letter to the president, Floriano Peixoto, a rude and ignorant man, praying for better conditions for the war prisoners and the other soldiers of the fort. Floriano, when reads the letter, considers Policarpo a revolutionary man and condemns him to death. At the end of the story, Policarpo Quaresma is killed for high treason.

=== Os Bruzundangas ===
A collection of tales that Lima Barreto published in newspaper during the period of 20 years, approximately. It tells the life and customs of the People of Bruzundanga, an imaginary country that represents Brazil. In the book, tale by tale, Barreto tells of the corruption present in every sector of the Bruzundanga's life, from politics to education.

Lima Barreto decided to create a new country to represent Brazil in order to escape from politician and any other authority's persecution. In fact, The Bruzundangas itself is a great allegory to Brazilian famous personalities and public institutions. A notorious example can be found in the book's first chapter, which is called "Special Chapter": the narrator teaches about Bruzundanga's literature, which is conduced by the elitist school of the "Samoiedas". In this literary school, the students get satisfied "only with shallow literary appearances and an ordinary simulation of notoriety, sometimes because of their intellectual incapacity and some other times by a vicious and careless instruction", as Barreto himself wrote. In this case, the "Samoiedas' school" is an allegory to the Brazilian classical writing style, which was still heavily influenced by the Parnassianism and Symbolism.

=== Clara dos Anjos ===
This posthumous novel presents the character Clara dos Anjos, a girl from a poor family that lives in the suburb of Rio de Janeiro. The story is about Clara's passion for Cassi Jones, an unscrupulous boy and son of a richer family. Cassi, who has made an uncountable number of women pregnant and abandoned them all, seduces Clara for his libidinous purposes. Clara, who is innocent due her parents' severe protectionism, ends up pregnant. At the end, Cassi flees and Clara finds herself abandoned and "dishonored". In his book, Barreto intends to show how disgraced is the destiny of poor women in Brazil, as he demonstrates in Clara's last quote: "We are nothing in this life". More than that, however, the author also shows the hypocrisy of rich people (mainly represented by Cassi's mother, who constantly protects her son) and the absurd selfishness of the Brazilian youth (represented by the character Cassi Jones).

== List of works ==
=== Novels ===
- Recordações do Escrivão Isaías Caminha (1909)
- Triste Fim de Policarpo Quaresma (1911)
- Numa e a Ninfa (1915)
- Vida e Morte de M. J. Gonzaga de Sá (1919)
- Clara dos Anjos (1923, posthumous)

=== Novellas ===
- O Subterrâneo do Morro do Castelo (1905)
- As Aventuras do Dr. Bogoloff (1912)
- Cemitério dos Vivos (1956, posthumous and unfinished)

=== Short-story collections ===
- Histórias e Sonhos (1920)
- Outras Histórias (1952, posthumous)
- Contos Argelinos (1952, posthumous)

=== Crônica ===
- Os Bruzundangas (1923, posthumous)
- Bagatelas (1923, posthumous)
- Feiras e Mafuás (1953, posthumous)
- Vida Urbana (1953, posthumous)
- Coisas do Reino de Jambom (1956, posthumous)
- Marginália (1956, posthumous)
- Sátiras e Outras Subversões (2016, posthumous, edited by Felipe Botelho Corrêa)
