= Amores Roubados =

2014 Brazilian television series

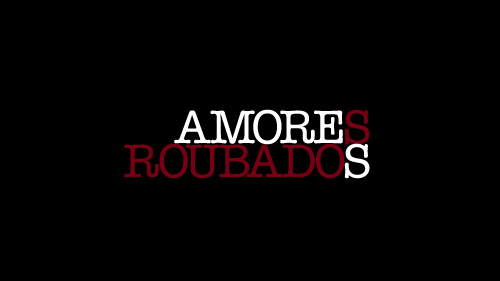
- Created by: George Moura
- Directed by: José Luiz Villamarim
- Starring: Murilo Benício; Patrícia Pillar; Cauã Reymond; Ísis Valverde; Osmar Prado; Dira Paes; Cássia Kis
- Country of origin: Brazil
- Original language: Portuguese
- No. of episodes: 10

Production
- Running time: 40 minutes

Original release
- Network: Rede Globo
- Release: 6 January – 17 January 2014

Amores Roubados (English title: Doomed) is a Brazilian miniseries produced by Rede Globo and displayed between 6–17 January 2014, totaling 10 episodes. Starring Cauã Reymond, Isis Valverde, Dira Paes, Patricia Pillar and Murilo Benicio in the lead roles.

== Plot ==
Passion knows no limits. Doomed tells the story of Leandro (Cauã Reymond), a sophisticated sommelier and a real Don Juan. After returning to his native city, he has a romance with Celeste (Dira Paes), who is married to a powerful businessman. Due to his insatiable appetite for women, he also becomes involved with Isabel (Patrícia Pillar), the wife of his boss, Jaime (Murilo Benício). For Leandro, seducing women is just a game until he is taken by surprise upon falling in love with Antônia (Isis Valverde), the couple’s daughter. This young girl makes him question his convictions and together, they are thrown into a thrilling story of desire, jealousy and revenge.

Antônia’s mother is discreet and totally devoted to her family. Torn between her daughter’s and her husband’s desires, she tries, unsuccessfully, to ease the bitter feelings between the two. Celeste, on the other hand, is a passionate and seductive woman who hides her affair with the sommelier from everyone.

When Leandro’s boss discovers his wife’s infidelity, his angry outburst coincides with the disappearance of his sommelier. Was it a planned escape or a crime of passion? The uncertainty only elevates the suspense in this explosive mixture of action, romance, mystery and sensuality.

== Cast ==
Actors	Character
Cauã Reymond	Leandro Dantas
Patrícia Pillar	Isabel Braga Favais
Murilo Benício	Jaime Favais
Ísis Valverde	Antônia Braga Favais
Dira Paes	Celeste Cavalcanti
Osmar Prado	Roberto Cavalcanti
Cássia Kis Magro	Carolina Dantas (Calu)
Irandhir Santos	João da Silva
Jesuíta Barbosa	Fortunato Dias
César Ferrario	Bigode de Arame
Germano Haiut	Antônio Vieira Braga
Thaysa Zooby	Ana Clara
Magdale Alves	Cleonice
Antonio Fabio	Deocleci
Walter Breda	Delegado Givaldo
Jorge Vasconcelos	Zarolho
Thierry Tremouroux	Oscar Beerhouse
Cláudio Jaborandy	Inspetor Britivaldo Bezerra
Lana Guelero	Sra. Bezerra
Zé Ramos	Zé Romão
João Fernando Walker	Thiago Cavalcanti
Paula Gariba Costa	Laura

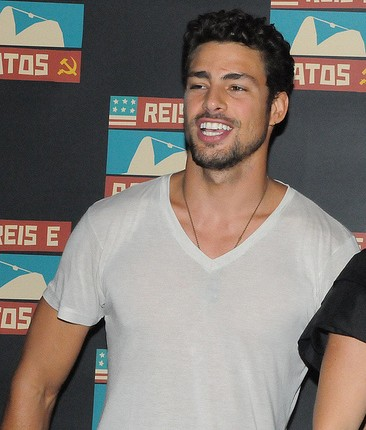
Cauã Reymond as Leandro.

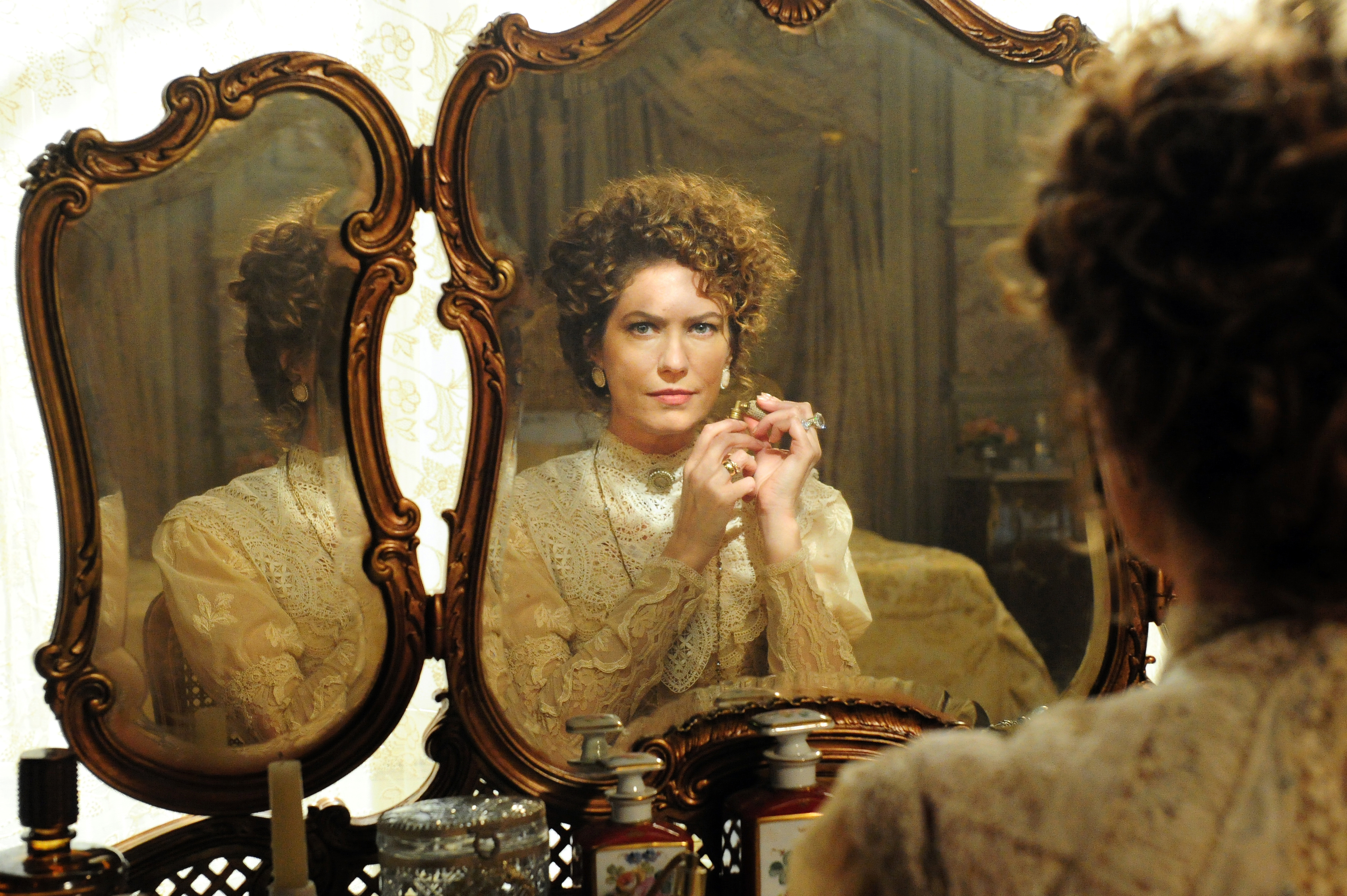
Patricia Pillar as Isabel.

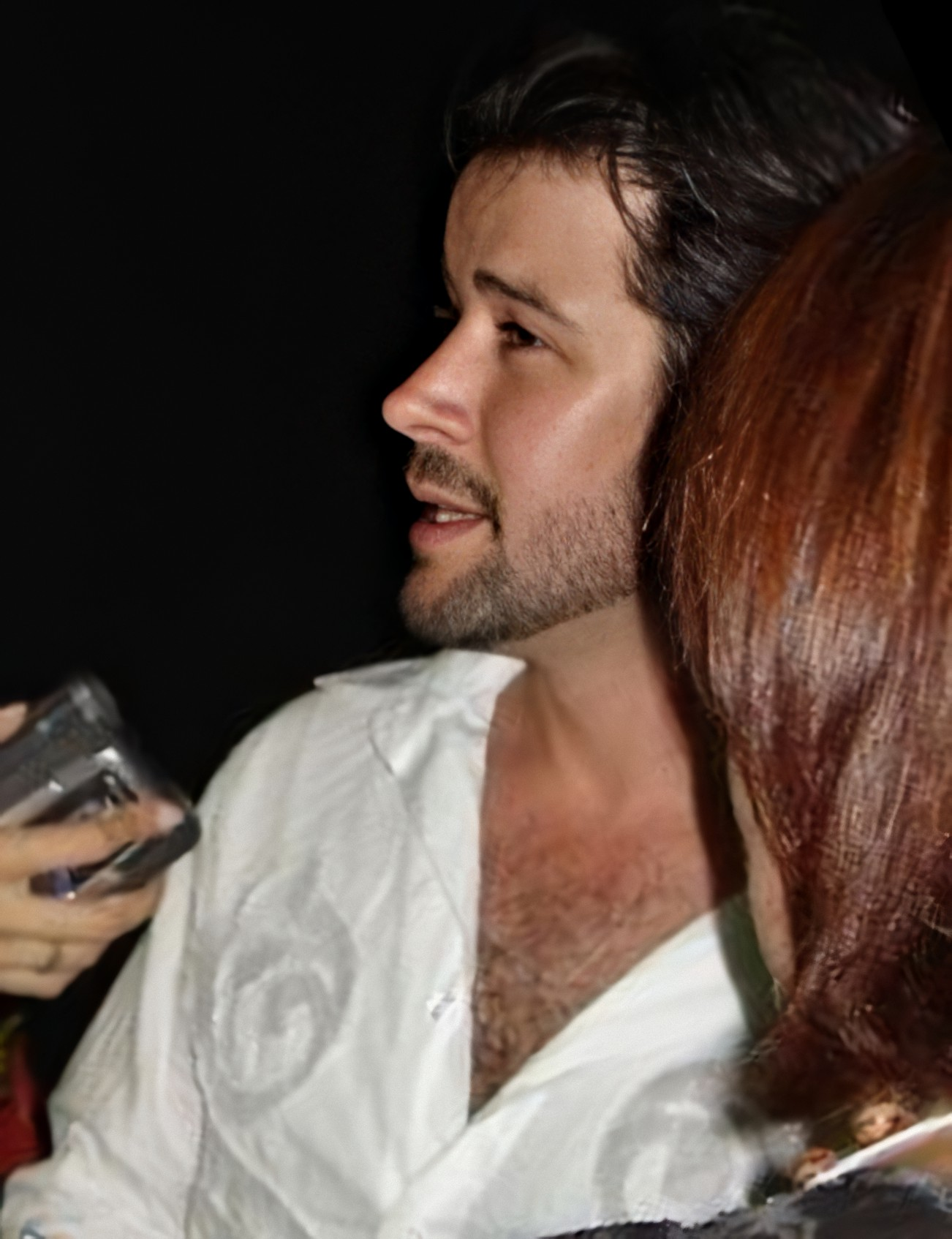
Murilo Benício as Jaime.

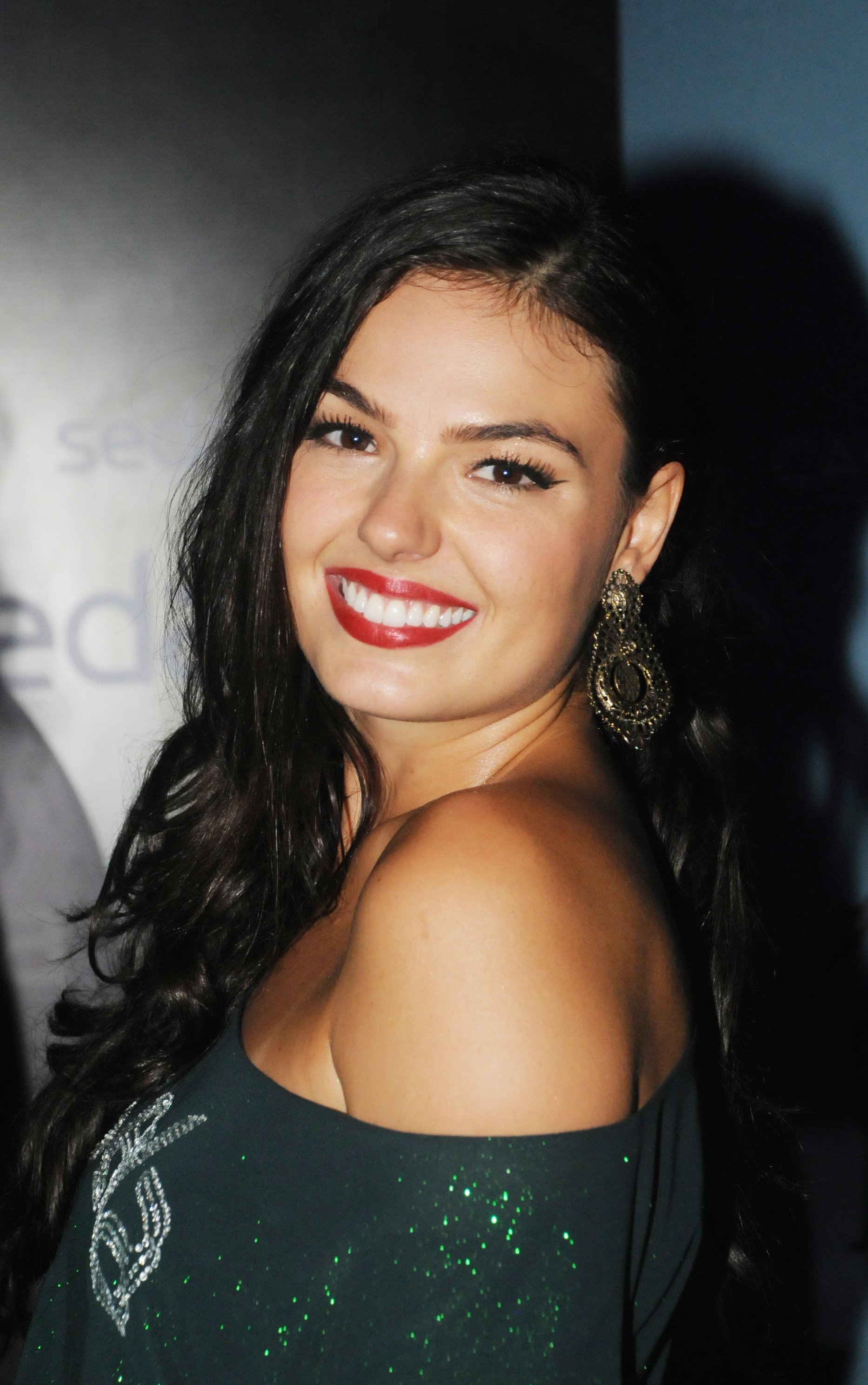
Ísis Valverde as Antônia.

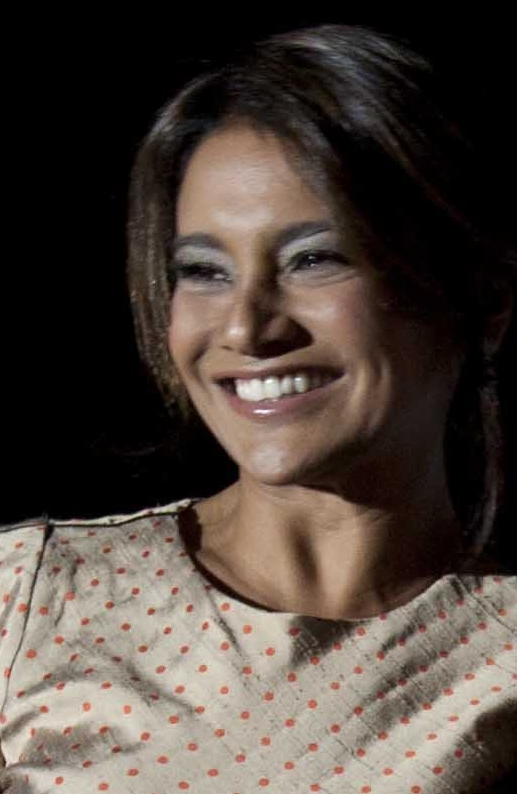
Dira Paes as Celeste.

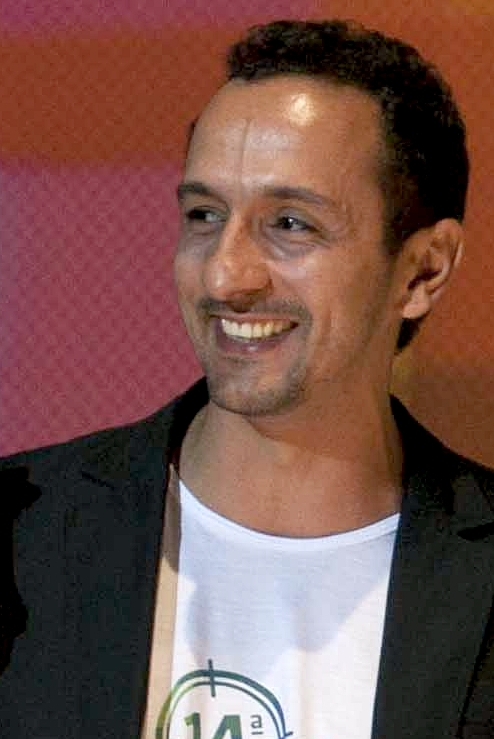
Irandhir Santos as João.

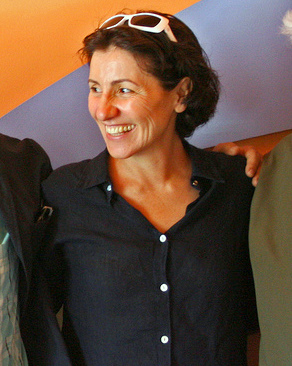
Cássia Kis Magro as Carolina.

== Production ==
The miniseries was recorded in Petrolina and Lagoa Grande in Pernambuco and Juazeiro and Paulo Afonso in Bahia. Some scenes were shot in other cities in Northeast Brazil. It was written by George Moura, Sergio Goldenberg, Flávio Araújo and Teresa Fleet, with text supervision of Maria Adelaide Amaral, and directed by José Luiz Villamarim and Ricardo Waddington.

The miniseries is an adaptation of the book A Emparedada da Rua Nova written by journalist and founder of Academia Pernambucana de Letras, Ram Vilela (1846–1913).
