= Umbuzeiro =

Coordinates: 7.69583°S 35.6597°W

Município de Umbuzeiro Municipality of Umbuzeiro
- Municipality
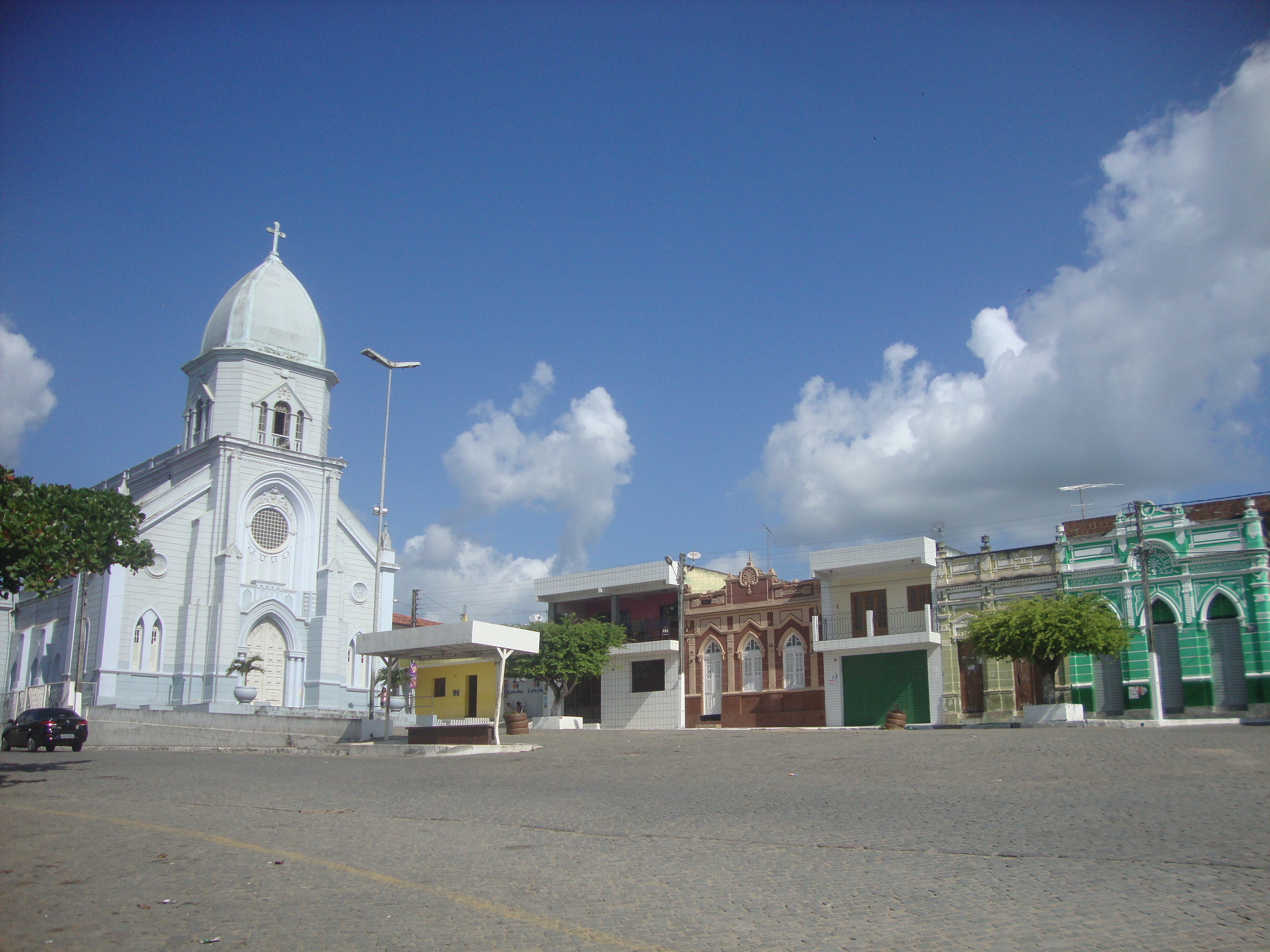
- View of the Church of Our Lady of Deliverance

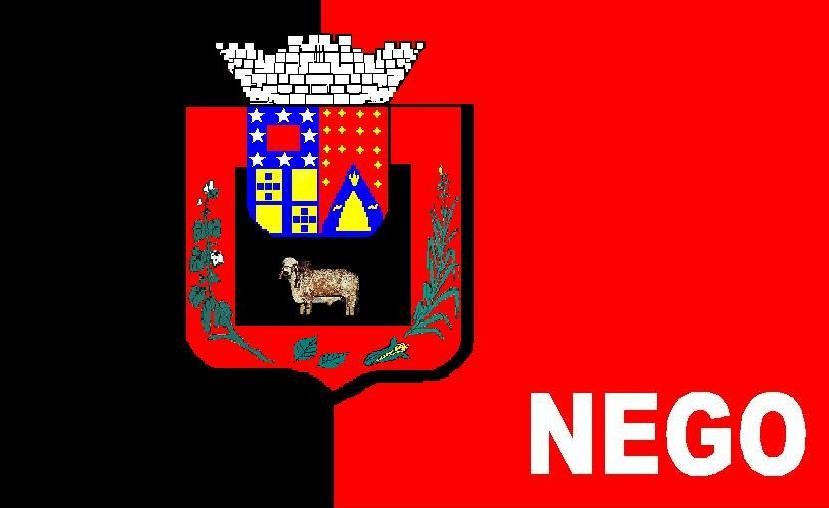
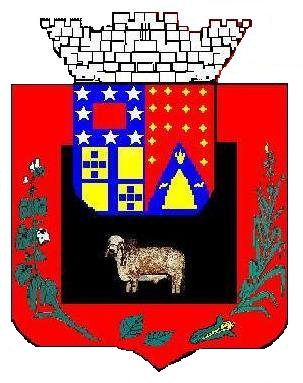
- Flag Coat of arms

- Country: Brazil
- Region: Northeast
- State: Paraíba
- Mesoregion: Agreste Paraibano

Population (2020)
  - Total: 9,911
- Time zone: UTC−3 (BRT)
- Website: https://www.umbuzeiro.pb.gov.br/

Umbuzeiro (Central northeastern portuguese pronunciation: [ũbuˈzeɾu]) is a municipality in the state of Paraíba in the Northeast Region of Brazil.

== Notable people ==
- Epitácio Pessoa, jurist, politician and 11th President of Brazil

== See also ==
- List of municipalities in Paraíba
