= Diários Associados =

Brazilian media conglomerate

S.A. Correio Braziliense
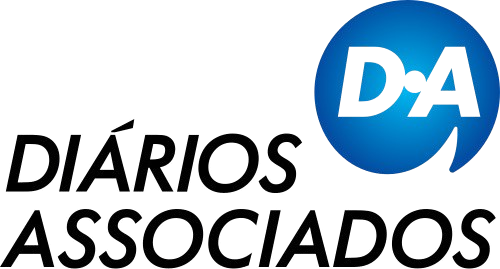
- Trade name: Diários Associados
- Type: Private
- Industry: Media conglomerate
- Founded: 12 October 1924; 102 years ago
- Founder: Assis Chateaubriand
- Headquarters: Brasília, DF, Brazil
- Key people: Álvaro Texeira da Costa (CEO)
- Products: Newspapers, Internet, Television
- Revenue: ▲US$ 1.1 Billion (2011)
- Number of employees: 4,647

The Diários Associados, or Associated Dailies, are a union of Brazilian communication media created by Assis Chateaubriand.

Diários Associados owned Rede Tupi, the first Brazilian television network, through its affiliate, the Rede de Emissoras Associadas, from 1950 to 1980.

Today, the group has 50 vehicles of communication, consisting of 15 newspapers, 12 radio networks, 8 television networks, 9 Internet portals and 5 other sites, 1 foundation and 5 other companies. The corporation was once the largest in the history of the press in Brazil.

== Newspapers ==
- Correio Braziliense (pt) — Brasília — DF
- Diário Mercantil (pt) — Rio de Janeiro — RJ
- O Diário de Natal (pt) — Natal — RN
- Estado de Minas (pt) — Belo Horizonte — MG
- Diário de Pernambuco (pt) — Recife — PE
- Jornal do Commercio (pt) — Rio de Janeiro — RJ
- Diário da Borborema (pt) — Campina Grande — PB
- O Imparcial (pt) — São Luís — MA
- O Norte (pt) — João Pessoa — PB
- Monitor Campista (pt) — Campos — RJ
- Aqui BH (pt) — Belo Horizonte — BH
- Aqui DF (pt) — Brasília — DF
- Aqui PE (pt) — Recife — PE
- Aqui MA (pt) — Sao Luis — MA
- Aqui CE (pt) — Fortaleza — CE

== Radio ==
- Clube FM (pt) — Belo Horizonte — MG
- Super Rádio Tupi (pt), formerly Rádio Tupi — Rio de Janeiro — RJ
- Nativa FM (pt) — Rio de Janeiro — RJ
- Clube FM (pt) — Recife — PE
- Clube FM (pt) — Brasília — DF
- Clube FM (pt) — Natal — RN
- Clube FM (pt) — João Pessoa — PB
- Rádio Clube AM (pt) — Brasília — DF
- Rádio Clube AM (pt) — Recife — PE
- Rádio Clube AM (pt) — Campina Grande — PB
- Rádio Clube AM (pt) — Natal — PB
- Rádio Clube AM (pt) — Fortaleza — CE

== Television ==
- TV Alterosa (pt) — Belo Horizonte — MG
- TV Alterosa (pt) — Divinópolis — MG
- TV Alterosa (pt) — Juiz de Fora — MG
- TV Alterosa (pt) — Varginha — MG
- TV Brasília (pt) — Brasília — DF
- TV Borborema (pt) — Campina Grande — PB
- TV Clube (pt) — Recife — PE
- TV Clube (pt) — João Pessoa — PB

== Portals ==
- Correio Web (pt) — Brasília — DF
- Dnonline (pt) — Natal — RN
- DB online - Campina Grande (pt) — PB
- Pernambuco.com (pt) — Recife — PE
- Dnonline (pt) — Natal — RN
- O Norte online (pt) — João Pessoa — PB
- UAI (UAI|pt) — Belo Horizonte — MG

== Other companies ==
- Fundação Assis Chateaubriand (pt) — Brasília — DF
- Teatro Alterosa (pt) — Belo Horizonte — BH
- Fazenda Manga (pt) — Manga — MG
- Alterosa Cine Video (pt) — Belo Horizonte — MG
- Revista Ragga (pt) — Belo Horizonte — MG
- D.A Press (pt) — Brasília — DF
- D.A Log (pt) — Brasília — DF
- Dzai (pt) — Belo Horizonte — MG
