= Assis Chateaubriand =

Brazilian journalist and entrepreneur (1892–1968)

- Assis Chateaubriand in 1957
- Born: 4 October 1892; Umbuzeiro, Paraíba, Brazil
- Died: 4 April 1968 (aged 75); São Paulo, São Paulo, Brazil
- Education: Recife's Law Faculty
- Occupations: Businessman, journalist, patron, politician, lawyer, university professor and writer

Francisco de Assis Chateaubriand Bandeira de Melo (pronounced [fɾɐ̃ˈsisku dʒi aˈsis ʃɐtobɾiˈɐ̃ bɐ̃ˈdejɾɐ dʒi ˈmɛlu]), also nicknamed Chatô (October 4, 1892 – April 4, 1968), was a Brazilian lawyer, journalist, politician and diplomat. He was founder and director of the prominent media conglomerate of Brazil, the Diários Associados including: 34 newspapers, 36 radio stations, 18 television stations, one news agency, one weekly magazine (O Cruzeiro), one monthly magazine (A Cigarra) as well as many magazines for children.

During the 1940s and 1950s, he became notable in Brazil for his work as a journalist, an entrepreneur, an arts patron as well as a politician. Chateaubriand was appointed Ambassador of Brazil to the United Kingdom, a position he held from 1957 to 1961. He was also a lawyer and professor of law, writer and member of the Brazilian Academy of Letters, occupying its 37th chair from 1954 until his death in 1968.

== Early life ==
Chateaubriand was born in Umbuzeiro, state of Paraíba, in the Northeast of Brazil, on October 4, 1892, the son of Francisco José Bandeira de Melo and his wife, Maria Carmem Guedes Gondim.

Chateaubriand married Maria Henriqueta Barroso do Amaral, who was the daughter of attorney Judge Zózimo Barroso do Amaral, and had one son, Fernando, with her.

== Career ==
Chateaubriand was born into poor conditions, living in a wattle and daub house and only learning to read at the age of 10. He started working as a journalist at the age of 15, working for the newspaper Gazeta do Norte. He also wrote for Jornal Pequeno and Diário de Pernambuco. In 1917, having moved to Rio de Janeiro, he worked for Correio da Manhã. In this newspaper, he would publish his impressions about his trip to Europe, in 1920.

In the state of Pernambuco, as a young lawyer, he gained fame for a series of verbal clashes with various political and literary figures. At the same time, he managed, to become Professor of Roman Law at the Law Faculty of Recife in his 20's, being formally appointed for the post only after various clashes with the state's politicos, among them General Dantas Barreto and Dr. Manuel Borba. What finally settled the battle was a telegram from the president of the republic, Venceslau Brás, on December 8, 1915. His victory in attaining the position as professor further became a platform for his even more ambitious goal; to own a newspaper of his own by the age of thirty.

In 1924, Chatô became the director of O Jornal. This was his first step toward building his press empire, to which were added important newspapers from Brazil, such as Diário de Pernambuco (the oldest newspaper in Latin America) and Jornal do Commercio (the oldest newspaper in Rio de Janeiro). In the following year, a newspaper from São Paulo was added to his press conglomerate: Diário da Noite. In 1929, Chateaubriand added to Diários Associados another newspaper: Estado de Minas, now the most famous, influential and respected of that conglomerate.

Chateaubriand earned a reputation as a self-made man, who had no scruples about approaching and lobbying for influential people who might be serviceable to his personal interests; already as a teenager, he had already made friends with the powerful local Lundgren family of industrialists.

After moving to Rio, Chateaubriand worked as a journalist and lawyer, and it was in the latter capacity that he made friends with influential people, especially magnates connected with the interests of foreign corporations who wanted to hedge through lobbying against nationalist politics, among them the public utilities São Paulo Tramway, Light and Power Company CEO Alexander McKenzie and the American mining magnate Percival Farquhar.

Chateaubriand was a media mogul in Brazil between the late 1930s and the early 1960s and the owner of Diários Associados, a conglomerate that counted at its peak more than a hundred newspapers, radio and TV stations, magazines and a telegraphic agency. He is also known as the co-creator and founder, in 1947, of the São Paulo Museum of Art (MASP), together with Pietro Maria Bardi.

On September 25, 1935, Chateaubriand inaugurated Rádio Tupi (pt) in a ceremony attended by the inventor of radio Guglielmo Marconi, who, ten days earlier, had broadcast the first musical program with a 120-voice orchestra performing the Brazilian National Anthem and was conducted by conductor Villa-Lobos. In its beginning, the station was known as "Cacique do Ar", also being called by its prefix PRG-3 or, simply, G-3.

Chateubriand also founded the first television network of Latin America and the fifth in the world (Tupi TV). He was Senator of the Republic between 1952 and 1957.

After becoming a press tycoon, he eventually combined undeniable journalistic feeling with a totally unscrupulous behaviour, using as his main tool for money making the most extensive use of libel and blackmail, directed against magnates and authorities.: in the promotion of his pet projects – as in his campaign for the building of airports and training of pilots across Brazil – he would resort to any means whatsoever, having even ordered his thugs to shoot a German businessman who refused to be blackmailed by him Later in life, he would refurbish his São Paulo Museum of Art (MASP) with a whole collection of old European masters' works purchased at bargain prices in impoverished post-WW II Europe, by using funds extorted through blackmail from various Brazilian businessmen. Chateaubriand never made a great secret about his peculiar business strategies: "excellency in business means buying without money" he once allegedly said.

He died on April 4, 1968, in São Paulo, from a persistent disease, in which he resisted for years, continuing to write his articles, even though he was paraplegic and was unable to speak.

== Historical influence ==
An often polemic and controversial figure, hated and feared, Chateaubriand has also been nicknamed "the Brazilian Citizen Kane" and accused of unethical behavior, for allegedly blackmailing companies that did not place ads in his media vehicles, and for insulting entrepreneurs with lies (such as industry owner Count Francesco Matarazzo). His empire would have been built based on political interests and agreements, including tumultuous but profitable ties with Brazilian President Getúlio Vargas.

Regarded by some as having formed the basis for a modern Brazilian press and mass culture, Francisco de Assis Chateaubriand Bandeira de Melo's power over the Brazilian media – as well as his lack of scruples, his upstart drive and gangster-like ethos – during his height from the 1920s and well into the '60s can be compared to that of William Randolph Hearst in the USA. Chateaubriand was one of the most influential individuals in Brazilian history. He was known for having strong ties to the current leaders within both politics and economy. With a career as solicitor, journalist, media mogul, ambassador and senator, he often was the decisive drop on the scale of political campaigns and decisions. He was part of the creation of presidents and the undisputed ruler of Brazilian press. At the same time, he always lacked a clear ideological agenda – except for being a staunch partisan of the untrammeled Free Market and of consented submission to imperialist interests. At the end of his life – especially after a stroke in 1960, that left him speechless, using a wheelchair and communicating with others mostly by means of notes typed in a specially adapted typewriter – he had become a clownish shadow of himself, "a blackmailer who acted as an interloper in the power game of the ruling class". His media empire, after decades of personal financial mismanagement, quickly declined after his death. In the new ambience of a modernized Brazil, he was quickly dislocated by the new professionally managed, streamlined and more ideologically coherent Rede Globo.

== Books ==
- Morais, Fernando (1994). Chatô – O rei do Brasil (1st ed.). São Paulo: Editora Schwarcz LTDA (Cia. das Letras). ISBN 85-7164-396-2.

Preceded by Getúlio Vargas	Brazilian Academy of Letters – Occupant of the 37th chair 1954–1968	Succeeded by João Cabral de Melo Neto
