= RedeTV! Recife =

RedeTV! Recife (ZYQ 107)
- Recife, Pernambuco; Brazil
- Channels: Digital: 25 (UHF); Virtual: 6

Programming
- Affiliations: RedeTV!

Ownership
- Owner: TV Ômega Ltda.

History
- First air date: March 3, 1984
- Former call signs: ZYB 301 (1984-2017)
- Former names: Rede Manchete Recife (1984–1999); TV! Recife (1999)
- Former channel numbers: Analog: 6 (VHF, 1984–2017)
- Former affiliations: Rede Manchete

Technical information
- Licensing authority: ANATEL
- ERP: 18 kW
- HAAT: 112 m (367 ft)
- Transmitter coordinates: 7°59′56.2″S 34°52′10.1″W

Links
- Public license information: Profile
- Website: redetv.uol.com.br

RedeTV! Recife (channel 6) is a RedeTV!-owned-and-operated station licensed to Recife, Pernambuco, Brazil. Its studios are located on the sixth floor of Edifício José Borba Maranhão, in the Santo Amaro neighborhood, and its transmitters are located on TV Globo Pernambuco's tower, in the same neighborhood.

== History ==
=== Background ===
On July 23, 1980, the Ministry of Communications opened a public tender for nine television licenses in Brazil, seven of which coming from Rede Tupi, which were closed on July 16 due to administrative problems, and two from stations that have not been occupied for years. The bid was disputed by some conglomerates, while, on March 19, 1981, Grupo Silvio Santos and Grupo Bloch emerged as winners, with Bloch taking the licenses in Rio de Janeiro, Belo Horizonte, Fortaleza and Recife, as well as the inoperative license in São Paulo. The group already operated in the magazine sector and had a network of radio stations, and aimed with these channels to create Rede Manchete, thus entering the television market.

In Recife, where Grupo Bloch was already present with the Manchete magazine and Manchete FM, launched in 1980, part of the radio network of the same name, the license corresponded to VHF canal 6, which operated from 1960 to 1980 as TV Rádio Clube, a Rede Tupi affiliate. TV Manchete took advantage of its technical infrastructure and most of its staff, as well as continuing a project from the former station to build a concrete tower with Oscar Niemeyer's architecture. There was also the conception of a cultural center consisting of a two-floor building and a theater with a capacity of 2,000 attendants, which was never achieved. Its main headquarters were located at a terrain in Ouro Preto, in Olinda, city close to Recife, donated by the mayorate, which was left unused since when the Fosforita factory left the location after declaring bankruptcy, in 1968, while the office was to be located in downtown Recife.

In February 1983, TV Manchete teams initiated work for the creation of its archives covering a dance event at Clube Português do Recife. Grupo Bloch's plan was to open the station on July 17 that year, however, technical programs delayed its launch to October, when the owned-and-operated stations in Rio de Janeiro, São Paulo e Belo Horizonte were already on air and later, no projected date. Concomitantly, construction work for the tower continued for one year, only finishing in January 1984. The structure had a height of 80 meters and a restaurant with a panoramic view of the city on top.

=== Channel 6 on air ===
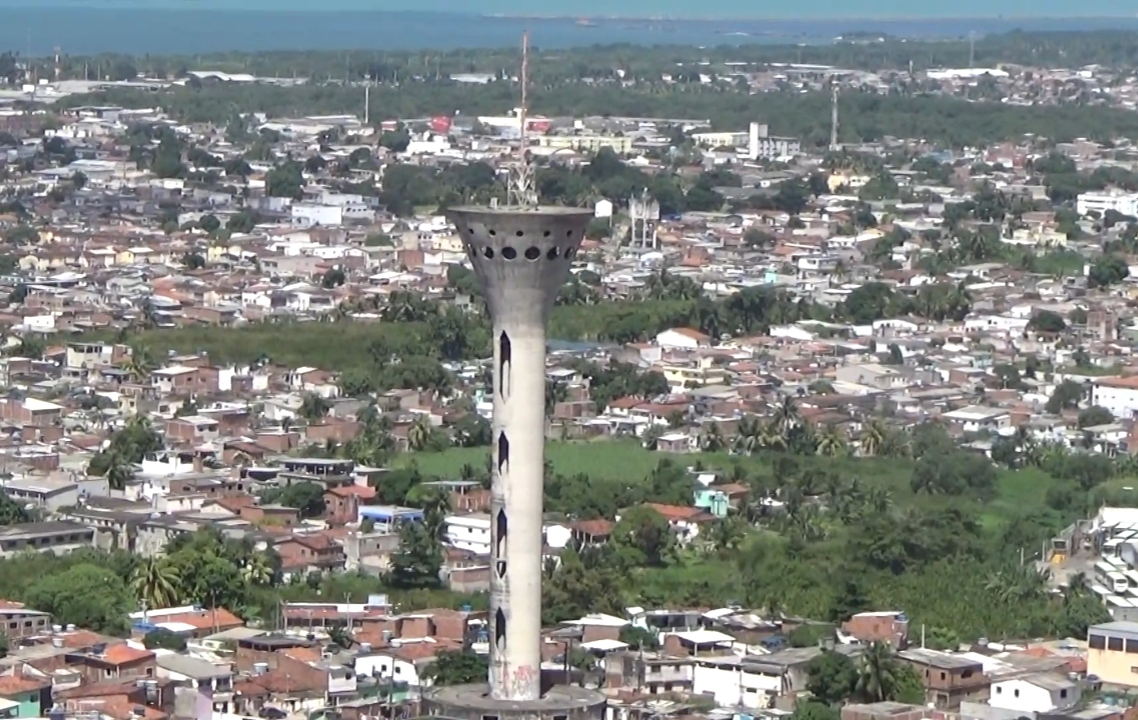
Transmission tower used by TV Manchete Recife, in Olinda

TV Manchete Recife opened at 5pm on March 3, 1984, airing Capiba e o Frevo, a special directed by filmmaker Nelson Pereira dos Santos about musician Capiba, with his participation, in which local personalities performed his compositions; the special aired nationwide on Rede Manchete. After that, the station started relaying the live coverage of the Rio Carnaval, produced by the network, and on March 7, after the end of the coverage, it aired O Mundo Mágico, a music show that opened Rede Manchete's activities in the previous year.

In this initial period, the transmitting tower distributed its signal outside of the vicinity of Recife, also being received in Caruaru, in the inland of Pernambuco, and in the archipelago of Fernando de Noronha. The station was also relayed in other locations of the Brazilian Northeast, elevating it to the post of the regional headquarters of the network.

TV Manchete Recife initiated its activities producing news reports for the network, but without producing local programming. When construction work for the building was finished, in September 1984, it premiered the news bulletin Pernambuco Agora, shown during evenings from April 1, 1985 to January 20, 1986. From October 22, 1985 to January 28, 1986, Linha Direta went on air, a weekly interview program presented by Ney Gonçalves Dias, who was already hired by the network and went to Pernambuco to record them at the TV Universitária studios through a partnership while TV Manchete's were under construction. The program, which received state personalities from different sectors, was shown in the 10pm slot and aired on Rede Manchete nationwide, registering "good audience ratings" according to Diario de Pernambuco. On April 27, 1987, TV Manchete Recife, following the pattern established by the network, premiered Nordeste em Manchete, later renamed Pernambuco em Manchete, shown nightly for fifteen minutes. Like the other stations, it roduced local editions of Manchete Esportiva,as well as coverage of the Pernambuco Carnaval, especially that of Olinda, shown nationwide on the network.

=== Sales ===
On June 9, 1992, Grupo Bloch's radio and TV stations, including TV Manchete Recife, were sold to businessman Hamilton Lucas de Oliveira. Control of the assets was given back to Adolpho Bloch on April 23, 1993 after the cancellacion of the sale by the federal government, under allegations that Indústria Brasileira de Formulários, Oliveira's company, did not pay the total value of the investment. In November 1995, with Bloch's death, his nephew Pedro Jack Kapeller became the head of Rede Manchete.

On May 9, 1999, due to the crisis caused by Rede Manchete's unstable financial situation, its owned-and-operated stations in Rio de Janeiro, São Paulo, Belo Horizonte, Fortaleza and Recife were sold to Amilcare Dallevo Jr., owner of TeleTV, and on the following day, the documentation making the transfer official was given over to the Minister of Communications. The acquisition was authorized in a decree published on Diário Oficial da União on May 17, and the entire network moved to a transitional phase serving as an expectation for what would become RedeTV!, which happened on November 15 of the same year.

=== RedeTV! Recife ===
RedeTV! continued using TV Manchete's tower to deliver its analog signal in the Greater Recife metropolitan area until 2017 and it left the following year, paying during the entire period the rent to the network's bankrupt estates. Since then, the building to the side started being occupied by homeless people, who sought to preserve the construct. The tower is subject to listing requests, one of which being held by Sociedade Olindense de Defesa da Cidade Alta ao Conselho de Preservação dos Sítios Históricos de Olinda and the other in 2017 by Associação da Imprensa de Pernambuco à Fundação do Patrimônio Histórico e Artístico de Pernambuco.

Part of TV Manchete Recife's tape archive, which was archived on the base of its tower, ended up being damaged devido due to damaging that occurred over time. According to reports of staff that worked at the station, there was no interest in the bankrupt estate of the network in recovering it.

In November 2010, RedeTV! Recife had plans to introduce a local news program, as part of the network's investments for 2011. For this end, the network announced the establishment of a correspondent base.

== Technical information ==
Channel	Video	Aspect	Short name	Programming
6.1	1080i	16:9	REDETV! HD	Main RedeTV! Recife programming / RedeTV!

== Bibliography ==
- Francfort, Elmo (2008). Rede Manchete: Aconteceu, Virou História (PDF). Aplauso. São Paulo: Imprensa Oficial do Estado de São Paulo. ISBN 978-8570605894.
