= Newsfluencer =

Influencer who produces news content

A newsfluencer, also news influencer or journo-influencer, is an influencer who creates content on current events and civic issues on social media platforms. People who fall into this category include self-employed journalists, Substack writers, podcasters, YouTubers, TikTok journalists, and Twitch streamers. The genres these influencers embrace span from imitating news reporting inspired by that of Walter Cronkite, to providing commentary on and critiques of news stories they find interesting or troubling.

In contrast to journalists working with traditional news media companies who offer original reporting that is carefully researched and verified, newsfluencers prioritize speed so they can create and distribute their content quickly. They also benefit from the perception that they are approachable and that the news they share is peer-centered. Some newsfluencers expand on existing news stories by dissecting news representations and critiquing the viewpoints of differing news outlets. Others are influencers who occasionally insert news commentary into their feeds.

== Origins ==
The rise of newsfluencer can be traced back to the early 2020s, as news consumption increasingly shifted to social media platforms. Following their audiences, news brands as well as individual journalists began to adopt social media to expand their reach. Simultaneously, some online content creators have started to engage in activities resembling journalism, uncovering facts, reporting on current events and offering analysis. During the 2020 United States presidential election, Twitch streamer Hasan Piker live streamed for eleven hours, keeping himself on camera as he followed and shared election results in an unpolished way that "reflected [his audiences'] own news consumption practices".

In 2024, the Pew Research Center reported that just over half of U.S. adults (54%) say that they get news at least sometimes from social media apps, with about one third saying that they regularly get news from Facebook and YouTube. The Reuters Digital News Report, which is based on data from six continents and 48 markets, found that about a third of people around the world report using Facebook (36%) and YouTube (30%) for news every week.

In September 2024, "newsfluencer" was defined as "platformatised creators who operate according to the economic and cultural logics of online influencers to produce news content for participatory audiences". Newsfluencers come from varied professional and amateur backgrounds, including former journalists to independent content creators, who are able to create timely and relatable news coverage in "Facetime-style videos" compared to traditional news media.

According to the survey conducted in 2022 for the Reuters Institute Digital News Report, audiences today perceive journalists as including YouTubers, podcasters, comedians, authors, and social media influencers. The study found that these ‘alternative’ or ‘independent’ actors accounted for 15% of all named journalists in the United States, a figure higher than in any other of the researched countries.

== White House briefings ==
In January 2025, White House Press Secretary Karoline Leavitt announced an initiative to increase access to the White House for podcasters, bloggers, and social media influencers. More than 7,400 requests for the "new media" passes were received within the first 24 hours of this announcement. Critics called the change "part of the authoritarian playbook" and "bad news for democracy in the 'land of the liberty and the home of the First Amendment."

In April, Leavitt began holding separate briefings specifically for social media news influencers instead of credentialled journalists. All of the newfluencers who attended that week's briefings had a history of "clear support for Trump," and asked "a combination of softball questions, overt praise for Trump, false information and conspiracy theories," the Index for Censorship said.

The change was highly criticized for giving a false sense of legitimacy to people who "are not as strict with the truth as people in the actual news industry." At one of the briefings, Dom Lucre, a highly-followed conspiracy theorist on X, asked Leavitt whether Barack Obama and Hillary Clinton would ever be investigated for election integrity. Leavitt said McGee’s question was “refreshing” and that “the legacy media would never ask” it.

== Criticisms ==
Media watchdog NewsGuard found that 20 percent of TikTok's news search results contained misinformation. Traditional news media companies, like NBC News, and academics have criticized some newsfluencers of asking uncritical questions or showing overt bias towards people they are interviewing.

A 2024 survey of 500 newsfluencers across 45 countries from UNESCO found "63% of influencers lack rigorous fact-checking protocols, despite their significant impact on public discourse." Unlike journalists, who use rigorous fact-checking methods, the report also found 42% of newsfluencers use "likes" and "shares" as the primary way to determine whether information is credible.

== Examples ==
Examples of newsfluencers include:

- Aaron Parnas, lawyer and political content creator
- Hugo Travers (HugoDéCrypte), French journalist
- Jack Mac, comments on news reports that they find interesting
- Hasan Piker (HasanAbi), Twitch streamer who comments on politics
- V Spehar, creator of Under The Desk News
- Lisa Remillard, also known as "The News Girl", has a background in traditional journalism
- Sarah Baus, lifestyle influencer who covered the TikTok ban

== See also ==
- Celebrity culture
- Digital journalism
- Influencer
- Influencer marketing
- Netizen
- Online newsroom
- Online streamer
- Opinion leadership
- Social media and politics
- Social media as a news source
- Social media marketing
- Social media newsroom
- Social news website
