= RedeTV! Fortaleza =

RedeTV! Fortaleza (ZYA 425)
- Fortaleza, Ceará; Brazil
- Channels: Digital: 34 (UHF); Virtual: 2

Programming
- Affiliations: RedeTV!

Ownership
- Owner: TV Ômega Ltda.

History
- First air date: February 12, 1984
- Former names: Rede Manchete Fortalza (1984–1999); TV! Fortaleza (1999)
- Former channel numbers: Analog: 2 (VHF, 1984–2017)
- Former affiliations: Rede Manchete

Technical information
- Licensing authority: ANATEL
- ERP: 9 kW
- HAAT: 112 m (367 ft)
- Transmitter coordinates: 3°44′46.8″S 38°30′1.1″W

Links
- Public license information: Profile
- Website: redetv.uol.com.br

RedeTV! Fortaleza (channel 2) is a RedeTV!-owned-and-operated station licensed to Fortaleza, Ceará, Brazil. It relays the entire network schedule, generated in São Paulo, to the capital and neighboring areas, without producing local programs, only producing reports for the network.

== History ==
On July 18, 1980, TV Ceará was one of the Rede Tupi affiliates to shut down per DENTEL's orders. With its closure, the government decided to issue a public tender to redistribute the seven licenses, in addition to the former TV Excelsior license in São Paulo, as well as the former TV Continental license in Rio de Janeiro, for two new networks (Network A and Network B). On March 19, 1981, Adolpho Bloch gained four former Tupi licenses (Rio de Janeiro, Belo Horizonte, Recife and Fortaleza) and TV Excelsior São Paulo for Network A and Silvio Santos, the Tupi licenses in São Paulo, Porto Alegre and Belém for Network B. These networks became Manchete and SBT respectively.

At the time of the plans to create the network's headquarters in Rio de Janeiro, plans to build the facilities for the four other Manchete O&Os began. While the network began in the southeastern capitals on June 5, 1983, the northeastern capitals did not receive the network until 1984, specifically, in Fortaleza, until February 12 that year. The delay in establishing the stations in Fortaleza and Recife was due to technical problems that the existing stations were facing since the beginning, and that initiating its operations ahead of schedule would undermine Manchete's strict quality standards. The station was headquartered at Antônio Sales Avenue, in the Dionísio Torres neighborhood, in a building built by Oscar Niemeyer. Its launch consisted of a repeat of what the southeastern stations saw the previous year, the variety special O Mundo Mágico and the feature film Close Encounters of the Third Kind.

The station initially did not produce local programming, but it did have a local reporting team, directed by Ruy Lima. Production of local news under the Ceará em Manchete brand started in 1987, when the network's five owned-and-operated stations had to boost their production capabilities. The station also produced the local edition of Manchete Esportiva and, in the network's later years, Tarde Jovem (with Ênio Carlos) and Programa Paulo Oliveira.

In May 1999, after the network was hit by a financial crisis, the five Manchete stations were sold to Amílcare Dallevo, who eventually created a transitional network, RedeTV! (branded on air as TV!), which became definitive in November. The station became HD-capable in 2009, when the network's southeastern O&Os had started digital broadcasts; however, RedeTV!'s main headquarters in São Paulo decide what footage is seen on the network.

== Technical information ==
Channel	Video	Aspect	Short name	Programming
2.1	1080i	16:9	REDETV! HD	Main RedeTV! Fortaleza programming / RedeTV!

=== Analog-to-digital conversion ===
The station started its digital broadcasts on August 17, 2010, on virtual UHF channel 34, relaying the RedeTV! network feed from São Paulo, while its local programming only began in 2012. In April 2016, it started relaying the network feed again, without local inserts. In September 2017, the transmitter's power increased, and the station started airing its local programming in high definition.

Initially, and alongside the other RedeTV! O&Os, the station carried a 3D simulcast, on channel 2.2. This feed was discontinued in June 2015, but the channel continued simulcasting 2.1 until it was deactivated in April 2016. On February 19, 2021, the station reactivated channel 2.2, airing Universo EADTV, as part of a RedeTV! partnership with Cesumar University.

Its analog signal on channel 2 shut down on September 27, 2017, alongside other television stations in Fortaleza.

== Programming ==
The station only has one reporting team. From November 2009 to 2022, journalist Emerson Tchalian was the station's regional news editor and also its news reporter. Tchalian was also responsible for RedeTV!'s management in Fortaleza. With his return to São Paulo to become editor-in-chief and special reporter, Marcelo Espíndola became the station's regional reporter. The station also promoted electoral debates in its studios at Antônio Sales Avenue.

In 2011, RedeTV! Fortaleza hired staff from other stations, such as journalist Luis Esteves, from TV Verdes Mares, in April, to develop a project for a local program, which was never achieved. With that, the presenter ended up returning to his former station in August that year. In 2018, the station hired, for a brief period, reporter Ramon Gomes, who produced a few reports seen on the national network. Later, the reporter was hired by TV Metrópole.
