= List of programs broadcast by RedeTV! =

This is a list of programs broadcast by RedeTV!, which has operated in Brazil since 1999. The programming of this network includes news, comedy, talk shows, music, reality shows, sports, series and variety shows.

The company also broadcasts on different channels, which also have specialized programs for different audiences. Most network programs are produced in the complex transmission network in the city of Osasco, São Paulo.

== Current programs ==
=== Comedy ===
- A Hora do Zap (2023–present)
- Madrugada Animada (2024–present)

=== News ===
- Brasil do Povo (2025–present)
- É Notícia (2008–2013, 2023–present)
- Leitura Dinâmica (1999–present)
- PODK Liberados (2024–present)
- RedeTV! News (2005–present)

=== Sports ===
- American Zone (2025–present)
- Bola na Rede (1999–2010; 2011–2020; 2025-present)

==== Coverage ====
- Campeonato Brasileiro Série B (2005–2010; 2014–2017; 2025-present)
- Bundesliga (2023–present)
- Copa HB20 (2021–present)
- NASCAR Brasil Series (2025–present)
- Endurance Brasil (2025–present)
- Brazil national futsal team matches (2025–present)

=== Reality shows ===
Title	Presenter	Run
Operação de Risco (COPS)	Jorge Lordello	2010–present

=== Game shows ===
Title	Presenter	Run
Mega Senha (Million Dollar Password); Mega Sonho	Marcelo de Carvalho	2010–present
O Céu é o Limite (L'eredità)	Marcelo de Carvalho	2017–2018, reruns
Hipercap Brasil	Ciro Bottini	2024–present

=== Talk show ===
- Sensacional (2015–present)
- Companhia Certa (2024–present)

=== Varieties ===
- A Tarde É Sua (2006–present)
- Fica com a Gente (2024–present)
- Manhã com Você (2025–present)
- Para Aqui! (2025–present)
- Superpop (1999–present)
- TV Fama (1999; 2000–present)

== Miscellaneous programming ==
=== Game/reality shows ===
- Chega Mais/Conexão Models (2015–2019)
- Sob Medida (2013–2015)
- The Bachelor Brasil (The Bachelor) (2014)
- Estação Teen (2012)
- Sexo a 3 (2012)
- O Último Passageiro (The Last Passenger) (2010–2013)
- Taxi do Milão (Cash Cab) (2010)
- Receita Pop (Ready Steady Cook) (2010)
- The Amazing Race: A Corrida Milionária (The Amazing Race) (2007–2008)
- Clube das Mulheres (2008)
- GAS Sound (2007–2008)
- Insomnia (2004–2007)
- Apartamento das Modelos (2002)
- Interligado (1999–2003; 2009–2011)
- A Melhor Viagem (2019–2020)
- O Desafiante (The Contender (TV series) (2006)
- Dr. Hollywood (Dr. 90210) (2007–2012; 2017)
- Imersão (2021)
- Operação Cupido (2021)
- Shark Tank Brasil (Dragons' Den) (2022)
- Ultra Prêmio Show (2023–2025)
- Marjo Prêmios (2024)
- The Real Estate Brasil (2024)
- Palpite do Milhão (2024)

=== Sports Events ===
- UEFA Champions League
- UEFA Europa League (before, UEFA Cup)
- Primera División de México
- Premier League
- Serie A
- Copa Sudamericana
- Süper Lig
- Copa do Brasil
- Campeonato Paulista (A1 and A2)
- Campeonato Paulista Feminino
- Copa Paulista
- Copa São Paulo de Futebol Júnior
- Liga Nacional de Futsal
- NBA
- NBB
- Campeonato Paulista de Basquete
- Superliga Brasileira de Voleibol
- Circuito Brasileiro de Vôlei de Praia
- Rugby sevens
- Futebol de 7
- UFC
- Boxing
- XFC
- AFC
- ONE Fighting Championship
- Showbol
- Monster Energy NASCAR Cup Series
- Champ Car
- A1 GP
- Stock Series
- Copa Montana
- SuperBike Brasil Series
- Fórmula Truck
- NFL
- Liga Brasileira de Free Fire
- Free Fire World Series

=== News/Sports ===
- Aconteceu
- Agora com Lacombe
- A Hora do Kajuru
- Alerta Nacional
- Belas na Rede
- Bola Dividida
- Brasil TV!
- Data Venia
- Debate Brasil
- Denúncia Urgente
- Documento Verdade
- Elas em Jogo
- Galera Esporte Clube
- Hora de Ação
- Jornal da TV!
- Mariana Godoy Entrevista
- NASCAR Show
- NFL Show
- Notícias das 6/7
- Notícias de Minas
- Notícias do Brasil
- Notícias RJ (after, RJ Notícias)
- Olha a Hora
- Opinião no Ar
- Papo de Bola
- Qualé, Moré?
- RedeTV! E-Games
- RedeTV! Esporte
- RedeTV! Extreme Fighting
- RedeTV! Repórter
- Repórter Cidadão
- RTV!
- Se Liga Brasil
- Sem Rodeios
- Show Business
- Super Extremo
- Super Faixa do Esporte
- Tema Quente
- TV Economia
- TV Esporte
- TV Esporte Notícias
- UFC Sem Limites
- Vídeo Adrenalina
- Visão de Jogo

=== Variety ===
- A Casa é Sua
- Amaury Jr. Show
- Bom Dia Mulher
- Bom Dia Você
- Brothers
- Canal Aberto
- Desce pro Play!
- Edu Guedes e Você
- Encrenca
- Eu Vi na TV
- Fala Zuca
- Feira do Riso
- Foi Mau
- Funk Total
- Geral do Povo
- HERvolution
- João Kleber Show
- Luciana By Night
- Manhã do Ronnie
- Manhã Maior
- Melhor Pra Você
- Muito Show (before, Morning Show)
- Na Grelha com Netão
- Nestlé e Você
- Noite Afora
- Olga
- Pânico na TV
- Papo com Dani
- Programa Amaury Jr.
- Programa do Jacaré
- Sábado Total
- Tarde Quente
- Te Peguei
- Teste de Fidelidade
- Te Vi na TV
- Tricotando
- Você na TV
- Vou Te Contar

=== Kids ===
- A Fadinha do Brasil (2013)
- Galera na TV
- Miguelito (2000)
- TV Clubinho
- TV Kids
- Vila Maluca

=== Dramaturgy ===
- A Feiticeira
- Andromeda
- Barrados no Baile
- Betty. a Feia
- Desperate Housewives
- Friends
- Jeannie
- Pedro, O Escamoso
- Descendants of the Sun
- Love in Her Bag
- Star Trek
- W
- Zorro

=== Film ===
- Cine Total
- Sessão Especial
- TV Arte
- TV Escolha
- TV Magia
- TV Terror
