= Mulher-fruta =

Subculture of funk carioca

Mulher-fruta (Portuguese for 'fruit woman') is the name given to a funk carioca subculture that emerged in 2006 when Andressa Soares, at the time MC Créu's dancer, gained the nickname Mulher Melancia and brought, after that, a series of dancers named after fruits. The name of each fruit was related to a body part of each of the dancers.

The success later spread to other media, making the girls highlights of the Rio Carnival, appearing in covers of erotic magazines, brand ambassadors, reality show participants and even references to Rede Globo's telenovelas. In addition, they were cited by the Brazilian Academy of Letters in an article by columnist Moacyr Scliar.

== Fruitwomen ==
=== Mulher Melancia ===
Andressa Soares Azevedo (Rio de Janeiro, 28 March 1988), also known as Mulher Melancia (Miss Watermelon), was MC Créu's dancer between 2006 and 2008, being the first to receive such a name. The nickname was given by journalist Tino Júnior during an interview to Créu due to Andressa's large buttocks. Previously, between 2004 and 2005, she was a dancer at Gaiola das Popozudas. In 2009 she continued her career as a funk singer, creating hits such as "Solteira Sim, Sozinha Nunca" and "Velocidade 6", which was rerecorded by Cuban group Merengue after Andressa's original version having a success across the Americas.

She abandoned her career in 2016 and joined an importing company.

=== Mulher Jaca ===
Dayane Cristina Soares (Rio de Janeiro, 13 February 1985), also known as Mulher Jaca (Miss Jackfruit) or Dadá Cristina, was MC Créu's dancer between 2006 and 2009, being Mulher Melancia's daughter. The nickname was given due to her thick and toned thighs. Dayane did not have the same success as Andressa in the press and even said that, for being black, through racism in differing treatments, she was rarely called for television appearances and appointments for commercials, and that she felt rejected by the press. After a brief period as a singer between 2010 and 2014, she abandoned her artistic career and invested in her own brand of jeans, with which she gained R$1 million in profits in 2017. She married with Alvaro Gonzales, American descendant of Puerto Ricans in 2017 and moved to the United States.

=== Mulher Moranguinho ===
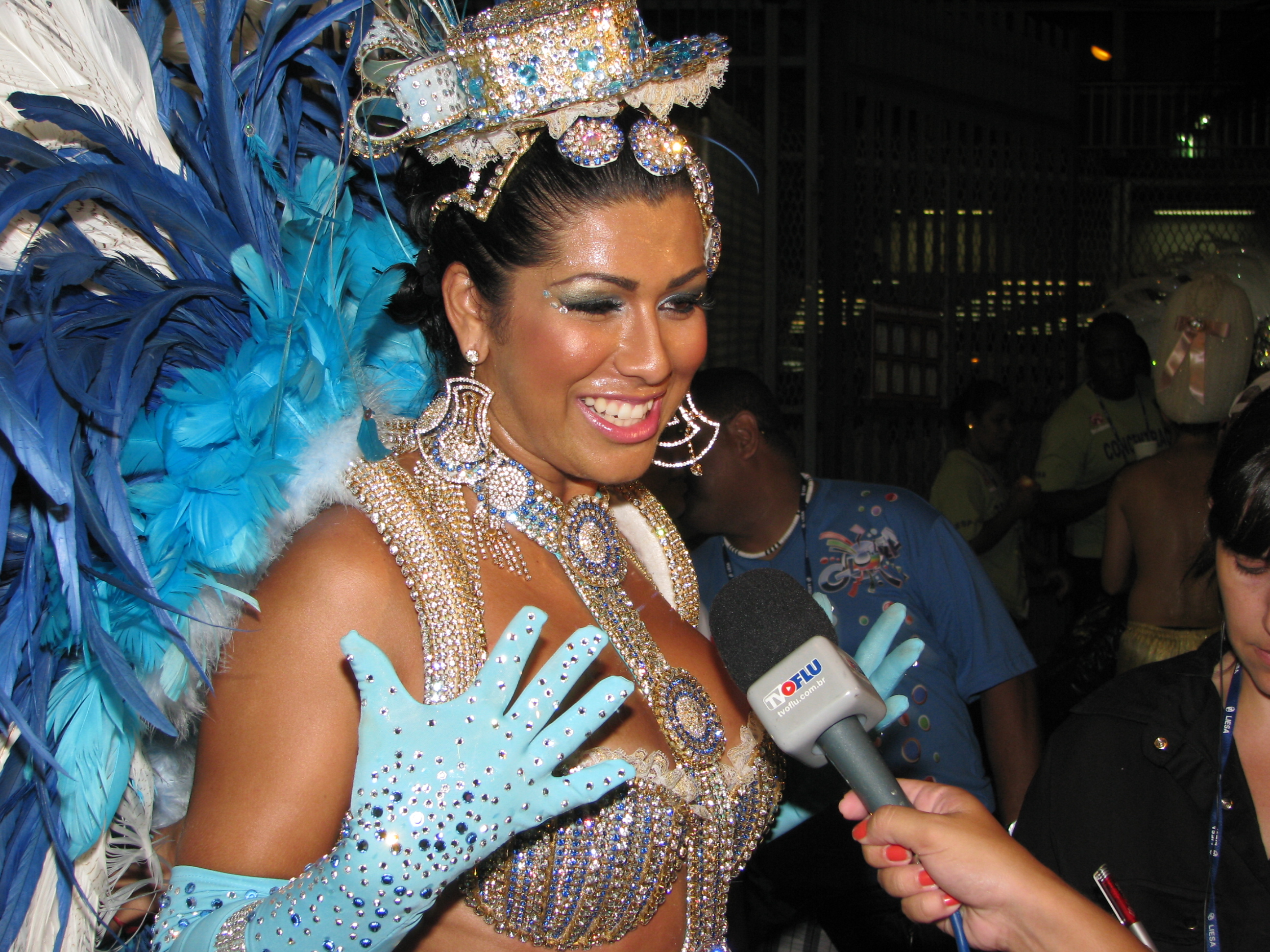
Mulher Moranguinho at the 2010 Carnival

Ellen Pereira Cardoso (São Paulo, 13 July 1981), also known as Mulher Moranguinho (Miss Strawberry), is a Brazilian dancer, model, influencer and former singer. She replaced Andressa Soares as MC Créu's dancer between March and November 2008. Previously, she was a dancer at Rede Record's Saturday afternoon show O Melhor do Brasil in 2007 and dancer of the group and pagode Swing Baratinha between 2004 and 2006. The name was given due to her pointy breasts.

She also had a brief career as a singer between 2009 and 2012, before abandoning her artistic side to marry with singer Naldo Benny in 2013. In December 2017, she denounced Naldo for aggression, allegedly committing acts of violence at her several times, but decided to remarry in 2018.

On 6 September 2022, she was confirmed to be one of the contestants of the fourteenth season of RecordTV's reality show A Fazenda. She was the twelfth to be eliminated in the competition, in a Roça (part of the set where the nominees for eviction appear) between André Marinho and Bia Miranda, ending in sixth place overall.

=== Mulher Melão ===
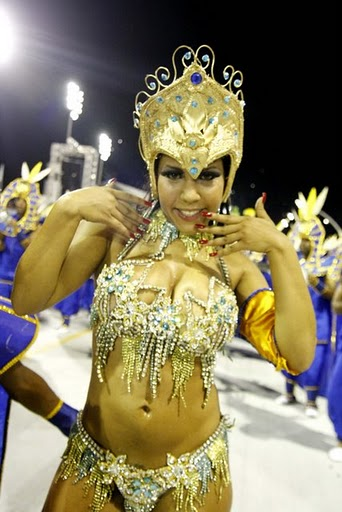
Mulher-Melão at the 2010 Carnival

Renata Frisson (Balneário Camboriú, 22 November 1984), best known for her stage name Mulher Melão (Miss Melon) was MC Frank's dancer between 2008 and 2009, before starting her career as a singer. The nickname was also given by Tino Júnior due to her full breasts. In 2010, she was a candidate for state deputy representing PHS in Rio de Janeiro, but was not elected. Her song "Você Quer?" became a hit in 2011 by being constantly used on Pânico na TV.

=== Mulher Maçã ===
Gracy Kelly (Rio de Janeiro, 5 April 1989), also known as Mulher Maçã (Miss Apple), rose to prominence as MC Leozinho's dancer between 2006 and 2008. She was previously a dancer for Movimento Funk Clube in 2004 and MC Serginho in 2005. Unlike the others, her stage name was given by herself, representing her round breasts. After the death of Steve Jobs in 2011, she was declared as the businessman's "widow" – founder of Apple, which uses an apple as a logo – and even said that she received psychic advice from him when she asleep. In 2014, she presented the reality show Na Intimidade, on erotic channel Sexy Hot. In 2015 she left her career and moved to Miami, in the United States. In 2017 she was thought to have been disappeared during Hurricane Irma, however, days later, she was revealed to be in a shelter.

=== Mulher Pêra ===
Suelen Aline Mendes Silva Cury (Guaratinguetá, 4 December 1986), also known as Mulher Pêra (Miss Pear), was the first fruit woman whose career did not start as a dancer. She already appeared as a singer and became famous every week taking part in the debates of RedeTV!'s Superpop. The nickname was adopted referencing her big hips and thin waist. In 2010 she was a candidate for state deputy in São Paulo, but only obtained 3,136 votes. Later, it was revealed that Suelen did not obtain a valid vote, as the received ones were nullified by TRE due to errors in the singer's registration. In 2012, she became a candidate again, this time for councilor of São Paulo, for PT do B and only received 2,126 votes. In 2013, she retired her Mulher Pêra character to present A Fadinha do Brasil, under a new guise, on RedeTV!. In 2014 she abandoned her artistic career by marrying Jamil Cury and becoming a jewelry entrepreneur.

=== Mulher Abacaxi ===
Marcela Porto, known as Mulher Abacaxi (Miss Pineapple), gained notoriety for taking part of Furacão 2000and for being the first transsexual woman obtaining the post of "madrinha de bateria" (drum godmother) of the Rio Carnival. Marcela subsequently ended her funk career and became the owner of a truck transporter and makes rare appearances on media.

=== Mulher Cereja ===
Fabiana Stella Braga, known as Mulher Cereja (Miss Cherry), replaced Mulher Moranguinho as MC Créu's dancer in 2009, however she quit her career in 2010 to become a makeup artist. She was the only fruit woman whose career did not start as a singer.

== Other derivations ==
=== Mulher Filé ===
Yani de Simone Pires da Silva (Rio de Janeiro, 21 February 1989), best known for her stage name Mulher Filé (Miss Beefsteak), became notorious as Mr. Catra's dancer between 2007 and 2008, where she got her nickname from her large buttocks. In 2009 she became a singer.

== Cultural impact ==
=== Television ===
- In 2010, together with Valesca Popozuda and Ângela Bismarchi, several fruit women made a Secret Santa exchange for Hoje em Dia.
- In 2013, Robertha Portella played dancer Dafne in Record's telenovela Dona Xepa, which presented herself under the artistic name Mulher Tutti-Frutti and had a rival named Mulher Broa, played by Jeniffer Setti.
- Still in 2013, Ellen Roche played Mulher Mangaba in Rede Globo's telenovela Sangue Bom, which had as rivals Mulher Pupunha, Mulher Saputá, Mulher Jambolão and Mulher Pau-de-Jacu, played by Dani Vieira, Vânia Love, Fernanda Abraão and Luiz André Alvim, respectively.
- The reality show A Fazenda had the participation of three fruit women: Andressa Soares (Mulher Melancia) in season 3 (2010), Yani de Simone, (Mulher Filé) in season 6 (2013) and Ellen Cardoso, (Mulher Moranguinho) in season 14 (2022).

=== Music ===
In September 2008, funk group Gaiola das Popozudas, led by Valesca Popozuda, launched the song "Fruta Tá na Feira" (The Fruit is in the Fair), in which she debauched and provoked the fruit women, citing Jaca, Melancia, Moranguinho e Melão.
