= Leo Dias =

Brazilian journalist (born 1975)

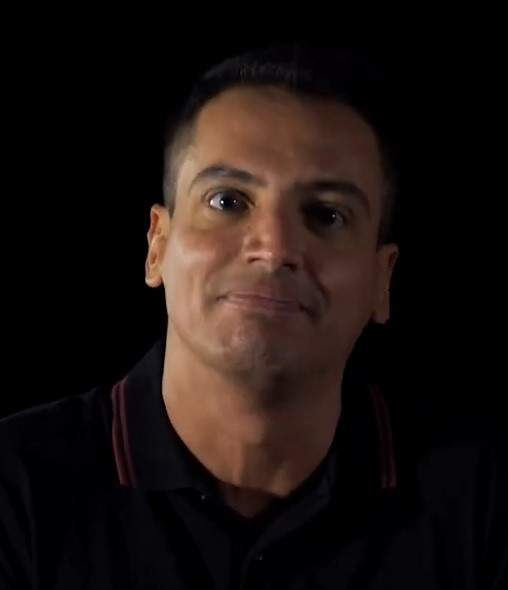
- Dias in 2019
- Born: Leonardo Antônio Lima Dias; May 7, 1975 (age 51); Rio de Janeiro, Brazil
- Education: Pontifical Catholic University of Rio de Janeiro
- Occupation: Journalist
- Years active: 1996–present
- Website: portalleodias.com

Leonardo Antônio Lima Dias (born May 7, 1975) is a Brazilian journalist. Known as the "Wizard of Gossip", he rose to prominence as one of the hosts of the celebrity gossip program Fofocalizando, broadcast by SBT, and as a columnist for the online newspaper Metrópoles. He currently serves as one of the hosts of the program Melhor da Tarde on Band. Additionally, he manages a celebrity news website, Portal Leo Dias, as well as a YouTube channel, LeoDias TV.

== Biography and career ==
Leonardo Antônio Lima Dias was born on May 7, 1975, in the city of Rio de Janeiro. He earned his degree in journalism from the Pontifical Catholic University of Rio de Janeiro in 1996, commencing his professional career at the newspaper Extra and at the magazines Contigo!, Amiga, and Chics e Famosos. Furthermore, he maintained a blog on the Yahoo web portal entitled Pronto, Falei! and served as an international correspondent for the Portuguese radio broadcaster RTP.

He worked as a reporter for the program Muito+, hosted by Adriane Galisteu, and was a daily columnist for the newspaper O Dia until 2019. Dias was nicknamed "Bomb Man" due to his explosive stories when he worked on Galisteu's program. In 2013, he became part of the reporting team for the program TV Fama on RedeTV!. The following year, telenovela writer Aguinaldo Silva created the character Téo Pereira from the telenovela Império, a role inspired by Dias.

In September 2016, Leo Dias departed from RedeTV! and joined SBT to host the program Fofocalizando. In 2019, he became a columnist for UOL, a position he held until 2020, when he transitioned to Metrópoles. He returned to RedeTV! in 2019 but left the network the following year, citing that his role had "lost its meaning". In 2023, Dias departed from Metrópoles, and in 2025 he officially left Fofocalizando. In February 2025, he launched the YouTube channel LeoDias TV.

Leo Dias has been openly homosexual since the age of sixteen and maintains relationships with non-openly gay men from the artistic milieu, whose names he cannot reveal. He also admits to having been a cocaine user since 2001, when he lived in Australia, and that he undergoes continuous treatment, although he experiences occasional relapses. He used ecstasy and cannabis during his adolescence but stopped because he no longer derived pleasure from them. He further revealed that he has suffered multiple overdoses and spent R$5,000 on psychoactive substances in a single night.

== Controversies ==
In January 2017, Leo Dias stated in his column for the newspaper O Dia that actress Danielle Winits had lied about a pregnancy in order to obtain priority boarding on a flight to New York. Upon her return, Danielle publicly criticized the journalist, and he responded with further accusations on social media. Singer Zezé Di Camargo called Leo Dias "crazy and a liar", while actor André Gonçalves, Danielle's husband, recorded a video threatening to break the journalist's teeth. Both parties filed police reports, and the case was later resolved, as announced by Dias on the program Fofocalizando.

Leo Dias and singer Anitta maintained a friendship for years but publicly broke ties in May 2020, when he reported that the artist's mother had left her home due to disapproving of her daughter's lifestyle. Anitta denied the information and accused the journalist of lying and threatening her. In response, Leo Dias released audio recordings in which the singer made negative comments about other celebrities and admitted to collaborating with his publications. He also revealed that the book Furacão Anitta, published in 2019, had been planned and proofread by the singer herself, contradicting the initial claim that it was an unauthorized biography. Both parties took the dispute to court.

In 2018, Leo Dias accused presenter Sonia Abrão of having "hijacked" a live interview with singer Gretchen that he himself was about to air on Fofocalizando, alleging dishonesty on his colleague's part. Sonia denied the accusations. Years later, in June 2022, Dias became involved in a far more serious controversy when he disclosed confidential information about actress Klara Castanho, who had placed a baby for adoption after being a victim of sexual violence. The exposure of the case generated strong national outcry and widespread criticism over the violation of the actress's privacy. Faced with the negative repercussions, Leo Dias publicly acknowledged his mistake and apologized.

In July 2025, Leo Dias publicly stated that the father of soccer player Neymar Jr. had allegedly paid R$80,000 to prevent the leak of a supposedly compromising video featuring the athlete. The statement quickly spread across social media and was contested by representatives of Neymar's family. Without presenting concrete evidence to support his claim, Dias found himself pressured by the negative backlash and, in a rare move, issued a public retraction in a video. He acknowledged having disseminated false information and formally apologized to the player and his family.

== See also ==
- Choquei, a Brazilian social media account focused on celebrity gossip
