= Social media newsroom =

A social media newsroom is a company resource, set up to increase the functionality and usability of the traditional online newsroom. Social media newsrooms (SMNs) are intended to encourage dialogue and information sharing. Unlike online newsrooms, content is accessible to more than just journalists, but to all those with whom the company engages such as bloggers, their prospects, customers, business partners and investors. It gives these stakeholders access to news, public relations announcements, images, audio, video and other multimedia files.

In addition to posting press releases and corporate news, companies can integrate other social content from sites such as YouTube, Flickr and Slideshow as well as streams from corporate Twitter accounts. Traditional tools for journalists such as corporate fast facts, leadership information, a multimedia library, financial information, awards and other recent media coverage are also included in an SMN.

Examples of companies effectively using social media newsrooms include Opel Group, Pressat, First Direct, MyNewsdesk, Scania and Newport Beach.

== See also ==
- Digital journalism
- Online newsroom
- Social media as a news source
- Social news website
