= Virato Social News =

German news aggregator

Virato
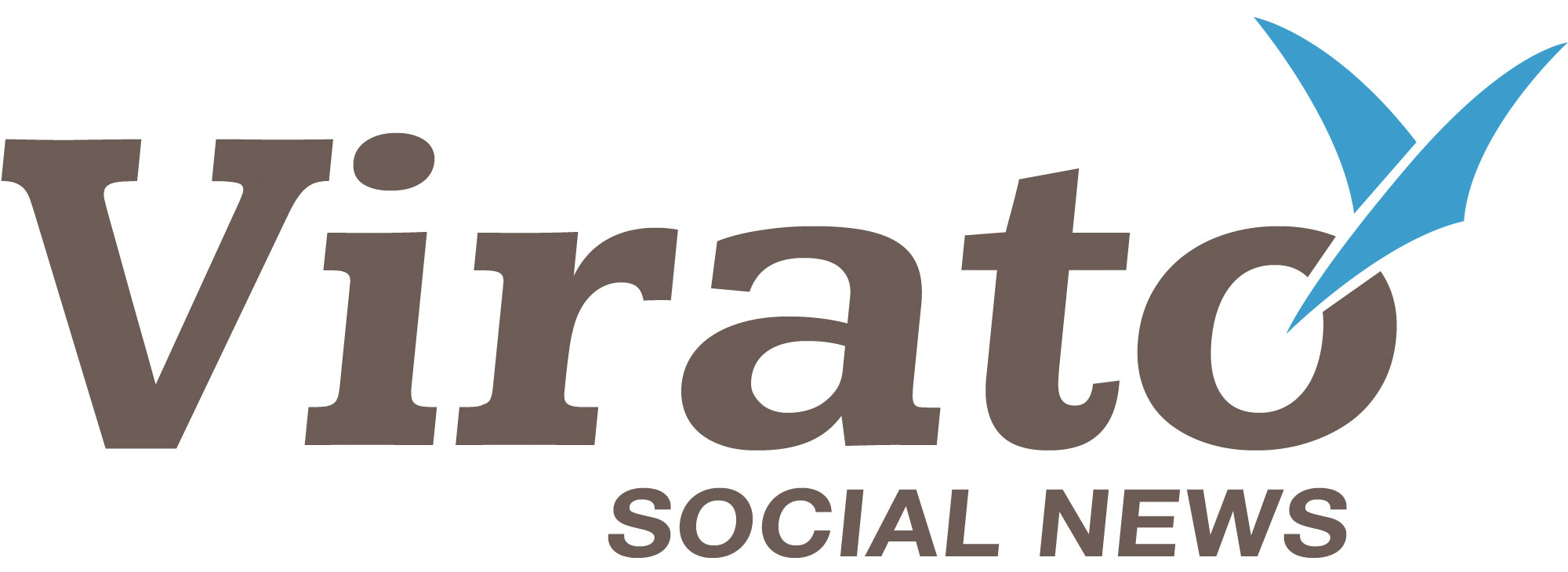
- Website type: social news, search engine, news aggregator
- Available in: German, English
- Owners: Bjoern Schumacher, dw capital GmbH (Cologne, Germany)
- Website: www.virato.de
- Commercial: Yes
- Registration: Public service without registration, personal area requires login
- Launched: 2011, re-launch in 2012

Virato was a search engine and aggregator for current news in Germany, which have achieved a high level of reach on the social web. The service bundles news from thousands of sources across the web (this includes blogs and webzines). All articles are weighted and scored based on their distribution across social networking platforms; which is how this service is categorized as a social news service. Additional services in this category include, but are not limited to, Reddit oder Digg.

== History ==
The name is an acronym for „Viral trends online“. Bjoern Schumacher introduced an alpha version of the site in 2011. Since its initial introduction, Virato acquired and re-launched by dw capital (CEO: Axel Schmiegelow, German Entrepreneur). The site's official re-launch was completed from May to June 2012. Virato has been a registered trademark (TM) in Europe since July 2012.

Virato does not seem to exist anymore. The website can't be reach, the last messages on the social media pages were posted in January 2014 (Twitter) resp. April 2014 (Facebook, as of September 30, 2015).

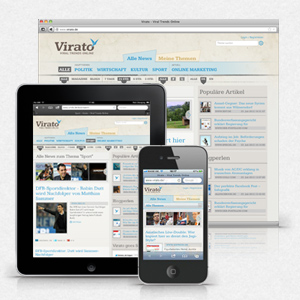
An example of a responsive website: Virato.de displayed on multiple devices

== Functions ==
Various functions of the website are made available to users based on whether or not they are logged into the website or not.

=== Public Access (without login) ===
The homepage displays all news which have a high „Social Score“; filters are available based on the medium (blogs, webzines), time frame (7 days, 24/6/3 hours), social networks (Facebook, Twitter) and language (German, English). Virato.de's main categories include: sport, politics, economy, and culture.

Each story teaser contains information about its social distribution, displays corresponding tweets from the Twitter community and the detail page of the article leads the user to the original online published source.

=== Personal Usage (with login) ===
Registration with the website can be completed via a user's Facebook or Twitter profile. After successfully registering with Virato.de, a user has access to additional features, which includes the ability to create their own online newspaper – topics for this newspaper are defined using story titles and tags users can also suggest additional sources for Virato.de.

== Social Score ==
Social news aggregators score online articles and entries for their information and/or entertainment value based on how often they have been liked, re-tweeted, and have a plus added in social media (such as on Facebook, Twitter and Google+). A source's relevance – based on the social score i.e. level of distribution in social media – is a determining factor in the placement of an article or entry in the social news’ stream.

== Technology/Project Realizatiom ==
Virato's back end system screens the social distribution of an article's link via a social media API repeatedly throughout the day. A corresponding algorithm then measures and sorts the article based on its social score. Virato.de has been implemented using responsive web design and is available across all devices.
