= Social news website =

Kind of web service

A social news website is a website that features user-posted stories. Such stories are ranked based on popularity, as voted on by other users of the site or by website administrators. Users typically comment online on the news posts and these comments may also be ranked in popularity. Since their emergence with the birth of Web 2.0, social news sites have been used to link many types of information, including news, humor, support, and discussion. All such websites allow the users to submit content and each site differs in how the content is moderated. On the Slashdot and Fark websites, administrators decide which articles are selected for the front page. On Reddit and Digg, the articles that get the most votes from the community of users will make it to the front page. Many social news websites also feature an online comment system, where users discuss the issues raised in an article. Some of these sites have also applied their voting system to the comments, so that the most popular comments are displayed first. Some social news websites also have a social networking service, in that users can set up a user profile and follow other users' online activity on the website.

Like many other Web 2.0 tools, social news websites use the collective intelligence of all of the users to operate. Social news websites also "impl[y] the technical, economic, legal, and human enhancement of a universally distributed intelligence that will unleash a positive dynamic of recognition and skills mobilization". Social news websites help participants to share a collective vision and awareness of how their actions are integrated with those of other individuals. Social news websites provide a new and innovative way to participate in a community that is constantly being flooded with new information. These social news websites "include opportunities for peer-to-peer learning, a changed attitude toward intellectual property, the diversification of cultural expression, the development of skills valued in the modern workplace, and a more empowered conception of citizenship". These websites can help to shape and reshape democratic opinions and perspectives.

Social news sites may mitigate the gatekeeping of mainstream news sources and allow the public to decide what counts as "news", which may facilitate a more participatory culture. Social news sites may also support democratic participation by allowing users from across geographic and national boundaries to access the same information, respond to fellow users' views and beliefs, and create a virtual sphere for users to contribute within.

== Websites ==
=== Active ===
==== Fark ====
Fark, which started in 1997, features news on any topic. On Fark, users can submit articles to the administrators of the site. Each day, these administrators pick out 50 articles to display on the front page.

==== Slashdot ====
Slashdot, started in 1997, was one of the first social news websites. It focuses mainly on science and technology-related news. Users can submit stories and the editors pick out the best stories each day for the front page. Users can then post comments on the stories. The influx of web traffic that resulted from Slashdot linking to external websites led to the effect being called the Slashdot effect.

==== Digg ====
Digg's online icon

Digg, started in December 2004, introduced the voting system. This system allows users to "digg" or "bury" articles. "Digging" is the equivalent of voting positively, so that popular articles are displayed first. "Burying" does not lower an article's score. However, if an article is buried enough times, it will be automatically deleted from the site. Digg offers a social networking service, as members can follow other members and build personal profiles with information about their interests.

==== Reddit ====
Reddit, started in June 2005, is a social news website where users can submit articles and comments and vote on these submissions. The submissions are organized into categories called "subreddits". Unlike Digg, with Reddit, users can directly affect an article's score. An "upvote" will increase the score and a "downvote" will decrease it. Articles with the highest scores are displayed on the front page. There is also a page for "controversial" articles, that have an almost equal number of upvotes and downvotes. Free speech debates have arisen due to the shutting down of obscene or potentially illegal "subreddits" (including /r/jailbait, a collection of sexually suggestive underage pictures.) Reddit introduced a system of user-created communities called "subreddits", which are essentially categories for a specific type of news. Comments on the featured posts are shown in a hierarchical fashion also based on votes. Users have the ability to earn "karma" for their participation and time on the website.

==== Hacker News ====
Hacker News, started in February 2007, is a social news site focusing on computer science and entrepreneurship, created by Paul Graham and run by his startup incubator, Y Combinator.

==== Lemmy ====
Lemmy, started in February 2019, is a federation of social news sites. The largest instance is Lemmy.World.

=== Defunct ===
==== Newsvine ====
Newsvine, started in March 2006, was a social news website mostly focused on politics, both international and domestic. The Newsvine home page allowed users to customize "seeds" and story feeds. Users received articles via "The Wire" from sources including The Associated Press or The Huffington Post, and from "The Vine" a stream of content from other Newsvine users. The "Top of the Vine" displayed the most voted and commented on articles of the day, week, month, or year. Additionally, Newsvine allowed members to create their own "Customizable Column", which could highlight a user's content posted, recent comments, and information about the specific Newsvine member.

==== feedalizr ====
feedalizr was a cross-platform, desktop social media aggregator built using Adobe Integrated Runtime that consolidates the updates from social media and social networking websites. Users can then use this application to update those sites from their desktop and view a consolidated stream of information.

==== Voat ====
Voat, launched in April 2014 and discontinued in December of 2020, was also a social news website and is very similar to Reddit visually and functionally. The site's userbase included a large number of alt right users, many of whom migrated to Voat after being banned on Reddit.

==== Prismatic ====
Prismatic combined machine learning, user experience design, and interaction design to create a new way to discover, consume, and share media. Prismatic software used social network aggregation and machine learning algorithms to filter the content that aligns with the interests of a specific user. Prismatic integrated with Facebook, Twitter, and Pocket to gather information about user's interests and suggest the most relevant stories to read.

==== Artifact ====
Artifact was an iOS and Android app that used machine learning to personalize news recommendations to readers, and also had social features such as liking articles, commenting, and reputation scores for users.

== See also ==
- Citizen journalism
- Digital journalism
- Fake news website
- Internet forum
- Journo-influencer
- Lemmy (software)
- Online newsroom
- Social bookmarking
- Social media newsroom
- Social media as a news source
- Usenet
