= TV Celinauta =

TV Celinauta (ZYB 404)
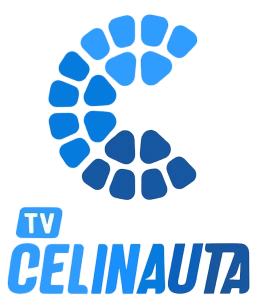
- Pato Branco, Paraná; Brazil
- Channels: Digital: 27 (UHF); Virtual: 7

Programming
- Affiliations: RedeTV!

Ownership
- Owner: Rede Celinauta de Comunicação; (Fundação Cultural Celinauta)
- Sister stations: Rádio Celinauta; Movimento FM

History
- First air date: June 18, 1987
- Former names: TV Sudoeste (1987-2025)
- Former channel number: Analog: 7 (VHF, 1987–2021)
- Former affiliations: Rede Manchete (1987-1999); TV Canção Nova (1999)

Technical information
- Licensing authority: ANATEL
- ERP: 2 kW
- Transmitter coordinates: 26°13′54.1″S 52°39′14.1″W

Links
- Public license information: Profile
- Website: www.celinauta.com.br

TV Celinauta (channel 7) is a RedeTV-affiliated television station based in Pato Branco, a city in the state of Paraná. The station is owned by Rede Celinauta de Comuniação, linked to the Order of Friars Minor of Pato Branco, and which also includes Rádio Celinauta and Movimento FM.

== History ==
In 1967, friar Policarpo Berri, of the Order of Friars Minor, idealist and pioneering religious leader in communications in Paraná, applies for a concession for a TV station, already having Rádio Celinauta AM, in the name of the Celinauta Cultural Foundation. Its transmitting tower was already being constructed in 1971.

The request took 12 years until 1979, when, already under the Military Government of João Figueiredo, the concession was definitively obtained.

The license started broadcasting on June 18, 1987 as a Rede Manchete affiliate. In addition to its relays of the network, it aired local programming, with emphasis on evangelization, as mmost of its initial local programs were produced by the church, such as Jornal da Igreja and Ao Clarão da TV, both of which presented by friar Nelson Rabelo. On June 23, 1987, it premiered its local news service, Sudoeste em Manchete, following the network's pattern.

In 1999, instead of following the transitional phase from Rede Manchete to RedeTV!, the station briefly became a TV Canção Nova affiliate. When RedeTV! began its regular service at the end of the year, it became a charter affiliate of the new network.

On August 11, 2025, the station was renamed TV Celinauta to avoid allusions to Globo affiliate TV Sudoeste.

== Technical information ==
Virtual channel	Digital channel	Screen	Content
7.1	27 UHF	1080i	TV Celinauta/RedeTV!'s main schedule

The station started digital, and, in turn, high definition broadcasts on UHF channel 27 on December 14, 2015. Its analog signal on VHF channel 7 shut down on February 27, 2021.
