= Choquei =

Brazilian Instagram and Twitter account

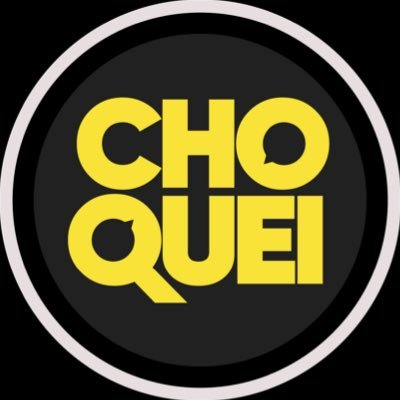
- Social media account logo
- Website type: Instagram and Twitter account
- Available in: Portuguese
- Creator: Raphael Sousa Oliveira
- Website: twitter.com/choquei; instagram.com/choquei
- Launched: November 2014; 12 years ago
- Current status: Online

Choquei (Note: Brazilian Portuguese pronunciation: [ʃoˈkej], lit. 'I'm shocked'.) is a social media account on Instagram and Twitter operated by Brazilian Raphael Sousa Oliveira (Note: Brazilian Portuguese pronunciation: [rafaˈɛw ˈsowzɐ oliˈvejɾɐ]) since 2014. Initially focused on entertainment news and gossip, the account became notorious for covering real-world news starting in 2022. In February of that year, it began reporting on the Russian invasion of Ukraine, but faced criticism for sharing unverified information and fake news. Later that year, it gained attention for its coverage of Brazilian politics during the presidential election, adopting an anti-Jair Bolsonaro and pro-Luiz Inácio Lula da Silva stance. The account received national attention in December 2023 after a young woman died by suicide due to fake news published by the page.

On April 15, 2026, Raphael was arrested by the Brazilian Federal Police in a major operation to dismantle a criminal organization that had laundered over R$1,600,000,000.

== History ==
Raphael Sousa Oliveira, born 1993 or 1994 in the Brazilian state of Goiás, holds degrees in photography and advertising but does not practice either profession. The son of a self-employed father and a civil servant mother, he created the Choquei account on Instagram and Twitter in November 2014 as a hobby. At the time, he was a salesperson for SIM cards, working with the Brazilian telecommunications company TIM, while still attending college. Working at a mobile phone company allowed him to constantly use his phone, enabling him to balance postings with SIM card sales. Initially, the account focused on reposting "cute images" of celebrities. As these images went viral and reach increased, Raphael began interacting with artists, promoting music videos, and covering events. He reports that Wesley Safadão, Simone & Simaria, and Carlinhos Maia "supported by sending messages of encouragement". Choquei became financially viable after reaching 100,000 followers, achieved months after creation. Early advertisers included local stores in Goiânia seeking to boost sales and gain followers, later attracting major brands like Ambev and Americanas. In 2020, Metrópoles columnist Leo Dias listed Choquei among "Brazil's biggest celebrity Instagram accounts".

Until January 2022, Choquei was managed by Banca Digital, the influencer marketing arm of Mynd8. (Note: However, Choquei still appeared on the company's client list as of July 2022.) Raphael chose not to renew the contract because all work would require Banca Digital's mediation. Previously, he had autonomy to independently negotiate VIP appearance fees and attend artists' DVD recordings. By February, the account's team included four content producers: a political science student, two advertising professionals, and a journalist. According to Raphael, during this period Choquei averaged 50 million weekly visits, with 16 million Instagram followers and over 1.4 million on Twitter. In October, the Instagram account reached 47 million users and generated 900 million impressions (number of times appearing in users' feeds).

By November 2022, Choquei employed six staff members who relocated to Goiânia to work on the account. The team operated in shifts – divided into three time blocks across two daily periods, totaling six blocks per day. Each employee covered one time block while Raphael coordinated operations alongside his boyfriend, who led the commercial department of their registered business. Compensation consisted of a fixed salary plus bonuses for high-performing posts. During this period, Raphael considered a Twitter post successful when it reached 10,000 likes, while on Instagram the benchmark was 100,000 likes. In 2023, Raphael planned to launch a news website.

== Content ==
Choquei specializes in entertainment and gossip news, becoming known for covering reality shows like Big Brother Brasil (BBB) and A Fazenda. The profile publishes news in short, urgent-style headlines in all-caps at the beginning of each post to define the subject such as "serious" and "urgent". An emoji of a siren (🚨) is an element used at the beginning of Choquei's posts to attract attention and convey a sense of urgency. Posts often use provocative language and black comedy, sparking intense debates. Choquei uses a photo or video, sometimes two in its posts to complement or reinforce the narrative and capture attention. In some instances, the images appear to be used to sensationalize the news, even when they have no direct connection to the reported event.

Its style consists of fast-paced information shared in a copy and paste manner, where almost all of the content published is based on reporting from other media outlets often without providing context, crediting sources or fact-checking. Choquei at times uses ambiguous language that amplifies minor aspects of a story while omitting full context. Phrases such as "maximum alert" are also employed to intensify the perceived seriousness of the news. Raphael states that fact-checking, a standard practice in journalism, takes time, and for this reason, the page prefers to repost content from "reliable outlets" as a way to maintain both speed and credibility. He also explained the challenges of incorporating verification methods, stating that posting content with a delay does not align with the page's operating model.

The posting frequency of the profile is irregular — in Raphael's words, "We don't have a quota. Some days we make 40, 50, 60 posts. Other days it doesn't reach 10. It depends daily on what's happening in the world, and there's no fixed routine either". However, Choquei has shifted its content focus multiple times; Raphael stated that "posting international or economic news started gaining traction, and loyal followers began praising it". These changes in content and posting style have led to accusations of fake news and sensationalism.

== Reception and impact ==
With a diverse audience of around 20 million followers across the two platforms as of November 2022, the "Choquei style" contributed to the profile's reach through the rapid dissemination of information drawn from other news outlets, viral tweets, and videos submitted by followers. In 2018, Choquei altered its coverage by announcing Jair Bolsonaro's victory in the 2018 presidential election, losing 10,000 followers in 13 minutes. On 10 June 2022, Choquei posted about a supposed ancient abandoned city in the Amazon, Ratanabá, which was actually a conspiracy theory spread by far-right groups. Without scientific foundation, the post was considered "a disservice to archeology" by experts. That week, the topic became one of the most discussed on social media, peaked in Google searches, and was mentioned by Mário Frias, former Culture Secretary under the Bolsonaro government. Following backlash, the page deleted the post and apologized. On November 2022, the profile reposted a news item from Folha de S.Paulo claiming that TV host Ratinho had criticized recent anti-democratic protests in a video. However, the video was actually from 2018, and the newspaper later updated the headline and added a correction note to the article a few days afterward. The video posted by Choquei's accounts, in turn, was deleted without explanation after being shared by thousands of users.

=== Russian invasion of Ukraine ===
Avatar of Agência Lupa

Agência Lupa
Twitter
@agencialupa

Portuguese: É falso que 'dezenas de milhares' de corpos estão nas ruas da capital da Ucrânia. Ainda não há dados oficiais sobre mortos; autoridades ucranianas afirmam que soldados de ambos os lados morreram. Siga o fio 🧵

It is false that "tens of thousands" of bodies are in the streets of the Ukrainian capital. There is still no official data on the number of deaths; Ukrainian authorities state that soldiers from both sides have died. Follow the thread 🧵

24 February 2022

Avatar of Choquei

Choquei
Twitter
@choquei

🚨 URGENTE: Dezenas de milhares de corpos mortos estão nas ruas da capital ucraniana. Muitos civis não estão conseguindo escapar

🚨 URGENT: Tens of thousands of dead bodies are in the streets of the Ukrainian capital. Many civilians are unable to escape

24 February 2022

The decision to begin covering the Russian invasion of Ukraine came from Choquei's content production team and was initially opposed by Raphael. "They went ahead with it despite what I said and published the news. The next day, when I woke up, Choquei was trending on Twitter", he later recalled. On 24 February 2022, the same minute it posted a video about Big Brother Brasil, Choquei began covering the war in Ukraine with a tweet reading: "President of Ukraine declares they will defend themselves if attacked by Russia". The abrupt shift in coverage went viral in Brazil and was widely reported. The account was among the first in Brazil to comment on the war. The term "Choquei" was trending on Twitter, and the profile removed "BBB" from its bio. Choquei published multiple series of posts about the war, making it a recurring topic alongside sporadic Big Brother Brasil updates. Other celebrity-focused accounts followed suit, sparking social media debates largely driven by Choquei. The profile cited headlines from Folha de S.Paulo and footage from CNN and Jornal da Globo, but also shared "hasty translations" and blunt phrases like "Explosions in Chernobyl".

While Instagram followers responded with "prayers [and] prophetic Bible quotes", Twitter users criticized the page for lacking sources, accusing it of "alarmist tone" and sensationalism. Multiple posts shared unverified claims absent from mainstream media or official sources. Some posts about the war, however, were displaying manipulated or decontextualized images. At least three posts were debunked as false: two by Agência Lupa and another by Aos Fatos. Raphael stated that starting 25 February, the page began citing sources and reduced posting frequency.

=== Politics of Brazil ===
The intention wasn't to elect A or B. Nor to help, I don't think I helped. The campaign we ran was to warn about the situation we were living in. What upset me the most was Jair Bolsonaro's handling of vaccines. I saw friends crying over family members who died. The message we wanted to convey, through political news, was to raise awareness about the facts on this issue.

— Raphael in November 2022.

Despite criticism for posting about the invasion of Ukraine, the content gained traction, and the public began demanding Choquei's stance on Brazilian politics. Raphael stated he had never been interested in politics, but under Bolsonaro's government, he took a position against the president, leading him to adopt a pro-Luiz Inácio Lula da Silva line. As a result, national politics and its developments became part of Choquei's coverage. All staff members stated that they voted for Lula, and Raphael himself describes as anti-Bolsonaro, particularly in response to what he considers the president's "disastrous" handling of the COVID-19 pandemic. Lula's wife, Janja, became a source for Raphael; the two grew closer in the first half of 2022, when they began messaging directly via Instagram.

On 17 July, Choquei posted a tweet encouraging Bolsonaro's opponents to register for tickets to his official reelection campaign launch event at Maracanãzinho in Rio de Janeiro. Within a week, the post reached 22,000 likes and 7,000 retweets. The goal was to leave the venue empty despite all tickets being claimed. After the digital campaign, Bolsonaro's Liberal Party canceled around 40,000 of the 50,000 registrations and called for an investigation into the case.

During the 2022 Brazilian presidential election, Choquei remained among the most impactful accounts on Twitter. On the day of the second round, 30 October, the work pace was intense; the page posted more than ten political contents per hour, including vote counting updates and actions by the Federal Highway Police (PRF). Fifty minutes before the Superior Electoral Court (TSE) announced the official result, Choquei published that Lula had won the election. The post about Lula's victory received 79,000 comments and 1.3 million likes on Instagram, while on Twitter, the same content obtained 286,000 likes, setting a page engagement record. On election day, Choquei gained 160,000 new Twitter followers and 60,000 more on Instagram. Janja invited Raphael to join the official sound truck on Paulista Avenue for Lula's victory speech, but he could not attend.

According to the case study "The coverage of the 2022 elections in entertainment and celebrity Twitter profiles" by Victor Paia and Raul Nunes, gossip news pages played a leading role in electoral debates. An analysis conducted during the period found that Choquei was the fifth most-mentioned profile in the discussion, behind only Lula, Jair Bolsonaro, André Janones, and Felipe Neto. Pedro Barciela, a specialist in social media monitoring and analysis, has noted that Choquei played a role in supporting the progressive field during the Brazilian elections by reaching a broad and diverse audience, including users who were not necessarily politically engaged. He gave an example and stated: "A user who might not typically participate in electoral debates, but who followed Choquei due to an interest in the reality show A Fazenda, for instance, was still exposed to news related to Lula".

Raphael says that the political coverage's clear pro-Lula bias did not affect revenue or deter potential advertisers: still in October, Raphael secured advertising contracts with brewer Spaten, personal care brand Dove, and fast-food chain McDonald's for Black Friday campaigns. On 1 November, Choquei announced it had sent a correspondent to Brasília to cover Bolsonaro's speech at the Palácio do Planalto. Raphael and his boyfriend attended Lula's inauguration on 1 January 2023.

=== Death of Jéssica Vitória Dias Canedo ===
In December 2023, Choquei spread fake news claiming Jéssica Vitória Dias Canedo was having an affair with Brazilian YouTuber Whindersson Nunes. Both denied the information; Jéssica's post was mocked by Choquei's owner Raphael, who joked about the message's length: "Tell her the Enem essay deadline has passed. For God's sake!" On 22 December, Jéssica's mother reported her daughter suffered from depression and committed suicide due to online harassment from Choquei's followers and other gossip pages. The following day, the page posted a statement on Twitter expressing regret but denying responsibility. The statement drew criticism from platform users:

[...] Regarding events circulating on social media associated with the tragic incident involving Jessica Vitória Canedo, we emphasize all publications were based on available information at the time and in strict compliance with routine activities exercising the right to information [...]

— Excerpts from the statement issued by Adélia Soares, the profile's lawyer, acknowledging the false affair story about Jessica and Whindersson Nunes.

Following backlash, lawyer Adélia Soares faced online harassment and had to publicly clarify she did not legally represent Choquei.

The Minister of Human Rights Silvio Almeida defended social media regulation, stating: "Tragedies like this involve mental health issues, undoubtedly, but also, and perhaps to a greater extent, political issues. Social media regulation becomes a civilizational imperative, without which we cannot speak of democracy or even dignity. The alternative is betting on chaos, death, and the monetization of suffering." The Minister for Women Cida Gonçalves stated that "It is unacceptable that the false content against Jéssica, which fueled a defamation campaign against the young woman, was neither removed by the page owner nor by platform X for nearly a week, even after appeals from Jéssica herself and her mother," advocating for holding the page accountable for spreading the false news. On 6 March 2024, the Civil Police of the State of Minas Gerais concluded its investigation, finding that Jéssica had created and disseminated content about the alleged relationship with comedian Whindersson Nunes.

== See also ==
- Social media as a news source

== Bibliography ==
- Roman, Luisa Monteiro (2023). O uso do sensacionalismo e entretenimento no jornalismo contemporâneo: um estudo do perfil da @Choquei no Twitter. TCC Jornalismo (Thesis) (in Brazilian Portuguese). Porto Alegre: Pontifical Catholic University of Rio Grande do Sul.
