= RedeTV! Belo Horizonte =

RedeTV! Belo Horizonte (ZYA 721)
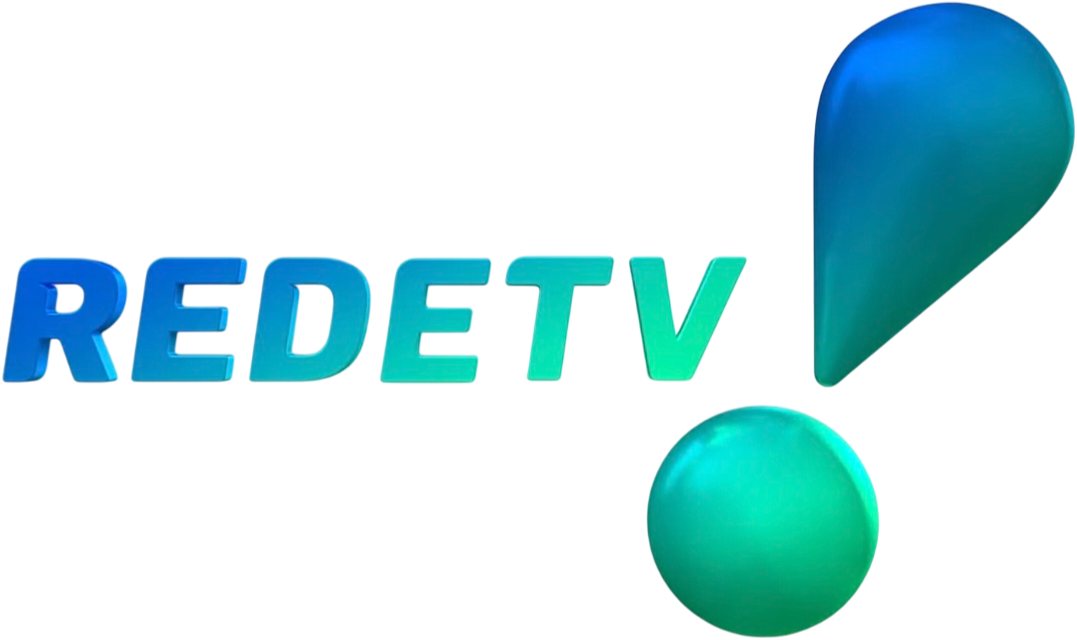
- Belo Horizonte; Brazil
- Channels: Digital: 29 (UHF); Virtual: 4
- Branding: RedeTV!

Programming
- Affiliations: RedeTV!

Ownership
- Owner: TV Ômega Ltda.

History
- First air date: June 5, 1983
- Former names: Rede Manchete Belo Horizonte (1983-1999); TV! Belo Horizonte (1999)
- Former channel numbers: Analog: 4 (VHF, 1983-2017)
- Former affiliations: Rede Manchete (1983-1999)

Technical information
- Licensing authority: ANATEL
- ERP: 4 kW
- Transmitter coordinates: 19°58′15.6″S 43°55′48.3″W

Links
- Public license information: Profile
- Website: redetv.uol.com.br

RedeTV! Belo Horizonte (channel 4) is a Rede TV!-owned-and-operated television station based Belo Horizonte. The station is headquartered at the Eduardo Nelo Xavier Ribeiro building, in the Savassi neighborhood, while its transmitting antenna is atop Serra do Curral, in the Belvedere neighborhood.

== History ==
The station started broadcasting on June 5, 1983, using the license formerly held by TV Itacolomi, which closed in July 1980. Its launch was simulcast with the stations in São Paulo and Rio de Janeiro, which opened on the same day. In 1987, the station started airing Minas em Manchete, as part of a push to strengthen local prorgamming between its five owned and operated stations. This, as well as the local edition of Manchete Esportiva and Gente de Opinião, were the only local programs seen during the Manchete phase.

In May 1999, all of the Rede Manchete stations were sold to Amílcare Dallevo, eventually becoming RedeTV!'s owned and operated stations by default.

== Technical information ==
Virtual channel	Digital channel	Screen	Content
4.1	25 UHF	1080i	Band RS/Band's main schedule

RedeTV! Belo Horizonte began its digital broadcasts on April 7, 2008, on UHF channel 25, becoming the first digital station in the market.

On May 23, 2010, the station started broadcasting in 3D, alongside the other RedeTV! owned and operated stations; the station deactivated its 3D signal on June 19, 2015.

Its analog signal was switched off at 11:59pm on November 22, 2017, according to the official ANATEL roadmap.
