= TV Cidade Dourada =

- Itaituba, Pará; Brazil
- Channels: Digital: 18; Virtual: 4
- Branding: RedeTV! Itaituba

Programming
- Affiliations: RedeTV!

Ownership
- Owner: Rádio e Televisão Cidade Dourada Ltda.; (Rádio e Televisão Cidade Dourada Ltda.)

History
- First air date: 1996
- Former channel numbers: Analog: 4 (VHF, 1996–2021)
- Former affiliations: Canal Brasileiro da Informação (1996 - 2004)

TV Cidade Dourada, also known as RedeTV! Itaituba, is a Brazilian television station, based in the municipality of Itaituba, in the state of Pará. The station was broadcast on physical channel 18.1 (virtual channel 4) and is affiliated to RedeTV!. The station has no license and is a Legal Amazon television retransmitting station (RTV).

== History ==
The station has been rented since at least 2005 to politician Fernando Soares. In 2006 it held Festival de Quadrilhas de Itaituba, which was known as Festival da Rádio Itaituba until the previous year. That same year it also started holding Verão Cidade Dourada.

In March 2010, Jean Galego left TV Eldorado and joined TV Cidade Dourada from April 3 due to scheduling conflicts between his former station and Rádio Liberal Itaituba.

On August 31, 2010, Rozza Paranatinga announced that he would leave TV Eldorado for TV Cidade Dourada's Jornal da Cidade after turning out a proposal for TV Amazônia in Santarém due to having businesses in Itaituba. Upon his death by a heart attack on September 14, 2011, two weeks before he was scheduled to narrate the coverage of a match between Brazil and Argentina in Belém, he was replaced by Jean Galego.

In July 2017, TV Cidade Dourada was sold to doctor Manoel Cordovil Diniz, who was set to take control from August 1. The station premiered Tá em Casa with Maria do Carmo on October 6, 2017.

The station announced in December 2021 that it would start broadcasting on digital television, on channel 4.1 (18).

== Controversies ==
=== 2011 presenter arson attack ===
At 1:30am on September 30, 2011, the house of Jornal da Cidade presenter Jean Galego was targeted by a gasoline attack. Suspicions emerged that in the two days before the incident, successive reports have been shown regarding the complaint against Mayor Ranilson Prado, of Aveiro, which created a feeling of dissatisfaction on the part of Ranilson's advisors.
