= The Bachelor (Brazilian TV series) =

- Genre: Reality television Drama
- Created by: Mike Fleiss
- Presented by: Fabio Arruda
- Country of origin: Brazil
- Original language: Portuguese
- No. of seasons: 1
- No. of episodes: 13

Production
- Running time: 60 minutes

Original release
- Network: RedeTV!
- Release: November 21, 2014 – February 20, 2015

Related
- The Bachelor (American)

The Bachelor, also known as The Bachelor: Em Busca do Grande Amor (English: The Bachelor: In Search of Great Love) was a Brazilian reality television series, based on the American television series of the same name, which premiered November 21, 2014 on RedeTV!. The show features 44-year-old Italian businessman, Gianluca Perino, courting 25 women.

The series concluded on February 20, 2015 in which 28-year-old gastronomy student Aane Doux was named the winner. However, the couple announced their break up four months after the show aired.

On July 31, 2017, Aane revealed that the entire show was a lie and she and Gianluca were never in a real relationship as he already had a girlfriend during the entire time of filming. She also announced that she was suing RedeTV! claiming that they had not fulfilled her contract, which provided that the winner of The Bachelor would be hired for a year to be a presenter or reporter for the network.

== Contestants ==
Biographical information according to RedeTV! official series site, plus footnoted additions.

Name	Age	Hometown	Occupation	Outcome	Place
Aane Doux	28	São José do Rio Preto	Gastronomy student	Winner	1
Syllvia Andrade	25	Cachoeiro de Itapemirim	Ring girl	Runner-up	2
Janaina Anicésio	26	Catanduva	Model	Week 12	3
Valentina Cavalcanti	23	São Manuel	Model	Week 11	4
Ana Paula Santana	24	Vitória	Lawyer	Week 10	5
Naiara Almeida	21	Balneário Camboriú	Businesswoman	Week 9	6
Paula Assunção	21	Foz do Iguaçu	Model	Week 9	7
Priscila Javarrotti	41	São Paulo	Event coordinator	Week 8	8
Katiely Kathissumi	28	Salvador	Nurse	Week 7	9
Ilka Ibrahim	29	São Paulo	Engineering student	Week 6	10
Gica Faresin	31	Novo Hamburgo	TV host	Week 5	11
Catarina Braga	23	Rio de Janeiro	Promoter	Week 4	12–13
Débora Soares	22	Serra	Flight attendant	Week 4	12–13
Mariane Tarrafel	19	Lins	Model	Week 3	14
Cris Lopes	28	Capão da Canoa	Actress	Week 2	15
Ana Clara Prado	21	Cabo Frio	Model	Week 1	16–25
Fernanda Vieira	33	São Paulo	Dentist	Week 1	16–25
Juliana Maia	22	Florianópolis	Model	Week 1	16–25
Julieta Del Villar	27	Buenos Aires, Argentina	Public relations	Week 1	16–25
Karoline Schwonke	19	Pelotas	Model	Week 1	16–25
Letícia Mello	20	São Bernardo do Campo	Public relations student	Week 1	16–25
Michelle Mignon	26	Uberaba	Model	Week 1	16–25
Nanny Correa	30	Bom Despacho	DJ	Week 1	16–25
Suzy Pianista	33	São Paulo	Pianist	Week 1	16–25
Viviane Pereira	27	Jaraguá do Sul	Real estate agent	Week 1	16–25

== Call-out order ==
Gianluca's call-out order
Order	Bachelorettes	Episode / Week												
Order	Bachelorettes	101	102	103	104	105	106	107	108	109	110	111	112	113
Order	Bachelorettes	1	2	3	4	5	6	7	8	9	10	11	12	13
1	Ana P.	Mariane	Aane	Syllvia	Paula	Ilka	Syllvia	Valentina	Janaina	Ana P.	Syllvia	Aane	Syllvia	Aane
2	Fernanda	Catarina	Catarina	Katiely	Janaina	Syllvia	Valentina	Ana P.	Paula	Valentina	Valentina	Janaina	Aane	Syllvia
3	Janaina	Gica	Naiara	Priscila	Valentina	Ana P.	Janaina	Syllvia	Syllvia	Janaina	Janaina	Syllvia	Janaina	
4	Débora	Valentina	Paula	Paula	Ana P.	Valentina	Ana P.	Priscila	Valentina	Aane	Aane	Valentina		
5	Ilka	Ana P.	Gica	Ilka	Katiely	Katiely	Naiara	Paula	Ana P.	Syllvia	Ana P.			
6	Nanny	Naiara	Mariane	Débora	Ilka	Naiara	Katiely	Aane	Aane	Naiara				
7	Mariane	Paula	Valentina	Valentina	Aane	Janaina	Paula	Naiara	Naiara	Paula				
8	Ana C.	Débora	Katiely	Janaina	Syllvia	Priscila	Aane	Janaina	Priscila					
9	Suzy	Cris	Ilka	Naiara	Priscila	Aane	Priscila	Katiely						
10	Syllvia	Katiely	Janaina	Catarina	Gica	Paula	Ilka							
11	Juliana	Priscila	Priscila	Ana P.	Naiara	Gica								
12	Cris	Syllvia	Débora	Aane	Catarina									
13	Julieta	Janaina	Ana P.	Gica	Débora									
14	Paula	Aane	Syllvia	Mariane										
15	Catarina	Ilka	Cris											
16	Gica	Ana C.												
17	Valentina	Fernanda												
18	Aane	Juliana												
19	Priscila	Julieta												
20	Viviane	Letícia												
21	Katiely	Karoline												
22	Michelle	Michelle												
23	Naiara	Nanny												
24	Karoline	Suzy												
25	Letícia	Viviane												

Key

Winner
Date
Eliminated
Eliminated outside the rose ceremony

== Ratings and reception ==
=== Brazilian ratings ===
All numbers are in points and provided by Kantar Ibope Media.

Episode	Air date	Timeslot (BRT)	SP viewers (in points)	Rank timeslot	Source
1	November 21, 2014	Friday 11:30 p.m.	1.7	5	
2	November 28, 2014	Friday 11:30 p.m.	1.7	5	
3	December 5, 2014	Friday 11:30 p.m.	0.9	5	
4	December 12, 2014	Friday 11:30 p.m.	1.5	5	
5	December 19, 2014	Friday 11:30 p.m.	1.4	5	
6	December 26, 2014	Friday 11:30 p.m.	0.4	6	—N/a
7	January 2, 2015	Friday 11:30 p.m.	0.7	5	
8	January 9, 2015	Friday 11:30 p.m.	0.8	5	
9	January 16, 2015	Friday 11:30 p.m.	1.1	5	
10	January 23, 2015	Friday 11:30 p.m.	1.2	5	—N/a
11	January 30, 2015	Friday 11:30 p.m.	1.0	5	
12	February 6, 2015	Friday 11:30 p.m.	0.7	5	
Recap	February 13, 2015	Friday 11:30 p.m.	1.0	5	
13	February 20, 2015	Friday 11:30 p.m.	1.0	5	

- In 2014, each point represents 65.000 households in São Paulo.
- In 2015, each point represents 67.000 households in São Paulo.

== See also ==
- List of programs broadcast by RedeTV!
