= A Fadinha do Brasil =

2013 Brazilian TV children's show

- Genre: Children's show
- Directed by: Paulo Trevisan
- Presented by: Mulher Pera
- Country of origin: Brazil
- Original language: Portuguese
- No. of seasons: 1
- No. of episodes: 3

Original release
- Network: RedeTV!
- Release: 1 September – 15 September 2013

A Fadinha do Brasil (literally "The Little Fairy of Brazil") was a Brazilian children's show presented by former fruitwoman Suelem Aline Mendes da Silva, better known under her alias Mulher Pera or Suéllem Cury. The program aired three consecutive Sundays (1, 8 and 15 September) as a time-brokered program on RedeTV! and was criticized for its poor quality. It was produced by a child talent agency.

== Background ==
Suéllem had previously taken part on RedeTV!'s long-running debate program Superpop a few years before, in 2008. After a failed career as a candidate for federal deputee in São Paulo, which attained only 3,000 votes, she announced the start of a new career as a children's entertainer, motivated by her childhood obsession with Xuxa, but centered on ecology and sustainability.

== Format ==
The first edition shown on 1 September featured Fadinha in a green screen background of a cartoon forest, surrounded by children who were visibly unattracted by the program. Also included were Fadinha's side characters, Robotron (a robot from the future) and fat funkers Tico e Teca. The songs were poorly-dubbed; overall the entire program caused a storm of criticism on social media. The second edition on September 8 was recorded in a physical stage, still with limited reception from the audience. According to Suéllem, the format started off hard, but she did not take the criticism.

The third and final edition, on 15 September, was a series of highlights from the two previous editions, including the full interview to Gilberto Natalini, which aired incomplete in the previous week.

== Cancellation ==
Ahead of what would have been the fourth edition, the producers of the program decided to cancel Suéllem's timebroker agreement with RedeTV! on 20 September after harsh criticism from social media users. The timeslot was given to another broker.

Suéllem by 2014 was reported to have left her artist career in 2014, by marrying with Jamil Cury and starting a new phase as a jewelry entrepreneur; in September 2025, she appeared as part of a leaked list of contestants for the seventeenth edition of A Fazenda, a reality show on the Record network.
