= RedeTV! Rio de Janeiro =

RedeTV! Rio de Janeiro (ZYP 124)
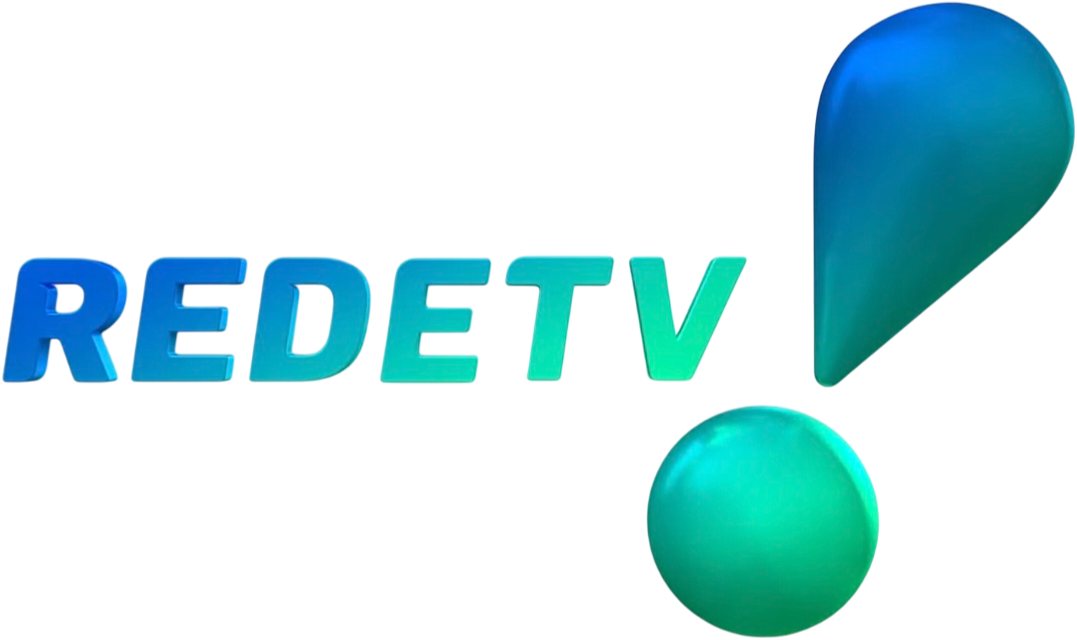
- Rio de Janeiro; Brazil
- Channels: Digital: 21 (UHF); Virtual: 9
- Branding: RedeTV!

Programming
- Affiliations: RedeTV!

Ownership
- Owner: TV Ômega Ltda.

History
- First air date: June 5, 1983
- Former call signs: ZYB 519
- Former names: Rede Manchete Rio de Janeiro (1983-1999); TV! Rio de Janeiro (1999)
- Former channel numbers: Analog: 6 (VHF, 1983-2017)
- Former affiliations: Rede Manchete (1983-1999)

Technical information
- Licensing authority: ANATEL
- ERP: 4 kW
- Transmitter coordinates: 22°57′5″S 43°14′8.4″W

Links
- Public license information: Profile
- Website: redetv.uol.com.br

RedeTV! Rio de Janeiro (channel 6) is a RedeTV!-owned-and-operated television station based in Rio de Janeiro. When it was a Rede Manchete O&O, it was its flagship station, though under the current network, it's a mere branch.

== History ==
The VHF channel frequency was previously occupied by TV Tupi Rio de Janeiro from January 20, 1951, to July 18, 1980, when it became the last Rede Tupi O&O out of the seven to close per DENTEL orders. The licenses of the seven Tupi stations, as well as TV Excelsior's station in São Paulo, were partitioned between Bloch and Silvio Santos, with Bloch winning the channel 6 license in 1981.

The station launched on June 5, 1983, at 7pm, with O Mundo Mágico, which was simulcast to the two other stations in São Paulo and Belo Horizonte, which started broadcasting on the same day. Throughout its nearly 16-year long operation, it served as the network's flagship. Local news did not start until 1987, per a network recommendation to strengthen local programming on its five O&Os. For this reason, the station started carrying Rio em Manchete.

In May 1999, the five Manchete stations were sold to Amílcare Dallevo, eventually creating the current RedeTV! network six months later. In October, ahead of the total relaunch of the network, the station set up new headquarters by renting an entire floor at the network's teleport facilities located in Cidade Nova. From there, the necessary infrastructure to operate in the city was built, including a 150 m^{2} studio to produce the national RTV! newscast. RTV! was produced locally, then sent to São Paulo and shown on the network. This arrangement didn't last long, and by March 2000, all production was centralized from São Paulo. RedeTV! also inherited Manchete's statewide retransmitter network, which was still used to generate the national satellite feed.

== Technical information ==
Virtual channel	Digital channel	Screen	Content
6.1	21 UHF	1080i	RedeTV! Rio/RedeTV!'s main schedule

RedeTV! São Paulo started its digital signal on virtual UHF channel 21, on April 9, 2008, alongside RedeTV! Belo Horizonte. In both cases, it was the first locally originated digital television station.

On May 23, 2010, it used subchannel 6.2 to activate its 3D signal alongside the four other O&Os of the network. The station deactivated its 3D signal on June 19, 2015.

The station's analog signal was switched off at 11:59pm on November 22, 2017.
