= TV Canção Nova =

Brazilian Catholic television network

- Country: Brazil
- Broadcast area: Brazil
- Headquarters: Cachoeira Paulista, SP

Programming
- Picture format: 1080i HDTV

Ownership
- Owner: Comunidade Canção Nova

History
- Launched: 8 December 1989

Links
- Website: tv.cancaonova.com

TV Canção Nova is a Brazilian Catholic television network owned by the Canção Nova community.

== History ==
TV Canção Nova started broadcasting on December 8, 1989 at 10am, with the broadcast of a mass, limited to the municipalities of Cachoeira Paulista and Lorena, in the Paraíba Valley region. From that, TVCN was officially inaugurated. The station, with its limited coverage, was an affiliate of the former TVE Brasil, while only having the ability of producing two hours of its own proudctions per day, generated locally. Over time, its national expansion began by selling airtime on Redevida and Rede Mulher (the latter of which was later acquired by Edir Macedo and is now Record News) as an independent production company). In 1997, it started national satellite broadcasts, 24 hours a day. This was possible due to the acquisition of TV Jornal in Aracaju, Sergipe,

On September 13, 2003, TV Canção Nova and its sister radio outlet received a Guinness World Records certificate for their non-commercial Catholic programming. As of 2007 it had consolidated itself as the largest Catholic television network in Brazil, and, in 2008, has a potential audience of 55 million viewers.

In April 2013, TV Canção Nova began a fundraising campaign to collect funds to upgrade its equipment to digital. On April 22, 2015, the network announced the closure of its Rio de Janeiro news unit in order to cut costs.

== See also ==
- Catholic television
- Television in Brazil
