= TV Metrópole =

TV Metrópole (ZYA 439)
- Caucaia, Ceará; Brazil
- Channels: Digital: 16.1(UHF); Virtual: 26
- Branding: TV Metrópole

Programming
- Affiliations: Canal Educação

Ownership
- Owner: Fundação José Possidônio Peixoto

History
- Founded: 2011
- First air date: October 31, 2011

Links
- Website: tvmetropolecanal16.com.br

TV Metrópole is a Brazilian television station headquartered in Caucaia, city in the state of Ceará. It operates on UHF channel 16 and is an affiliate of Canal Educação. It is owned by Fundação José Possidônio Peixoto, educational entity dedicated to social acts, who also controls radio stations Líder Gospel FM and Viva FM. Its signal covers the metropolitan area of Fortaleza and adjacent municipalities. In its early years, its programming consisted of cultural and educational productions, later starting to produce more mainstream programming.

== History ==
On September 22, 2011, TV Metrópole launched an experimental signal on UHF channel 22, airing a few local productions for parts of the day and operating with a transmitter at 50% capacity. The channel was formally launched on October 31. In this period, its schedule was predominantly made up of cultural and educational programming, as well as airing foreign movies and TV series.
