= Tino Júnior =

Brazilian television and radio presenter

- Born: Celestino de Azevedo Vivas Júnior; July 30, 1975 (age 51); Rio de Janeiro, Brazil
- Occupations: Television and radio presenter
- Height: 1.80 m (5 ft 11 in)
- Children: 2

Celestino de Azevedo Vivas Júnior, better known as Tino Júnior (born July 30, 1975), is a Brazilian television and radio presenter.

== Career ==
He worked at FM O Dia, during the mid-2000s, until he was hired to work at Sistema Globo de Rádio, first at Beat98 since 2008 and later, since 2009 at Rádio Globo presenting the program Vale-Tudo na Globo, which replaced Quintal da Globo, at night and, years later, it became in the afternoon. Some of his characteristic marks are his strong Rio accent and his catchphrase “Que isso, fera!” (“What this, beast!”, in Portuguese). He was responsible for naming two of the Fruit Women, Andressa Soares, the Watermelon Woman and Renata Frisson, the Melon Woman.

On May 15, 2014, Tino receives a new challenge of presenting the humorous program Alegria ao Meio-Dia (Joy at Noon), from 12pm to 2pm, together with Tropa do Riso, composed of Maurício Menezes, Helio Junior and Sergio Ricardo. Vale-Tudo gives way to David da Tarde (David of the Afternoon), presented by David Rangel, from 2pm to 5pm.

After six years, Tino leaves Sistema Globo de Rádio definitively. The Alegria program is now commanded by Mário Esteves and also Beat98, as he was hired by Record to present the news program RJ no Ar. In January 2018, he temporarily presented the program Hoje em Dia, during César Filho's vacation.

In June 2018, he returned to the radio FM O Dia presenting the new program Que Isso, Fera! in the morning and remains on Record with Balanço Geral RJ in the afternoon. Tino left FM O Dia in 2021, remaining only on television.

== Personal life ==
Tino was married to the public servant Gabriela Vivas, with whom he had a son, named Miguel. They separated in June 2024, when Vivas was pregnant with Maria, the couple's second daughter, who was born in December of the same year.

== Works ==
=== Radio ===
- Na Madruga - FM O Dia
- Que Isso, Fera! - FM O Dia
- Show do Tino - Beat98
- Beat98 Saturday programming - Beat98
- Bate Boca - Beat98 (only Saturdays)
- Vale Tudo - Rádio Globo
- Alegria ao Meio Dia - Rádio Globo

=== Television ===
- RJ no Ar - Record Rio
- Balanço Geral Manhã - Record
- SP no Ar - Record São Paulo
- Balanço Geral RJ - Record Rio
- Hoje em Dia - Record
- Official standard voice of promos - Record Rio

== Awards and nominations ==
Year	Award	Category	Result	Ref.
2023	Melhores do Ano NaTelinha	Best Local Presenter	Won	
2024	Melhores do Ano NaTelinha	Best Local Presenter	Nominated	
