= Online newsroom =

An online newsroom (also known as a pressroom, mediaroom, press center or media center) is a website, web page or site section that contains distributable information about a corporation or organization. The online newsroom was initially created for corporate communicators and public relations firms to target traditional media outlets, fundamentally newspapers, magazines, radio stations and television stations. Multiple public relations audience interests are now supported, including media relations, investor and analyst relations, community relations, and consumer social media relations.

Most online newsrooms provide press releases and kits, photographs, logos, audio, video, executive biographies, contact information, events, company history and awards and honors. Sometimes, they also contain industry news feeds.

Increasingly companies are aggregating their presence on various social media sites into their online newsrooms. Some newsrooms may accommodate interactive forums for product evangelists, disgruntled consumers and organizational spokespeople to engage in ongoing online conversation about the company or organization and its products, services or philosophy.

The first known online newsroom was developed in 1995 by the American Institute of Physics for the Acoustical Society of America. Since this time, other companies have either developed or partnered with technical companies to offer standalone, branded online newsroom solutions. Additionally, some companies offer an online newsroom component as a component of a larger software package that integrates the online newsroom with a media contact database and media monitoring services.

== See also ==
- Video news release
