= Social media as a news source =

Trend in Internet browsing

"News at your fingertips" Social media is where the world stays connected.

Social media as a news source is defined as the use of online social media platforms such as Instagram, TikTok, and Facebook rather than the use of traditional media platforms like the newspaper or live TV to obtain news. Television had just begun to turn a nation of people who once listened to media content into watchers of media content between the 1950s and the 1980s when the popularity of social media had also begun creating a nation of media content creators. Almost half of Americans use social media as a news source, according to the Pew Research Center. Social media has changed the way individuals access news in real time and on personal interest. As social media's role in news consumption grows, questions have emerged about its impact on knowledge, the formation of echo chambers, and the effectiveness of fact-checking efforts in combating misinformation. News reporting had to be a specialized field, reporters had to be writers and researchers to discover accurate information for it to be released to the public. Reporting is no longer just for a professional journalist, even someone who happens to be walking nearby can become the reporter.Many newspaper and live TV companies tried to get people to sign up for their online news subscription with a monthly or yearly fee. Consumers were not interested in purchasing these subscriptions due to social media platforms.In Joshua Benton's questioner it showed that 71% would not be interested in any of these options.

Social media platforms allow user-generated content and sharing content within one's own virtual network. Using social media as a news source allows users to engage with news in a variety of ways including:

- Consuming and discovering news
- Sharing or reposting news
- Posting one's own photos, videos, or reports of news (i.e., engage in citizen or participatory journalism)
- Commenting on news posts

In 2019, the Pew Research Center created a poll that reported Americans are wary about the ways that social media sites share news and certain content. This wariness of accuracy grew as awareness that social media sites could be exploited by bad actors who concoct false narratives and fake news.

== Relationship to traditional news sources ==
Unlike traditional news platforms such as newspapers and news shows, social media platforms allow people without professional journalistic backgrounds to create news and cover events that news agencies might not cover. Social media users may read a set of news that differs slightly from what newspaper editors prioritize in the print press. A 2019 study found that Facebook and Twitter users are more likely to share politics, public affairs, and visual media news. Typically social media users circulate more towards posting about negative news. A study of tweets found that while optimistic-sounding and neutral-sounding tweets were equally likely to express certainty or uncertainty, the pessimistic tweets were nearly twice as likely to appear certain of an outcome than uncertain. These results could imply that posts of a more pessimistic nature that are also written with an air of certainty are more likely to be shared or otherwise permeate groups on Twitter. A similar bias towards negativity has developed on Facebook, where internal memos revealed that an algorithm built to promote "meaningful social interaction" actually incentivized publishers to promote negative and sensational news. Biases towards negativity need to be considered when the utility of new media is addressed, as the potential for human opinion to overemphasize any particular news story is greater despite general improvement.

In order to compete in this rapidly changing technological environment, there has been an upheaval of traditional news sources onto online spaces. The production and circulation of newspaper prints have continued to globally decline in accordance with the increasing presence of news outlets on social media. Prominent platforms such as Twitter and Facebook have been key in engaging users through the integration of journalistic news into their newsfeeds. This feature has now become a foundational part of these apps' interfaces.

Social media incentivizes both legacy news brands and individual professional journalists to share their reporting and interact with audiences on social platforms to boost engagement. However, most people who consume news on social media report that accessing news is not their main motivation for being on social media, but rather, they see and consume news incidentally. Nonetheless, informational interviews reveal that these consumers rely on being informed through social media. Some news consumers attest that a news brand's participation in social media does not improve their trust in the brand and that more in-depth reporting and more transparency about biases would improve trust instead.

== Use as a news source ==
Globally, data from 2020 shows that over 70% of adult participants from Kenya, South Africa, Chile, Bulgaria, Greece, and Argentina utilized social media for news while those from France, the UK, the Netherlands, Germany, and Japan were reportedly less than 40 percent.

According to the Pew Research Center, 20% of adults in the United States in 2018 said they get their news from social media "often," compared to 16% who said they often get news from print newspapers, 26% who often get it from the radio, 33% who often get it from news websites, and 49% who often get it from TV. The same survey found that social media was the most popular way for American adults age 18–29 to get news, the second-to-last most popular way for Americans age 20–49 to get news, and the least popular way for American adults age 50-64 and 65+ to get the news.

In 2019, the Pew Research Center found that over half of Americans (54%) either got their news "sometimes" or "often" from social media, and Facebook was the most popular social media site where American adults got their news. More recent findings from The Pew Research in October 2026, found that digital sources have become an important part of how adults get news. The research results showed that more than half of U.S. adults (59%) is up from the 2019 research findings. However, at least 50% off all respondents reported that the following were either a "very big problem" or a "moderately big problem" for getting news on social media:

- One-sided news (83%)
- Inaccurate news (81%)
- Censorship of the news (69%)
- Uncivil discussions about the news (69%)
- Harassment of journalists (57%)
- News organizations or personalities being banned (53%)
- Violent or disturbing news images or videos (51%)

In a later survey from the same year, the Pew Research Center reported that 18% of American adults reported that the most common way they get news about politics and the election was from social media.

Use of Social Media Platforms (In General and as News Sources) by American Adults in 2019
Social media platform	Percent who use platform	Percent who get news or news headlines on platform
Facebook	71%	52%
YouTube	74%	28%
Twitter	23%	17%
Instagram	38%	14%
LinkedIn	27%	8%
Reddit	13%	8%
Snapchat	23%	6%
WhatsApp	18%	4%
Tumblr	4%	1%
Twitch	5%	1%
TikTok	3%	0%

Additional source information shows that from politics and the United States presidential election in 2016, the popularity of fake news had grown to global attention. With this information, the study explains that more than 60 percent of adults receive their news from social media, the most popular being Facebook. With the increase of fake news, and the large amount of adult participation on these social media sites, it made it much harder for those who were searching for news to find a source that they could find credible.

Another study found that adult participants found their own friends on Facebook to be a more reliable source of information online compared to a professional news organization. Although, when news was posted by a news organization online, they were then found more reliable compared to when they are shared by their online friends. Showing that adult participants found that the news that was only posted on Facebook and social media was much more credible to them than compared to other forms of information spreading. The study further states that these outcomes have the potential explanation that the topic of the news article played a part in the ways they were affected. This could have affected the way adult participants interacted with the different news sources, such as their online friends compared to a news organization, prominently because depending on the story, they want to have the correct information about the news from the most credible source.

=== By young people ===
Social media platforms are some of the most easily accessible forms of news and with the growing generations, so the technology is only going to grow. With that, the use of social media in younger generations are going to grow alongside it. Globally, there is evidence that through social media, youth have become more directly involved in protests, social campaigns and generally, in the sharing of news across multiple platforms.

The number of people who use social media platforms such as Twitter, Facebook, Instagram, or Snapchat as ways to seek information has increased significantly in recent years especially for people who are part of the younger generation.TikTok is a rapidly expanding platform that young adults can use to find news content on social media. TikTok is one of the sites that young adults and teens utilize to get news about trending themes and controversial topics. The younger generation accepts without hesitation the information that their favorite YouTubers, influencers, and celebrities distribute or promote to their fan base. Knowing these elements is crucial because users today are quick to propagate false information through their preferred media outlets. Although they are popular, 47% of people around the world believe that social media influencers and online personalities are just as concerning as politicians. Source information shows that one third of people aged 18 to 24 use social media as their primary source of news. This number of social media users who utilise social media for news is more than online news sites and television news and printed news combined.

In the United States, Common Sense Media conducted a 2020 nationally representative survey of American teens (ages 13–18) that found that the most common way teens got the news was from personalities, influencers, and celebrities followed on social media or YouTube (39%), despite trusting this type of news source less than other forms, such as local newspapers or local TV news networks. The most commonly mentioned sources on social media or YouTube included PewDiePie, Trevor Noah, CNN, Donald Trump, and Beyoncé.

Popularity and Trust of Different News Sources by U.S. Teens Ages 13–18 in 2020
News source	Percent who get news "often" from source	Percent who trust information from the source "a lot"
Personalities/influencers/celebrities followed on social media or YouTube	39%	15%
News aggregators (e.g., Google news)	27%	18%
Digital media outlets/blogs (e.g., Buzzfeed)	21%	10%
Traditional TV news networks	16%	21%
Local newspapers/TV shows	13%	28%
Comedy shows (e.g., Last Week Tonight with John Oliver)	9%	7%
Podcasts	9%	6%
Traditional print/online newspapers	6%	22%

This popularity of using social media as a news source in the United States is consistent with previous data. Based on interviews with 61 teenagers, conducted from December 2007 to February 2011, most of the teen participants from American high schools reported reading print newspapers only "sometimes," with fewer than 10% reading them daily. The teenagers instead reported learning about current events from social media sites such as Facebook, MySpace, YouTube, and blogs.

=== Across race, gender and political demographics ===
Just as variances occur in social media usage rates between different age demographics, similar variances occur across different racial, gender, and political demographics.

A 2021 study from PEW Research Center reported that White adults are the leading users (62%) of both Facebook and Reddit as a news source but make up less than half (40%) of this population on Instagram. Instagram is the platform that accounts for the largest proportion of Black and Hispanic adult news users, boasting 22% and 27% of these demographics respectively.

A separate study from the year prior found that Black and Hispanic social media users are the most likely to consider social media platforms to be valuable news sources. 60% of Black users and 53% of Hispanic users reported that they held social media to be "very important" or "somewhat important" to their involvement with political and social issues that are important to them, in contrast to the 37% of White social media users from the same poll.

In terms of gender variances, the initial article highlights the likelihood of Facebook news users to identify as female, totalling 65% of the overall population compared to the 35% reported to identify as male. Since Elon Musk took over the platform in 2022 more young men have joined and news consumption on X remains stable or is increasing in many countries.

Differences in social media news usage across political demographics correlate to the overall partisan usage rates attributed to each platform. An April 2021 PEW Research Center report found that 77% of Democrat/Democratic-leaning individuals admitted to using social media, compared to the 68% attributed to their Republican/Republican-leaning counterparts.These numbers closely align with the 2021 report, which found that there is no social media platform in which social media news users are more likely to be Republican/Republican leaning.

== Cognitive effects ==
=== Effects on knowledge ===
A meta-analysis reviewed two opposing viewpoints: while some researchers previously concluded that social media fosters political knowledge through interactive engagement, others contended that algorithms and information overload limit its educational potential. The author concludes that individuals who use social media for political news consumption gain limited long-term knowledge and retain little about where they obtained that knowledge. Most researchers agree that using social media for information consumption has a minimal impact on contributing to an informed and educated society regarding political matters. However, some researchers argue that, despite limited knowledge gain and retention, social media exposes users to topics they would not have otherwise encountered and inspires further research.

Researchers' consensus is that social media does not make users more politically informed than traditional news sources. A case study in Sweden illustrates this concept by examining political knowledge during and after an election cycle. Researchers found that individuals retained more information from conventional news sources than from social media. One explanation for this is that social media delivers personalized news streams in contrast to the curated coverage of traditional outlets. Some researchers theorize that users who rely solely on social media for news may be less exposed to mainstream outlets, and their feeds may prioritize entertainment or sensational content over political or newsworthy topics. Additionally, social media users sometimes develop a false sense of their level of knowledge due to seeing headlines on their newsfeed without reading the content contained in the article or seeking external information sources.

=== Effects on individual and collective memory ===
The ability to accurately recall where one learned something is fundamental for evaluating its reliability or accuracy, or for being able to find the information at a later date. Individuals may become confused about the origin of information or the source of news when consuming content on social media. For example, people misidentified certain televised advertisements that seemed like news, as actual news about 70% of the time. A study published in March 2020 examined how different generations are able to remember the content and source of information they read on social media and traditional news sources. The study found that content read on social media was remembered better by both younger and older generations than traditional news content. The study also found that when the content and format of a news headline do not match one another, the participants were less likely to remember the source information. The adults in the older generation were more likely to think that a news headline was from a traditional source rather than a social media post. Therefore, it is not uncommon for people to forget where one found a piece of information, especially when that information was read on social media. These findings suggest that the disappearance of boundaries that exist between traditional news sources and social media platforms has possible implications for peoples memories on the source of information they are reading.

News media and television journalism have been a key feature in the shaping of American collective memory for much of the twentieth century. Indeed, since the United States' colonial era, news media has influenced collective memory and discourse about national development and trauma. In many ways, mainstream journalists have maintained an authoritative voice as the storytellers of the American past. Their documentary style narratives, detailed exposes, and their positions in the present make them prime sources for public memory. Specifically, news media journalists have shaped collective memory on nearly every major national event – from the deaths of social and political figures to the progression of political hopefuls. Journalists provide elaborate descriptions of commemorative events in U.S. history and contemporary popular cultural sensations. Many Americans learn the significance of historical events and political issues through news media, as they are presented on popular news stations. However, journalistic influence is growing less important, whereas social networking sites such as Facebook, YouTube and Twitter, provide a constant supply of alternative news sources for users.

As social networking becomes more popular among older and younger generations, sites such as Facebook and YouTube, gradually undermine the traditionally authoritative voices of news media. For example, American citizens contest media coverage of various social and political events as they see fit, inserting their voices into the narratives about America's past and present and shaping their own collective memories. An example of this is the public explosion of the Trayvon Martin shooting in Sanford, Florida. News media coverage of the incident was minimal until social media users made the story recognizable through their constant discussion of the case. Approximately one month after the fatal shooting of Trayvon Martin, its online coverage by everyday Americans garnered national attention from mainstream media journalists, in turn exemplifying media activism. In some ways, the spread of this tragic event through alternative news sources parallels that of Emmett Till – whose murder by lynching in 1955 became a national story after it was circulated in African-American and Communist newspapers.

== Echo chambers ==
Echo chambers are environments where individuals frequently interact with others who share similar beliefs, reinforcing their existing viewpoints. Researchers can investigate echo chambers by examining information diversity and bias in user interactions on contentious topics, such as gun control, abortion, and vaccination.

Each social media platform has its own distinct features that influence the prevalence or absence of echo chambers through their built-in algorithms and user interfaces. For example, Facebook is often criticized for segregating information based on users' attitudes or beliefs, whereas platforms like Reddit present a more diverse range of content. Facebook displays content in a manner that is slanted to align with the user's political affiliation. A Facebook user may be exposed to a variety of information sources. Still, these sources frequently share a slant that aligns with the user's existing beliefs or content they interact with, unless they subscribe to a specific page or account. In contrast, Reddit users are less likely to form groups based on their preexisting beliefs and instead explore interest-based connections, resulting in increased exposure to opposing viewpoints compared to Facebook users.

People's beliefs, values, and ways of thinking play a big role in how echo chambers form and develop. These personal and cultural influences make the study of echo chambers more complicated, especially since researchers from different fields, such as psychology, sociology, and media studies, are all trying to understand how and why they happen.

A systematic review of research found that echo chambers tend to create an environment conducive to misinformation and disinformation, with detrimental effects on information consumption. Individuals who consume information in echo chambers are less likely to be exposed to opposing viewpoints, which has been shown to increase negative attitudes toward them.

Researchers consider information diversity and bias when exploring the impact of an echo chamber on a population. This is often achieved by examining user interactions and platform usage on contentious topics, such as gun control, abortion, and vaccination. Echo chambers are often associated with social media platforms, each with distinct features that influence the prevalence or absence of echo chambers through their algorithms and user interfaces. The differences in social media platforms result in inconsistencies in polarization, the level of extreme viewpoints presented, and reduced exposure to counter perspectives.

What the news covers on social media can change perspective from one person to another. If somebody mostly only sees one picture of the side of an issue on social media, they're more likely to visit news websites that share that same perspective. While over-time however, this can make people believe these like-minded news sources without factually checking with reliable sources, as the ideas keep seeming to get reinforced with more "evidence" from these news sources.

Some researchers argue that echo chambers have a positive impact on the information environment by facilitating the connection and communication of like-minded users more efficiently. However, this is a minority viewpoint in academic research, where researchers largely agree that echo chambers reduce exposure to opposing viewpoints and that social media platforms largely contribute to the formation and expansion of echo chambers.

=== Fact-checking ===
To combat the spread of disinformation and misinformation, some social media platforms have implemented fact-checking measures to rate the accuracy of user-generated content. A systematic review of research found that fact-checking or warning tags placed on inaccurate social media content have a positive impact on users' ability to identify false information. The level of impact is influenced by the individual's existing beliefs, their affiliation with the topic, and their prior level of knowledge. Fact-checking is also less effective when only part of the information is false or when the false information is delivered as part of a campaign statement. On social media, users recognize posts as moderately less accurate when they are accompanied by a rated false tag and have an accompanying warning about the post's accuracy. However, the effectiveness of the tags is only as practical as they are accurate. If a factual or accurate post is labeled as inaccurate, social media users often deem it less accurate.

Despite the consensus among researchers on the effectiveness of fact-checking measures on social media, the United States population has diverse opinions on the implementation of fact-checking tools. A Pew Research study identified mixed views on whether social media sites should use algorithms to detect false information, with roughly one-third believing it was a good idea, one-third believing it was a bad idea, and the remaining one-third being unsure. Most respondents reported having seen information labeled as false on social media. Additionally, 7 out of 10 respondents believe that fact-checking results in viewpoints being censored. Results indicate that Republicans are more likely than Democrats to think that fact-checking algorithms are detrimental to society.

== Societal examples ==
On October 2, 2013, the most common hashtag throughout the United States was "#governmentshutdown", as well as ones focusing on political parties, Barack Obama, and healthcare. Most news sources have Twitter, and Facebook, pages, like CNN and the New York Times, providing links to their online articles, getting an increased readership. Additionally, several college news organizations and administrators have Twitter pages as a way to share news and connect to students. According to "Reuters Institute Digital News Report 2013", in the US, among those who use social media to find news, 47% of these people are under 45 years old, and 23% are above 45 years old. However social media as a main news gateway does not follow the same pattern across countries. For example, in this report, in Brazil, 60% of the respondents said social media was one of the five most important ways to find news online, 45% in Spain, 17% in the UK, 38% in Italy, 14% in France, 22% in Denmark, 30% in the U.S., and 12% in Japan. Moreover, there are differences among countries about commenting on news in social networks, 38% of the respondents in Brazil said they commented on news in social network in a week. These percentages are 21% in the U.S. and 10% in the UK. The authors argued that differences among countries may be due to culture difference rather than different levels of access to technical tools. An influential example of social media making news more accessible and widely spread is the Arab Spring. Protesters used social media platforms, to create plans for in person protests and to spread video and images captured from the events that were created online.

Rainie and Wellman have argued that media making now has become a participation work, which changes communication systems. The center of power is shifted from only the media (as the gatekeeper) to the peripheral area, which may include government, organizations, and out to the edge, the individual. These changes in communication systems raise empirical questions about trust to media effect. Prior empirical studies have shown that trust in information sources plays a major role in people's decision making. People's attitudes more easily change when they hear messages from trustworthy sources. In the Reuters report, 27% of respondents agree that they worry about the accuracy of a story on a blog. However, 40% of them believe the stories on blogs are more balanced than traditional papers because they are provided with a range of opinions. Recent research has shown that in the new social media communication environment, the civil or uncivil nature of comments will bias people's information processing even if the message is from a trustworthy source, which bring the practical and ethical question about the responsibility of communicator in the social media environment.

The case study on the 2013 urban protests in Brazil reflects how digital communication form a new type of e-democracy in mass societies. The case study reveals how Brazilians used social media to organize manifestations regarding cost of public transportation, violence, homophobia, and corruption. The young population dominated the demonstrations. They posted videos and pictures on WhatsApp chat groups, created online events on Facebook, and gathered over 250.000 protestors on the streets. Consequently, Brazilians were able to modify functions in an institutionalized system, not only by promoting awareness on certain social problems, but also by inducing president Dilma Rousseff's impeachment in 2016.

In Brazil, the Instagram and Twitter-based account Choquei faced criticism for sharing unverified information and fake news, receiving national attention as a fast-paced distributor of news and entertainment content, especially during the 2022 presidential election. Initially focused on viral topics and entertainment news, the account began covering national politics following increased public demand for political content. Its founder, Raphael Sousa Oliveira, cited dissatisfaction with President Jair Bolsonaro's handling of the COVID-19 pandemic as a turning point. Choquei subsequently adopted a pro-Luiz Inácio Lula da Silva stance and integrated political coverage into its daily output.

== Implications of using social media as a news source ==
Using non-traditional platforms such as social media as a news source is an easy way to gain access to numerous different types of information such as gossip blogs, sporting events, political matters, and business affairs. Using social media as a news outlet helps relieve the hardships of navigating through several websites and articles to find one source with information pertaining to the topic being explored. However, using social media as a news gateway also presents several implications which can be challenging to guide through. Some of the most current issues regarding using social media as a news source are:

- Spreading of false news
- The "news finds me" perception
- Biased news articles
- News containing disturbing image or video content

The spread of fake news has become a complex challenge for social media platforms to mediate. False information is being spread by individual social media users and companies and organizations who use social media to communicate with their audience. Approximately 23% of social media users have reported that they have spread fake news, and fake news spreads faster than true news on social media, primarily because people share it amongst others. One study on Twitter users found that fake news can spread up to ten times further than true news and another study on Twitter users found that 80% of fake news is spread by less than 0.1% of users. In today's day and age, almost 62% of adults get their news from social media platforms and that number is increasing. There are two distinctions between news found on social media and traditional journalism. The first is that any user can create news on social media, regardless if it is fake or real. Then others are able to share it and spread that information to others rapidly. The second distinction is that the majority of social media platforms present news feeds to their users. The feeds consist of a mix of news from friends, followers, sources based on past activities or interactions and from advertisers who pay to have their content on users' feeds. In 2017, Facebook gave its new emoji reactions five times the weight in its algorithms as its like button, which data scientists at the company in 2019 confirmed had disproportionately boosted toxicity, misinformation and low-quality news.

In recent times, research has been focused on the growing "news finds me" perception, which is the phenomenon that comes as a result of individuals trusting in social media algorithms and reposted content to provide them with all the relevant news they need. The primary causes of concern surrounding this phenomenon are the loss of contextualization and reliance on peers that characterize it.

Another implication that social media as a news source has introduced is the rise in biased news. In recent studies, it has been stated that social media users tend to create an environment in which the pages and users they follow only reflect and reinforce the opinions of their own. This phenomenon is referred to as an echo chamber and is fueled by confirmation bias. Research has found that "it is possible to determine the political leanings of a Twitter user by simply looking at the partisan preferences of their friends". When social media users rely on these networking platforms for their daily news sources, it is possible that they are only receiving information that is a reflection of what they want to see in society, further implicating the matter by ignoring issues that require being addressed.

Social media may not always be a reliable source for information. False news is not sufficiently regulated on social media platforms, therefore it is common on social media.

Another common issue that has risen through the use of social media as a news platform is mixing information and altering or exaggerating a story or event. Social media being such an open, diverse and accessible place to display information has made it an easy way for information to be altered and changed, which can lead to false news and can even be dangerous depending on the target audience. Along with how common false news is on social media platforms, media is also consumed and retired at an alarming rate. Oftentimes headlines on social media are quickly discarded and it is very challenging to keep a subject relevant.

== Journalism and social media ==
=== North American Journalist Code of Ethics ===
The Society of Professional Journalists (SPJ) represents American journalists and the Canadian Association of Journalists (CAJ) advocate for Canadian journalists. Both of these organizations have set ethical standards that journalist should follow in order to preserve their professional integrity. These codes of ethics are as follows:

- As a journalist, you must be accurate, just, and diverse. Information should be gathered, reported, and interpreted by journalists in an honest and courageous manner.
- The goal of ethical journalism should be to minimize harm and respect their sources, subjects, colleagues, and members of the public
- Journalists should act independently; their main priority should be that of serving the public
- Transparency in ethical journalism means explaining to the public one's decisions and taking responsibility for your work.

=== Digital journalism ===
The CAJ makes note of how these codes of ethics should still apply to digital media. The general recommendations made about digital media and journalism are as follows:

- Regardless of the medium where journalist publish or broadcast stories, they must adhere to their ethical guidelines.
- Blogging, social media posts, and all other online content should be carefully considered, and misinformation should never be re-posted.
- Journalist should never compromise a piece of work's credibility, accuracy, or fairness in order to publish a story faster online.
- Information that is put online can be considered as public, journalists should always ask permission, verify the information, and always source properly.
- Journalists should be mindful when using social media for personal use. Anything that is said can affect credibility or cause a conflict of interest.

=== Journalist's use of social media ===
The spread of news has become increasingly dependent on websites such as blogs, YouTube, Twitter, and Facebook. These platforms are reliant on brief and fast content in order to keep the interest of their users, therefore quantity is better than quality. Journalists face more challenges because of all the information that comes through these unofficial networks. They need to filter through all so that their work can still be reliable, but they still face the pressure to produce more content and faster than traditional news. Journalists can accomplish their tasks more efficiently with social media tools but journalists must be wary of how their actions while using these tools can affect their audiences. Journalists have an impact on the conduct of society by the way citizens perceive their work and the journalism industry. With the constant evolution of the internet and the growing need for social media in the workplace, the work of journalists and their practices are also changing. Traditionally, when collecting the publics opinion, journalists ask participants questions and participants are aware of what is being asked of them, and by whom, but with the rise of social media, journalists are able to collect public information without social media users knowing or consenting. For example, when journalists quote social media posts, it may be seen as an invasion of privacy since the usernames are sometimes used to identify the individuals being quoted. These practices become questionable to their audiences; it depends on what they believe is suitable social media behaviour. The use of social media as a journalistic source may also be taken out of context and misinterpreted which in turn misrepresents the public. People who are unsure about whether journalists can reliably make claims using social media may question the value and integrity of the journalists' reports. The media and media news source, such as journalists must present information that is trustworthy.

=== Social media guidelines for journalists ===
The Agence France-Presse (AFP) and the New York Times both encouraged their journalists in 2017 to use social networking platforms because it can create relationships with their readers, help them make new contacts, and even reach a greater audience. Both organizations have created guidelines for their journalists to follow. Journalists may have professional accounts in which they clearly state where they work, their posts should reflect those of the company, and they should not share any partisan opinions. Journalists are allowed to have a private personal account, but they should still be careful of what they post, like, or comment.

=== Layoffs, closures, and the search for a new business model for journalism ===
The digital media industry is facing significant challenges as Vice, BuzzFeed News, Vox, and Gawker all experienced staff cuts, program closures, or complete shutdowns. These developments are driven by a historic slowdown in digital advertising, raising concerns among media companies about further cuts. The shift away from social media platforms, such as Twitter and Facebook, has added to the industry's woes, as these platforms increasingly prioritize other content and control digital advertising revenue. The marriage between news outlets and social media has become rocky, with platforms favoring polarization and extremism for click-driven engagement. As the decline of Web 2.0 becomes evident, with rampant misinformation and user dissatisfaction, the future of digital news remains uncertain. However, trends like niche newsletters, paid subscriptions, and smaller online communities are emerging as potential alternatives, offering hope for a rebirth of the industry on a human scale.
