= RedeTV! =

Brazilian television network

Coordinates: 23.521460°S 46.763165°W

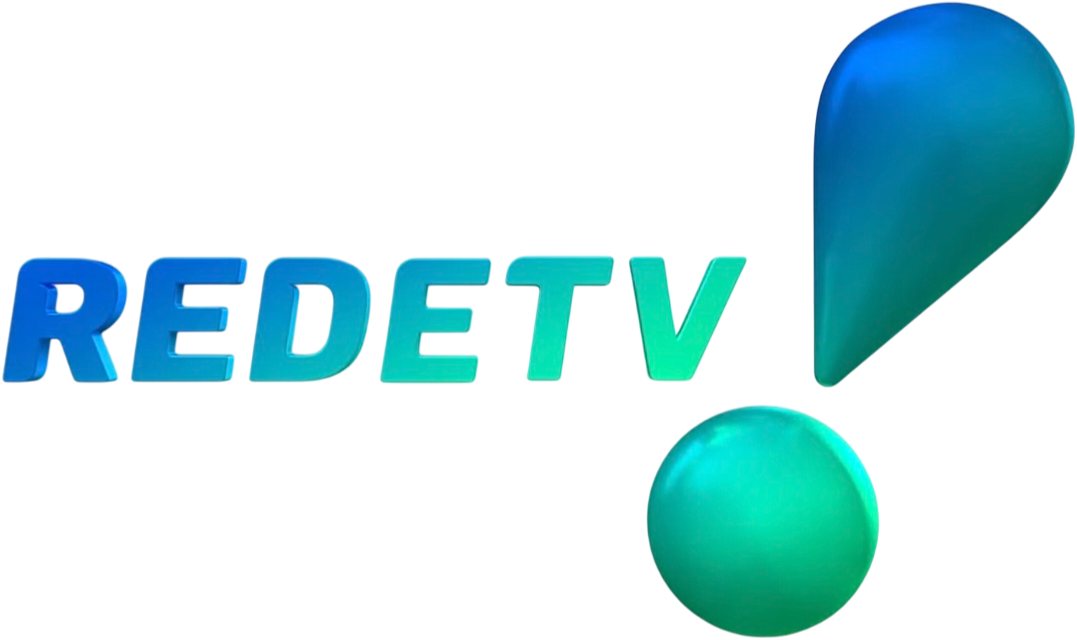
- Type: Free-to-air television network
- Country: Brazil
- Stations: RedeTV! Belo Horizonte; RedeTV! Fortaleza; RedeTV! Recife; RedeTV! Rio de Janeiro; RedeTV! São Paulo
- Affiliates: See List of RedeTV! affiliates
- Headquarters: Osasco, Brazil

Programming
- Language: Portuguese
- Picture format: 1080i HDTV

Ownership
- Owner: Amilcare Dallevo Jr.
- Key people: Amilcare Dallevo Jr., Marcelo de Carvalho

History
- Founded: 15 November 1999; 26 years ago
- Launched: May 1999 (test broadcast as TV!); 15 November 1999 (official launch as RedeTV!)
- Replaced: Rede Manchete
- Former names: TV!

Links
- Website: redetv.uol.com.br

Availability

Terrestrial
- Digital terrestrial television: 21 UHF (Rio de Janeiro); 24 UHF (Belo Horizonte and Recife); 29 UHF (São Paulo); 34 UHF (Fortaleza)

RedeTV! (Portuguese: [ˈʁedʒi teˈve], also Rede TV! or RTV! or TV Ômega) is a Brazilian television network owned by Amilcare Dallevo Jr. It is the newest television network, among the five major networks in Brazil, being a relaunch of Rede Manchete in 1999.

RedeTV! has modern production plants, located in São Paulo, Rio de Janeiro, Belo Horizonte, Recife and Fortaleza. RedeTV! is headquartered in the CTD - Centro de Televisão Digital (Digital Television Center, in English), located in Osasco, a suburb of São Paulo, where its news division is based. It was the first network worldwide to be broadcast in 3D.

With a market share of 0.7 points in 2018, it has the smallest market share out of the top five Brazilian TV networks.

== History ==
On 8 May 1999, two days before Rede Manchete ceased operations, its license was sold to TeleTV Group (now TV Ômega Ltda.). RedeTV! would begin test broadcasts later that month as TV!, and temporarily aired several of Rede Manchete's programs and a modified version of its daily newscast. On 12 November 1999, the network's test broadcasts were replaced with a countdown clock to its official launch. RedeTV! officially commenced broadcasting at 7:00 am on 15 November 1999.

RedeTV!'s principal shows are Encrenca, the program of greater audience of the transmitter, A Tarde é Sua, an afternoon variety show hosted by Sônia Abrão, Superpop, an entertainment program and TV Fama, a program about celebrities. It was responsible for the Brazilian version of Desperate Housewives, Donas de Casa Desesperadas, series exhibited in 2007. The TV programming is directed mostly to the entertainment, with comedy, talk shows, soap operas, audience shows, journalism, sports, TV series and feminine showbiz.

RedeTV! was the first Brazilian network to produce all of its original programming in high definition.

In September 2009, RedeTV! changed its facilities in Barueri for the Centro de Televisão Digital (CTD) in Osasco (São Paulo). Despite having changed its headquarters to the Centro de Televisão Digital (CTD) in September, the official inauguration of the center was on 13 November, being celebrated with a big party and with the participation of politicians, businessmen and artists such as Luciana Gimenez, Iris Stefanelli and Supla, in addition to President Luiz Inácio Lula da Silva.

In May 2010, Pânico na TV became the first show in the world to do a live 3D transmission in a free-to-pay channel.

In 2011, when the TeleTV Group was closed, the management and ownership of RedeTV! was transferred to Amilcare Dallevo Jr. and Marcelo de Carvalho, which is now owned by their own groups.

In December 2025, Marcelo de Carvalho sold his shareholding in RedeTV! to Amilcare Dallevo Jr., who acquired all of the shares.

== Centers and affiliates ==
RedeTV! has five stations owned and 32 affiliated stations throughout Brazil, totaling 37 stations that rebroadcast the signal from it.

Osasco (São Paulo) – Channel 29 (9.1)

Rio de Janeiro (Rio de Janeiro) – Channel 21 (6.1)

Belo Horizonte (Minas Gerais) – Channel 25 (4.1)

Recife (Pernambuco) – Channel 25 (6.1)

Fortaleza (Ceará) – Channel 34 (2.1)

=== Affiliated stations ===
Acre

- TV Amazônia - Rio Branco - Channel 50
- TV Amazônia - Cruzeiro do Sul - Channel 51.2

Amapá

- TV Tucuju - Macapá - Channel 24

Amazonas

- Inova TV - Manaus - Channel 18

Distrito Federal

- TV Brasília - Brasília - Channel 6

Espírito Santo

- RedeTV! ES - Vila Velha - Channel 18

Maranhão

- TV Guará - Caxias - Channel 10
- Açailândia TV - Açailândia - Channel 5
- TV Nova Era - Lago da Pedra - Channel 5
- TV Liberdade - Codó - Channel 13
- TV Cidade - Zé Doca - Channel 10
- TV São Luís - São Luís - Channel 8
- Imperial TV - Imperatriz - Channel 4
- TV Rio Flores - Presidente Dutra, Maranhão - Channel 9
- Balsas TV - Balsas, Maranhão - Channel 23
- TV Açucena - Balsas, Maranhão - Channel 10
- Rede TV Santa Inês - Santa Inês - Channel 15
- TV Cidade - Pinheiro, Maranhão - Channel 5
- TV Integração - Araioses - Channel 8
- TV Vale do Itapecuru - Itapecuru Mirim Channel 11
- Gente TV - Bacabal - Channel 45
- TV Pio Xil - Pio XII, Maranhão - Channel 8
- TV Viana - Viana, Maranhão - Channel 42
- TV Olho d'Água - Olho d'Água das Cunhãs - Channel 48
- TV Rosário - Rosário - Channel 40

Mato Grosso

- TV Pantanal - Cuiabá - Channel 22
- Gente TV - Sinop - Channel 2
- TV Migrantes - Guarantã do Norte - Channel 3
- TV SAT - Sorriso - Channel 3
- TV Pantaneira - Poconé - Channel 11
- TV Portal da Amazônia - Pontes e Lacerda - Channel 12
- TV Apiacás - Apiacás - Channel 25
- TV Figueira - Lucas do Rio Verde - Channel 14
- TV Brasnorte - Brasnorte - Channel (Unknown)
- Rede TV Nortelândia - Nortelândia - Channel 11
- Rede TV Barra dos Graças- Barra do Garças - Channel 16
- Rede TV Campo Novo dos Parceis - Campo Novo do Parecis - Channel 12
- Rede TV Tangará - Tangará da Serra - Channel 16

Minas Gerais

- TV Mais - Uberlândia - Channel 15

Pará

- Rede TV - Belém/Marabá/Altamira- Channel 47/38/23
- Amazônia TV - Parauapebas - Channel 33
- Rede TV Castanhal - Castanhal - Channel 27
- Rede TV Cametá - Cametá - Channel 38
- TV Atalaia - Óbidos - Channel 10
- Rede TV Itaituba - Itaituba - Channel 4
- Rede TV Paragominas - Paragominas - Channel 29
- Rede TV Redenção - Redenção, Pará - Channel 26
- Rede TV Karajás - Canaã dos Carajás - Channel 17
- Rede TV Capanema - Capanema, Pará - Channel 44
- VicTV - Breves, Pará - Channel 28
- TV Cidade Norte - Capitão Poço - Channel 43
- Rede TV Abaetetuba - Abaetetuba - Channel 17
- Rede TV Tucuruí - Tucuruí - Channel 4
- TV Paraíso - Portel - Channel (Unknown)

Paraíba

- TV Norte Paraíba - João Pessoa - Channel 10

Paraná

- RedeTV! Caiuá - Umuarama - Channel 32
- TV Celinauta - Pato Branco - Channel 7

Piauí

- O Dia TV - Teresina - Channel
- Rede TV Piripiri - Piripiri, Piauí - Channel 2

Rio Grande do Sul

- TV Pampa - Porto Alegre - Channel 4
- TV Pampa - Santa Maria - Channel 4
- TV Pampa - Carazinho - Channel 9
- TV Pampa - Pelotas - Channel 13

Rondônia

- RedeTV! Rondônia - Porto Velho - Channel 17
- RedeTV! Cacoal - Cacoal - Channel 49
- RedeTV! Ji-Paraná - Ji-Paraná - Channel 7
- RedeTV! Pimenta Bueno - Pimenta Bueno - Channel 7
- RedeTV!Rolim de Moura - Rolim de Moura - Channel 7
- RedeTV! Vilhena - Vilhena - Channel 9
- RedeTV!Ariquemes - Ariquemes - Channel 49
- TV R Gallo - Alta Floresta d'Oeste - Channel 45
- TV Verdes Campos - Campo Novo de Rondônia - Channel 7 (Channel 9 Digital (Campos Marques)

Roraima

- Tropical TV - Boa Vista - Channel 10

Santa Catarina

- Rede TV Sul - São Lourenço do Oeste - Channel 13 (Ampranet), 40 (Olé TV)

Tocantins

- TV Araguaína - Araguaína - Channel 7
- RedeTV! Tocantins - Palmas - Channel 29
- TV Miracema - Miracema do Tocantins - Channel 19
- TV Cúpula - Augustinópolis - Channel 3

== Network slogans ==
- 1999: A nova era da televisão brasileira. (The new era of Brazilian television.)
- 1999–2000: Uma opção de qualidade na sua TV. (A quality option in your TV.)
- 2000–2001: A nova rede de TV do Brasil. (The new TV network in Brazil.)
- 2001–2008, 2017-2019: A Rede de TV que mais cresce no Brasil. (Brazil's fastest growing TV network.)
- 2008–2009: Quem vê, já sabe. (Who watches it, already knows it.)
- 2009–2017: Em rede com você. (In network with you.)
- 2011: Primeira em tecnologia HD 3D. (First in HD-3D technology.)
- 2019–present: Evoluindo com você (Evolving with you.)

== RedeTV! shows ==
- O Céu é o Limite (L'eredità)
- Mega Senha (Million Dollar Password)
- Conexão Models
- Operação de Risco
- Entubados (2018)
- Dr. Hollywood (Dr. 90210)
- TV Fama (Entertainment Tonight)
- Operação Cupido (Game Show)
- Shark Tank Brasil (Dragons' Den)
- A Melhor Viagem (Game Show) (2019–2020)
- Chega Mais (Game Show) (2015)
- Sob Medida (2013-2015)
- The Bachelor Brasil (The Bachelor) (2014)
- Estação Teen (2012)
- Saturday Night Live Brasil (Saturday Night Live) (2012)
- Sexo a 3 (2012)
- O Último Passageiro (The Last Passenger/All or nothing) (2010-2013)
- Pânico na TV (Jackass) (2003-2012)
- Taxi do Milão (Cash Cab) (2010)
- Receita Pop (Ready Steady Cook) (2010)
- The Amazing Race: A Corrida Milionária (The Amazing Race) (2007-2008)
- Clube das Mulheres (2008)
- Donas de Casa Desesperadas (Desperate Housewives) (2007-2008)
- GAS Sound (2007-2008)
- Insomnia (2004-2007)
- Apartamento das Modelos (2002)
- Interligado Games (Game Show) (2003–2011)
- Interligado (1999-2003)
- National Football League (2022-)
- Loterias Caixa (national lottery)

== See also ==
- Rede Manchete
