= RedeTV! São Paulo =

RedeTV! São Paulo (ZYB 863)
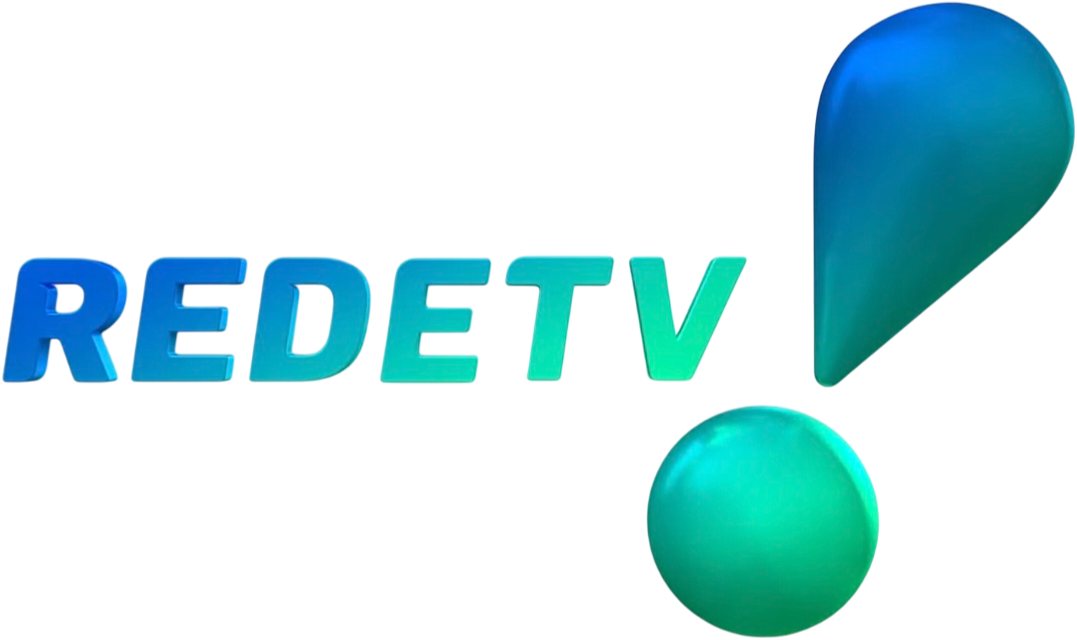
- Osasco/São Paulo; Brazil
- Channels: Digital: 29 (UHF); Virtual: 9
- Branding: RedeTV!

Programming
- Affiliations: RedeTV!

Ownership
- Owner: TV Ômega Ltda.

History
- First air date: June 5, 1983
- Former names: Rede Manchete São Paulo (1983–1999); TV! São Paulo (1999)
- Former channel numbers: Analog: 9 (VHF, 1983–2017)
- Former affiliations: Rede Manchete (1983–1999)

Technical information
- Licensing authority: ANATEL
- ERP: 15 kW
- Transmitter coordinates: 23°32′36.9″S 46°40′58.4″W

Links
- Public license information: Profile
- Website: redetv.uol.com.br

RedeTV! São Paulo (channel 9) is a Brazilian television station based in Osasco, but licensed in the city of São Paulo, respectively the city and capital of the state of the same name. It is both an owned-and-operated station and flagship station of locally based television network RedeTV!. The station's headquarters is the Digital Television Center in the Vila São José neighborhood, where RedeTV!'s programming is generated for the entire country.

== History ==
The license was the only one Rede Manchete inherited from TV Excelsior during the early 80s auction caused by the shutdown of Rede Tupi on July 18, 1980.

The station launched on June 5, 1983, at 7 pm, alongside Rede Manchete. The station was, alongside Manchete Rio, one of the two signal generators, toggling with the main station in Rio. Initially, it broadcast from a small three-floor building at the Sumaré neighborhood, Torre Bruxelas, where its transmitters were located and the reporting staff worked for the network's news programming, in an annexed house. On January 24, 1990, the new facilities were inaugurated, located at Avenida Ida Kolb, 551, in the Limão district.

=== Crisis and strikes ===
On June 16, 1993, the station's programming was suspended due to delays in employees' salaries. Around 50 employees occupied the station's old building, and displayed slides instead of the station's programming explaining that they had been without salaries for five months. Unionists from CUT and the São Paulo Broadcasters Union invaded the station accompanied by some politicians from aligned parties such as PCdoB and PT, taking the station's signal off the air and broadcasting alternative programming where politicians and unionists discussed the strike and the station's financial situation.

Due to a lack of parts, the TV Manchete transmitter in the capital of São Paulo was operating at 30% of its power. The crisis that was taking place on the network caused problems such as lack of maintenance at its stations.

In September 1998, after 15 years, Rede Manchete began a crisis that would culminate in the end of the broadcaster on May 10, 1999. On that day, Manchete was sold to the TeleTV group, remaining on the air for a few more days, until it was replaced by transitional programming, temporarily assuming the TV! brand on screen (it was known as Rede TV! de facto) until November 1999.

Rede Manchete and its O&Os were sold to Amilcare Dallevo and Marcelo de Carvalho, owners of Grupo TeleTV, famous for having created the 0900 service on television programs in which there was interaction with the viewer. They founded RedeTV! on November 15, 1999, and their own broadcasters started to use this name. The generator was transferred to the studios of the new broadcaster in Barueri, in Greater São Paulo, and the Rio broadcaster became just a branch of the new network.

The former Rede Manchete building located in Limão was sold in 2001 to Editora Escala, becoming its headquarters since then. The M, the logo of the network that was located at the top of the building, remained in place until 2004 when the new owners sold the object to a steel industry because they had not found another use for it.

RedeTV! started regular broadcasting on November 15, 1999, through VHF channel 9, becoming the main station in the process. As the former station had its headquarters in the Limão neighborhood seized due to the payment of debts, RedeTV! He was left with only the Brussels Tower, located in Sumaré, having to rent new studios in the city of Barueri, at Rua Bahia, 205, in the Alphaville neighborhood, where he settled between 1999 and 2009.

That year, on November 15, to mark RedeTV!'s 10th anniversary, it moved to Centro de Televisão Digital, a 60,000 m^{2} television complex in the Vila São José neighborhood, in Osasco. The inauguration event of the new headquarters was attended by several guests, including then president Luiz Inácio Lula da Silva.

== Technical information ==
| Virtual channel | Digital channel | Screen | Content |
|---|---|---|---|
| 9.1 | 29 UHF | 1080i | Band RS/Band's main schedule |

RedeTV! São Paulo debuted its digital signal in São Paulo on virtual UHF channel 29, on December 2, 2007, the date digital TV transmissions began in Brazil. The broadcaster was the first to generate all of its programming in high definition, when its programs began to be produced at the CTD in Osasco on November 13, 2009. At the same time, it also began to show reruns of its programs at times occupied by infomercials and rentals for churches on its analog signal, going against the determination of multiprogramming only on public broadcasters.

On May 23, 2010, it also became the first over-the-air television station of the world to air in 3D, during the airing of Pânico na TV!, using subchannel 9.2. The station deactivated its 3D signal on June 19, 2015. On February 7, 2021, the station reactivated channel 9.2, starting to show teleclasses from Universo EADTV, the result of a partnership with RedeTV! with Cesumar University.

Based on the federal decree transitioning Brazilian TV stations from analogue to digital signals, RedeTV! São Paulo, as well as other broadcasters in the São Paulo Metropolitan Region, ceased transmissions on VHF channel 9 on March 29, 2017, following the official ANATEL roadmap. The station cut the signal at 11:59 pm, during Superpop. Its presenter Luciana Gimenez went up to the station's technical center and pressed the button that automatically inserted the slide from MCTIC and ANATEL about the switch-off.
