= TV Salvador =

TV Salvador (ZYA 307)
- Salvador, Bahia; Brazil
- City: Salvador
- Branding: TV Salvador

Programming
- Affiliations: Independent station

Ownership
- Owner: Rede Bahia; (Televisão Salvador Ltda.)
- Sister stations: TV Bahia

History
- First air date: December 31, 2000
- Last air date: March 5, 2013
- Former channel numbers: Analog: 28 (UHF, 2000–2013)

Technical information
- Licensing authority: ANATEL
- Transmitter coordinates: 13°0′12.2″S 38°30′42.4″W

TV Salvador was a Brazilian television station based in Salvador, capital of the state of Bahia. It operated on UHF channels 28 and 36 on NET and was owned by Rede Bahia.

== History ==
TV Salvador was opened on December 31, 2000, with an independent and completely local schedule. The station broadcast live the Summer Festival, promoted by IContent, a company that is also part of Rede Bahia, in addition to showing programs from TV Bahia, such as Na Carona, which was shown on the station at 4:50 pm and 22:15, Aprovado, Bahia Meio Dia, Globo Esporte Bahia, Bahia Rural and Rede Bahia Revista, also opening space for programs made by stations from Rede Bahia de Televisão such as Canal Aberto, from TV Subaé, Encontro Com, from TV Santa Cruz, Somos Nós, from TV Sudoeste and Tema, from TV São Francisco, in addition to showing local blocks of news programs from all inland stations in the interior. In December 2002, an agreement was signed with the Portuguese version of GNT to show some of its productions, mainly musical and cultural offerings and some programs related to Carnaval, in addition to two concerts by Daniela Mercury. TV Salvador's terrestrial signal was limited exclusively to the metropolitan area of Salvador, reaching an audience of just over 750,000 potential households in 2002; the cable signal, reaching just over 46,000 households, in addition to being captured in Salvador, was also received in other cities covered by NET Salvador, in Vitória da Conquista and Itabuna.

On January 19, 2004, the station changed from channel 38 to channel 36 on NET.

In 2012, the sale of the station by Rede Bahia to an evangelical business group was confirmed. 19 programs started to be broadcast on the Rede Brasil retransmitter, on channel 51. On March 5, 2013, the station officially ended its programming, after the sale was completed.

== Programming ==
Several programs made up the station's schedule before the closure.

- A casa é nossa, with Alaor Lopes;
- Alta Velocidade, with Selma Morais;
- Amigos do Aquarela, with Wilson Sales;
- Ativa Idade, with Margareth Ribeiro;
- Bahia Náutica, with Denis Peres;
- Baluarte, with Jony Torres;
- Câmera Express;
- Canal Circuito de Alta Decoração;
- Cartaz;
- Contraplano;
- Em Off;
- Estúdio Vida, with Vanda Martins;
- Fala Bahia, com Emmerson José;
- Falando Nisso, with Joelma Carvalho
- Fama e Sucesso, with Jorge Pedra;
- Ícones, with Tom Mercury
- Imóveis na TV;
- Interseções, with Cláudio Cardoso;
- Linha Aberta, with Genildo Lawinsky;
- Lorotas com Maroca, with Anamara Barreira;
- Mundo Melhor, with Cláudio Cardoso;
- Nomes, with Luzia Santhana;
- PalcoDois, with Sabrina Alves;
- Por Dentro do Esporte & Marketing, with Eliseu Godoy;
- Rutz, with Moisés Souto;
- Só Para Inteligentes, with Juca Chaves;
- Todos os Tons, with Briza Ribeiro;
- Tudo AV, with Andréa Velame;
- TV FTC;
- Vivendo eu Conto, with Patrícia Lane;

Produced by TV Bahia:

- Aprovado, with Jackson Costa;
- Bahia Meio Dia, with Fernando Sodake and Camila Marinho;
- Bahia Rural, with Valber Carvalho;
- Globo Esporte Bahia, with Patrícia Abreu and Tiago Mastroianni;
- Na Carona, with Liliane Reis;
- Rede Bahia Revista, with Anna Valéria, Dalton Soares and Wanda Chase;

Produzido pela TV São Francisco:

- Tema, with Sibelle Fonseca

Produced by TV Santa Cruz:

- Encontro Com, with Renata Smith

Produced by TV Subaé:

- Canal Aberto, with Eduardo Oliveira

Produced by TV Sudoeste:

- Somos Nós, with Daniela Oliveira
