= Rede Bahia de Televisão =

Brazilian TV network

- Type: Terrestrial television network
- Branding: Rede Bahia
- Country: Brazil
- Availability: Bahia
- Founded: December 9, 1983; 42 years ago by ACM Júnior and César Mata Pires
- TV stations: TV Bahia (Salvador); TV Oeste (Barreiras); TV Santa Cruz (Itabuna); TV São Francisco (Juazeiro); TV Subaé (Feira de Santana); TV Sudoeste (Vitória da Conquista)
- Headquarters: 123 Prof. Aristídes Novis Street, Salvador
- Owner: Rede Bahia
- Key people: Marcos Machado (President)
- Launch date: March 10, 1985; 40 years ago
- Digital channels: 27 UHF (Alagoinhas, Feira de Santana and Uauá); 28 UHF (Ilhéus, Jequié, Juazeiro, Paulo Afonso and Vitória da Conquista); 29 UHF (Barreiras, Porto Seguro and Salvador); 30 UHF (Eunápolis, Guanambi, Itabuna and Teixeira de Freitas)
- Analogue channels: 03 VHF (Alagoinhas); 05 VHF (Guanambi); 06 VHF (Jequié and Paulo Afonso); 07 VHF (Uauá and Teixeira de Freitas); 09 VHF (Eunápolis and Porto Seguro); 13 VHF (Ilhéus)
- Picture format: 1080i (HDTV); 480i (SDTV)
- Affiliation: TV Globo
- Official website: redeglobo.globo.com/redebahia
- Language: Portuguese

Rede Bahia de Televisão (also called as RBT or Rede Bahia) is a Brazilian statewide TV Globo-affiliated commercial broadcast television network owned by Rede Bahia. The network is headquartered at 123 Prof. Aristídes Novis Street in Salvador, Bahia. Rede Bahia is the only statewide television network in Bahia, covering all the 417 cities of the state.

Rede Bahia has six owned-and-operated stations throughout Bahia: TV Bahia in Salvador, TV Oeste in Barreiras, TV Santa Cruz in Itabuna, TV São Francisco in Juazeiro, TV Subaé in Feira de Santana, and TV Sudoeste in Vitória da Conquista.

== History ==
The network began to be formed on March 10, 1985, when it was founded, by entrepreneurs ACM Júnior and César Mata Pires, the TV Bahia in Salvador. The station was affiliated with Rede Manchete from its foundation to January 23, 1987, when it became an Rede Globo affiliate. On November 5, 1988, TV Santa Cruz was inaugurated in Itabuna, being the first television station owned by Rede Bahia in the interior of the state, also affiliated with Rede Globo. TV Sudoeste was the second, being inaugurated on March 31, 1990, in Vitória da Conquista. TV São Francisco signed on in December 1 of the same year in Juazeiro, with the branding TV Norte, and TV Oeste was the last to be founded by the group, wenting on air on February 2, 1991, in Barreiras.

TV Subaé signed on the air on June 1, 1988, at Feira de Santana, being the first Rede Globo-affiliated station in the interior of Bahia, but it was not founded by Rede Bahia. Its founder was the businessman Modesto Cerqueira, and the station was part of Grupo Modesto Cerqueira. It was only in 1998 that the station became part of the statewide network, when the local group sold part of its shares to business partners of Grupo TV Bahia.

On July 2, 1998, the network adopted the nomenclature Rede Bahia de Televisão. The change took place at the same time that the conglomerate was renamed Rede Bahia.

Logo used by the network from 1998 to 2025.

In 2012, the quotas belonging to César Mata Pires in Rede Bahia were sold to the Coutinho Nogueira family, owner of the EP Group, owner of the regional television network based in cities of São Paulo and one city of Minas Gerais, EPTV, also an Globo affiliate.

In 2014, the network was the winner in the category "Biggest Audience" of Rede Globo's National Programming Award, among the participating affiliates of the National Television Panel. It was also one of the three finalists in the categories "Best Calls" (with the call of the match between Juazeirense and Juazeiro) and "Regional Line Programs" (with the local entertainment show Mosaico Baiano).

In May 2019, a process of dismissals was initiated at the network's stations, from journalists to employees, after financial losses suffered by the group in 2018. TV Oeste, from Barreiras, and TV São Francisco, from Juazeiro, stopped the production of local news programs due to the dismissal of employees. On the Juazeiro station, 16 were fired. The stations continued to produce reports for network programs and news bulletins.

On October 25, 2021, TV Oeste reactivated the production of local newscasts through the local edition of Bahia Meio Dia, with a duration of 30 minutes, anchored by Carlos Augusto.

== Stations ==
Station	City of license	Channels (VC / RF)	First air date	ERP	HAAT	Transmitter coordinates	Public license information	Callsign
TV Bahia	Salvador	11; 29 (UHF)	March 10, 1985 (40 years ago)	105 kW	160 m (525 ft)	13°0′12.2″S 38°30′42.4″W	Profile	ZYA298
TV Subaé	Feira de Santana	10; 27 (UHF)	June 1, 1988 (37 years ago)	8,8 kW	85.2 m (280 ft)	12°15′37.8″S 38°57′19.8″W	Profile	ZYA301
TV Santa Cruz	Itabuna	4; 30 (UHF)	November 5, 1988 (37 years ago)	7,6 kW (analog); 10 kW (digital)	76 m (249 ft)	14°46′50.2″S 39°15′43.2″W	Profile (analog); Profile (digital)	ZYA302
TV Sudoeste	Vitória da Conquista	5; 28 (UHF)	March 31, 1990 (35 years ago)	4,5 kW	42 m (138 ft)	14°50′2″S 40°50′52″W	Profile	ZYQ804^{1}
TV São Francisco^{2}	Juazeiro	7; 28 (UHF)	December 1, 1990 (35 years ago)	5,2 kW	82.5 m (271 ft)	9°24′50.5″S 40°30′53.9″W	Profile	ZYQ801^{3}
TV Oeste	Barreiras	5; 29 (UHF)	February 2, 1991 (35 years ago)	4,8 kW (analog); 1,7 kW (digital)	30 m (98 ft)	12°6′8″S 44°59′40″W	Profile (analog); Profile (digital)	ZYP287^{4}

Notes

- ^{1}TV Sudoeste used the callsign ZYA303 from its 1990 sign-on to 2018.
- ^{2}TV São Francisco was branded as TV Norte from its 1990 sign-on to 2001.
- ^{3}TV São Francisco used the callsign ZYA304 from its 1990 sign-on to 2019.
- ^{4}TV Oeste used the callsign ZYA306 from its 1991 sign-on to 2025.

=== Cable and satellite availability ===
Rede Bahia is available in the state of Bahia, utilizing its stations, on cable providers NET, Oi TV, Vivo TV, Atel Telecom and TV Cabo Itabuna, in addition to being available on satellite operators Claro TV, Sky, Oi TV and Vivo TV. Only TV Oeste is not available locally on any of these providers.

== Digital television ==
All the network's stations already officially operates on digital signal. TV Bahia was the first television station in the North/Northeast of Brazil to start digital broadcasting on December 1, 2008. The second O&O station of the network to activate digital broadcasting was TV Subaé, in July 2013, followed by TV Santa Cruz, that started digital operations in December of the same year. The stations TV Oeste and TV Sudoeste started their digital operations in April 2014, while TV São Francisco activated its signal in May, being the last station of the network to activate its digital signal.

== Programs ==
=== News ===
Bahia Agora: News bulletin broadcast during the commercial breaks by TV Oeste (with reports by Alyne Miranda, Carlos Augusto and Gabriel Pires) and TV Sudoeste (anchored by Judson Almeida at morning and Nayla Gusmão at evening), that presents the breaking news from the region.

Bahia Meio Dia: Newscast presented at noon from Monday to Saturday. In Salvador, it is anchored by Jessica Senra and Vanderson Nascimento. It has local editions produced from Monday to Friday by stations TV Oeste, TV Santa Cruz, TV Subaé and TV Sudoeste, anchored by Carlos Augusto, Aracelly Romão, Adilson Muritiba and Judson Almeida, respectively. On Saturdays, the version produced in Salvador by TV Bahia is broadcast statewide.

Bahia Rural: Rural news program aired on Sunday mornings, after Santa Missa em Seu Lar, inspired by the Globo's program Globo Rural. It brings news from the rural area of Bahia, in addition to presenting recipes from rural cuisine. It is presented by Georgina Maynart.

BATV: The network's nightly newscast, broadcast Monday to Saturday and anchored by Fernando Sodake. The program has local versions produced by TV Subaé (anchored by Bruna Evangelho) and TV Sudoeste (anchored by Nayla Gusmão). At TV Santa Cruz (anchored by Roger Sarmento), the first two blocks are produced locally and the third produced by TV Bahia.

Bom Dia Sábado: Newscast aired on Saturday mornings. It is presented on the entire state and anchored by Camila Marinho.

Globo Esporte Bahia: Local edition of Globo's sports news program Globo Esporte, aired statewide from Monday to Saturday, and anchored by Danilo Ribeiro.

Jornal da Manhã: The network's morning newscast, presented statewide from Monday to Friday, and anchored by Camila Oliveira and Ricardo Ishmael.

=== Entertainment ===
Conexão Bahia: Variety program, presented by Luana Souza. Presents content related to culture and tourism in Bahia. It airs on Saturday mornings, after Pequenas Empresas & Grandes Negócios.

Mosaico Baiano: Variety program, presented by Luana Souza. Presents curiosities, clips, documentaries, special series, film tips, theater, concerts, artists, visits to neighborhoods, behavior, tourism, coverage of events in the city of Salvador. It airs on Saturday afternoons, after História de Amor.
