= TV São Francisco =

TV São Francisco (ZYQ801)
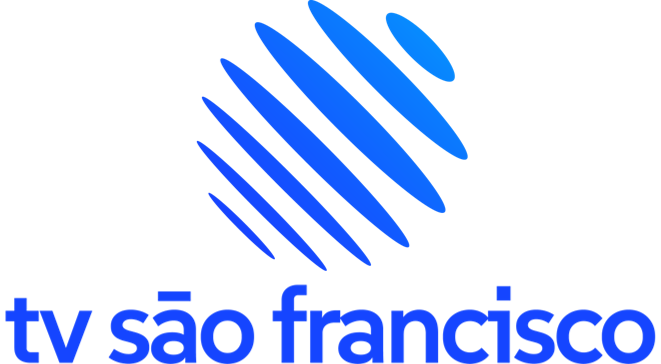

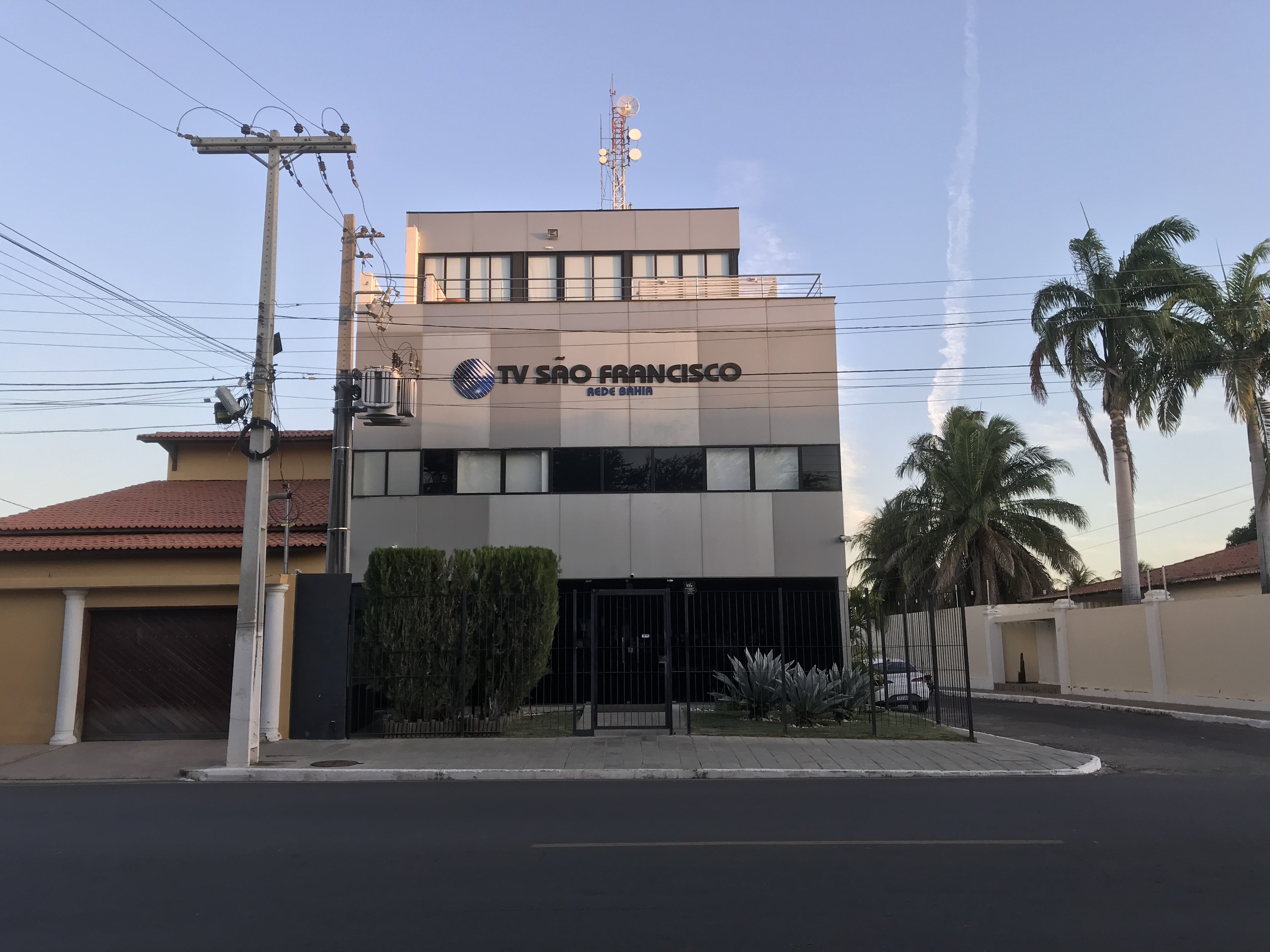
- Juazeiro, Bahia; Brazil
- Channels: Digital: 28 (UHF); Virtual: 7

Programming
- Affiliations: TV Globo

Ownership
- Owner: Rede Bahia; (Televisão Norte Baiano Ltda.)

History
- Founded: March 15, 1988
- First air date: December 1, 1990
- Former call signs: ZYA304 (1990-2019)
- Former names: TV Norte (1990-2001)
- Former channel numbers: Analog: 7 (VHF, 1990–2019)

Technical information
- Licensing authority: ANATEL
- ERP: 1 kW
- HAAT: 82.5 m (271 ft)
- Transmitter coordinates: 9°23′45.2″S 40°30′58.6″W

Links
- Public license information: Profile
- Website: redeglobo.globo.com/redebahia

TV São Francisco (channel 7) is a television station licensed to Juazeiro, Bahia, Brazil and affiliated with TV Globo. Owned by Rede Bahia, TV São Francisco is part of Rede Bahia de Televisão, a statewide television network composed of another five TV stations. TV São Francisco's studios are located at Antonio Carlos Magalhães Avenue in the Maringá district, on Juazeiro, and its transmitter is located in the Palhinhas district, on Petrolina, Pernambuco.

== History ==
The station signed on on December 1, 1990, being the first television station to be inaugurated in Juazeiro and the north region of Bahia, and the third of Rede Bahia to sign on in the interior of the state. Initially, was branded as TV Norte. On the same day, there was an inauguration event on the Juazeiro waterfront, which was even shown on national television on the Rede Globo's entertainment show Domingão do Faustão, through a live entry with the participation of actor Marcos Frota. On December 2, the first local production of TV Norte was aired: a documentary about São Francisco River, anchored by journalist Cláudia Carvalho. In June 1991, the station premiered the local edition of BATV 1ª Edição.

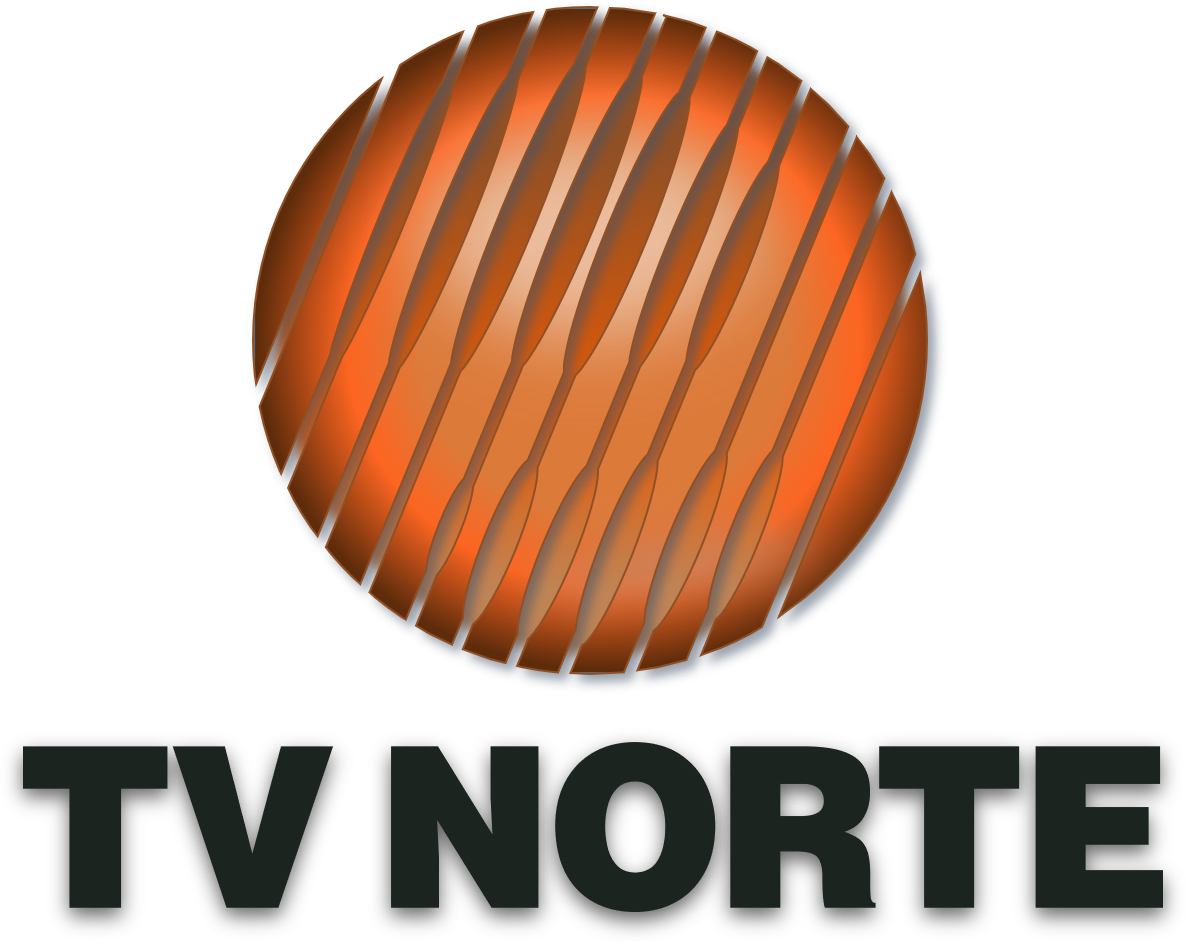
First station's logo, used from 1990 to 1991.

On October 4, 2001, the station was rebranded to TV São Francisco, in honor of the 500th anniversary of the discovery of São Francisco River. On the same day, the newscast Bahia Meio Dia was presented live from a flatboat in the middle of the river, near Ilha do Fogo, on the border between Juazeiro and Petrolina, with tributes and musical performances. In 2002, the station expands its production of newscasts, through the first part of morning newscast Jornal da Manhã.

Logo used by the station from 2001 to 2025.

In 2003, TV São Francisco premiered Tema, a journalistic program dedicated to a different theme in each edition. The program was presented by journalist Sibelle Fonseca, who also produced reports for the attraction, and was broadcast on Saturdays, after Jornal Hoje. It was shown until June 25, 2005, being replaced the following Saturday by TV Bahia's sports program Bahia Esporte.

In May 2004, TV São Francisco opened a branch office in the city of Irecê.

On January 12, 2015, TV São Francisco inaugurate its new headquarters in Juazeiro. With this, the station now has more modern equipment, broadcasting its local programming in high definition, in addition to a new studio and set. It was the first station in the interior of Bahia and among the stations of Rede Bahia de Televisão in the interior of Bahia to broadcast local programming in high definition. In March, however, the station fired 5 employees, including journalists and the news manager, and stopped producing the local news blocks in the noon news program Bahia Meio Dia, maintaining only the local editions of the newscasts Jornal da Manhã and BATV.

On May 6, 2019, Rede Bahia announced the interruption of the station's newscast production activities due to cost cuts, taking away from the schedule the local news blocks of Jornal da Manhã and BATV (the station began to rebroadcast the versions produced by TV Bahia, in Salvador). 16 employees were laid-off. The station began to produce the news update bulettins Bahia Agora, broadcast during the programming, and continued to produce live participations and reports for Rede Bahia and Rede Globo news programs.

On September 28, 2020, the station fired 9 employees, from the administrative, technical and master coordination sectors, from where the station's local commercials are broadcast. The last sector is now coordinated directly from Salvador, in an automated way.

On September 15, 2022, TV São Francisco announced the resumption of local newscast production after three years of interruption, through the return of the local edition of Bahia Meio Dia, suspended in March 2015. The debut occurred on October 18, in an edition anchored by Joyce Guirra.

== Digital television ==
=== Digital channels ===
The station's digital signal is multiplexed:

Channel	Video	Aspect	Short name	Programming
7.1	1080i	16:9	TV SAO FRANCISCO HD	Main TV São Francisco programming / TV Globo
7.2	1080i	16:9	TV ESCOLA JUAZEIRO	TV Escola Juazeiro

=== Analog-to-digital conversion ===
TV São Francisco launched its digital signal on May 14, 2014. The launch was at a special event attended by Rede Bahia shareholders, customers, authorities and representatives of the local press. With the transition, the station changed its call sign from ZYA 304, used since its inaugural sign on in 1990, to ZYQ 801.

TV São Francisco shut down its analog signal, over VHF channel 7, on January 9, 2019, as part of the federally mandated transition from analog to digital television. The station's digital signal remains on its pre-transition UHF channel 28, using virtual channel 7.

On November 3, 2021, TV São Francisco officially activated its sub-channel 7.2, with the branding TV Escola Juazeiro, for transmission of classes from the Municipal Education Network of Juazeiro. The project had been presented by the Department of Education and Youth of the Municipality of Juazeiro on October 22.

== News operation ==
TV São Francisco currently broadcasts 5 hours of locally produced newscasts each week (with 40 minutes each weekday, through the local edition of noon newscast Bahia Meio Dia, anchored by Joyce Guirra). The station formerly produced the local editions of newscasts Bahia Agora, BATV and Jornal da Manhã, and the journalistic Norte Rural, with informations about agrobusiness and the rural area from the region of San Francisco Valley.

== Notable on-air staff ==
=== Former ===
- Pâmela Bório

== See also ==
- Rede Bahia de Televisão
- TV Globo
