= TV Sudoeste =

TV Sudoeste (ZYQ804)
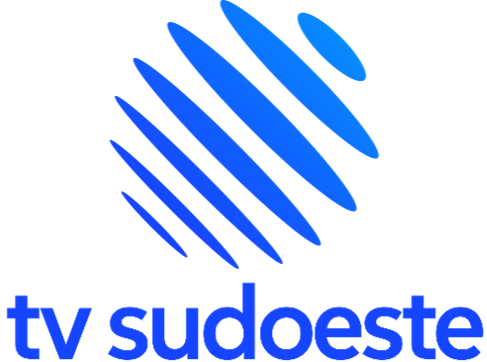
- Vitória da Conquista, Bahia; Brazil
- Channels: Digital: 28 (UHF); Virtual: 5

Programming
- Affiliations: TV Globo

Ownership
- Owner: Rede Bahia; (Televisão Conquista Ltda.)

History
- Founded: March 11, 1988
- First air date: March 31, 1990
- Former call signs: ZYA303 (1990–2018)
- Former channel numbers: Analog: 5 (VHF, 1990–2018)

Technical information
- Licensing authority: ANATEL
- ERP: 1 kW
- HAAT: 42 m (138 ft)
- Transmitter coordinates: 14°50′01.1″S 40°50′53.0″W

Links
- Public license information: Profile
- Website: redeglobo.globo.com/redebahia

TV Sudoeste, virtual channel 5 (UHF digital channel 28), is a TV Globo-affiliated television station licensed to Vitória da Conquista, Bahia, Brazil. Owned by Rede Bahia, TV Sudoeste is part of Rede Bahia de Televisão, a statewide television network composed of another five TV stations. TV Sudoeste's studios are located on Fonsecas's Street, in the center of Vitória da Conquista, and its transmitter is located at Santa Ana Street, in the Nossa Senhora Aparecida District.

== History ==
TV Sudoeste was inaugurated on March 31, 1990, and signed on officially on April 1, with a special debut program about the southeast region of Bahia, talking about economy, culture and society, presented by Luís Quadros, first anchor to appear on the station's programming. On the same day, there was the arrival, in Vitória da Conquista, of "Caminhão do Faustão", attraction of the Globo's show Domingão do Faustão, that rewarded viewers who sent letters to the program's team. The first local newscast broadcast by TV Sudoeste was the local news block of BATV, anchored by Luís Quadros, on April 2.

The first team of TV Sudoeste was formed by 30 professionals, who before joining the new station, had a period of experience at TV Santa Cruz in Itabuna, the first station of Grupo TV Bahia in the interior of the state, inaugurated in 1988. The first news director was Silvia Gabionetta.

In 1991, the station premiered the local variety show Somos Nós (created on TV Santa Cruz), with interviews and debates on important issues in the region. Was broadcast right after Globo's national newscast Jornal Hoje. As of 2000, in addition to the southwest region, the program was also presented in Salvador, capital of the state, through TV Salvador (channel 28), an independent station that also belonged to Rede Bahia. The attraction was broadcast until June 25, 2005, being replaced the following Saturday by TV Bahia's Bahia Esporte, a sports news program. Its last host was Aureni de Almeida.

Logo used by the station from 1998 to 2025.

In 2005, it began to produce together with iContent (a Rede Bahia entertainment company), the Bahia Winter Festival, which occurs at the Vitória da Conquista Exhibition Park every year on the last weekend of August, bringing important names from the national music scene to the city.

On May 10, 2021, TV Sudoeste premiered the complete local edition of Bahia Meio Dia, also introducing changes in its studios and set.

== Digital television ==
=== Digital channels ===
Channel	Video	Aspect	Short name	Programming
5.1	1080i	16:9	TV SUDOESTE	Main TV Sudoeste programming / TV Globo

=== Analog-to-digital conversion ===
TV Sudoeste was the fourth Rede Bahia station to began transmitting in digital signal, starting operations in an experimental phase on April 1, 2014. The signal was officially launched on April 29, with an event at Mira Flores Arena for businessmen and technicians from Vitória da Conquista and other regions of Bahia.

In 2014, it activated the digital signal in translators of the largest cities in the region, Jequié, Itapetinga, Guanambi, Caetité and Brumado, in the first phase of the expansion of the digital signal. In the second phase, in 2015, the digital signal was activated in translators of Barra do Choça, Jaguaquara, Itambé, Bahia, Ipiaú, Anagé and Poções.

On August 18, 2015, TV Sudoeste's newscasts started to be produced in high definition (HDTV).

TV Sudoeste shut down its analog signal, over VHF channel 5, on December 5, 2018, as part of the federally mandated transition from analog to digital television. The station's digital signal remains on its pre-transition UHF channel 28, using virtual channel 5.

== News operation ==
TV Sudoeste currently broadcasts 8 hours and 20 minutes of locally produced newscasts each week (with 1 hour and 40 minutes each weekday, through the local editions of newscasts Bahia Meio Dia and BATV, anchored by Judson Almeida and Nayla Gusmão, respectively). The station formerly produced the local editions of newscasts Bahia Agora, BATV 1ª Edição and Jornal da Manhã.

== See also ==
- Rede Bahia de Televisão
- TV Globo
