= EPTV Sul de Minas =

EPTV Sul de Minas (ZYA 732)
- Varginha, Minas Gerais; Brazil
- Channels: Digital: 42 (UHF); Virtual: 5

Programming
- Affiliations: TV Globo

Ownership
- Owner: Grupo EP; (Televisão Sul de Minas Ltda.)

History
- Founded: August 8, 1988
- Former call signs: Analog: 5 (VHF, 1988-2025)
- Former names: TV Sul de Minas (1988-1989)

Technical information
- Licensing authority: ANATEL
- ERP: 5 kW
- Transmitter coordinates: 21°33′37.4″S 45°26′24.3″W

Links
- Public license information: Profile
- Website: redeglobo.globo.com/sp/eptv

EPTV Sul de Minas (channel 5) is a television station in Varginha, Minas Gerais, Brazil, affiliated with TV Globo, member of EPTV and owned by Grupo EP. EPTV Sul de Minas' studios and transmitter are located on Professora Helena Reis Street, in the downtown of the city.

== History ==
The station started broadcasting on August 8, 1988. The first local program seen was the local edition of MGTV (which in 1999 was replaced by Jornal Regional, aligning itself with the EPTV stations in São Paulo) presented by Ronaldo Trombini. In an initial phase, the station covered about 100 cities, with an estimated reach of two million people. When São Carlos joined the stations, the group was renamed EPTV.

== Digital television ==
Channel	Video	Aspect	Programming
5.1	42 UHF	1080i	Main EPTV Sul de Minas programming / TV Globo

On February 25, 2010, the minister of the communications Hélio Costa was to Varginha to sign the permission to implantation of the digital signal in the city. EPTV Sul de Minas was the last of the four stations of EPTV to start its digital transmissions, initially over UHF channel 31. Just before ending the test phase, the station migrated to UHF channel 42.

The official launching occurred in June 8, at 12:15 pm, during Jornal da EPTV, in a ceremony that had the presence of the directors of the station, of the mayor of Varginha, Eduardo Corujinha, and of a representant of the city hall of Poços de Caldas. The station passed to produce its programs in high-definition on April 2, 2012. Among the stations of EPTV, it also was the last to receive this change.

=== Transition to digital signal ===
The station turned off its analog signal, over VHF channel 5, on June 30, 2025, following ANATEL's official schedule.
