= Rede Bahia =

- Logo used since 2025
- Formerly: Grupo TV Bahia (1985–1998)
- Type: Privately held company
- Genre: Media; Content; Entertainment
- Founded: 5 August 1975; 50 years ago
- Founder: Antônio Carlos Magalhães
- Headquarters: Salvador, Bahia, Brazil
- Key people: Marcos Machado (chairman)
- Products: Television; Radio; Newspaper; Internet
- Number of employees: 1,100 (2012)
- Website: redebahia.com.br

Logo used from 2001 to 2025.

Rede Bahia is a business conglomerate based in Salvador, Bahia, Brazil, founded by the Magalhães family. Although primarily known as a media conglomerate in Bahia, it operates both within and outside the state across various sectors and began in the construction industry with Santa Helena Construtora.

In the telecommunications sector, the group controls a regional network of six television broadcast stations with coverage in all municipalities in the state, making it the first television network to cover the entire state of Bahia. It also operates four radio stations, a daily newspaper, and three digital portals, totaling 14 media outlets. Additionally, the group includes Bahia Eventos, a content and entertainment company that organizes events such as the Salvador Summer Festival, the Bahia Winter Festival, and the International Literary Festival of Cachoeira (FLICA).

== History ==
=== Early days ===
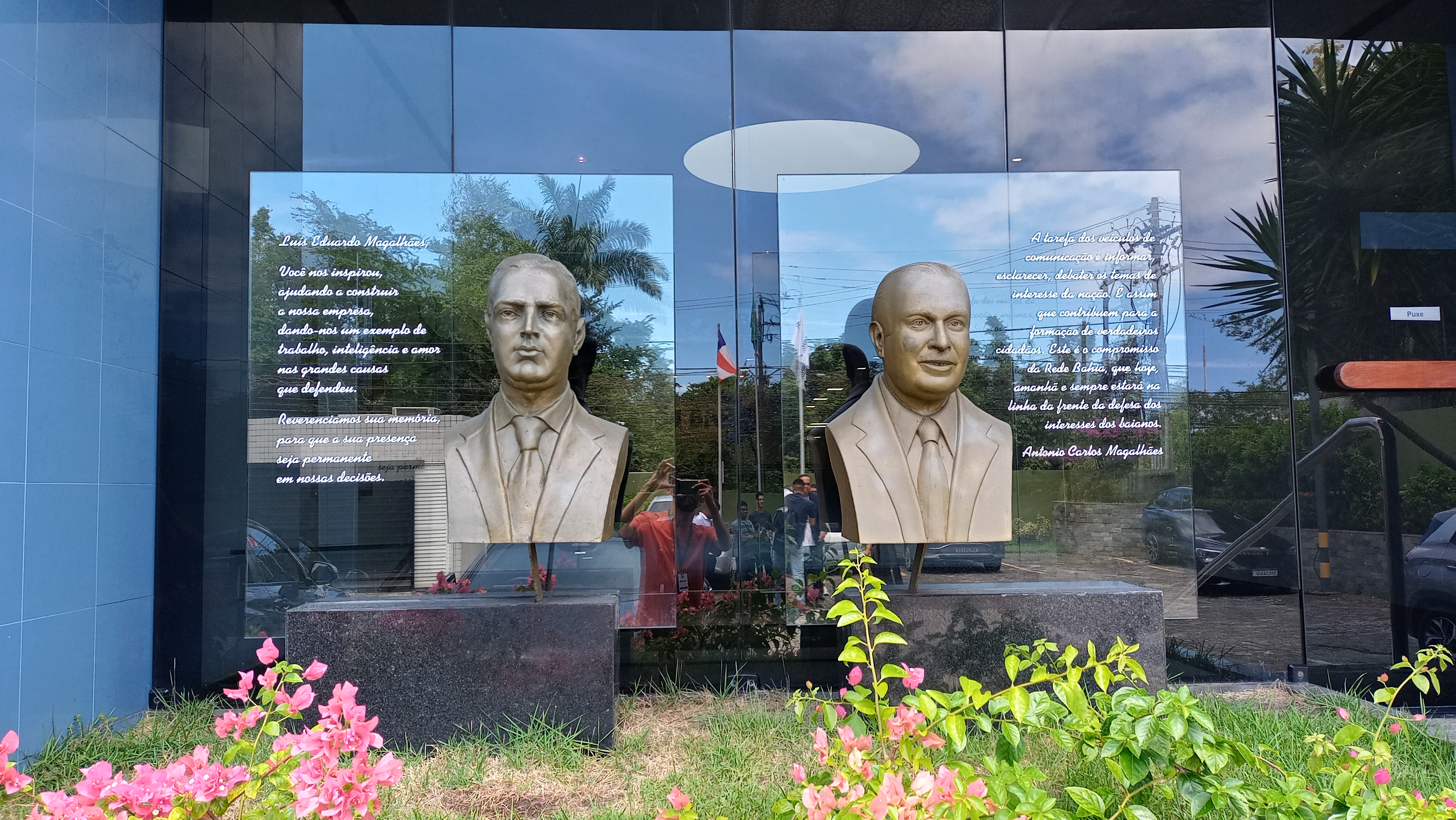
Busts of Luís Eduardo Magalhães and Antônio Carlos Magalhães on the facade of the group's headquarters, inaugurated in 2009.

The conglomerate began with the founding of Santa Helena Construtora on 5 August 1975 by Bahian politician Antônio Carlos Magalhães. Its activities were focused on the market for developments aimed at middle-income and high-income audiences. Three years later, on 20 December 1978, the company expanded into the communications sector with the establishment of the newspaper then called Correio da Bahia. With the founding of the newspaper, Gráfica Santa Helena, the printing company responsible for producing Correio, was also established. The company was closed in 2007, but the infrastructure for printing the newspaper was retained.

=== Television ===
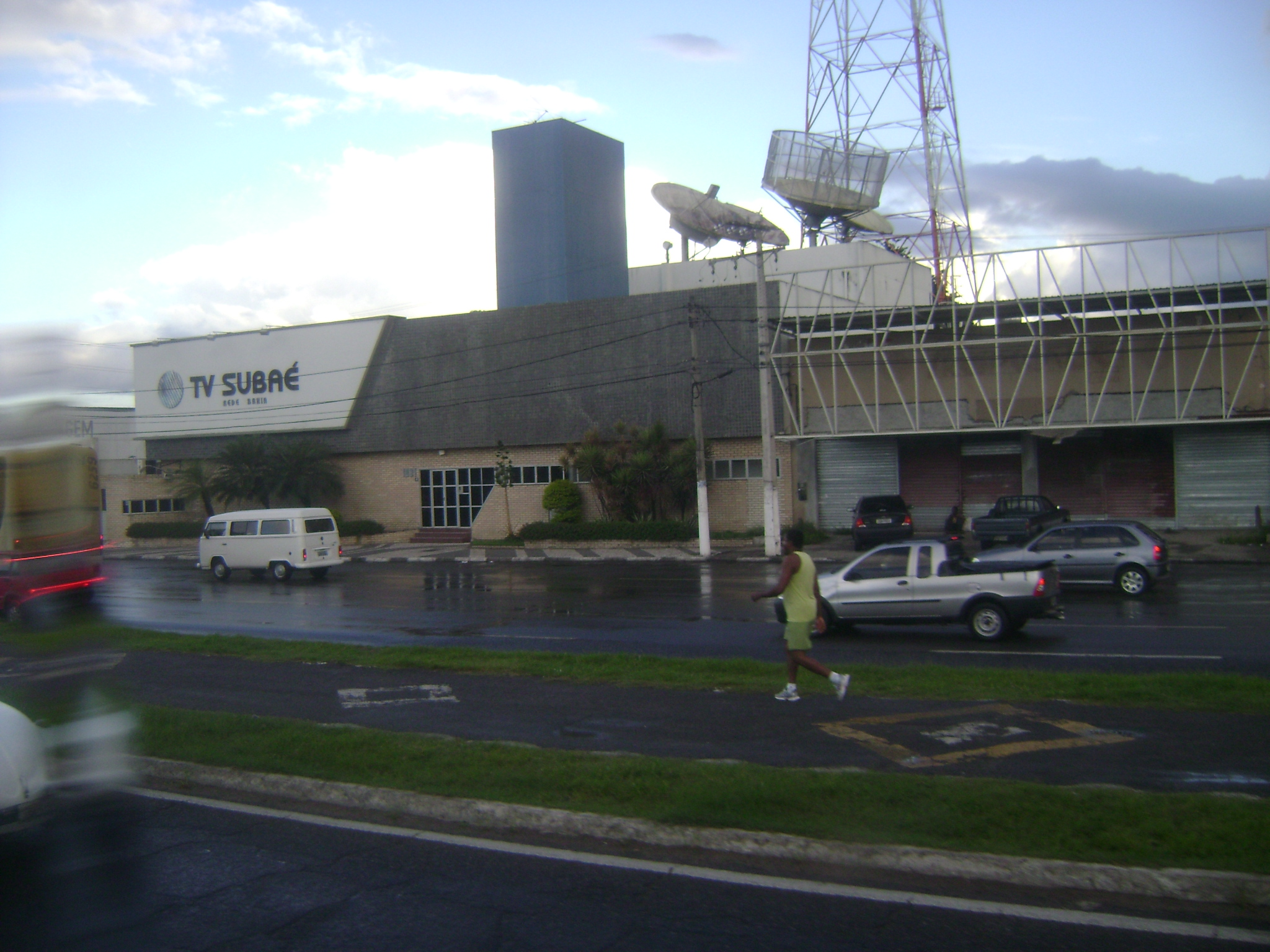
Headquarters of TV Subaé, on Avenida Presidente Dutra, in Feira de Santana

On 10 March 1985, TV Bahia was inaugurated by entrepreneurs ACM Júnior and César Mata Pires. The station, based in Salvador, was initially affiliated with Rede Manchete, and from 23 January 1987, with Rede Globo. Subsequently, the formation of a television network began in strategically located cities across the state. On 5 November 1988, TV Santa Cruz was inaugurated in Itabuna, becoming the group's first television station in the interior of the state, also affiliated with Rede Globo.

TV Sudoeste was the second, inaugurated on 31 March 1990 in Vitória da Conquista. TV São Francisco went on air on 1 December of the same year in Juazeiro, initially called TV Norte, and TV Oeste was the last to be founded by the then Grupo TV Bahia, going on air on 2 February 1991 in Barreiras.

TV Subaé, based in Feira de Santana, went on air on 1 June 1988, becoming the first Rede Globo affiliate in the interior of Bahia, but it was not founded by Rede Bahia. Its founder was Feira de Santana businessman Modesto Cerqueira, and it belonged to the Grupo Modesto Cerqueira. It was only in April 1998 that the station became part of the network, when the Feira de Santana group sold part of its shares to partners of the TV Bahia group.

In the same year, on 2 July, the network officially became known as Rede Bahia de Televisão, while the media group adopted the name Rede Bahia. On 31 December 2000, TV Salvador was inaugurated, an independent station with its own local programming and content produced by Rede Bahia de Televisão stations.

=== Radio ===
The group entered the radio business through GFM, a radio station based in Salvador and founded on 20 July 1988 as Globo FM. On 1 December 1995, Bahia FM Sul was founded in Itabuna, with a format similar to its sister station in Salvador and the name 102.1 FM Sul. In 2001, the Rede Tropical Sat was founded, a statewide network of radio stations. The network grew to include 19 affiliates. In Salvador, it broadcast its programming through the station operating on the 92.3 FM frequency, now Salvador FM. The network was discontinued on 31 December 2005, as preparations were underway for the launch of the also popular Bahia FM, which occurred on 1 January 2007. On 19 March 2010, the group's last radio station, Jovem Pan FM Salvador, was created, initially as CBN Salvador, affiliated with the CBN network.

=== Other ventures ===
Rede Bahia was composed of several other companies, such as Bahia Cinema e Vídeo (an audiovisual production company), Bahia Edições Musicais (a music publishing company), Bahia Discos (a record label), MMDS Bahia (a cable TV provider, representing NET in the state), Pronto Call Center (a telemarketing company), Pronto Express (a distribution company), Pronto Logística (a logistics company), and iLimit (a website development company). The group also maintained the Universidade Corporativa da Rede Bahia (Uniredebahia), a corporate university founded on 19 August 2001, the first of its kind in the North-Northeast regions of Brazil, focused on competency management. It was discontinued in March 2010.

=== Sales ===
The São Paulo-based group Empresas Pioneiras, headquartered in Campinas and owner of Emissoras Pioneiras de Televisão (EPTV), purchased one-third of Rede Bahia's shares (belonging to César Mata Pires) in June 2012. Earlier that year, in March, the sale of TV Salvador to an evangelical business group had been confirmed, and one year later, on 5 March 2013, the station officially ended its programming following the completion of the sale. In May 2013, the sale of MMDS Bahia to Galaxy Brasil was finalized, a company indirectly controlled by Sky Brasil, due to the prohibition of simultaneous control of a broadcasting station and a cable TV operator in Brazil.
