= TV Subaé =

TV Subaé (ZYA301)
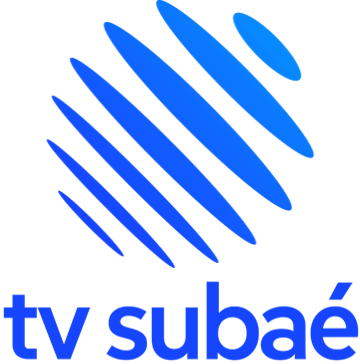

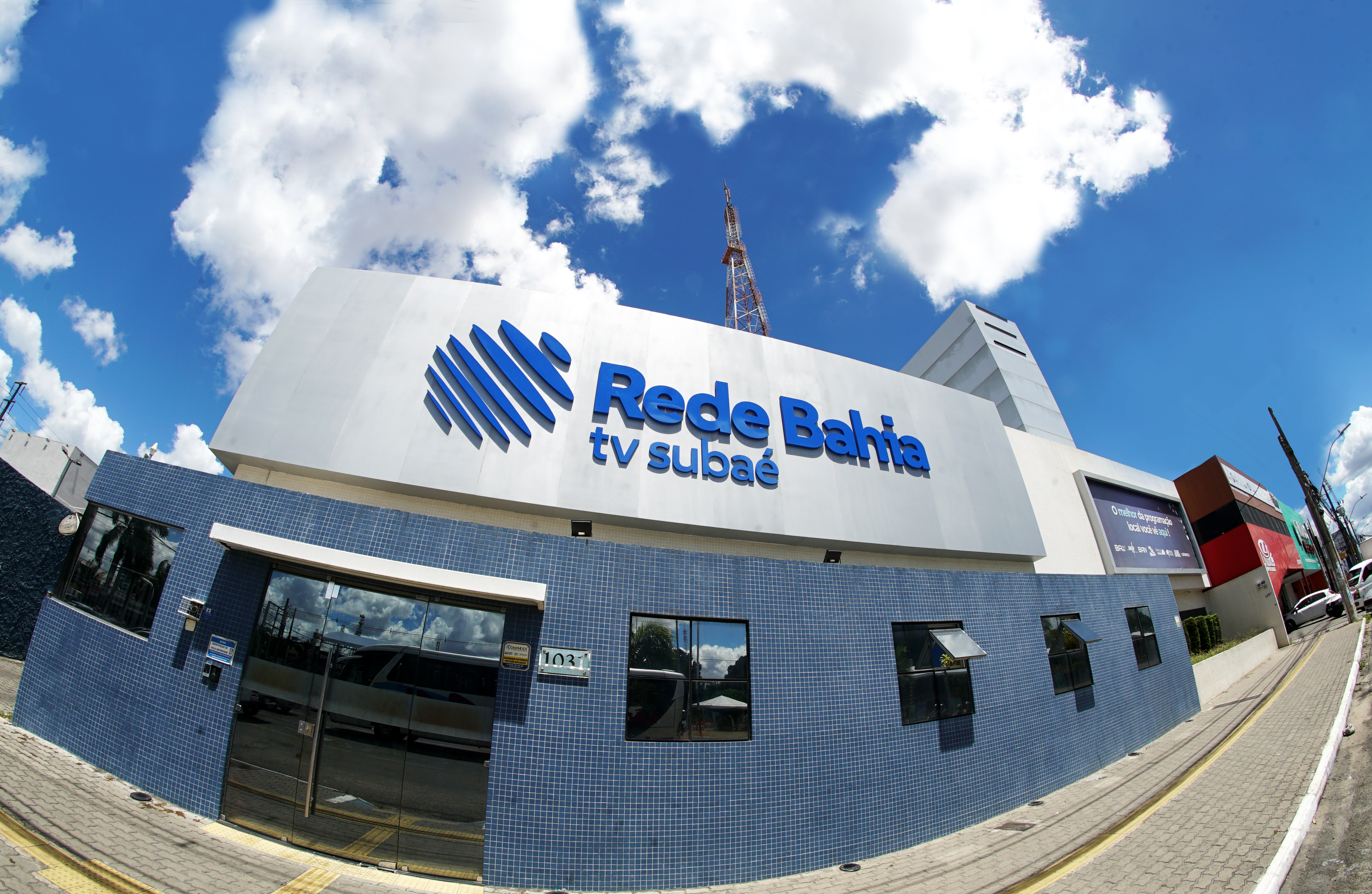
- Feira de Santana, Bahia; Brazil
- Channels: Digital: 27 (UHF); Virtual: 10

Programming
- Affiliations: TV Globo

Ownership
- Owner: Grupo Modesto Cerqueira Rede Bahia; (TV Subaé Ltda.)

History
- Founded: July 14, 1975
- First air date: June 1, 1988
- Former channel numbers: Analog: 10 (VHF, 1988–2018)

Technical information
- Licensing authority: ANATEL
- ERP: 1,8 kW
- HAAT: 85 m (279 ft)
- Transmitter coordinates: 12°15′37.8″S 38°57′19.8″W

Links
- Public license information: Profile
- Website: redeglobo.globo.com/redebahia

TV Subaé (channel 10) is a television station licensed to Feira de Santana, Bahia, Brazil affiliated with TV Globo. Owned by Grupo Modesto Cerqueira and Rede Bahia, TV Subaé is a owned-and-operated station of Rede Bahia de Televisão, a statewide television network composed of another five TV stations. TV Subaé's studios and transmitter are located on Presidente Dutra Avenue, in the center of Feira de Santana.

== History ==
TV Subaé was inaugurated on June 1, 1988, by businessman Modesto Cerqueira, being the first Rede Globo affiliate in the interior of the state. The structure to start the operations was made by the defunct Rede Globo Affiliate Implementation Nucleus. TV Subaé also had the sister radio stations the Subaé AM and Nordeste FM, which formed, together with the TV station and the journal Jornal Feira Hoje, the subsidiary Rede Baiana de Comunicação (also called RBC), owned by Grupo MC. The inauguration was attended by several authorities, including the then mayor José Falcão da Silva and the then governor João Durval Carneiro.

Through the center, some professionals from Minas Gerais and São Paulo came to implement the station, among them, Sílvio Palma, who was the first director of journalism; Marcos Pizano, text editor (he came from TV Leste, then affiliated with Rede Globo in Governador Valadares); João Aldemir Venceslau, text editor (he also came from TV Leste, and was also part of the implementation team of TV Santa Cruz, in Itabuna); Ciro Porto, reporter (from EPTV); Aline Hungria, reporter (from TV Globo São Paulo); Ferreira, operations manager (also from TV Globo São Paulo), among other professionals in the areas of technical and commercial operations, programming and engineering.

In 1994, Modesto Cerqueira, founder and owner of TV Subaé, died. The station and the other Grupo MC subsidiaries are now controlled by his sons Modezil and Florisberto Cerqueira.

In April 1998, Grupo MC sold 50% of its share of TV Subaé to Grupo TV Bahia. With that, the station officially became a member of the statewide network Rede Bahia de Televisão.

Logo used by the station from 1998 to 2025.

On February 7, 2020, TV Subaé programming is included in the pay TV provider SKY, replacing TV Bahia, on channel 12. The official launch occurred on February 12, through an event at the Hotel Ibis in Feira de Santana.

On April 22, 2021, veteran journalist Lete Simões, who had been working at TV Subaé for 22 years, was fired from the station. Due to health problems caused by stress, she had been working from home since the beginning of the COVID-19 pandemic, having returned to anchor the nightly newscast BATV a few times in 2021.

== Digital television ==
=== Digital channels ===
Channel	Video	Aspect	Short name	Programming
10.1	1080i	16:9	TV SUBAE	Main TV Subaé programming / TV Globo

=== Analog-to-digital conversion ===
On March 18, 2013, the physical channel 27 UHF was assigned for the TV Subaé's digital signal operations in Feira de Santana. On June 13, the station's digital signal went on air on an experimental basis, making the broadcasts official on July 18, 2013, with a big event. A new generator, a new editing room, and new equipment for transmitting the broadcaster's digital signal were deployed.

On June 4, 2014, the station activated its digital translator at the city of Alagoinhas, and in May 3, in Serrinha.

In May 2018, TV Subaé activated a digital translator station in the municipality of Conceição do Almeida, through channel 45 UHF. On June 15, 2019, this station extended its coverage to the city of Santo Antônio de Jesus.

TV Subaé shut down its analog signal, over VHF channel 10, on December 5, 2018, as part of the federally mandated transition from analog to digital television. The station's digital signal remains on its pre-transition UHF channel 27, using virtual channel 10.

On July 2, 2021, TV Subaé officially activated subchannels 10.2 and 10.3, branded as Caminhos da Educação, for the exhibition of classes from the municipal education network of Feira de Santana.

== News operation ==
TV Subaé currently broadcasts 6 hours and 5 minutes of locally produced newscasts each week (with 1 hour and 13 minutes each weekday, through the local editions of newscasts Bahia Meio Dia and BATV, anchored by Adilson Muritiba and Heitor Figueiredo, respectively). The station formerly produced the local editions of newscasts Bahia Agora and Jornal da Manhã, in addition to the local-produced edition of the Sundays nightly newsmagazine program Rede Bahia Revista.

== See also ==
- Rede Bahia de Televisão
- TV Globo
