= TV Oeste =

TV Oeste (ZYP287)
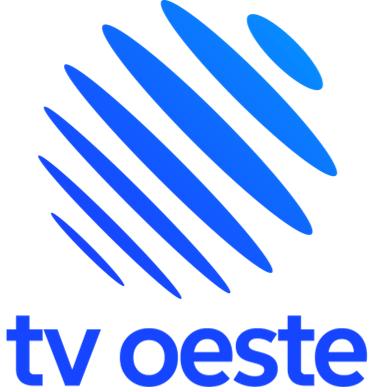
- Barreiras, Bahia; Brazil
- Channels: Digital: 29 (UHF); Virtual: 5

Programming
- Affiliations: TV Globo

Ownership
- Owner: Rede Bahia; (Televisão Oeste Baiano Ltda.)

History
- Founded: November 30, 1987
- First air date: February 2, 1991
- Former call signs: ZYA306 (1991-2025)
- Former channel numbers: 5 (VHF, 1991-2025)

Technical information
- Licensing authority: ANATEL
- ERP: 4.8 kW (analog); 0,9 kW (digital)
- HAAT: 30 m (98 ft)
- Transmitter coordinates: 12°6′8″S 44°59′40″W

Links
- Public license information: Profile
- Website: redeglobo.globo.com/redebahia

TV Oeste (channel 5) is a television station licensed to Barreiras, Bahia, Brazil, affiliated with TV Globo. Owned by Rede Bahia, TV Oeste is part of Rede Bahia de Televisão, a statewide television network composed of another five TV stations. TV Oeste's studios are located on Marechal Deodoro Street in the Vila Brasil district, on Barreiras, and its transmitter is located atop Serra da Bandeira.

== History ==
TV Oeste signed on for the first time on February 2, 1991. It was the first television station to be inaugurated in Barreiras and the western region of Bahia, being too the last Rede Bahia station to sign on. The first anchor to appear on the station's programming was journalist Denise Mesquita, who anchored a special inaugural program about the western region of Bahia.

Logo used by the station from 1998 to 2025.

In 2004, TV Oeste installed regional offices in the cities of Luís Eduardo Magalhães and Bom Jesus da Lapa, expanding journalistic coverage and business possibilities in important centers of its coverage area.

In February 2010, the station had its license renewed for more 15 years.

On February 3, 2012, the headquarters of TV Oeste was targeted by vandals. The criminals, who had carried out acts of vandalism in various establishments, such as banks and stores, shoted at the station's frontage and entrance door. The crime occurred shortly after the Association of Military Police of the West of Bahia joined the strike of the Military Police of Bahia.

On May 23, 2014, TV Oeste opened a new branch in Luís Eduardo Magalhães, in a ceremony that was attended by authorities and had live entries by reporter Carlos Augusto on the local edition of newscast BATV.

On March 2, 2015, TV Oeste produced for the last time the Bahia Meio Dia regional news block.

On May 6, 2019, Rede Bahia announced the interruption of the station's newscast production activities, taking down the regional versions of the local newscasts Jornal da Manhã and BATV, causing TV Oeste to fully broadcast the newscasts produced by TV Bahia in Salvador. Many employees were fired, with only the technical marketing team, some cameramen and reporters being retained. The station continued to produce reports for state and nationalwide newscasts and maintained commercial breaks as usual, in addition to producing local editions of the news update bulletin Bahia Agora.

On January 16, 2021, TV Oeste premiered the local version of the local infomercial program Oferta na Rede, created by TV Bahia, with the presentation of Tássia Peixoto. On August 21, another special local program debuts on the station: Oeste Agora, with the presentation of Victor Silveira, which in its 3 editions, broadcast after Mosaico Baiano, had as theme the real estate sector in the region.

On October 13, 2021, the station officially announces the resume of local newscasts production after two years, through the return of the local edition of Bahia Meio Dia, anchored by Carlos Augusto. The premiere happened on October 25.

In the first half of 2024, according to Kantar Ibope Media, TV Oeste was the absolute audience leader in Barreiras and its region, with 19.03 rating points and a 56.6% share. The station reached more than 580,000 people and was present in 78% of households in its coverage area.

== Digital television ==
=== Digital channels ===
Channel	Video	Aspect	Short name	Programming
5.1	1080i	16:9	TV OESTE	Main TV Oeste programming / TV Globo

=== Analog-to-digital conversion ===
The station activated its digital signal in April 2014 and officially launched it on May 20, in an event with the presence of the board of Rede Bahia and more than 400 guests.

TV Oeste planned to shut down its analog signal, over VHF channel 5, on December 31, 2023, following ANATEL's official schedule, as part of the federally mandated transition from analog to digital television. However, the transition was later delayed indefinitely.

== News operation ==
TV Oeste currently broadcasts 5 hours of locally produced newscasts each week (with 40 minutes each weekday, through the local edition of noon newscast Bahia Meio Dia, anchored by Carlos Augusto), in addition to the news update bulletin Bahia Agora, with reports by Alyne Miranda, Carlos Augusto and Gabriel Pires. The station formerly produced the local editions of newscasts BATV and Jornal da Manhã.

== See also ==
- Rede Bahia de Televisão
- TV Globo
