= SKY Latin America =

SKY Latin America may refer to:

- Sky México, a subsidiary of Televisa and Vrio
- SKY Brasil, a subsidiary of Vrio
