= EPTV Central =

EPTV Central (ZYB 870)
São Carlos, São Paulo; Brazil
- Channels: Digital: 25 (UHF); Virtual: 6

Programming
- Affiliations: TV Globo

Ownership
- Owner: Grupo EP; (Empresa Paulista de Televisão S/A)

History
- First air date: July 1, 1989
- Former names: TV Central (1989)
- Former channel numbers: Analog: 6 (VHF, 1991-2018); Digital: 42 (UHF, 2009-2018)

Technical information
- Licensing authority: ANATEL
- ERP: 2.5 kW
- Transmitter coordinates: 22°01′56.8″S 47°52′52.5″W

Links
- Public license information: Profile
- Website: redeglobo.globo.com/sp/eptv

EPTV Central (channel 6) is a television station in São Carlos, São Paulo, Brazil, affiliated with TV Globo, member of EPTV and owned by Grupo EP. EPTV Central's studios and transmitter are located on Mário Luchesi Street, in the Jardim São Paulo district. Initially the station was a relay of TV Ribeirão from its launch until January 25, 1991 when it opened its studios and began producing local programming.

== History ==
The station started broadcasting on July 1, 1989, becoming the fourth station owned by EPTV and coinciding with the adoption of the name on the stations. Initially, it relayed EPTV Ribeirão's local output, however the stabilization enabled EPTV Central to begin producing its own programming starting in 1991.

== Digital television ==
Channel	Video	Aspect	Programming
6.1	25 UHF	1080i	Main EPTV Central programming / TV Globo

EPTV Central started the tests to implantation of its digital signal in February 2009, over UHF channel 42, and only sixteen months later, on May 31, 2010, the digital signal was officially launched to São Carlos and Araraquara. On December 7, 2018, the station moved its physical from UHF 42 to 25.

=== Transition to digital signal ===
The station turned off its analog signal, over VHF channel 6, on December 12, 2018, as part of the federally mandated transition from analog to digital television.

== Controversies ==
On May 30, 2018, during the coverage of the truck drivers strike, a tema of the station that marked images of the Anhanguera Highway in Leme, was attacked by manifestants that participated of the movement. Few later of a live entrance to Jornal da EPTV 1ª Edição, the film reporter Marlon Tavoni and the external assistant Janesi Rigo were attacked. The reporter Patrícia Moser got to escape and trigger the Military Highway Police, that arrived to the local in five minutes. The two attacked were helped by Intervias, concessionary of the road. The incident was repudiated by many press associations and syndicates.
