= EPTV Ribeirão =

EPTV Ribeirão (ZYB 860)
- Ribeirão Preto, São Paulo; Brazil
- Channels: Digital: 25 (UHF); Virtual: 7

Programming
- Affiliations: TV Globo

Ownership
- Owner: Grupo EP; (Empresa Paulista de Televisão S/A)

History
- First air date: November 12, 1980
- Former names: TV Ribeirão (1980-1989)
- Former channel numbers: Analog: 7 (VHF, 1980-2018); Digital: 42 (UHF, 2009-2018)

Technical information
- Licensing authority: ANATEL
- ERP: 9 kW
- Transmitter coordinates: 21°09′10.8″S 47°49′48.8″W

Links
- Public license information: Profile
- Website: redeglobo.globo.com/sp/eptv

EPTV Ribeirão (channel 7) is a television station in Ribeirão Preto, São Paulo, Brazil, affiliated with TV Globo, member of EPTV and owned by Grupo EP. EPTV Ribeirão's studios are located on Javari Street, in the Ipiranga district, and its transmitter is located in the Alto do Ipiranga district. The station received its construction permit alongside the head station in Campinas in the mid-1970s and started broadcasting in 1980.

== Digital television ==
Channel	Video	Aspect	Programming
7.1	25 UHF	1080i	Main EPTV Ribeirão programming / TV Globo

EPTV Ribeirão started its transmissions in experimental character on January 27, 2009, over UHF channel 42. The official launching occurred only in October 1, during Jornal da EPTV, in the same date that EPTV celebrated 30 years of foundation.

=== Transition to digital signal ===
The station turned off its analog signal, over VHF channel 12, on January 17, 2018, as part of the federally mandated transition from analog to digital television. After switching off, EPTV Ribeirão changed its physical channel, from UHF 42 to 25.
