= Correio (Bahia) =

Brazilian daily newspaper

- Type: Daily newspaper
- Format: Berliner
- Founder: Antônio Carlos Magalhães
- Publisher: Rede Bahia
- Founded: 20 December 1978; 47 years ago
- Headquarters: Salvador, Bahia, Brazil
- Circulation: 32,568
- Website: www.correio24horas.com.br

Correio (Note: Also stylized as CORREIO, Correio*, or CORREIO*.) (formerly Correio da Bahia, though it is still occasionally referred to by this name) is a daily newspaper circulating in the Brazilian state of Bahia. Correio is part of Rede Bahia, a media conglomerate based in Bahia. In the digital space, the newspaper operates the Correio 24 Horas portal, a free-access platform composed of blogs and posts by columnists, articles, and reports, following the same editorial line as the print version of the newspaper. It is the leading newspaper in Bahia in terms of audience, ranking first in both digital access and print circulation.

== History ==
Correio da Bahia was founded on 20 December 1978 by Antônio Carlos Magalhães, with Sérgio Tonielo, as its first editor-in-chief, and began circulation on 15 January 1979. Before the creation of the newspaper, ACM had attempted, alongside another group, to purchase Jornal da Bahia, without success.

On 7 May 2000, the newspaper began circulating on Sundays and introduced the Repórter, Bazar, and Trabalho sections. In July 2006, Correio da Bahia moved from its former headquarters on Avenida Paralela to its current location in Federação, Salvador, where other Rede Bahia outlets were already based. Two years later, in July 2008, the newspaper launched a new multimedia newsroom, and one month later, it underwent graphic redesigns.

According to an audit by the Communication Checker Institute (IVC) published by the National Newspaper Association (ANJ) in September 2010, Correio surpassed the newspaper A Tarde, which had held the top position for decades. In 2012, it had an average circulation of 62,070 copies sold, making it the largest newspaper in the Northeast region and the 16th largest in Brazil by circulation.

In 2015, the newspaper won the Order of Attorneys of Brazil (OAB) Journalism Award in the "print media" category for the report "Onde está meu filho?" ("Where is my son?"), about the Geovane case. In November 2019, the newspaper launched a series of reports on the financial problems of rapid transit, produced in partnership with the newspapers O Povo (from Fortaleza) and Jornal do Commercio (from Recife).
