= Jessica Senra =

Brazilian journalist

- Born: June 12, 1983 (age 43); Salvador, Bahia, Brazil
- Occupations: Journalist and TV host

Jessica Bouzas Senra de Souza, best known as Jessica Senra (born June 12, 1983), is a Brazilian journalist and TV host. She is known for having been, between 2018 and 2024, the anchor and executive editor of Bahia Meio Dia, the highest-rating noon newscast in Salvador, which airs on TV Bahia, a television station owned by Rede Bahia and affiliated to TV Globo in the capital of Bahia.

== Biography ==
Born on June 12, 1983, in Salvador, capital of Bahia, Senra began her studies at Colégio Antônio Vieira, obtaining a partial scholarship with the support of her grandmother, who worked at the institution. At the age of 13, she began acting as a model. In 2000, she used her Exame Nacional do Ensino Médio score to join the Faculdade de Tecnologia e Ciências, where she began studying journalism.

In 2007, a year after graduating in journalism, she went on exchange to Orlando, in the United States, where she worked as a receptionist at a restaurant to support herself, while practicing English. After six months, she went to Barcelona, Spain, where she lived with her mother and completed a master's degree in journalism at the University of Barcelona. She returned to Salvador in 2010.

On September 17, 2016, Senra married businessman Cyro Freitas. The marriage ended on September 24, 2018, and a month later, Jessica began dating lawyer Daniel Keller. The relationship continued until October 2021, and almost a year later, on September 4, 2022, Jessica announced the beginning of her relationship with businessman Yuri Smarcevscki, owner of the Saveiro and Yacht Club da Bahia restaurants in the capital of Bahia.

In 2017, Jessica began making jewelry as a hobby. Her work in goldsmithing gained national attention during her participation in the 50 years of Jornal Nacional project in September 2019, when she presented the anchors of Jornal Nacional, Renata Vasconcellos and William Bonner, with exclusive themed jewelry for the television news program's 50th anniversary.

On December 6, 2019, the Federal University of Bahia released the list of those approved for the postgraduate program in Interdisciplinary Studies on Women, Gender and Feminism, which included Jessica Senra's approval. She was ranked fifth among the candidates, having started her master's degree the following year. In September 2021, Jessica signed up for the Bahia Karate Championship. At the end of the championship, on October 30, she was runner-up.

On April 11, 2024, Senra received from the Salvador City Council the Maria Quitéria Commendation, that recognizes the services provided by her to the community of Bahia. The honor was granted to the presenter in a solemn session at the Cosme de Farias Plenary, with the presence of her family and her colleagues from TV Bahia.

== Career ==
Jessica began working in journalism on February 8, 2003, when she joined an internship at Rádio Metrópole in Salvador after being invited to a test by the station's owner, Mário Kértesz. She began her career on the radio participating in the programs Jornal do Meio Dia and Jornal da Cidade 2ª Edição, both presented by Mário. Afterwards, she took over ownership of a classifieds newsletter. After four months at the station, she created and presented the music program Punkada Rock, shown on Saturday afternoons.

Jessica's performance at Rádio Metrópole began to take breaks in 2007, when she went to live abroad. Upon returning, in 2010, she officially left the station and was invited to a test at Band Bahia, when she was hired to present Jornal da Bahia, the station's new morning newscast launched as part of Band's national standard for on-time local television journalism, in addition to act as a reporter. In the same year, in October, Senra left Band Bahia and returned to Rádio Metrópole as editor-in-chief of Portal da Metrópole, the station's news website.

In May 2011, she left Rádio Metrópole and was hired by TV Record Bahia, continuing with reporting, but covering presenter Carolina Lima's vacation at Bahia Record. In September, after Daniela Prata left the station, she officially took over Bahia no Ar. On December 13, 2012, she was awarded by the Bahia Advertising Market Association as the best press professional of the year.

On April 28, 2014, presented by Senra, Bahia no Ar reached the audience leadership for the first time in the Brazilian Institute of Public Opinion and Statistics measurement, in comparison with Bom Dia Brasil and Mais Você, from TV Globo. On June 29, Senra joined the fixed rotation of presenters for the Saturday edition of the national news program Fala Brasil, on Rede Record. Between 2015 and 2017, comparing national programs in its time slot, Bahia no Ar managed to consolidate itself in the audience leadership.

On March 12, 2018, Jessica Senra left RecordTV Itapoan and signed a contract with TV Bahia, affiliated with TV Globo. Her hiring was part of the beginning of a reformulation of the broadcaster's journalism, aiming to increase the audience and reposition the format of Bahia Meio Dia, which would now be presented by her. Her debut in the newscast presentation was officially announced on April 20.

Jessica debuted on TV Bahia's afternoon news program on May 7, 2018, when several changes to the format were also initiated. In the week of its premiere, the news led Bahia Meio Dia to grow 25% in audience and reach the isolated leadership, beating Balanço Geral BA, a program presented by José Eduardo on RecordTV Itapoan, by a distance of three points. On July 1, 2019, Senra debuted as an occasional presenter on BATV, the state's highest-rated news program. On July 24, Rede Globo announced, in an email sent to all the network's stations, that Senra had been the journalist selected to represent TV Bahia in the rotation of presenters from all states in celebrations for the 50th anniversary of Jornal Nacional.

Senra presented Jornal Nacional for the first time on September 7, 2019, alongside journalist Ayres Rocha, from Rede Amazônica Rio Branco, generating great repercussions on the internet. Jessica was also the first Bahian woman to present the news program. On December 5, she was the only journalist from a Globo affiliate to be hired in the program's fixed rotation, along with Márcio Bonfim, from TV Globo Pernambuco, and Aline Aguiar, from TV Globo Minas. On February 8, 2020, she returned to presenting Jornal Nacional, alongside Heraldo Pereira. Jessica would return to the newspaper's bench on June 27, but her participation did not take place due to the COVID-19 pandemic, which led Globo to suspend the rotation.

On January 7, 2020, Senra received repercussions in the national and international press after criticizing live, during Bahia Meio Dia, the possibility of hiring former goalkeeper Bruno, convicted of the death of Eliza Samúdio, by Fluminense de Feira. The comment caused the club to give up hiring the criminal on the same day. After the case, Globo's director of journalism, Ali Kamel, confirmed that both Jessica and other news anchors at Globo and its affiliates have the right to express opinions during the news programs.

In June 2021, Jessica left TV Bahia due to medical advice following the onset of burnout syndrome. Although her return was initially announced for June 28, she remained away until August 16, when she returned to the presentation of Bahia Meio Dia. A month later, on September 2, she became involved in a controversy with competitor RecordTV Itapoan, after reporter Camila Oliveira was interrupted during an interview with delegate Simone Moutinho by reporter Marcelo Castro, who was live on Balanço Geral BA and invaded the TV Bahia link shouting. On air, Jessica stated: "we need respect to be able to work."

On September 27, 2023, Jessica debuted as a columnist for the iBahia portal, which is part of Rede Bahia. The first text published in the column, which was called O Olhar Dela, had as its theme the impostor syndrome. A day later, at an event, TV Bahia announced that Jessica would be the host of the talk show Diga Aí, shown after Fantástico. The program has an auditorium and premiered on November 26.

On December 4, 2024, TV Bahia and Rede Bahia announced Jessica Senra's exit of Bahia Meio Dia after six years. According to the communication, Senra will maintain an association with the station, but without acting in daily journalism. On that day's newscast, Senra affirmed the decision was "quite mature" and "taken in association with Rede Bahia". Senra continued the presentation of the newscast until December 20, when she said goodbye and was honored live by the team of the channel 11.

== Awards and nominations ==
Year	Award	Category	Result	Ref.
2012	Prêmio ABMP	Press Professional	Won	
2020	Melhores do Ano NaTelinha	Best Local Presenter	Won	
2023	Melhores do Ano NaTelinha	Best Local Presenter	Nominated	
