= Uauá =

Coordinates: 9°50′S 39°28′W

- Municipality
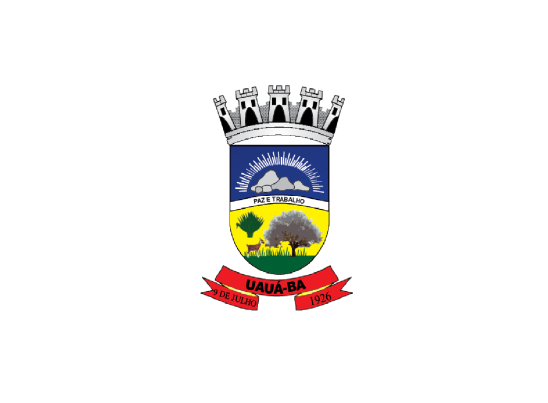
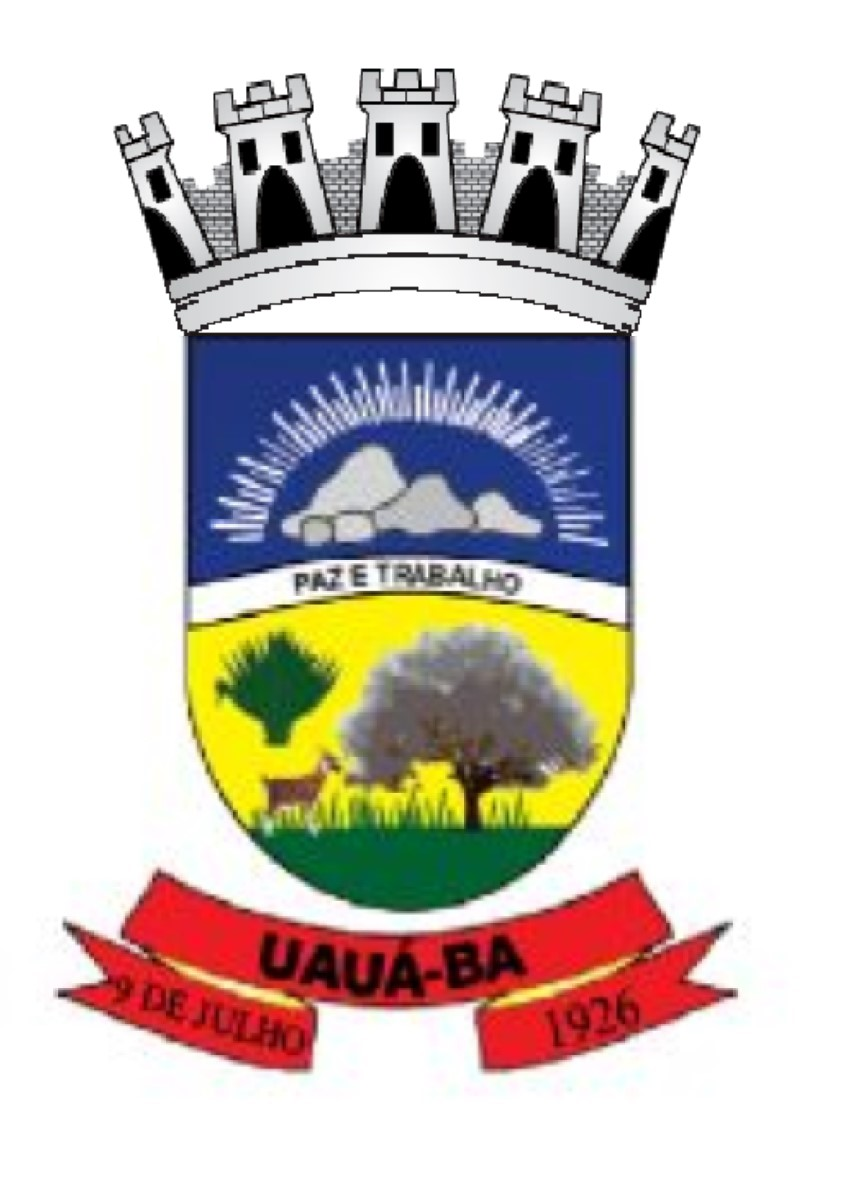
- Flag Coat of arms
- Interactive map of Uauá
- Country: Brazil
- Region: Nordeste
- State: Bahia

Population (2020)
  - Total: 24,113
- Time zone: UTC−3 (BRT)

Uauá [pronounce: uaua] is a municipality in the state of Bahia in the North-East region of Brazil.

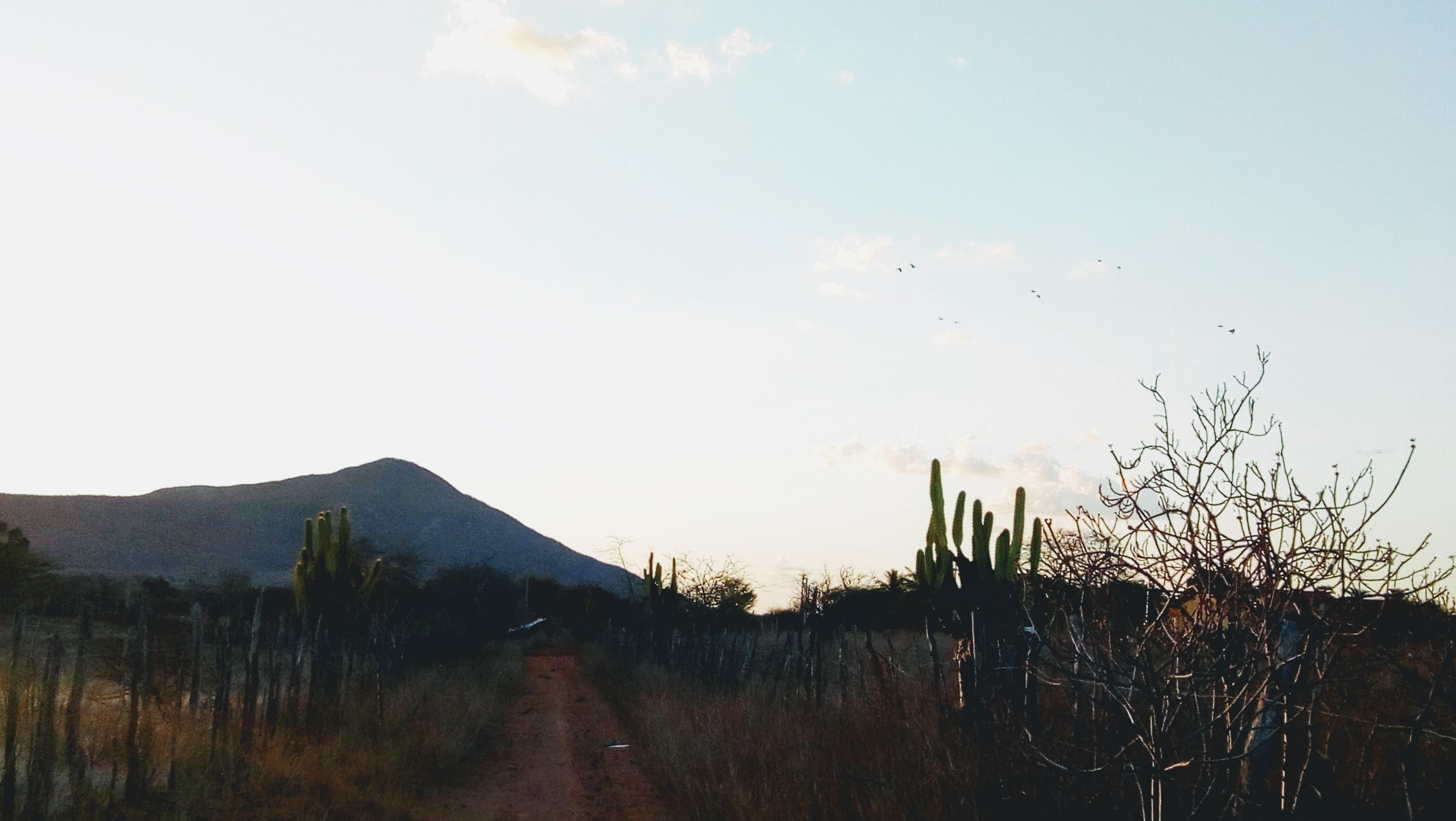
Near Community to Uauá (Poronhem)

== Meaning ==
The Word "Uauá" is a Tupi-Guarani origin word.

== History ==
Uauá developed in the 18th century when Francisco Ribeiro created a farm, called 'Uauá' at the banks of the river Vaza-Barris on property belonging to Garcia d'Ávila. A village developed near the farm. In 1896, it was the camp for an Army Infantry Company which fought in the Guerra de Canudos or "Canudo's War".

In 1905, after recovering from the damage caused by the Canudos War, it became the district seat of the Community of Monte Santo by the Brazilian state law 590, of July 8, 1905. After some time, it was elevated to the Borough Category by the Brazilian state law 1866 of July 9, 1926. By 1931, the municipality of Uauá had become extinct and its territory was once again a district of the Community of Monte Santo, by Brazilian state decrees 7455 of June 23, 1931, and 7479, dated July 8, 1931. In 1933, it once again became the Independent Borough of Uauá through Brazilian state law 8641 of September 19, 1933, being enacted on October 10 of the same year.

The Districts of Caldeirão and Serra da Canabrava that had been part of Uauá' were also created and attached to the Borough by Brazilian state (Bahia) law 628 on December 30, 1953.

== Demography ==
In the "census 2010" (the 12th census operation carried out in Brazilian territory), 24,294 inhabitants were recorded, according to the Brazilian Institute of Geography and Statistics. In 2020, the population was stated to be 24,113.

== Economy ==
Uauá, Bahia, is a Borough economically supported and moved by subsistence economy, characterized by the handling of goats and nationally known as "The Capital of Goats". The title is a reference to the exhibition of goat and sheep meats that happens annually and also by the reputation for owns the tastiest goat meat in the region. The goat represents 1/3 of the Borough's Gross Domestic Product around R$37 million, according to the Caatinga Biome Survey, in 2010. Latterly, the Borough has been implementing throughout the Regional Institute of The Proper Small Size Farming and the Family Farming Cooperative of Curaçá, Uauá And Canudos, in English; support programs of interaction with Semi-arid climate that have changed many family-lives through the benefaction of hinterland fruits, an example is Umbú.

== Education ==
The Royal College of Science and Technology arrived in the City/Borough in 2005, since then it has offered not only Higher Education with Technological Graduation, Bachelors and Literature, such as Postgraduate education/post-graduate courses, everything in the correspondence education system. The Borough also counts on technicals courses on labor safety, livestock production, agricultural business, accounting, nursing, informatics, nurture, and dietetics. It also counts on Federal Government's Pronatec, in the Old State School Antônio Conselheiro (CEAC), currently, Territorial Center of Professional Education "Sertão do São Francisco II Antônio Conselheiro - CETEP SSF IIAC". In 2014 the UNINTER also had begun offering correspondence Graduation Courses in the city.

== Technology ==
The Borough arranges two Access Suppliers (ISP) offering Broadband Internet in the Borough Headquarters. Both own wireless infrastructure in the Borough Headquarters. Therefore, the Government of the State of Bahia together with the Borough Town Hall by an agreement, in 2007, opened the first info-center of the Borough. A program called Digital ID is equipped with varied computers with the operating system Linux and offers courses for Basic Informatics and access to the Web for underprivileged people.

== Nearby cities ==
- Canudos
- Monte Santo
