= EPTV Campinas =

EPTV Campinas (ZYB 859)
- Campinas, São Paulo; Brazil
- Channels: Digital: 25 (UHF); Virtual: 12

Programming
- Affiliations: TV Globo

Ownership
- Owner: Grupo EP; (Empresa Paulista de Televisão S/A)

History
- First air date: October 1, 1979
- Former names: TV Campinas (1979-1989)
- Former channel numbers: Analog: 12 (VHF, 1979-2018); Digital: 42 (UHF, 2008-2018)

Technical information
- Licensing authority: ANATEL
- ERP: 9 kW
- Transmitter coordinates: 22°56′38.6″S 47°01′51″W

Links
- Public license information: Profile
- Website: redeglobo.globo.com/sp/eptv

EPTV Campinas (channel 12) is a television station in Campinas, São Paulo, Brazil, affiliated with TV Globo, flagship station of EPTV and owned by Grupo EP. EPTV Campinas' studios and transmitter are located on Regina Nogueira Street, in the Jardim São Gabriel district.

== History ==
José Bonifácio Coutinho Nogueira, owner of the parent company of the station, Emissoras Paulistas de Televisão, set up construction permits for channel 12 in Campinas and channel 7 in Ribeirão Preto in 1976. He had previously worked for TV Cultura in 1967, assisting in its rebuilding, as the station was in the process of being reconverted to an educational television station. He also created Vila Sésamo, the Brazilian adaptation of Sesame Street, which aired on Globo.

At the time, there wasn't fierce competition for setting up television stations in the inland regions of Brazilian states, which led to José Bonifácio Coutinho Nogueira studying the market and finding favorable conditions in Campinas. An agreement was signed with Organizações Globo in March 1978, enabling the future station to become its affiliate. The then TV Campinas was founded on October 1, 1979, by the politician José Bonifácio Coutinho Nogueira, being the first station of EPTV, later arriving to the regions of Ribeirão Preto, southern Minas Gerais and São Carlos. In the time, the newscast Jornal Regional was transmitted over the names of Jornal Hoje (the first edition was a regional block of the national edition) and Jornal das Sete (the second edition).

On December 24, 1986, during the coverage of the fire occurred in the Eldorado supermarket in Campinas, the video-tape operator of TV Campinas, Ronaldo Gomes, was dead buried after the collapse of part of a lateral wall of the building, being that his body only was found three days later in the half of the rubbles. The film reporter of the station, Renato Isidoro, also injured himself in the collapse, and he was taken to the hospital, where it was considered head trauma. He stayed in a coma by 15 days, and part of his face had to be rebuilt by a plastic surgeon.

EPTV Campinas has a large history of investments in its signal quality. Since June 2007, it already produced the content of the program Terra da Gente in high-definition. In the introduction of the digital television in Brazil, in December 2007, EPTV marked its place recording the images in high-definition to the first Globo Repórter of the digital television with images recorded in Queensland and in the Great Barrier Reef, in Australia. In the following year, it recorded also in high-definition the series Combate da Venda Grande, an episode occurred in Campinas during the Liberal Rebellions of 1842.

== Digital television ==
Channel	Video	Aspect	Programming
12.1	25 UHF	1080i	Main EPTV Campinas programming / TV Globo

On October 22, 2008, EPTV Campinas started the experimental transmission of the digital signal, over UHF channel 42. The definitive transmission started on December 3. With this, EPTV became the first inlander affiliate with TV Globo to start the digital transmissions outside the capitals. Its coverage area with UHF external antenna was first limited to the cities nearby Campinas, that received the analog signal of the TV station, over VHF channel 12. Starting September 21, 2009, EPTV Campinas passed to present all its programs in high-definition.

=== Transition to digital signal ===
The station turned off its analog signal, over VHF channel 12, on January 17, 2018, as part of the federally mandated transition from analog to digital television. The switch-off occurred at 11:59 pm, during a live bulletin made of the switcher of the station. With this, EPTV Campinas changed its physical channel, from UHF 42 to 25.
