= Wanda Chase =

Brazilian journalist

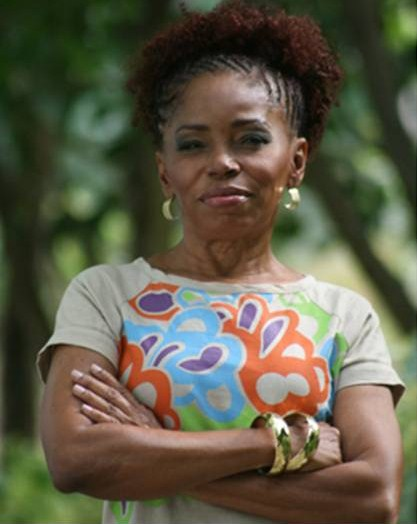
- Born: November 19, 1950; Manaus, Amazonas, Brazil
- Died: April 3, 2025 (aged 74); Salvador, Bahia, Brazil
- Occupations: Journalist and activist
- Employer(s): TV Bahia and other broadcast networks

Wanda Chase da Silva (November 19, 1950 — April 3, 2025) was a Brazilian journalist and an activist in her country's Black Movement.

Known for her work in cultural journalism, early in her career Chase became one of only a few black broadcast journalists in Bahia. Her promotion of Afro-Brazilian culture, coverage of the Bahian Carnival, and activism with the Movimento Negro Unificado led to her characterization as a "voice of the Black Movement."

== Early life and education ==
Wanda Chase da Silva was born in Manaus, Brazil, in 1950. She was the oldest daughter of five children born to a homemaker and a machinist. Some of her ancestors had come to Amazonas from Maranhão, while her maternal grandparents had immigrated to Brazil from Barbados.

Encouraged by one of her teachers to become a journalist, Chase studied communications at the Federal University of Amazonas, graduating in 1974.

== Journalism ==
Chase's journalistic career began at the newspaper A Crítica and the stations TV Encontro das Águas and Rede Amazônica Manaus (then known as TV Amazonas).

Later, she moved to the Northeast, where she worked in Recife (at the newspaper A Cidade and the radio station Jordnal) and in Campina Grande (for the channel TV Paraíba). She also contributed to the broadcast networks Rede Manchete and TV Cabo Branco.

After moving to Salvador around 1990, she became an investigative reporter for TV Bahia, then became increasingly engaged in cultural journalism, serving as a commentator for the Bahian Carnival. She reported for the television programs Rede Bahia Revista and Bahia Meio Dia until her dismissal in 2015. Immediately after leaving, she began working for TV Aratu. In 2017, she returned to TV Bahia to cover that year's Carnival. After a brief stint at TV Educativa da Bahia in 2018, she went back to TV Aratu.

After retiring from television, Chase wrote the column "Opraí Wanda Chase" for the website iBahia, hosted the podcasts "Papo Ciência" (for the Federal Institute Baiano) and "Bastidores com Wanda Chase," and worked on a book about the history of axé music.

== Activism ==
After moving to Northeastern Brazil, a stronghold of Afro-Brazilian culture, Chase joined the Movimento Negro Unificado and began wearing her hair in an afro.

In the 1980s, she began spending time in the regional capital, Salvador, where she joined protest marches for the liberation of Nelson Mandela and for Ilê Aiyê's Noite da Beleza Negra ("Night of Black Beauty"). She moved permanently to the city around the end of that decade, becoming further enmeshed in the city's black Carnival community as an advisor and press officer for the carnival block Olodum. She worked throughout her career to promote Afro-Brazilian culture and combat racial inequality.

== Death and legacy ==
Chase died during surgery for an aortic aneurysm in 2025. She was 74 years old. Her cremation was held at Salvador's Campo Santo Cemetery.

The Legislative Assembly of Bahia honored her posthumously in a special session with the title Citizen of Bahia on April 7, 2025, which is Brazil's Dia do Jornalista ("Day of the Journalist").
