= TV Santa Cruz =

Brazilian television station

TV Santa Cruz (ZYA 302)
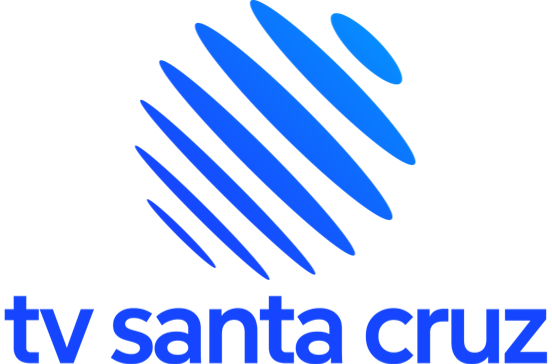

Itabuna, Bahia; Brazil
- Channels: Digital: 30 (UHF); Virtual: 4

Programming
- Affiliations: TV Globo

Ownership
- Owner: Rede Bahia; (Televisão Santa Cruz Ltda.)
- Sister stations: Bahia FM Sul

History
- Founded: August 17, 1984
- First air date: November 5, 1988
- Former channel numbers: Analog: 4 (VHF, 1988-2025)

Technical information
- Licensing authority: ANATEL
- ERP: 5 kW (analog); 1 kW (digital)
- HAAT: 76 m (249 ft)
- Transmitter coordinates: 14°46′50.2″S 39°15′43.2″W

Links
- Public license information: Profile
- Website: redeglobo.globo.com/redebahia

TV Santa Cruz (channel 4) is a Brazilian television station licensed to Itabuna, Bahia, serving as an affiliate of TV Globo for Itabuna and surrounding areas. Owned by Rede Bahia, TV Santa Cruz is part of Rede Bahia de Televisão, a statewide television network composed of another five TV stations. TV Santa Cruz's studios and transmitter are located on Montes Claros Street in the Fátima district, on Itabuna.

== History ==
The station was inaugurated on November 5, 1988, being the second station affiliated with Rede Globo in the interior of Bahia, and the first belonging to Grupo TV Bahia. Initially, its shareholders were ACM Júnior, André Maron and César Mata Pires. Several professionals from Salvador, such as João Aldemir Venceslau (who later took part in the implementation of TV Subaé) and Carlos Ribas, who was from TV Bahia, were part of the network's implementation team. The station was responsible for creating the variety show Somos Nós, which also had a version produced by TV Sudoeste, from Vitória da Conquista.

Logo used by the station from 1998 to 2025.

In 2001, TV Santa Cruz debuts, in place of Somos Nós, Encontro Com, a journalistic program that had each edition dedicated to a different theme. It was hosted by Renata Smith, who also commanded the predecessor program, and broadcast on Saturdays, after Jornal Hoje. It was kept on the station's schedule until June 25, 2005, being replaced the following Saturday by the sports journalistic program Bahia Esporte, from TV Bahia.

In March 2008, amidst disputes over the inheritance of Antônio Carlos Magalhães, César Mata Pires, one of the station's shareholders at the time, refused to sign the renewal of TV Santa Cruz's license. The reason was his defeat in the dispute for control of Rede Bahia. The purpose of preventing the station's renewal was to pressure the majority shareholders to cede control of the group to him, as there was a fear that TV Santa Cruz would lose its license. Subsequently, the station's license was renewed, and in 2012, César Mata Pires sold his share of Rede Bahia to Grupo EP, owner of EPTV, also affiliated with Rede Globo.

On August 1, 2017, TV Santa Cruz laid off 9 employees as part of network-wide layoffs. In January 2018, the station fired employees and closed its local office in Teixeira de Freitas.

On May 10, 2021, the station began to broadcast a fully local produced edition of the noon newscast Bahia Meio Dia, also debuting changes in its set.

== Digital television ==
=== Digital channels ===
Channel	Video	Aspect	Short name	Programming
4.1	1080i	16:9	TV SANTA CRUZ	Main TV Santa Cruz programming / TV Globo

=== Analog-to-digital conversion ===
TV Santa Cruz began testing the implementation of its digital signal on November 24, 2013, on the 30 UHF channel. On December 11, it officially began broadcasting, also inaugurating the digital signal on the Ilhéus translator station, via channel 28 UHF. The station's newscasts started to be produced in high definition on June 15, 2015.

TV Santa Cruz planned to shut down its analog signal, over VHF channel 4, on December 31, 2023, following ANATEL's official schedule, as part of the federally mandated transition from analog to digital television. The station officially shuttered its analog signal on June 30, 2025 following the ANATEL roadmap for most of the state of Bahia.

== News operation ==
TV Santa Cruz currently broadcasts 6 hours and 5 minutes of locally produced newscasts each week (with 1 hour and 13 minutes each weekday, through the local editions of newscasts Bahia Meio Dia and BATV, anchored by Aracelly Romão and Roger Sarmento, respectively). The station formerly produced the local editions of newscasts Bahia Agora and Jornal da Manhã, in addition to the local-produced block of the Sundays nightly newsmagazine program Rede Bahia Revista.

=== Notable on-air staff ===
==== Former ====
- Cláudia Barthel

== See also ==
- Rede Bahia de Televisão
- TV Globo
