= TV Bahia =

Television station in Bahia, Brazil

TV Bahia (ZYA298)

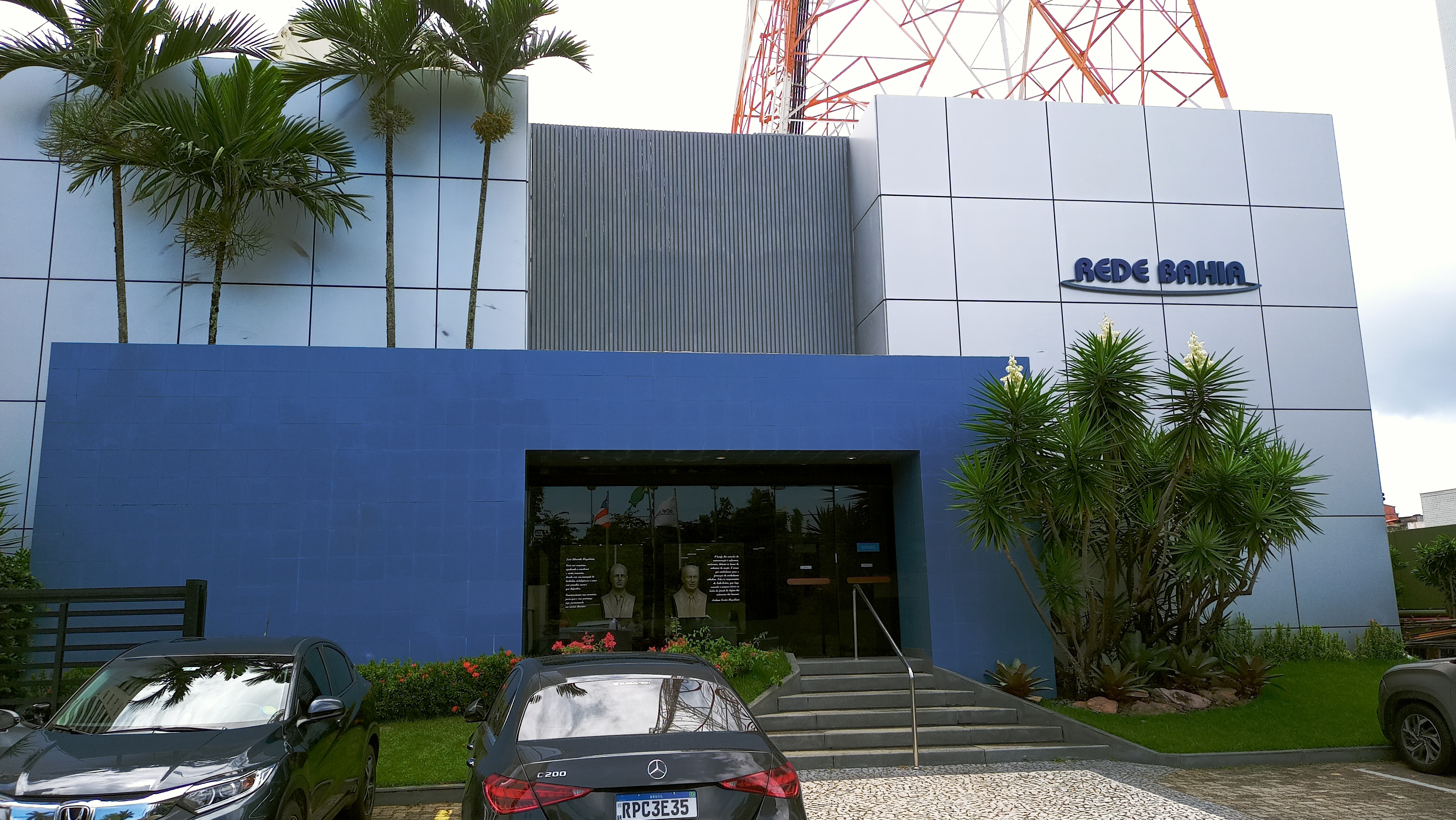
- Salvador, Bahia; Brazil
- Channels: Digital: 28 (UHF); Virtual: 11
- Branding: TV Bahia (general); Rede Bahia de Televisão (during programs broadcast statewide)

Programming
- Affiliations: TV Globo

Ownership
- Owner: Rede Bahia; (Televisão Bahia S.A.)
- Sister stations: Bahia FM, GFM, Jovem Pan FM Salvador

History
- Founded: December 19, 1983
- First air date: March 10, 1985
- Former channel numbers: Analog: 11 (VHF, 1985–2017)
- Former affiliations: Rede Manchete (1985–1987)

Technical information
- Licensing authority: ANATEL
- ERP: 15 kW
- HAAT: 160 m (525 ft)
- Transmitter coordinates: 13°0′12.2″S 38°30′42.4″W

Links
- Public license information: Profile
- Website: redeglobo.globo.com/redebahia

TV Bahia (channel 11) is a television station in Salvador, Bahia, Brazil, affiliated with TV Globo. Is the flagship station of Rede Bahia de Televisão, a statewide television network composed of another five stations owned-and-operated by Rede Bahia. TV Bahia's studios and transmitter are located on Prof. Aristídes Novis Street in the Federação district, in Salvador. Its terrestrial signal, through the station in Salvador and translators, reaches 133 cities in the state. Currently, besides being the leader in Salvador, it has the largest ratings among Globo's stations in Brazil.

TV Bahia is the fourth oldest television station in Bahia, having officially started broadcasting ten months after receiving the authorization for channel 11 VHF in Salvador from the federal government, on March 10, 1985. It was inaugurated as an Rede Manchete affiliate, starting its operations with the most modern equipment among the state's television stations at the time.

It became a partner of Rede Globo in 1987, after a troubled transition process, marked by a long judicial and political dispute initiated by the owners of TV Aratu (channel 4). With the Globo affiliation, it made its first big expansion of local programming, premiering two editions of the now-traditional newscast BATV and Jornal da Manhã, its first morning newscast. The affiliation with the Rio de Janeiro network turned TV Bahia into the station with the largest audience in Bahia.

== History ==
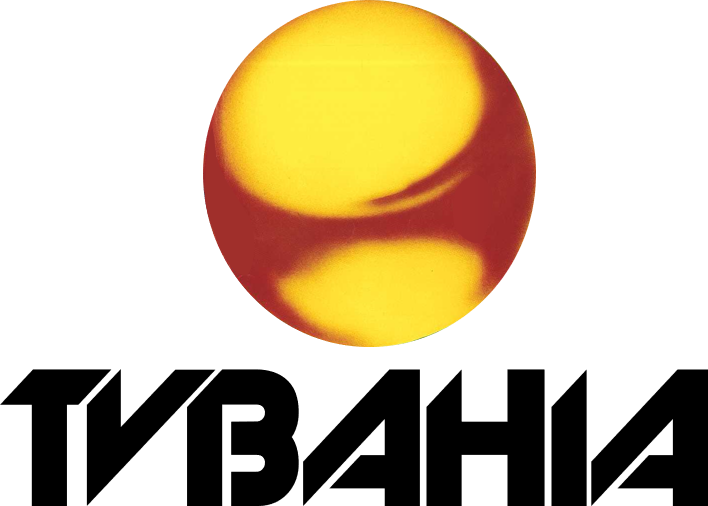
The station's first logo, used from 1985 to 1991. The symbol represented the sun, in reference to the slogan Está nascendo um novo sol na Bahia (A new sun is rising in Bahia), and in TV Bahia's first station ID, it was derived from one of the spheres of ends of the "M", logo of Rede Manchete.

=== Rede Manchete (1985–1987) ===
On May 7, 1984, Televisão Bahia Ltda. received a concession to operate a television broadcasting service in Salvador in a decree issued by then-president João Figueiredo. Initially, the station's shareholders were the entrepreneurs Antônio Carlos Magalhães Júnior (ACM Júnior) and César Mata Pires. The company, which was authorized to operate on channel 11 VHF in Salvador, also had Luís Eduardo Magalhães and Oscar Maron as shareholders.

In August of the same year, however, it was reported that the Federal Government was considering revoking the concession of the future station due to the adoption of a critical stance towards the regime by former governor Antônio Carlos Magalhães (a relative of part of the company's shareholders), which at first, prejudiced affiliation negotiations with Rede Manchete.

Finally, the license was maintained, and the creation of TV Bahia was officially announced to the market on January 9, 1985, at a dinner held at the Bahiano Tennis Club. The new TV station in Salvador would be the first partner of Rede Manchete in Bahia, and the event included a speech by Rubens Furtado, then-director general of the Rio de Janeiro network.

TV Bahia was installed with the most modern equipment among television stations in the state of Bahia at the time. In its early days, the station had five editing islands, state-of-the-art VT equipment, a 300-kW transmitter, and the tallest TV antenna in northern and northeastern Brazil. On February 2, the day of the Iemanjá Festival, TV Bahia conducted its first experimental operations on VHF channel 11.

Initially, TV Bahia was to start its activities on February 28, 1985, but the inauguration was delayed. The station finally signed on for the first time on March 10, 1985, at 6:45 pm, with the transmission of an inauguration ceremony presented by Xuxa Meneghel, then host of the children's program Clube da Criança on Rede Manchete, as well as Governor of Bahia João Durval Carneiro, former governor Antônio Carlos Magalhães and Catholic cardinal Avelar Brandão Vilela.

After the ceremony, TV Bahia broadcast its inaugural program: Bahia de Todos os Santos, a documentary directed by filmmaker Nelson Pereira dos Santos. The first local program after the station's inauguration was the sports journalistic program Manchete Esportiva Bahia, a local version of the program with the same name from Rede Manchete, aired live at 12:30 pm on March 11, 1985, and hosted by Ivan Pedro.

TV Bahia began its activities with coverage in the cities of Feira de Santana (channel 8), Ilhéus (channel 13), Itabuna (channel 9), Jequié (channel 2) and Vitória da Conquista (channel 10). Programming was retransmitted to the interior of the state via translator stations maintained by the Bahia State Telecommunications Department (Detelba), which used microwave links from Telecommunications of Bahia (Telebahia), the same structure used by the other stations in the capital.

In its first year of existence, TV Bahia achieved significant ratings in Salvador. In the first month, Manchete Esportiva Bahia achieved vice-leadership several times, beating the traditional Telesportes, from TV Itapoan (channel 5). Also in March, TV Bahia was the ratings leader on Tuesday evenings. During the year, the station also reached the second place in several programs, including Bahia em Manchete.

=== TV Globo (1987–present) ===
On November 10, 1986, Rede Globo made official the non-renewal of its affiliation contract with TV Aratu (channel 4), which had been its affiliate since 1969, ordering that the station cease broadcasting the network's programming on January 20, 1987, after the end of the extension of the end of the partnership. Globo had already expressed to TV Aratu its intention not to renew the affiliation contract on February 24 of that year, alleging dissatisfaction existing since 1984 on the part of Globo regarding technical and commercial problems of the then Bahia affiliate. The station chosen to replace TV Aratu was TV Bahia. As Globo's final decision occurred shortly before Organizações Globo's purchase of NEC's Brazilian branch, in December of that year, opponents of ACM, to which TV Aratu was associated, raised suspicions that Globo president Roberto Marinho's decision was a way to thank him for the minister's alleged support of the transaction, in order to try to reverse the loss of affiliation.

On January 13, 1987, congressman Luís Viana Neto, of the Brazilian Democratic Movement Party (PMDB), one of the shareholders of TV Aratu and member of the political group of then governor Waldir Pires, went to Brasília, along with 19 other deputies, to complain to president José Sarney regarding the situation. On January 15, Judge Luiz Fux of the 9th Civil Court of Rio de Janeiro granted TV Aratu an injunction preventing TV Bahia from retransmitting Globo's programming. The injunction was overturned on January 23, after TV Globo filed a writ of mandamus in the Court of Justice of the State of Rio de Janeiro to ensure the transmission of its programming by TV Bahia. At 5:58 pm, TV Bahia began to broadcast Globo's programming, after airing a statement informing the viewers about the new affiliation, which was also officially announced in the day's edition of Globo's national newscast Jornal Nacional. TV Aratu, however, ignored the decision, which meant that viewers in Bahia had two channels broadcasting Globo for three days in a row across the state.

By order of the regional directorate of National Department of Telecommunications (DENTEL), TV Aratu was forced to stop broadcasting Globo's programming on January 26. The station, then, began to broadcast the programming of Rede Manchete, and continued in court trying to nullify Globo's writ of mandamus. On March 31, judges Jorge Loretti, Narciso Pinto and Astrogildo Freitas of the 5th Civil Chamber of Rio de Janeiro, suspended Globo's writ of mandamus after judging that the network filed an appeal after the deadline. TV Aratu returned to rebroadcasting Globo programs, but TV Bahia did not immediately comply, resulting in both channels broadcasting the same programming until April 4, when TV Bahia resumed broadcasting Manchete programming. The court battle lasted for another three months until judge Nicolau Mary Júnior granted the injunction in favor of Globo on July 6; at that time, TV Bahia definitively resumed the affiliation with the network, becoming the state's highest rated TV station.

In June 1990, with the approach of the electoral period in Bahia, several candidates for state and federal deputies were installing pirate satellite dish systems in cities in the interior of the state that did not have translator stations, in order to insert, during the breaks and local spaces of Rede Globo's national programming, irregular advertisements of their candidacies. The practice led TV Bahia to install a transcoding system that prevented the unauthorized retransmission of the Globo signal.

With the repositioning of the Grupo TV Bahia, which took the Rede Bahia branding on July 2, 1998, TV Bahia became the network head of Rede Bahia de Televisão, officially leading the five Rede Globo affiliate stations in the countryside. Two months earlier, part of the shares of TV Subaé in Feira de Santana had been acquired by the conglomerate, which made the station no longer an affiliate and become an owned-and-operated station of the state network led by TV Bahia since 1988 (when TV Santa Cruz was inaugurated in Itabuna).

Logo used by the station from 1998 to 2025.

On June 23, 2000, DTH operator Sky started to carry the station's programming, making TV Bahia the fifth Globo station uplinked on the service, after the network's owned-and-operated stations in Belo Horizonte, Rio de Janeiro and São Paulo, in addition to Rio Grande do Sul affiliate RBS TV. In 2001, TV Bahia didn't manage to record images of the coverage of a conflict between military police and students of the Federal University of Bahia that occurred during a protest against the then senator ACM. Although other local TV stations in Salvador also missed the first conflict, rumors circulated that TV Bahia would lose its affiliation with the Rio de Janeiro network, due to a supposed destabilization in the relationship between the groups that allegedly was generated from the lack of images. The situation, however, was denied by Globo, which stated that TV Bahia was the best performing affiliate of the network. The contract with Rede Bahia was renewed on June 21.

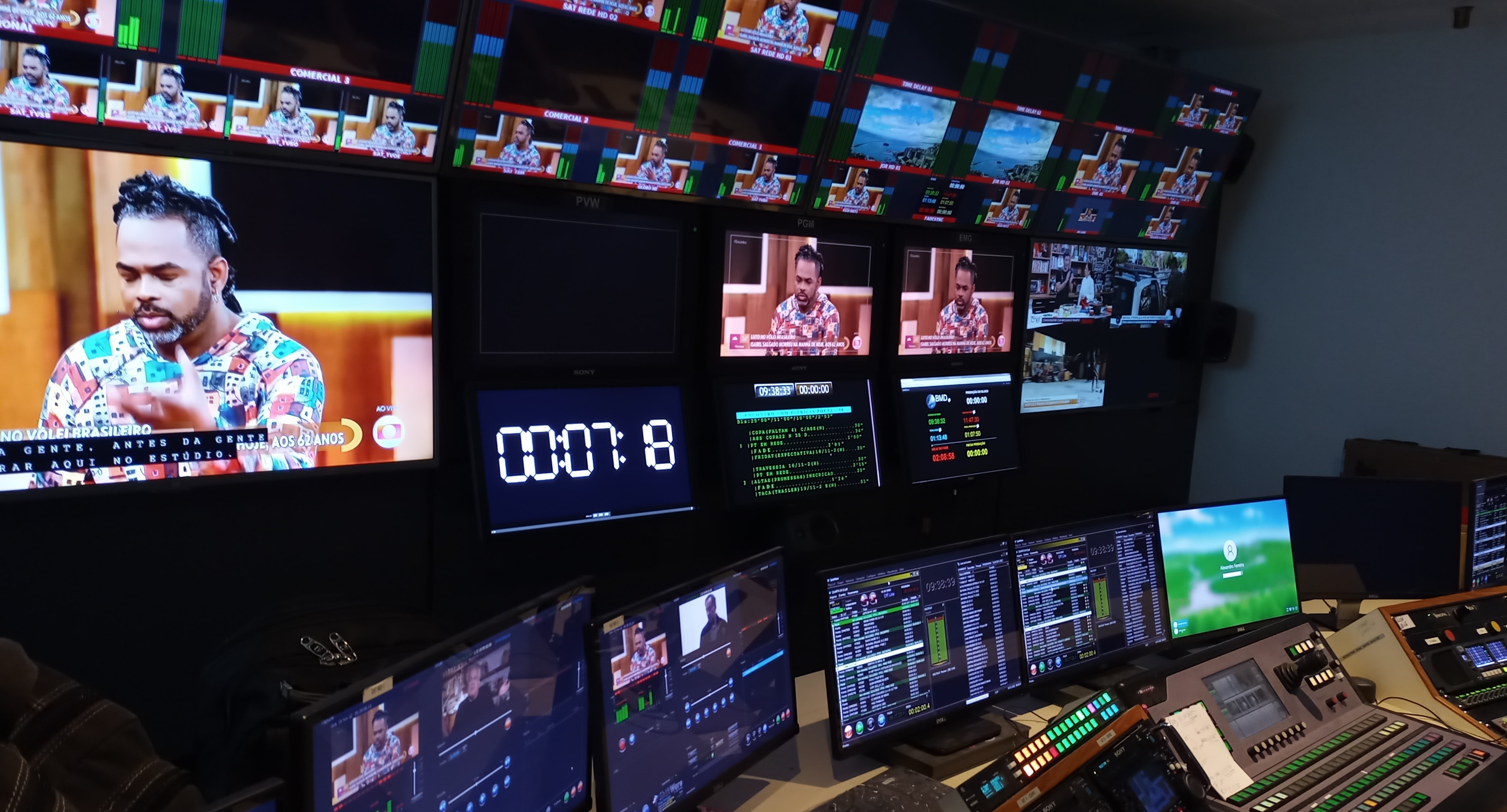
TV Bahia's master control in 2022.

In 2008, a dispute among TV Bahia shareholders began, with parties vying for control of the business. ACM Júnior won out, and four years later, in June 2012, César Mata Pires sold his stake to Campinas, São Paulo-based Grupo EP, owner of EPTV, a network composed of Globo-affiliated stations serving cities in São Paulo state and one in of Minas Gerais. Amidst the internal conflicts, there was an investment of R$9 million in a new transmitter, a new 160-meter (520 ft) antenna, and a new master control.

In the 2014 edition of the National Programming Award, held by Rede Globo, TV Bahia was awarded as the station with the largest ratings among the affiliates of the Rio de Janeiro network throughout Brazil. In the same award, it was recognized for the call for the broadcast of the match between Juazeirense and Juazeiro, considered the best of its kind among the network's partners, and for the entertainment program Mosaico Baiano, which was one of the three best regional online programs of the year.

In May 2019, Rede Bahia carried out layoffs of several journalists and other employees of TV Bahia, after the company lost money in 2018. Documentation Center (CEDOC) and marketing team employees were fired, in addition to veteran newscaster Anna Valéria, who had been at the station for 31 years. That December, TV Bahia started to live broadcast its programming through Globoplay, Grupo Globo's streaming platform.

On January 4, 2023, TV Bahia announced new changes in top management positions, which took effect on April 1. Eurico Meira da Costa left Rede Bahia after five years, and was replaced by news manager Ana Raquel Copetti, who became mews director. The sports sector is no longer linked to the news department, being now part of the programming area (responsible for the production of entertainment programs). Sports manager Alexandre Boyd became the Programming, Entertainment and Sports director, replacing Carlyle Ávila, who also left the station.

In March 2023, already recovered from financial and ratings problems caused by a good phase of competitor RecordTV Itapoan, TV Bahia became one of the three most watched TV Globo stations in Brazil, according to the Kantar IBOPE Media measurement. The affiliate reached the third highest ratiings among affiliates and Globo's O&O stations, behind only the network's main flagship station, TV Globo Rio de Janeiro, and the affiliate RBS TV Porto Alegre. The local programs with the highest ratings shown by TV Bahia were the local newscasts Jornal da Manhã and Bahia Meio Dia, while on the national program the highlights were the rerun of O Rei do Gado on Vale a Pena Ver de Novo and the seven o'clock soap opera Vai na Fé, respectively. On December 6, TV Bahia was awarded by TV Globo as the network's station with the largest ratings, surpassing all those that are part of Kantar IBOPE Media's National Television Panel (PNT).

== Programming ==
=== Entertainment programming ===
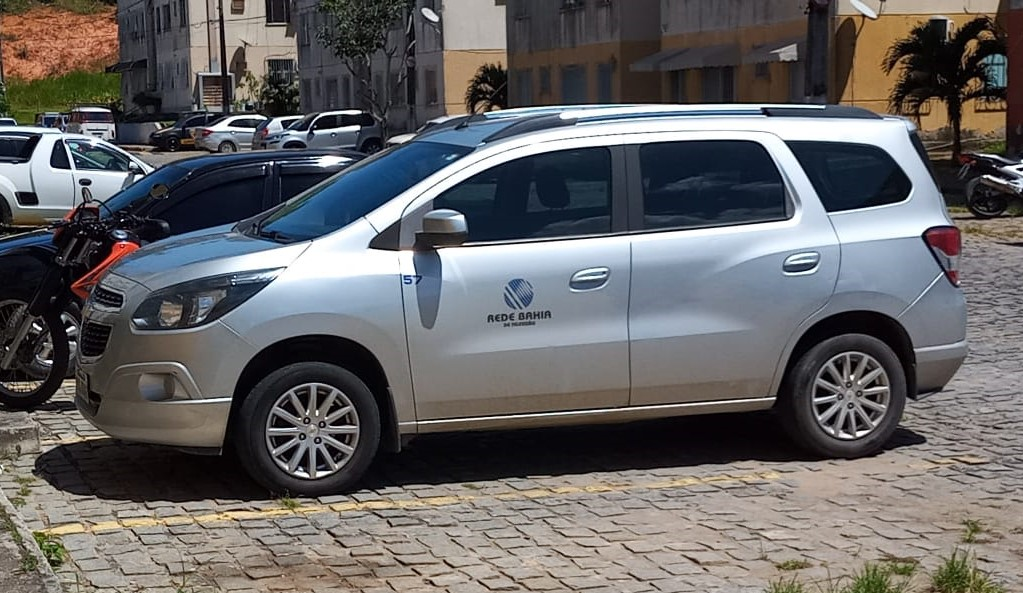
TV Bahia-owned Chevrolet Spin in a report for the program Mosaico Baiano at the neighborhood of São Cristóvão, in Salvador.

TV Bahia broadcasts two variety shows on Saturdays. Conexão Bahia deals with themes related to the culture and the daily life of Bahians, being hosted by playwright Aldri Anunciação. On Mosaico Baiano, presented by Luana Souza and Pablo Vasconcelos, curiosities, clips, documentaries, special series, and film reviews, among other features, are shown.

Previous local non-news programs from TV Bahia have included The interview program, Michelle Marie Entrevista, an interview program hosted by Michelle Marie Magalhães (which featured reports by Wagner Moura); the variety show Arerê Geral (with Jackson Costa and Flávia Mendonça as presenters, which premiered on January 18, 2001; and Na Carona (hosted by Liliane Reis).

On September 9, 2017, Aprovado, presented by Jackson Costa, was discontinued, and in its place, Conexão Bahia premiered on September 16, presented by Renata Menezes and Aldri Anunciação. Renata left the program and the station on February 18, 2019.

TV Bahia was the first Rede Globo affiliate to locally produce a telenovela. The attraction, entitled Danada de Sabida, premiered on January 7, 1997. Broadcast exclusively in the state, the production was inspired by the book Já Podeis da Pátria Filhos, by João Ubaldo Ribeiro, having been filmed in the cities of Cachoeira, São Francisco do Conde and São Gonçalo dos Campos.

Musical program Sente o Som, hosted by Camila Marinho and directed by Marcela Amorim, debuted on January 5, 2019. The seven episodes of the first season featured interviews with artists from Bahia and musical performances. Four episodes were broadcast in Portugal as part of programming for carnival on the TV Globo Portugal cable channel.

During the June Festivals of 2020, the station was criticized for the choice of Léo Santana, a pagode singer, for the presentation in São João do Nordeste, the São João festivities special program from Globo's owned-and-operated flagship station for the Northeast of Brazil based in Recife, Pernambuco, TV Globo Nordeste. Artists from different musical genres criticized the decision of choosing an artist from a genre other than forró, which is the most traditional musical style of these festivities. In a statement, TV Bahia ratified that it gave space to several forró artists during its programming for the month of June, through "special programs, reports and interviews about the São João festivities".

During 2020, TV Bahia produced several special attractions, aired on Saturdays. The station's first production was the special program Sessão Pet, presented by Pablo Vasconcelos and his pet dog, "Lilica", consisting in content about pet care, as well as stories of owners with their pets. Premiered on October 24, the attraction had three episodes. On November 28, Na Carona returned to the schedule after 13 years of its extinction, in a special edition format. Also hosted by Pablo Vasconcelos, the relaunch program was dedicated to the city of Porto Seguro.

On December 11, 2020, the special program Conversa Preta, dedicated to debates on racism and representation and produced by black professionals from Rede Bahia, won the award for "best regional special program" among the attractions of this category produced by Rede Globo affiliates. The production was competing with programs from TV Sergipe (affiliate for the state of the same name) and Rede Amazônica (affiliate for the North Region). The first season of the program had aired in August of that year, and the second was shown between October and December 2021.

At the same event where the new programs of the station's news department for the second half of 2023 were announced, on September 28, TV Bahia also revealed the premiere of the program Timbrown. The attraction is a percussion competition in a reality show format, presented by singer Carlinhos Brown and journalist Luana Souza. The show premiered on November 11, on Rede Bahia and the subscription channel Multishow.

=== Special programming ===
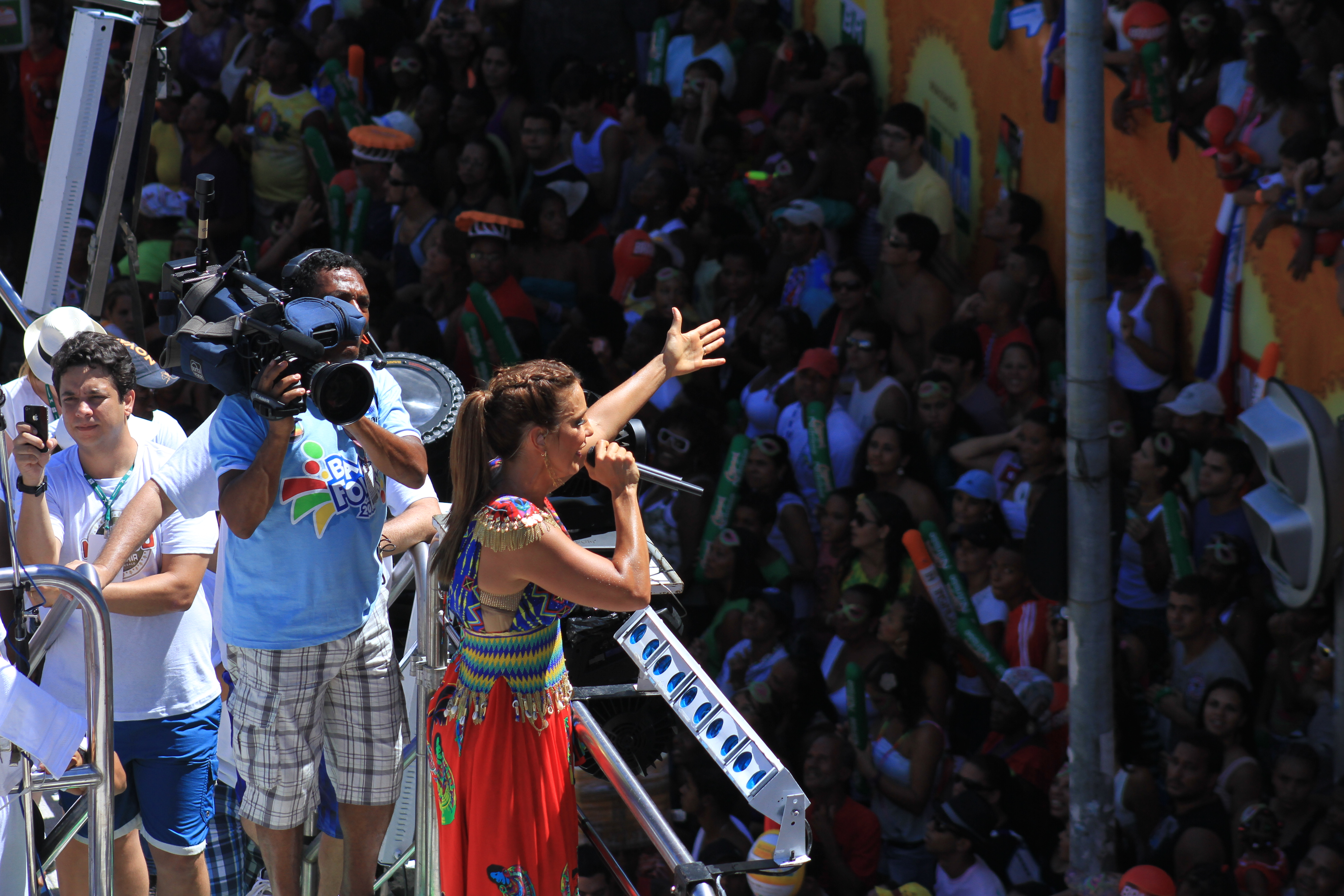
Cameraman for Bahia Folia during a Ivete Sangalo performance at Circuito Osmar, in Salvador.

TV Bahia annually covers the Carnival of Salvador in February or March, with the transmission of the special program Bahia Folia, preempting several TV Globo and local programs, in addition to participation in the national network shows. Since 1994, the station has been promoting the Bahia Folia Trophy, an award that elects the most successful hit of the Bahian Carnival by popular vote.

Between 1999 and 2014, the station also live broadcast the Salvador Summer Festival, promoted by iContent, which is a subsidiary of Rede Bahia. In 2015, the event started to be broadcast by the Canais Globo's entertainment subscription channel Multishow, but TV Bahia still promotes the event in its schedule, in addition to airing highlights of the event.

On February 16, 2023, TV Bahia supported the first broadcast of the Bahian Carnival by TV Globo. The performance of singer and presenter Ivete Sangalo was shown in the special program Trio Pipoca da Ivete, marking the opening of the festivities. The first 30 minutes of the parade on the Barra-Ondina circuit were broadcast nationally, while the affiliate continued to show the event until the beginning of the rerun of the soap opera O Rei do Gado on Vale a Pena Ver de Novo, as well as generating the broadcast for Globoplay. The recording of a scene from the soap opera Vai na Fé with Ivete and the character Lui Lorenzo, played by actor José Loreto, was also broadcast live on the station.

=== Sports programming ===
TV Bahia is currently responsible for locally produce part of the transmissions of the Bahia's soccer clubs' matches for the Brazil Cup and Brazilian Championship (A and B series), when Globo holds the broadcast rights of these competitions. The main sports broadcasting team of the network is composed of Thiago Mastroianni as sportscaster and commentary by Gustavo Castelucci, in addition to reports by Danilo Ribeiro, Renan Pinheiro, and Sérgio Pinheiro.

In the early days, local sports broadcasts on TV Bahia were made sporadically, when the Manchete and Globo networks held the rights to the competitions in which the local matches took place. In 1997, the Football Association of Bahia signed a contract to broadcast the Campeonato Baiano with SporTV, Globosat's sports pay TV channel. With the agreement, some of the matches had free broadcasting rights for the Globo affiliate. The rights of the Baianão followed with SporTV until 2005, and consequently the punctual broadcasts of some matches by the station also followed until this year. In 2006, due to a lack of agreement between the association and Globosat, the championship had no official television broadcast. The championship's presence on TV was limited to the exhibition of some matches by TVE Bahia (channel 10, then TV Cultura-affiliated public television station), and TV Salvador (channel 28, defunct independent that was part of Rede Bahia's local duopoly with TV Bahia).

TV Bahia acquired for the first time the broadcasting rights of the Campeonato Baiano in 2011, replacing TV Itapoan, which had been broadcasting it since 2007. In the first two months, the station registered a 30% increase in ratings in the time slot, where the Campeonato Paulista was shown. The stationcontinued to officially broadcast the competition until 2020, not having renewed the contract with the Football Association of Bahia for the following years. It was replaced by TVE Bahia, which became the official broadcasting station of the championship as of 2021.

On March 2, 2022, it was announced that TV Bahia, as well as pay-TV channels and streaming platforms of Grupo Globo, would broadcast matches of Vitória in the Brazilian Championship's C series. The club used a clause from its contract with the Rio de Janeiro-based conglomerate, based on the Lei do Mandante. With this agreement, the matches played in the Barradão would be broadcast exclusively by Globo outlets, including the affiliated stations of Rede Bahia de Televisão, while the other matches would remain with the DAZN service, which has the rights of the competition for 2022.

== News operation ==
TV Bahia currently broadcasts 23 hours, 20 minutes of locally produced newscasts each week (with 4 hours, 15 minutes each weekday and 2 hours, 5 minutes on Saturdays). The station also produces the 25-minute local sports show Globo Esporte Bahia, from Monday to Saturday, right after the newscast Bahia Meio Dia.

TV Bahia's news operation began with Bahia em Manchete, a newscast shown at 7:15 pm, which premiered on March 11, 1985, and was presented by Paulo Gil. In sports, the first program was Manchete Esportiva Bahia, with Ivan Pedro. A new program entered the station's schedule three months later: Bahia Debate, hosted by the then Rede Manchete journalist Ney Gonçalves Dias. In the program, which was shown on Thursdays, he interviewed the candidates for mayor of Salvador in the municipal election of that year. In July 1986, TV Bahia hired journalist Kátia Guzzo, presenter of variety program Mulher Total on then-SBT affiliate TV Itapoan (channel 5, now RecordTV Itapoan), to co-anchor Bahia Agora, the station's first noon newscast, accompanying journalist Paulo Brandão.

As a result of affiliating with Globo in January 1987, TV Bahia restructured its news operation to produce three daily newscasts. Paulo Gil remained host of the evening newscast, which was retitled BATV 2ª Edição on January 23. The BATV 3ª Edição premiered in the early morning, presented by Paulo Brandão. The noon newscast was rebranded BATV 1ª Edição the next day, presented by Cristina Barude. On the same day, Manchete Esportiva Bahia was replaced by the local block of Globo Esporte, lasting 3 minutes. TV Bahia's first morning production, Jornal da Manhã, hosted by Kátia Guzzo, debuted on January 26.

On January 27, 1989, a plane carrying a news team from TV Bahia, composed of reporter Anna Valéria, cameraman Robson Barros, and assistant Alberto Luciano Valente, crashed shortly after takeoff at the Bom Jesus da Lapa Airport, colliding with an abandoned house and a umbu tree, and caught fire. The team was returning to Salvador after covering, in Correntina, the burial of 18 victims of an accident between two trucks in Brasília. The aircraft was also carrying a team from the Correio da Bahia newspaper and state representative José Rocha. All eight occupants were injured, but none died.

Jornal da Manhã suffered its first anchor change four years after its premiere, in 1991, when Kátia Guzzo was replaced by Regina Coeli. The morning show gained a double presentation in 1993, when Regina was joined by Casemiro Neto. Jornal da Manhã and BATV 1ª Edição readopted the Bahia Agora name from 1993 to July 1995, when the title began to be used for a feature magazine hosted by Anna Valéria.

In 1993, TV Bahia news teams were involved in at least two polemic episodes related to former governor Nilo Coelho, already owner of TV Aratu. On May 21, 1993, reporter Robson do Val and cameraman Carlos Eduardo de Oliveira were covering Nilo's testimony at the Federal Police headquarters in Salvador. The politician was accused of having slandered the then candidate for governor ACM during an interview to TV Aratu on August 4, 1990. As Nilo was entering the PF headquarters, his lawyer, the former Bahia justice secretary Marcelo Duarte, pushed Carlos Eduardo, who unbalanced and fell down a ladder with the camera.

Also in the same day, while leaving the PF headquarters, Nilo Coelho ran over photographer Marcelo Tinoco, of Grupo TV Bahia-ownered newspaper Correio da Bahia. The former governor fled without giving any help. The incident was also recorded by the station, which dedicated a large part of that day's edition of BATV to the incident, including the repercussion of the case among members of the press and politicians in Bahia. On June 30, 1993, Nilo Coelho went to the 1st Police Station of Salvador to testify about the run over, and on that occasion three of Nilo's supporters - among them the mayor of Bom Jesus da Lapa Artur Maia and state deputy Calmito Fernandes - assaulted with kicks a TV Bahia crew, this time composed of Casemiro Neto, a cameraman and his assistant.

In 1994, the news coverage of TV Bahia became involved in new controversies due to the control of the station by the Magalhães family. After polls indicated the unpopularity of Salvador's public administration, Mayor Lídice da Mata, an opponent of governor ACM, criticized the station for showing news reports on the problems of the city's administration, especially those related to the situation of public transportation in the capital. According to the mayor's accusations, the coverage of the city's problems on the news was aimed at damaging her popularity by "brainwashing" the population. In 2001, news director Carlos Libório denied that TV Bahia had treated the manager unfairly, mentioning occasions when she received space for clarifications at the station.

Kátia Guzzo moved from BATV 1ª Edição to BATV 2ª Edição in 1996, when then-anchor Emmerson José opted to run for city council. On August 25, 1997, noon newscast Bahia Meio Dia premiered, replacing Bahia Agora and BATV 1ª Edição. The new newscast merged the two programs, being hosted by Anna Valéria, Casemiro Neto and Cristina Barude.

TV Bahia was the first television station in the state to use a helicopter for news coverage. The aircraft, which started to be used during the carnival coverage in February 1999, was called BahiaCop, and was used for live traffic bulletins, as well as reports and coverage that required aerial images. On August 29, 1999, TV Bahia premiered the information program Bahia Rural, with information about farming and cattle-raising and the interior of Bahia, presented by Valber Carvalho.

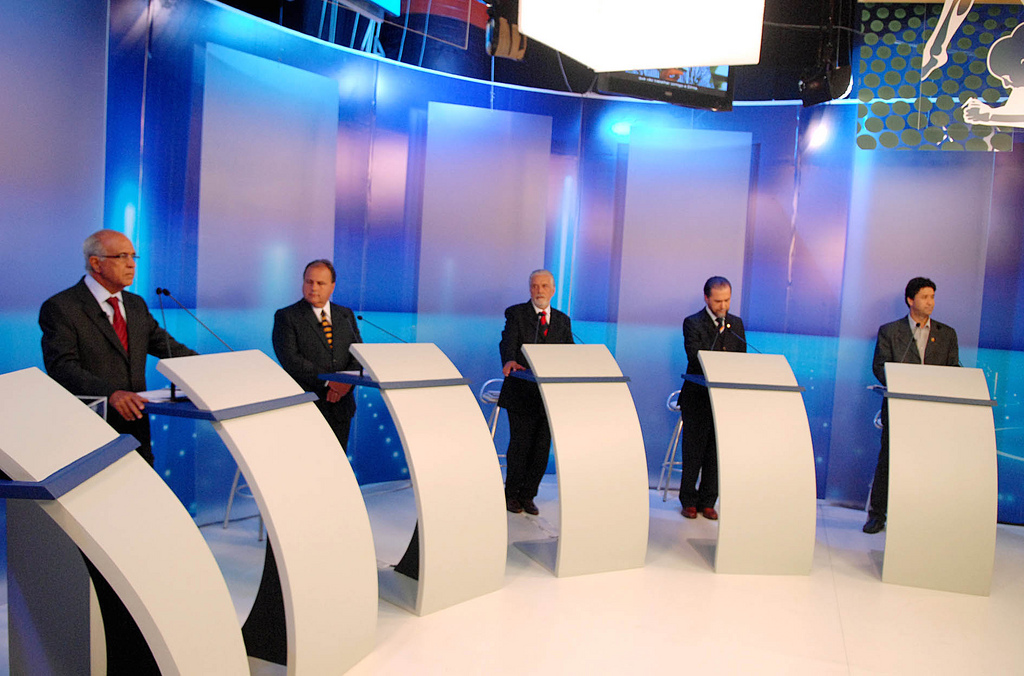
Election debate televised by TV Bahia among state government candidates in 2010

After 23 years leading the TV Bahia news department, journalist Carlos Libório retired on March 13, 2008; he was replaced as news director by Roberto Appel, former journalism manager at RBS TV. In the wake of the change in leadership, several changes in format were made, most notably the introduction of a two-anchor format to BATV; Guzzo was paired with Jefferson Beltrão, who moved from TV Itapoan. The pairing continued until 2015, when Beltrão was dismissed and Guzzo, who shifted to producing special reports for TV Bahia, who left the newscast after 19 years and became a special reporter for the station 1 month later. was replaced with Camila Marinho.

On July 21, 2012, Nelson Pelegrino, a candidate for mayor of Salvador, filed a lawsuit claiming that a report on the anniversary of Magalhães's death the previous's day featuring an interview with ACM Neto — his grandson, son of ACM Júnior, and a rival candidate — unfairly benefited Neto. On August 3, however, the Electoral Court of Brazil ruled the accusation as unfounded. According to Ângela Bacellar Batista, judge of the 18th Electoral Zone, there was no breach of equality before the law, as Mário Kertész, who was running for the same position, was also interviewed for the same report.

"The simple fact that the TV station is owned by the candidate's family does not imply an offense to the principle of isonomy and, in this case, the report is included within the freedom of the press, essential to the democratic rule of law, whose dissemination of the manifestation of those present at the ceremony, purpose of the report, cannot be confused with the prohibition of article 45 of Law 9,504/97".

— Ângela Bacellar Batista

During the carnival of 2014, TV Bahia again debuted a helicopter for news coverage, debuting RedeCop. The aircraft provided services to the station until June 30, 2016, when TV Bahia's contract with the São Paulo-based company Time News, responsible for the equipment, was terminated. Like other affiliates that aired local programming right after Fantástico on Sundays, the last edition of Rede Bahia Revista, produced since 1998, was aired on January 18, 2015. The program left the schedule due to changes in Rede Globo's programming for the time slot.

As a result of increased competition from RecordTV Itapoan during the exhibition of early afternoon program Balanço Geral BA, several changes were made. News director Appel retired and was replaced by Eurico Meira da Costa, who had held the same post at NSC TV, the Globo affiliate in Santa Catarina. In response, TV Bahia hired Jessica Senra from RecordTV Itapoan to host a revamped Bahia Meio Dia, which resulted in an immediate increase in ratings. Another action to improve the channel's midday ratings was taken on November 26, 2018, with the removal of Globo's health program Bem Estar from the weekly schedule to expand Bahia Meio Dia; as a result, it began airing 15 to 30 minutes earlier than similar newscasts on other Rede Globo affiliates. The station noted that low ratings for Globo network programming were harming its own local newscast. 2018 also saw the debut of a Saturday morning newscast, Bom Dia Sábado.

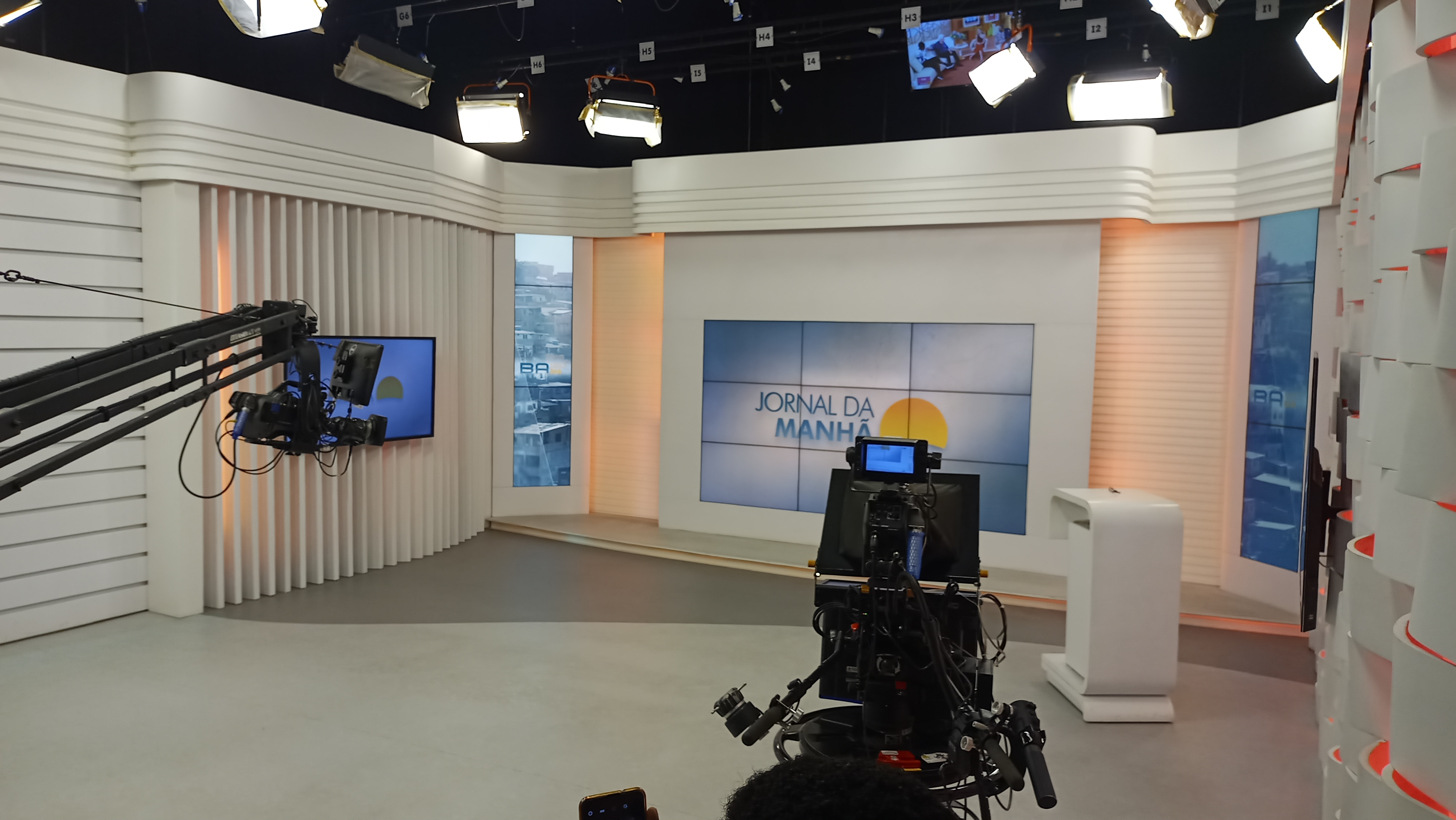
TV Bahia's journalism studio, debuted in 2019.

On February 26, 2018, the station committed a gaffe when it accidentally showed the body of a dead man during a report on Jornal da Manhã, which station policy typically prohibits. It appeared in the background of a live report for 40 seconds until it was spotted and reporter Vanderson Nascimento was alerted to position himself to block the corpse. João Gomes, then executive director of television at Rede Bahia, classified the event as a "human error" and further stated that the incident was not an attempt to gain ratings, citing TV Bahia's number-one position in that timeslot.

After two decades with the station hosting Bahia Rural, Valber Carvalho left TV Bahia in 2019, with the program being hosted by two former reporters, Georgina Maynart and station veteran José Raimundo. Raimundo would leave TV Bahia in 2021 after 31 years.

On December 12, 2021, Camila Marinho, accompanied by cameraman Cleriston Santana, was attacked by supporters and members of president Jair Bolsonaro's security team as she tried to cover his visit to the city of Itamaraju, in the far southern of Bahia, due to heavy rains that wreaked havoc in the city and in the region. Her microphone was damaged by the municipality's secretary of works, Antonio Charbel, and she was also the victim of an attempted rear naked choke hold by one of the security guards, in addition to having a fanny pack stolen. Reporters Xico Lopes and Dário Cerqueira, from TV Aratu, were with TV Bahia reporters and were also attacked. The events were reported on TV Globo's national news programs, and the network repudiated the attacks on both teams. Rede Bahia also released a statement denouncing the action.

On September 28, 2023, TV Bahia announced, at a Rede Bahia event for the market, the premiere of the programs Onde Tem Bahia, presented by reporter Eduardo Oliveira, and Diga Aí, presented by Jessica Senra. The first program, which highlights Bahia's exports, premiered on October 1 and was shown after Fantástico in two episodes. Jessica's program, on the other hand, is a talk show with an auditorium, which premiered on November 26.

=== Notable on-air staff ===
==== Current ====
- Fernando Sodake

==== Former ====
- Carlos Viana
- Casemiro Neto
- Emmerson José
- Giácomo Mancini
- Jessica Senra
- Paulo Gil (deceased)
- Ricardo Fontes Mendes
- Thiago Mastroianni
- Wanda Chase (deceased)

== Technical information ==
=== Subchannels ===
Channel	Video	Aspect	Short name	Programming
11.1	1080i	16:9	TV BAHIA	Main TV Bahia programming / TV Globo

=== Analog-to-digital conversion ===
In November 2008, TV Bahia started its digital transmissions in high definition (HD) on an experimental basis on UHF channel 29. Digital broadcasts officially started on December 1, making the station a pioneer in terrestrial digital transmissions in the Northeast Region of Brazil and the capital of Bahia the seventh city to receive digital television in Brazil, exactly one year after the official launch in the country. On November 25, 2013, it began broadcasting its local newscasts in HDTV.

TV Bahia shut down its analog signal, over VHF channel 11, on September 27, 2017, as part of the federally mandated transition from analog to digital television. The station's digital signal remains on its pre-transition UHF channel 29, using virtual channel 11. The station did the local generation of the final match of the Copa do Brasil that year, narrated by Thiago Mastroianni, as well as live entries from the station's master control with reporter Giana Mattiazzi, who showed the signal being interrupted at 11:59 pm, after the end of the match, and began to broadcast a notice from the a notice from the Ministry of Science, Technology, Innovation and Communications (Brazil) (MCTIC) and ANATEL about the switch-off.

== See also ==
- Rede Bahia de Televisão
- TV Globo
