= Emissoras Pioneiras de Televisão =

Brazilian regional television network

EPTV
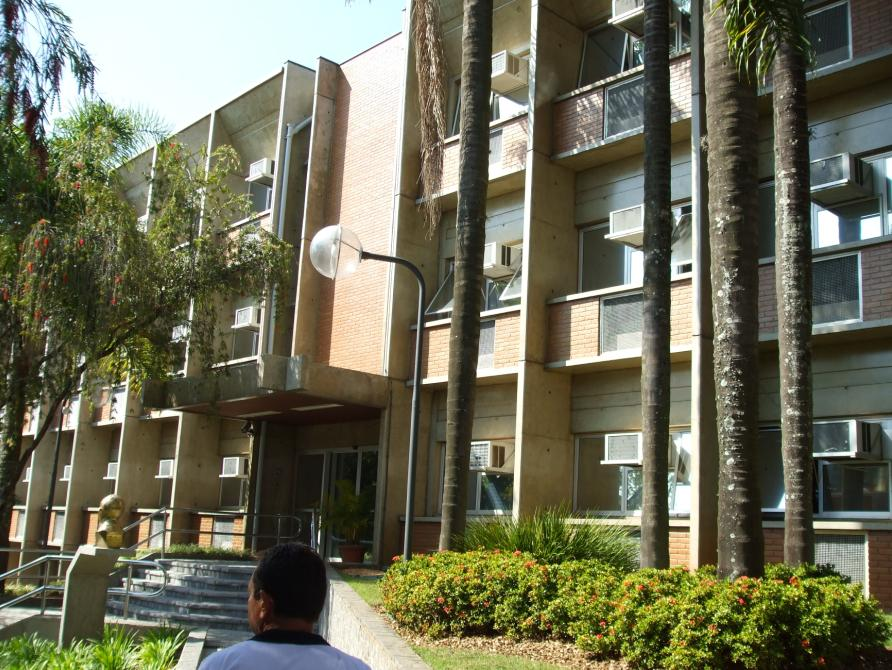
- Type: Broadcast television network
- Country: Brazil
- Availability: Campinas, Ribeirão Preto, São Carlos and Varginha
- Founded: 1 October 1979 by José Bonifácio Coutinho Nogueira
- Launch date: 1 October 1979
- Former names: TV Campinas (1979-1989), TV Ribeirão (1980-1989), TV Sul de Minas (1988-1989)
- Callsign meaning: Emissoras Pioneiras de Televisão
- Affiliation(s): TV Globo (1979-)
- Group: Emissoras Pioneiras de Televisão (Empresas Paulistas de Televisão S/A)

Emissoras Pioneiras de Televisão (Pioneer Television Stations, in English), best known as EPTV, is a Brazilian network that is affiliated with TV Globo. The network has four stations: three in São Paulo and one in Minas Gerais.

The group received construction permits for channel 12 in Campinas (station started October 1, 1979) and channel 7 in Ribeirão Preto (station started 1980) in the mid-1970s, with the company being known as Empresa Paulista de Televisão Ltda. (Paulistan Television Company).

== Stations ==
Name	Call sign	Digital channel Virtual channel	City	State	First air date	ANATEL ID
EPTV Campinas	ZYB 859	25/12.1	Campinas	São Paulo	1 November 1979	57dbab84a4e68
EPTV Ribeirão	ZYB 860	25/7.1	Ribeirão Preto	São Paulo	12 November 1980	57dbab83c1852
EPTV Central	ZYB 870	25/6.1	São Carlos	São Paulo	1 July 1989 (Note: ZYB 870 began transmitting on 1 July 1989 as a translator of ZYB 869; it became a separate station on 25 January 1991.)	57dbab93b46a4
EPTV Sul de Minas	ZYA 732	42/5.1	Varginha	Minas Gerais	8 August 1988	57dbaad41aadc

== Local programs ==
- Bom Dia Cidade (local version of Bom Dia Brasil)
- Jornal da EPTV
- Globo Esporte SP/MG (local version of Globo Esporte)
