= List of TV Globo affiliates =

This is a list that contains the stations, owned-and-operated stations and affiliates, that relay the programming of TV Globo. Aside those, the list also contains its international affiliates (TV Globo Internacional's network) and the network's former affiliates, with their current affiliations and statuses.

== Owned-and-operated stations ==
The five owned-and-operated stations are known within the network as G5.

Station	City	State	Channel	Callsign	Operated since
TV Globo Rio	Rio de Janeiro	Rio de Janeiro	4 (29)	ZYB 511	1965
TV Globo São Paulo	São Paulo	São Paulo	5 (18)	ZYB 850	1966
TV Globo Minas	Belo Horizonte	Minas Gerais	12 (33)	ZYA 722	1968
TV Globo DF	Brasília	Distrito Federal	10 (21)	ZYA 508	1971
TV Globo Pernambuco	Recife	Pernambuco	13 (36)	ZYB 302	1972

== Affiliates ==
=== Acre ===
Grupo	Station	City	Channel	Callsign	Affiliate since
Grupo Rede Amazônica	Rede Amazônica Rio Branco	Rio Branco	4 (14)	ZYA 200	1982
Grupo Rede Amazônica	Rede Amazônica Cruzeiro do Sul	Cruzeiro do Sul	5 (22)	RTV	1985

=== Alagoas ===
Grupo	Station	City	Channel	Callsign	Affiliate since
Grupo Asa Branca	TV Asa Branca Alagoas	Maceió	28	ZYP 330	2025

=== Amapá ===
Grupo	Station	City	Channel	Callsign	Affiliate since
Grupo Rede Amazônica	Rede Amazônica Macapá	Macapá	6 (28)	ZYA 285	1982

=== Amazonas ===
Grupo	Station	City	Channel	Callsign	Affiliate since
Grupo Rede Amazônica	Rede Amazônica Manaus	Manaus	5 (15)	ZYA 247	1986
Grupo Rede Amazônica	Rede Amazônica Parintins	Parintins	7 (15)	RTV	1986
Grupo Rede Amazônica	Rede Amazônica Itacoatiara	Itacoatiara	11 (16)	RTV	1986
Grupo Rede Amazônica	Rede Amazônica Humaitá	Humaitá	6 (15)	RTV	1986
Grupo Rede Amazônica	Rede Amazônica Manacapuru	Manacapuru	12 (16)	RTV	1986
Grupo Rede Amazônica	Rede Amazônica Coari	Coari	3 (15)	RTV	2005

=== Bahia ===
Grupo	Station	City	Channel	Callsign	Affiliate since
Rede Bahia	TV Bahia	Salvador	11 (29)	ZYA 298	1987
Rede Bahia	TV Sudoeste	Vitória da Conquista	5 (28)	ZYQ 804	1990
Rede Bahia	TV São Francisco	Juazeiro	7 (28)	ZYQ 801	1990
Rede Bahia	TV Oeste	Barreiras	5 (29)	ZYP 287	1991
Rede Bahia	TV Santa Cruz	Itabuna	4 (30)	ZYA 302	1988
Rede Bahia; Grupo Modesto Cerqueira	TV Subaé	Feira de Santana	10 (27)	ZYA 301	1988

=== Ceará ===
Grupo	Station	City	Channel	Callsign	Affiliate since
Sistema Verdes Mares	TV Verdes Mares	Fortaleza	10 (33)	ZYA 425	1970
Sistema Verdes Mares	TV Verdes Mares Cariri	Juazeiro do Norte	9 (33)	ZYA 437	2009

=== Espírito Santo ===
Grupo	Station	City	Channel	Callsign	Affiliate since
Rede Gazeta de Comunicações	TV Gazeta Vitória	Vitória	4 (22)	ZYA 530	1976
Rede Gazeta de Comunicações	TV Gazeta Norte	Linhares	5 (23)	ZYA 536	1997
Rede Gazeta de Comunicações	TV Gazeta Sul	Cachoeiro de Itapemirim	10 (21)	ZYA 534	1988
Rede Gazeta de Comunicações	TV Gazeta Noroeste	Colatina	9 (24)	ZYA 543	2006

=== Goiás ===
Grupo	Station	City	Channel	Callsign	Affiliate since
Grupo Jaime Câmara	TV Anhanguera Goiânia	Goiânia	2 (34)	ZYP 327	1968
Grupo Jaime Câmara	TV Anhanguera Anápolis	Anápolis	7 (33)	ZYA 573	1980
Grupo Jaime Câmara	TV Anhanguera Catalão	Catalão	7 (34)	ZYP 317	1995
Grupo Jaime Câmara	TV Anhanguera Itumbiara	Itumbiara	11 (16)	ZYP 315	1997
Grupo Jaime Câmara	TV Anhanguera Jataí	Jataí	2 (34)	ZYP 294	2005
Grupo Jaime Câmara	TV Anhanguera Luziânia	Luziânia	22 (16)	ZYP 301	1995
Grupo Jaime Câmara	TV Anhanguera Porangatu	Porangatu	12 (34)	ZYP 282	2004
Grupo Jaime Câmara	TV Anhanguera Rio Verde	Rio Verde	12 (30)	ZYA 578	1990

=== Maranhão ===
Grupo	Station	City	Channel	Callsign	Affiliate since
Grupo Mirante	TV Mirante São Luís	São Luís	10 (29)	ZYP 141	1991
Grupo Mirante	TV Mirante Imperatriz	Imperatriz	10 (29)	ZYP 145	1975
Grupo Mirante	TV Mirante Cocais	Caxias / Codó	9 (29)	ZYA 653	1988
Grupo Mirante	TV Mirante Balsas	Balsas	32	ZYA 652	1989

=== Mato Grosso ===
Grupo	Station	City	Channel	Callsign	Affiliate since
Rede Matogrossense de Comunicação	TV Centro América	Cuiabá	4 (36)	ZYA 941	1976
Rede Matogrossense de Comunicação	TV Centro América Sul	Rondonópolis	12 (36)	ZYA 952	1989
Rede Matogrossense de Comunicação	TV Centro América Norte	Sinop	5 (31)	ZYA 953	1994
Rede Matogrossense de Comunicação	TV Centro América Tangará da Serra	Tangará da Serra	13 (36)	RTV	1997

=== Mato Grosso do Sul ===
Grupo	Station	City	Channel	Callsign	Affiliate since
Rede Matogrossense de Comunicação	TV Morena	Campo Grande	6 (30)	ZYA 942	1976
Rede Matogrossense de Comunicação	TV Morena Corumbá	Corumbá	5 (31)	ZYA 940	1976
Rede Matogrossense de Comunicação	TV Morena Ponta Porã	Ponta Porã	4 (30)	ZYA 947	1989

=== Minas Gerais ===
Grupo	Station	City	Channel	Callsign	Affiliate since
Rede Integração	TV Integração Uberlândia	Uberlândia	8 (30)	ZYA 724	1971
Rede Integração	TV Integração Ituiutaba	Ituiutaba	5 (30)	ZYA 737	1988
Rede Integração	TV Integração Araxá	Divinópolis / Araxá	8 (30)	ZYA 738	1991
Rede Integração	TV Integração Juiz de Fora	Juiz de Fora	5 (30)	ZYA 725	1980
Rede Integração	TV Integração Uberaba	Uberaba	3 (39)	ZYP 296	2016
Grupo EP	EPTV Sul de Minas	Varginha	5 (42)	ZYA 732	1988
Rede InterTV	InterTV Grande Minas	Montes Claros	4 (20)	ZYA 728	1987
Rede InterTV	InterTV dos Vales	Governador Valadares / Coronel Fabriciano	11 (22) / 22	ZYA 747	2008

=== Pará ===
Grupo	Station	City	Channel	Callsign	Affiliate since
Grupo Liberal	TV Liberal Belém	Belém	7 (21)	ZYB 222	1976
Grupo Liberal	TV Liberal Altamira	Altamira	13 (21)	RTV	1993
Grupo Liberal	TV Liberal Castanhal	Castanhal	11 (49)	RTV	1989
Grupo Liberal	TV Liberal Marabá	Marabá	5 (43)	RTV	1988
Grupo Liberal	TV Liberal Paragominas	Paragominas	8 (21)	RTV	No info
Grupo Liberal	TV Liberal Parauapebas	Parauapebas	12 (21)	RTV	1996
Grupo Liberal	TV Liberal Redenção	Redenção	9 (21)	RTV	No info
Sistema Tapajós de Comunicação	TV Tapajós	Santarém	4 (22)	ZYB 223	1979

=== Paraíba ===
Grupo	Station	City	Channel	Callsign	Affiliate since
Rede Paraíba de Comunicação	TV Cabo Branco	João Pessoa	7 (19)	ZYB 270	1987
Rede Paraíba de Comunicação	TV Paraíba	Campina Grande	3 (21)	ZYB 271	1987

=== Paraná ===
Grupo	Station	City	Channel	Callsign	Affiliate since
Mariano Lemanski	RPC Curitiba	Curitiba	12 (41)	ZYB 391	1976
Mariano Lemanski	RPC Londrina	Londrina	3 (42)	ZYB 392	1979
Mariano Lemanski	RPC Maringá	Maringá	8 (41)	ZYB 396	1976
Mariano Lemanski	RPC Ponta Grossa	Ponta Grossa	7 (42)	ZYB 394	1992
Mariano Lemanski	RPC Guarapuava	Guarapuava	2 (32)	ZYB 409	2000
Mariano Lemanski	RPC Paranavaí	Paranavaí	29 (42)	ZYB 411	1997
Mariano Lemanski	RPC Foz do Iguaçu	Foz do Iguaçu	5 (35)	ZYB 408	1989
Mariano Lemanski	RPC Cascavel	Cascavel	10 (32)	ZYB 402	2000

=== Pernambuco ===
Grupo	Station	City	Channel	Callsign	Affiliate since
Grupo Asa Branca	TV Asa Branca	Caruaru	8 (17)	ZYB 305	1991
Sistema Grande Rio de Comunicação	TV Grande Rio	Petrolina	19 (18)	ZYB 304	1991

=== Piauí ===
Grupo	Station	City	Channel	Callsign	Affiliate since
Sistema Clube de Comunicação	TV Clube	Teresina	4 (26)	ZYB 350	1976
Sistema Clube de Comunicação	TV Alvorada	Floriano	6 (25)	ZYB 354	1997

=== Rio de Janeiro ===
Grupo	Station	City	Channel	Callsign	Affiliate since
Rede InterTV	InterTV Alto Litoral	Cabo Frio	8 (33)	ZYB 521	1989
Rede InterTV	InterTV Serra+Mar	Nova Friburgo	12 (30)	ZYB 522	1990
Rede InterTV; Grupo Folha de Comunicação	InterTV Planície	Campos dos Goytacazes	8 (36)	ZYB 520	2004
Rabbit Participação e Administrações Ltda.	TV Rio Sul	Resende	13 (28)	ZYB 524	1990

=== Rio Grande do Norte ===
Grupo	Station	City	Channel	Callsign	Affiliate since
Rede InterTV; Sistema Tribuna de Comunicação	InterTV Cabugi	Natal	11 (34)	ZYB 562	1987
Rede InterTV; Sistema Tribuna de Comunicação	InterTV Costa Branca	Mossoró	18 (47)	ZYP 298	2015

=== Rio Grande do Sul ===
Grupo	Station	City	Channel	Callsign	Affiliate since
Grupo RBS	RBS TV Porto Alegre	Porto Alegre	12 (34)	ZYP 100	1967
Grupo RBS	RBS TV Bagé	Bagé	6 (34)	ZYB 610	1977
Grupo RBS	RBS TV Caxias do Sul	Caxias do Sul	8 (33)	ZYB 615	1969
Grupo RBS	RBS TV Cruz Alta	Cruz Alta	3 (33)	ZYB 623	1979
Grupo RBS	RBS TV Erechim	Erechim	2 (33)	ZYB 620	1972
Grupo RBS	RBS TV Passo Fundo	Passo Fundo	7 (34)	ZYB 626	1980
Grupo RBS	RBS TV Pelotas	Pelotas	4 (34)	ZYB 617	1972
Grupo RBS	RBS TV Rio Grande	Rio Grande	9 (33)	ZYP 298	1977
Grupo RBS	RBS TV dos Vales	Santa Cruz do Sul	6 (33)	ZYB 635	1988
Grupo RBS	RBS TV Santa Maria	Santa Maria	12 (34)	ZYB 611	1969
Grupo RBS	RBS TV Santa Rosa	Santa Rosa	6 (34)	ZYB 629	1992
Grupo RBS	RBS TV Uruguaiana	Uruguaiana	13 (34)	ZYP 107	1974

=== Rondônia ===
Grupo	Station	City	Channel	Callsign	Affiliate since
Grupo Rede Amazônica	Rede Amazônica Porto Velho	Porto Velho	4 (14)	ZYP 264	1982
Grupo Rede Amazônica	Rede Amazônica Ariquemes	Ariquemes	7 (14)	RTV	1982
Grupo Rede Amazônica	Rede Amazônica Cacoal	Cacoal	5 (21)	RTV	1982
Grupo Rede Amazônica	Rede Amazônica Ji-Paraná	Ji-Paraná	5 (15)	RTV	1982
Grupo Rede Amazônica	Rede Amazônica Vilhena	Vilhena	5 (15)	RTV	1982

=== Roraima ===
Grupo	Station	City	Channel	Callsign	Affiliate since
Grupo Rede Amazônica	Rede Amazônica Boa Vista	Boa Vista	4 (17)	ZYB 600	1982
Grupo Rede Amazônica	Rede Amazônica Rorainópolis	Rorainópolis	11 (18)	RTV	2003

=== Santa Catarina ===
Grupo	Station	City	Channel	Callsign	Affiliate since
NSC Comunicação	NSC TV Florianópolis	Florianópolis	12 (33)	ZYB 763	1979
NSC Comunicação	NSC TV Blumenau	Blumenau	3 (34)	ZYB 760	1980
NSC Comunicação	NSC TV Centro-Oeste	Joaçaba	6 (34)	ZYB 770	2005
NSC Comunicação	NSC TV Chapecó	Chapecó	12 (33)	ZYQ 651	1982
NSC Comunicação	NSC TV Criciúma	Criciúma	9 (34)	ZYB 762	1995
NSC Comunicação	NSC TV Joinville	Joinville	5 (33)	ZYB 765	1979

=== São Paulo ===
Grupo	Station	City	Channel	Callsign	Affiliate since
Grupo Diário	TV Diário	Mogi das Cruzes	19	ZYB 901	2000
Grupo EP	EPTV Campinas	Campinas	12 (25)	ZYB 859	1979
Grupo EP	EPTV Central	São Carlos	6 (25)	ZYB 870	1991
Grupo EP	EPTV Ribeirão	Ribeirão Preto	7 (25)	ZYB 860	1980
Traffic	TV TEM Bauru	Bauru	26	ZYB 856	1966
Traffic	TV TEM Itapetininga	Itapetininga	26	ZYB 897	2003
Traffic	TV TEM São José do Rio Preto	São José do Rio Preto	26	ZYB 866	1986
Traffic	TV TEM Sorocaba	Sorocaba	26	ZYB 873	1990
Grupo Tribuna	TV Tribuna	Santos	18 (19)	ZYB 883	1992
Rede Vanguarda	TV Vanguarda São José dos Campos	São José dos Campos	17 (16)	ZYB 869	1988
Rede Vanguarda	TV Vanguarda Taubaté	Taubaté	3 (28)	ZYB 899	2003

=== Sergipe ===
Grupo	Station	City	Channel	Callsign	Affiliate since
Rádio Televisão de Sergipe	TV Sergipe	Aracaju	4 (33)	ZYB 830	1973

=== Tocantins ===
Grupo	Station	City	Channel	Callsign	Affiliate since
Grupo Jaime Câmara	TV Anhanguera Palmas	Palmas	11 (23)	ZYP 328	2005
Grupo Jaime Câmara	TV Anhanguera Araguaína	Araguaína	11 (24)	ZYP 316	1976
Grupo Jaime Câmara	TV Anhanguera Gurupi	Gurupi	11 (23)	ZYP 321	1977

== Via satellite ==
=== Star One D2 Analog (C band) ===
- Channel: 1
- BW filter: 27 MHz
- Frequency: 3720 MHz (1430 MHz L band)
- Position: 70º West
- Polarization: Horizontal
- Foundation: December 31, 1982
- Notes: It was switched off on August 18, 2024.

=== Star One D2 Digital (C band) ===
- Channel: Variable
- Frequency: Varied for each affiliate disponible on SAT HD Regional
- Polarization: Vertical or horizontal (depending on the affiliate)
- Notes: Deactivated for direct reception by viewers on March 30, 2025, becoming encoded and made available only for internal use by TV stations.
- 16 O&O and affiliates television satellite stations

=== Star One D2 Digital (Ku band) ===
- Channel: 5
- 34 O&O and affiliates television satellite stations

=== Sky Brasil-1 Digital (Ku band) ===
- Channel: 5
- 31 O&O and affiliates television satellite stations

Digital satellite dish users can only access the TV Globo signal through the SAT HD Regional and Nova Parabólica free-to-view systems, which requires a decoding card. Depending on the region where the user is located, the distribution of the local affiliate signal that charges that location does not have a terrestrial signal. On the contrary, the signal of another station is available.

== International coverage ==
Station	Country	Operated since
TV Globo Internacional	Abroad	1999
Globo Now	Portugal	2007
Globo	Portugal	2012
Globo On	Angola	2015
Globo On	Mozambique	2015

== Former affiliates ==
Name	City	Federative unit	Channel	Current situation/affiliation	Affiliation period
TV Gazeta de Alagoas	Maceió	Alagoas	7	Independent	1975–2025
TV Fronteira Paulista	Presidente Prudente	SP	13	Became independent after losing its affiliation contract after a political scandal involving senator Paulo Lima, who, in turn, owns the station, now a Jovem Pan affiliate	1994–2025
Rede Amazônica Jaru	Jaru	RO	10	Defunct	1983–2023
Rede Amazônica Guajará-Mirim	Guajará-Mirim	RO	3	Defunct	1983–2022
Rede Amazônica Tefé	Tefé	AM	6	Defunct	1986–2021
Rede Amazônica Tabatinga	Tabatinga	AM	4	Defunct	1986–2021
Rede Amazônica Boca do Acre	Boca do Acre	AM	5	Defunct	1986–2021
TV Liberal Itaituba	Itaituba	PA	13	Defunct	1993–2019
TV Liberal Tucuruí	Tucuruí	PA	7	Defunct	1987–2019
TV Nova Era	Colinas	MA	13	Rede Bandeirantes	1997–2018
TV Mirante Santa Inês	Santa Inês	MA	13	Defunct	1992–1999; 2002–2017
TV Mirante Açailândia	Açailândia	MA	3	Defunct	2006–2016
TV Cidade	Pedreiras	MA	11	Defunct	1998–2015
TV Rio Turiaçu	Santa Helena	MA	11	Record	2011–2013
TV Mirante Chapadinha	Chapadinha	MA	7	Defunct	1998–2013
TV Golfinho	Fernando de Noronha	PE	11	TV Nova (TV Cultura)	1985–2010
TV Serra Sul	Canaã dos Carajás	PA	12	TV A Crítica	????-2008
TV Leste	Governador Valadares	MG	3	Record	1987–2008
TV Pericumã	Pinheiro	MA	5	Record	1998–2003
TV Local	Santa Helena	MA	11	Defunct	1991–????
TV Maranhão Central	Santa Inês	MA	10	Now Rede Mais Família, independent network	1999–2002
TV Cocais	Caxias	MA	8	Defunct	1995–2001
TV Altamira	Altamira	PA	6	Rede Cultura do Pará (TV Cultura)	1982–1997
TV Norte Fluminense	Campos dos Goytacazes	RJ	12	Now Record Interior RJ, Record O&O	1981–1995
TV Difusora	São Luís	MA	4	SBT	1972–1991
TV Aratu	Salvador	BA	4	SBT	1969–1987
TV Marabá	Marabá	PA	13	Defunct	1976–1987
TV Borborema	Campina Grande	PB	9	SBT	1980–1986
Boas Novas Manaus	Manaus	AM	8	Now Boas Novas Manaus, Boas Novas O&O	1971–1986
TV Itaituba	Itaituba	PA	6	Shut down due to lack of license from DENTEL; Now TV Eldorado, Rede Bandeirantes affiliate	1980–1985
TV Tropical	Londrina	PR	7	Now CNT Tropical, CNT O&O	1979
Boas Novas Belém	Belém	PA	4	Now Boas Novas Belém, Boas Novas O&O	1967–1976
TV Iguaçu	Curitiba	PR	4	SBT	1972–1976
TV Tibagi	Apucarana	PR	11	SBT	1972–1976
TV Jornal	Recife	PE	2	SBT	1969–1972
TV Nacional	Brasília	DF	2	Now TV Brasil Capital, TV Brasil O&O	1967–1969

=== International affiliates ===
Name	Country	Current situation/affiliation	Affiliation period
IPCTV	Japan	Defunct, was TV Globo Internacional relayer at closing time	1995–2019
Telemontecarlo	Italy	Foreign partner, later sold, now La7	1985–1994
