= Liberal =

Liberal or liberalism may refer to:

== Politics ==
- A supporter of the liberalism political philosophy
  - Social liberal, referred to as "liberal" in the United States and elsewhere
  - Classical liberal
  - Neoliberal
  - Religious liberalism
    - Liberal Christianity
    - Liberalism and progressivism within Islam
    - Liberal Judaism (disambiguation)
- A supporter of the liberalist approach to international relations
- A member of a "Liberal party" (see also: Liberal parties by country)

== Arts, entertainment and media ==
- El Liberal, a Spanish newspaper published 1879–1936
- The Liberal, a British political magazine published 2004–2012
- Liberalism (book), a 1927 book by Ludwig von Mises
- "Liberal", a song by Band-Maid from the 2019 album Conqueror
- TV Liberal Belém, a television station in Belém, Brazil
- O Liberal, a newspaper published in Belém, Brazil

== Places in the United States ==
- Liberal, Indiana
- Liberal, Kansas
- Liberal, Missouri
- Liberal, Oregon

== People ==
- Daniel Liberal (born 2000), Angolan footballer
- Julia Liberal Liberal (born 1967), Spanish politician

== Other uses ==
- Brazilian ship Liberal, ships of the Brazilian Navy

== See also ==
- Liberal arts (disambiguation)
- The Liberal Wars, a civil war in Portugal in the early 19th century
