= Record Belém =

Record Belém (ZYB 204)
- Belém, Pará; Brazil
- Channels: Digital: 22 (UHF); Virtual: 10

Programming
- Affiliations: Record (1997–present)

Ownership
- Owner: Grupo Record; (Rádio e Televisão Marajoara Ltda.)

History
- First air date: June 10, 1997
- Former names: TV Record Pará (1997–2008); TV Record Norte (2008–2009); RecordTV Belém (2016–2023)
- Former channel numbers: Analog: 10 (VHF, 1997–2018)

Technical information
- Licensing authority: ANATEL
- ERP: 6 kW
- Transmitter coordinates: 1°27′44.9″S 48°29′30.7″W

Links
- Public license information: Profile
- Website: https://record.r7.com/record-emissoras/norte/record-belem/

Record Belém (channel 10) is a Brazilian broadcast television station in Belém founded on June 10, 1997.

== History ==
The license for VHF channel 10 in Belém was granted on August 19, 1988 for politician Jader Barbalho, at the time Minister of Social Security in José Sarney's government, through a company formed by his wife Elcione Barbalho and radio personality and businessman Carlos Santos. In 1990, Barbalho acquired RBA TV from the family assets of businessman Jair Bernardino, who had died in an air accident, and having a television station already operational, he left aside the implementation of the channel 10 license, which remained under the possibility of Carlos Santos.

During the 90s, Santos tried to bring the station on air, investing in equipment and renting rooms in the Manoel Pinto da Silva Building (where the studios of TV Guajará and SBT Belém had also been located), however due to several technical and administrative problems, he didn't bring the project ahead. With just under a year left before the deadline for installing the station was up, Carlos Santos negotiated the concession and the entire structure he had already set up with the businessman and leader of the Universal Church of the Kingdom of God, Edir Macedo, owner of Rede Record. In 1995, both Edir Macedo and the Assembly of God bid for the takeover of TV Guajará (channel 4). Macedo's bid to convert the station (a Record affiliate) to a Record O&O was ultimately defeated as it bid US$2.7 million against the Assembly of God's US$3.5 million. As a consequence, thanks to Record's connections to the UCKG, Boas Novas Belém ceased its affiliation with Record and affiliated with CNT. In November 1995, after months of negotiation, Central Record de Comunicação agreed to pay R$3.5 million for the structure, less R$500 mil than what the businessman initially wanted. With the transaction, the station became the sixteenth owned by Edir Macedo, equalling the amount of television stations owned by Grupo RBS.

== Record Belém programs ==
- Balanço Geral PA Manhã (morning news)
- Fala Pará (morning news)
- Balanço Geral PA (afternoon news)
- Cidade Alerta Pará (afternoon news)
- Pará Record (night news)
- Balanço Geral PA Especial (Saturday)

== Retransmitters ==
- Almeirim – 6 VHF
- Anajás – 10 VHF
- Bom Jesus do Tocantins – 8 VHF
- Curionópolis – 27 UHF
- Capitão Poço – 13 VHF
- Redenção – 11 VHF
- Tailândia – 11 VHF
- Santana do Araguaia – 11 VHF
- Cametá – 26 UHF
- Itupiranga – 27 UHF
