= TV Mirante Imperatriz =

TV Mirante Imperatriz (ZYP 145)
- Imperatriz, Maranhão; Brazil
- Channels: Digital: 29 (UHF); Virtual: 10
- Branding: TV Mirante

Programming
- Affiliations: TV Globo

Ownership
- Owner: Grupo Mirante; (Rádio Mirante do Maranhão Ltda.)

History
- Founded: 1975
- First air date: December 25, 1975
- Former call signs: ZYA 659 (1975-2018)
- Former names: TV Imperatriz (1987-1991)
- Former channel numbers: Analog: 7 (VHF, 1975–2018)
- Former affiliations: Rede Tupi (1975-1980)

Technical information
- Licensing authority: ANATEL
- ERP: 2.5 kW
- Transmitter coordinates: 5°31′20.7″S 47°28′35.9″W

Links
- Public license information: Profile
- Website: redeglobo.globo.com/ma/tvmirante

TV Mirante Imperatriz (channel 10) is a Brazilian television station based in Imperatriz, a city in the state of Maranhão serving as an affiliate to TV Globo for Imperatriz and its surroundings. It is part of Rede Mirante, a television network belonging to Grupo Mirante.

== History ==
The initial operations of the current TV Mirante Imperatriz date back to December 25, 1975, when it was implemented on the initiative of the then mayor of Imperatriz, Alberto Barateiro da Costa, by means of a retransmitter through VHF channel 4, which carried, through tapes, programs from both Rede Globo and Rede Tupi. In 1978, with the creation of TV Tropical, which began occupying channel 4, the station migrated to VHF channel 10.

In 1980, with the bankruptcy of Rede Tupi, channel 10 began to exclusively show Globo programming, which continued to be received via tapes, coming from TV Difusora in São Luís, until the implementation of satellite transmissions in 1983. In 1986, Sistema Mirante de Comunicação, belonging to the family of the then president of the republic, José Sarney, took control of the station, and on July 24, 1986, following a presidential decree, channel 10 was elevated to the status of generator.

At the same time, the station started to air local programming for the first time, still on an experimental basis, with the airing of music videos in slots reserved for the insertion of local commercials during breaks; while behind the scenes, professionals were hired for the department of journalism and the preparation of the entire technical and production infrastructure. After a year of preparations, TV Imperatriz was opened on July 1, 1987, becoming the fifth station to generate local programming in the municipality. On February 1, 1991, it was renamed TV Mirante Imperatriz, unifying its programming with TV Mirante São Luís, which had left SBT after changing affiliations with TV Difusora.

On September 30, 2015, TV Mirante Imperatriz expanded its coverage area to part of the West, South and Central regions of the state, covering an additional 45 municipalities. A year later, the station started to have a branch in Açailândia, following the shutdown of TV Mirante Açailândia.

On January 24, 2017, employees of the station went on strike for an indefinite period, suspending the production of local programs, and TV Mirante Imperatriz began to relay all programming from São Luís. The reason would be the freezing of salaries in 2015, the adjustment below inflation in 2016 and the cut in food vouchers that year.

== Technical information ==
Virtual channel	Digital channel	Screen	Content
10.1	29 UHF	1080i	TV Mirante Imperatriz/Globo's main schedule

TV Mirante Imperatriz began its digital transmissions on December 29, 2013, on channel 29 UHF, being the first station in the city to inaugurate its digital signal, and the first outside the capital of Maranhão, São Luís.

Based on the federal decree transitioning Brazilian TV stations from analog to digital signals, TV Mirante Imperatriz, as well as the other stations in Imperatriz, ceased broadcasting on channel 10 VHF on December 17, 2018, following the official schedule from ANATEL. The station ended analog transmissions at 11:59 pm, during the airing of the film Star Wars: The Force Awakens on Tela Quente, which was replaced by the notice from MCTIC and ANATEL about the switch-off.
