= Boas Novas Belém =

Television station in Belém, Pará, Brazil

Boas Novas Belém (ZYP 145)
- Belém, Pará; Brazil
- Channels: Digital: 36 (UHF); Virtual: 4
- Branding: Boas Novas

Programming
- Affiliations: Boas Novas

Ownership
- Owner: Fundação Boas Novas; (Rádio Guajará Ltda.)

History
- Founded: December 15, 1964
- First air date: March 27, 1967
- Former call signs: ZYB 201 (1967-2018)
- Former names: TV Guajará (1967-1995); RBN Belém (1995-2007)
- Former channel numbers: Analog: 4 (VHF, 1967–2018)
- Former affiliations: REI (1967–1969); Rede Globo (1967–1976); Rede Bandeirantes (1976–1990); Record (1990–1995); CNT (1995–1999)

Technical information
- Licensing authority: ANATEL
- ERP: 10 kW
- Transmitter coordinates: 1°26′14.1″S 48°27′55.1″W

Links
- Public license information: Profile
- Website: boasnovas.net

Boas Novas Belém (channel 4) is a Brazilian television station based in Belém, capital of the state of Pará, carrying the Boas Novas network for the entire state. The station owned by the Fundação Boas Novas, and is controlled by the Assembly of God Church in Belém. It was opened in 1967 as TV Guajará, being the second television station in the state and the oldest in operation, and was acquired by the church in 1995.

== History ==
=== TV Guajará ===
The concession for the second television station in Belém was granted by President Humberto Castello Branco on December 15, 1964 to businessman and federal deputy Lopo de Castro, owner of Rádio Guajará, founded on December 28, 1960. They invested 2 million Cruzeiros in the implementation of the station, which, as per its founder's wishes, was the first to be set up entirely with nationally-made equipment, manufactured by Maxwell. Only the Ampex videotapes, acquired later, were foreign-made.

Due to its low budget, the broadcaster was installed on the 25th floor of the Manoel Pinto da Silva Building, in Praça da República, at the time the tallest building in Belém and the North of the country. The location was ideal for the transmission tower, placed on top of the building, but it also had problems assembling the studios, crossed by the building's columns, forcing camera operators not to let them leak into the air during local programs. The offices were separated by wooden partitions, from the same crates through which the transmission equipment had arrived.

TV Guajará was inaugurated on March 27, 1967, operating on VHF channel 4, six years after the pioneer TV Marajoara, Rede Tupi's owned-and-operated station. Its name derived from the radio station, which in turn referred to the bay that bathes the city of Belém, and its first logo, chosen by Lopo de Castro, was a saci, in reference to the legends of the Amazon. As the mandate of federal deputy required Lopo's constant presence in Brasília, the presidency of the station fell to his wife, Conceição Lobato de Castro, who had the distinction of being the first woman to run a television station in Brazil.

TV Guajará was one of the first affiliates of Rede Globo, which had signed a six-month experimental contract with the broadcaster, soon afterwards extended to a fixed contract with a longer duration, and also showed content produced by TV Record, which headed REI. The local programming schedule, which at the time aired between 5 pm and midnight, was basically made up of talk, music and news programs, such as Atualidades Guajará, shown at the end of the schedule before sign-off, and the local version of the children's Capitão Furacão, in addition to films and series.

In its first years on the air, there was intense rivalry with TV Marajoara, to the point that, at the time satellite transmissions began, it reserved all the times made available by Embratel for the retransmission of Rede Tupi, forcing TV Guajará to broadcast all recorded Globo programming. Together with the station's management, strategies were drawn up to attract viewers. The first was to change the route for sending the tapes, so that they no longer passed through affiliates in the Northeast region before arriving in Belém, which began to receive them directly from Rio de Janeiro, shortening the delay in showing the programs in relation to the competitor. The programming was also reinforced with a special film package, and Globo stars recorded exclusive calls for TV Guajará viewers. The measures had an effect and consolidated the station's leadership.

The station also carried the Círio de Nazaré jointly with TV Marajoara, with both channels forming a broadcast pool known as Rede Paraense de Televisão. Guajará benefited most from the transmission, since its headquarters, until then located on the 25th floor of the Manoel Pinto da Silva Building, was located between Avenidas Presidente Vargas and Nazaré, where the final stretch of the procession begins. The channel used the building's terrace and installed cameras for more vertical coverage of the pilgrimage.

In 1975, Rede Globo broke its affiliation contract with TV Guajará due to pressure exerted by President Ernesto Geisel, which benefited its newest competitor, TV Liberal, in the implementation phase. At the time, TV Liberal had as its director and partner the journalist Ossian Brito, who became a fundamental character not only in the bidding that gave rise to the broadcaster's concession but also in the relationships that motivated the change of affiliation, since he was the brother of technical engineer at Rede Globo, Colonel Wilson de Souza Brito, and brother-in-law of General Gustavo Moraes Rego Reis, President Geisel's trusted man, later becoming his military chief of staff. Another additional reason was that TV Guajará gave unconditional support to one of the president's political enemies, senator Jarbas Passarinho, who in turn was married to Ruth de Castro, cousin of Lopo de Castro.

TV Guajará ended its affiliation with Globo on April 30, 1976, the date on which its contract with the network came to an end, and adopted independent programming from the following day. The loss of Globo hurt the broadcaster, which saw its audience ratings suddenly drop to third place, as well as its revenue and advertisers, who fled to the competition, leading to layoffs, delays in the payroll of its employees and threats of strike.

TV Guajará's crisis situation lasted until November 1, when it signed a contract with Rede Bandeirantes, which began expanding its signal across the country. At the time, the network's programming was precariously limited to Jornal Bandeirantes and some video clips; Over time, other attractions would be added to the national schedule, such as soccer matches and special programs. At the end of the 1970s, TV Guajará was leased to the owner of TV Liberal, Romulo Maiorana (who maintained a similar schedule at TV Marajoara before opening his own station). At this time, under the administration of Alberto Bendahan and Irapuã Salles, programs were produced with names that became famous on local television, such as Thompson Mota, Eloy Santos, Joaquim Antunes and Pierre Beltrand.

In 1982, the original shareholders of TV Guajará, Lopo and Conceição de Castro, transferred their shares to their son, Lopo de Castro Júnior, who assumed the presidency of the station and the Guajará AM and FM radio stations (the latter opened in 1984). The new director promoted a restructuring of the broadcaster, purchasing from the bankrupt estate of Diários Associados the studios of TV Marajoara (closed in 1980 with the revocation of Rede Tupi), located at Avenida Governador José Malcher, 1 332, in the neighborhood of Nazaré, where the headquarters of TV Guajará and radio stations were transferred. The broadcaster also renewed its transmission equipment, acquiring a 16 kW RCA transmitter, the most powerful among broadcasters in Pará, and built a 105-meter tower in the new facilities, ensuring broad coverage in Belém and the metropolitan region. During the 1980s, local programs such as TV Cidade (presented by Kzan Lourenço and later by Everaldo Lobato) and Programa Carlos Santos na TV once again took TV Guajará to the leadership in audience.

At the end of the 1980s, Rede Bandeirantes entered into a partnership with the former governor of Amazonas, Gilberto Mestrinho, to retransmit its signal through TV Rio Negro, belonging to Francisco Garcia (who would be vice-president on Mestrinho's ticket for the 1990 state election). The agreement also extended to Pará, where Mestrinho's political ally, Jader Barbalho, was setting up his own broadcaster through VHF channel 10 (Barbalho later bought RBA TV, leaving the concession to his partner, Carlos Santos). Once again, TV Guajará was passed over in favor of political alignments, having to look for a new affiliation from 1990 onwards. The broadcaster signed a contract with Rede Record, which, after being sold to the bishop of the Universal Church of the Kingdom of God, Edir Macedo, also began to expand its signal across the country, in the same way as Rede Bandeirantes in 1976, and TV Guajará became its first affiliate.

TV Guajará left Rede Bandeirantes' programming on October 14, 1990, the same day that the Círio de Nazaré was held in Belém. For the next two weeks, the station aired its programming locally, with the exception of Jornal da Record, the only program retransmitted from the new network until the definitive premiere of the program, which took place on November 1. With the change of affiliation, Rede Bandeirantes began to be retransmitted partially by Rede Cultura do Pará (which shared its affiliation with TVE Brasil) until 1993, when RBA TV assumed its affiliation in place of Rede Manchete.

With the change of affiliation, TV Guajará's financial situation became more complicated once again, as Record was still seeking to establish itself in the market and its initial programming was not attractive to advertisers. Furthermore, the Castro family had taken out loans to finance the purchase of new equipment and, due to the monetary crisis faced by Brazil, which had changed currency twice since 1986, the debts increased exponentially with each devaluation. With the problem compounded by the loss of political influence of their owners and the lack of interest in the media industry, they found themselves having to sell all their assets.

=== Boas Novas Belém ===
In 1993, Lopo de Castro Júnior sold Guajará FM (now Liberdade FM) to the Church of the Foursquare Gospel of Pará, led by pastor Josué Bengtson, and Rádio Guajará (renamed Rádio Transpaz, now Rádio Boas Novas), to the Assembly of God Church of Belém, by pastor Firmino Gouveia. Both IEQ and the Assembly of God rented time slots on TV Guajará since the 1980s, presenting respectively the programs Prece Poderosa and Boas Novas no Lar on the network's mornings.

On January 27, 1995, it was TV Guajará's turn to be put up for sale. To protect its coverage in the state, Rede Record offered 2.8 million dollars for the broadcaster. However, due to the successful sale of Radio Transpaz, Lopo gave preference to the proposal from the Assembly of God, which offered 3 million dollars. As with the purchase of the radio, the church's pastorate mobilized all its faithful in Pará in search of donations and also had the support of the Evangelical Church Assembly of God in Amazonas (IEADAM), responsible for the Boas Novas Network, with which more later signed a partnership contract to manage the assets.

On March 10, pastor Firmino Gouveia and Lopo de Castro Júnior met to close the agreement to purchase TV Guajará, and it was agreed that the Assembly of God should pay 24 installments of 125,000 dollars per month to complete the transaction. The terms of the contract were signed between the parties, and five days later the Assembly of God took possession of the station.

On March 15, the same day that Rede Boas Novas completed two years on the air, TV Guajará became the network's owned-and-operated station, changing its name to RBN Belém. The new management of the station replaced all programs produced until then for productions aimed at the evangelical public, sometimes broadcast in a chain with RBN Manaus, and donated the collection of images and various historical equipment from the then TV Guajará to the Museu da Imagem e do Som do Pará. Record's secular programming continued to be shown by RBN, however due to the association between the network and the Universal Church of the Kingdom of God, which competed for the same target audience as the Assembly of God, the station did not renew its affiliation contract, which was scheduled to expire that year, and began relaying CNT programming on November 19. In turn, Record remained without a signal in Belém until 1997, when it finalized negotiations to purchase the concession for VHF channel 10, which gave rise to TV Record Pará.

In 1997, Samuel Câmara took over the pastorate of the Assembly of God Church in Belém in place of Firmino Gouveia and continued the commitments made by the church with the creation of the Visão 2000 project, which sought monthly contributions from volunteers (called "maintainers"). to cover the expenses of the Boas Novas Network. The project later became the Good News Mission and its volunteers became known as "seeders". With the help of his followers, the church continued to pay the monthly fee of 40 thousand reais to maintain its satellite signal, the last installments of the purchase of the broadcaster (paid in March 1998), and modernized all its equipment, which had already were completely obsolete. In October of the same year, RBN Belém left its old studios on Avenida Governador José Malcher and moved to the headquarters of the Theological Seminary of the Assembly of God, in the Marco neighborhood, where it started to operate together with Rádio Transpaz.

On September 5, 1999, together with the Manaus station, RBN Belém stopped being affiliated with the CNT to show independent and entirely evangelical programming. In 2007, with the reformulation of the network's brand, the station was renamed Boas Novas Belém.

== Controversies ==
=== Umbanda before Holy Mass ===
In January 1975, the then-TV Guajará pioneered local television by producing and broadcasting Holy Mass live on Sunday mornings. The idea came from the then-Archbishop of Belém, Dom Alberto Gaudêncio Ramos, who argued that the capital of Pará was one of the few cities in the country where Mass was not televised, and he insisted on celebrating it personally. Two months later, on March 2nd, its competitor TV Marajoara also decided to produce its own Holy Mass, celebrated by Father Joaquim Farinha, whose debut was also attended by the coadjutor archbishop of Manaus, Bishop Milton Correia Pereira, and Bishop Alberto, as concelebrants. Upon seeing the previews for the Holy Mass on TV Guajará’s rival station the day before it was scheduled to air, the station’s then-director, Alamar Régis Carvalho, was surprised to learn that Bishop Alberto would be participating in the celebration and viewed this as an act of betrayal.

In retaliation, Alamar decided to film an Umbanda ritual at the TV Guajará studios, which was to be aired the following morning before Holy Mass. He then called the station’s owner, Lopo de Castro, claiming he wanted to record a special with Father Joãozinho da Gomeia, who was visiting Belém (even though Joãozinho had actually died four years earlier), and ordered his assistant, José Paulo Costa, to round up followers to participate in the program. To set up the show’s backdrop, Alamar bought candles at a market on the ground floor of the building where the station’s headquarters were located and had the owner of the O Mandarim store open his shop late at night to buy ribbons and other items that could evoke a terreiro.

The special was recorded and edited for broadcast throughout the night, and by Sunday morning the studio had been cleaned so that Father Bruno Sechi, who was to celebrate Mass in place of Dom Alberto, could prepare the altar with his assistants, unaware of what had happened hours earlier in the same location. During the broadcast of the Sessão de Umbanda (as announced in the off-air promos aired the previous night during the breaks in the “8 p.m. telenovela”) the station’s staff locked the priest inside the studio so he wouldn’t go to the master control room and realize what was being shown before he began the celebration.

The incident caused significant tension between the Archdiocese of Belém do Pará and TV Guajará. In a lengthy article published in the following day’s edition of the newspaper A Província do Pará, Bishop Alberto excommunicated those involved in the incident, particularly director Alamar Régis Carvalho, and days later issued an archdiocesan decree regarding guidelines for the celebration of Masses on television, expressly prohibiting their broadcast from locations where macumba rituals are performed. After many discussions between the archdiocese and the station, the situation was resolved, and TV Guajará resumed producing the Holy Mass on Sundays, keeping it in its programming until the mid-1980s.

=== “Inri Cristo's ‘libertarian act’” ===
TV Guajará once again found itself at the center of a religious controversy, this time indirectly, in 1982, when it welcomed astrologer Álvaro Thais—popularly known as Inri Cristo—as a guest on Eloy Santos’s show between February 24 and 26. Inri had arrived in Belém in May 1981 with the goal, according to him, of founding the SOUST (Supreme Universal Order of the Holy Trinity), and became famous for his sermons against the Catholic Church, claiming that he himself was “Jesus Christ in the flesh” and not an image on the altar.

During one of the programs, which drew a huge audience to TV Guajará and crowds of people to the entrance of the Manoel Pinto da Silva Building, Inri allegedly “cured” a supposed paralytic in front of a panel of doctors and psychologists, and in his final appearance, which lasted about three hours, he called on viewers to participate in the “liberation act against the Catholic Church” at the Metropolitan Cathedral of Belém on February 28. In that episode, which drew more than 10,000 people, Inri stormed into the cathedral, which was at the time holding a special Mass for children, assaulted the deacon presiding over the service, and broke a crucifix bearing the image of Jesus Christ on the church altar. The worshippers attending the Mass protested against Inri and one of them threw a chair at him; he picked it up and placed it on the table where he was standing, addressing the crowd. A unit of the Pará State Military Police was called in to put an end to the disturbance, and Inri was taken to the São José Liberto Prison, where he was held for 15 days.
