= TV Mirante Cocais =

TV Mirante Cocais (ZYA 653)
- Codó, Maranhão; Brazil
- Channels: Digital: 29 (UHF); Virtual: 9
- Branding: TV Mirante

Programming
- Affiliations: TV Globo

Ownership
- Owner: Grupo Mirante; (TV Itapecuru Ltda.)

History
- First air date: 1988
- Former names: TV Itapecuru (1988-2001)
- Former channel numbers: Analog: 9 (VHF, 1988–2018)

Technical information
- Licensing authority: ANATEL
- ERP: 2.5 kW
- Transmitter coordinates: 4°26′44.3″S 43°53′19.3″W

Links
- Public license information: Profile
- Website: redeglobo.globo.com/ma/tvmirante

TV Mirante Cocais (channel 9) is a Brazilian television station licensed to Codó, but headquartered in Cocais. It is one of the four Rede Mirante stations, covering eastern Maranhão.

== History ==
The station was founded in 1988 as TV Itapecuru by businessman Nagib Haickel. Since its founding, it has been a TV Globo affiliate. In April 2001, a relay station in Timon was set up, on UHF channel 14, enabling the reception of two Globo affiliates to the cities of Teresina and Timon, one entirely from Maranhão and the other from Piauí (TV Clube). This countered ANATEL rules regarding two stations from the same licensee in the same region.

Shortly after these events, the station was acquired by the Sarney family, and on June 14, was renamed TV Mirante Cocais, also relaying programs from São Luís. On the same day, it was relayed for the first time in Cocais on VHF channel 8, replacing the former TV Cocais (founded in 1992 by Paulo Guimarães —also founder of TV Timon — as TV Paraíso and as an affiliate of Rede OM/CNT, changing its name and affiliation to Globo in 1995).

In October 2007, its transmitters were switched off for maintenance in order to change its equipment, in order to improve the quality of its signal and increasing the coverage to nearby areas. In late 2011, the station replaced its microwave relay station with satellite relays, using Star One C2 for this purpose.

In January 2013, the station moved its headquarters to Caxias, at a house in Morro do Alecrim. On July 10, 2013, it resumed local program production, with the premiere of JMTV 2ª edição, presented by David Peres, and the Mirante Notícia news bulletins, aired during program breaks.

On November 11, 2017, the station stopped producing local programming, instead relaying the programs generated from São Luís, excluding local commercials. TV Mirante Cocais also took over the transmitter network used by TV Mirante Santa Inês, which was closed in the same process.

== Technical information ==
Virtual channel	Digital channel	Screen	Content
9.1	29 UHF	1080i	TV Mirante Cocais/Globo programming

Digital tests started on September 3, 2015, for the city of Caxias, on physical channel 28, becoming definitive on November 24. Its generator in Codó, however, only started digital broadcasts in July 2016, on physical channel 29.
