= Imperial TV =

Imperatriz, Maranhão; Brazil
- Channels: Digital: 18 (UHF); Virtual: 4

Programming
- Affiliations: RedeTV!

Ownership
- Owner: Francisco Pereira Lima; (TV Chico do Rádio Comunicação Ltda.)

History
- First air date: December 25, 1975
- Former names: TV Imperatriz (1975-1978; 2019-2021); TV Tropical (1978-1992); TV CRC (1992-2008; 2015-2019); Band Imperatriz (2008-2015; 2019); GTVI (2021); Record News Imperatriz (2021); Imperatriz TV (2021-2023); TV Liberdade (2023-2024)
- Former channel numbers: Analog: 4 (VHF, 1975–2018)

Technical information
- Licensing authority: ANATEL
- ERP: 1 kW
- Transmitter coordinates: 5°30′57.9″S 47°28′59.7″W

Links
- Public license information: Profile

Imperial TV (channel 4) is a RedeTV!-affiliated station licensed to Imperatriz, a city in the state of Maranhão. Founded in 1975 under the name TV Imperatriz, since 1992, the station is owned by politician and businessman Francisco Pereira Lima, alias "Chico do Rádio".

== History ==
The station was founded on Christmas Day 1975 by Alberto Barateiro da Costa, then-mayor of the municipality, relaying programs from Rede Tupi. In 1978, a company formed by Raimundo Cabeludo, Francisco Ramos and Bayma Junior took control of the station, changing its name to TV Tropical and joining Rede Bandeirantes.

In 1992, Francisco Ramos, Bayma Junior and Raimundo Cabeludo sold their shares to rising politician and businessman Francisco Pereira Lima, better known under his nickname Chico do Rádio. after the acquisition, Chico changed the name of the station to TV CRC, the initials of the new legal name of the company: TV Chico do Rádio Comunicação Ltda.

In 2008, TV CRC was renamed Band Imperatriz, without changes to its local programming. That same year, it started airing TV Kamaleão, a program produced in São Luís, the state capital. In 2015, the station's name was reverted to TV CRC, adopting the slogan De Cara Nova. On January 7, 2019, TV CRC was rented for a five-year period to a group of businessmen led by Marcos Daniel, who became its new director-general, reverting its name to Band Imperatriz, for a short period. On February 16, it was simply renamed TV Imperatriz (TVI). The company's legal name changed on April 5.

On October 14, after a decision taken by Rede Bandeirantes not to continue with the station, in order to prioritize the unification of its signal with Band O&O Band Maranhão, TVI left the network after 41 years of affiliation — the title of Band's oldest affiliate was later taken by TV Tarobá Cascavel in the state of Paraná —, and joined Record News, which had no signal in Imperatriz since the shutdown of Record News Imperatriz, due to the end of analog TV in the city. A troca ocorreu às 19h30, com uma cerimônia especial transmitida pela TVI.

In 2020, Marcos Daniel left the group responsible for TVI's management, which was now presided by businessman Pedro Carlos Duarte. On April 18, 2021, the station changed its name again, this time to GTVI. At the same time, its local programming began to be mirrored on UHF channel 19, with Rede Meio Norte's programming. On May 10, 2021, the station ends its usage of the GTVI nomenclature and was renamed Record News Imperatriz.

In October 2021, the nomenclature is changed to Imperatriz TV. On December 3, it was announced that the station would change its affiliation to RedeTV!, effective December 13. RedeTV! was formerly on TV Liberdade.

In May 2023, the station changes its name to TV Liberdade.

On December 13, 2024, it adopted its current name, Imperial TV.

== Technical information ==
Virtual channel	Digital channel	Screen	Content
4.1	18 UHF	1080i	Imperial TV/RedeTV!'s main schedule

The station shut down its analog signal on VHF channel 10 on December 17, 2018, following the official ANATEL roadmap.
