= TV Anhanguera Catalão =

TV Anhanguera Catalão (ZYP 317)
Catalão, Goiás; Brazil
- Channels: Digital: 33 (UHF); Virtual: 7
- Branding: TV Anhanguera

Programming
- Affiliations: TV Globo

Ownership
- Owner: Grupo Jaime Cãmara; (Televisão Pirapitinga S.A.)

History
- First air date: November 11, 1995
- Former call signs: ZYA 577 (1995-2021)
- Former names: TV Pirapitinga (1995-2012)
- Former channel numbers: Analog: 7 (VHF, 1995–2021)

Technical information
- Licensing authority: ANATEL
- ERP: 0.35 kW
- Transmitter coordinates: 18°9′15.6″S 47°56′57.9″W

Links
- Public license information: Profile
- Website: redeglobo.globo.com/tvanhanguera

TV Anhanguera Catalão is a Brazilian television station based in Catalão, a city in the state of Goiás. It operates on channel 7 (34 UHF digital), and is affiliated with TV Globo. It is one of Rede Anhanguera's stations, owned by the Jaime Câmara Group, broadcasting its programming to the southeast of Goiás.

== History ==
The station was opened on November 11, 1995 as TV Pirapitinga, being the third television station of the Jaime Câmara Group in the interior of Goiás.

On October 24, 2012, like the other stations of Rede Anhanguera, the station began to adopt the name TV Anhanguera Catalão.

On July 16, 2018, Jornal Anhanguera 1st Edition began to be produced completely locally, directly from Catalão.

On May 4, 2020, Rede Anhanguera announced that it would end local television news production on TV Anhanguera Catalão. The reason was the dismissal of a large number of employees, due to spending cuts.

== Technical information ==
| Virtual channel | Digital channel | Screen resolution | Programming |
|---|---|---|---|
| 7.1 | 33 UHF | 1080i | TV Anhanguera Catalão/Globo's main programming |

TV Anhanguera Catalão launched its digital signal on July 1, 2013, alongside the stations in Itumbiara and Jataí. On July 16, 2018, it started airing its local newscasts in high definition. Analog broadcasts ended on July 31, 2021.
