= TV Morena Corumbá =

TV Morena Corumbá (ZYA 940)
- Corumbá, Mato Grosso do Sul; Brazil
- Channels: Digital: 31 (UHF); Virtual: 5

Programming
- Affiliations: TV Globo

Ownership
- Owner: Rede Matogrossense de Comunicação (Grupo Zahran); (Televisão Cidade Branca Ltda.)

History
- Founded: September 21, 1970
- First air date: October 4, 1970
- Former names: TV Cidade Branca (1970-2008)
- Former channel numbers: Analog: 5 (VHF, 1970–2022)
- Former affiliations: Rede Tupi (1970–1976); REI (1970–1976)

Technical information
- Licensing authority: ANATEL
- ERP: 1 kW
- Transmitter coordinates: 19°1′7.8″S 57°38′29.4″W

Links
- Public license information: Profile
- Website: redeglobo.globo.com/tvmorena

TV Morena Corumbá is a Brazilian television station based in Corumbá, a city in the state of Mato Grosso do Sul. It operates on channel 5 (digital UHF 31) and is a TV Globo affiliate. Owned by Rede Matogrossense de Comunicação, it is one of the three stations of TV Morena, which has its headquarters located in Campo Grande. Its studios are located in the Universitário neighborhood, and its transmitters are at the top of Morro São Felipe, in the Popular Velha neighborhood.

== History ==
In 1963, the brothers Eduardo, Nagib and Ueze Zahran, owners of the gas trading company Copagaz, requested concessions from the National Telecommunications Council for television operations in the cities of Cuiabá, Campo Grande and Corumbá, in the state of Mato Grosso. The federal government decreed the granting of VHF channel 5 in Corumbá to the Zahran family on January 11, 1967. For the station to go on air, it was necessary to fulfill a quota that determined the sale of television sets to the local population.

TV Cidade Branca was founded on September 21, 1970, and officially began broadcasting on October 4 of the same year, being the third station of Rede Matogrossense de Televisão, until then formed by TV Morena in Campo Grande and TV Centro América in Cuiabá. During this period, the stations received content from Rede de Emissoras Independentes and Rede Tupi.

In 1976, the entire Rede Matogrossense network of stations joined Rede Globo. The following year, with the dismemberment of the current state of Mato Grosso do Sul, where TV Morena and TV Cidade Branca began to generate their programming, while TV Centro América was responsible for Mato Grosso, RMT began to have bi-state character as a television network. In 1979, investments were made so that the broadcaster could start carrying out direct transmissions.

In 2008, TV Cidade Branca changed its name to TV Morena Corumbá. On August 13, 2019, the station had a new headquarters inaugurated, in a building in the Universitário neighborhood, leaving the space it occupied until then in Popular Velha.

== Technical information ==
Virtual channel	Digital channel	Screen	Content
5.1	31 UHF	1080i	TV Morena Corumbá/Globo's main schedule

The station began its digital transmissions on June 5, 2014, a week before the 2014 FIFA World Cup, through UHF channel 31 to Corumbá and nearby areas.

Based on the federal decree transitioning Brazilian TV stations from analog to digital signals, TV Morena Corumbá, as well as the other stations in Campo Grande, ceased broadcasting on VHF channel 5 on July 31, 2022, following the official ANATEL roadmap.

== Programming ==
In addition to relaying TV Globo's national programming, TV Morena Corumbá generates the local segment of MSTV's 1st edition, presented by Évelin Batista. The rest of the programming is made up of programs generated by TV Morena in Campo Grande.
