= TV Vanguarda São José dos Campos =

- São José dos Campos, São Paulo; Brazil
- Channels: Digital: 16 (UHF); Virtual: 17
- Branding: Vanguarda

Programming
- Affiliations: TV Globo

Ownership
- Owner: Rede Vanguarda; (TV Vale do Paraíba Ltda.)

History
- Founded: February 12, 1987
- First air date: October 1, 1988
- Former names: Rede Globo Vale do Paraiba (1988-1998); TV Vanguarda Paulista (1998-2001); TV Vanguarda (2002-2003)
- Former channel numbers: Analog: 17 (UHF, 1988–2018)

Technical information
- Licensing authority: ANATEL
- ERP: 2.3 kW
- Transmitter coordinates: 23°9′14.8″S 45°54′22.9″W

Links
- Public license information: Profile
- Website: redeglobo.globo.com/sp/tvvanguarda

Vanguarda (channel 17) is a Brazilian television station based in São José dos Campos, a city in the state of São Paulo serving as the affiliate of the TV Globo network for said city and its surroundings. Owned-and-operated by locally based Rede Vanguarda, it transmits its programming to part of Paraíba Valley, while the other half and the North Coast are covered by TV Vanguarda Taubaté. Its headquarters are located in an annex to CenterVale Shopping in Jardim Oswaldo Cruz, while its transmission antenna is at the top of Morro do Cruzeiro, in Jardim Guimarães.

== History ==
Organizações Globo received the concession of a television station in Vale do Paraíba on February 12, 1987, when President José Sarney granted channel 17 UHF in São José dos Campos to the group. About a year later, on October 1, 1988, TV Globo Vale do Paraíba was opened, Rede Globo's ninth own broadcaster and the fourth to be opened in the state of São Paulo. Its studios were built in an annex to CenterVale Shopping, which had been opened in 1987 by São Marcos Empreendimentos Imobiliários Ltda., a company controlled by the Marinho family (sold in 2008 to the Ancar Ivanhoe chain) and its implementation was delivered in a record time of just 100 days.

Initially, its coverage area covered around 40 municipalities in Vale do Paraíba, the North Coast and Serra da Mantiqueira. In 1998, it also began serving the Bragantina Region, previously covered by TV Globo São Paulo retransmitters. That same year, Central Globo de Affiliadas e Expansão launched the "Projeto Regional do Futuro", which aimed to give greater autonomy to Rede Globo's own broadcasters in inland São Paulo and also to TV Globo Juiz de Fora in Minas Gerais, as well such as expanding programming and interacting with the local community. From then on, TV Globo Vale do Paraíba was renamed TV Vanguarda Paulista, a name that was reduced to just TV Vanguarda at the end of 2001.

In March 2002, due to financial problems related to unsuccessful investments in Globo Cabo, Globo put up for sale its shareholding in 27 stations across the country, including TV Vanguarda, in order to raise capital to cover the hole in its finances. In September of the same year, the station was acquired by businessman José Bonifácio de Oliveira Sobrinho, known as Boni, former general director of Rede Globo, who had also recently won the bid for a new television channel in the municipality of Taubaté, which became TV Vanguarda Taubaté.

With the union of the two broadcasters, Rede Vanguarda was created on August 21, 2003, and the São José dos Campos channel assumed the role of head of the network. Its coverage area was then divided with the Taubaté channel, and after that, it started to serve only 18 municipalities. (Atibaia, Bom Jesus dos Perdões, Bragança Paulista, Caçapava, Campos do Jordão, Igaratá, Jacareí, Jambeiro, Joanópolis, Monteiro Lobato, Nazaré Paulista, Paraibuna, Piracaia, Santa Branca, Santo Antônio do Pinhal, São Bento do Sapucaí, São José dos Campos and Vargem).

On August 27, 2011, when Rede Vanguarda completed 8 years, the cornerstone of a new headquarters was laid, in an event attended by Boni, the then governor of São Paulo, Geraldo Alckmin, and the mayor of São Paulo. José dos Campos, Eduardo Cury. The new development will occupy an area of 8,500 m^{2} in the Jardim das Colinas neighborhood, and will have a 6-story building for offices, as well as separate blocks for technical and journalism centers. The new headquarters were expected to be completed by 2014, but work hadn't even started yet.

== Technical information ==
Virtual	Digital	Screen	Content
17.1	16 UHF	1080i	Rede Vanguarda

The station began its digital transmissions in May 2010, on an experimental basis, through channel 16 UHF. On June 1, together with its sister TV Vanguarda Taubaté, it officially inaugurated its digital broadcasts. In 2014, it began broadcasting its programs in high definition.

Based on the federal decree for the transition of Brazilian TV stations from analogue to digital signals, TV Vanguarda São José dos Campos, as well as the other stations in São José dos Campos, ceased broadcasting on channel 17 UHF on January 17, 2018, following the official ANATEL schedule.
