= TV Anhanguera Palmas =

TV Anhanguera Palmas (ZYP 328)
- Palmas; Brazil
- Channels: Digital: 23 (UHF); Virtual: 11
- Branding: TV Anhanguera

Programming
- Affiliations: TV Globo

Ownership
- Owner: Grupo Jaime Cãmara; (Televisão Anhanguera S.A.)
- Sister stations: CBN Tocantins

History
- First air date: September 5, 2005
- Former call signs: ZYA 582 (2005-2018)
- Former channel number: Analog: 24 (UHF, 2005–2009); 11 (VHF, 2009–2017)

Technical information
- Licensing authority: ANATEL
- ERP: 0.40 kW

Links
- Public license information: Profile
- Website: redeglobo.globo.com/tvanhanguera

TV Anhanguera Palmas is a Brazilian television station based in Palmas, capital of the state of Tocantins. It operates on virtual channel 11 (physical channel 23 UHF), and is affiliated with TV Globo. It has been the generator of Rede Anhanguera for the state of Tocantins since its inauguration on September 5, 2005, generating its programming for 22 municipalities and also for the network's other two stations in the state in Araguaína and Gurupi.

== History ==
With the division of the state of Goiás on January 1, 1989, with the state of Tocantins being created in what was the former north of the state, the Rede Anhanguera stations existing in that region, TV Anhanguera Gurupi and TV Anhanguera Araguaína, began to generate its programming for the new region, and the Gurupi broadcaster, as it is geographically close to the provisional capital, Miracema do Tocantins, became the network head for the new state.

During the construction of the capital Palmas, TV Anhanguera Gurupi installed a repeater in the location in 1989, on channel 11 VHF. In 1995, with the capital already ready, the Jaime Câmara Organization installed a branch of the broadcaster in a commercial gallery, where a commercial department and a journalism department operated precariously.

In October 2000, the concession for channel 11 VHF was transferred to the politician Siqueira Campos, who founded TV Jovem in the same year. As a result, the TV rebroadcaster Anhanguera Gurupi began broadcasting on channel 24 UHF.

Only on September 5, 2005, the Jaime Câmara Organization opened its new and spacious headquarters on block 102 Norte, thus creating TV Anhanguera Palmas, in addition to transferring the OJC offices from the old branch to the new building, as well as the responsibility for generating state programming, which passed from the then TV Anhanguera Gurupi to the new broadcaster.

As channel 24 was a retransmitter linked to the Gurupi broadcaster, OJC purchased from Siqueira Campos, in April 2007, the concession of VHF channel 11, the channel of the old Anhanguera Gurupi TV retransmitter, and from March 16, 2009, it migrated from channel 24 UHF to 11 VHF. Channel 24 UHF broadcasts for another week until it goes off the air on March 22.

On October 24, 2012, Rede Anhanguera launched its new logo during the Jornal Anhanguera 1st edition, which has features similar to those of Rede Globo. On that occasion, the network's broadcasters in the interior of the state of Goiás followed the example of the broadcasters in Tocantins and the broadcaster in the capital Goiânia, adopting the name TV Anhanguera.

On June 28, 2013, the station launched local versions of G1 and globoesporte.com, where news articles and videos from TV Anhanguera programs began to be published.

On January 3, 2019, it was announced by Leandro Santiago himself (on his social networks) that the local Globo Esporte block was extinguished, which led this dismissal, who was editor-in-chief of the program.

On January 6, 2019, Jornal do Campo began to be recorded and generated by TV Anhanguera de Goiânia, after the extinction of the program that was recorded in the studios of TV Anhanguera de Palmas. Goiás and Tocantins started to unify the program for both states.

== Technical information ==
Virtual channel	Digital channel	Screen resolution	Programming
11.1	23 UHF	1080i	TV Anhanguera/Globo's main programming

The station launched its digital signal on channel 23 UHF on August 1, 2010, becoming the first broadcaster in the city to broadcast using the new technology, and on the same day that the digital signals of TV Rio Vermelho and TV Tocantins were also launched. On February 9, 2015, the station's news and programs began to be shown in high definition.

Based on the federal decree transitioning Brazilian TV stations from analogue to digital signals, TV Anhanguera Palmas, as well as the other stations in Palmas, ceased broadcasting on channel 11 VHF on August 14, 2018, following the official schedule from ANATEL. The signal was cut off at 11:59 pm, during Jornal da Globo, and was replaced by a warning from MCTIC and ANATEL about the switch-off.
