= Brazilian ship Liberal =

Liberal is the name of the following ships of the Brazilian Navy:

- Brazilian corvette Liberal
- Brazilian frigate Liberal, a Niterói-class frigate launched in 1977

== See also ==
- Liberal (disambiguation)
