= TV Tarobá Cascavel =

TV Tarobá Cascavel (ZYB 397)
- Curitiba, Paraná; Brazil
- Channels: Digital: 36 (UHF); Virtual: 6
- Branding: TV Tarobá

Programming
- Affiliations: Rede Bandeirantes

Ownership
- Owner: Grupo Tarobá; (Rádio e Televisão Tarobá Ltda.)
- Sister stations: Tarobá FM Cascavel

History
- First air date: February 1, 1979
- Former channel numbers: Analog: 6 (VHF, 1979-2018)

Technical information
- Licensing authority: ANATEL
- ERP: 4 kW
- Transmitter coordinates: 24°57′17.7″S 53°27′18.8″W

Links
- Public license information: Profile
- Website: tv.tarobanews.com

TV Tarobá Cascavel (channel 6) is a Band-affiliated station licensed to Cascavel, Paraná. It is one of the two television stations owned by Grupo Tarobá (the other being in Londrina) and covers the west of the state.

== History ==
After public bidding, the license for VHF channel 6 in Cascavel was granted by president Ernesto Geisel on June 29, 1976, to a group of businessmen led by journalist João Milanez, owner of the Folha de Londrina newspaper. From then, the implementation process of what became the first television station in western Paraná began, with the buying of cutting-edge equipment imported from West Germany, and the hiring of local media progessionals and even from other states of the country.

TV Tarobá opened on February 1, 1979, relaying the programming of Rede Bandeirantes, which is currently its oldest affiliate. Its name is derived from one of the indigenous legends about the creation of Iguaçu Falls. Since that period, the station invested massively in its local programming and also in its coverage, reaching by 1999 a potential audience of over 4 million viewers. In 1981, an office in Foz do Iguaçu opened, with its own productions and the ability of producing large-scale live events. Paraguayans and Argentines who lived in the border area also started following TV Tarobá's local schedule.

In the following year, João Milanez associated with businessmen Tito Muffato, Pedro Muffato and Hermínio Vieira, owners of Grupo Muffato. Milanez kept in front of the company until 2005, when he sold his share to the Muffato family. Since then, the company is divided between Tito Muffato's heirs (who died in an air accident in 1996), brothers Ederson, Everton and José Eduardo Muffato, and widow Reni Muffato.

== Technical information ==
Virtual channel	Digital channel	Screen	Content
6.1	36 UHF	1080i	TV Tarobá Cascavel/Band's main schedule

The station started its digital broadcasts on February 24, 2011, through physical UHF channel 36, with a ceremony where authorities such as state governor Beto Richa and the minister of communications Paulo Bernardo were invited. Since then, its programming is generated in high definition.

The station shut down its analog transmitter on November 28, 2018, according to ANATEL's official roadmap.
