= TV Anhanguera Anápolis =

TV Anhanguera Anápolis (ZYA 573)
Goiânia, Goiás; Brazil
- Channels: Digital: 33 (UHF); Virtual: 7
- Branding: TV Anhanguera

Programming
- Affiliations: TV Globo

Ownership
- Owner: Grupo Jaime Cãmara; (Televisão Anhanguera S.A.)

History
- First air date: September 20, 1980
- Former names: TV Tocantins (1980-2012)
- Former channel numbers: Analog: 7 (VHF, 1980–2017)

Technical information
- Licensing authority: ANATEL
- ERP: 5kW

Links
- Website: redeglobo.globo.com/tvanhanguera

TV Anhanguera Anápolis is a Brazilian television station based in Anápolis, GO. It belongs to Rede Anhanguera, affiliated with TV Globo. It operates on virtual channel 7 (physical channel 33) as one of the regional transmission stations of Rede Anhanguera in Goiás, which has its main facilities located in Goiânia.

== History ==
In the late 1970s, Anápolis had no local television signals. Around this time, TV Anhanguera started providing a link to the city, setting up relay stations (the only other station available in Anápolis at the time was TV Brasília) and the ability of producing local reports. It launched on September 20, 1980, initially named TV Tocantins, being the third television station of the Jaime Câmara Organization in the State of Goiás. Today it is the oldest inland station in the state, as the first two stations outside of Goiânia, in the cities Araguaína and Gurupi became part of the state of Tocantins in 1988.

Its original coverage area covered the central region, the north and part of the northwest of Goiás, covering more than 70 municipalities. In 2004, with the inauguration of the then TV Rio do Ouro (today TV Anhanguera Porangatu), the Anápolis broadcaster began transmitting its signals only to the central region, totaling 37 municipalities served, a total of almost half a million viewers.

The concession for channel 7 VHF generator was granted at the end of the 70s by former president Ernesto Geisel to the then bionic senator Benedito Vicente Ferreira (Benedito Boa Sorte), who passed it on to businessman and politician Jaime Câmara. The broadcaster has already won advertising awards offered by TV Globo, due to the good services provided.

The digital signal, through channel 33 UHF, was inaugurated on August 2, 2010 in a ceremony at the OJC headquarters in Palmas. At the same event, the group inaugurated the digital signals of Anhanguera TVs in the capital of Tocantins and Luziânia. However, TV Anhanguera Anápolis only started broadcasting in digital signal in its local programming from 2012 onwards. With the implementation of TV Anhanguera's new logo on October 24, 2012, all stations unified their names.

On March 9, 2015, TV Anhanguera Anápolis began showing Jornal Anhanguera 1st edition in its entirety, totaling approximately 45 minutes of daily journalistic programming at 12pm. In addition, the station showed a local block of Jornal Anhanguera 2nd edition, at 7:10 pm.

On June 15, 2020, TV Anhanguera Anápolis began producing and generating in an integrated manner the Jornal Anhanguera 1st edition from 11:45 am to 1:00 pm and the Jornal Anhanguera 2nd edition from 7:10 pm to 7:40 pm for the entire interior of the state of Goiás (for broadcasters from Catalão, Porangatu, Luziânia, Rio Verde, Jataí and Itumbiara) in a single edition. The broadcaster also generates Anhanguera Notícias for the interior of the state during programming breaks and relays programs generated from the main station in Goiânia.

== Technical information ==
Virtual channel	Digital channel	Screen resolution	Programming
7.1	33 UHF	1080i	TV Anhanguera Anápolis/Globo's main programming

Based on the federal decree transitioning Brazilian TV stations from analogue to digital signals, TV Anhanguera Anápolis, as well as the other stations in the city, ceased broadcasting on VHF channel 7 on June 21, 2017, following the official ANATEL roadmap.
