= RPC Paranavaí =

RPC Paranavaí (ZYB 411)
Paranavaí, Paraná; Brazil
- Channels: Digital: 42 (UHF); Virtual: 29
- Branding: RPC

Programming
- Affiliations: TV Globo

Ownership
- Owner: Grupo Paranaense de Comunicação; (Rádio e Televisão Imagem Ltda.)

History
- First air date: September 25, 1992
- Former names: TV Imagem do Noroeste (1992-2000); RPC TV Imagem do Noroeste (2000-2010); RPC TV Paranavaí (2010-2014)
- Former channel numbers: Analog: 29 (UHF, 1992-2018)

Technical information
- Licensing authority: ANATEL

Links
- Website: redeglobo.globo.com/RPC

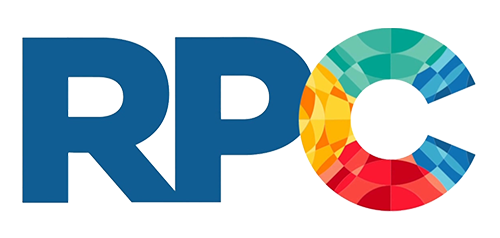
The logo of RPC

RPC Paranavaí is a Brazilian television station based in Paranavaí, PR. It operates on channel 29 (42 UHF digital) and is affiliated to TV Globo. It belongs to the Paranaense Communication Group (GRPCom), in addition to generating local programming.

== History ==
Founded in 1988 and starting operations in 1992 by the J. Malucelli group as TV Imagem, it was acquired by RPTV in August 1997, when it became a Globo affiliate. The station opened an office in Umuarama in 1999.

== Technical information ==
=== Subchannels ===
Channel	Video	Aspect	Short name	Programming
29.1	1080i	16:9	RPC TV	Main RPC programming / TV Globo

After two months working in experimental format RPC Paranavaí's digital signal was officially inaugurated on December 18, 2012.

In June 2014, its news operation converted to high definition, becoming the last of the eight stations of the RPC network to do so.
