= TV Difusora São Luís =

TV Difusora São Luís (ZYP 325)
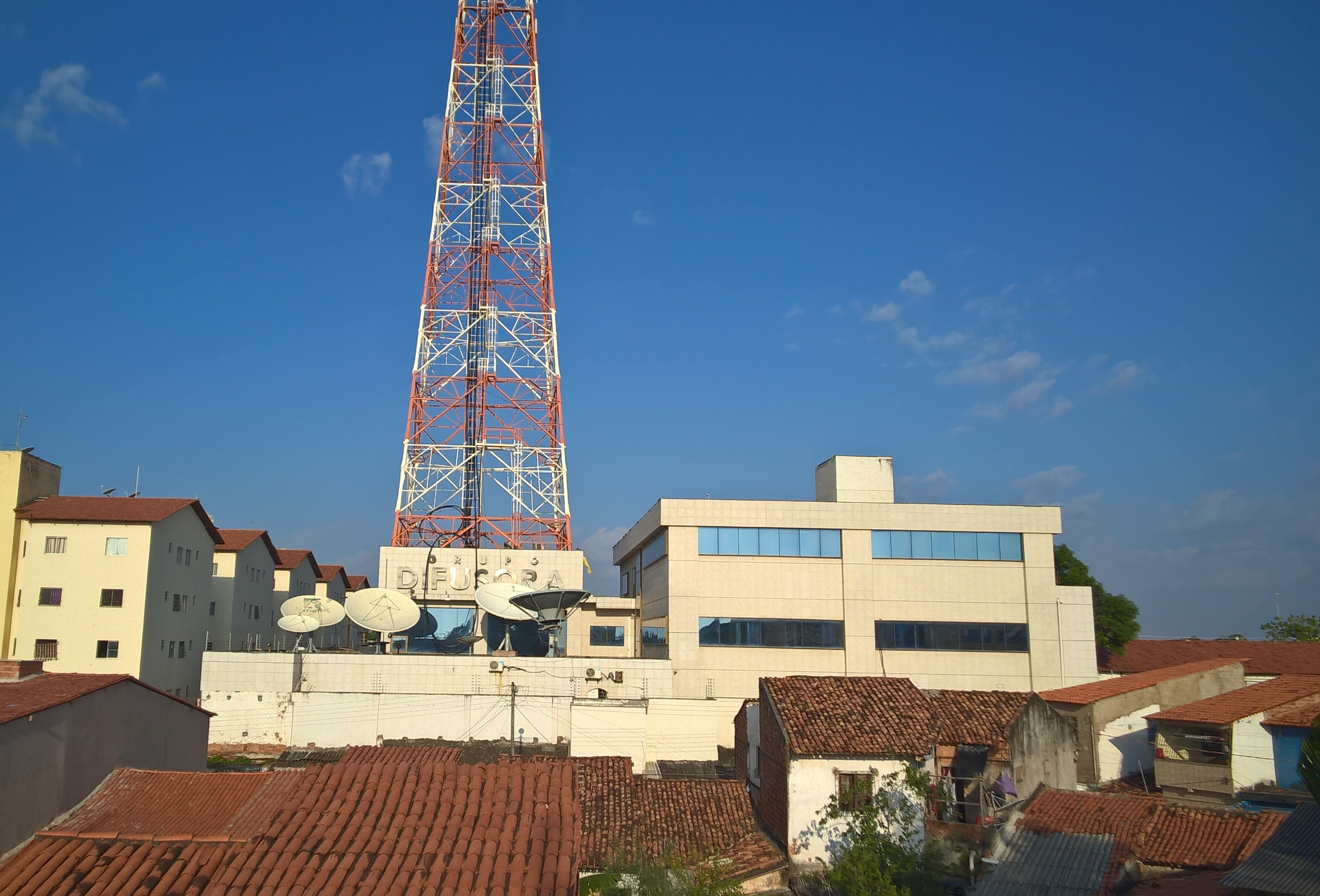
- São Luís, Maranhão; Brazil
- Channels: Digital: 38 (UHF); Virtual: 4
- Branding: Difusora

Programming
- Affiliations: SBT

Ownership
- Owner: Sistema Difusora de Comunicação; (Rádio e TV Difusora do Maranhão Ltda.)
- Sister stations: Difusora FM; Nova FM

History
- First air date: November 9, 1963
- Former call signs: ZYA 651 (1963-2018)
- Former channel numbers: Analog: 4 (VHF, 1963–2018)
- Former affiliations: REI (1966-1972); Rede Tupi (1966-1972); TV Excelsior (1966-1970); Rede Globo (1972-1991)

Technical information
- Licensing authority: ANATEL
- ERP: 6 kW
- Transmitter coordinates: 2°31′29.04″S 44°17′26.18″W

Links
- Public license information: Profile
- Website: difusoraon.com

TV Difusora São Luís (channel 4) is a television station based in the city of São Luís, capital of the state of Maranhão, Brazil affiliated with SBT. It is the flagship broadcast property of locally-based Sistema Difusora de Comunicação, which also operates other stations under the Difusora name, transmitting to several stations in the interior of the state. Founded on November 9, 1963, it is the first TV station in Maranhão.

== History ==
=== Build-up and early years ===
"Dear viewers, TV Difusora Channel 4 begins broadcasting at this moment. TV Difusora, Channel 4, a living testimony to the initiative and boldness of the people of Maranhão."

— Leonor Filho

The state of Maranhão had its first television experience in 1955, when during the controversial supplementary election for the Federal Senate, journalist and candidate Assis Chateaubriand ordered a closed circuit broadcast, carried out with the technical support of Rede de Emissoras Associadas, which he owned. Studios were prepared in the Rádio Timbira auditorium in São Luís, and televisions were installed in Largo do Carmo. Viewers were then able to follow musical numbers by Keila Vidigal and Luiz Gonzaga, under the command of announcer Carlos Frias, solely for the purpose of promoting Chateaubriand's candidacy, who ended up being elected.

However, the implementation of a television station began in the 1960s, when brothers Raimundo Bacelar and Magno Bacelar, members of an influential local political family, together with other partners, formed a company through Rádio Difusora (inaugurated by them in 1955) to obtain a concession from the Federal Government. On June 25, 1962, Prime Minister Tancredo Neves granted the concession of VHF channel 4 in São Luís to the group. At that time, plans for its implementation had already been in place since 1960, when two floors of the João Goulart Building (at the time belonging to INPS), in the center of the capital, were rented for a period of 10 years to host Radio Difusora (10th floor) and later TV Difusora (9th floor). Cr$100 million were also invested in the purchase of equipment imported from the United States and the United Kingdom.

TV Difusora was scheduled to launch in the first half of 1963, but due to delays in the assembly and installation of its equipment, its broadcasts only began on October 27 of that year, on an experimental basis. Its official inauguration was on November 9, at 8 pm, with a ceremony presented by Bernardo Almeida and José Leite Machado, in which the founder Raimundo Bacelar spoke, accompanied by his brother Magno, who would be responsible for managing the station. Then, a special show with artists from the station and musical numbers by Conjunto Farroupilha, Ellen de Lima, Francis Bento and Célio Roberto was aired at 9:30 pm, until sign-off. Also present at the event were the state governor, Newton Bello; the mayor of São Luís, Costa Rodrigues; the Minister of Justice, Abelardo Jurema, representing President João Goulart; Agnelo Alves, representing his brother Aluízio Alves, governor of Rio Grande do Norte, who was unable to attend; Vincent Rotundo, attaché at the United States embassy in Belém, Pará, and Monsignor Osmar Palhano de Jesus, who baptized its equipment. Former president Juscelino Kubitschek was also invited, however, he was only able to attend the following day, giving an exclusive interview to the station.

TV Difusora's first team, partly from Rádio Difusora, was made up of: Luiz Cardoso de Almeida, technician; Nonato Lemos (Pudim), transmitter operator; Antonio Vieira and Ribamar Fernandes (Escurinho do Samba), telecine; Haroldo Rêgo, TV direction; Douglas Santos and Euclides Marinho (Lourinho), cameras; Elvas Ribeiro (Parafuso), sound designer; Genes Celeste Soares, set design. José Leite Machado, Bernardo Almeida and Fernando Cutrim were the first presenters, while Leonor Filho and Florisvaldo Sousa were the station's standard voices. Georges Ohnet and Roberto Marassi (from TV Excelsior) were responsible for the artistic direction of the programming in its first months, and after returning to São Paulo in 1964, they were replaced by Reynaldo Faray.

On that day, few people had a television set to watch the debut of television in Maranhão, and getting the public to watch TV at the time required creativity. To publicize the new means of communication, leaflets were dropped around the city with the programming schedule, and TV equipment was also installed on electrical poles, where people gathered to watch the broadcaster. The popularity of TV Difusora was so great in its early years that during the 1964 carnaval, one of the several carnival groups at the time paid homage to the broadcaster with a march that said: "Quem viver verá, TV Difusora canal 4 funcionar".

=== Arrival of videotapes and REI and Tupi dual affiliation ===
As with other stations across the country, initially, all of TV Difusora's programming was done locally and live, as there was no videotape equipment to record the programs. The station received videotape equipment on July 9, 1966, and from then on expanded its programming with content produced by Rede das Emissoras Unidas (later renamed Rede de Emissoras Independentes, led by TV Record), Emissoras Associadas (later Rede Tupi) and TV Excelsior, which were brought by plane from São Paulo to São Luís, in bags, 2 or 3 days after being recorded, in addition to various canned foreign productions such as films and series. Even historic moments such as the first moon landing in 1969 and the 1970 FIFA World Cup were also seen on tape delay in Maranhão, since Embratel's transmission trunks only reached the state at the beginning of the following decade.

On the other hand, the number of local programs decreased considerably, also partly due to investments made to expand its signal to the interior, through microwave relays in the municipalities that bordered the São Luís-Teresina Railway, reaching the capital of Piauí (which at the time did not yet have television stations) in August 1968. The investments consumed a large part of the resources of the Difusora Communication System, which was forced to increase the number of shareholders at the end of the 60s. TV Difusora needed still modernize its own structure, and as the João Goulart Building no longer had space for this and the lease contract was about to expire, construction of the station's current headquarters began in 1969, on land donated by the state government on Rua Camboa (today Avenida Camboa), nº 120, in the neighborhood of the same name, where the Camboa fabric factory had previously operated.

The new headquarters opened on August 29, 1970, with only Rádio Difusora operations, while TV Difusora gradually moved its departments to the new address until October of the same year. The broadcaster also renewed its structure, with new transmission equipment that expanded the reach of its signal to the entire Baixada and part of the Lençóis region.

=== The Globo years ===
The period of changes at TV Difusora also had repercussions on its programming. After receiving a proposal from the directors of Rede Globo, which had already shown some programs since 1970, TV Difusora became one of its affiliates in 1972, the year in which TV Globo Nordeste was inaugurated in Recife, Pernambuco, based on a process expansion of your signal throughout the region. As a result of its affiliation with Globo, and with only TVE Maranhão (founded in 1969) as its competitor, the station began to reach exorbitant ratings, reaching 100% share for an entire day. There were also changes in programming, which began to prioritize journalism over entertainment, under strict Globo standards.

Even with considerable political influence, the Bacelar brothers continued to have difficulties managing TV Difusora, due to competition from other companies belonging to the family outside of communication with groups already established in the market, which ended up generating financial losses for the group as a whole. In 1973, having decided to live in Rio de Janeiro, Raimundo Bacelar sold his shares to his brother Magno, who from then on became the sole administrator. At the same time, Magno tried to negotiate the sale of the station to other owners, such as Grupo Liberal and Sistema Verdes Mares, without success. Despite this, TV Difusora continued to expand its signal to the interior of the state during the 1970s and 1980s, establishing partnerships with local city halls, and even other stations, such as TV Rio Balsas in 1979. The signal arrived via micro-waves, or the tapes were sent to the regions, which caused delays in relation to the original broadcast. In May 1981, the station's signal reached Marabá, Pará, through TV Marabá, which began showing part of the programs from Rede Globo and TV Difusora.

=== Political problems before changing networks ===
In 1985, TV Difusora and the other stations in the group had 50% of their shares sold to businessman and politician Francisco Coelho, state secretary of agriculture under the then governor Luiz Rocha. The sale accompanied the process of political weakening of Magno Bacelar, led by President José Sarney, once his political ally, who envisioned having Globo as the network for his future broadcaster, TV Mirante. Bacelar said years later that Sarney even put pressure on Roberto Marinho for Globo to break with TV Difusora and migrate its programming to TV Mirante at the time of its inauguration, in 1987. The change, however, was postponed due to the repercussions caused by the disaffiliation of TV Aratu in favor of TV Bahia in Salvador in the same year, also due to political motivations, which made Globo gradually renew its affiliation with TV Difusora every year until the station's sale process was completed.

Bacelar's situation worsened after the 1986 elections, when he was defeated in his candidacy for the Federal Senate, made precisely to try to save his companies. Debted with campaign costs, Bacelar sold Sistema Difusora de Comunicação at the end of 1987 to governor Epitácio Cafeteira, who was represented by orange businessman William Nagem (80% of shares) and his son, Paulo Nagem (20%). Nagem's entry into the business ended up creating another disagreement, this time between Cafeteira and Sarney, who ended up breaking up politically, since the governor intended to use the station as a means of propaganda for his future candidacy for the Senate in the 1990 elections. After its sale, the broadcaster had debts totaling more than 96 million Cruzados. One of them, with Banco do Nordeste, reached around Cz$24.3 million, and during its renegotiation, it was converted into advertising spaces throughout the program. The Government of the State of Maranhão, headed by the owner of the station, also had a major role in paying off the debts, allocating advertising funds and articles produced by SECOM that were broadcast on local news programs.

Cafeteira was successful in his candidacy for the Senate in 1990, and at the end of the year, with no interest in continuing to have media outlets, he sold Sistema Difusora to the family of elected governor Edison Lobão, with Edinho Lobão and his brothers Márcio and Luciano as the new owners of the group. A political ally of Sarney, Lobão did not create any difficulties for an exchange of affiliation between Difusora and Mirante, and the path was open.

=== As an SBT affiliate ===
On February 1, 1991, now under the command of the Lobão family, TV Difusora and TV Mirante switched affiliations, with TV Mirante becoming affiliated with Rede Globo and TV Difusora with SBT, in which both are to this day. The agreement between the two broadcasters initially defined renewal with each network every 6 years. For TV Difusora, it was the end of almost 19 years of partnership with Globo, and for TV Mirante, it was the beginning of its growth. With the change, TV Difusora saw a huge drop in audience ratings and also in the quality of its programming, which until then strictly followed the "Globo Quality Standard" and ended up giving way to SBT's "popular" style.

During the 1990s, MiniCom approved the creation of new TV stations in the interior of Maranhão. As a result, in 1997, the Difusora Communication System created the Difusora Network, generating through "Difu Sat" (the broadcaster's satellite signal in Brazil Sat) its programming for the entire state, and consequently replacing the microwave links with retransmitters via satellite.

From the 2000s onwards, TV Difusora began to feel the crisis that SBT was entering due to the advance of Rede Record from 1997 onwards, being retransmitted by TV São Luís, which led to the modification of several schedules on the station between morning and afternoon. Even so, local programs continued to be some of the most watched.

On November 9, 2012, the date of its 49th anniversary, TV Difusora launched, during the broadcast of Jornal da Difusora, its new logo, created especially to begin the celebrations of its 50th anniversary. A year later, on the same date, the broadcaster broadcast the first of 3 episodes of the documentary TV Difusora, 50 years in your home, which narrated its trajectory since 1963, showing the facts covered by the broadcaster, and how it contributed to the development of the state of Maranhão throughout its 50 years, in addition to showing testimonials from current and former journalists and presenters from the station. Then, an Algo Mais special was broadcast, where Paulinha Lobão welcomed former and current employees of TV Difusora to celebrate her birthday, namely José Raimundo Rodrigues, Zé Cirilo, Orquídea Santos, Messias Vilar, Mário Porto, Olavo Sampaio and Daucyana Castro. The station had also promoted on October 5 a show by the country duo Bruno & Marrone to celebrate their fiftieth anniversary.

At the end of 2014 and throughout 2015, TV Difusora promoted a series of layoffs in several areas, and more than 100 employees became unemployed. As a result, several programs ended up being taken off the air, and television news programs, also affected by the reduction in the number of reporters, began to have greater participation from inland stations in their content. The broadcaster entered a financial crisis and leased part of its schedule to independent programs on Saturday mornings, in addition to reducing the duration of local midday programs to include a call-in quiz show from G2P TV.

On January 12, 2016, Época magazine columnist, Leandro Loyola, published a note informing that TV Difusora was being put up for sale by Edinho Lobão. Lobão initially stated that the deal would only involve TV Difusora São Luís, with the other outlets of Sistema de Comunicação Difusora being left out of a possible transition. However, after the crisis at TV Difusora eased and there was a financial restructuring, the businessman denied that he could sell the station. Subsequently, the then federal deputy Weverton Rocha, represented by lawyer and businessman Willer Tomaz de Sousa, leased the station and Difusora FM, definitively purchasing the group in March 2020.
