= Rede Amazônica Boca do Acre =

Rede Amazônica Tabatinga
Tabatinga, Amazonas; Brazil
- Channels: Digital: 14 (UHF); Virtual: 4
- Branding: Rede Amazônica

Programming
- Affiliations: TV Globo

Ownership
- Owner: Rede Amazônica (Phelippe Daou Jr.); (Rádio TV do Amazonas Ltda.)

History
- First air date: January 1978
- Last air date: October 22, 2021
- Former names: TV Boca do Acre (1978-2015)
- Former affiliations: Rede Bandeirantes (1975-1982)

Technical information
- Licensing authority: ANATEL
- ERP: 0.25 kW

Links
- Public license information: Profile
- Website: redeglobo.globo.com/redeamazonica

Rede Amazônica Boca do Acre was a Brazilian television station based in Boca do Acre, a city in the state of Amazonas. It operated on VHF analog channel 5 and was affiliated to TV Globo. It was owned by Grupo Rede Amazônica.

== History ==
TV Boca do Acre was opened in January 1978 by journalist Philippe Daou. The broadcaster was authorized to operate by the Ministry of Communications on an exceptional basis, recognizing the difficulties in installing conventional relay stations in the northern region of the country. Like the other stations of Rede Amazônica, the station began its operations affiliated with Rede Bandeirantes, retransmitting programming through tapes recorded in Manaus by TV Amazonas.

In 1986, with the transition of Rede Globo between TV Ajuricaba and TV Amazonas in the state, TV Boca do Acre also left Bandeirantes and became affiliated with the Rio network.

On October 3, 2004, after the results of that year's municipal election were announced, TV Boca do Acre was the target of an attack by activists of the then candidate Dominguinhos Munhoz (PL), whose candidacy was challenged and the votes were annulled. The station's headquarters were set on fire, along with other establishments and a radio station. On April 22, 2016, farmers who participated in the attacks were sentenced to prison.

The station was renamed Rede Amazônica Boca do Acre on January 1, 2015.

On October 22, 2021, Rede Amazônica closed the commercial activities of Rede Amazônica Boca do Acre. As a result, the station was closed and converted into a repeater of the station in Manaus.

== Technical information ==
TV Boca do Acre was authorized to operate a digital signal on UHF channel 15 on November 4, 2011. The station, however, did not start broadcasting in the technology before it shut down.
