= Rede Amazônica Tefé =

Tefé, Amazonas; Brazil
- Channels: Digital: 14 (UHF); Virtual: 6
- Branding: Rede Amazônica

Programming
- Affiliations: TV Globo

Ownership
- Owner: Rede Amazônica (Phelippe Daou Jr.); (Rádio TV do Amazonas Ltda.)

History
- First air date: January 1978
- Last air date: October 22, 2021
- Former names: TV Tefé (1978-2015)
- Former affiliations: Rede Bandeirantes (1978-1986)

Technical information
- Licensing authority: ANATEL
- ERP: 0.25 kW

Links
- Public license information: Profile
- Website: redeglobo.globo.com/redeamazonica

Rede Amazônica Tefé was a Brazilian television station based in Tefé, a city in the state of Amazonas. It operated on VHF analog channel 6 and was affiliated to TV Globo. It was owned by Grupo Rede Amazônica.

== History ==
TV Tefé was opened in January 1978 by journalist Philippe Daou. The ceremony was attended by the Minister of Communications Quandt de Oliveira, as well as at the inauguration of TV Tabatinga. At the event, the minister received tributes for the start of the station's operations. The broadcaster was authorized to operate by the Ministry of Communications on an exceptional basis, recognizing the difficulties in installing conventional relay stations in the northern region of the country.

Like the other Rede Amazônica stations in the state, TV Tefé began its activities as an affiliate of Rede Bandeirantes, retransmitting programming through tapes recorded in Manaus by TV Amazonas due to the lack of satellite. In 1986, with the transition of Rede Globo between TV Ajuricaba and TV Amazonas, the station also left Bandeirantes and became affiliated with the Rio network.

At the end of 2002, following the expansion of the content of Rede Amazônica's mini-generators, TV Tefé hired reporter Welner Campelo. In 2005, the station received the implementation of the FTP system for sending footage to Manaus, being the last in the network to receive the technology in the first period of implementation. TV Tefé continued to rely on a local reporter until 2008, when Campelo left the station.

On September 16, 2010, TV Tefé provided technical support for the live appearance of reporter Ernesto Paglia on JN no Ar, from Rede Globo's Jornal Nacional, who visited the city and highlighted the infrastructure and mobility problems faced by residents. In 2012, despite the station inserting local commercial breaks during programming, Rede Amazônica requested the Electoral Court that TV Tefé not show the municipality's electoral campaign that year.

On January 3, 2015, like the other stations of the regional network, the station was renamed Rede Amazônica Tefé. On October 22, 2021, Rede Amazônica Tefé had its commercial department closed by Rede Amazônica, becoming a relay of the Manaus station.

== Technical information ==
TV Tefé was authorized to operate on digital television using UHF channel 15 on August 23, 2012. The station closed before officially implementing the technology.
