= TV Verdes Mares Cariri =

TV Verdes Mares Cariri (ZYA 425)
Juazeiro do Norte, Ceará; Brazil
- Channels: Digital: 33 (UHF); Virtual: 9

Programming
- Affiliations: TV Globo

Ownership
- Owner: Sistema Verdes Mares; (TV Norte do Ceará Ltda.)
- Sister stations: TV Verdes Mares Fortaleza; TV Diário; Verdinha FM; FM 93

History
- First air date: October 1, 2009
- Former channel numbers: Analog: 9 (VHF, 2009–2018)

Technical information
- Licensing authority: ANATEL
- ERP: 1,5 kW
- HAAT: 112 m (367 ft)
- Transmitter coordinates: 7°10′47.3″S 39°19′34.4″W

Links
- Public license information: Profile
- Website: redeglobo.globo.com/tvverdesmares

TV Verdes Mares Cariri (channel 9) is a television station licensed to Fortaleza, Ceará, Brazil, affiliated with TV Globo, owned-and-operated by Sistema Verdes Mares, a company of the Grupo Edson Queiroz. It was opened in 2009 to cover and generate content for the southern region of Ceará, which previously received the signal from TV Verdes Mares, in the capital Fortaleza, as its branch. Its studios are located in the São José neighborhood and its transmission antenna is in the Horto neighborhood.

== History ==
Before the creation of TV Verdes Mares Cariri, the signal from the Fortaleza station was retransmitted throughout the whole state of Ceará, and in Juazeiro do Norte it initially operated on VHF channel 4. In 2002, starting the project to open the branch in the city, the Verdes Mares System carried out a change of channels: channel 4 was transferred to TV Diário and TV Verdes Mares was moved to channel 9, until then the a repeater of Rede Vida — in order not to leave it off the air, the Verdes Mares System intermediated the request for a new grant, on UHF channel 15.

TV Verdes Mares Cariri was opened on October 1, 2009, being the 122nd affiliate of TV Globo and the second in Ceará. On the 28th of the same month, a ceremony was held to commemorate the arrival of the station at Parque de Eventos Padre Cícero, where local public figures were present, including mayors of some cities in the region and the then vice-governor of the state Francisco Pinheiro. At the station's headquarters, located on Avenida Padre Cícero, in Juazeiro do Norte, the bishop of the Diocese of Crato, Dom Fernando Panico, who held a mass, Father Marcelo Rossi and the singer Waldonys, presented to the public.

On October 17, 2019, the station was added to SKY.

== Digital television ==
=== Digital channels ===
Channel	Video	Aspect	Short name	Programming
9.1	1080i	16:9	TV VERDES MARES HD	Main TV Verdes Mares programming / TV Globo

TV Verdes Mares Cariri received the assignment to broadcast in digital signal via physical channel 33 UHF on August 28, 2012, launching it on June 5, 2014 and becoming the first station in Juazeiro do Norte to operate by the system. The inauguration ceremony of the digital signal was attended by the superintendent of Nacional Gás Edson Queiroz Neto, the state governor Cid Gomes and other public figures from the region.

=== Analog-to-digital conversion ===
Based on the federal decree overseeing the analog-to-digital conversion of television stations in Brazil, TV Verdes Mares Cariri, as well as the other stations available in Juazeiro do Norte, ceased its analog broadcasts on VHF channel 9 on October 31, 2018, in accordance with ANATEL's official roadmap. The analog shutdown was initially scheduled for September 2017, but was delayed several times depending on the delay in reaching the 90% benchmark for television sets capable to receive digital signals.

== See also ==
- TV Diário
- TV Globo
