= TV Liberal Belém =

TV Liberal Belém (ZYB 222)
- Belém, Pará; Brazil
- Channels: Digital: 21 (UHF); Virtual: 7
- Branding: TV Liberal

Programming
- Affiliations: TV Globo

Ownership
- Owner: Grupo Liberal; (Televisão Liberal S.A.)
- Sister stations: Rádio Liberal; Liberal FM; Lib Music

History
- First air date: April 27, 1976
- Former channel numbers: Analog: 7 (VHF, 1976–2018)

Technical information
- Licensing authority: ANATEL
- ERP: 10 kW
- Transmitter coordinates: 1°27′13.2″S 48°29′22.2″W

Links
- Public license information: Profile
- Website: redeglobo.globo.com/pa/tvliberal

TV Liberal Belém (channel 7) is a Brazilian television station based in Belém, capital of the state of Pará serving as affiliate of the TV Globo network for the western portion of the state. It is the flagship broadcasting property of the Grupo Liberal, which also owns six other stations in the state under the TV Liberal name covering a majority of the state, except in the eastern part of the state, which is served by TV Tapajós.

== History ==
=== Obtaining the license ===
In 1973, Pará businessman Romulo Maiorana already owned Rádio Liberal and the newspaper O Liberal, and had recently purchased the newspaper Folha do Norte from journalist Paulo Maranhão, these being the initial vehicles of the Liberal Group. That same year, the group took its first step towards getting a television channel, when on July 18, Ossian Brito, after receiving a call from his brother, the engineer and technical director of Rede Globo, Colonel Wilson de Souza Brito, informs Romulo about MiniCom's bid for a new television channel in Belém, which was published in the Official Gazette of the Union.

In 72 hours, through a partnership formed between Romulo Maiorana, Linomar Bahia (journalist and director of Rádio Liberal), Walter Guimarães, Eládio Malato, Guaracy de Brito and Ossian Brito (who would be the future director of the station), the Liberal Group entered in competition for VHF channel 7 in Belém. In October 1974, shortly after the Círio de Nazaré, Linomar Bahia received a phone call and informed Romulo that the society they had formed beat the competition. On November 13, President Ernesto Geisel grants the channel to the Liberal Group, and the following day decree nº 74,879 is published in the Official Gazette of the Union. On December 12, Televisão Belém Ltda. (former company name of the broadcaster) is officially registered with the National Telecommunications Department (DENTEL).

On July 4, 1975, DENTEL authorized the implementation, initially having as its location the headquarters of the Liberal Group, at Rua Gaspar Viana, 254, in Reduto. However, the building, which already housed the graphics park and the newsroom of the newspapers O Liberal and Folha do Norte, as well as the Rádio Liberal studios, did not have the capacity to receive a TV station. Ossian, Linomar and Wilson then had to travel around the city looking for land to build the station's headquarters, which ended up being the current number 350 Avenida Nazaré, in the Nazaré neighborhood, next to Alameda São Luiz. After negotiations to purchase the land and authorization from DENTEL, construction began on a building with 4 independent blocks and occupying an area of 2,200 m^{2}. Maiorana traveled to the United States, where he participated in the National Association of Broadcasters fair, where he purchased and ordered state-of-the-art equipment for the broadcaster, such as cameras, edit suites, cutting tables, among others. TV Liberal, as Maiorana called it, was at the time the most equipped and modern broadcaster in the country.

Amidst the preparations, Rede Globo, which had TV Guajará as its affiliate in Belém since 1967, decided not to renew its affiliation contract with the broadcaster. At the time, Ossian Brito also played a fundamental role in arranging for Globo to leave TV Guajará, having a direct line with President Geisel through his brother-in-law, General Gustavo Moraes Rego Reis, the president's advisor, who pressured Globo to transfer its affiliation with TV Liberal. Added to this, TV Guajará was also linked to one of his political opponents, senator Jarbas Passarinho, who was married to the cousin of the station's owner, Lopo de Castro. It was established that TV Liberal would assume affiliation on May 1, 1976, one day after the end of the contract and affiliation with TV Guajará.

=== Early years ===
Initially operating with a 5 kW power transmitter, TV Liberal, on an experimental basis, went on air for the first time at midnight on April 2, 1976. A selection of cartoons was shown, and after a moment, presenters Vera Cascaes and Francisco César greeted viewers and informed them that the station was on air to test its equipment. After 14 months of work, TV Liberal was ready to go live on May 1. However, due to scheduling conflicts of one of the guests at the inauguration, the minister of communications Euclides Quandt de Oliveira, the date was rescheduled to April 27.

TV Liberal was officially inaugurated on April 27, 1976, almost a year before the end of the deadline that DENTEL had given for its implementation. The station's inauguration party was practically the talk of the day in the capital of Pará. Around nine blocks around the station's headquarters, from Travessa Quintino Bocaiúva to Travessa Doutor José Moraes, in addition to the Governador José Malcher, Nazaré and Comandante Brás de Aguiar avenues, were closed or had traffic partially interrupted. Romulo Maiorana, his wife Lucidéa Maiorana and their 7 children, as well as an audience of around 500 guests, which included the state governor Aloysio Chaves, the mayor of Belém Ajáx Oliveira, as well as representatives of the military government, artists, personalities and directors from Rede Globo, such as Joseph Wallach and Walter Clark, as well as those who helped in the construction of the channel, were present at the event.

At 7:30 pm, Minister Quandt pressed a button that put the station on the air, and at the same time, the siren from the O Liberal no Reduto newsroom sounded to announce the station's entry into the air. Radio presenter Jaime Bastos read a brief text about the inauguration of the station, while his image alternated with that of the crowd watching him. Reporters Ubiratan d'Aguiar and Joaquim Antunes interviewed the guests, and after Bastos concluded his text, speeches by Maiorana, Quandt and Aloysio Chaves followed. The crowd inside and outside the station applauded, and in the nearby Alliance Française building (no longer existing), no one wanted to attend classes. Then, the guests went to the Pará Assembly, where a banquet was served in honor of the station's founding. The following day, there was a special program until April 30, which showed a replay of the station's inauguration and the history of the channel's achievement, as well as canned foreign content.

On May 1, TV Liberal officially became an affiliate of Rede Globo in the state of Pará, a condition it maintains to this day, replacing TV Guajará, which went through a period of independence until its affiliation with Rede Bandeirantes on November 1. Its initial programming consisted solely of local segments of Hoje and Jornal Nacional, each running just over five minutes. As only a handful of Globo's programs were shown at the time, the station instead received packages coming by plane from Rio de Janeiro and passing through other affiliates before arriving in Belém. TV Guajará, which had lost its affiliation with Globo, barred TV Liberal from using the Embratel satellite to carry Globo’s live programs, forcing shows such as Jornal Nacional to be recorded in Brasília and broadcast later in Belém.

From 1980 onwards, TV Liberal underwent its first administrative reforms. Ribamar Gomes, who was operations supervisor at channel 7, leaves the station. Ossian Brito, programming director, was replaced by Fernando Nascimento, who had been hired by Maiorana to take care of Rádio Liberal, and had his functions extended to television, even without experience in the area. The station, which was the best equipped in the city, did not take long to gain audience leadership, displacing TV Guajará and its biggest competitor, TV Marajoara, whose concession was revoked that year due to the bankruptcy of Rede Tupi.

In April 1986, the station's founder, Romulo Maiorana, died of cancer. All companies in the Liberal Group, including TV Liberal, are now managed by the widow Lucidéa Maiorana, and shortly afterwards, Romulo Maiorana Júnior assumes the position of CEO of the broadcaster.

=== Consolidation ===
The broadcaster entered the 1990s establishing its position as an audience leader in Greater Belém, and promoting events of local interest that brought viewers and the broadcaster even closer together, such as the Copa Liberal de Futsal and the Intercollegial Volleyball Tournament, in addition to the Race do Círio, which had been promoted since 1983, and at the beginning of the following decade it had already become the biggest athletics event in the North of Brazil.

However, competition with other TV stations is also growing, especially RBA TV, which since 1988 belonged to Jader Barbalho's Grupo RBA de Comunicação, who, like Romulo Maiorana Júnior, inherited the rivalry between the two from his father Laércio Barbalho. families in the political environment and also in the media environment, which would intensify in the following years.

Still in the 1990s, the Rômulo Maiorana Organizations began expanding the broadcaster's signal to the interior municipalities, with the creation of Rede Liberal. The project began in 1993, with the creation of TV Liberal Altamira, and over the course of the decade, 7 more stations were installed in the municipalities of Castanhal, Itaituba, Marabá, Parauapebas, Redenção, Tucuruí and Paragominas. In 1997, the broadcaster also started using the relay network of Fundação de Telecomunicações do Pará (FUNTELPA), and thus began to cover the majority of the state of Pará, except for the coverage area of TV Tapajós in Santarém.

In February 2007, after assuming command of the state government, the new management of FUNTELPA suspended the agreement signed with TV Liberal for the use of the 78 relayers of Rede Cultura do Pará under the administration of governor Almir Gabriel in 1997, and also the monthly transfer that FUNTELPA made to the broadcaster for the maintenance of the relayers, which already totaled more than 37 million reais in around ten years, ORM went to court with a request for compensation of R$3,400,000.00 due to maintenance carried out on the equipment between January and May 2007, however, the case was never judged.

On April 1, 2015, Centrais Elétricas do Pará (CELPA) began to interrupt the energy supply of 15 companies belonging to Organizações Romulo Maiorana, due to delays in payments. As a result, TV Liberal had its power cut at a relay station in Rio Maria, in addition to another one that was already deactivated in Santarém. ORM, through its media, publicly reacted to CELPA's actions by starting a public opinion campaign against the company.

=== Leadership changes ===
On October 10, 2017, the president of the broadcaster and ORM, Rômulo Maiorana Júnior, was removed from the position he held for almost 30 years, being succeeded by his brother, Ronaldo Maiorana, after a split between the family members over control of the company. Subsequently, the assets of ORM (today the Liberal Group) would be divided, and Rominho would create the Roma Group.
