= Rede Amazônica Tabatinga =

- Tabatinga, Amazonas; Brazil
- Channels: Digital: 15 (UHF); Virtual: 4
- Branding: Rede Amazônica

Programming
- Affiliations: TV Globo

Ownership
- Owner: Rede Amazônica (Phelippe Daou Jr.); (Rádio TV do Amazonas Ltda.)

History
- First air date: January 1978
- Last air date: October 22, 2021
- Former names: TV Boca do Acre (1978-2015)
- Former affiliations: Rede Bandeirantes (1975-1982)

Technical information
- Licensing authority: ANATEL
- ERP: 0.25 kW

Links
- Public license information: Profile
- Website: redeglobo.globo.com/redeamazonica

Rede Amazônica Tabatinga was a Brazilian television station based in Tabatinga, a city in the state of Amazonas. It operated on VHF analog channel 4 and was affiliated to TV Globo. It was owned by Grupo Rede Amazônica.

== History ==
TV Tabatinga was inaugurated in January 1978, in a ceremony that was attended by the bishop of the Diocese of Letícia (a neighboring Colombian city where the new station's signal would reach) and Father Alcimar Magalhães, as well as the then Minister of Communications Quandt de Oliveira and the station's founder, journalist Philippe Daou.

Initially, the station had a concession in Benjamin Constant, due to the fact that until 1983, the town of Tabatinga was still part of that municipality. The broadcaster was authorized by the Ministry of Communications on an exceptional basis, considering the difficulties of installing conventional relay stations in the northern region of the country.

Like the other Rede Amazônica stations in the state, TV Tabatinga began its activities as an affiliate of Rede Bandeirantes, retransmitting programming through tapes recorded in Manaus by TV Amazonas due to the lack of satellite. In 1986, with the transition of Rede Globo between TV Ajuricaba and TV Amazonas, the station also left Bandeirantes and became affiliated with the Rio network.

On March 31, 1997, TV Tabatinga received official authorization from the Ministry of Communications to operate on channel 4 VHF in the municipality of Tabatinga, 14 years after the political-administrative emancipation of the city. In 2004, with the aim of expanding the broadcaster's journalism participation, it was the second in the Rede Amazônica compound to receive equipment for sending reports via the internet to TV Amazonas using an FTP server, after TV Manacapuru.

On the night of July 7, 2011, a TV Tabatinga team was the only one to record the fall of a meteor, which could be seen by residents of the municipalities of Tabatinga and Santa Isabel do Rio Negro. The footage had national repercussion and was shown in the following day's edition of Jornal Hoje, on Rede Globo.

On March 19, 2012, the Public Electoral Ministry of Amazonas asked the state's Electoral Court that TV Tabatinga be ordered to stop showing advertisements for the City of Tabatinga, under penalty of a daily fine. The body understood that the pieces, in which Mayor Saul Nunes appeared presenting achievements of his administration, would be part of advance electoral propaganda for that year's municipal elections in the city, and requested the manager's conviction for broadcasting the advertisement.

On January 3, 2015, like the other stations of the regional network, the station was renamed Rede Amazônica Tabatinga. On April 27, 2020, a criminal broke into the station's facilities and stole the camera used by video reporter Rôney Elias.

On October 22, 2021, Rede Amazônica Tabatinga had its commercial department (which continued to be based in Benjamin Constant even after the station's city of concession was changed) closed by Rede Amazônica. The fact marked the closure of the station, which became a repeater of Rede Amazônica Manaus. Reporter Rôney Elias continued working in the Alto Solimões region as a correspondent.

== Technical information ==
TV Tabatinga was authorized to operate on digital television using UHF channel 15 on May 16, 2012. The station closed before officially implementing the technology.
