= TV Liberal Itaituba =

- Itaituba, Pará; Brazil
- Channels: Virtual: 13
- Branding: TV Liberal

Programming
- Affiliations: TV Globo

Ownership
- Owner: Grupo Liberal; (Televisão Liberal S.A.)

History
- First air date: June 6, 1993
- Former names: TV Muiraquitã (1993-1998)

Links
- Website: redeglobo.globo.com/pa/tvliberal

TV Liberal Itaituba (channel 13) was a TV Globo-affiliated television station based in Itaituba, a city in the Tapajós region of Pará. It was part of TV Liberal, based in Belém, and shut down in 2019, being replaced by a relay of the Belém station since then.

== History ==
=== Background (1980-1993) ===
Rede Globo's programming first arrived to Itaituba through TV Itaituba (channel 6, now TV Eldorado, a Record affiliate), founded in 1980. The station, first to operate in the city, was an affiliate of the network until 1985, when its transmitters were shut down by order of DENTEL.

=== TV Muiraquitã (1993-1998) ===
In 1993, businessman Valmir Clímaco initiated plans to launch the city's fourth television station, by granting it from a relay permission from TV Liberal Belém, granted on 13 April 1987. Initially known as TV Muiraquitã, the station was officially inaugurated on 6 June 1993, and had Emílio Carlos Piccardo as its director.

Three months after inauguration, TV Muiraquitã's transmitting tower was knocked out following a storm, rendering it off air for eight months, when a new 54-meter freestanding tower was erected. Its installation was authorized by the First Regional Air Command on 22 March 1995. Its new facilities, however, were not recognized by the Ministry of Information until 27 February 1997.

=== TV Liberal Itaituba (1998-2019) ===
In 1998, already as TV Liberal Itaituba, it ceased producing the local edition of Liberal Comunidade, due to a ban on airing local content on retransmitter stations. In 2006, with Rede Globo's intervention on TV Liberal, which led to a more stricter compliance with the network's standards, production for the local segment of Jornal Liberal 1.ª edição in all inland Pará stations, ceased, which was only responsible for producing reports to air on the main Liberal station in Belém, and on the national Globo network.

In June 2010, the station and Liberal FM Itaituba were now fully administered by Rede Liberal. Two people were sent from the state network to take part in the transfer of control between VCA Comunicações Ltda. (longtime controller of TV Liberal Itaituba) and Organizações Rômulo Maiorana.

On 31 December 2019, after 26 years on air, aV Liberal Itaituba fully ceased its activities. Until then, the station only aired commercials for local businesses. With the closure of commercial activities in Itaituba, the city became a part of TV Liberal Belém's coverage area, continuing its relay on channel 13.

== Technical information ==
TV Liberal Itaituba was authorized to begin digital broadcasts on UHF channel 20 on 21 September 2015. However, it did not start its digital broadcasts before its commercial operations ceased.

== Notable staff ==
- Cássia Rangel
- Eliel Sodré
- Udirlei Andrade
