= TV Mirante Balsas =

Balsas, Maranhão; Brazil
- Channels: Digital: 32 (UHF); Virtual: 32
- Branding: TV Mirante

Programming
- Affiliations: TV Globo

Ownership
- Owner: Grupo Mirante; (Rádio Mirante de Maranhão Ltda.)

History
- First air date: 1979
- Former call signs: ZYA 652 (1979–2025)
- Former names: TV Rio Balsas (1979–2013)
- Former channel numbers: Analog: 6 (VHF, 1979–2025); Digital: 31 (UHF, 2016–2025)

Technical information
- Licensing authority: ANATEL
- ERP: 1 kW
- Transmitter coordinates: 7°31′14.2″S 46°2′3.5″W

Links
- Public license information: Profile
- Website: redeglobo.globo.com/ma/tvmirante

TV Rio Balsas is a Brazilian television station based in Balsas, state of Maranhão. It operates on analog VHF channel 6 and digital UHF channel 31 and is affiliated to TV Globo. It is one of Rede Mirante's four stations and generates its programming for the city of Balsas.

== History ==
=== TV Rio Balsas (1979–2013) ===
The station was opened in 1979, becoming the first TV station in the city of Balsas and southern Maranhão. It affiliated with TV Difusora de São Luís do Maranhão, which in turn was affiliated with TV Globo.

In the first years of opening, the station operated with a small transmitter and a single VT to reproduce U-Matic tapes, mainly chapters of soap operas and editions of Jornal Nacional, which were shown in Balsas a week later, when the tapes arrived from São Luís transported by bus, under the responsibility of TV Difusora, which then returned to the capital of Maranhão to follow the same route and brought the same programming.

At the same time as the station's inauguration, the city began to receive new residents in the late 1970s, coming from Paraná, Santa Catarina and Rio Grande do Sul, where the city would later become the "soy capital". On December 2, 1980, just over a year after the first station went on air, the city was authorized to have the city's first radio station, Rádio Rio Balsas AM.

In 1982, when the first satellite dishes arrived in the city, the station started using new equipment, when all TV Globo programming started to be broadcast via satellite, thus putting an end to bus trips from São Luís to Balsas and vice versa, and also stopped showing programming from TV Difusora, to relay only TV Globo.

On June 19, 1987, with the publication of Decree No. 94,501, the former Ministry of Communications granted the broadcaster a concession to operate the sound and image broadcasting service in the same city for a period of 15 years, which was renewed on June 19, 1987. 2002 for another 15 years (until 2017). The Decree was published by the Official Gazette of the Union (DOU) on June 22 of the same year in Section 1, Page 9617.

On December 1, 1989, the station was opened again, this time as a TV generator in the city and remaining affiliated with Globo. At the time, the city became known as the "soy capital" (a title it still uses to this day).

In the early 90s, after operating alone for more than 10 years in the region, the city of Balsas won new television station concessions, ending the monopoly of TV Rio Balsas in the south of Maranhão.

In the 1990s and 2000s, it promoted three events annually with great participation by the population: Domingão da Mamãe (since 1998, with the participation of 4,000 mothers with prize draws donated by businesses); Miss Copão, with a parade of girls from Balsas and Copão Rio Balsas de Futebol (since 2003), the largest sporting event in the southern region of the state that included the participation of teams from the city's neighborhoods, 38 teams participated in the sporting event that lasted around three months with competitions held on Sundays.

In 2001, it became the oldest affiliate of TV Globo in Maranhão, surpassing the former affiliate TV Difusora, which was from 1968 to February 1991 (22 years). During the 2000s, the station did not show football matches in the same way as Rede Mirante.

On March 19, 2013, journalist José Martin Varão announced that TV Rio Balsas was sold to Sistema Mirante de Comunicação, chaired by businessman Fernando Sarney, son of politician and senator José Sarney.

According to journalist José Varão, the station that belonged to the former mayor of Balsas, Francisco Coelho, better known as Chico Coelho, had a disastrous administration from 2005 to 2013 (which culminated in the return of the Rocha Family in municipal command after 12 years, with Luiz Rocha Filho, son of the late Luiz Rocha), accumulating debts in the municipality and the Coelho Family. The journalist stated that the sale coincided with TV Globo's ultimatum given to the businessman, for the broadcaster to adapt to the digital transmission system, which would expire at the end of March.

As the equipment is expensive and Chico Coelho did not have the capital to invest in this purchase, TV Rio Balsas would lose its Globo affiliation at the end of March. According to Varão, in order not to lose the TV Globo signal, which would be handed over to political opponents (who were already interested), mainly the Rocha Family (which has two TV concessions in the city), he preferred to sell the concession to Sistema Mirante de Fernando Sarney, which according to the journalist, was R$8 million reais. One of Fernando Sarney's first measures was for the station to broadcast all programs from TV Mirante de São Luís, except the evening news.

In the late afternoon of April 3, at 5:00 pm, during heavy rain in the city, the broadcast tower broke almost in half, but did not fall and remained hanging, almost collapsing the tower. As a result, the signal went off the air immediately. On April 4, technicians were deployed to the city to put the station back on air. On April 8 at 9:16 am, the station returned to the air, during Mais Você.

=== TV Mirante Balsas (2013–2025) ===
On September 2, 2013, Monday, the broadcaster started to have new vignettes and local programs, with the replacement of the programs RB Notícia, RBTV 1st Edition and RBTV 2nd Edition with Mirante Notícia, JMTV 1st Edition and JMTV 2nd Edition, which were shown at the end of August. The broadcaster started to generate only the local JMTV 2nd Edition, but its coverage was expanded to 15 municipalities in the south of Maranhão.

With the new ownership, the broadcaster now has daily participation in the network's news programs (Bom Dia Mirante and JMTV 1st Edition) and two editions of Mirante Notícia. The journalism team now consists of reporters Alzira Coelho and Suzane Oliveira, in addition to film reporters Marcus Vinícius and Clésio Rocha. They will be coordinated by fellow reporter Gil Santos (ex-TV Mirante de Imperatriz).

In September 2015, with the reorganization of Rede Mirante's coverage area, the retransmitters that retransmitted the station's signal began transmitting the TV Mirante Imperatriz signal, and TV Mirante Balsas had its coverage again reduced to the municipality of Balsas.

=== End of local production and dependence on TV Mirante Imperatriz ===
On November 10, 2017, due to cost containment measures by Grupo Mirante, the broadcaster ended production of the programs JMTV 2nd edition and Mirante Notícia, and started to repeat the programming produced in São Luís in full until January 31, 2022. The following day, February 1, Grupo Mirante integrated journalistic coverage in the south of the state, regionalizing the content. As a result, the Balsas broadcaster began to be covered by the Imperatriz broadcaster's news programs during the noon and evening slots. Local commercials continue to air normally.

== Programming ==
In addition to retransmitting national programming from TV Globo, state programming from Rede Mirante and regional programming from Imperatriz, TV Mirante Balsas inserts local commercials. Several local programs were part of the broadcaster's schedule, and were discontinued:

- JMTV 2ª Edição
- Plantão TV Rio Balsas (sporadic)
- RB Notícia
- RBTV 1ª Edição
- RBTV 2ª Edição

== Technical information ==
Virtual channel	Digital channel	Screen	Content
32.1	32 UHF	1080i	TV Mirante Balsas/Globo's main schedule

The station began its digital transmissions on July 11, 2016, through UHF channel 31.

The station shut down its analog signal on June 30, 2025. In tandem, the physical channel will move from 31 to 32 and the virtual channel will be mapped to the new location (32.1).
