= TV Tapajós =

TV Tapajós (ZYB 283)
Santarém, Pará; Brazil
- Channels: Digital: 22 (UHF); Virtual: 4

Programming
- Affiliations: TV Globo

Ownership
- Owner: Sistema Tapajós de Comunicação; (Rádio e TV Tapajós Ltda.)
- Sister stations: 94 FM

History
- First air date: May 26, 1979
- Former channel numbers: Analog: 4 (VHF, 1979–2023)

Technical information
- Licensing authority: ANATEL
- Transmitter coordinates: 2°25′49.6″S 54°42′34.2″W

Links
- Public license information: Profile
- Website: redeglobo.globo.com/pa/tvtapajos

TV Tapajós is a Brazilian television station based in Santarém, a city in the state of Pará. It operates on channel 4 (22 digital UHF), and is affiliated to TV Globo. It is part of Sistema Tapajós de Comunicação, which also controls 94 FM, and is currently chaired by Vânia Pereira Maia, daughter of the station's founder, Joaquim da Costa Pereira. The Pereira family also owns the Ponta Negra Communication System, chaired by Nivaldo Pereira, however, with no links to the Tapajós Communication System.

== History ==
The history of TV Tapajós begins in 1977, with the laying of the foundation stone for the station's headquarters. The building, designed by engineer and colonel Wilson Brito, was built especially to meet its requirements, and the equipment responsible for capturing, producing and transmitting images was all state-of-the-art. The works, which were completed in 1979, were carried out by civil engineer José Eduardo Pereira de Siqueira.

The station officially opened at 5pm on May 26, 1979, through VHF channel 4 for Santarém and nearby areas. The event was attended by the station's founder, Joaquim da Costa Pereira, and guests, such as the then state governor, Alacid Nunes, and the communications minister, Haroldo Corrêa de Mattos. The station obtained Maxwell transmitters to operate, as well as expensive equipment that did not exist in Brazil yet, while announcing the launch of the station on a truck with loudspeakers. Since its foundation, it has been affiliated with Rede Globo.

In 1989, Paulo Campos Correa left the station and Joaquim da Costa Pereira restructured the company. His daughter Vânia Pereira Maia took over in 1995. Vânia digitized the equipment of both the TV station and 94 FM, eventually forming Sistema Tapajós de Comunicação.

In December 2001, the station launched its internet portal, NoTapajós.com. The portal brought together articles from the broadcaster and news from the Santarém region. On October 18, 2013, the portal was discontinued and replaced by local versions of G1 and globoesporte.com, in a standardization of Rede Globo for the content of its affiliates on the Internet, in addition to the launch of the station's new website. In 2005, Vânia obtained a digital license for the station, on UHF channel 22.

On January 6, 2010, the station's founder, Joaquim da Costa Pereira, died in Belém after a cardiac arrest resulting from pneumonia. With his death, the Tapajós Communication System companies were in the hands of his daughters, Vânia Pereira Maia and Vera Pereira.

In 2011, it was discovered that the politician and owner of Grupo RBA de Comunicação, Jader Barbalho, was a shareholder of 50% of TV Tapajós since January 3, 2001. Such company had never been declared to the Electoral Justice, and was only discovered after the death of Joaquim da Costa Pereira, when the new shareholder composition with his daughters was announced. Amid disagreements between the State Court and the Pereira family, Barbalho tried to sell his shares in TV Tapajós to the family.

On April 9, 2020, TV Tapajós started relaying part of Rede Amazônica's programming, through the Integração do Norte regional project. The partnership also enabled an exchange of journalistic content between the broadcasters, with the display of articles of regional interest in the Amazon produced by TV Tapajós on the news and programs of Rede Amazônica.
