= O Liberal =

Brazilian newspaper

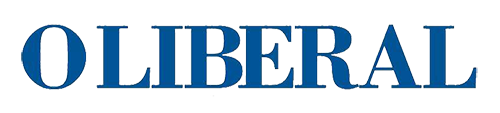
- Type: Daily newspaper
- Format: Broadsheet
- Owner: Grupo Liberal
- Founder: Magalhães Barata
- Editor: Felipe Jorge Melo
- Founded: 15 November 1946; 79 years ago
- Language: Portuguese
- Headquarters: Belém, Pará, Brazil
- Country: Brazil
- Website: www.oliberal.com

O Liberal is a Brazilian daily newspaper that has been circulating in Belém and most of the state of Pará since 1946. When it was acquired by Romulo Maiorana in 1966, it became part of the Grupo Liberal, along with the newspaper Amazônia, Rede Liberal and Rádio Liberal. O Liberal is considered a newspaper of record in the North of Brazil.

== History ==
Following World War II, political tensions in Pará escalated as Folha do Norte, an influential Belém-based newspaper, waged a fierce editorial campaign against Magalhães Barata, then the state's dominant political figure and two-time federal interventor. In response, Barata's allies — including key government officials and business leaders — founded O Liberal in 1945 as both a counterweight to Folha and the official platform of Barata's Social Democratic Party (PSD). Financed through a collective shareholding model, the newspaper quickly became instrumental in shaping pro-Barata narratives, with ownership later consolidated under him to ensure ideological cohesion during a turbulent political era marked by the aftermath of Getúlio Vargas' ouster. In 1966, businessman Romulo Maiorana and his wife, Déa Maiorana, bought the newspaper.

In 2013, it began distributing a weekly New York Times supplement.

== See also ==
- TV Liberal Belém
