= TV Centro América =

TV Centro América (ZYA 941)
Cuiabá, Mato Grosso; Brazil
- City: Cuiabá
- Channels: Digital: 24 (UHF); Virtual: 4

Programming
- Affiliations: TV Globo

Ownership
- Owner: Grupo Zahran; (Televisão Centro América Ltda.)

History
- First air date: February 13, 1967
- Former channel numbers: Analog: 4 (VHF, 1967–2018)
- Former affiliations: TV Excelsior (1967-1969); Rede Tupi (1967–1976); REI (1969–1976)

Technical information
- Licensing authority: ANATEL
- ERP: 8.5 kW
- Transmitter coordinates: 15°35′4.2″S 56°5′42.8″W

Links
- Public license information: Profile
- Website: redeglobo.globo.com/tvcentroamerica

TV Centro América is a Brazilian television station based in Cuiabá, capital of the state of Mato Grosso. It operates on channel 6 (UHF digital 30) and is affiliated to TV Globo. It belongs to Rede Matogrossense de Comunicação, a television network of the Zahran Group that operates in the states of Mato Grosso do Sul and Mato Grosso, with TV Morena being the network head for the latter.

== History ==
TV Centro América de Cuiabá was founded in the 60s by Eduardo Elias Zahran, being the first broadcaster in the city, and the second in the state, which already had TV Morena in Campo Grande. Its programming, in addition to local content, mixed programs from TV Record, TV Excelsior (until 1969) and Rede Tupi. In 1976, the broadcaster became affiliated with Rede Globo, as did the other stations of Rede Matogrossense de Televisão. In 1977, the broadcaster became the head of the network for Mato Grosso, after the separation of the southern portion of the state to create the current Mato Grosso do Sul.

On April 8, 2008, all stations adapted to the Public Prosecutor's Office's new Indicative Rating rules, when Rede Globo began to generate an alternate signal for broadcasters in a time zone with a difference of one hour less in relation to the time zone. Brasilia. The impact was noticed mainly in the times of the telenovelas and MTTV's 1st edition, which stopped being shown at 11 am and moved to 12:45 pm, after Jornal Hoje. In 2011, after some adjustments to Globo's programming on Rede Fuso, MTTV 1st Edition started to be shown at noon. During Sundays, Rede Globo's programming remained and remains in real time, due to the fact that programs on that day are rated for everyone or for those over 10 years old. That was until February 17, 2017, when the station announced on its social networks the return of real-time programming with the end of Rede Fuso broadcasts. As a result, its newscasts started 1 hour earlier on February 19, 2017.

In April 2011, TV Centro América joined g1, Globo's news portal, with updated news and information from Mato Grosso.

== Technical information ==
| Virtual channel | Digital channel | Screen | Content |
|---|---|---|---|
| 4.1 | 24 UHF | 1080i | TV Centro América/Globo's main schedule |

The broadcaster opened its digital signal on December 16, 2008, being the first station in Cuiabá and the first in Mato Grosso to operate using the new technology, the city became the eighth state capital to turn on such signals.

Based on the federal decree transitioning Brazilian TV stations from analogue to digital signals, TV Centro América, as well as the other stations in Cuiabá, ceased broadcasting on VHF channel 4 on August 14, 2018, following the official schedule from ANATEL.

== Programming ==
In addition to retransmitting TV Globo's national programming, TV Centro América produces and broadcasts the following programs:

- Bom Dia Mato Grosso: News, with Jaqueline Naujorks and Tiago Terciotty;
- MTTV 1.ª edição: News, with Cleto Kipper;
- Globo Esporte MT: Sports news, with Flávio Santos;
- MTTV 2.ª edição: News, with Luzimar Collares;
- MT Rural: Agribusiness, with Bruno Bortolozo;
- Mais Agro: Agribusiness news, com Kátia Krüger.

Since February 1, 2021, TV Centro América and its stations in the interior of the state have shown the news program Hora Um da Notícia with a one-hour delay, to broadcast Bom Dia MS at a timeslot that is more accessible to the public. To make this happen, the station shows the Terra da Gente program before the news, produced by EPTV, the network's affiliate in the interior of São Paulo.
