= Liberal Arts (disambiguation) =

Liberal arts is an academic program in Western higher education, which traditionally covers the natural sciences, social sciences, arts, and humanities.

Liberal Arts may refer to:

- Liberal Arts (film), a 2012 film directed by Josh Radnor
- Liberal Arts, Inc., a former American corporation founded in 1946
