= TV Mirante São Luís =

TV Mirante São Luís (ZYP 141)
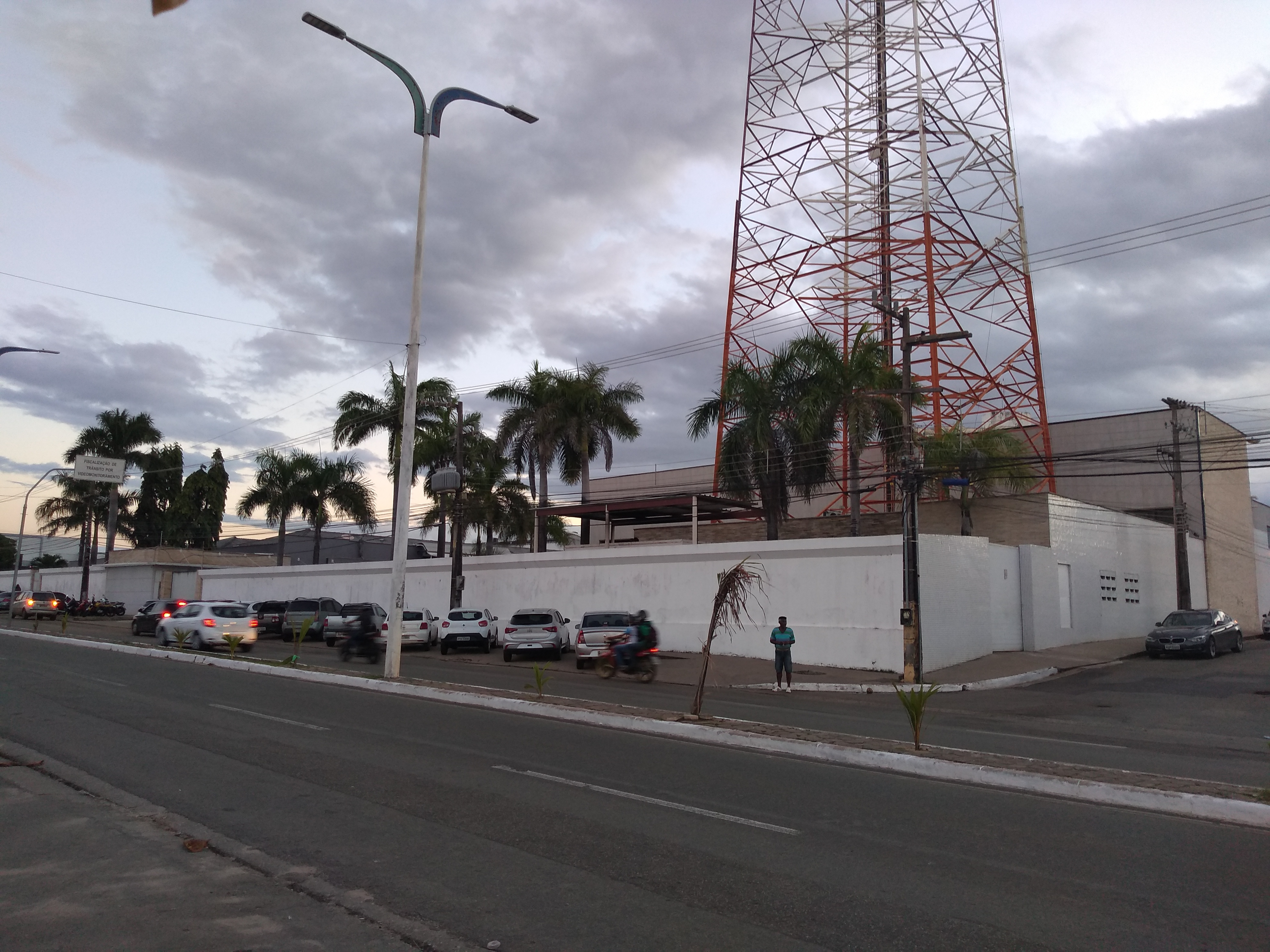

São Luís, Maranhão; Brazil
- Channels: Digital: 29 (UHF); Virtual: 10
- Branding: TV Mirante

Programming
- Affiliations: TV Globo

Ownership
- Owner: Grupo Mirante; (Rádio Mirante do Maranhão Ltda.)
- Sister stations: Mirante News FM; Mirante FM

History
- Founded: 1983
- First air date: March 15, 1987
- Former call signs: ZYA 656 (1987-2018)
- Former channel numbers: Analog: 10 (VHF, 1987–2018)
- Former affiliations: SBT (1987-1991)

Technical information
- Licensing authority: ANATEL
- ERP: 10 kW
- Transmitter coordinates: 2°30′21.3″S 44°18′17.2″W

Links
- Public license information: Profile
- Website: redeglobo.globo.com/ma/tvmirante

TV Mirante São Luís (channel 10) is a Brazilian television station based in São Luís, the capital of the state of Maranhão serving as an affiliate of TV Globo for the city and the north of the state. It is the flagship broadcasting property of the locally-based Grupo Mirante, which also owns three other stations in the state under the TV Mirante name in Imperatriz, Codó and Balsas, all four stations are part of the TV Mirante network.

== History ==
=== Background ===
The initial step towards the emergence of the station was taken in 1983, when José Sarney, through a partnership between his children Fernando Sarney, Roseana Sarney and his daughter-in-law Teresa Sarney, received the grant for channel 10 VHF in São Luís. The deadline for implementing the station expired in 1985 and the project had not yet been completed at that time. With the help of the then interior minister Mario Andreazza, Sarney managed to extend the deadline until 1987, and after becoming president of the Republic he managed to get the project going with an investment of around 800 thousand dollars.

During the preparations for the launch of the station, Sarney negotiated with Magno Bacelar, owner of TV Difusora, a change of affiliation, so that TV Mirante would debut as an affiliate of Rede Globo. Bacelar refused the proposal, while Globo renewed the affiliation contract for another 5 years, and TV Mirante then had to affiliate with SBT. Fernando Sarney opted for Silvio Santos' network, because in a comparison with Rede Manchete, his second option, SBT had 22% of the commercial pie and 19% of the average audience, compared to 1.5% and 2.3% for Manchete, respectively.

=== SBT phase ===
TV Mirante was officially inaugurated on the afternoon of March 15, 1987, with a ceremony held in its studios in São Francisco and broadcast live by the station. The Archbishop of São Luis, Dom Paulo Eduardo Andrade Ponte baptized the studios and equipment, imported from Japan, and soon afterwards the first program was shown, the news program Mirante Notícias, presented by Valéria Pedrosa and Nilton Serra.

The inauguration of the station then materialized the formation of the Mirante Communication System, which already included TV Imperatriz (currently TV Mirante Imperatriz), the radio stations Mirante FM in São Luís, Verdes Campos de Pinheiro, Mearim de Caxias and the newspaper O Estado do Maranhão.

=== Globo phase ===
On February 1, 1991, TV Mirante left SBT and became affiliated with Rede Globo, changing affiliation with TV Difusora and fulfilling the desire of the owners since its foundation. The station then began broadcasting in a chain with TV Mirante Imperatriz, forming Rede Mirante, which today also has stations in Caxias and Balsas.

With the change of affiliation, the broadcaster then assumes the audience leadership, previously held by TV Difusora. Over the course of the decade, several investments were made in technology and expansion of the signal to locations in the interior of Maranhão, as well as integration with the other broadcasters that make up the network in the production of materials for television news.

At the end of the 2000s, TV Mirante promoted a series of reforms in the structure of its headquarters in São Luís, which now has a new journalism newsroom, from where the news programs would start to be presented in 2010, in addition to a new tower transmission 110 meters high, prepared for digital transmissions that began in the same year.

On April 29, 2010, lightning struck TV Mirante's facilities, damaging equipment and harming its telephone lines, as well as the operation of the group's radio stations. The lightning also affected the station's digital transmission equipment, causing the debut of its digital signal to be postponed. On March 15, 2012, the station began offering local versions of the G1 and globoesporte.com portals, as well as other Rede Globo affiliates.

== Technical information ==
Virtual channel	Digital channel	Screen	Content
10.1	29 UHF	1080i	Main TV Mirante São Luís programming/Globo
10.2	29 UHF	1080i	TV Educação MA (Futura)

The broadcaster began its digital transmissions on December 9, 2009, on an experimental basis, through channel 29 UHF, being the first broadcaster in Maranhão to operate using the new technology. On December 21 of the same year, the then communications minister Hélio Costa came to São Luís to sign the consignment agreement for the broadcaster's digital channel, as well as those for TV Difusora and TV Brasil Maranhão.

With the lightning that hit the station on April 29, 2010, the digital signal, which was still on an experimental basis, ended up going off the air after the equipment was damaged. The broadcaster's engineering department worked to solve the problem and only reestablished the digital signal on May 1. As a result, the official launch that was scheduled for March 15 (the broadcaster's 23rd anniversary date) was postponed to May 3. At 6:55 pm, during JMTV 2nd edition, the station officially started its digital transmissions with a ceremony held at its headquarters, where the president of Sistema Mirante de Comunicação, Teresa Sarney, as well as several employees and guests were present. Among the representatives of Rede Globo, Octávio Florisbal, general director, Artur Villela, manager of Affiliate Engineering and Expansion, Cláudia Quaresma, director of the Affiliate Relationship Center, among other executives, were present.

The station's first program to be produced in high definition was Repórter Mirante, still during experimental broadcasts in 2010. The other programs and news only started to be produced and shown in this format on December 16, 2013.

On March 8, 2021, in partnership with the Government of the State of Maranhão, the broadcaster aired TV Educação, through subchannel 10.2, to broadcast teleclasses to students in the state education network who were unable to go to school due to the coronavirus pandemic. In June, the vacant spaces in the teleclass programming began to have Canal Futura programming relayed.

=== Analog-to-digital conversion ===
Based on the federal decree on the transition of Brazilian TV stations from analog to digital signals, TV Mirante, as well as other stations in São Luís and the metropolitan region, ceased broadcasting on channel 10 VHF on March 28, 2018, following the official ANATEL roadmap. The station ended analog transmissions at 11:59 pm, after broadcasting the semi-final of the Campeonato Carioca between Flamengo and Botafogo, along with extra coverage of the semi-final of the Campeonato Paulista between Corinthians and São Paulo, which extended to a penalty shootout which ended minutes before the switch-off, when the broadcaster then inserted the MCTIC and ANATEL slide about the switch-off.
