= RBA TV =

RBA TV (ZYP 271)
- Belém, Pará; Brazil
- Channels: Digital: 35 (UHF); Virtual: 13

Programming
- Affiliations: Rede Bandeirantes

Ownership
- Owner: Grupo RBA de Comunicação; (Sistema Clube do Pará de Comunicação Ltda.)

History
- First air date: December 15, 1988
- Former call signs: ZYB 203 (1988-2018)
- Former channel numbers: Analog: 13 (VHF, 1988–2018)
- Former affiliations: Rede Manchete (1988–1993)

Technical information
- Licensing authority: ANATEL
- ERP: 12 kW

Links
- Public license information: Profile
- Website: dol.com.br

RBA TV (channel 13, acronym for Rede Brasil Amazônia de Televisão) is a regional Brazilian television network based in Belém, capital of the state of Pará serving as an affiliate of Rede Bandeirantes for most of state. It is the flagship broadcasting property of the locally based Grupo RBA de Comunicação, a company of politician and businessman Jader Barbalho, which also owns five other stations under the RBA TV name.

== History ==
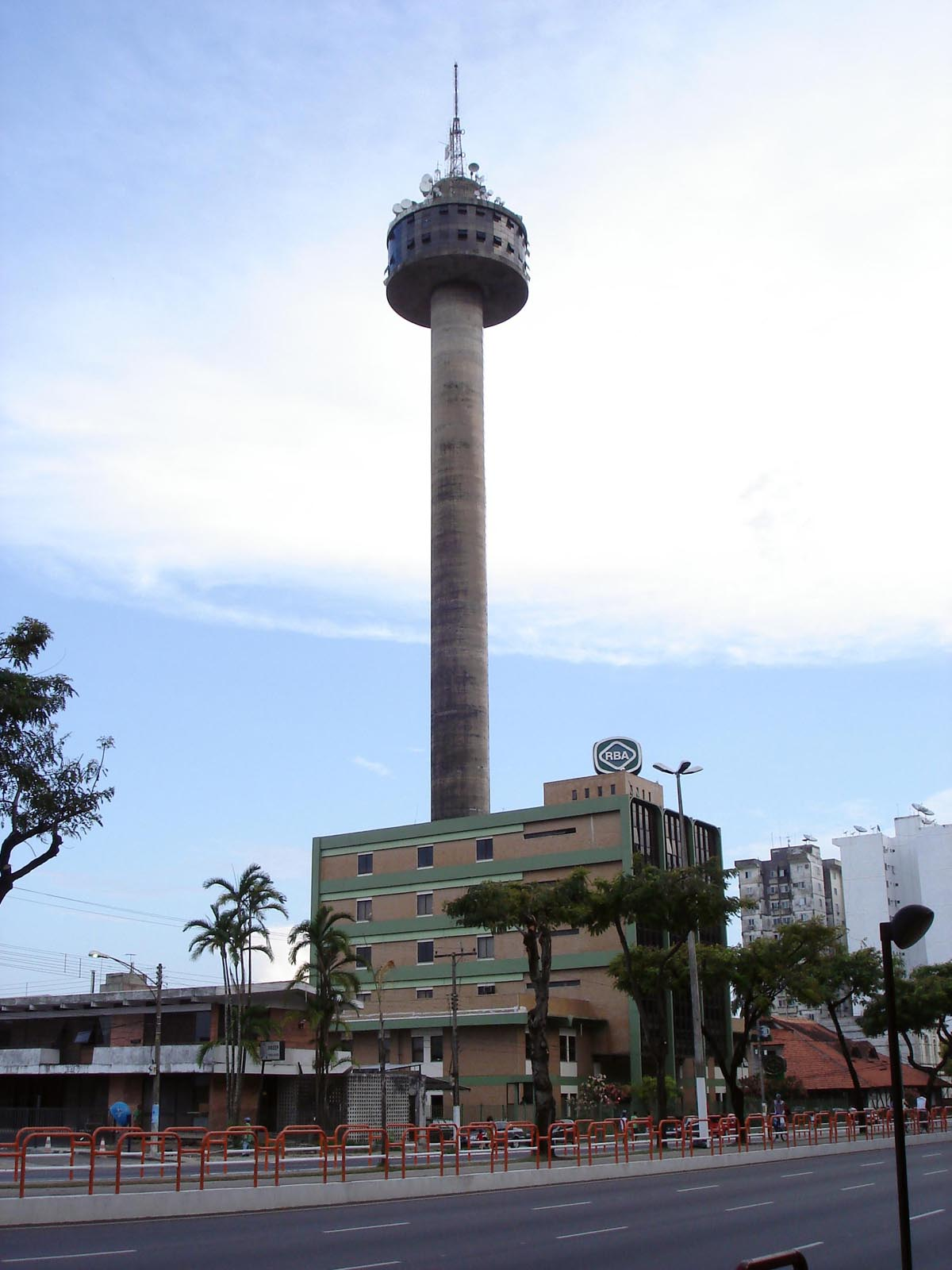
RBA's headquarters and tower in 2005

It went live on December 15, 1988, by businessman Jair Bernardino, then owner of the Volkswagen Belauto Dealership, as an affiliate of Rede Manchete. RBA was the most modern Brazilian TV station in the North-Northeast, with assets valued at around US$93 million. With the inauguration of RBA, Bernardino had three companies in the North (TV, gas and vehicle dealership). Entrepreneur and innovative, he invited great journalists to work on RBA's local television journalism, which was a reference for the country. The station became the first in the country to use the computerized newsroom system and also to abolish the use of videotape for reporting, using the high-speed fiber optic system. The name Rede Brasil Amazônia (which forms the acronym RBA) originated from an idea of creating a television network with a strong regional influence. Local programming initially consisted of the news program RBA em Manchete (following the Rede Manchete programming pattern) in three daily editions, RBA Debate and RBA Esporte.

On August 5, 1989, Bernardino died in an air disaster in Guajará Bay, near the city of Belém. His relatives took over the station. In October of the same year, the station broadcast the Círio de Nazaré for the first time, but was a pioneer in covering the Romaria Fluvial live.

In 1990, the station was sold by Bernardino's relatives to local politician Jader Barbalho, at the time elected governor of the state of Pará. The station was purchased for more than US$13 million, money whose origin was never explained, as it was not is consistent with the salary of a parliamentarian, the only activity carried out by Jader, who never had a signed work permit.

At the turn of 1990 to 1991, the broadcaster created Fogos na Torre, which became an annual tradition until the turn of 2019 to 2020 in front of the channel's headquarters. The pyrotechnic show, which was broadcast live, lasted 15 minutes and used to attract a large number of people on Avenida Almirante Barroso. At the same time, the celebration also caused controversy, due to the fact that the RBA Group's headquarters were located on the other side of Bosque Rodrigues Alves, causing irritation to the animals due to the noise of the fireworks, which generated protests.

In 1992, the station created Barra Pesada, which would soon become one of the channel's biggest ratings successes at lunchtime and which currently occupies the first hours of the RBA day. The program, of a community nature, highlighted events in Belém and the Metropolitan Region, but drew attention due to the sensationalist content of the reports and the colorful tone in the coverage of some prisons. Also in the same year, the station launched Camisa 13, which to this day opens the channel's programming.
