= National Telecommunications Agency (Brazil) =

Telecommunications regulator of Brazil

- Agência Nacional de Telecomunicações

Agency overview
- Formed: 16 July 1997; 28 years ago
- Jurisdiction: Federal government of Brazil
- Headquarters: SAUS Quadra 06 Blocos C E, F e H Brasília, Federal District
- Annual budget: R$ 612.9 million (2023)
- Agency executive: Carlos Manuel Baigori, Chairperson
- Parent department: Ministry of Communications
- Website: www.gov.br/anatel

Footnotes
- ASN: 61656

The National Telecommunications Agency (Portuguese: Agência Nacional de Telecomunicações) or Anatel is a special agency in Brazil created by the general telecommunications act (Law 9472, 16/07/1997) in 1997 and governed by Decree 2338 of 07/10/1997. The agency is administratively and financially independent, and not hierarchically subordinate to any government agency. Its decisions can only be appealed in court. From the Ministry of Communications, Anatel has inherited the powers of granting, regulating, and supervising telecommunications in Brazil as well as much technical expertise and other material assets.

== Certification of Telecommunication Products by Anatel ==
The certification of telecommunication equipment in Brazil is regulated by the National Telecommunications Agency (Anatel). This process is required for all telecommunication products intended for sale or use in the country. It ensures that such equipment complies with established technical, safety, and performance standards, contributing to the reliability and security of Brazil’s telecommunications network.

The certification process is structured as follows:

Submission of Documentation: Manufacturers or importers must provide comprehensive technical documentation for the product, including specifications, schematics, and operational manuals.

Laboratory Testing: Equipment is subject to testing in laboratories accredited by ANATEL to verify compliance with regulatory standards and technical requirements.

Certification Approval: Upon successful completion of testing and documentation review, ANATEL issues a certificate of compliance, authorizing the product for sale and use within Brazil.

Product Identification: Certified equipment must be labeled with the ANATEL logo and an approval number, indicating conformity with the agency’s standards.

The certification process can be complex and often requires extensive knowledge of regulatory frameworks and technical procedures. To assist with these requirements, manufacturers frequently engage specialized certification bodies or consultants. These entities facilitate the application process, coordinate testing, and ensure adherence to ANATEL’s regulatory framework.

== See also ==
- Federal institutions of Brazil
- List of regulatory organizations of Brazil
- Telecommunications in Brazil
- National Communications Authority (Portugal)
