= 1976 in Brazilian television =

This is a list of Brazilian television related events from 1976.

== Events ==
- March 5: TV Globo unveils a new identity.
- April 27: TV Liberal starts broadcasting in Belém, enabling the city to regain its Globo affiliation lost by TV Guajará the previous year due to several factors.
- May 14: TVS Rio is launched by Silvio Santos to replace TV Excelsior.
- June 4: A major fire hits TV Globo's headquarters in Rio de Janeiro. The fire is caused by a short circuit in the air conditioning system and starts on the second floor of the building on Rua Von Martius in Jardim Botânico.
- June 7: The telenovela O Casarão, written by Lauro César Muniz, premieres on TV Globo.
- July 17: Esporte Espetacular from TV Globo presents the opening ceremony of the XXI Olympic Games, with narration by Ciro José.
- August 1: The closing ceremony of the XXI Olympic Games is also broadcast live on TV Globo.
- September 11: TV Gazeta, in the state of Espírito Santo, is inaugurated and becomes the 17th station to join the television network affiliated of TV Globo.

== Debuts ==
- 24 December - Turma da Mônica (1976–present)

== Television shows ==
=== 1970s ===
- Vila Sésamo (1972-1977, 2007–present)

== Networks and services ==
=== Launches ===
Network	Type	Launch date	Notes	Source
TV Liberal Belém	Terrestrial	27 April		
TVS Rio	Terrestrial	14 May		
TV Parintins	Terrestrial	5 September		
TV Gazeta Vitória	Terrestrial	11 September		
TV Ji-Paraná	Terrestrial	13 September		
TV Marabá	Terrestrial	9 November		

== Births ==
- 21 July - Emanuelle Araújo, singer & actress
- 10 August - Mariana Santos, actress & comedian
- 29 August - Luana Piovani, actress & model
- 8 October - Karina Bacchi, actress & model
- 25 October - Rafael Cortez, actor, journalist, comedian & TV host

== See also ==
- 1976 in Brazil
