= Rede Amazônica Jaru =

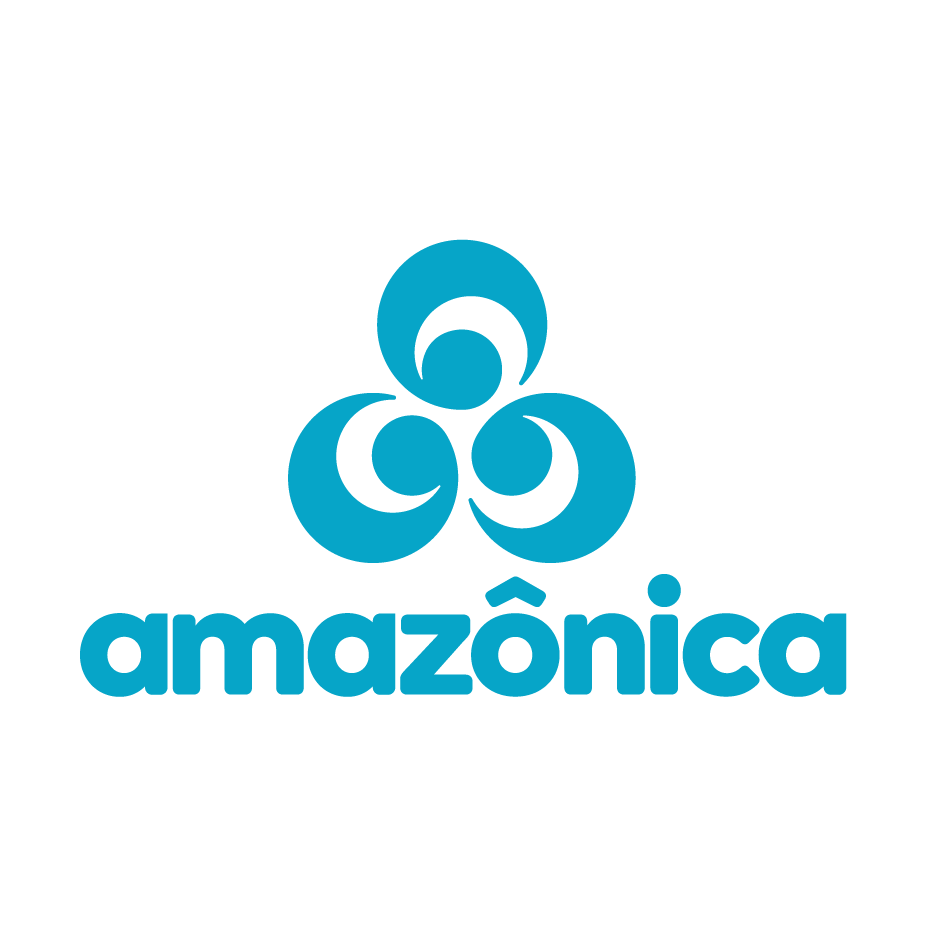

Jaru, Rondônia; Brazil
- Channels: Analog: 10 (VHF); Digital: 23 (UHF); Virtual: 10
- Branding: Rede Amazônica

Programming
- Affiliations: TV Globo

Ownership
- Owner: Rede Amazônica (Phelippe Daou Jr.); (Rádio TV do Amazonas Ltda.)

History
- First air date: June 13, 1979
- Last air date: May 24, 2023
- Former names: TV Jaru (1976–2015)
- Former affiliations: Rede Bandeirantes (1979–1983)

Technical information
- Licensing authority: ANATEL
- ERP: 0.05 kW
- Transmitter coordinates: 10°26′4.1″S 62°27′54″W

Links
- Public license information: Profile
- Website: redeglobo.globo.com/redeamazonica

Rede Amazônica Jaru was a Brazilian television station based in Jaru, a city in the state of Rondônia. It operated VHF analog channel 10 and digital UHF channel 23 and was affiliated with TV Globo. It was owned by Grupo Rede Amazônica.

== History ==
=== TV Jaru (1979-2015) ===
Rede Amazônica received the authorization to operate a relay station in Jaru on June 13, 1979. This led to the creation of TV Jaru, which relayed programs from Rede Bandeirantes from tapes. Due to the lack of satellite signals until 1982, the station was waiting for the sale of all sponsorship quotas to show video tapes of soccer matches.

On January 24, 1983, following the decision taken from other stations of the network (except TV Amazonas and the stations in inland Amazonas), TV Jaru left Rede Bandeirantes and became an affiliate of Rede Globo.

In 2005, TV Jaru hired journalist Robert Muracami, who began producing reports for Rede Amazônica's news programs and the local news bulletins 24 Horas, shown during the station's commercial breaks. As a result, it also began to include local commercials. The production of these bulletins continued until 2007, when Robert left the station. Following his exit, TV Jaru stopped producing news items on its own, and the station was now being served by the news division of TV Ariquemes.

=== Rede Amazônica Jaru (2015-2023) ===
As of January 3, 2015, like the other stations on the network, the station stopped identifying itself as TV Jaru, starting to use the name Rede Amazônica Jaru. In 2018, the station once again had an exclusive reporter, when video reporter Rinaldo Moreira was hired. In March of that year, a live link from the reporter during Jornal de Rondônia 1st Edition had national repercussions due to an accident with a Military Police vehicle, which hit him while he was on air. He, however, resumed participating in the news shortly afterwards, clarifying that he was fine.

On May 1, 2020, Rede Amazônica Jaru started to retransmit the local edition of Jornal de Rondônia 2nd Edition produced by Rede Amazônica Ariquemes, presented by Luiz Martins. On May 24, 2023, Rede Amazônica Jaru had its commercial department closed, which marked its shutdown. With that, the station officially became a relayer of Rede Amazônica Porto Velho.

== Technical information ==
Virtual channel	Digital channel	Screen	Content
10.1	23 UHF	1080i	Rede Amazônica Jaru/Globo's main schedule

TV Jaru received the digital signal grant in Jaru for UHF channel 23 in May 2012. As Rede Amazônica Jaru, the station started operating with the technology on December 5, 2022.

== Programas ==
As well as relaying Rede Amazônica Porto Velho's statewide programming and TV Globo's national output, Rede Amazônica Jaru inserted local commercials and aired the following programs:

- 24 Horas
- Jornal de Rondônia 2ª Edição (generated by Rede Amazônica Ariquemes)

== Staff ==
=== Former members ===
- Rinaldo Moreira
- Robert Muracami

== See also ==
- Rede Amazônica
- Rede Amazônica Porto Velho
- TV Globo
