= Rede Amazônica Coari =

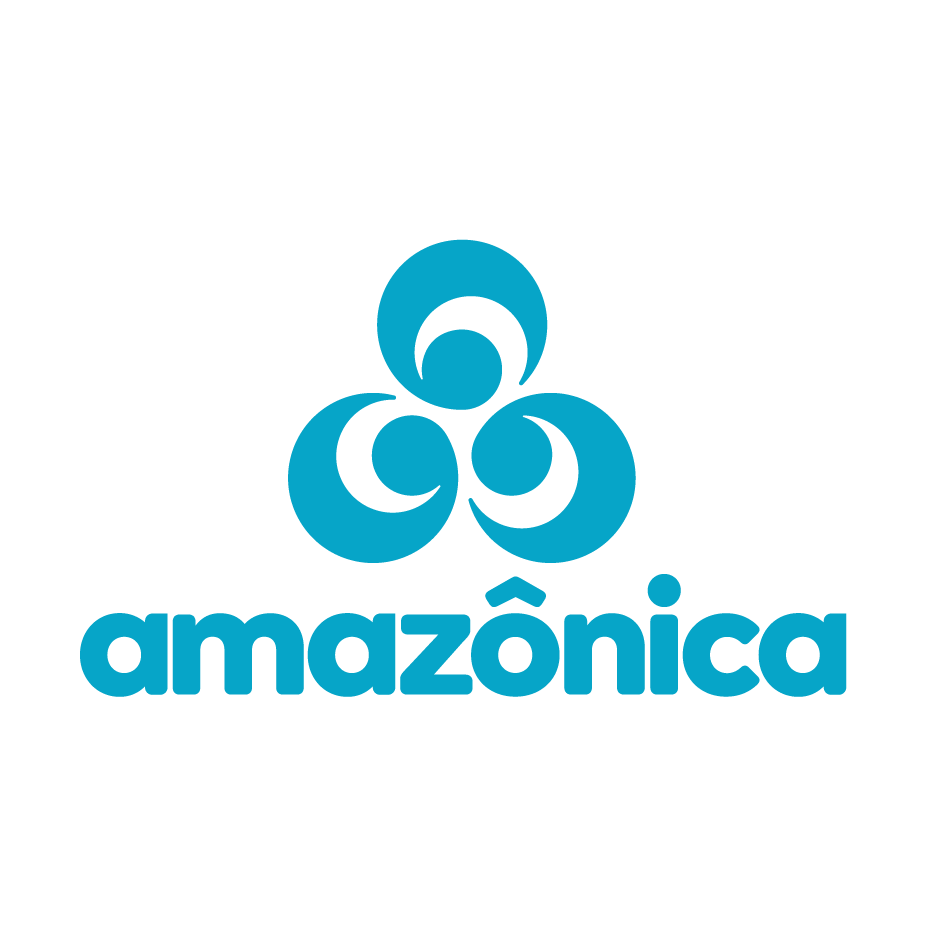

Coari, Amazonas; Brazil
- Channels: Analog: 3; Digital: 15 (UHF); Virtual: 3
- Branding: Rede Amazônica

Programming
- Affiliations: TV Globo

Ownership
- Owner: Rede Amazônica (Phelippe Daou Jr.); (Rádio TV do Amazonas Ltda.)

History
- First air date: December 1976
- Former names: TV Coari (2005-2015)

Technical information
- Licensing authority: ANATEL
- ERP: 0.25 kW
- Transmitter coordinates: 4°05′33.5″S 63°08′24.6″W

Links
- Public license information: Profile
- Website: redeglobo.globo.com/redeamazonica

Rede Amazônica Coari is a Brazilian television station based in Coari, a city in the state of Amazonas. It operates on analog VHF channel 3 and digital UHF channel 15 (virtual 3.1), and is an affiliate of TV Globo. The station is owned by Grupo Rede Amazônica.

== History ==
TV Coari was inaugurated on August 2, 2005, during the commemorations of the 73rd anniversary of the founding of Coari. The ceremony was attended by the founder and owner of Rede Amazônica, the journalist Phelippe Daou, as well as the mayor Adail Pinheiro and the governor Eduardo Braga. In addition to retransmitting TV Amazonas programming, the mini-generator inserted local advertising during breaks and had a system for sending materials to the network via the internet, having been the third Rede Amazônica station with this technology.

On February 8, 2010, TV Coari took a stand in solidarity with Nova Coari FM, which had been set on fire by hooded men on the same day.

On August 15, 2012, after manager Waldecy Fontenele stated that TV Coari had the capacity to broadcast free electoral hours with advertisements for candidates for mayor of Coari in the elections of that year, the judge of the 8th Electoral Zone of Coari, Sabrina Cumba Ferreira, granted a request from the coalition Com a Força do Povo, from candidate Arnaldo Mitouso (PMN).

The measure, however, displeased Rede Amazônica, which filed a precautionary action asking for the suspension of the broadcast of election hours in Coari, stating that TV Coari would not have the structure to broadcast election programs, despite the generation of local commercial breaks. The company also stated that the station manager could not speak on behalf of TV Amazonas. The injunction was granted on August 21, and Waldecy was fired the following day.

On January 3, 2015, following the pattern of the other Rede Amazônica stations, TV Coari became known as Rede Amazônica Coari. In 2017, it gained a reporter again, through the hiring of journalist Caio Fonseca.

On June 23, 2023, Rede Amazônica announced that Rede Amazônica Coari would now feature local journalism and display local advertisements, becoming officially considered an affiliate of TV Globo. The changes were announced together with similar news on Rede Amazônica Humaitá, which also did not have local programming.

From July 3, 2013, Rede Amazônica Coari aired a local newscast for the first time, with the relay of Jornal do Amazonas 2ª Edição (Interior), presented by Leandro Guedes and shared with Rede Amazônica Itacoatiara, Rede Amazônica Manacapuru and Rede Amazônica Parintins.

== Technical information ==
Virtual channel	Digital channel	Aspect ratio	Content
3.1	15 UHF	1080i	Rede Amazônica Coari/Globo's main schedule
