= Rede Amazônica Guajará-Mirim =

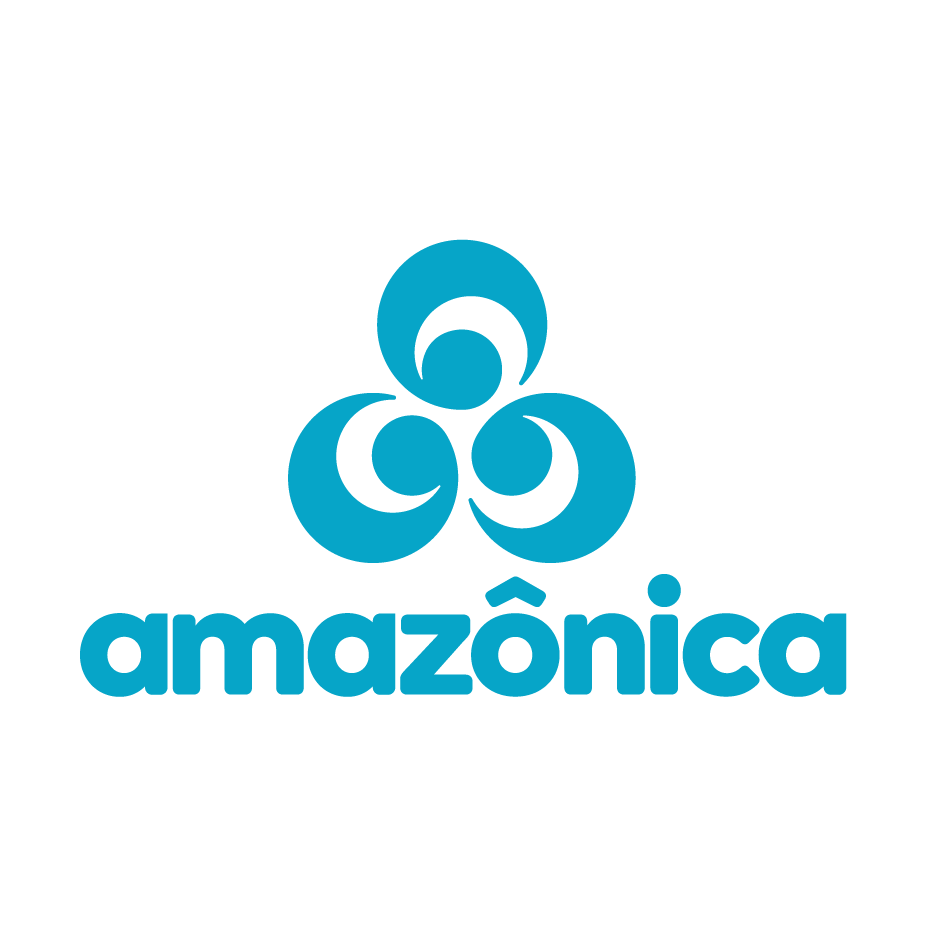

Guajará-Mirim, Rondônia; Brazil
- Channels: Digital: 14 (UHF); Virtual: 3
- Branding: Rede Amazônica

Programming
- Affiliations: TV Globo

Ownership
- Owner: Rede Amazônica (Phelippe Daou Jr.); (Rádio TV do Amazonas Ltda.)

History
- First air date: September 13, 1974
- Former names: TV Guajará-Mirim (1974-2015)
- Former affiliations: Rede Bandeirantes (1974-1986)

Technical information
- Licensing authority: ANATEL
- ERP: 0.5 kW
- Transmitter coordinates: 10°46′40.5″S 65°19′35.6″W

Links
- Public license information: Profile
- Website: redeglobo.globo.com/redeamazonica

Rede Amazônica Guajará-Mirim (channel 3) was a Brazilian television station based in Guajará-Mirim, a city in the state of Rondônia, serving as an affiliate of TV Globo. The station was a part of Grupo Rede Amazônica and operated on analog channel 3 and digital channel 14.

== History ==
The station was founded on September 13, 1974, as TV Guajará-Mirim by journalist Phelippe Daou, on the same day as TV Rondônia in Porto Velho, being one of the first two television stations in the state (at the time territory) of Rondônia. Initially, like the other stations owned by the Rede Amazônica complex, it was a Rede Bandeirantes affiliate. The station's initial facilities were located at a building owned by the local authorities.

In its beginnings, TV Guajará-Mirim only aired an eight-hour schedule, signing on at 4pm and signing off at midnight. Rede Bandeirantes' programming arrived by means of tapes.

In 1983, following the other stations of the network (except TV Amazonas, which did so in 1986), TV Guajará-Mirim left Rede Bandeirantes and joined Rede Globo.

In 1992, TV Guajará-Mirim started producing the local edition of Jornal de Rondônia.

From January 3, 2015, the station was renamed Rede Amazônica Guajará-Mirim.

In October 2022, the station closed its commercial activities and became a full-time repeater of Rede Amazônica Porto Velho.

== Technical information ==
Virtual channel	Digital channel	Aspect ratio	Content
3.1	14 UHF	1080i	Rede Amazônica Guajará-Mirim/Globo's main schedule

Rede Amazônica Guajará-Mirim started its digital broadcasts on virtual UHF channel 14 on June 13, 2018, becoming the last station of the Rede Amazônica compound in the state to adopt this technology.
