= Rede Amazônica Manacapuru =

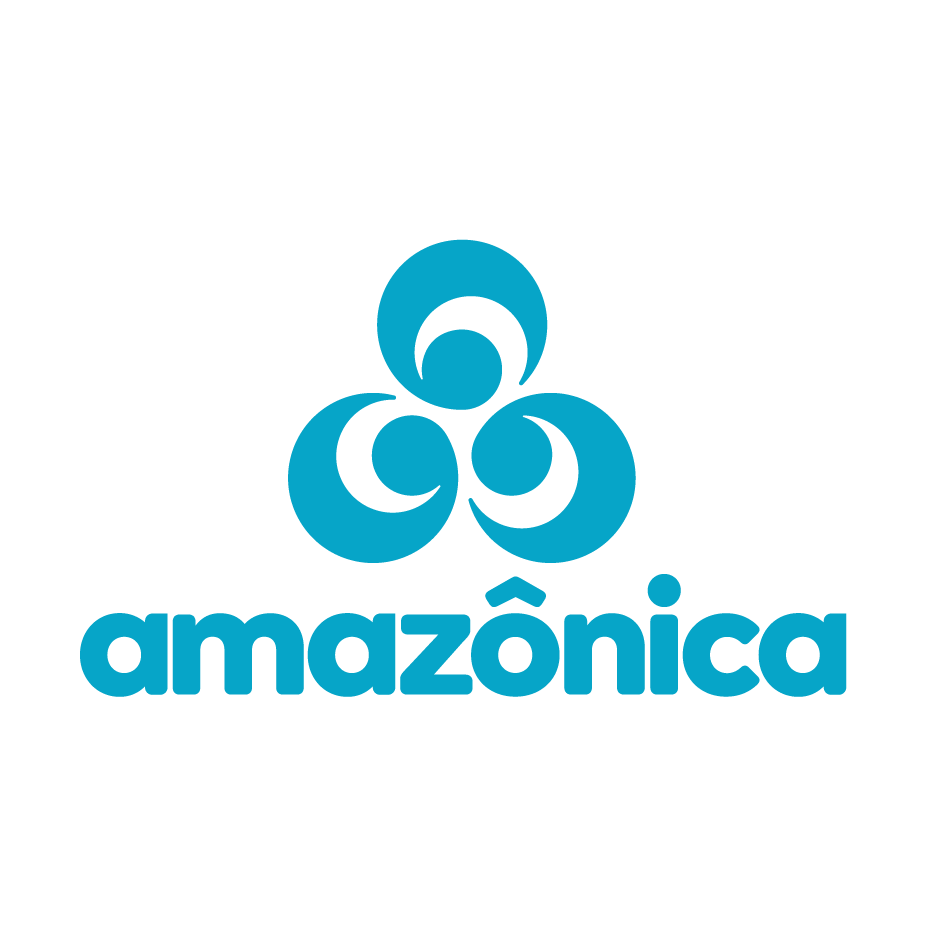

Manacapuru, Amazonas; Brazil
- Channels: Analog: 12; Digital: 16 (UHF); Virtual: 12
- Branding: Rede Amazônica

Programming
- Affiliations: TV Globo

Ownership
- Owner: Rede Amazônica (Phelippe Daou Jr.); (Rádio TV do Amazonas Ltda.)

History
- Founded: May 26, 1981
- First air date: May 26, 1981
- Former names: TV Manacapuru (1981-2015)
- Former affiliations: Rede Bandeirantes (1981-1986)

Technical information
- Licensing authority: ANATEL
- ERP: 0.25 kW
- Transmitter coordinates: 3°18′00.6″S 60°36′50.9″W

Links
- Public license information: Profile
- Website: redeglobo.globo.com/redeamazonica

Rede Amazônica Manacapuru is a Brazilian television station based in Manacapuru, a city in the state of Amazonas. It operates on analog channel 12 and digital channel 16 (virtual 12.1) and is affiliated to TV Globo. It belongs to Grupo Rede Amazônica.

== History ==
TV Manacapuru was opened on May 26, 1981, with the aim of improving the reception of TV Amazonas programming by the population, since the signal coming from Manaus had low quality in the city. Like the other Rede Amazônica stations in the state, TV Manacapuru began its activities as an affiliate of Rede Bandeirantes, and in 1986, it became an affiliate of Rede Globo, following the move made by TV Amazonas. Initially, it did not have local programming, relaying entirely the signal of TV Amazonas.

In December 2003, Rede Amazônica invested in TV Manacapuru to enable the production of local television journalism. Professor Adauto Silva was hired to act as a video reporter for the station. From then on, the station also started showing local commercials during programming breaks, in addition to the 24 Horas news updates.

On March 3, 2004, an FTP system was installed at the station, a system that allowed the transmission of materials via the internet to TV Amazonas. On the same day, the first report sent from this system was shown in Jornal do Amazonas. The action made TV Manacapuru a pioneer in this technology among Rede Amazônica stations.

On January 3, 2015, following the pattern of Rede Amazônica, TV Manacapuru was renamed Rede Amazônica Manacapuru. On October 1, 2022, 41 years after signing on, Rede Amazônica Manacapuru was officially considered a TV Globo affiliate, due to its entrance in the network's Coverage Atlas. In the same month, it started airing the regional edition of Jornal do Amazonas 2ª Edição (Médio e Baixo Amazonas), shared with Rede Amazônica Itacoatiara and Rede Amazônica Parintins.

== Technical information ==
Virtual channel	Digital channel	Aspect ratio	Content
12.1	16 UHF	1080i	Rede Amazônica Manacapuru/Globo's main schedule
