= Rede Amazônica Humaitá =

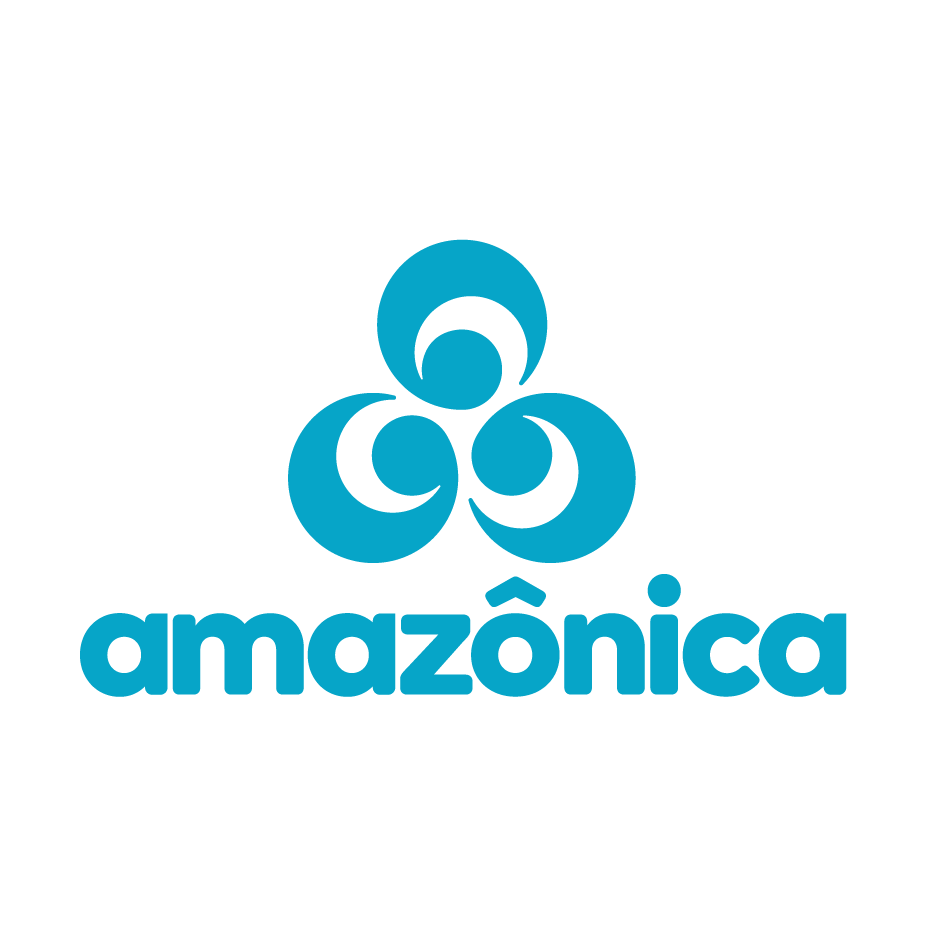

Humaitá, Amazonas; Brazil
- Channels: Analog: 6; Digital: 15 (UHF); Virtual: 6
- Branding: Rede Amazônica

Programming
- Affiliations: TV Globo

Ownership
- Owner: Rede Amazônica (Phelippe Daou Jr.); (Rádio TV do Amazonas Ltda.)

History
- First air date: December 1983
- Former names: TV Humaitá (1983-2015)
- Former affiliations: Rede Bandeirantes (1983-1986)

Technical information
- Licensing authority: ANATEL
- ERP: 0.25 kW
- Transmitter coordinates: 7°30′05.5″S 63°01′46.9″W

Links
- Public license information: Profile
- Website: redeglobo.globo.com/redeamazonica

Rede Amazônica Humaitá is a Brazilian television station based in Humaitá, a city in the state of Amazonas. It operates on analog VHF channel 6 and digital UHF channel 15 (virtual 6.1), and is an affiliate of TV Globo. The station is owned by Grupo Rede Amazônica.

== History ==
TV Humaitá was opened in December 1983, in a partnership between Rede Amazônica and the public authorities and representatives of commerce and the Humaitá community, who jointly purchased the equipment. Like the other Rede Amazônica stations in the state, TV Humaitá began its activities affiliated with Rede Bandeirantes. In 1986, with the transition of Rede Globo between TV Ajuricaba and TV Amazonas, the station also left Bandeirantes and became affiliated with the Rio network.

On December 18, 2014, as part of celebrations for the station's 31st anniversary, TV Humaitá received investments in the purchase of new equipment and the construction of a new headquarters. The inauguration of the new facilities had a ceremony in the presence of authorities such as councilors, secretaries and the mayor of Humaitá Dedei Lobo. The event was recorded by a team from Rede Amazônica Porto Velho.

On January 3, 2015, following the pattern of the other Rede Amazônica stations, TV Humaitá became known as Rede Amazônica Humaitá. In 2016, two years after Rede Amazônica's promise for the creation of a local reporting team in the city, the then administrator Raolin Magalhães started to act as a reporter, and the station started sending reports to the network's news programs.

On July 8, 2020, broadcaster reporter Lucas Lobo was physically attacked by former mayor Herivâneo Seixas, while trying to interview him about the investigation by the Amazonas Public Ministry that investigated the hiring of a company to supply rapid tests for the COVID-19 detection without bidding. The politician also ripped off the microphone and took it to the car, in addition to taking and breaking the journalist's cell phone, who registered a report at the police station.

On June 23, 2023, Rede Amazônica announced that Rede Amazônia Humaitá would now feature local journalism and display local advertisements, becoming officially considered an affiliate of TV Globo. The changes at the Humaitá station were announced together with the inauguration of the Rede Amazônica Coari.

On July 3, 2023, Rede Amazônica Humaitá began showing its own local edition of a news program for the first time after 39 years, with the debut of Jornal do Amazonas 2nd Edition, presented by Karla Melo. As with the group's other stations in the interior of the states, the news is generated in the Rede Amazônica studios in Manaus.

== Technical information ==
Virtual channel	Digital channel	Aspect ratio	Content
6.1	15 UHF	1080i	Rede Amazônica Humaitá/Globo's main schedule
