= Rede Amazônica Rorainópolis =

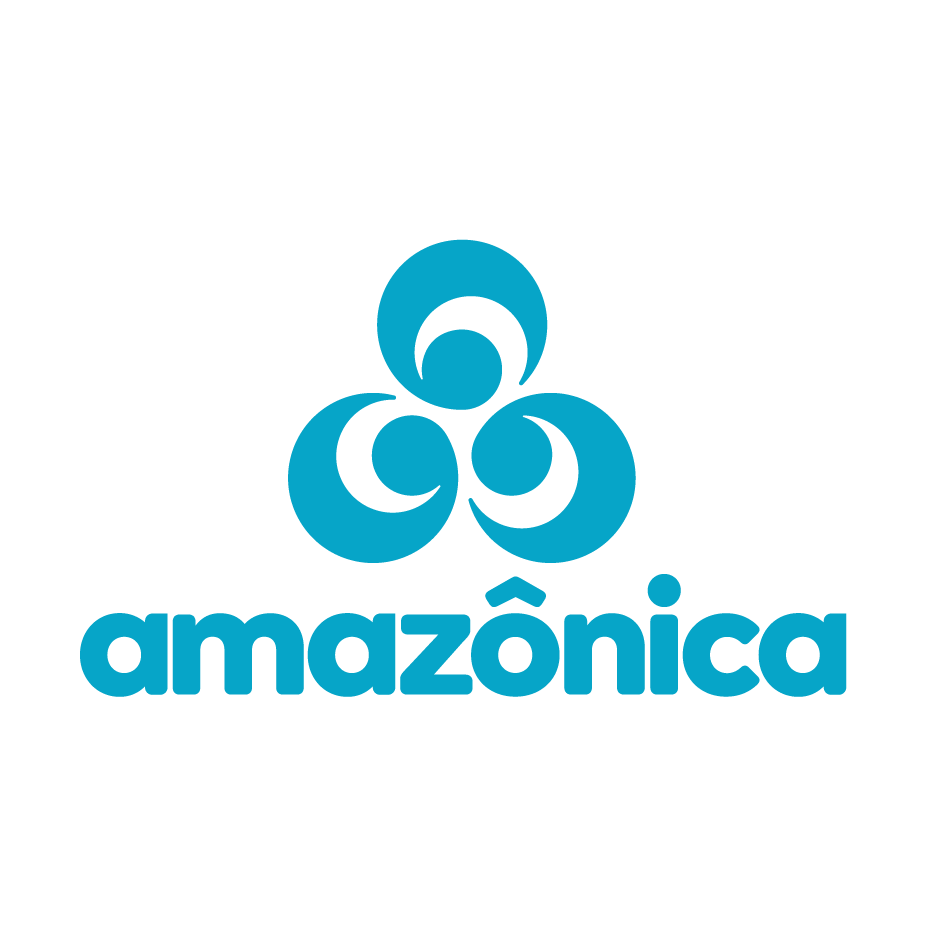
- Rorainópolis, Roraima; Brazil
- Channels: Analog: 11 (VHF); Digital: 18 (UHF); Virtual: 11
- Branding: Rede Amazônica

Programming
- Affiliations: TV Globo

Ownership
- Owner: Grupo Rede Amazônica (Phelippe Daou Jr.); (Rádio TV do Amazonas Ltda.)

History
- Founded: August 11, 2002
- First air date: April 6, 2005
- Former names: TV Rorainópolis (2005–2013)

Technical information
- Licensing authority: ANATEL
- ERP: 0.1 kW
- Transmitter coordinates: 0°56′17.5″N 60°26′00.8″W

Links
- Public license information: Profile
- Website: redeglobo.globo.com/redeamazonica

Rede Amazônica Rorainópolis (channel 11) is a Brazilian television station based in Rorainópolis, a city in the state of Roraima, serving as an affiliate of the TV Globo network in most of the state. It is owned-and-operated by Grupo Rede Amazônica and was launched April 6, 2005 as the first television station in the interior of Roraima.

In 2013, the station's local programming was shuttered as part of a cost-cutting move done by Rede Amazônica but returned in 2023.

== History ==
Nearly three years after receiving authorization for VHF channel 11 in the municipality of Rorainópolis, on August 11, 2002, Rede Amazônica founded the first television station in the interior of Roraima. On April 6, 2005, TV Rorainópolis was opened. The station produced a local segment of Jornal de Roraima and news bulletins during programming. The station replaced retransmitters of sister station TV Roraima in Rorainópolis.

In May 2009, TV Rorainópolis requested permission from the Regional Electoral Court of Roraima not to broadcast party political propaganda during the year, claiming that it did not have the technical capacity to generate and display the programs, despite broadcasting local commercials during programming. The request was accepted by the TRE judges.

On April 9, 2013, three days after the station's eighth anniversary celebrations, Rede Amazônica, through TV Roraima, announced the end of TV Rorainópolis' activities as a microgenerator, extinguishing local production. The reason would be the generation of local commercials, which is not allowed by Rede Globo for microgenerators not recognized in the Coverage Atlas, which was the case of the Rorainópolis station.

The station's transmission structure continued to operate as a repeater. The city now has only one correspondent reporter to send reports to TV Roraima and the interstate news programs of Rede Amazônica, produced by TV Amazonas.

On March 10, 2023, Rede Amazônica announced the reactivation of the TV Rorainópolis structure in the municipality, directing the station to cover five municipalities in the southern region of Roraima. The relaunch of the station was announced at an event that took place on the same day, with the presence of governor Antonio Denarium and mayors of the cities covered by Rede Amazônica Rorainópolis, in addition to executives from Grupo Rede Amazônica.

The station officially reopened on July 1, returning to insert local commercials after ten years. On July 3, the local edition of Jornal de Roraima 2nd Edition relaunched, presented by Carolina França. As with the group's other stations in the interior of the states, the news is generated in the Rede Amazônica studios in Manaus.

== Technical information ==
Virtual channel	Digital channel	Aspect ratio	Content
11.1	18 UHF	1080i	Main Rede Amazônica programming / Globo

Rede Amazônica received the concession to operate the digital signal on the Rorainópolis repeater through UHF channel 18. The technology was installed at the relaunch of the station, on July 1, 2023.

== Programs ==
As well as relaying Rede Amazônica Boa Vista's statewide programming TV Globo's national output, Rede Amazônica Rorainópolis airs the following program:

- Jornal de Roraima 2.ª Edição: News, with Carolina França; (Note: Despite focusing on the southern region of Roraima and being shown by the Rorainópolis broadcaster, the news program is currently not produced in the city, being generated in the studios of Rede Amazônica in Manaus.)

The station also used to produce 24 Horas news updates, which aired during commercial breaks.

== Staff ==
=== Current members ===
- Carolina França
- Ester Arruda
