= Mereghetti =

Mereghetti is a surname of Italian origin. Notable people with the surname include:

- Mario Mereghetti (born 1938), Italian footballer
- Paolo Mereghetti (born 1949), Italian film critic

== See also ==
- Meneghetti
