= TV Cultura (Porto Velho) =

Porto Velho, Rondônia; Brazil
- Channels: Analog: 11
- Branding: TV Cultura

Programming
- Affiliations: Independent

History
- First air date: June 14, 1974
- Last air date: September 1974

Technical information
- Licensing authority: ANATEL

TV Cultura (channel 11) was the first television station in the state of Rondônia, Brazil. It operated for approximately three months in 1974. It's unknown what caused its closure.

== History ==
Negotiations were made with TV Globo in Rio de Janeiro to find technical and logistical support.

The station was founded on June 14, 1974 with a U-Matic tape machine whose initial goal was to broadcast matches of the 1974 FIFA World Cup on a one-day delay. The station's transmitter and studios were located at an improvised room at Salão Vargas. The station was initially only authorized to broadcast the matches, as part of a government policy for all state capitals, including those still without television (such as Porto Velho) to watch the event. For this end, the station had technical support from Embratel to deliver the matches. However, the station had plans to continue programming after the World Cup had ended. The sports team that covered the World Cup was G-35 from Rádio Caiari.

With a post-World Cup continuation in mind, Nelson Townes, Dimas Queiroz de Oliveira and Dílson Machado Fernandes held talks with governor Marques Henriques, in order to use the telecine machine for local programming. On the early hours of June 15, the station was broadcasting its first local program. In order to broadcast, the station used the name TV Educativa de Rondônia, because it was a government station. Shortly before 1am, the transmitter was ready to broadcast the signals, in closed circuit format, but there were concerns over the possibility that the signal could be "leaked". Those viewers already had television reception experience, as they DXed signals from Colombia, Peru and Bolivia. Some viewers who received the local broadcast on channel 11 noticed that the first broadcasts complained about the politics Porto Velho at the time, causing complaints from viewers in the Caiari neighborhood - its initial coverage area. Upon becoming aware of the situation, the station cut its first broadcast and apologized, saying that the whole affair was a joke. The station was also reportedly received in Guajará-Mirim.

The opening theme of TV Cultura was sourced from The Ten Commandments, which was accompanied by its station identification slide. It was played every day at sign-on in the late afternoon hours. All of its local programming was live, as the station could not afford recording its programs on a U-Matic machine. It had a news bulletin presented by Vinicius Danin and a variety show on Saturday nights, Osmar Vilhena Show, where its presenter emulated Chacrinha.

At the end of the World Cup, Marcos Henriques negotiated in Brasília to grant a special permit for the station to continue operating. TV Acre, for instance, broadcast a temporary signal during the course of the event and later shut down, before returning to the air a few years later. The public competition for a TV station was eventually won by Phelippe Daou's TV Rondônia (channel 4), which at the time was a Bandeirantes affiliate (currently a Globo affiliate). When the new station started broadcasting, it absorbed most of TV Cultura's staff.
