= Rede Amazônica Cruzeiro do Sul =

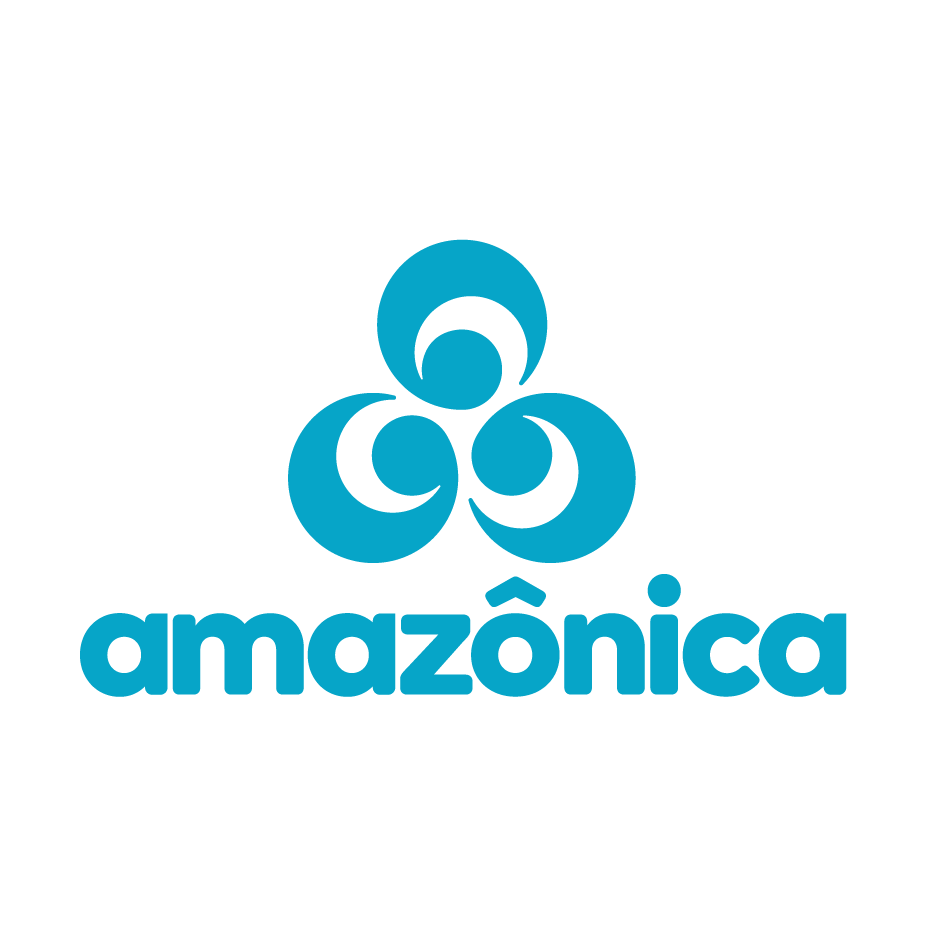
- Cruzeiro do Sul, Acre; Brazil
- Channels: Analog: 5 (VHF); Digital: 22 (UHF); Virtual: 5
- Branding: Rede Amazônica

Programming
- Affiliations: TV Globo

Ownership
- Owner: Rede Amazônica (Phelippe Daou Jr.); (Rádio TV do Amazonas Ltda.)

History
- Founded: 1980
- First air date: 1985
- Former names: TV Cruzeiro do Sul (1985-2015)
- Former affiliations: Rede Bandeirantes (1985)

Technical information
- Licensing authority: ANATEL
- ERP: 0.3 kW
- Transmitter coordinates: 9°56′23.9″S 67°49′54.1″W

Links
- Public license information: Profile
- Website: redeglobo.globo.com/redeamazonica

Rede Amazônica Cruzeiro do Sul (channel 5) is a TV Globo-affiliated television station based in Cruzeiro do Sul, a city in the state of Acre. It is part of Grupo Rede Amazônica and one of the two affiliates in the state, the other being in the state capital Rio Branco.

== History ==
The station went on air in 1980, on an experimental basis, showing programs from Rede Bandeirantes (a network with which all Rede Amazônica stations were affiliated) through tapes, always on tape delay. In 1985, the station was officially opened by journalist Phelippe Daou as TV Cruzeiro do Sul, affiliated to Rede Globo.

In the early 2000s, TV Cruzeiro do Sul stopped producing the local edition of Jornal do Acre, its only local production.

On June 14, 2006, TV Cruzeiro do Sul suffered a breakdown and went off the air. According to Adriana Negreiros, then administrative manager of the station, emergency measures were taken to avoid a general breakdown, and a technician was sent by Rede Amazônica to try to solve the problem, which was not resolved due to the lack of necessary parts. On June 29, the broadcaster began using a reserve transmitter, which operated at only 10% of capacity, with its programming temporarily shown on UHF channel 19, where an Amazon Sat retransmitter originally operated. The problem was only resolved in July. The sstation's breakdown had major repercussions in the city, as many Cruzeiro residents were unable to watch the World Cup matches, broadcast by Rede Globo.

As of January 3, 2015, the station stopped identifying itself as TV Cruzeiro do Sul, starting to use the nomenclature Rede Amazônica Cruzeiro do Sul.

In September 2016, the station produced local segments of Acre TV, on the occasion of interviews with candidates for mayor of Cruzeiro do Sul in that year's municipal elections. The interviews were carried out by journalist Jefson Dourado, from Rede Amazônica Rio Branco.

On July 23, 2018, after restructuring, Rede Amazônica Cruzeiro do Sul returned to regularly produce a local news program after almost fifteen years of the suspension of the station's local productions: a local segment of Jornal do Acre 2nd Edition. The newscast continued to be shown until 2019.

On May 15, 2023, after four years without producing local news programs, Rede Amazônica Cruzeiro do Sul relaunched a local edition of Jornal do Acre 2nd Edition, presented by Ronaldo Lima. As with other Rede Amazônica stations in the interior of the states, the news is produced directly from the network's studios in Manaus, Amazonas.

== Technical information ==
Virtual channel	Digital channel	Aspect ratio	Content
5.1	22 UHF	1080i	Rede Amazônica Cruzeiro do Sul/Globo's main schedule

Rede Amazônica Cruzeiro do Sul began its digital transmissions on UHF channel 22 in August 2018.

== Programming ==
In addition to retransmitting national programming from TV Globo and state programming from Rede Amazônica Rio Branco, Rede Amazônica Cruzeiro do Sul airs the following program:

- Jornal do Acre 2ª Edição: News, com Ronaldo Lima;

Several other local programs made up the station's schedule, and were discontinued:

- Acre TV (local segment)
- Boletim 24 Horas
- Jornal Cruzeiro do Sul

== Staff ==
=== Current members ===
- Rayza Lima
- Ronaldo Lima

=== Former members ===
- Bruno Vinicius
- Francisco Costa
- Gledisson Albano
- Mona Moura
