= 1976 in Brazil =

Events in the year 1976 in Brazil.

== Incumbents ==
=== Federal government ===
- President: General Ernesto Geisel
- Vice President: General Adalberto Pereira dos Santos

=== Governors ===
- Acre: Vacant
- Alagoas: Divaldo Suruagy
- Amazonas: Henoch da Silva Reis
- Bahia: Roberto Santos
- Ceará: José Adauto Bezerra
- Espírito Santo: Élcio Álvares
- Goiás: Irapuan Costa Jr.
- Maranhão: Oswaldo da Costa Nunes Freire
- Mato Grosso: Jose Garcia Neto
- Minas Gerais: Aureliano Chaves
- Pará: Aloysio Chaves
- Paraíba: Ivan Bichara
- Paraná: Jaime Canet Júnior
- Pernambuco: Francisco Moura Cavalcanti
- Piauí: Dirceu Arcoverde
- Rio de Janeiro: Floriano P. Faria Lima
- Rio Grande do Norte: Tarcisio de Vasconcelos Maia
- Rio Grande do Sul: Sinval Sebastião Duarte Guazzelli
- Santa Catarina: Antônio Carlos Konder Reis
- São Paulo: Paulo Egídio Martins
- Sergipe: José Rollemberg

=== Vice governors ===
- Acre: Omar Sabino de Paula
- Alagoas:
  - Antônio Gomes de Barro (until 12 September)
  - Vacant thereafter (from 12 September)
- Amazonas: João Bosco Ramos de Lima
- Bahia: Edvaldo Brandão Correia
- Ceará: José Waldemar de Alcântara e Silva
- Espírito Santo: Carlos Alberto Lindenberg von Schilgen
- Goiás: José Luís Bittencourt
- Maranhão: José Duailibe Murad
- Mato Grosso: Cássio Leite de Barros
- Minas Gerais: Levindo Ozanam Coelho
- Pará: Clovis Silva de Morais Rego
- Paraíba: Dorgival Terceiro Neto
- Paraná: Octávio Cesário Pereira Júnior
- Pernambuco: Paulo Gustavo de Araújo Cunha
- Piauí: Djalma Martins Veloso
- Rio de Janeiro: Vacant
- Rio Grande do Norte: Geraldo Melo
- Rio Grande do Sul: José Augusto Amaral de Sousa
- Santa Catarina: Marcos Henrique Büechler
- São Paulo: Ferreira Filho
- Sergipe: Antônio Ribeiro Sotelo

== Events ==
- Unknown Dates
  - formation of Banda Black Rio
  - dissolution of Centro de Ensino Unificado de Brasília Esporte Clube
  - dissolution of Associação Atlética Rodoviária

=== January ===
- January 17: A metallurgist named Manuel Fiel Filho is found dead on the premises of DOI-CODI in São Paulo.

=== June ===
- June 24: By 221 votes in favor, the National Congress of Brazil approves the Falcão Law, which regulates electoral propaganda on radio and television.

=== July ===
- July 1: President Ernesto Geisel signs the Falcão Law, which is named after its creator Armando Falcão. The objective of the law is to prevent the strengthening of an opposition by limiting their political propaganda on television and radio.
- July 9: Fiat opens a factory in Betim, in the metropolitan region of Belo Horizonte; and begins production with the Fiat 147.

=== August ===
- August 22: Former President of Brazil, Juscelino Kubitschek, dies in an auto accident on the Presidente Dutra Highway, near Resende, Rio de Janeiro.

=== December ===
- December 16: Three leaders of the Brazilian Communist Party are killed after an ambush in the neighborhood of Lapa, São Paulo, in what was known as the Slaughter of Lapa.

== Births ==
=== January ===
- January 7:
  - Marcelo Bordon, footballer
  - Alfonso Soriano, footballer
- January 8: Alexandre Pires, singer-songwriter
- January 19: Tarso Marques, racing driver

=== March ===
- 12 March: Alexandré Pölking, footballer and manager
- 18 March: Giovanna Antonelli, actress, television host, and producer

=== April ===
- 1 April: Kim Sasabone, singer
- 4 April: Emerson, footballer

=== May ===
- May 10: Rogério Oliveira da Costa, footballer (d. 2006)
- May 23: Ricardinho, footballer and manager

=== June ===
- June 2: Antônio Rodrigo Nogueira, mixed martial artist
- June 20: Juliano Belletti, footballer
- June 26: Wilson Lima, politician and journalist
- June 27: Wagner Moura, actor

=== July ===
- July 3: Wanderlei Silva, mixed martial artist
- July 10: Edmílson, footballer
- July 17: Marcos Senna, footballer

=== August ===
- August 29: Luana Piovani, actress and model
- August 31: Roque Júnior, footballer

=== September ===
- September 6: Rodrigo Amarante, singer-songwriter
- September 10: Gustavo Kuerten, tennis player
- September 18: Ronaldo, footballer

=== October ===
- October 7: Gilberto Silva, football player
- October 10: Bob Burnquist, skateboarder
- October 24: Isabel Clark Ribeiro, snowboarder

=== December ===
- December 3: Marcos Denner, footballer
- December 5: Rafinha Bastos, comedian and television personality
- December 19: Fernanda Brum, gospel singer and pastor

== Deaths ==
=== January ===
- January 7: Luís Sérgio Person, actor and director (b. 1936)

=== May ===
- May 13: Roberto Batata, footballer (born 1949)
- May 23: Gino Meneghetti, Italian thief in Brazil (born 1888)

=== August ===
- August 22: Juscelino Kubitschek, 21st President of Brazil (1956-1961) (born 1902)

=== December ===
- December 6: João Goulart, 24th President of Brazil (1961-1964) (born 1919)

== See also ==
- 1976 in Brazilian football
- 1976 in Brazilian television
