= Meneghetti =

Meneghetti is a surname of Italian origin. Notable people with the surname include:

- Alvise Meneghetti (1691–1768), Italian art forger
- Egidio Meneghetti (1892–1961), Italian physician and pharmacologist
- Gino Meneghetti (1878–1976), Italian thief
- Ildo Meneghetti, Brazilian governor of Rio Grande do Sul
- Mario Meneghetti (1893–1942), Italian footballer
