= Grupo Rede Amazônica =

Grupo Rede Amazônica is a Brazilian conglomerate of companies headquartered in Manaus, capital of the state of Amazonas and owned by businessman Phelippe Daou Jr.. It has, as its main subsidiaries, the Rede Amazônica compound of affiliates, a regional television network affiliated to TV Globo.

== Assets ==
=== Media ===
==== Television ====
- Rede Amazônica
  - Rede Amazônica Manaus
  - Rede Amazônica Manacapuru
  - Rede Amazônica Itacoatiara
  - Rede Amazônica Parintins
  - Rede Amazônica Humaitá
  - Rede Amazônica Coari
  - Rede Amazônica Rio Branco
  - Rede Amazônica Cruzeiro do Sul
  - Rede Amazônica Macapá
  - Rede Amazônica Porto Velho
  - Rede Amazônica Cacoal
  - Rede Amazônica Ji-Paraná
  - Rede Amazônica Vilhena
  - Rede Amazônica Ariquemes
  - Rede Amazônica Boa Vista
  - Rede Amazônica Rorainópolis
- Amazon Sat

==== Radio ====
- CBN Amazônia
  - CBN Amazônia Manaus
  - CBN Amazônia Manacapuru
  - CBN Amazônia Itacoatiara
  - CBN Amazônia Belém
  - CBN Amazônia Rio Branco
  - CBN Amazônia Macapá
  - CBN Amazônia Guajará-Mirim

==== Internet ====
- G1 - Acre
- G1 - Amapá
- G1 - Amazonas
- G1 - Rondônia
- G1 - Ariquemes e Vale do Jamari (RO)
- G1 - Vilhena e Cone Sul (RO)
- G1 - Roraima
- GE - Acre
- GE - Amapá
- GE - Amazonas
- GE - Rondônia
- GE - Roraima
- Portal Amazônia

=== Other assets ===
| Iniciativa | Descrição |
|---|---|
| Alva da Amazônia Indústria Química | Related company responsible for manufacturing cleaning products located in the industrial hub of Manaus. |
| Amazonas Energia Solar | Created in 1989 to produce energy to make possible theinstallation of relay stations in the inland regions of the states served by the network. |
| Amazonas Publicidade Distribuidora | Distributes Editora Abril's publications on Manaus and Porto Velho. |
| Estúdio Amazônico de Radiodifusão | Whose trade name is Studio 5, insignia which comprises a convention center (Studio 5 Centro de Convenções) and a shopping mall (Studio 5 Festival Mall), both located in Manaus, as well as Rádio Mall which serves as support to the mall. |
| Fundação Rede Amazônica | Created on March 22, 1985, with the purpose of teaching professional training courses in the area of communication, being responsible for the management of Museu da Rede Amazônica (founded on April 18, 2002) and Rádio Fusão, a web radio station which gives support to the foundation's courses. |
| Grupo Amazônia Cabo | Manages the Amazon Sat channel, radio station CBN Amazônia and Portal Amazônia, the group's news and entertainment website, launched on July 5, 2001, covering Legal Amazon and international Amazon, aggregating information from the group's other companies. |

=== Defunct ===
- Rede Amazônica Guajará-Mirim
- Rede Amazônica Jaru
- CBN Amazônia Porto Velho
- Rádio Echos da Amazônia
