= Rede Amazônica Vilhena =

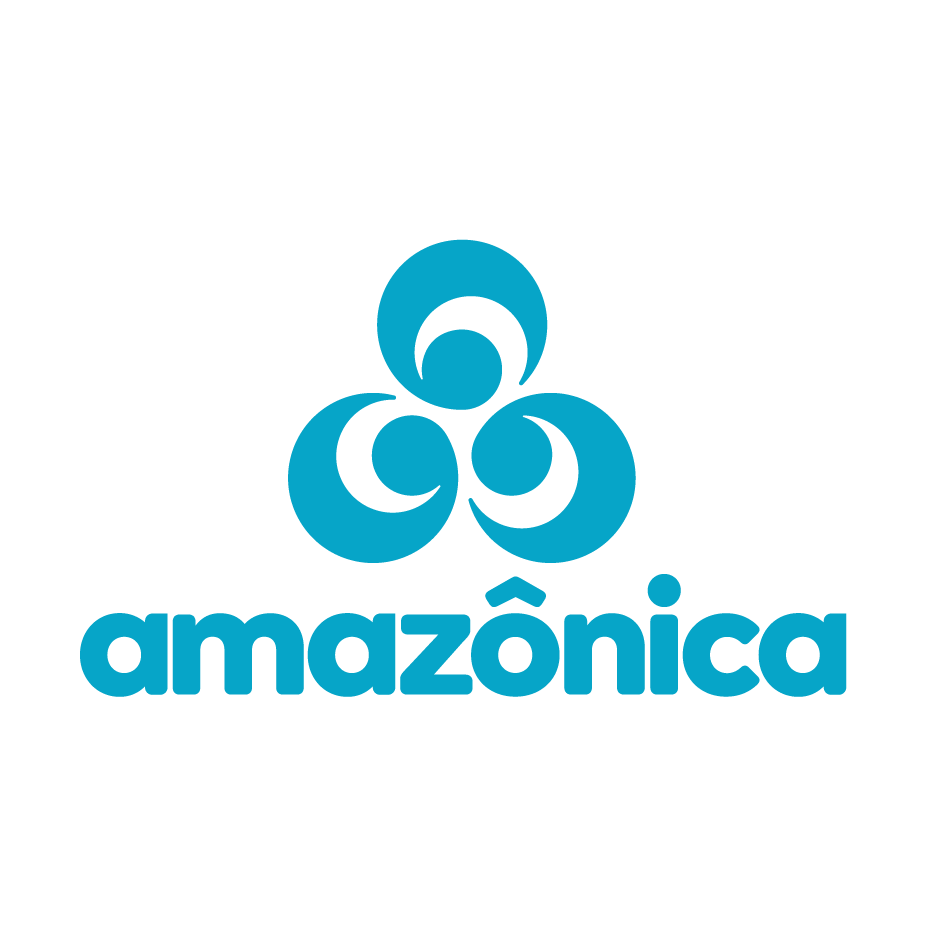

Vilhena, Rondônia; Brazil
- Channels: Analog: 5 (VHF); Digital: 15 (UHF); Virtual: 5
- Branding: Rede Amazônica

Programming
- Affiliations: TV Globo

Ownership
- Owner: Rede Amazônica (Phelippe Daou Jr.); (Rádio TV do Amazonas Ltda.)

History
- First air date: November 23, 1977
- Former names: TV Vilhena (1977-2015)
- Former affiliations: Rede Bandeirantes (1977-1986)

Technical information
- Licensing authority: ANATEL
- ERP: 1 kW
- Transmitter coordinates: 12°44′42.4″S 60°07′13.5″W

Links
- Public license information: Profile
- Website: redeglobo.globo.com/redeamazonica

Rede Amazônica Vilhena (channel 5) is a Brazilian television station based in Vilhena, a city in the state of Rondônia serving as an affiliate of TV Globo for the eastern portion of the state. The station is owned by Grupo Rede Amazônica.

== History ==
The station was founded as TV Vilhena by journalist Phelippe Daou on November 23, 1977, the same year as the founding of the city. It was the first media outlet founded in the Southern Cone of the state, arriving even before radio stations. Initially, like the other stations of Rede Amazônica's compound, it was a Rede Bandeirantes affiliate. The station aired national programming by means of video tapes sent by airplane to Vilhena, and sent to the station to its director, known as "Seu Castilho", who took his cargo bicycle to the airport to receive the footage.

In 1983, it became one of the first stations to become a Globo affiliate (the Amazonas stations only changed in 1986).

On January 3, 2015, the station abandoned the name TV Vilhena, changing its name to Rede Amazônica Vilhena.

== Technical information ==
Virtual channel	Digital channel	Aspect ratio	Content
5.1	15 UHF	1080i	Rede Amazônica VIlhena/Globo's main schedule
