= Rede Amazônica Macapá =

Rede Amazônica Macapá (ZYA 285)
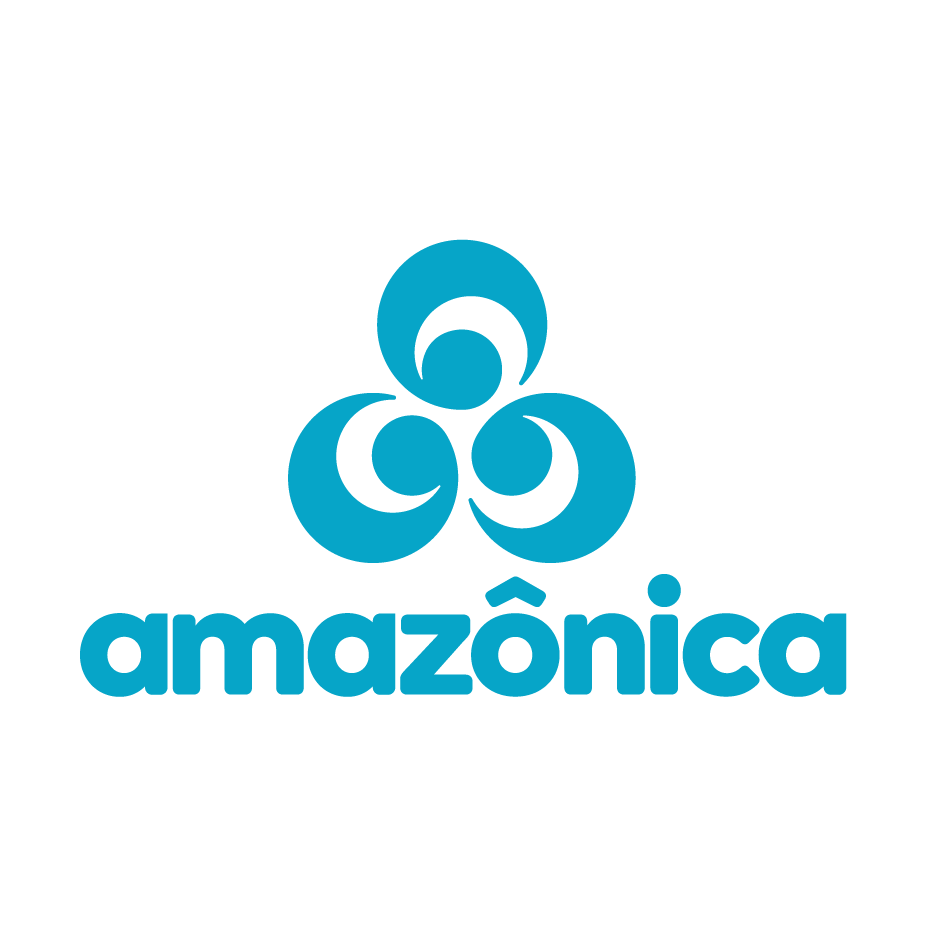

Macapá, Amapá; Brazil
- Channels: Digital: 28 (UHF); Virtual: 6
- Branding: Rede Amazônica

Programming
- Affiliations: TV Globo

Ownership
- Owner: Rede Amazônica (Phelippe Daou Jr.); (Rádio TV do Amazonas Ltda.)
- Sister stations: CBN Amazônia Macapá

History
- First air date: January 25, 1975
- Former names: TV Amapá (1975-2015)
- Former channel numbers: Analog: 6 (VHF, 1975–2018)
- Former affiliations: REI (1975); Rede Bandeirantes (1975-1982)

Technical information
- Licensing authority: ANATEL
- ERP: 4 kW
- Transmitter coordinates: 9°56′23.9″S 67°49′54.1″W

Links
- Public license information: Profile
- Website: redeglobo.globo.com/redeamazonica

Rede Amazônica Macapá is a Brazilian television station based in Macapá, capital of the state of Amapá. It operates on channel 6 (28 UHF digital) and is an affiliate of TV Globo. The station is part of Grupo Rede Amazônica, a complex of radio and television stations spread across northern Brazil (except in the states of Pará and Tocantins), founded by businessman Phelippe Daou.

== History ==
In 1974, TV Amapá was created and went on air on channel 6 by the Government of the Federal Territory of Amapá with the aim of showing all the games of the 1974 FIFA World Cup, scheduled for June of the same year, driven by the historic achievement and the height of the Brazilian team that won the previous cup. The station operated in one of the rooms of Rádio Difusora de Macapá.

With the impossibility of showing live games via EMBRATEL satellite at the time (the reason was a "hole" in satellite coverage, because the system in use at Embratel-Macapá was not suitable for this type of operation), the only broadcast option of games recorded on VT (video tape). To achieve this, Channel 6 partnered with TV Guajará in Belém.

Guajará showed the cup matches and when they finished, planes from the Government of Amapá immediately landed in Belém to receive the local VT, to be sent to Macapá to be shown on TV Amapá a few hours later. On the days when the Brazilian team played, the government plane traveled to Belém and waited there for the end of the games to bring the VT tape which, immediately upon arrival, was aired by TV Amapá. Channel 6's images alternated between color and black-and-white, which left viewers confused.

After the end of the 1974 World Cup, the broadcaster entered into an agreement with the Rede de Emissoras Independentes (led by TV Record) in São Paulo and shows the new network's programming until it goes off the air in October.

Among the pioneers of TV Amapá, maintained after 1974, stand out Corrêa Neto, Hélio Pennafort (responsible for producing the station's first documentaries), Damião Jucá (cameraman, operator, driver, illuminator and technician), Sebastião Oliveira and Humberto Moreira.

The government broadcaster was acquired by journalist Phelippe Daou, owner of Rede Amazônia de Rádio e Televisão, based in Manaus. The station's old headquarters (which operated in one of the rooms of Rádio Difusora de Macapá) is transferred to a new headquarters with a slightly larger space than the old one (on Avenida Ataíde Teive, 1282, in the Central neighborhood), where the construction of the station's headquarters takes place.

It returned to air on December 22 on an experimental basis and was reopened on January 25, 1975, by journalist Phelippe Daou and local and national authorities. It was the fifth broadcaster of the Amazon Radio and Television Network. The broadcaster maintained TV Record programming until the middle of the same year, when it left Record and started to independently show the programming of the Bandeirantes and Globo networks, which in later years later became a network.

On September 13, 1978, the TV stations TV Oiapoque (Oiapoque) and TV Cabralzinho (Amapá) were inaugurated on the same day, the first stations in the interior of the Territory.

In 1982, it was the first from Rede Amazônica to leave Rede Bandeirantes and started to fully show Rede Globo programming, remaining affiliated to this day.

In 2010, there was the stateization of the signals from the Rede Amazônica stations in their respective states, which means that each station in its state of origin sends local programming to its own municipalities (previously, stations in the interior of the states covered by the Amazon Network received programming originated by TV Amazonas, in Manaus). As a result, TV Amapá currently has a signal on the Intelsat 14 satellite at Frequency 3806 @ 3333 ksps Vertical with HDTV transmission (Coded) for this purpose, thus taking its programming to municipalities in the interior of the state.

On January 3, 2015, TV Amapá and all broadcasters in Rede Amazônica stopped using the name of their subsidiaries, starting to use only the network's nomenclature. The objective of this is to integrate all broadcasters, in order to strengthen the brand and standardize the quality of programming. With the unification of the brand, Rede Amazônica broadcasters no longer use their own names in vignettes and when promoting their programs, without however changing their name.

On October 2, 2017, the 12 pm newscast Amapá TV was renamed Jornal do Amapá 1st Edition and consequently the evening newscast became Jornal do Amapá 2nd Edition.

On September 1, 2018, new sound packages, graphics and a new visual identity debuted in the two editions of Jornal do Amapá, which now use the names JAP1 and JAP2.

On October 17, 2019, the station was added to SKY.

== Technical information ==
Virtual channel	Digital channel	Aspect ratio	Content
6.1	28 UHF	1080i	Main Rede Amazônica programming / TV Globo
