= NC TV Roraima =

- Boa Vista, Roraima; Brazil
- Channels: Digital: 36 (UHF); Virtual: 8

Programming
- Affiliations: Rede Bandeirantes

Ownership
- Owner: Grupo Norte de Comunicação; (Buritis Comunicações Ltda.)

History
- Founded: 1991
- First air date: September 12, 1991
- Former names: TV Caburaí (1991–2015); TV Bandeirantes Roraima (2015–2025)
- Former channel numbers: Analog: 8 (VHF, 1991–2018)
- Former affiliations: Record News (2008)

Technical information
- Licensing authority: ANATEL
- Transmitter coordinates: 02°50′18.1″S 60°40′02.3″W

Links
- Public license information: Profile

NC TV Roraima (channel 8) is a Brazilian television station located in Boa Vista, capital of the State of Roraima, carrying Band for the entire state. The station is part of Grupo Norte de Comunicação, owned by businessman Sérgio Bringel. It was the third station to go on air and the second oldest in Roraima, after TV Roraima. Today it only has two outsourced local programs in the Christian and news segments.

== History ==
The Ministry of Communications granted it as a Television Retransmitter (RTV), granted to the Foundation for Social and Cultural Promotion of the State of Roraima on March 14, 1990. In July of the same year, businessman Rubens de Camargo Penteado, former press officer for Jucá, registered with the commercial board the creation of TV Caburaí (a company that existed only on paper until then). Then, the future station entered into a partnership with the foundation, whose board of directors was entirely made up of friends and allies of Jucá, and began to manage the TV channel together with the foundation. On November 28, Camargo Penteado left the partnership of the television station and transferred his share to the then senator Jucá, as stated in the contractual change at the commercial board.

On September 12, 1991, TV Caburaí, affiliated to Rede Bandeirantes, went on air. The network returned to have a signal in Boa Vista nine years after TV Roraima ceased to be independent (the station broadcast cherry-picked Bandeirantes and Globo programs 1975 to 1982) to exclusively retransmit TV Globo programming.

The station went on air offering a very varied local schedule, three hours a day, including news, sports, culture, among other topics. It broadcast live the first direct election for governor in Roraima, including the counting that took two weeks. In the following years it experienced decline.

In 1996, the station was transferred to the management of a communication group, once again experiencing a good period, with new programs in almost two hours of local programming daily.

In February 2008, the station broke the retransmission agreement with Rede Bandeirantes and started retransmitting the news channel Record News, but three months later, on May 12, it returned to the old network without any warning.

Until then, since 2006, the station had no local programming produced and accepted an outsourced program that went on air on July 20th called TV Crazy, causing great controversy in the first few weeks due to the fact that it was broadcast only in the early hours of Saturday to Sunday and presented by Djota Lasyn, who was only 13 years old at the time. The TV Crazy program went off the air in November 2008 after airing a defamatory report during the festive period in Boa Vista, the city's festival. where the presenter mentioned on air to public opinion asking about how many people would die on the same night. On the day this report was aired (by mere coincidence) a young man was murdered. After what happened, the station's only program was taken off the air, but returned some time later, but this time it went off the air due to a complaint from the Ministry of Labor and guardianship council due to the minor presenting the program in the early hours of the morning and inappropriate content, ending it for good in March 2009.

In December 2010, the Superior Court of Justice decided to transfer control of TV Caburaí to the company Buritis Comunicações, owned by former Roraima state deputy Rodrigo Jucá, son of former senator Romero Jucá.

In 2015, TV Caburaí was renamed Band Roraima with its own local programming and began generating content for the network.

In 2018, the station revamped its programming and the programs Cena do Crime and Atrevida were no longer shown. Thus, Roraima Urgente is the only program on the network that premiered on April 30 and is led by the presenter of the former Cena do Crime, Bruno Perez. Presenter Emyllyn Elankynskyn from the former program Atrevida, becomes a reporter for Roraima Urgente twice a week with topics related to fashion.

On March 25, 2020, Band Roraima debuted its new newscast, Roraima Em Dia, presented by Tayla Morais.

In June 2022, Band Roraima was acquired by Grupo Norte de Comunicação. This group is responsible for SBT affiliates in the states of Amazonas and Tocantins.

== Technical information ==
Virtual channel	Digital channel	Screen	Content
8.1	36 UHF	1080i	Band Roraima/Band's main schedule

Based on the federal decree transitioning Brazilian TV stations from analogue to digital signals, Band Roraima, as well as the other broadcasters in Boa Vista, ceased broadcasting on channel 06 VHF on October 31, 2018, following the official ANATEL timeline.
