= Rede Amazônica Boa Vista =

Rede Amazônica Boa Vista (ZYA 600)
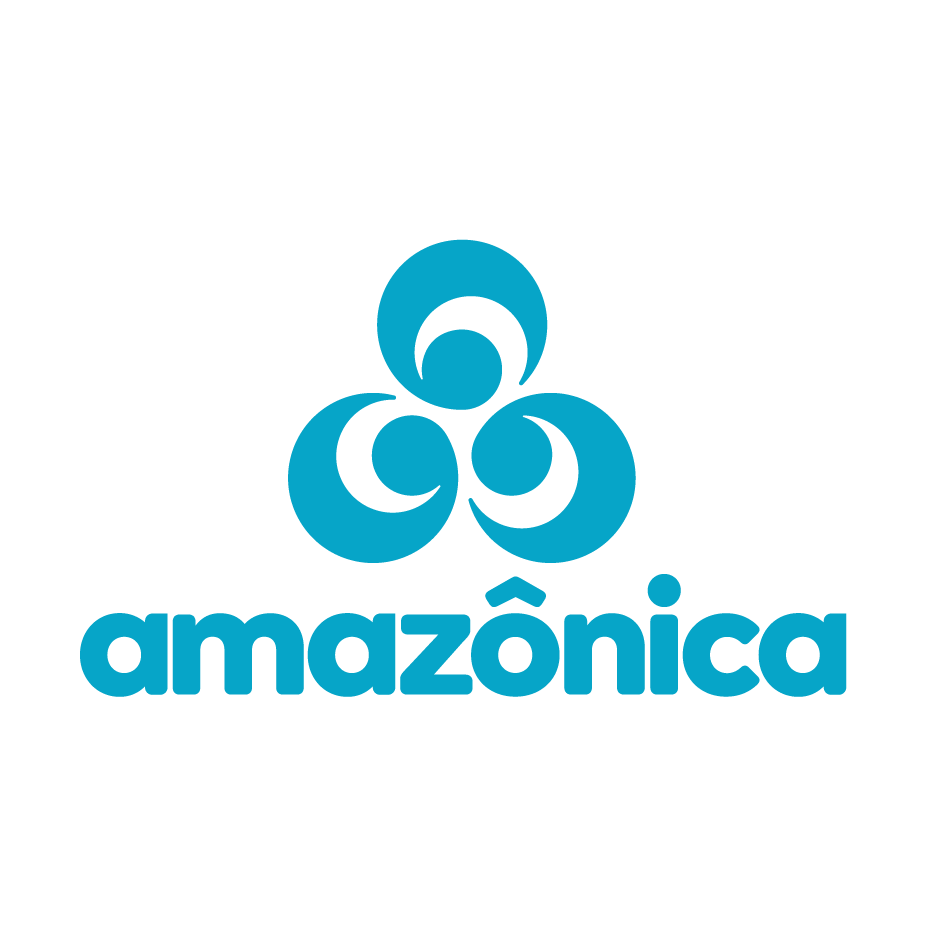
- Boa Vista, Roraima; Brazil
- Channels: Digital: 17 (UHF); Virtual: 4
- Branding: Rede Amazônica

Programming
- Affiliations: TV Globo

Ownership
- Owner: Rede Amazônica (Phelippe Daou Jr.); (Rádio TV do Amazonas Ltda.)

History
- Founded: June 14, 1974
- First air date: January 29, 1975 (Note: The station went on air on June 14, 1974, to broadcast the 1974 FIFA World Cup, but was only officially inaugurated by Rede Amazônica in 1975.)
- Former names: TV Roraima (1974-2015)
- Former channel numbers: Analog: 2 (VHF, 1974-1975); 4 (VHF, 1975–2018)
- Former affiliations: Independent (1974-1975) (Note: During the experimental broadcasts to carry the 1974 FIFA World Cup.); Rede Bandeirantes (1975-1982)

Technical information
- Licensing authority: ANATEL
- ERP: 4 kW
- Transmitter coordinates: 2°49′10.70″S 60°40′9.90″W

Links
- Public license information: Profile
- Website: redeglobo.globo.com/redeamazonica

Rede Amazônica Boa Vista (channel 4) is a Brazilian television station based in Boa Vista serving as an affiliate of TV Globo for the state of Roraima, owned-and-operated by Grupo Rede Amazônica, a company of businessman Phelippe Daou.

== History ==
The arrival of television in Roraima goes back to the eves of the 1970 FIFA World Cup, when the federal territory of Roraima was identical to the one that rocked the rest of the country, when the Brazilian Football Team was still heading towards its third football championship. At that time, telecommunications and electronics technician, Esdras Avelino Leitão, was struggling to provide family and friends with images of the World Cup final in Mexico City, which was won by Brazil.

However, since the late 1960s, some people watched television images through receivers spread across the city. At the time, electronics technician Esdras Leitão was already capturing images of the World Cup final in Mexico, in which Brazil became three-time champions. The feat was only possible due to their persistence, which, by improvising small satellite dishes, managed to capture images generated by the Costa Rican TV channel (Teletica), Venezuelan networks (RCTV Canal 2, Venevisión Canal 4, TVN Canal 5, CVTV Canal 8, all coming from Caracas) and even American network affiliates (NBC, ABC and CBS). And this was possible with a certain regularity and reasonable quality.

This technician's fight allowed, for almost four years, friends and relatives to watch television every day, with a very varied program. Most of the time, with the tracking system developed, images were only captured from other countries, almost always from Venezuela.

When he took over the Government of the Territory of Roraima, on March 12, 1970, aviator colonel Hélio Costa Campos became aware of the adventures undertaken by technician Esdras. Connected to the telecommunications area, the aviator colonel could not understand why a territory with more than 30 thousand inhabitants could not have the privilege of watching television. Hélio Campos was excited by the story. In a preliminary survey it was discovered that there were 70 television sets throughout the territory, all capturing images from foreign broadcasters.

Enthusiastic about the will of the people of Roraima, the governor made a public commitment in April that all inhabitants “would watch the opening of the 1974 FIFA World Cup, scheduled for the month of June, with images generated by a station installed in Roraima”.

The governor's determination was fundamental to the idealization of the objective. In record time (15 days) the building for the TV installations was constructed. Journalist Laucides Oliveira was assigned to monitor the station's implementation project. But the person who actually ended up supervising the project was the governor himself.

The battle to acquire equipment for the broadcaster to start operating began. At the same time, the Ministry of Communications released the signal for the Government of Roraima to begin relaying programming, with much of the equipment borrowed from TV Educativa do Maranhão and with material and programming recorded by TV Amazonas.

On June 14, 1974, at 6pm, all Roraima residents watched the official inauguration of TV Roraima Canal 2, the first in operation in Brazilian territory in the Northern Hemisphere. Once inaugurated, the first images generated by TV in Roraima were from the World Cup in West Germany. To make this possible, a war operation was mounted. As there was no equipment in the territory to capture the images, the inauguration program was recorded in Manaus (800 kilometers from Boa Vista) and a plane kindly provided by the government of Amazonas was responsible for bringing the governor and the tapes with all the information to Roraima. the recorded program. Only in this way was it possible, four hours after the end of the opening and the first game (draw between Brazil and Yugoslavia, held in the late afternoon of June 13), for the people of Roraima to watch the same images that had already been shown in almost the entire country. From the first day of operation, unlike TV stations at the time that started in black and white, TV Roraima already generated color images. And the program lasted until 10pm.

The next day, another war mission for the station to start operating took place. The problem was the lack of programming. Films, shows, among other productions, were purchased outside Roraima. Difficulties still prevented local programming. Even so, the station's director, Laucides Oliveira, decided to air local news, taking advantage of the news broadcast by Rádio Nacional. A radio studio was set up inside the TV. Presenters Célio Antunes and Benjamin Monteiro repeated on TV what they did on the radio, from the booth they read the entire half-hour newscast. Viewers listened to the news and watched images (slides) of Boa Vista. As it was not possible to capture images, the broadcaster placed slides with views of the city during the “newscast”.

As a result, regardless of the news, people from Roraima invariably watched the same images every day while the presenters read the most varied information. It was like that until the end of that year. The rest of the programming, lasting four hours a day, was made up of films, shows, news, acquired from other broadcasters in Rio de Janeiro and São Paulo.

With the broadcast of the first World Cup in color and live to Brazil, in fact to almost the entire country, the lack of satellites (they would arrive a decade later) subjected the population to videotape. Because of this, in Roraima, for example, games were watched days (sometimes weeks) after they took place. That was the time it took for the tapes with the recordings to be sent from Rio de Janeiro or Manaus on weekly flights. “A good part of the people of Roraima only believed in the Brazilian disqualification a week late, even so it was a general commotion, many were crying in front of the TV set”, stated journalist Laucides Oliveira, who at the time was director of Rádio Nacional in Roraima, first director, reporter and presenter of Roraima television.

However, four months after it opened, on September 26, the territorial government decided to transfer the broadcaster to the private sector, announced as “commercial television”. All of the station's collections were handed over to Rede Amazônica de Rádio e Televisão, headquartered in Manaus, capital of Amazonas. As a result, television only officially arrived in Roraima in September 1974. At the end of the month, the station went off the air.

In the second half of December 1974, TV Roraima went into experimental operation. The return was only for signal and sound tests to be opened next year.

On January 29, 1975, TV Roraima officially began operating, now as a commercial broadcaster and transferred from channel 2 to 4, retransmitting Rede Bandeirantes programming. All programming was in color, with the exception of local news, now with images, but in black and white.

TV Roraima was the first station in the country to use the videocassette recorder, recently launched in the United States. However, the programming continued to be recorded in Manaus and sent to Boa Vista in pouches. It was not yet possible to generate and capture images via satellite. It was only in mid-1975 that Embratel was installed in Roraima. The large bags, which took days to reach Boa Vista, were abandoned.

From its inauguration in 1974 until the end of the 1980s, TV Roraima operated alone in the state for 16 years, starting in 1974.

In 1976, local television journalism was expanded and Rede Amazônica signed a contract for the retransmission of Rede Globo in Roraima, but it remained with Bandeirantes, in practice, the broadcaster became an independent station.

In the years 1978, 1982, 1986 and 1990, which coincided with the World Cups played by Brazil, the broadcaster began to expand throughout the interior of the Federal Territory, so that the people of Roraima in all municipalities could follow the conquest of the country's fourth championship in 1994, already as a state.

In 1982, TV Roraima stopped retransmitting the programming of both networks, when it left Bandeirantes and began to exclusively retransmit all of Rede Globo's programming. It became the first affiliate of Rede Amazônica to join the Rio de Janeiro network. In the same year, TV Acre, TV Amapá and TV Rondônia started to retransmit Globo's programming.

In 1985, the slots for local programming expanded, previously only 15 minutes were allocated to local production. Gradually this space grew. Today it is already more than two hours, with two thirds of this slot being occupied by Rede Amazônica to broadcast local news.

In 1986, the last station of Rede Amazônica, TV Amazonas, became affiliated with Globo.

Until 1990, the station operated alone in the Federal Territory until the end of President José Sarney's government (1985–1990) and the beginning of President Fernando Collor de Mello's government (1990–1992). During the Sarney government, hundreds of concessions were granted for the exploitation of radio broadcasting signals distributed throughout the country. In the case of Roraima, four concessions were released.

With the entry of TV Macuxi (affiliated with TVE Brasil, today TV Brasil) on channel 2 (which was occupied by TV Roraima during its experimental phase), in March of the same year, the monopoly as the only broadcaster in the state ended.

In September, the third channel, TV Caburaí (affiliated with Rede Bandeirantes - today Band Roraima) came into operation on channel 8, after eight years without a signal when it was retransmitted together with Globo on TV Roraima.

On October 5, 1991, the first anniversary of Roraima's transformation from Territory to State, TV Boa Vista (affiliated with Rede Manchete, now RedeTV!) went on air on channel 12.

On October 11 of the same year, the fifth television channel in Roraima, TV Tropical (affiliated to SBT) on channel 10, began operating on an experimental basis.

On an uncertain date and month, at the end of 1991, the sixth and last television channel in Roraima, TV Imperial (affiliated with Rede Record) went on air on channel 6.

In the years that followed, other channels went on air: Amazon Sat (1997), TV Maracá (2001, in 2007 changed to TV Cidade), TV Ativa (2003, affiliated with TV Cultura), repeater of Rede Boas Novas (2003, current Boas Novas). Despite the new channels, TV Roraima consolidated its leadership with Rede Globo.

In 2010, there was the stateization of the signals from the Rede Amazônica stations in their respective states, which means that each station in its state of origin sends local programming to its own municipalities (previously, stations in the interior of the states covered by the Amazon Network received programming originated by TV Amazonas, in Manaus). With this, TV Roraima gained its own satellite signal on Intelsat 14 for this purpose.

On April 26, 2012, the broadcaster inaugurated its digital signal in HDTV for the city of Boa Vista and delivered its completely renovated headquarters and debuted new scenarios for its news programs, following the model of Jornal do Amazonas and other TV news programs on Rede Globo, the in order to get closer to the viewer.

On March 22, 2013, the station gained a page to publish its news articles on Portal G1, from Organizações Globo.

On January 3, 2015, TV Roraima and all broadcasters of Rede Amazônica stopped using the name of their subsidiaries, starting to use only the network's nomenclature. The objective of this is to integrate all broadcasters, in order to strengthen the brand and standardize the quality of programming. With the unification of the brand, Rede Amazônica broadcasters no longer use their own names in vignettes and when promoting their programs, without however changing their name.

On October 2, 2017, the broadcaster made changes to its journalism. The lunchtime newspaper Roraima TV is now called Jornal de Roraima 1st Edition and the evening newspaper in turn becomes Jornal de Roraima 2nd Edition.

On September 1, 2018, the broadcaster debuts new graphic and sound packages and a new visual identity in the two editions of Jornal de Roraima, which now go by the names JRR1 and JRR2.

Since October 17, 2019, its signal has been available on the SKY operator, together with the stations in Macapá, Porto Velho and Rio Branco.

== Technical information ==
Virtual channel	Digital channel	Aspect ratio	Content
4.1	17 UHF	1080i	Rede Amazônica Rio Branco/Globo's main schedule

Based on the federal decree transitioning Brazilian TV stations from analog to digital signals, Rede Amazônica Boa Vista, as well as the other stations in Boa Vista, ceased its transmissions via VHF channel 4 on October 31, 2018, following the official ANATEL schedule.
