= Rede Amazônica Cacoal =

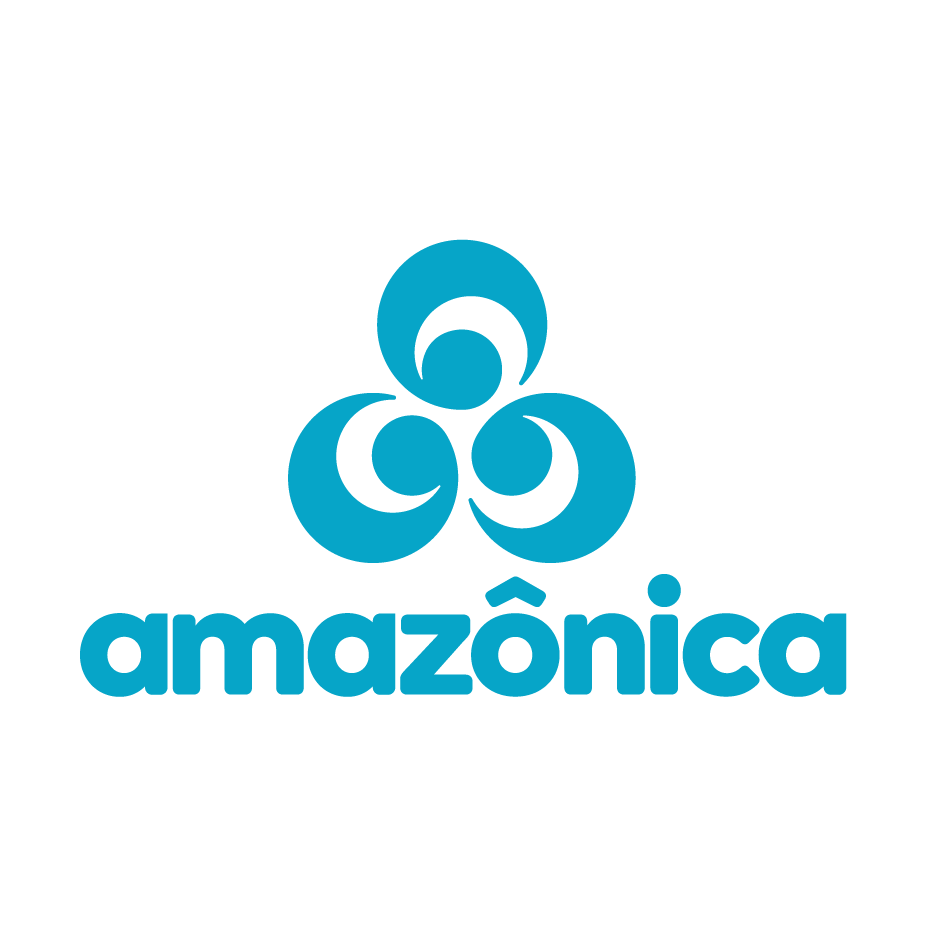

Cacoal, Rondônia; Brazil
- Channels: Digital: 21 (UHF); Virtual: 5
- Branding: Rede Amazônica

Programming
- Affiliations: TV Globo

Ownership
- Owner: Rede Amazônica (Phelippe Daou Jr.); (Rádio TV do Amazonas Ltda.)

History
- First air date: October 13, 1981
- Former names: TV Cacoal (1981-2015)
- Former channel numbers: Analog: 5 (VHF, 1981-2023)
- Former affiliations: Rede Bandeirantes (1981-1986)

Technical information
- Licensing authority: ANATEL
- ERP: 1 kW
- Transmitter coordinates: 11°25′42.9″S 61°27′27.1″W

Links
- Public license information: Profile
- Website: redeglobo.globo.com/redeamazonica

Rede Amazônica Vilhena (channel 5) is a Brazilian television station based in Cacoal, a city in the state of Rondônia, serving as an affiliate of TV Globo for the western part of the state. The station is owned-and-operated by Grupo Rede Amazônica.

== History ==
The station was launched as TV Cacoal on October 13, 1981, by journalist Phelippe Daou. Initially, like the other stations of Rede Amazônica's compound, it was a Rede Bandeirantes affiliate.

On January 24, 1983, the station joined TV Globo.

In 2012, G1 Cacoal e Zona da Mata started. On January 3, 2015, the station abandoned the name TV Cacoal, changing its name to Rede Amazônica Cacoal.

On September 10, 2018, Rede Amazônica Cacoal started producing the local edition of Jornal de Rondônia 2ª Edição. The edition was produced until 2019.

On May 15, 2023, after four years, Rede Amazônica Cacoal started producing local news again, with the return of the local edition of Jornal de Rondônia 2ª Edição. The program, however, instead of being produced in Cacoal, is produced from the main Rede Amazônica studios in Manaus.

== Technical information ==
Virtual channel	Digital channel	Aspect ratio	Content
5.1	21 UHF	1080i	Main Rede Amazônica Cacoal programming/TV Globo

The station shuttered its analog signal on December 15, 2023 per a decision by ANATEL.
