= Rede Amazônica Ariquemes =

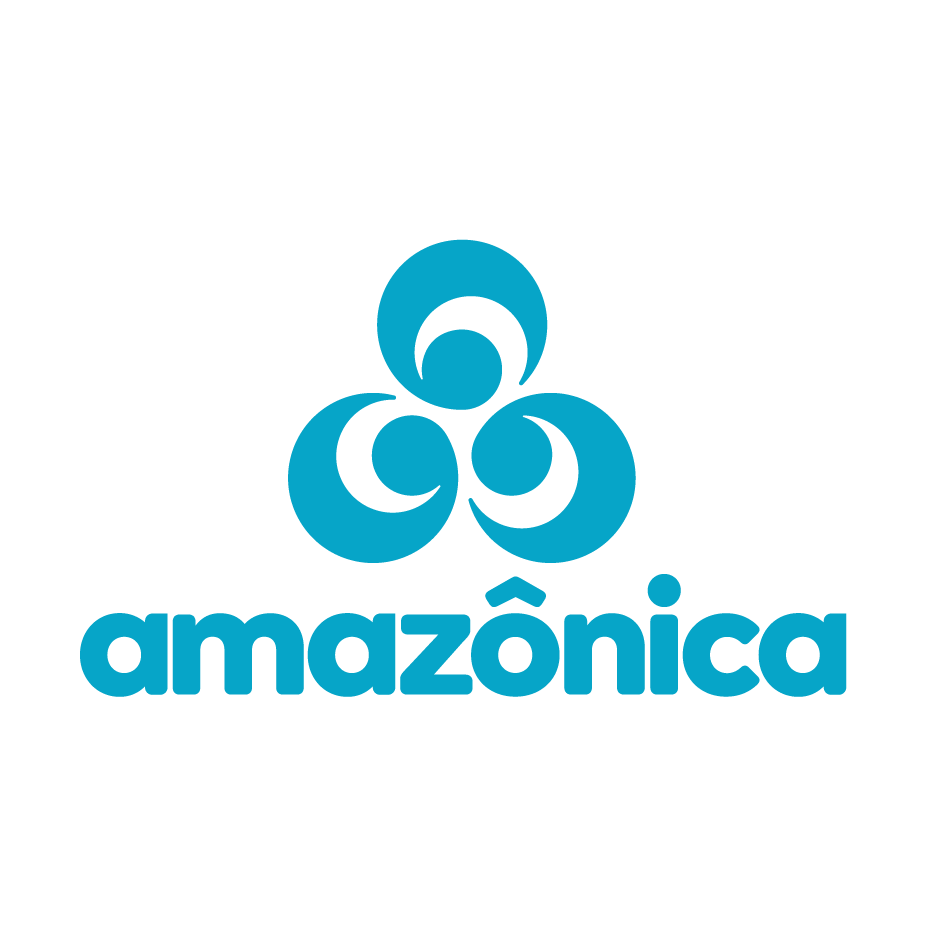

Ariquemes, Rondônia; Brazil
- Channels: Analog: 7 (VHF); Digital: 14 (UHF); Virtual: 7
- Branding: Rede Amazônica

Programming
- Affiliations: TV Globo

Ownership
- Owner: Rede Amazônica (Phelippe Daou Jr.); (Rádio TV do Amazonas Ltda.)

History
- First air date: December 26, 1979
- Former names: TV Ariquemes (1979-2015)
- Former affiliations: Rede Bandeirantes (1979-1983)

Technical information
- Licensing authority: ANATEL
- ERP: 1 kW
- Transmitter coordinates: 9°55′21.4″S 63°02′14.8″W

Links
- Public license information: Profile
- Website: redeglobo.globo.com/redeamazonica

Rede Amazônica Ariquemes (channel 7) is a Brazilian television station based in Ariquemes, a city in the state of Rondônia, serving as an affiliate of TV Globo for most of the state. The station is owned-and-operated by Grupo Rede Amazônica and is part of the Rede Amazônica network.

== History ==
The station was founded by TV Ariquemes by journalist Phelippe Daou on December 26, 1979, being the first television station to sign on in the city. Initially, like the other stations of the network, it was a Rede Bandeirantes affiliate.

In 1983, following the example of the other stations of the network (except TV Amazonas), TV Ariquemes left Rede Bandeirantes and joined Rede Globo.

On January 3, 2015, the station abandoned the former TV Ariquemes nomenclature, becoming Rede Amazônica Ariquemes.

From September 19, 2016, Rede Amazônica Ariquemes started producing entire local editions of Jornal de Rondônia. On the same day, the station introduced a new news set.

== Technical information ==
| Virtual channel | Digital channel | Screen | Content |
|---|---|---|---|
| 7.1 | 14 UHF | 1080i | Rede Amazônica Ariquemes/Globo's main schedule |

As TV Ariquemes, its digital broadcasts started on UHF channel 14, on May 22, 2014, sbecoming the first inland television station in Rondônia to do so.
