= Rede Gazeta =

Brazilian television network

- Type: Broadcast television network
- Country: Brazil
- Availability: Espírito Santo
- Founded: September 11, 1976
- Launch date: September 11, 1976
- Affiliation: TV Globo (1976-)

Rede Gazeta is a Brazilian television network owned by Rede Gazeta de Comunicações and affiliated with TV Globo. It owns four television stations covering all 78 cities of Espírito Santo, being TV Gazeta Vitória the flagship station of the network.

== History ==
Rede Globo de Televisão's programming arrived in Espírito Santo well before its affiliate established itself in Espírito Santo. As already described, in 1966, a group of politicians and businessmen created TV Clube Intermunicipal, the embryo of the creation of TV Gazeta, 10 years later, in 1976. The 60s and 70s were marked by changes in the political-economic axis of Espírito Santo and national. With an agrarian tradition (in a State that was beginning its migration to factory-export production) and linked to political activities (in a time of dictatorship), the Monteiro Lindenberg family started to invest to make crossings in the fields of power.

With the growth of the TV audience, mainly around Globo, included in the national project to establish a mass communication system in Brazil, the Monteiro Lindenberg family sees TV as a place for investment and action, reinforcing its presence in the media business, since the clan already owned the newspaper A Gazeta since the 1940s, acquired in the context of political-party disputes. Based on negotiations, disputes and conversations that date back to the early 1970s, the Monteiro Lindenberg family obtained the Globo retransmission contract and the concession of a channel, inaugurating TV Gazeta on September 11, 1976. In its beginnings, TV Gazeta hired experienced professionals in the area from other States of the Federation. It also promoted training for journalists and technicians with the TV Globo team, in Rio de Janeiro. The Social Communication course at the Federal University of Espírito Santo (Ufes), with a qualification in Journalism and Advertising, was only created in 1975.

TV Gazeta obtained concessions in all regions of Espírito Santo (TV Gazeta Sul, based in Cachoeiro de Itapemirim; TV Gazeta Norte, in Linhares; and TV Gazeta Noroeste, in Colatina), always as a Globo retransmitter. These channels maintain local programming, reproducing content from Globo and TV Gazeta de Vitória.

In September 2021, the general director of Rede Gazeta, Café Lindenberg, became part of the network's presidency and board. In his place, as general director, collaborator Marcello Moraes takes over.

== Stations ==
| Station | Channel | City |
|---|---|---|
| TV Gazeta Vitória | 4 (22 UHF) | Vitória |
| TV Gazeta Noroeste | 9 (24 UHF) | Colatina |
| TV Gazeta Norte | 5 (23 UHF) | Linhares |
| TV Gazeta Sul | 10 (21 UHF) | Cachoeiro de Itapemirim |
