= Rede Amazônica Itacoatiara =

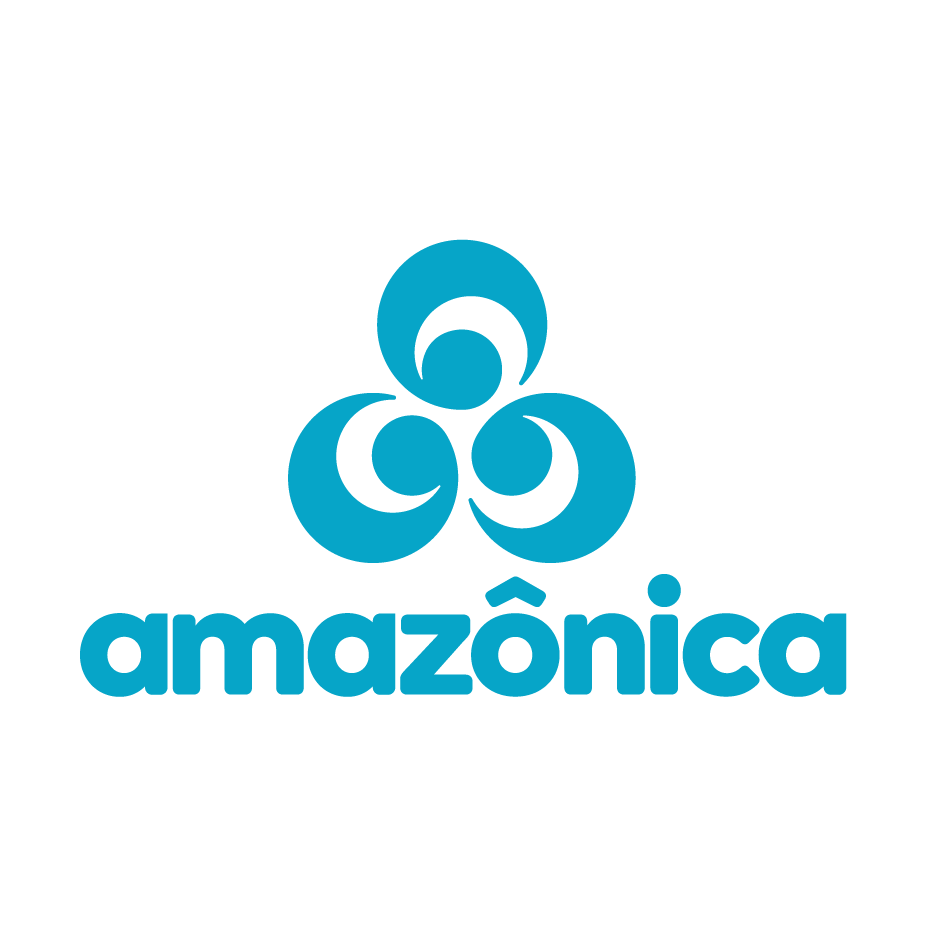

Itacoatiara, Amazonas; Brazil
- Channels: Analog: 11; Digital: 16 (UHF); Virtual: 11
- Branding: Rede Amazônica

Programming
- Affiliations: TV Globo

Ownership
- Owner: Rede Amazônica (Phelippe Daou Jr.); (Rádio TV do Amazonas Ltda.)

History
- Founded: December 1976
- First air date: December 1976
- Former names: TV Itacoatiara (1976-2015)
- Former affiliations: Rede Bandeirantes (1976-1986)

Technical information
- Licensing authority: ANATEL
- ERP: 0.25 kW
- Transmitter coordinates: 3°08′06.8″S 58°26′45.5″W

Links
- Public license information: Profile
- Website: redeglobo.globo.com/redeamazonica

Rede Amazônica Itacoatiara is a Brazilian television station based in Itacoatiara, a city in the state of Amazonas. It operates on analog VHF channel 11 and digital UHF channel 11 (virtual 11.1), and is an affiliate of TV Globo. The station is owned by Grupo Rede Amazônica.

== History ==
The station was opened as TV Itacoatiara by journalist Phelippe Daou in December 1976, becoming the first TV station in the city and the second in the interior of Amazonas. Initially, the station was affiliated with Rede Bandeirantes, and showed its programming through U-matic tapes brought from Manaus, generated by TV Amazonas. In 1986, with the affiliation of TV Amazonas to Rede Globo in Manaus, TV Itacoatiara also left Rede Bandeirantes to affiliate with the Rio network.

On January 3, 2015, the broadcaster abandoned the name TV Itacoatiara, changing its name to Rede Amazônica Itacoatiara. On August 19, 2016, at the meeting held by the Regional Electoral Court of Amazonas to define the electoral time for the 2016 municipal elections, Rede Amazônica Itacoatiara claimed a technical inability to show the programs of candidates for mayor of the city. On August 26, judge Abraham Peixoto Campos Filho granted a request for an injunction to the broadcaster, which therefore did not show that year's election schedule.

On June 15, 2018, after almost 42 years (until then, the station's local programming consisted of local bulletins under the Amazonas Notícia name), the station debuted its first local news program, generating locally the last segment of Jornal do Amazonas 2nd Edition, with a presentation by Manoel Cruz, reporter for the Itacoatiarense broadcaster since 2007. To implement local television journalism, the broadcaster's headquarters were restructured and expanded.

On July 30, 2019, Rede Amazônica Itacoatiara aired for the last time the local block of Jornal do Amazonas 2nd Edition produced in Itacoatiara, which was being presented by Lucas Wilame. In 2020, the broadcaster began showing a regional block focused on the Middle and Lower Amazonas regions, generated in Manaus, and also aired by Rede Amazônica Parintins.

On November 2, 2021, at 9:22 pm, Rede Amazônica Itacoatiara had transmission system cables stolen, remaining off-air until the following day, when these cables were reinstalled. The theft also took down the Amazon Sat retransmitter in the city.

== Technical information ==
Virtual channel	Digital channel	Aspect ratio	Content
11.1	16 UHF	1080i	Rede Amazônica Itacoatiara/Globo's main schedule
