= Rede Amazônica Ji-Paraná =

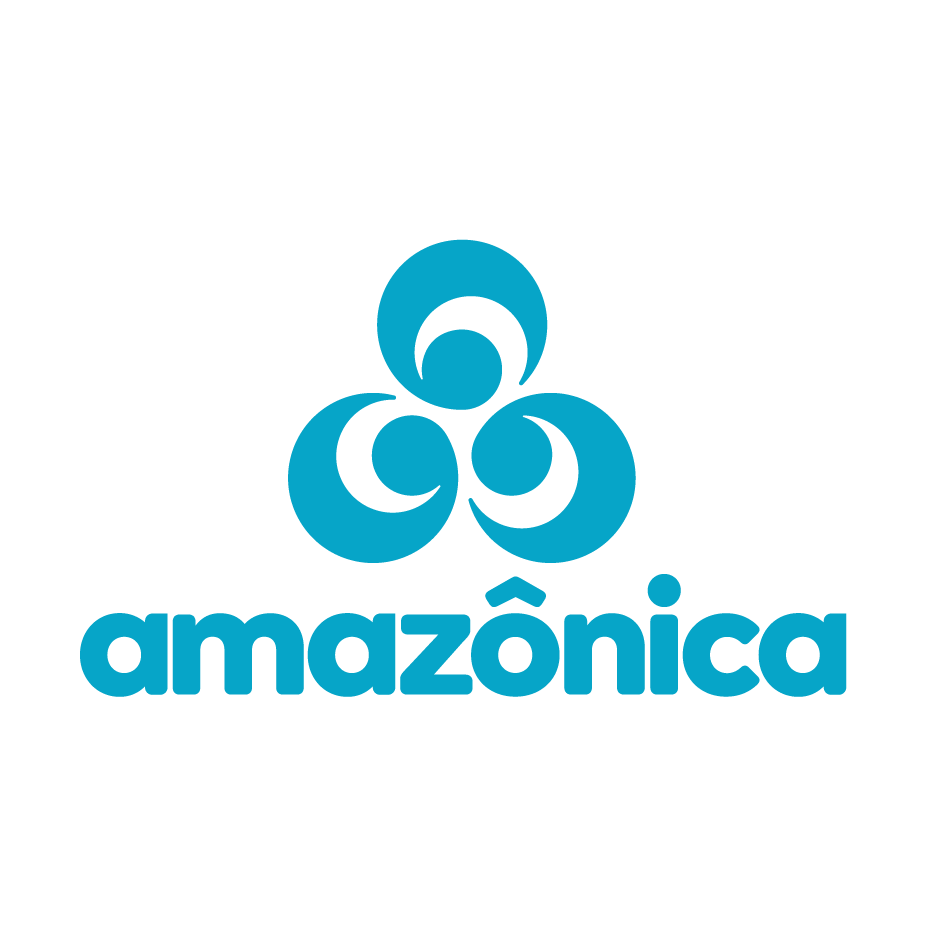

Ji-Paraná, Rondônia; Brazil
- Channels: Analog: 5; Digital: 15 (UHF); Virtual: 5
- Branding: Rede Amazônica

Programming
- Affiliations: TV Globo

Ownership
- Owner: Rede Amazônica (Phelippe Daou Jr.); (Rádio TV do Amazonas Ltda.)

History
- First air date: September 13, 1976
- Former names: TV Ji-Paraná (1976-2015)
- Former affiliations: Rede Bandeirantes (1976-1986)

Technical information
- Licensing authority: ANATEL
- ERP: 0.25 kW (analog); 0.3 kW (analog)

Links
- Public license information: Profile
- Website: redeglobo.globo.com/redeamazonica

Rede Amazônica Ji-Paraná is a Brazilian television station based in Ji-Paraná, a city in the state of Rondônia. It operates on analog VHF channel 5 and digital UHF channel 15 (virtual 5.1), and is an affiliate of TV Globo. The station is owned by Grupo Rede Amazônica.

== History ==
The station was opened as TV Ji-Paraná by journalist Phelippe Daou, on September 13, 1976, having received the transmission equipment five days earlier. In its early days, the station had no local advertising, showing only music videos and public service announcements during program breaks. Initially, like the other television stations on Rede Amazônica, it was affiliated with Rede Bandeirantes.

In 1983, following the network's other stations (with the exception of TV Amazonas), TV Ji-Paraná left Rede Bandeirantes and became affiliated with Rede Globo.

On January 3, 2015, following the pattern of the other Rede Amazônica stations, TV Ji-Paraná became known as Rede Amazônica Ji-Paraná.

== Technical information ==
Virtual channel	Digital channel	Aspect ratio	Content
5.1	15 UHF	1080i	Rede Amazônica Ji-Paraná/Globo's main schedule
