= Alvise Meneghetti =

Alvise Meneghetti (19 August 1691 – 1768) was a Venetian jeweller, antiques dealer and art forger.

Meneghetti was born into a prominent Venetian family on 19 August 1691. He started out working with gemstones and graduated to engraving metal. He had a reputation for antiquarianism. In 1733, he became court jeweller in the Duchy of Parma and gained access to the ducal art collection.

Meneghetti's chelandia medal that took in many naval historians

In 1750, Meneghetti returned to Venice and set up an antiques shop, displaying both authentic pieces and his own imitations, which he falsely presented as authentic. One of his clients was the English consul Joseph Smith. He died in 1768, leaving his business to his brother Giovanni, his nephew Bonaventura and his great nephew Giovanni. In 1827, Leonardo Manin was highly critical of Meneghetti's relatives for continuing to produce and pass off fakes.

Meneghetti's forgeries include cameos, coins and medals, both imitations and inventions. They are not, however, of the highest quality and are easily detected. Nevertheless, one of his fakes had an important influence on scholarship. This is a false medal depicting a chelandia and attributed to a Doge Pietro (usually assumed to be Pietro II Candiano), a sketch of which was published by Auguste Jal in 1840. Reproductions and derivations of this sketch, and conclusions drawn therefrom, were produced as late as 1995, four years after the original forgery had been rediscovered in the Archaeological Museum in Zagreb and published along with 64 other forged medals. The forged chelandia medal had been detected as such by the engineer Giovanni Casoni in 1847, but he himself was taken in another medal that purported to date the construction of the Venetian Arsenal to 1104.

== Works cited ==
- Gorini, Giovanni; Mirnik, Ivan; Chino, Elisabetta (1991). "I falsi del Meneghetti". Bolletino del Museo Civico di Padova. 80: 321–357.
- Müller, Reinhold C. (2004). "Venetian Ships and Shipbuilders Before the Millennium: Jal's Chelandia or the Fortunes of a Fake". Publications de l'École Française de Rome. 325 (Le technicien dans la cité en Europe occidentale, 1250–1650): 61–76.
- Pryor, John H.; Jeffreys, Elizabeth M. (2006). The Age of the Δρομων: The Byzantine Navy, ca 500–1204. Brill.
