= Rede Amazônica Rio Branco =

Rede Amazônica Rio Branco (ZYA 200)
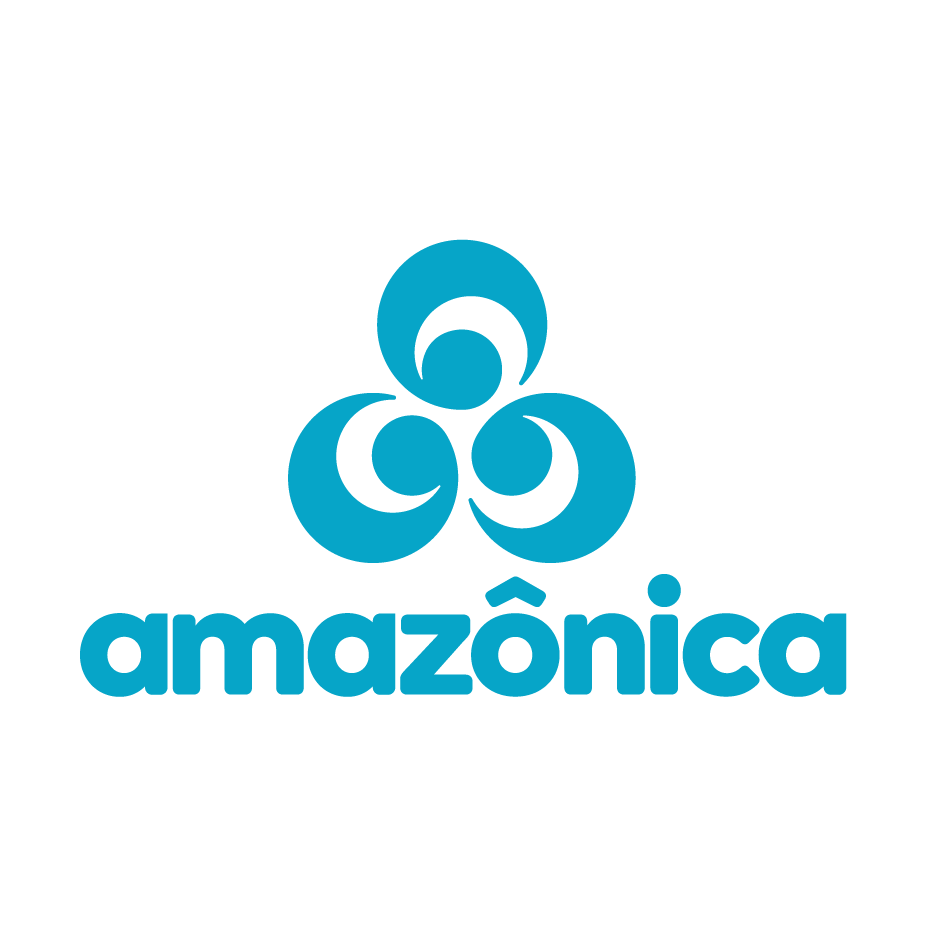

Rio Branco, Acre; Brazil
- Channels: Digital: 14 (UHF); Virtual: 4
- Branding: Rede Amazônica

Programming
- Affiliations: TV Globo

Ownership
- Owner: Rede Amazônica (Phelippe Daou Jr.); (Rádio TV do Amazonas Ltda.)
- Sister stations: CBN Amazônia Rio Branco

History
- First air date: October 16, 1974
- Former names: TV Acre (1974-2015)
- Former channel numbers: Analog: 4 (VHF, 1974–2018)
- Former affiliations: Independent (1974-1975); Rede Bandeirantes (1975-1982)

Technical information
- Licensing authority: ANATEL
- ERP: 4 kW
- Transmitter coordinates: 9°56′23.9″S 67°49′54.1″W

Links
- Public license information: Profile
- Website: redeglobo.globo.com/redeamazonica

Rede Amazônica Rio Branco (channel 4, formerly known as TV Acre) is a Brazilian television station based in Rio Branco, capital of the state of Acre serving as an affiliate of TV Globo. Alongside CBN Amazônica Rio Branco, the station is owned by Grupo Rede Amazônica, a complex of radio and television stations spread across several northern Brazilian states, founded by businessman Phelippe Daou.

== History ==
A concession for a television station in the state of Acre was granted through Notice no. 018/73, published in the Official Gazette on the 17th of August 1973.

Before the official inauguration, the station installed its transmitters at Palácio do Bispo along with television sets to show the 1970 World Cup matches with a four-year delay, won by Brazil at the time. These broadcasts were made using a small transmitter with a power that did not exceed 100 watts.

On October 16, 1974, journalist and publicist Phelippe Daou opened the first television station in the state of Acre, which had never had television stations before. Tufic Assmar, a businessman of Lebanese descent who was already working in the commercial sector, was invited to be director of the station.

The station's first hire was journalist Pedro Paulo Menezes Campos Pereira, who, in addition to being a news anchor, presented the sports program A Bola é Nossa. Natal de Brito and Martir Rocha were also hired and would later take over respectively Jornal do Acre, the station's main news program, and A Bola é Nossa, respectively.

The broadcaster signed an affiliation contract with Rede Bandeirantes to air its programs. The broadcast was always on a one-day delay, as it depended on Bandeirantes' own tapes to be shown, and also affected the network's news programs. This practice continued until 1978, with the installation of the tracking antenna. This resulted in the station showing games from the 1978 World Cup held in Argentina live. Because of such advances, the station's daily schedule had increased to eighteen hours.

Several relayers were installed in several cities in the interior to expand coverage, in Cruzeiro do Sul, Tarauacá and Brasiléia.

The station joined Globo in 1982 and aired its programming 2 hours late in relation to Brasília, considering the local timezone. The new affiliation bought a more diversified schedule, a more comprehensive news program and emphasis on its telenovelas.

In 2010, Rede Amazônica regionalized the signals of each of the stations in their respective states, no longer relying on TV Amazonas in Manaus for its programming.

On October 17, 2019, the station was added to SKY.

== Technical information ==
Virtual channel	Digital channel	Aspect ratio	Content
4.1	14 UHF	1080i	Main Rede Amazônica programming / TV Globo

The station began its digital transmissions on July 26, 2012, through UHF channel 14. The launch ceremony of the station's digital signal was led by Bishop Máximo Lombardi, and was attended by the president of Rede Amazônica, Phelippe Daou, the governor of Acre, Tião Viana, as well as representatives from Rede Globo and ABERT.

Based on the federal decree transitioning Brazilian TV stations from analog to digital signals, Rede Amazônica Rio Branco, as well as the other stations in Rio Branco, ceased its transmissions via VHF channel 4 on October 31, 2018, following the official ANATEL schedule.
