= Gino Meneghetti =

Gino Amleto Meneghetti
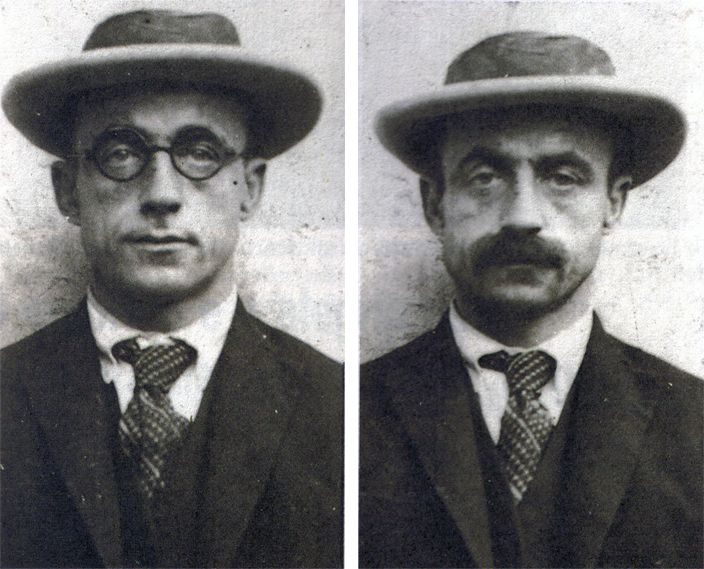
- Meneghetti when he was arrested by police in São Paulo in June 1926
- Born: Amleto Giotto Sabindo Forestal Menichetti; 1 July 1888; Vicopisano, Italy
- Died: 23 May 1976 (aged 96); São Paulo, Brazil
- Other names: Mario Mazza, Antonio Garcia, Angelo Bianchi, Amleto Gino, Gino Amleto Detto, Menotti Menichetti, Italo Bianchi
- Occupations: Mechanic, locksmith, bricklayer, and burglar
- Spouse: Concetta Tovani
- Children: Spartaco Meneghetti and Lenin Meneghetti
- Parent(s): Angelo Menichetti & Laudemia Taccola
- Status: Deceased
- Criminal charges: Murder, attempted murder, and theft
- Penalty: Numerous jail sentences

Gino Meneghetti (Italian pronunciation: [ˈdʒiːno meneˈɡetti]; born Amleto Giotto Sabindo Forestal Menichetti, 1 July 1888 – 23 May 1976) was an Italian thief who spent much of his criminal career in Brazil.

In the Brazilian film Dov'è Meneghetti, Luiz Ramalho stars as Meneghetti, focussing on his robberies.

== Early life ==
Gino Amleto Meneghetti was originally born as Amleto Giotto Sabindo Forestal Menichetti in village of Lugnano, outskirts of Vicopisano, in the Italian region of Tuscany (his father was abroad at that time). He was the son of Arcangiolo "Angelo" Menichetti and Maria Laudomia Taccola. The family lived in Lugnano, five miles from Pisa, where the father got a new job in a ceramics factory. Gino went to live with other boys of similar age, who together practised petty theft, including fruit, chickens and objects of little value. At the age of 11 Gino was caught thieving, the first of many times that he was arrested over the next few years.

In an attempt to reform, Meneghetti went back to school to learn the skills of a mechanic and locksmith. Using his savings he moves to Marseille to live with an uncle. He did not last long before being arrested again, this time for the illegal possession of weapons. He was sentenced to a short time in prison until, at the age of 20, he was deported back to Italy.

Meneghetti was called to military service but, in a desperate attempt to avoid his fate, he feigned mental instability. Upon examination by psychiatrist Eugenio Tanzi he is diagnosed as suffering from alienation. He spent the years between 1905 and 1910 in a series of Italian asylums, considered by medical authorities a "moral lunatic" and having an "unsound mind".

== Arrival in Brazil ==
Having been arrested several times Meneghetti decided to seek his fortunes elsewhere, emigrating to Brazil, where he had relatives. He arrived at the Port of Santos on 25 June 1913 aboard the Italian ship Italian "Tomaso di Savoia". His criminal history preceded him and a dossier from the Italian police was sent to Brazilian authorities described him as "a dangerous, convicted criminal" who had committed crimes "against property and violence against law enforcement officials". The document also said that in 1912 he was sentenced to 18 months in prison for attempted sexual violence.

He started work as a bricklayer but lost his job shortly after a fight with the master-builder. He quickly returned to a life of crime with his first theft being at an imported weapons storage facility. The Brazilian police caught Meneghetti on 31 March 1914 and he was sentenced to eight years. However, while in solitary confinement he managed to escape. He travelled around the country, visiting Curitiba, Porto Alegre, and Florianópolis, before going to Montevideo (Uruguay) and Buenos Aires (Argentina). During this time he adopted a variety of aliases, including as Mario Mazza, Antonio Garcia, Angelo Bianchi, Amleto Gino, Gino Amleto Detto, Menotti Menichetti and Italo Bianchi.

During a visit to Juiz de Fora he steals money and jewellery of extremely high value, only to be tracked to Rio de Janeiro and once again arrested. Soon after he escaped and moved to Bixiga with his wife and two children.

He continued to rob shops and residential houses, breaking into safes and stealing jewellery. The tactic was always the same: Meneghetti acted alone, and was never more than five minutes in each residence. Because he only stole from the richest people and never hurt anybody he became a mythological figure to a news starved media. This put pressure on the police and Meneghetti was soon a major target.
