= Rede Amazônica Porto Velho =

Rede Amazônica Itacoatiara (ZYP 264)
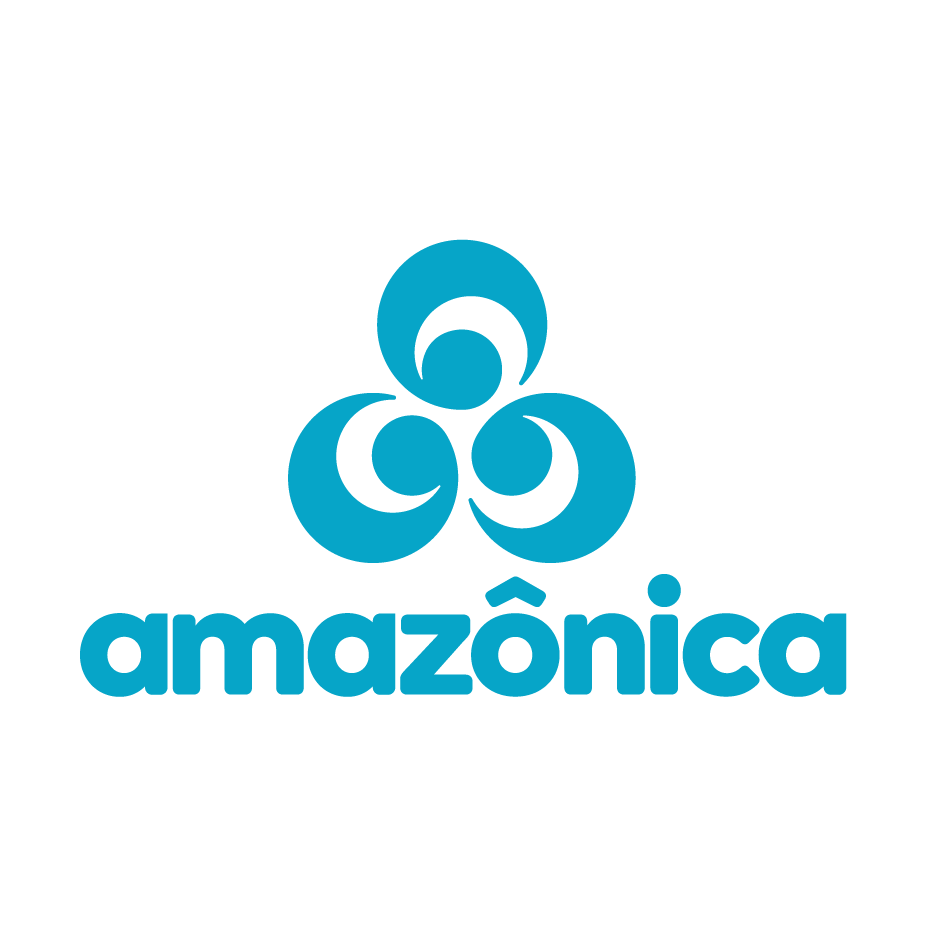

Porto Velho, Rondônia; Brazil
- Channels: Digital: 14 (UHF); Virtual: 4
- Branding: Rede Amazônica

Programming
- Affiliations: TV Globo

Ownership
- Owner: Rede Amazônica (Phelippe Daou Jr.); (Rádio TV do Amazonas Ltda.)

History
- First air date: September 13, 1974
- Former call signs: ZYB 590 (1974-2018)
- Former names: TV Rondônia (1974-2015)
- Former channel numbers: Analog: 4 (VHF, 1974-2018)
- Former affiliations: Rede Bandeirantes (1974-1986)

Technical information
- Licensing authority: ANATEL
- ERP: 4 kW
- Transmitter coordinates: 8°45′51.7″S 63°53′30.0″W

Links
- Public license information: Profile
- Website: redeglobo.globo.com/redeamazonica

Rede Amazônica Porto Velho (channel 4) is a Brazilian television station based in Porto Velho, capital of the state of Rondônia, serving as an affiliate of TV Globo for most of the state, including the capital area. The station is part of Grupo Rede Amazônica, a complex of radio and television stations spread across northern Brazil (except in the states of Pará and Tocantins), founded by businessman Phelippe Daou.

== History ==
It was founded on September 13, 1974, by journalist Phelippe Daou, owner of Rede Amazônica, which has its headquarters in Manaus, AM. Since its foundation, TV Rondônia has had decisive financial support from the Government of Rondônia and the City of Porto Velho for its maintenance as an important vehicle of information and entertainment for the population of the capital of Rondônia. The installation of the station, both in the capital and in other municipalities in Rondônia, was only made possible as a result of contracts signed between Rede Amazônica and the Executive Branch, which allowed the businessman to quickly consolidate and expand his communication project for the region. TV Rondônia was not the first station in the state, the short-lived TV Cultura held that title.

In 2010, there was the stateization of the signals from Rede Amazônica stations in their respective states, which means that each broadcaster in its state of origin sends local programming to its own municipalities (previously broadcasters from the interior of the states covered by the Rede Amazônica received programming originated by TV Amazonas, in Manaus). With this, TV Rondônia gained a signal on the StarOne C3 satellite at frequency 4193 Mhz, Symbol Rate: 4762, in Vertical polarization in HDTV transmission (Coded) for exclusive use by its transmitters in the interior of the state of Rondônia.

On June 1, 2012, the station gained a page to publish its journalistic articles on Portal G1, from Organizações Globo.

On July 21, 2012, the digital HDTV signal was officially launched for the city of Porto Velho. On the same date, the broadcaster reopens its building (which underwent renovations during the digital signal implementation period) and debuts new scenarios for its news programs, gaining the same format as Jornal do Amazonas and other Rede Globo news programs, in order to get closer to your viewers.

On January 3, 2015, TV Rondônia and all stations of the Rede Amazônica stop using the name of their subsidiaries, starting to use only the network's nomenclature. The objective of this is to integrate all broadcasters, in order to strengthen the brand and standardize the quality of programming. With the unification of the brand, Rede Amazônica stations no longer use their own names in branding and when promoting their programs, without however changing their name.

On November 26, lightning struck the station's headquarters in Porto Velho, taking its signal off the air for around 40 minutes. As the lightning damaged several equipment, local programming and the generation of commercials were hampered, and the station returned to the air retransmitting the signal from TV Amazonas, the network head of Rede Amazônica in Manaus, Amazonas. Jornal de Rondônia ended up being cancelled, and Jornal do Amazonas was shown in its place. During the early hours of the morning, the broadcaster managed to resolve the problems and restarted its local transmission the following day.

On October 17, 2019, the station was added to SKY.

== Technical information ==
Virtual channel	Digital channel	Aspect ratio	Content
4.1	14 UHF	1080i	Rede Amazônica Porto Velho/Globo's main schedule
