= Rede Amazônica Parintins =

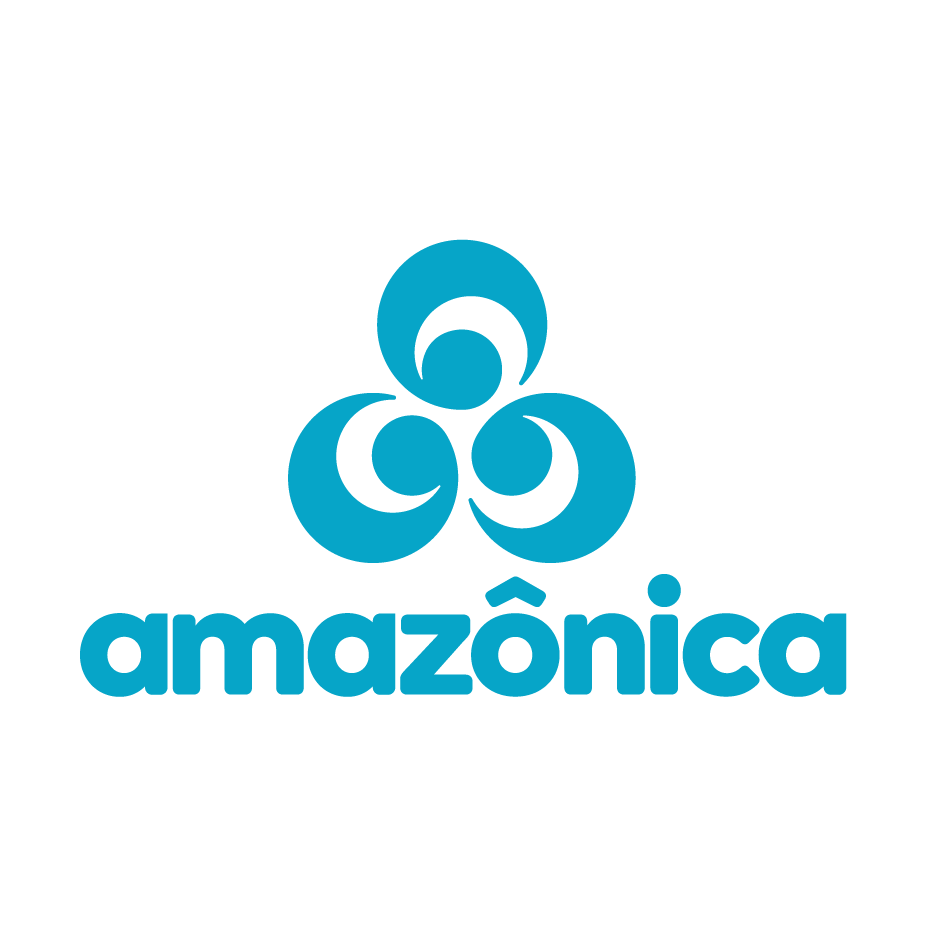

Parintins, Amazonas; Brazil
- Channels: Analog: 7 (VHF); Digital: 15 (UHF); Virtual: 7
- Branding: Rede Amazônica

Programming
- Affiliations: TV Globo

Ownership
- Owner: Rede Amazônica (Phelippe Daou Jr.); (Rádio TV do Amazonas Ltda.)

History
- First air date: September 5, 1976
- Former names: TV Parintins (1976-2015)
- Former affiliations: Rede Bandeirantes (1976-1986)

Technical information
- Licensing authority: ANATEL
- ERP: 0.25 kW (analog); 0.3 kW (analog)

Links
- Public license information: Profile
- Website: redeglobo.globo.com/redeamazonica

Rede Amazônica Parintins (channel 7; is a Brazilian television station based in Humaitá, Amazonas serving as an affiliate of TV Globo for the western part of the state, owned-and-operated by Grupo Rede Amazônica.

== History ==
The station was opened on September 5, 1976, by journalist Phelippe Daou as TV Parintins, integrating the Amazon Network and being the first in the interior of Amazonas. At its foundation, it was affiliated with Rede Bandeirantes, as well as TV Amazonas. Also like the Manaus station, it left Bandeirantes in 1986 to join Rede Globo.

At the end of the 90s, TV Parintins stopped producing the local block of Jornal do Amazonas. The station's local production was restricted to the Repórter Parintins bulletins, which were 2 to 3 minutes long. The bulletin stopped being produced in 2007, and TV Parintins began to retransmit TV Amazonas in its entirety, generating only commercial breaks.

On January 3, 2015, following the pattern of the other Rede Amazônica stations, TV Parintins became known as Rede Amazônica Parintins. On the afternoon of June 13, 2018, an electrical discharge resulting from a storm damaged transmission equipment and took the station off the air. Rede Amazônica Parintins only returned to the air on the evening of the following day, after the arrival of technicians from Manaus.

On August 7, 2018, two months after investing in local television journalism at Rede Amazônica Itacoatiara, Rede Amazônica Parintins once again had a local block of Jornal do Amazonas 2nd Edition. The block continued being shown until July 2019. In 2020, the broadcaster started showing a regional block focused on the Middle and Lower Amazonas regions, generated in Manaus, and also shared by Rede Amazônica Itacoatiara.

== Technical information ==
Virtual channel	Digital channel	Aspect ratio	Content
7.1	15 UHF	1080i	Rede Amazônica Parintins/Globo programming
