= Rede Amazônica Manaus =

Rede Amazônica Manaus (ZYA 247)
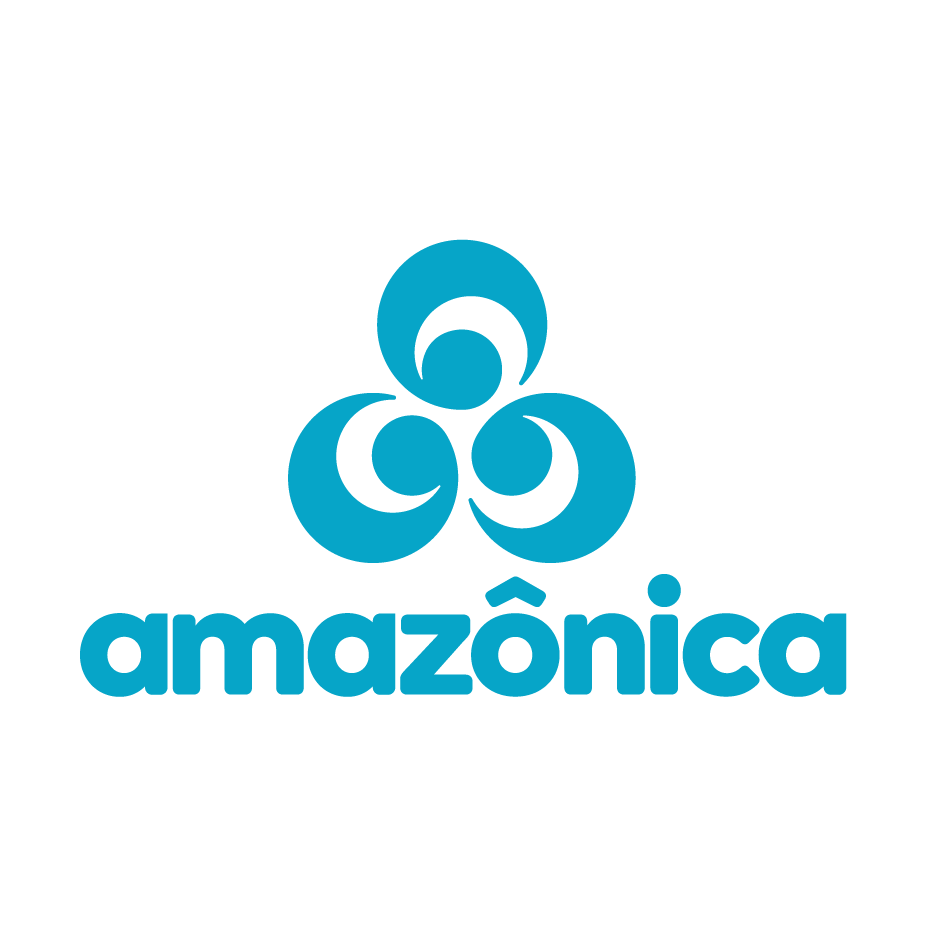
- Manaus, Amazonas; Brazil
- Channels: Digital: 15 (UHF); Virtual: 5
- Branding: Rede Amazônica

Programming
- Affiliations: TV Globo

Ownership
- Owner: Rede Amazônica (Phelippe Daou Jr.); (Rádio TV do Amazonas Ltda.)
- Sister stations: CBN Amazônia Manaus; Rádio Echos da Amazônia

History
- Founded: August 10, 1972
- First air date: September 1, 1972
- Former names: TV Amazonas (1972-2015)
- Former channel numbers: Analog: 5 (VHF, 1972–2018)
- Former affiliations: Independent (1972-1975); Rede Bandeirantes (1975-1982)

Technical information
- Licensing authority: ANATEL
- ERP: 10 kW
- Transmitter coordinates: 3°5′50.3″S 59°59′36.9″W

Links
- Public license information: Profile
- Website: redeglobo.globo.com/redeamazonica

Rede Amazônica Manaus (channel 5) is a Brazilian television station based in Manaus, capital of the state of Amazonas serving as an affiliate of TV Globo for the capital area and most of the state. The station is the flagship broadcasting property of locally-based Grupo Rede Amazônica, a group of radio and television stations spread across several northern Brazilian states, founded by businessman Phelippe Daou, alongside radio station CBN Amazônia Manaus and Rádio Echos da Amazônia.

== History ==
In 1968, journalists and businessmen Phelippe Daou, Milton Magalhães de Cordeiro, and Joaquim Margarido founded Amazonas Publicidade (today Amazonas Distribuidora), with the aim of establishing a media conglomerate in Amazonas. In the same year, businesspeople received news that the Ministry of Communications would open a public tender to establish a television station in the city of Manaus. At this time, TV Ajuricaba existed, and TV Baré and TVE Amazonas were in the implementation phase.

In July 1969, after examining the competition notice in detail, businessmen Phelippe, Milton and Joaquim decided to compete for the bid for channel 5 VHF. In 1970, Amazonas Publicidade won the bid, having a period of two years to start its operations. The first step towards the implementation of TV Amazonas was taken there.

The station's first studios operated at Avenida Carvalho Leal, 1270, in the Cachoeirinha neighborhood, which today houses the Fundação Rede Amazônica, since 2003. The transmission park was built at Estrada do Aleixo (current Avenida André Araújo), 1555, in the Aleixo neighborhood, where the station's headquarters are today. On August 10, 1972, the station's signal was aired for the first time, in an experimental phase.

TV Amazonas was inaugurated at 6 pm on September 1, 1972, being the fourth TV station to be founded in the state of Amazonas, after TV Baré (earlier in 1972), TVE Amazonas (1971) and TV Ajuricaba (1969, replacing the cabled TV Manauara founded in 1966). At 7 pm, the first program to be presented by the station went on air, Jornal do Amazonas, presented by journalist Paulo José.

During its first three years of operation, TV Amazonas was not affiliated with any television network, unlike its competitors TV Ajuricaba (which retransmitted part of REI and Rede Globo's programming) and TV Baré (Rede Tupi's O&O). As a result, it began using tapes from REI and TV Cultura, as well as canned imports from Fox and Columbia Pictures' catalogs to compose its programming.

Still in 1972, the Ministry of Communications signed a partnership with TV Amazonas to implement a series of repeaters in the states of Acre and Rondônia. In 1975, TV Acre and TV Rondônia were created, and in the same year, TV Amapá and TV Roraima were acquired from the governments of these respective states. Thus, Rede Amazônica was born, the largest complex of television stations in northern Brazil, and the largest in the country in terms of coverage.

In 1975, Grupo Bandeirantes de Comunicação decided to convert TV Bandeirantes São Paulo into a new national television network. This is how Rede Bandeirantes was created, which soon gained several affiliates across the country, including TV Amazonas. As the station did not yet have a satellite signal, the network's programming was sent to Manaus in bags by plane, which generated a delay of 2 to 3 days in relation to the original broadcast of the programs. The same occurred with TV Rondônia and TV Acre, which also received TV Amazonas programming late, as it also had no satellite signal.

This problem only ended in 1979, and with that, TV Amazonas started showing the network's programming without any delay, and also stopped sending tapes to TV Rondônia and TV Acre, which also started to capture the Band signal on the satellite. TV Amapá and TV Roraima stopped showing REI's programming and joined other broadcasters to transmit the Band's signal, thus unifying the affiliation of Rede Amazônica.

In the same year, TV Amazonas began an expansion process in the state of Amazonas, implementing repeaters in several municipalities in the state, some of them in partnership with local city halls. Since there were many spaces provided by the Band to productions by its affiliates, TV Amazonas premiered several local programs, some of them notorious such as Teledisco, presented by Beto de Paula, the talk-show Encontro com o Povo, and the Consuelo Nunes Program, about the feminine universe.

On July 1, 1986, with the end of Rede Globo's affiliation contract with TV Ajuricaba, TV Amazonas left Rede Bandeirantes and became its new affiliate, thus unifying Rede Amazônica's programming, as network heads in other states had already broadcast the network's programming since 1983. With the new affiliation, the broadcaster had to extinguish several of its local programs to adapt to the "Globo Quality Standard". Significant changes occurred, mainly in the journalism sector, which would now become the flagship of programming.

In 1988, Amazonas Distribuidora launched Amazon Sat, which was responsible for transmitting the Amazonas TV signal to the other broadcasters of the Amazon Network. With the inauguration of the signal, Rede Amazônica stations began to retransmit all programming generated in Manaus, in addition to filling Rede Globo's commercial breaks with advertisements generated for the entire north of Brazil. The Amazon Sat signal could also be captured via satellite by any satellite dish throughout the country, until 2004. This year, TV Amazonas disintegrated its Amazon Sat programming, starting to have an exclusive satellite signal. In this way, the channel began to generate programming independent of Rede Amazônica. However, due to a requirement from Globo, Amazonas Distribuidora encoded the Amazon Sat signal, restricting it only to the coverage area of the Amazon Network, and no longer to the entire country.

In 2009, Amazônia TV began to be generated by each of the Rede Amazônica broadcasters. As a result, TV Amazonas started to generate news only for the state of Amazonas, while the other broadcasters started to generate news for their respective coverage area.

During 2010, Rede Amazônica regionalized the signals of each of the stations in their respective states. From then on, TV Amazonas (generator of Rede Amazônica) stopped generating programming for the states covered by the broadcaster. Therefore, the other four local generators now have their own signal on the satellite and generate their own local programming.

On October 3, 2011, TV Amazonas began making local versions of the G1 portal and globoesporte.com available, with the aim of disseminating news from the region and publishing videos of news reports. In addition, Rede Amazônica gained space on Rede Globo's website, to promote local programming. Even with the creation of the new website, the Amazon Portal was still used.

On March 16, 2012, TV Amazonas launched its new logo, in celebration of the broadcaster's 40th anniversary. On September 1, the date on which it completed 40 years on air, several flash mobs were organized in various parts of the city, such as Studio 5, Terminal 5 and Orla da Ponta Negra. In these flash mobs, several graffiti artists created panels with impressions of the station, in addition to dance groups performing.

On November 29, TV Amazonas created the "Milton Cordeiro Journalism Award", named in honor of the broadcaster's journalism director, Milton de Magalhães Cordeiro. The competition has the categories: Journalism, Print, Radio journalism, Telejournalism and Web journalism, in which only journalists from the states of Acre, Amapá, Amazonas, Rondônia and Roraima can compete.

On October 4, former TV Verdes Mares journalist, Luana Borba, returned to be part of the TV Amazonas journalism team after two years as anchor of Bom Dia Ceará on the Ceará broadcaster. Back in Manaus, Luana will present the Amazonian edition of Bom Dia Amazônia.

On January 3, 2015, TV Amazonas and all other stations in the Rede Amazônica network stopped using the name of their subsidiaries, starting to use only the network's nomenclature. The goal was to integrate all stations, in order to strengthen the brand and standardize the quality of programming. With the unification of the brand, the station was renamed Rede Amazônica Manaus. On January 31, Amazônia Repórter leaves the station's schedule.

On April 25, with the reformulation of Rede Globo's schedule on Saturdays, Rede Amazônica debuted new programming on weekends. The Zappeando program gained a new season, and Paneiro also debuted, which showcases the region's musical rhythms.

In 2016, the first generation of owners of the station and Rede Amazônica died. On October 5, Joaquim Margarido died of cancer. On the 30th of the same month, Milton Magalhães de Cordeiro died, a victim of pneumonia. And on December 14, the group's then president and last remaining member, Phelippe Daou, died of multiple organ failures.

On July 3, 2017, the broadcaster began generating the first 30 minutes of Bom Dia Amazônia on a regional network, with the remaining 60 minutes generated only for its coverage area in Amazonas. On September 30, the broadcaster stops showing Amazonas TV at lunchtime, which is replaced by Jornal do Amazonas 1st edition. The broadcaster also stops showing Amazônia em Revista, which is eliminated from programming.

On September 1, 2018, the day the station turned 46, the news program Bom Dia Sábado premiered, presented by Larissa Santiago and broadcast across the five states covered by Rede Amazônica. On the same day, the visual identity of Jornal do Amazonas was also reformulated.

== Technical information ==
Virtual channel	Digital channel	Aspect ratio	Content
5.1	15 UHF	1080i	Rede Amazônica Manaus/Globo's main schedule
