= Betina Anton =

Brazilian journalist and writer (born 1979)

- Born: 1979 (age 46–47); São Paulo, SP, Brazil
- Citizenship: Brazilian
- Education: School of Communications and Arts, University of São Paulo
- Occupations: Journalist; Writer
- Years active: 2001–present
- Employer: TV Globo
- Notable work: Baviera Tropical (2023)
- Awards: Vladimir Herzog Award (2019, video); 66th Jabuti Prize (2024, Biography and Reporting); APCA Award (2023, Biography)

Betina Anton (born 1979) is a Brazilian journalist and writer. She is the author of the book Baviera Tropical, published by Todavia, which won the 66th Jabuti Award in the biography and reporting category.

== Biography ==
=== Early years and education ===
Of German descent, Betina was born in 1979 in the city of São Paulo, the state capital. She completed her early education in the city, attending the German school, Colégio Humboldt São Paulo, located in the Interlagos neighborhood. She later earned a degree in journalism from the School of Communications and Arts, University of São Paulo (ECA-USP) in 2001. She moved to London, England, to study at the London School of Economics (LSE), where she earned a master’s degree in international history.

She worked as a reporter for InvestNews, the news agency of the Gazeta Mercantil newspaper. Since 2001, she has been with TV Globo, where she has worked for the cable news channel GloboNews and the local newscasts SPTV and Antena Paulista. She currently works in the international news department at GloboNews.

Betina drew on her childhood experiences to write the book Baviera Tropical, published by Todavia in 2023. In 1985, when she was six years old, her teacher, Liselotte Bossert, was removed from her classroom; the teacher’s absence sparked curiosity and unease about why she had been removed from the classroom. The teacher was removed for having harbored the Nazi doctor Josef Mengele, who lived in the city of São Paulo from 1961 until 1979, when he died after drowning at Enseada Beach in Bertioga. The sudden removal of her teacher, Liselotte Bossert, from the classroom was directly linked to the revelation that she and her husband, Wolfram Bossert, had maintained a close, friendly relationship with Josef Mengele. The couple sheltered the Nazi criminal for years in São Paulo, and after his death in 1979, Liselotte was responsible for arranging his burial at the Embu das Artes cemetery. She arranged for the body to be buried under the false name of Wolfgang Gerhard, the identity Mengele was using at the time to hide in Brazil. Liselotte Bossert’s connection to Josef Mengele led to her dismissal from the school in 1985, following the revelation that she had harbored the Nazi and arranged his fake burial. This generated significant public attention within the school community and in the press.

== Prizes ==
In 2019, she was awarded the Vladimir Herzog Award in the video category for her series of reports, “70 Years of the Universal Declaration of Human Rights: Achievements and Failures” which aired on TV Globo.

In 2024, his book Baviera Tropical, published by Todavia, won the 66th Jabuti Award in the biography and journalism category. The previous year, the book also won the São Paulo Art Critics Association (APCA) prize in the biography category.

== Bibliography ==
- Baviera Tropical. São Paulo, Todavia, 2023, ISBN 978-6556925509.
