= TV Diário (Mogi das Cruzes) =

TV Diário (ZYB 901)
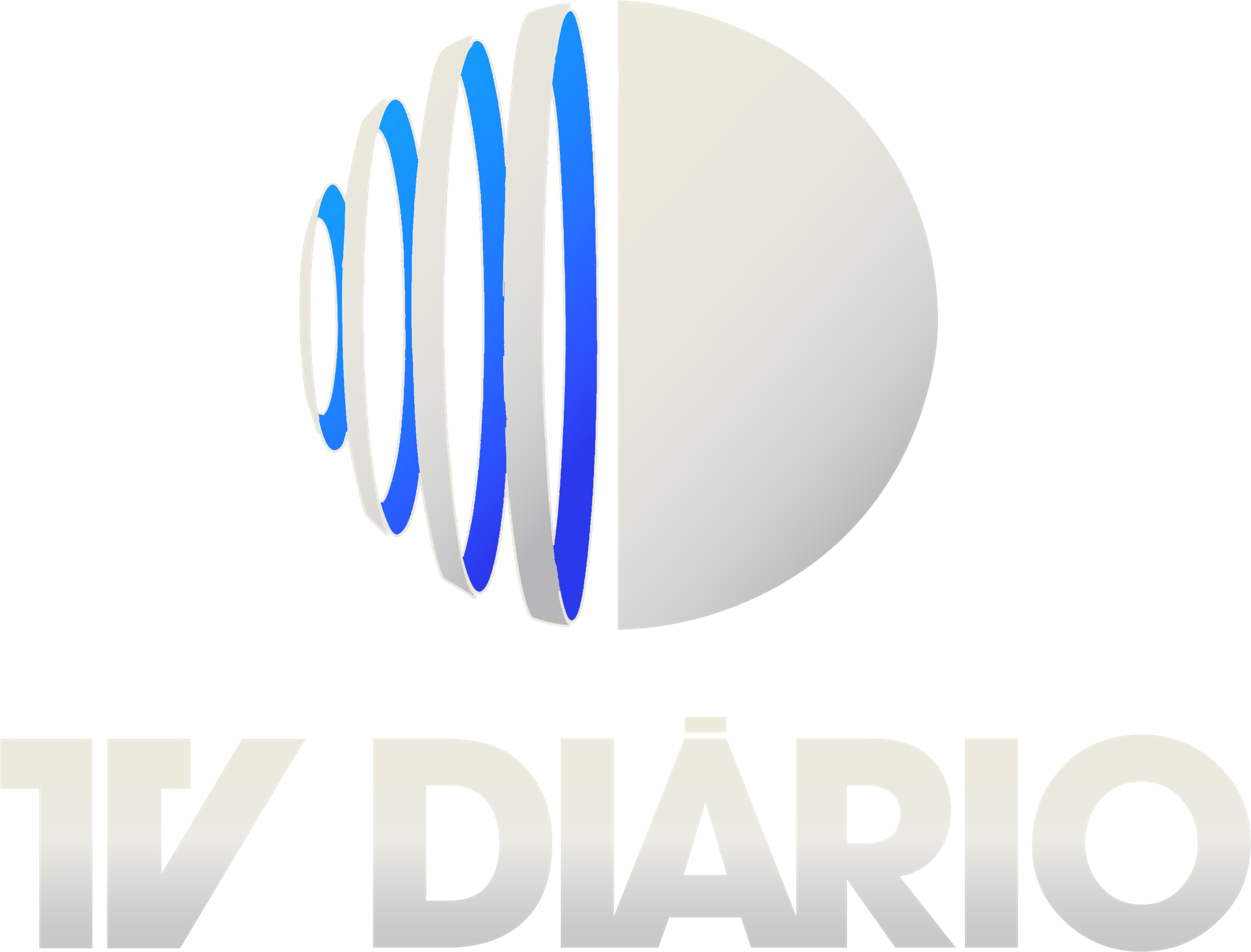
- Mogi das Cruzes, São Paulo; Brazil
- Channels: Digital: 19 (UHF); Virtual: 19
- Branding: TV Diário

Programming
- Affiliations: TV Globo

Ownership
- Owner: Grupo Diário de Mogi; (Rádio e Televisão Diário de Mogi Ltda.)

History
- First air date: May 1, 2000
- Former channel numbers: Analog: 14 (UHF, 2000); 38 (UHF, 2000-2017); Digital: 52 (UHF, 2010-2018)

Technical information
- Licensing authority: ANATEL
- ERP: 0.9 kW
- Transmitter coordinates: 23°28′55.7″S 46°12′3.6″W

Links
- Public license information: Profile
- Website: redeglobo.globo.com/sp/tvdiario

TV Diário (channel 19) is a Brazilian television station based in Mogi das Cruzes, a city in the state of São Paulo, serving as an affiliate of TV Globo for the Alto Tietê Region. It is owned by locally based Grupo Diário de Mogi, also responsible for the newspaper O Diário de Mogi, a company of the San Biagio family as its sole broadcasting property and its coverage covers 10 municipalities in the São Paulo metropolitan region. Its studios are located in the César de Sousa district and its transmission antenna is at the top of the Serra do Itapeti.

== History ==
The owners of the newspaper O Diário de Mogi won the concession granted by the Ministry of Communications. The station's concession followed the new rules of minimum hours for local programming established in the bidding notices, and had a greater number of local/regional programs than the other Rede Globo affiliates in the state of São Paulo, and even the affiliates spread throughout Brazil.

The station went on air on May 1, 2000, through UHF channel 14 (later in the same year moving to channel 38), replacing the Rede Globo São Paulo retransmitters in the Alto Tietê region. At the time, the population was 1.2 million inhabitants, concentrated in cities such as Suzano (where a unit with a studio and a permanent journalism team was set up), Itaquaquecetuba, Ferraz de Vasconcelos and Poá. There are 1.6 million potential viewers, 539 thousand households with TV and a CPI of 0.824%.

On May 15, 2008, exactly 15 days after the station's 8th anniversary, reporter Edson Ferraz suffered a gunshot attack on the street in the Rodeio neighborhood, in the César de Sousa district, in Mogi das Cruzes. The reporter was returning alone from the capital of São Paulo when a car surrounded the broadcaster's vehicle and fired two shots at the professional, who escaped without injury. The police's suspicion is that the attack is a reprisal for the report that Edson Ferraz made for SPTV in the Capital, about the complaint that the State Public Prosecutor's Office made against 13 investigators from Garra de Mogi das Cruzes, suspected of involvement in a bribery scheme of illegal businesses such as car dismantling, gambling houses and prostitution in the city and in Suzano.

In 2013, the station's branch was opened in the city of Suzano. With its own commercial and journalism team, as well as a studio for presenting local newspapers, TV Diário's presence in the city and throughout the region was further intensified.

== Technical information ==
Virtual channel	Digital channel	Screen	Content
19.1	19 UHF	1080i	Main TV Diário programming/Globo

TV Diário started its digital broadcasts in 2010, through physical channel 52. On June 4, 2018, per a decision taken by ANATEL, its physical channel moved to channel 19. The station's local programs converted to widescreen on March 14, 2022, marking this the last Globo station in overall to switch to that format for its local programs as when the station launched its HDTV signal in 2010, only network programming was shown in widescreen.

=== Analog-to-digital conversion ===
Based on the federal decree transitioning Brazilian TV stations from analog to digital signals, TV Diário ceased broadcasting on UHF channel 38 on March 29, 2017, the same day as the end of analog television in the São Paulo metropolitan area, following the official ANATEL roadmap.

== Programs ==
Besides relaying TV Globo's national programming, currently TV Diário produces and airs the following programs:

- Bom Dia Diário: Morning news, with William Tanida;
- Diário TV 1.ª edição: News, with Mirielly de Castro;
- Diário TV 2.ª edição: News, with Robson Moreira;
- Compartilha: Variety, with Filipe Almeida;
- + Diário: Magazine program, with Jéssica Leão;
- Diário Comunidade: Journalistic program, with Janaina Rodrigues;

Relayed from TV Globo São Paulo

- Bom Dia São Paulo: Morning news, with Rodrigo Bocardi;
- Globo Esporte SP: Sports news, with Felipe Andreoli;
- Futebol na Globo: Soccer matches from the teams of the state of São Paulo

Overnight, to comply with the minimum schedule stipulated by law, TV Diário airs Faixa da Madrugada, which is made up of repeats of news and other productions of the station, pre-empting Sessão Comédia na Madruga on weekdays, Corujão on Saturdays and Cinemaço on Sundays. Other programs that are no longer produced by the station:

- Alô Cidadão
- Alô, Saúde
- Alto Tietê Revista
- Bom Dia São Paulo (local edition)
- D Noite em Notícias
- Diário TV 3ª edição
- Esporte D
- Estação Mix
- Madrugada Mix
- SPTV (local edition, replaced by Diário TV)

The station also relayed Nosso Campo, produced by TV TEM, Terra da Gente, produced by EPTV, and Giro São Paulo, produced in conjunction with the other Globo affiliates in São Paulo.
