= 1994 in Brazilian television =

This is a list of Brazilian television related events from 1994.

== Events ==
- 1 May - The Brazilian channels, Globo and Bandeirantes, gain the most viewers due to the death of the three-time Formula 1 champion Ayrton Senna, who suffered the car accident at the Tamburello curve.
- 6 May - Globo Repórter airs a special program in tribute to Ayrton Senna.
- 1 June - TV Fronteira signs on in Presidente Prudente, replacing the TV Modelo relay station.
- 17 July - Brazil beat Italy 3–2 on penalties to win the 1994 World Cup at Pasadena, California in the United States.

== Debuts ==
- 9 May - Castelo Rá-Tim-Bum (1994–1997)

== Television shows ==
=== 1970s ===
- Turma da Mônica (1976–present)

== Networks and services ==
=== Launches ===
| Network | Type | Launch date | Notes | Source |
|---|---|---|---|---|
| TV Fronteira | Terrestrial | 1 June | | |
| HBO Brasil | Cable and satellite | 1 July | | |
| Star Channel | Cable television | 17 September | | |
| Discovery Channel Brazil | Cable television | 25 September | | |

== See also ==
- 1994 in Brazil
