= Agência Pública =

Brazilian investigative journalism agency

- One scoop per day
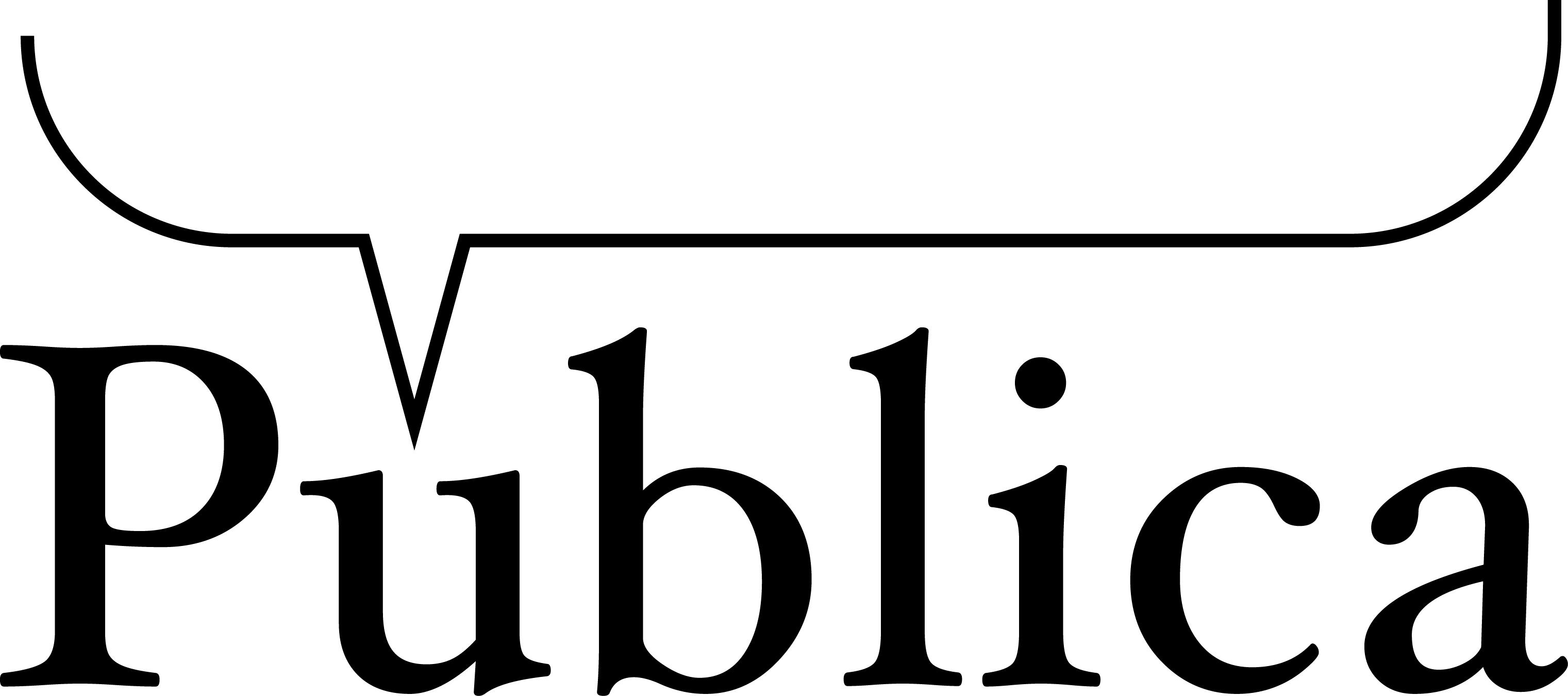
- Format: Diary
- Founder(s): Marina Amaral; Natália Viana; Tatiana Merlino
- Editor: Mariana Amaral; Natalia Viana
- Founded: 2011; 15 years ago
- Language: Portuguese
- Headquarters: São Paulo
- Country: Brazil
- Website: apublica.org
- Free online archives: Yes

Agência Pública is a Brazilian investigative and independent journalism agency. It was founded in 2011 by the reporters Marina Amaral, Natália Viana and Tatiana Merlino. It is currently run by Marina Amaral and Natália Viana.

Agência Pública has received multiple awards for having produced excellent reports on subjects of public interest with the objectives of strengthening the right to information, helping to qualify the democratic debate, and promoting human rights.

The agency distributes its content free of charge, including to other sites and platforms to republish their reports, under the Creative Commons Attribution NonDerivative license.

== Projects ==
=== Support for independent journalism ===
In addition to its own reports, Pública distributes grants to: independent reporters to develop their stories, incubate journalism initiatives and launch the Independent Journalism Map in 2016.

The Agência Pública office is located in São Paulo and, since 2016, the organization has run the Casa Pública, the first Cultural Center of Journalism in Brazil.

=== Truco ===
Since 2014, the Agência Pública has maintained a fact-checking project, Truco. The project is dedicated to checking the rhetoric of politicians and personalities when they make relevant statements that lead to debates about society. Truco checked the 2014 presidential elections and the 2016 municipal elections. It is one of the fact checking projects that has received the facts verification mark from Google.

== Funding ==
Pública is funded by various foundations, such as the Ford Foundation, Betty and Jacob Lafer Foundation, the Open Society Foundations, the Oak Foundation, and when required, resorts to crowdfunding to fund reporting.

== Awards ==
Pública was the third most awarded Brazilian communication vehicle in 2016, a first of its kind feat for an independent publication according to the site "Mais Premiados." In that same year, its director, Natália Viana was the most awarded reporter, for the awards Comunique-se of Written Media Reporter, Gabriel Garcia Marquez in the category Text and Vladmir Herzog in the category Internet by special "100".

It was the first Brazilian media vehicle nominated for the Freedom of the Press Award from Reporters Without Borders.

=== 2016 ===
- Vladimir Herzog Award
- Prêmio Gabriel Garcia Marquez
- Prêmio Comunique-se
- Prêmio José Lutzenberger de Jornalismo Ambiental
- Troféu Mulher Imprensa
- Prêmio Délio Rocha
- Prêmio Petrobrás de Jornalismo
- Prêmio República
- Prêmio Direitos Humanos de Jornalismo

=== 2015 ===
- Prêmio Tim Lopes
- Prêmio Petrobrás de Jornalismo
- Prêmio Roche de Jornalismo em Saúde
- Online Journalism Awards
- Prêmio Direitos Humanos de Jornalismo

=== 2014 ===
- Prêmio SindhRio de Jornalismo e Saúde
- Prêmio MPT de Jornalismo
- Prêmio Direitos Humanos de Jornalismo

=== 2013 ===
- Prêmio HSBC – Jornalistas & Cia
- Troféu Mulher Imprensa

=== 2012 ===
- Prêmio HSBC – Jornalistas & Cia de Jornalismo Ambiental
- Prêmio Allianz Seguros de Jornalismo Ambiental
- Prêmio Direitos Humanos de Jornalismo
