= Brasileiros (magazine) =

Brazilian defunct magazine

- Editor: Hélio Campos Mello
- Categories: News magazine
- Frequency: monthly
- Publisher: Brasileiros Editora Ltda.
- Founder: Hélio Campos Mello
- Founded: 2007
- First issue: July 2007; 19 years ago
- Final issue: May 2017
- Country: Brazil
- Based in: São Paulo
- Language: Portuguese
- ISSN: 1981-559X

Brasileiros (Brazilians in Portuguese) was a monthly feature magazine published by Brasileiros Editora Ltda., launched in July 2007. The publishing house was led by Hélio Campos Mello, and its editorial board included journalists Fernando Morais, Jorge Caldeira, Luiz Lara, Nirlando Beirão, Ricardo Kotscho, and the scientist Miguel Nicolelis, among others.

== Trajectory ==
With a declared circulation of 30,000 copies per issue in 2008, the magazine covered aspects of Brazilian culture and the lives of Brazilians (whether famous or not). Perhaps the magazine's most notable issue was number 6, which featured an interview with President Luiz Inácio Lula da Silva conducted by Ricardo Kotscho, as well as a special insert on the best vacation spots.

=== Arte! Brasileiros ===
As of May 2017, the magazine ceased print publication and migrated entirely to the PáginaB! portal, which launched in August of the same year. The management and staff remain essentially the same. Subsequently, PáginaB changed to ARTE!Brasileiros.

== Awards ==
=== Vladimir Herzog Award ===
Vladimir Herzog Award for Magazines

Year	Work	Magazine	Author	Outcome
2013	"O primeiro voo do condor" (The first flight of the condor)	Revista Brasileiros	Wagner William	Won
