= TV Santos =

TV Santos (PRB-4)
Santos, São Paulo; Brazil
- Channels: Analog: 5 (VHF)

Programming
- Affiliations: TV Paulista

Ownership
- Owner: Organizações Victor Costa; (Rebratel - Rede Brasileira de Televisão S.A.)

History
- First air date: November 15, 1957
- Last air date: 1960

Technical information
- Licensing authority: MiniCom

TV Santos
- Replaced by: TV Paulista

TV Santos was the first inland television station in Brazil and also the first outside of a state capital, as well as the fourth in the state of São Paulo overall. Headquartered in Santos, the station operated on channel 5 and was owned by Organizações Victor Costa, owners of TV Paulista in São Paulo.

== History ==
TV Santos emerged thanks to an agreement between Rádio Clube de Santos and Organizações Victor Costa, owner of TV Paulista, at a time when 4,000 television sets installed in Santos received the signals of the three stations coming from the state capital with precarious reception. The transmitter was installed at Serra do Mar, with its tower at Ilha Porchat and also the first to operate entirely with Brazilian equipment, from local company Rebratel. It was formally inaugurated on November 15, 1957, with the participation of renowned national and international radio and television artists. The launch coincided with the 86th anniversary of the proclamation of the republic in Brazil. The inaugural broadcast ended at 11pm. OVC also had the plans to launch TV Excelsior on channel 9 in São Paulo, which ultimately launched in 1960 under the control of the Simonsen family.

The station generated local programming in the morning and afternoon hours, relaying TV Paulista in the evening (at launching time, TV Paulista opened at 3pm). One of its early programs was Discopa Musical, sponsored by the local record store Discopa.

The station also aired news bulletins sponsored by Discopa, cartoons, musical programming and local content. On December 31, 1957, the station received a visit from Hebe Camargo, "the Star of São Paulo", who worked at TV Paulista at the time, and was set to host the New Year's special on Rádio Clube de Santos later that evening. That same day, the local programming started at approximately 11:30am and ended at 1:55pm. This constrained schedule would last until the expansion of its transmissions, whereas TV Santos would sign off at 2pm in order to give airtime to TV Paulista.

The station also paved way for Ofélia Anunciato's television cooking career, as well as other celebrities such as Manuel de Nóbrega and Chocolate (Show Panex com Chocolate).

The station was plagued by difficulties that also affected its sister radio station, which was later sold. The businessmen opted to end the local programming, becoming a mere relayer of TV Paulista in 1960. In 1964, when the military dictatorship started, there were concerns over a potential television station in Santos carrying "subversive ideology". TV Paulista was later sold to TV Globo becoming TV Globo São Paulo, and for almost thirty years, there was no locally generated television station.

Today, Globo has an affiliate in Santos, TV Tribuna.
