= Ricardo Kotscho =

Brazilian journalist and author

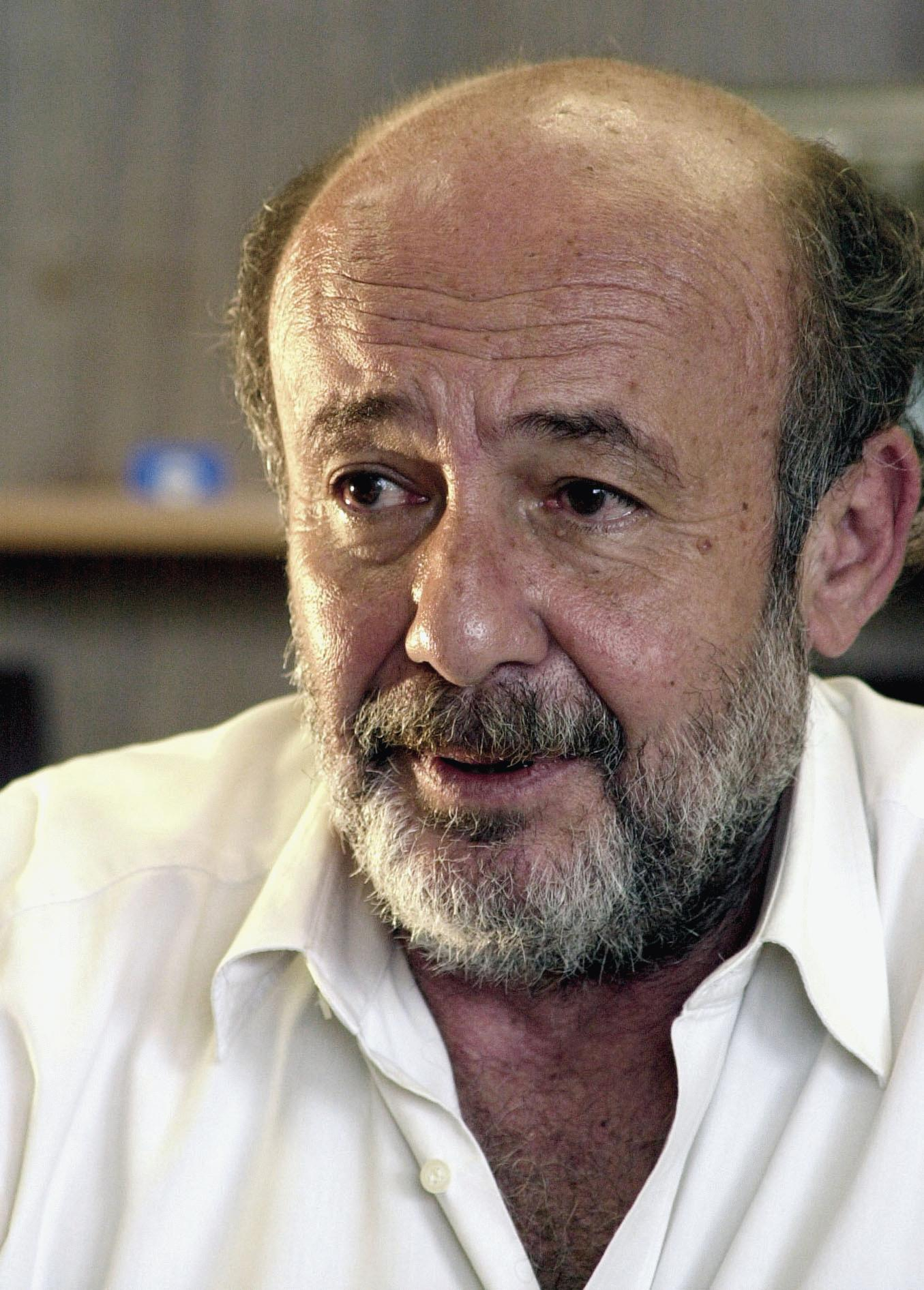
Ricardo Kotscho, 2004.

Ricardo Kotscho (born in São Paulo on March 16, 1948) is a Brazilian journalist and author. He was awarded twice with the Esso Journalism Award and twice with the Vladimir Herzog Award. During his career, he worked in several major newspapers, magazines and TV channels, such as O Estado de S. Paulo, IstoÉ magazine, Folha de S. Paulo, Canal 21 of Rede Bandeirantes, SBT and CNT/Gazeta. From 2003 to 2004, he served as the Secretary of Press and Divulgation of the Presidency of the Republic for Lula's government. Nowadays, he is a Special Reporter for Brasileiros magazine.

== Bibliography ==
- A prática da reportagem (Editora Ática)
- Serra Pelada: uma ferida aberta na selva (Editora Brasiliense)
- Explode um novo Brasil — Diário da campanha das Diretas (Brasiliense)
- Do golpe ao Planalto — Uma vida de repórter (Companhia das Letras)
