= TV TEM Bauru =

TV TEM Bauru (ZYB 856)
Bauru, São Paulo; Brazil
- Channels: Digital: 26 (UHF); Virtual: 26
- Branding: TV TEM

Programming
- Affiliations: TV Globo

Ownership
- Owner: Traffic Group; (TV Bauru Ltda.)

History
- First air date: August 1, 1960
- Former names: TV Bauru (1960-1984); Rede Globo Oeste Paulista (1984-1998); TV Modelo (1998-2003)
- Former channel numbers: Analog: 2 (VHF, 1960–2018)
- Former affiliations: TV Paulista (1960-1965)

Technical information
- Licensing authority: ANATEL
- ERP: 4.2 kW
- Transmitter coordinates: 22°21′35.6″S 49°5′59.5″W

Links
- Public license information: Profile
- Website: redeglobo.globo.com/sp/tvtem

TV TEM Bauru (channel 26) is a Brazilian television station based in Bauru, a city in the state of São Paulo, affiliated with TV Globo. It is owned-and-operated by Traffic Group as of 2003 under the TV TEM banner, which also owns three other stations under said name in the inland of São Paulo, and covers approximately 95 municipalities. Its studios are located in the Jardim Bela Vista neighborhood, and its transmission antenna is in the Jardim Ouro Verde neighborhood.

== History ==
=== Background ===
In the 1950s, Italian-Brazilian businessman João Simonetti, founder of Rádio Clube Bauru, Bauru's first radio station, decided to establish the city's first television station. Still during the Getúlio Vargas government, Simonetti asked the president to grant him a television channel, which was granted to him only at the end of the decade, in 1959. He also invested around Cr$7.5 million in necessary equipment for the creation of the station, and also signed a contract with Mário Wallace Simonsen's REBRATEL, enabling the possibility to install 1000 television sets in the city. Still in 1959, viewers were able to see TV Bauru operating on an experimental basis on VHF channel 2.

=== TV Bauru (1960-1984) ===
On August 1, 1960, TV Bauru was officially founded as the first television station in the interior of São Paulo and also in a Brazilian state (existing stations until then had only been founded in capital cities). The station was responsible for producing several variety programs, musical shows, the news program Nosso Jornal, and even a local telenovela that was written and also starred by Clorinda Resta. Several professionals from the city's radio stations also migrated to the new means of communication.

However, the difficulties in maintaining a high-profile television station were enormous. There were few advertisers for the channel, and with money missing from the till, many employees received payments after the due date. All these factors led Simonetti to sell the station to Organizações Victor Costa in October of the same year. With the purchase, there was also a considerable increase in the programming range, with the addition of North American slots and programs relayed from TV Paulista, which was also owned by OVC.

In May 1965, Organizações Victor Costa were sold to Roberto Marinho, who incorporated his outlets into Organizações Globo. With this, TV Bauru became an owned-and-operated station of Rede Globo, together with TV Paulista, which in 1967 was renamed TV Globo São Paulo. Under the direction of Arceno Athas, local productions are gradually being phased out, and only journalism is being prioritized. The programs Globo Interior and Globo Agora à Noite stood out at that time, which were produced and also presented by journalists such as Roberto Purini, Edson Fagnani, João Dias Antunes and Fred Calmon. However, these programs were gradually replaced by Jornal Nacional, broadcast via satellite.

In 1971, with the emergence of Jornal Hoje, the station created a local version of the newscast presented by Alonso Padilha, however, this was gradually replaced by the São Paulo version presented by Marília Gabriela. The station reached the end of the 1970s with only a reporting team made up of reporter Jair Acetuno, cameramen Moacir Mendonça and Walcir Coelho, and lighting designer Carlos Corrente, who together only produced reports shown during Jornal das Sete, produced in São Paulo. On February 28, 1980, the station started showing a 2-minute local block of JS, which on January 3, 1983, was replaced by SPTV.

=== Rede Globo Oeste Paulista (1984-1998) ===
The outlook remained the same until 1984, when the Central Globo de Affiliadas e Expansão emerged to improve and revitalize all the journalism of Globo's owned-and-operated stations and affiliates. In the meantime, on October 24, 1984, TV Bauru was renamed Rede Globo Oeste Paulista. US$2.5 million were invested in the purchase of new equipment and the creation of branches in the municipalities of São José do Rio Preto, Marília and Presidente Prudente, and three months later, a branch was also created in Araçatuba, covering 260 municipalities from the interior of the state. The number of journalism teams now stood at 11, and SPTV, which until then occupied only a small block of news bulletins generated in São Paulo, gains two editions, at 12:45 pm and 7:45 pm.

On April 21, 1986, the station's branches in Araçatuba and São José do Rio Preto were separated, and TV Globo Noroeste Paulista was created, also following the same pattern as the Bauru station. On July 9, 1990, Rede Globo stations in São Paulo replaced SPTV with SP Já, with the first edition being relayed from Globo São Paulo, and the second produced locally by TV Globo Oeste Paulista.

On April 11, 1994, with the return of Jornal Hoje to the state of São Paulo, the first edition of SP Já also began to be produced by Globo Oeste Paulista. It was also in that year that, with the emergence of TV Fronteira Paulista, on June 1, the broadcaster stopped covering the Mesoregion of Presidente Prudente, restricting its coverage, which in 1984 was from 260 municipalities to 113 municipalities. In 1996, SP Já was axed and the station returned to produce SPTV.

=== TV Modelo (1998-2003) ===
In the late 1990s, Central Globo de Affiliadas e Expansão launched the "Projeto Regional do Futuro", which aimed to give greater autonomy to Rede Globo's O&Os in inland São Paulo and also to TV Globo Juiz de Fora in Minas Gerais, as well as the expansion of local programming and interaction with the local community. With this, TV Globo Oeste Paulista is renamed TV Modelo, and new programs werre also created, such as Modelo Esporte, shown before the São Paulo version of Globo Esporte; Comunidade no Ar, a bulletin shown during the program that showed actions by philanthropic entities, NGOs, among others; Interação, a weekly magazine program shown on Saturdays, and Nosso Campo, a program about local agribusiness, which was produced together with TV Fronteira, TV Progresso in São José do Rio Preto and TV Aliança Paulista in Sorocaba. The station also showed Terra da Gente, which was produced by EPTV Campinas.

Regional campaigns and projects were also implemented, such as the "Campanha do Agasalho", "Semana da Faxina", "Música na Praça", "Recreança", as well as "Ação Global", carried out in partnership with SESI, as well as sporting events such as the Copa TV Modelo de Futsal and the Copa de Vôlei de Praia TV Modelo. All of these events aimed to bring the identity of the broadcaster and others even closer to the region where they were established, and most of them still occur today. This regionalization also affected the broadcaster's journalism, when SPTV, following the remodeling of Globo's local journalism standard, began to have an editorial line closer to the community.

In 2002, Organizações Globo incurred a huge debt resulting from investments in Globosat channels and pay TV companies, which exceeded R$2 billion in October of that year. As a way to alleviate expenses, Rede Globo sold its shares in 15 broadcasters in which it had a stake or were owned by it. In this way, 90% of TV Modelo's shares, along with another 90% of TV Progresso in São José do Rio Preto and TV Aliança Paulista in Sorocaba were sold to businessman José Hawilla (owner of the Traffic Group, a sports marketing company), for a value between R$120 and 180 million.

=== TV TEM Bauru (2003-present) ===
On May 6, 2003, with the purchase already approved by CADE and the Ministry of Communications, the TV stations in Bauru, Sorocaba and São José do Rio Preto began to form TV TEM (acronym for Traffic Entertainment and Marketing), which together with the Itapetininga station, founded on the same day, it now covers 318 municipalities in the interior of São Paulo, totaling 49% of the state of São Paulo. TV Modelo then changed its name to TV TEM Bauru, and the programs shown until then were extinguished and replaced by Bom Dia Cidade, successor to the local block of Bom Dia São Paulo, and TEM Notícias, successor to SPTV . The remaining programs will be produced by TV TEM Sorocaba, the network's parent company.

Following the decision taken by Globo to end its contract with TV Fronteira due to political scandals, TV TEM Bauru will cover Presidente Prudente again effective January 1, 2025. The transition was later delayed to August 30th of that year.

== Technical information ==
| Virtual channel | Digital channel | Aspect ratio | Content |
|---|---|---|---|
| 26.1 | UHF 26 | 1080i | TV TEM Bauru/Globo's main programming |

The station inaugurated its digital signal on July 23, 2012, in a ceremony held at its headquarters in Bauru. The president of TV TEM, J.Hawilla, and the director of Central Globo de Afiliadas, Cláudia Quaresma, symbolically pressed a button that activated the broadcaster's digital signal, via UHF channel 26. The station's news programs, however, began to be shown in high definition only on June 2, 2015, with the exception of programs retransmitted from TV TEM Sorocaba already shown in the format.

Based on the federal decree transitioning Brazilian TV stations from analogue to digital signals, TV TEM Bauru, as well as the other stations in Bauru, ceased broadcasting on VHF channel 2 on March 28, 2018, following the official schedule from ANATEL.

In addition to retransmitting Globo's national programming, TV TEM currently produces and broadcasts the following programs:

- Bom Dia Cidade: Morning news, with Thais Andrioli;
- TEM Notícias 1st edition: Noon news, with Yonny Furukawa;
- TEM Notícias 2nd edition: Evening, with Douglas Belan;
- TEM Informa: News bulletins, throughout the day;

Relayed from TV TEM Sorocaba, the head station:

- Revista de Sábado: Magazine program, with Marcos Paiva and Priscila Tanganelli;
- Nosso Campo: Agribusiness, with Antônio Nóbrega;

Relayed from TV Globo São Paulo

- Bom Dia São Paulo with Rodrigo Bocardi;
- Globo Esporte SP withFelipe Andreoli;
- Futebol na Globo (matches with teams from the state of São Paulo).
