= TV TEM Itapetininga =

TV TEM Itapetininga (ZYB 897)
- Itapetininga, São Paulo; Brazil
- Channels: Digital: 26 (UHF); Virtual: 26

Programming
- Affiliations: TV Globo

Ownership
- Owner: Traffic Group; (Novo Interior Comunicações Ltda.)

History
- Founded: May 6, 2003
- Former channel numbers: Analog: 8 (VHF, 2003-2018)

Technical information
- Licensing authority: ANATEL
- Transmitter coordinates: 23°34′39″S 48°02′18.1″W

Links
- Public license information: Profile
- Website: redeglobo.globo.com/sp/tvtem

TV TEM Itapetininga (channel 26) is a television station in Itapetininga, São Paulo, Brazil, affiliated with TV Globo, member of TV TEM and owned by Traffic Group. TV TEM Itapetininga's studios and transmitter are located at Itapê Shopping, on Doutor Coutinho Street, in the downtown of the city.

== History ==
The license of the channel 8 VHF from Itapetininga was granted, after public competition, by the president Fernando Henrique Cardoso, on April 3, 2002, to Novo Interior Comunicações Ltda., society integrated by Miriam Ortolan and Maria Isabel Pestana. In the same time, Rede Globo was putting for sale its acionary shareholding in 27 stations around the country due to financial problems related to unsuccessful investments on Globo Cabo. The sale included its owned-and-operated stations in Sorocaba (TV Aliança), Bauru (TV Modelo) and São José do Rio Preto (TV Progresso), that were acquired on September of the same year by the businessman José Hawilla, owner of the Traffic Group. On December, Hawilla also acquired half of the shares of Novo Interior Comunicações Ltda., integrating the channel from Itapetininga at the future network.

From the union of the four stations, on May 6, 2003, emerged TV TEM, that passed to cover 49% of the state of São Paulo. TV TEM Itapetininga, inaugurated on the same day, took over its channel to circa 50 cities of the region of Alto Paranapanema, previously covered by the now TV TEM Sorocaba. In the first weeks, the station relayed all the programming generated by the flagship station of the network in Sorocaba, until the conclusion of its studios in Itapê Shopping, on June 30, when its local newscasts passed to be produced.

In April 2020, due to spending cuts caused by COVID-19 pandemic, the station fired journalists and ended the local production of TEM Notícias 1ª Edição, passing to relay the newscast generated by TV TEM Sorocaba. In January 2022, also due to COVID-19, there was the time to TEM Notícias 2ª Edição be discontinued.

== Digital television ==
Channel	Res.	Programming
26.1	1080i	Main TV TEM Itapetininga programming / TV Globo

The station started its digital transmissions on December 2, 2013, over UHF channel 26, to Itapetininga and nearby areas. The station turned off its analog signal, over VHF channel 8, on December 12, 2018, as part of the federally mandated transition from analog to digital television. The station's digital signal remains on its pre-transition UHF channel 26, using virtual channel 26.
