= Socorro (district of São Paulo) =

District of São Paulo, Brazil

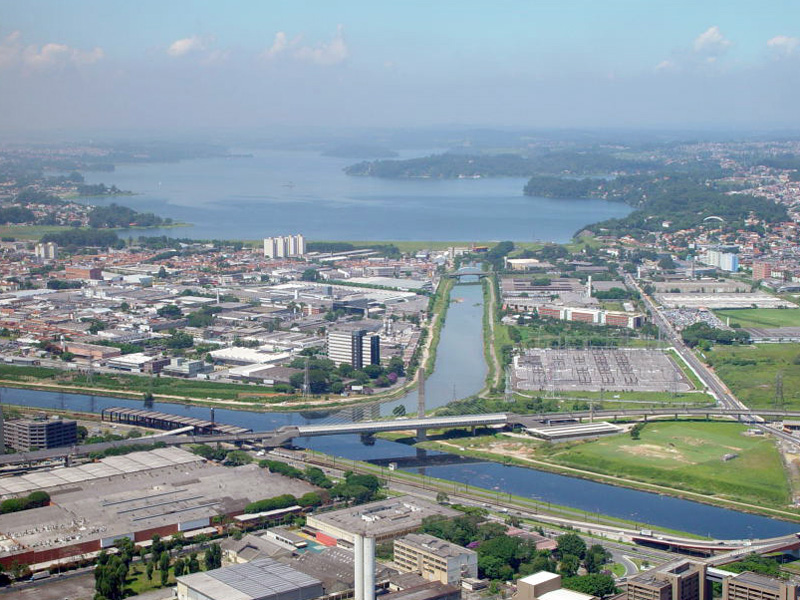
- Socorro district with the Guarapiranga reservoir at the background

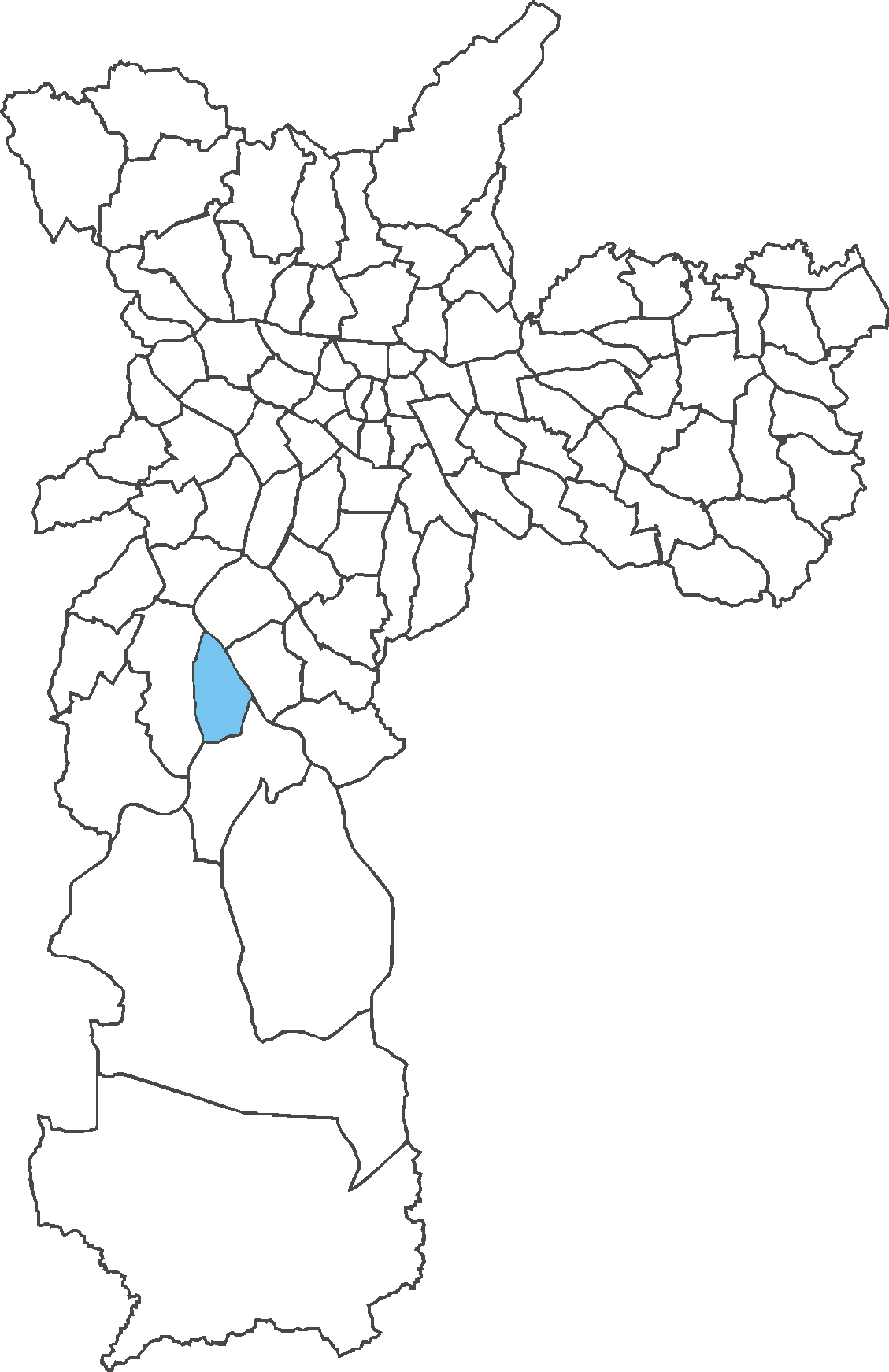
- Location in the city of São Paulo
- Country: Brazil
- State: São Paulo
- City: São Paulo

Government
  - Type: Subprefecture
  - Subprefect: Marco Antônio Augusto

Area
  - Total: 11.65 km^{2} (4.50 sq mi)

Population (2008)
  - Total: 36,155
  - Density: 3,103.39/km^{2} (8,037.7/sq mi)
- Website: Subprefecture of Capela do Socorro

Socorro (Portuguese for "Help" or "Aid") is a district in southern São Paulo, Brazil. Originally part of the Santo Amaro district, it is now part of the subprefecture of Capela do Socorro. Both the Guarapiranga and Billings Reservoirs are located in the district, making it a popular location for the practice of nautical sports. Between the two reservoirs lies the Autódromo Interlagos, which hosts the Brazilian Grand Prix and Formula One races.

== Education ==
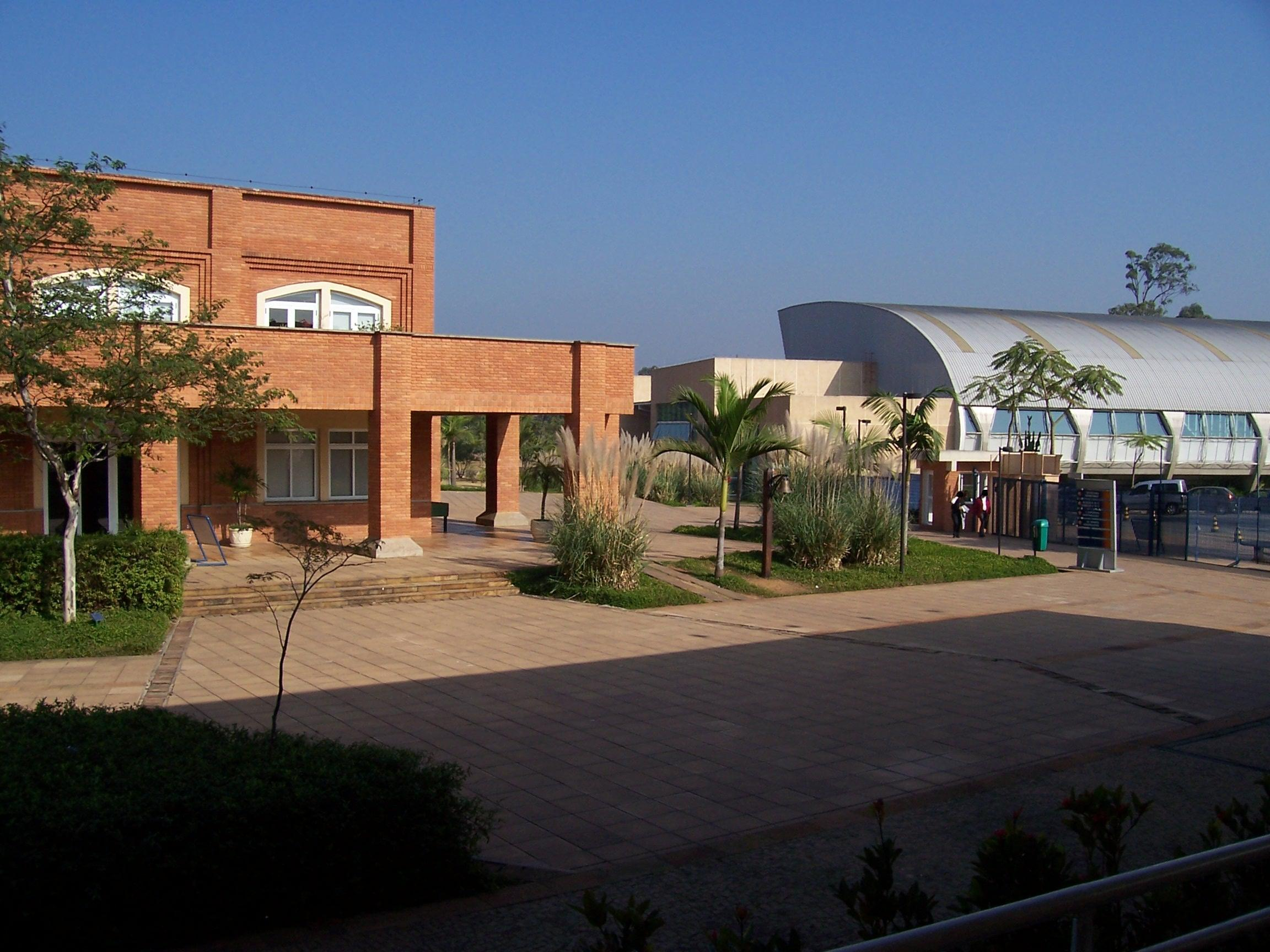
Colégio Humboldt São Paulo

Colégio Humboldt São Paulo, a German international school, is located in Interlagos in Socorro.

== Neighborhoods ==
- Interlagos
- Jardim Bessa
- Vila Califórnia
- Capela do Socorro
- Jardim Cristina
- Vila Franca
- Vila Friburgo
- Jardim Guarapiranga
- Parque Interlagos
- Jardim Ipanema
- Jardim do Lago
- Vila Lisboa
- Jardim Mara
- Jardim Marabá
- Jardim Nova Guarapiranga
- Jardim Paquetá
- Parque Rony
- Jardim Santa Helena
- Jardim São Jorge
- Jardim São José de Guarapiranga
- Socorro
- Jardim Socorro
- Vila Socorro
- Jardim Suzana
- Jardim Tereza
- Jardim Três Marias
- Veleiros
- Jardim Veneza

== See also ==
- Socorro (CPTM) Train Station
- Roman Catholic Diocese of Santo Amaro
- Line 9 (CPTM)
