= TV TEM =

Brazilian regional television network based in the state of São Paulo

- Type: Broadcast television network
- Country: Brazil
- Broadcast area: Regions of Sorocaba, Bauru, São José do Rio Preto, Itapetininga and Presidente Prudente
- Headquarters: Sorocaba, São Paulo

Programming
- Language: Brazilian Portuguese

Ownership
- Owner: Traffic Group

History
- Launched: May 6, 2003
- Founder: José Hawilla

Links
- Website: redeglobo.globo.com/sp/tvtem

TV TEM (stylized in lowercase; initials of Traffic Entertainment and Marketing) is a Brazilian regional television network affiliated with TV Globo. Its headquarters are located in Sorocaba, São Paulo. It covers 373 cities of the state of São Paulo.

Its main programs are Bom Dia Cidade, TEM Notícias, Nosso Campo and Muito Mais.

== History ==
TV TEM was founded on May 6, 2003, by the businessman José Hawilla, with the junction of four stations: TV Aliança (Sorocaba), TV Modelo (Bauru) and TV Progresso (São José do Rio Preto), in addition of the foundation of TV Itapetininga (Itapetininga). Before TV TEM existing, the stations that integrate it were "independents", in other words, they don't formed a regional network.

In May 2011, two of its stations (Sorocaba and Bauru) joined Via Embratel.

On January 1, 2013, in the celebrations of the 10 years of TV TEM, its logo was modernized, following the same metalized standard that severe TV Globo-affiliated stations still use. The sertanejo duo Chitãozinho & Xororó recorded the music Presente Pra Você (A Gift to You), that was the theme of the celebrations of the tenth anniversary of the network, in association with the SESI Symphony Orchestra of São Paulo, conducted by the conductor João Carlos Martins.

On May 25, 2018, its founder José Hawilla died at age 74 in São Paulo, with respiratory complications.

On December 22, 2019, TV TEM presented its third logo in the commercial break of Fantástico, leaving the traditional blue, the rainbow colors inside the logo, the standard typography that Rede Globo used, part of the rims that accompanied since the start (where until then it remembered a camera lens), and it adopted a simpler style: the two spheres and the first rim that contours them were maintained, now in white color, and a new color gradient (from violet to yellow), compose the current logo. The name "TV TEM" is now written in lowercase.

On October 25, 2024, there was announced that TV TEM would pass to cover the region of Presidente Prudente, replacing TV Fronteira. But, in July 2025, TV Fronteira started a judicial action, asking for the permanence of the affiliation with TV Globo. In favroable decision to TV Fronteira on August 5, TV TEM would be impeded to take over the transmission on September 1, 2025, until the final decision about the case. But, on August 28, 2025, TV Globo got a legal turnaround, revoking the decision of the day 5 that would stay TV Fronteira as its affiliated by indefinite period. Globo had negotiated a period of six more months, staying as its affiliated until March 2026, but the same rejected the agreement, asking for thirty months. The period estipulated by Globo for the end of the affiliation with Fronteira would be until 11:59 PM of August 30, and starting 12 AM of August 31, TV TEM Bauru would take over definitely TV Globo in Presidente Prudente.

TV TEM Bauru started its transmissions in Presidente Prudente around midnight of August 31 with a slide on the screen, greeting the viewers after months of tests and soliciting the tuning of the new station during the commercial break of the program Altas Horas. However, only the city of Presidente Prudente had the signal of TV TEM Bauru available, while 55 cities neighboring to the region ended up without the signal of TV Globo, remaining as alternative accompany the station via Globoplay or in streamings of the operators of cable television and in the fiber optic and satellite services, that quickly replaced the signal of TV Fronteira by TEM.

== Stations ==
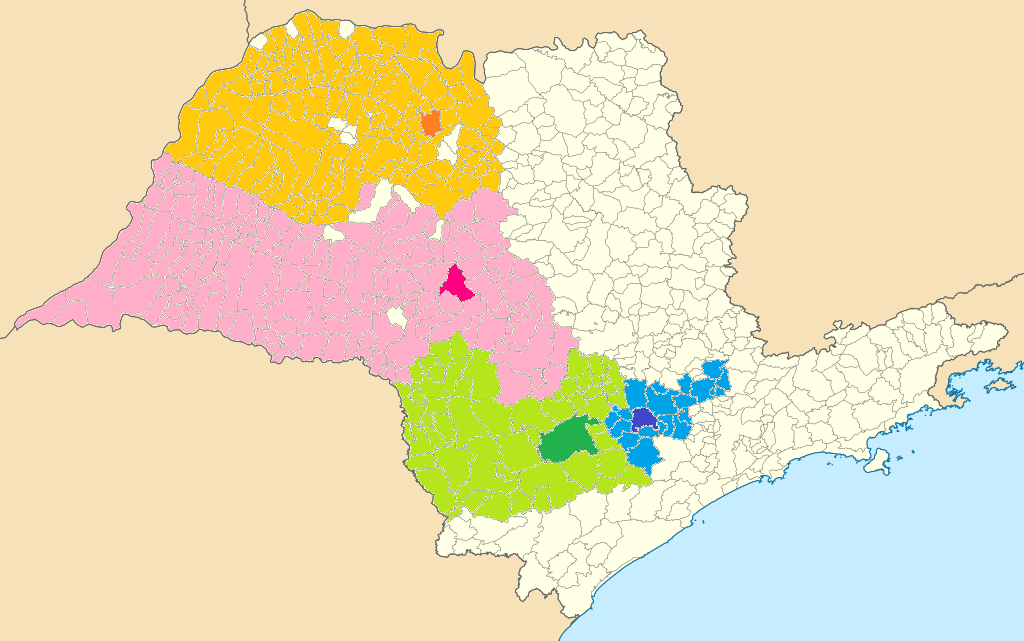
Division of TV TEM's coverage area by station.

Callsign	Station	Channel	Location	State
ZYB 873	TV TEM Sorocaba	26 (UHF) (digital)	Sorocaba	São Paulo
ZYB 856	TV TEM Bauru	26 (UHF) (digital)	Bauru	São Paulo
ZYB 866	TV TEM São José do Rio Preto	26 (UHF) (digital)	São José do Rio Preto	São Paulo
ZYB 897	TV TEM Itapetininga	26 (UHF) (digital)	Itapetininga	São Paulo
