= TV Tribuna (Santos) =

TV Tribuna (ZYB 883)
Santos, São Paulo; Brazil
- Channels: Digital: 18 (UHF); Virtual: 19
- Branding: TV Tribuna

Programming
- Affiliations: TV Globo

Ownership
- Owner: Grupo Tribuna; (SAT Sistema A Tribuna de Comunicação-Santos Ltda.)

History
- First air date: February 1, 1992
- Former channel numbers: Analog: 19 (VHF, 1992–2018)

Technical information
- Licensing authority: ANATEL
- ERP: 4.5 kW
- Transmitter coordinates: 23°57′45.4″S 46°21′37.2″W

Links
- Public license information: Profile
- Website: redeglobo.globo.com/sp/tvtribuna

TV Tribuna (channel 18) is a Brazilian television station based in Santos, São Paulo. The station, a TV Globo affiliate, is owned by Grupo Tribuna, who also owns newspaper A Tribuna, the Primeiramão classified service and radio station Tri FM. Its studios are located on Tribuna Square, in downtown Santos, and its transmitting tower is on Morro do Voturuá, in São Vicente.

== History ==
On March 7, 1990, president José Sarney granted the license of UHF channel 18 to Sistema A Tribuna de Comunicação, through Decree nº 99.509, published on Diário Oficial da União. Initially expected to open on December 1, 1991, the station was only founded on February 1, 1992, by the owner of A Tribuna, Roberto Mário Santini, being a Globo affiliate from the outset. Until then, the Globo signal was available from a relay station of TV Globo São Paulo available on channel 8. The frequency was later occupied by TV Mar, which is the current Record Litoral e Vale.

Initially, its signal was limited to Santos and eight further municipalities of the Baixada Santista region, later expanding its signal to the municipalities that make up Vale do Ribeira, further south. On January 2, 2007, with the death of Roberto Mário Santini, control of the station and Sistema A Tribuna de Comunicação's other assets was handed over to his son, Roberto Clemente Santini.

In March 2016, the station left its former facilities in São Vicente, located at Edifício Ana Izabel Cabral, to a building annex to Tribuna Square, commercial building inaugurated in downtown Santos in 2014, where its new facilities started operating.

== Technical information ==
Virtual channel	Physical channel	Screen	Content
18.1	19 UHF	1080i	TV Tribuna / Globo's main programming

The station started its digital broadcasts on March 30, 2009, through UHF channel 19, becoming the first station in the Baixada Santista area to do so. The solemnity of the inauguration was broadcast live on Jornal da Tribuna 2ª edição, and had the participation of then-station president, Roberto Clemente Santini, minister of communications Hélio Costa, governor of São Paulo José Serra, and directors of the station and Rede Globo. Since December 26, 2010, the station produces its content in high definition.

The station shut down its analog signal on December 20, 2017.
