= Band Paulista =

TV Bandeirantes Paulista (ZYB 876)
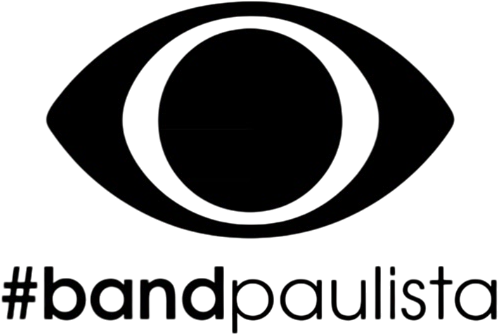

Presidente Prudente, São Paulo; Brazil
- Channels: Digital: 19 (UHF); Virtual: 10
- Branding: Band Paulista

Programming
- Affiliations: Rede Bandeirantes

Ownership
- Owner: Grupo Bandeirantes de Comunicação; (Televisão Bandeirantes de Presidente Prudente Ltda.)

History
- First air date: December 13, 1982
- Former names: Band Presidente Prudente; Band SP Interior (to 2017)
- Former channel numbers: Analog: 10 (VHF, 1982–2018)

Technical information
- Licensing authority: ANATEL
- ERP: 20.9905 kW
- Transmitter coordinates: 22°7′30.2″S 51°23′15.2″W

Links
- Public license information: Profile
- Website: bandtv.band.uol.com.br/tv/paulista

TV Bandeirantes Paulista is a Rede Bandeirantes-owned-and-operated station licensed to Presidente Prudente, São Paulo. Its coverage area includes the West, Center-West, Northwest e Nova Alta Paulista in São Paulo, covering a large part of the state's inland, and other key cities such as Assis, Araçatuba, Bauru, Marília, Ourinhos, and others. Its studios are located in Presidente Prudente, at Jardim Santana, and its transmitting antenna is located atop Edifício Ouro Branco, in the city's central area. In São José do Rio Preto, it has studios since February 2020 at Plaza Avenida Shopping, in Jardim Redentor, and its transmitters are located at Parque São Miguel.

== History ==
In 1972, Presidente Prudente did not have a strong television signal available locally. The existing transmitter was only used to relay TV Record's relay, which was located in Araçatuba. Antonio de Figueiredo Feitosa, in 1975, took on the idea of establishing a television license for the city. For this end, he established Rádio e Televisão Andorinha S/A on September 9, 1976, to occupy VHF channel 10, which up until then was occupied by a relay station of TV Globo São Paulo. Other companies disputed the bid, such as TV Record, TV Bandeirantes and TV Comercial.

Due to political misunderstandings, the license ended up in the hands of Grupo Bandeirantes, receiving a 15-year license on June 3, 1981. On December 13, 1982, its broadcasts started, covering 299 municipalities in an area defined by the network as RB-2, which was half of the state of São Paulo. A production unit for commercials was installed in 1983, using equipment from TV Vanguarda Cornélio Procópio.

== Technical information ==
Virtual channel	Digital channel	Aspect ratio	Content
10.1	UHF 19	1080i	TV Fronteira/Globo's main programming

The station shut down its analog signal on VHF channel 13 on April 18, 2018, following the official ANATEL roadmap.
