= TV Fronteira Paulista =

TV Fronteira Paulista (ZYB 876)
- Presidente Prudente, São Paulo; Brazil
- Channels: Digital: 31 (UHF)
- Branding: TV Fronteira

Programming
- Affiliations: Record

Ownership
- Owner: Grupo Paulo Lima; (TV Fronteira Paulista Ltda.)
- Sister stations: 99,9 FM; CBN Prudente; Rádio Fronteira

History
- First air date: 1 June 1994; 32 years ago
- Former channel numbers: Analogue: 13 (VHF, 1994–2018)
- Former affiliations: TV Globo (1994–2025); Independent (2025–2026); Jovem Pan (2026)

Technical information
- Licensing authority: ANATEL
- ERP: 3 kW
- Transmitter coordinates: 22°7′23.9″S 51°23′14.8″W

Links
- Public license information: Profile
- Website: ifronteira.com

TV Fronteira Paulista (channel 31, also known as TV Fronteira or titled TV Fronteira Record) is a Brazilian television station affiliated with Record headquartered in Presidente Prudente. It is owned by the Grupo Paulo Lima, which also controls Uno TV, an educational station affiliated with TV Cultura, Rádio 99 FM, Jovem Pan News Prudente and Rádio Fronteira. It broadcasts its programming to 56 municipalities in the western region of the state. Its studios are located in the Vila Charlote neighborhood, while its transmission antenna is atop the Alexandre Fernandes Building in downtown.

== History ==
=== Background ===
In 1989, businessman Paulo Lima opened TV Pontal Paulista, affiliated with Rede Manchete and broadcast on channel 6 VHF in Presidente Prudente. He had the support of his father, federal deputy Agripino Lima, to obtain in Brasília the concession of the second television station to be installed in the city (which until then only had TV Bandeirantes Presidente Prudente, opened in 1982).

=== Globo affiliate ===
In 1994, after obtaining a license for VHF channel 13 and affiliation with Rede Globo, which until then was represented in Presidente Prudente by a branch of TV Globo Oeste Paulista, Paulo Lima shut down TV Pontal on channel 6, and used the station's headquarters to establish the new affiliate of the Rio network.

The station was launched on 1 June 1994 by its shareholder, Paulo César de Oliveira Lima. With the highest audience ratings on regional over-the-air TV, it shows Rede Globo programming, as well as local programs that value the region, always with the standard of quality and diversification that TV Globo maintains.

It was Evandro Guimarães who came up with the name for the station, justifying the fact that its coverage area was not just the Pontal region of western São Paulo, and that the usage of the word "fronteira" (border) also represented a technological border.

Through constant investments, already in December 1997, it was the first entirely digital station in Brazil, relocating to a new building in the process. Even though there was still no digital television in the country yet, it began to produce digital content, gaining significant quality in local productions and optimizing production time. The picture quality of the station was also improved. The jump to digital equipment also implied the creation of new programs, such as Nosso Campo (produced by TV Fronteira and wit the co-operation of adjacent affiliates in Rio Preto and Bauru) and, from 2005, the local interest program Fronteira do Brasil.

A new studio, adapted to the new Praça TV standard, was unveiled in 2018.

On 19 April 2022, TV Fronteira Paulista announced the closure of its branch in the city of Dracena, leading to the dismissal of all employees there. The information caught employees by surprise, who claimed there were no economic problems.

=== Disaffiliation from Globo ===
On 25 October 2024, it was announced that TV Fronteira would no longer affiliate with TV Globo beginning in January 2025, after 30 years. Globo's coverage in the region will be done by TV TEM Bauru (which previously covered Presidente Prudente until 1994) from 1 January 2025, while TV Fronteira hasn't yet announced its future. The switch was later postponed to 31 August 2025, enabling a smoother transition period.

However, on 18 July 2025, TV Fronteira took judicial action against TV Globo, requiring the affiliation contract to be renewed for another five years. The station also accused the network of promoting unfair competition practices to benefit TV TEM. Also according to the station, the end of the affiliation with Globo will make it impossible to continue its activities, leading to the imminent risk of "bankruptcy and mass unemployment".

Globo appealed the situation and obtained an injunction on 28 August, revoking the decision of 5 August, which had determined the affiliation for an indefinite period. As a result, the station was required to stop relying the network's signal effective form the original deadline of 1 September 2025. Furthermore, Globo had proposed a renewal with TV Fronteira for another seven months, which would end in March 2026, being rejected by the station, which wanted another thirty months. Fronteira was also penalized with R$300,000 for legal fees.

After ten months, on 29 August 2025, TV Fronteira announced officially to the public that its 31-year affiliation with TV Globo was ending. The station stated that it would comply with the court decision, in addition to keeping the news programs Bom Dia Fronteira and Fronteira Notícias on the schedule at the same times they were already shown, but without clarifying what the programming would be seen at other times with its departure from Globo. At midnight on August 31st, TV Fronteira suspended TV Globo's network feed during Altas Horas, placing a slide on the screen informing the station's departure and subsequently, a series of promos from other Grupo Paulo Lima outlets.

=== Independent phase and affiliation with Jovem Pan (2025-2026) ===
On 1 September, after over 24 hours airing promos for the station and its sister outlets, as well as announcements about the end of the TV Globo affiliation, TV Fronteira resumed programming with Bom Dia Fronteira, which, like other local news programs, introduced new graphics and a new theme. As a result, the station's programming began to be filled with reruns of news programs, in addition to promos. The morning bulletin had a 10 minute increase, ending at 8:40am, while Fronteira Notícias 2ª Edição now starts at 7pm sharp.

Despite the station being defined to remain independent, TV Fronteira even tried to appeal to regain its TV Globo affiliation in the justice, but without success, with a lawsuit at Superior Tribunal de Justiça (STJ) being discarded by not following the usual procedures, which provided for the case to go to the 2nd instance of the Rio de Janeiro Court. On September 30th, the station's request to return to Globo was denied by the Rio de Janeiro Court of Justice, on the grounds that an injunction would cause legal uncertainty.

On 8 December 2025, TV Fronteira premiered a new regular program on its schedule for the first time since losing its network affiliation: A Nossa Manhã, airing at 10 a.m. and hosted by Tiago Rodrigues. The similarity of the program’s graphics to those used by TV Jovem Pan News sparked speculation that the Prudentina-based station might affiliate with the network, but nothing has been confirmed by the station’s management. On March 20, 2026, the station officially announced on its social media accounts that it would begin rebroadcasting Jovem Pan. Following the announcement, the channel aired Jornal Jovem Pan after Fronteira Notícias 2ª Edição, but on a trial basis while the official start date for broadcasts was being finalized.

On 25 March 2026, after two days of testing, Jovem Pan News' programming officially began airing at 8 p.m. In addition, the new local schedule was announced: Bom Dia Fronteira maintains its duration but now begins at 7 a.m. and ends at 8 a.m.; A Nossa Manhã loses 45 minutes, running from 10 a.m. to 11 a.m.; Fronteira Notícias 1ª Edição loses 15 minutes, starting at 11 a.m. and ending at 12 p.m.; and Fronteira Notícias 2ª Edição, which previously began at 7 p.m. and lasted 45 minutes, has been extended by 15 minutes since the 20th (the start of the tests), now running from 7 p.m. to 8 p.m.

=== Afiliation with Record (2026) ===
On October 7, 2026, the newspaper Folha de S.Paulo reported that the station was in advanced negotiations with Record and might stop rebroadcasting Jovem Pan, which had been an affiliate since March. This information was confirmed on October 27, with the main reasons cited being problems with Jovem Pan’s signal transmission—which relays programs from JP News on a delayed basis—as well as the channel being considered too “niche,” which reportedly made it difficult to attract sponsorships. The network switch was scheduled for November 16.

On November 11, Fronteira announced its new programming schedule following the change in broadcast station. Bom Dia Fronteira would be replaced by Balanço Geral Manhã Prudente, while Fronteira Notícias – 1ª Edição would be replaced by Balanço Geral Prudente and Fronteira Notícias - 2ª Edição by SP Record Prudente and the station would also add new programs such as Conexão Fronteira and Balanço Geral Prudente - Edição de Sábado. Meanwhile, A Nossa Manhã would be discontinued.

TV Fronteira officially launched the new affiliation at midnight on November 16. After the broadcast of Match Gastronômico—the last Jovem Pan program to be rebroadcast by the Prudente-based station—was cut short, a slide featuring its logo alongside Record’s logo began to appear on screen. The station resumed its broadcasts at 1:10 a.m. with a promotional bumper highlighting the new partnership, and shortly thereafter began airing the religious program of the Universal Church of São José do Rio Preto. In addition to the new schedule, TV Fronteira also expanded its coverage area to include five repeaters that previously relayed Record Rio Preto’s broadcasts, now covering 61 municipalities in western São Paulo, while the repeater on channel 7.1 in Presidente Prudente began relaying Record News' programming.

== Controversies ==
During the first electoral debate between the candidates for mayor of Presidente Prudente held by Band Paulista on August 8, 2024, the then candidate and owner of the station, Paulo Lima (PSB), poked competitors such as Record Interior SP and SBT Interior for allegedly not showing negative reports against the then mayor and candidate for re-election of the city, Ed Thomas (MDB), while promoting TV Fronteira for publicizing the scandals. Furthermore, the owner of the channel has also been accused by former employees of moral and sexual harassment and for selling content such as handouts to city halls in the states of São Paulo and Rio de Janeiro, using ghost partners, in an act that is popularly nicknamed "oranges" and other practices reported to the Ministry of Communications.

Lima's statement in the Band debate ended up having negative repercussions behind the scenes at TV Globo, along with other controversies in which the owner was involved, one of which was in the first half of 2024, when he promoted the Agripino Lima Foundation during commercial breaks, while he was a pre-candidate for the PSB, he made attacks on the LGBTQIAP+ community, also associating it with supposed support for the abortionist movement, which led to Globo deciding not to renew the affiliation contract with TV Fronteira, making the decision official on October 25, 2024.

== Current programming ==
In addition to rebroadcasting Record’s national programming, TV Fronteira produces and airs the following programs:

- Balanço Geral SP Prudente - Manhã: news program, with Talita Lopes;
- Balanço Geral SP Prudente: news program, with Tiago Rodrigues;
- Conexão Fronteira: variety program, with Bruna Bachega and Vivian Padovan;
- SP Record Prudente: news program, with Carla Moreno and Murilo Zara;
- Balanço Geral SP Prudente - Edição de Sábado: news program, presented on a rotating basis;

Some programs were part of the station's schedule and have been discontinued:

- Bom Dia São Paulo
- Fronteira do Brasil
- Nosso Campo
- São Paulo Já (local edition)
- SPTV 1ª Edição (local edition)
- SPTV 2ª Edição (local edition)
- A Nossa Manhã
- Bom Dia Fronteira
- Fronteira Notícias
- Globo Comunidade (local edition)
- Fronteira Revista
- Fronteira Esporte
- Fronteira Esporte Clube
- Terra da Gente
- Churrasqueadas

== Technical information ==
Virtual channel	Digital channel	Aspect ratio	Content
31.1	UHF 31	1080i	TV Fronteira’s main programming

TV Fronteira Paulista started its digital broadcasts on December 6, 2010, on UHF channel 31 for Presidente Prudente and additional ten nearby cities. Its local programs started being produced in high definition on 29 March 2018, one day after the date initially foreseen in ANATEL's official schedule for the analog shutdown, which was postponed.

=== Analog-to-digital conversion ===
Based on the federal decree transitioning Brazilian TV stations from analoueg to digital signals, TV Fronteira Paulista, as well as the other stations in Presidente Prudente, ceased broadcasting on VHF channel 13 on 18 April 2018, following the official ANATEL roadmap.
