= Interlagos =

Human settlement in Brazil

Coordinates: 23°42′05″S 46°41′49″W

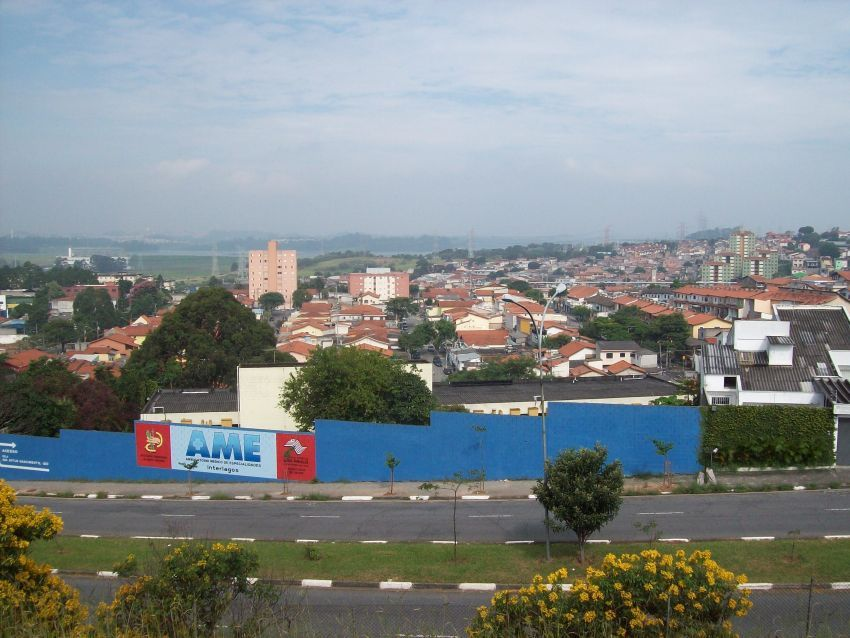
View of Interlagos

Interlagos is a neighborhood located in the district of Socorro in the city of São Paulo, Brazil. Its name comes from the fact that the region is located between two large reservoirs, Guarapiranga and Billings, built in the early 20th century to supply water and electric power to the city. The suburb of Interlagos is located in the south region of São Paulo City on the east bank of the Guarapiranga reservoir.

The Autódromo José Carlos Pace itself is still commonly called Interlagos, although that has not been its official name since the 1970s, and it is actually located in the district of Cidade Dutra, not Socorro.

The history of the Interlagos circuit dates back to the 1920s, when the city of São Paulo was undergoing a process of fast urbanization.

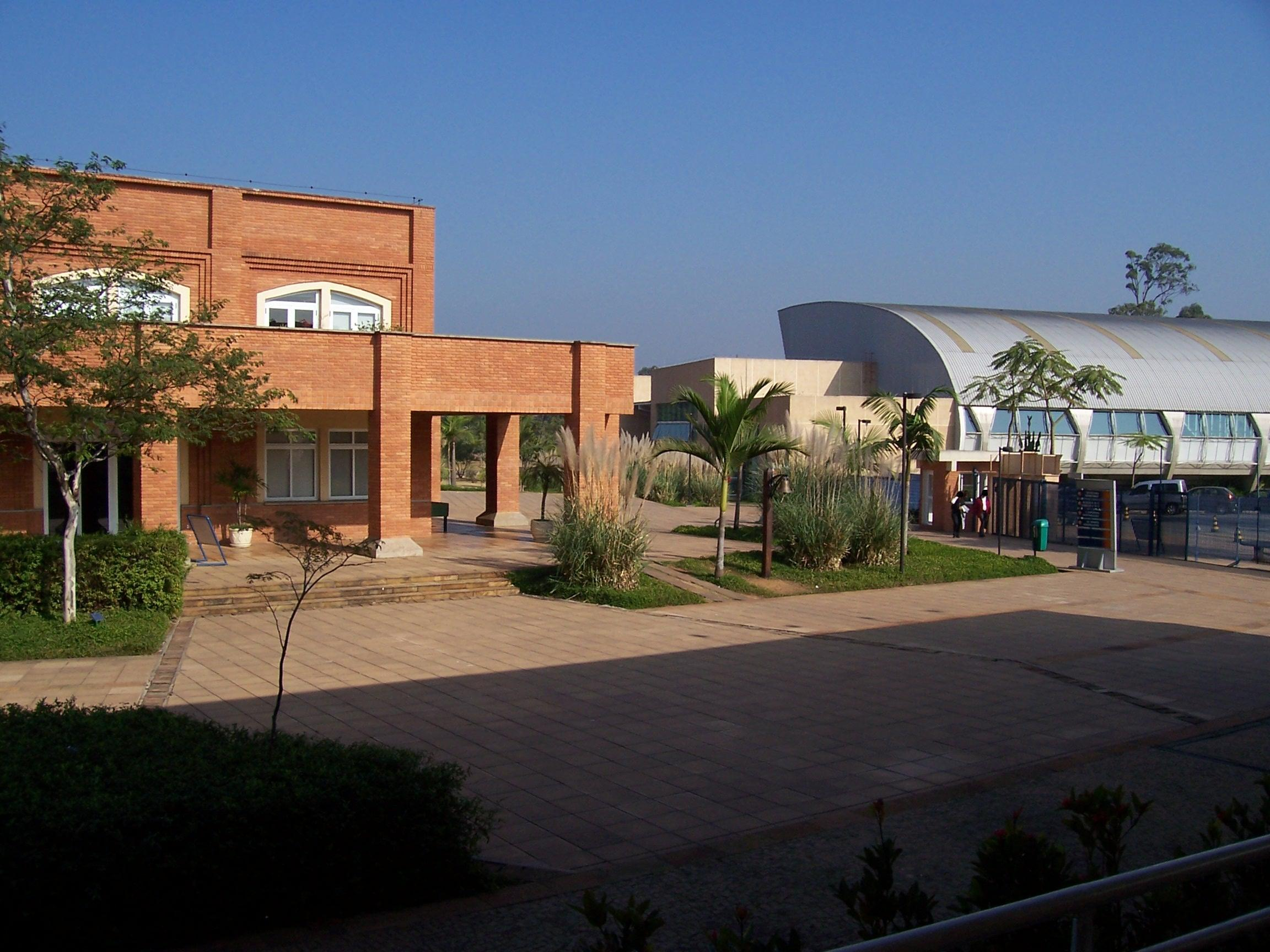
Colégio Humboldt São Paulo

Colégio Humboldt São Paulo, a German international school, is located in Interlagos.

== See also ==
- Roman Catholic Diocese of Santo Amaro
- Autodrómo José Carlos Pace
