= TV Globo São Paulo =

Television station in São Paulo, Brazil

TV Globo São Paulo (ZYB 850)
- São Paulo; Brazil
- Channels: Digital: 18 (UHF); Virtual: 5
- Branding: Globo São Paulo

Programming
- Affiliations: TV Globo

Ownership
- Owner: Grupo Globo; (Globo Comunicação e Participações S/A)
- Sister stations: CBN São Paulo

History
- First air date: March 14, 1952
- Former call signs: ZYE 88
- Former names: TV Paulista (1952–1967); TV Globo Paulista (1967–1968); TV Globo São Paulo (1968–1976); Rede Globo São Paulo (1976–2021)
- Former channel numbers: Analog: 5 (VHF, 1952-2017)

Technical information
- Licensing authority: ANATEL
- ERP: 18 kW
- Transmitter coordinates: 23°34′4.01″S 46°39′0″W

Links
- Public license information: Profile
- Website: redeglobo.globo.com/sao-paulo

TV Globo São Paulo (channel 5) is a Brazilian television station based in São Paulo, Brazil carrying TV Globo for the metropolitan area and Ibiúna, outside of Mogi das Cruzes, which is served by TV Diário. Owned-and-operated by Globo, a subsidiary of Grupo Globo, its production and journalism studios are in the Vila Cordeiro neighborhood, in addition to the commercial and administrative offices, located in the Edifício Jornalista Roberto Marinho, on the same block, and its transmitters are in the Torre da Globo, at the top of the Trianon Corporate Building, in Espigão da Paulista. It is the oldest television station in operation in Brazil and alongside TV Globo Rio, it is one of the network's flagship stations.

The station was opened in 1952 as TV Paulista, having been the second television station to operate in São Paulo, after TV Tupi. Created by federal deputy Oswaldo Ortiz Monteiro together with three developers, it began by showing shows and news produced in improvised studios in a residential building in the Consolação neighborhood. In 1955, with difficulties due to a crisis, part of its shares were sold to the group of radio presenter Victor Costa, expanding with the purchase of radio and television stations throughout Brazil, which increased investments in programming and hiring artists.

After Costa died in 1959, his son Victor Costa Júnior took control of TV Paulista, which again went through a crisis, causing him to sell the station and other radio and television concessions to journalist and businessman Roberto Marinho in May 1965. The acquisition made the station a subsidiary of TV Globo, in Rio de Janeiro, at the same time that a gradual process of changing the name of the Rio station took place. In 1968, with its headquarters, previously transferred to the Vila Buarque neighborhood, hit by a fire, it moved to Praça Marechal Deodoro, where it began to produce, as co-generator of the network, news, sports and entertainment programs. In 1999, it moved to its current address.

== History ==
=== TV Paulista ===
The station was inaugurated on March 14, 1952, as TV Paulista, in a ceremony led by Vera Nunes. It was the second television station to go on air in São Paulo (the third overall station in Brazil) and the first in the country not to belong to Assis Chateubriand's Diários Associados. The first program shown on channel 5 was the telenovela Helena (with only 10 chapters), which aired minutes after the inauguration. The station was created by deputy Oswaldo Ortiz Monteiro, who "passed" control of the station in 1955 to the Victor Costa Organization.

TV Paulista was the smallest television station (in terms of physical space) in São Paulo: its headquarters were limited to a small apartment in the Liège Building, at Rua da Consolação, 2570, and the studios were set up in the garage and in a space for a store on the ground floor of the same building. The kitchen was the development laboratory, and the writing of texts and newscasts took place in the living room. Shortly afterwards, TV Paulista moved to Rua das Palmeiras, in the Santa Cecília neighborhood.

Important names in Brazilian television were part of the station, such as Hebe Camargo and Silvio Santos. From 1959 to 1961, the station's artistic director was Mario Brasini, who wrote and directed the soap opera "Laura" and the programs: "A alma das Graças", "Estampas Eucalol", "Teledrama 3 Leões", "Boa Noite, Carmela", among others. It was also on TV Paulista that Silvio Santos launched himself as a presenter, with the program Vamos Brincar de Forca.

Between 1957 and 1966, TV Paulista maintained station affiliations in the interior of São Paulo. These were TV Santos, between 1957 and 1960, and TV Bauru, between 1960 and 1966. Facing a serious crisis, TV Paulista was acquired by Roberto Marinho in May 1965. In December 1965, director Roberto Montoro was appointed, who began the transition.

The programming was restructured so that the station could begin the integration process with TV Globo Rio de Janeiro, and works began on the facilities. The buildings were used to found Globo's news center in São Paulo. At first, channel 5 operated as a kind of affiliate of the Rio station.

=== TV Globo São Paulo ===
On March 24, 1967, the name TV Paulista was abandoned and the station was renamed TV Globo Paulista. On March 24, 1968, after the transition, its name was changed again, this time to TV Globo São Paulo.

After a fire in the building where it was based, in 1969, TV Globo São Paulo was transferred to separate studios at Praça Marechal Deodoro, 340 and Avenida Angélica, 424, in the same neighborhood, a rented property where it remained for thirty years and where productions were made, including programs such as TV Mulher, Balão Mágico, Globo Rural and Jornal da Globo (the latter from 1993). In 1970, TV Globo had a commercial office on Rua Canadá, in Jardim América, which was later transferred to Alameda Santos, where Galeria Arte Global also operated.

On December 9, 1977, the station's license was renewed for a further fifteen years.

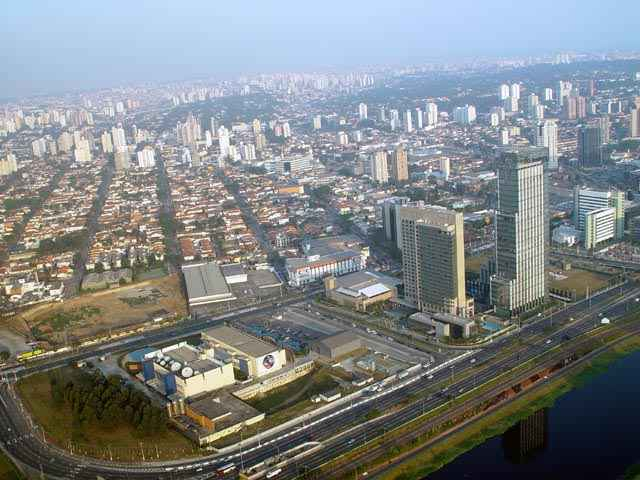
The station's facilities in 2002.

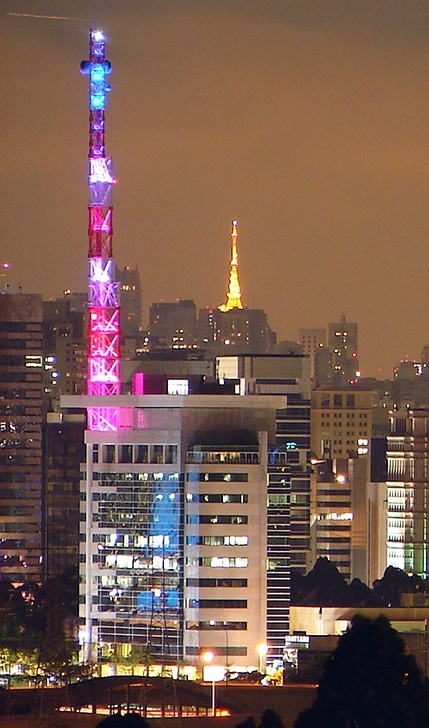
Edifício Jornalista Roberto Marinho, in 2009.

On January 29, 1999, the broadcaster moved to two new medium-sized buildings specially designed and built to generate journalism and entertainment, at Avenida Doutor Chucri Zaidan, 46, in the Vila Cordeiro neighborhood. Journalism now has two 400 m² studios, in addition to the large newsroom without walls that became the setting for Jornal da Globo. Jornal Hoje also began to be produced in São Paulo (remaining in the studio until July 2001). The inauguration was attended by authorities, including the then President of the Republic Fernando Henrique Cardoso, accompanied by the then president of the National Congress, federal deputy Antônio Carlos Magalhães, as well as state ministers and other guests.

In October of the same year, Mais Você debuted, generated from São Paulo until February 2008, when it was transferred to Projac in Rio de Janeiro, returning to São Paulo in February 2021. Later, the concert studio was inaugurated with 600 m² for recording Programa do Jô and later Altas Horas. In January 2004, some of the Domingão do Faustão programs began to be recorded in São Paulo, on alternate Sundays.

On April 26, 2007, the broadcaster opened the Edifício Jornalista Roberto Marinho next to its studios, transferring its commercial sector from the old office located on Alameda Santos. The new building houses on its top floor a panoramic studio with views of the Octávio Frias de Oliveira Bridge, which has been used since May 12, 2008 for the station's local news programs and Bom Dia Brasil.

In December 2021, Globo underwent a financial restructuring that resulted in the sale of its facilities in São Paulo to Vinci Partners. The transaction value was R$522 million. As part of the agreement, Globo also established a lease agreement with the new owners. The contract, with an initial duration of 15 years and the possibility of extension for another 15 years, stipulates a monthly rent of more than R$4.7 million (totaling R$57 million annually). As a result, Globo became a tenant in its old facilities, which can now also be rented by other tenants.

In May 2023, the station underwent an internal restructuring that resulted in the dismissal of 20 employees as part of a strategy to contain expenses and balance its finances. Areas affected by this measure included technology, operations, sports and news.

== Technical information ==
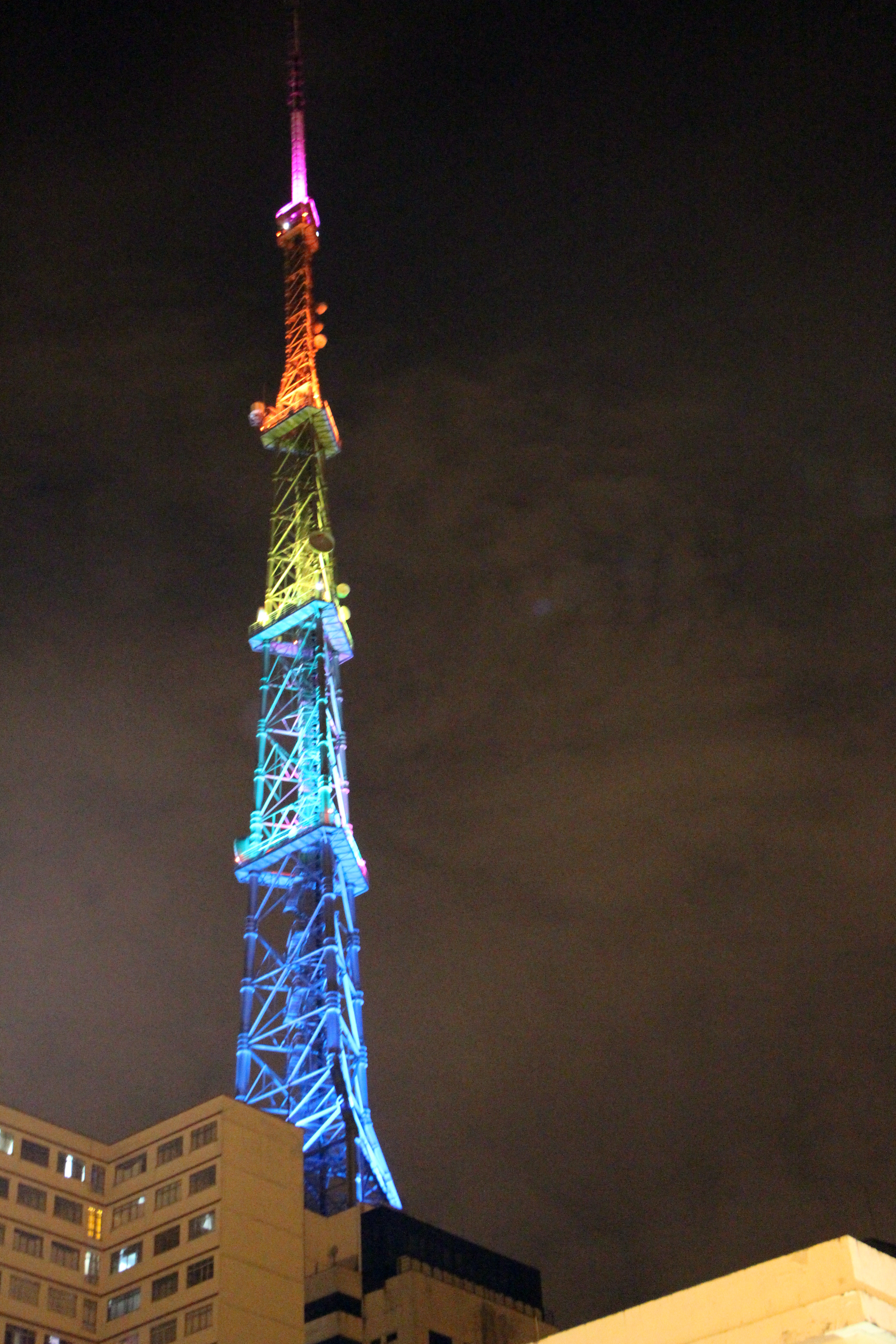
Digital tower of the station, atop Edifício Trianon Corporate, in 2013.

=== Subchannels ===
Channel	Video	Aspect	Short name	Programming
5.1	1080i	16:9	TV Globo	Main TV Globo São Paulo programming / TV Globo

TV Globo São Paulo began its digital transmissions on December 2, 2007, the day digital television was launched in Brazil, on channel 18 UHF. For the new technology, the broadcaster built a new tower on top of the Trianon Corporate Building, in Espigão da Paulista, which contains special lighting with a color spectrum equal to that of the network's logo. On November 11, 2013, local news programs began to be shown in high definition.

=== Analog-to-digital conversion ===
Globo São Paulo discontinued its analog signal over VHF channel 5, on March 29, 2017, complying an order by ANATEL regarding the shutdown of analog television in metropolitan São Paulo. The signal was switched off at 11:59 pm, during Big Brother Brasil.

== Awards ==
Vladimir Herzog Award

Year	Category	Work	Author	Result	Ref.
2014	Reportagem de TV (Menção Honrosa)	"Tortura na Fundação Casa"	Valmir Salaro and team	Won	
2016	Reportagem de TV	"Chacina em Osasco"	Monica Pinheiro	Won	
2017	Vídeo	"Quem sou eu?"	Bruno Della Latta, Cláudio Guterres, Nunuca Vieira e Renata Ceribelli	Won	
2019	Vídeo	"70 anos da Declaração Universal dos Direitos Humanos – conquistas e fracassos"	Betina Anton, Renata Ribeiro, Rodrigo Alvarez, Ilze Scamparini, Carlos Gil, Tiago Eltz, Rômulo Nunes, Adejair Graciano, Cláudio Perricelli, Gabriel Larangeira, Diogo Dubiella, Marcos Aidar, Kunihiro Otsuka, Fabio Sermonti, Mario Câmera, Felippe Coaglio, Franklin Feitosa, Maurizio della Constanza, Chris Kosta, Jeferson Ferreira	Won	

== Controversies ==
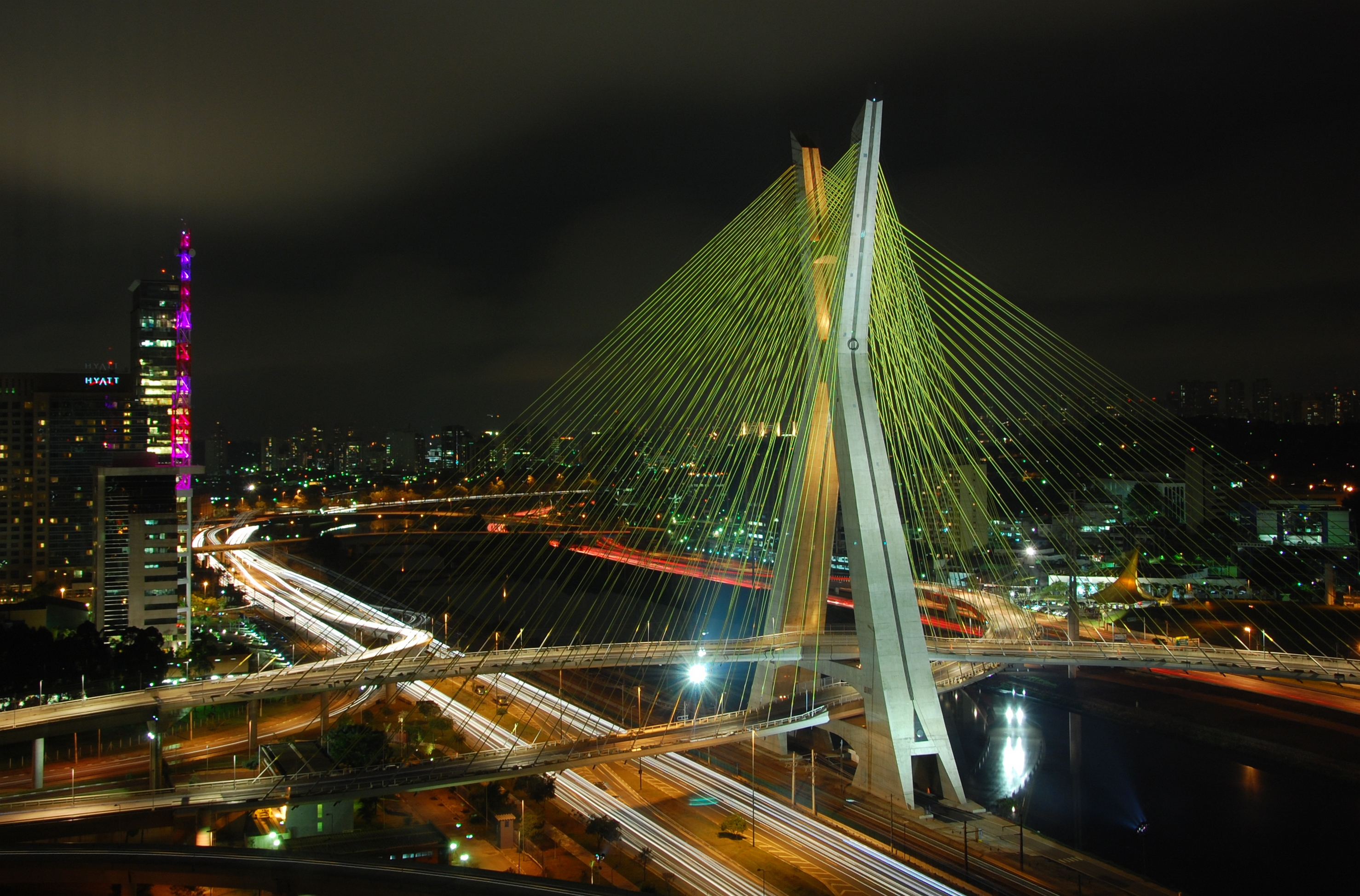
Octávio Frias de Oliveira Bridge, which serves as the scenery of the station's local newscasts in the panoramic studio

On January 29, 1999, during the inauguration of the new headquarters of TV Globo São Paulo, which was attended by the entire government leadership, Marluce Dias da Silva, Rede Globo's main executive, harshly criticized the secretary of human rights, José Gregori, from the FHC Government:

At no point is Rede Globo able to think about the possibility of any type of external or governmental control in relation to TV programming.

— Marluce Silva

The criticism was made a few days after Gregori announced that the government intended to implement an age rating control model in schedules that would even include censorship of the television press, in which this model proposed at the beginning of the second FHC government clearly disrespected the imposed legislation by the 1988 Constitution. At the time, FHC was accused of wanting to pressure Brazilian TV networks, with the aim of not showing negative news about his government in terms of the economy and cases of violence.

In 2001, the heirs of the station's founder Oswaldo Ortiz Monteiro attempted to legally reverse the sale of TV Paulista to Roberto Marinho, alleging that the transfer of the station to the Organizations Victor Costa would never have been regularized - that is, Victor Costa Junior would have sold to Roberto Marinho something that was not legally his. They further alleged that there were 673 minority shareholders, who together held 48% of the company's capital, and that they had been harmed - since Roberto Marinho had appropriated their shares in an "irregular" manner in 1975, declaring them "dead" or "missing persons" in the corporate re-registration. After turbulent legal proceedings, Ortiz Monteiro's estate lost in all judicial instances and on August 24, 2010, the Superior Court of Justice (STJ) considered the purchase of TV Paulista by Roberto Marinho to be valid. The Ortiz family filed an appeal with the Federal Supreme Court (STF), which, however, was not accepted.
