= Colégio Humboldt São Paulo =

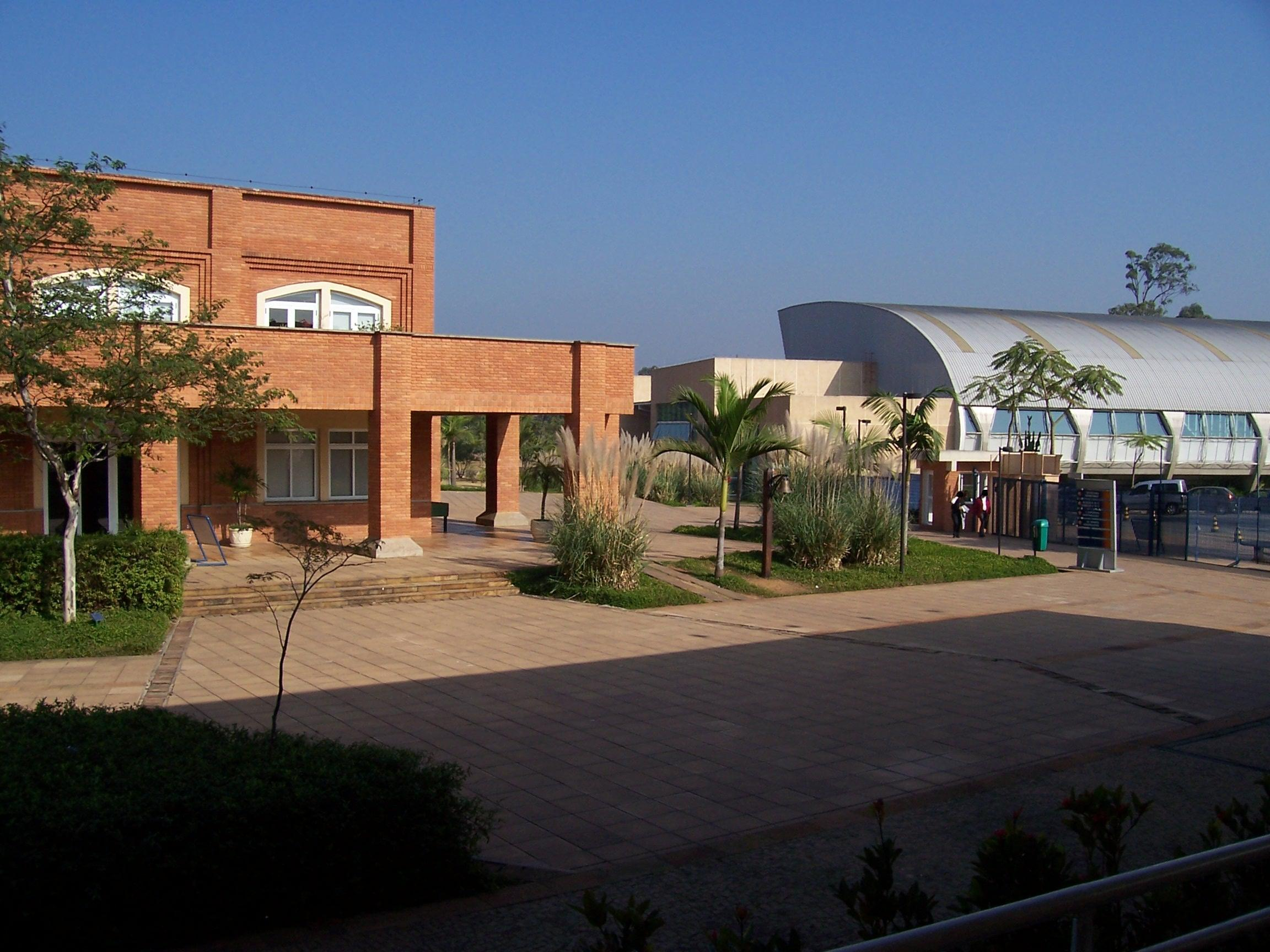

Location
- Av. Eng. Alberto Kuhlmann, 525 · Interlagos · 04784-010 · São Paulo; São Paulo, São Paulo; Brazil
- Coordinates: 23.6872°S 46.7097°W

Information
- Type: International school
- Website: humboldt.com.br

Colégio Humboldt São Paulo is a German international school in the Interlagos neighborhood of São Paulo, São Paulo, Brazil. The school serves infant school through the final year of secondary school.

== History ==
The German school first opened on May 1, 1916; the impetus came during a May 13, 1916 meeting at the Lindau Bakery. Ginasio Humboldt Santo Amaro was previously in Santo Amaro, São Paulo. The school received its current name, Colégio Humboldt, in 1966, after its Oberstufe opened. The current campus in Interlagos opened in 1999.

== See also ==
- German Brazilian

Phone Contact :11 5686-4055
