= Traffic Group =

Traffic Assessoria e Comunicações Ltda.
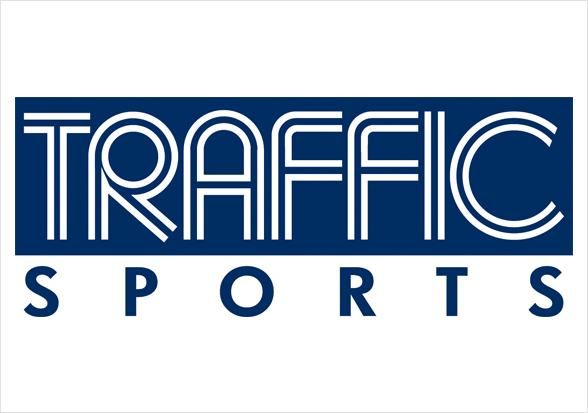
- Trade name: Traffic Sports
- Type: Private
- Industry: Sport
- Founded: Brazil, 1970s
- Headquarters: São Paulo, Brazil
- Area served: South America, North America, Europe, Asia
- Key people: José Hawilla (former owner and founder)
- Services: Sports Event Management; Television production
- Subsidiaries: Traffic Sports USA; Traffic Sports Europe

Traffic Group is a sports event management company founded in Brazil, headquartered in São Paulo.

== History ==
Traffic Group holds the television rights to a number of association football matches in the Americas including Copa América, Copa Libertadores, Copa Sudamericana, South American Under-17 Football Championship, South American Under-20 Football Championship, Brazil home World Cup qualifiers, CONCACAF World Cup qualifiers CONMEBOL Olympic qualifying tournaments and UNCAF tournaments as well as the English FA Cup, England home games and the Africa Cup of Nations.

Traffic Group also owns the rights to other sports events such as basketball and golf. Other holdings of the group include at least one Rede Globo affiliates in Brazil (TV TEM) and its own television production facility, Tv7.

Traffic Group has regional offices in the United States (Miami, Florida - Traffic Sports USA) and Europe (Lisbon, Portugal and Amsterdam, Netherlands - Traffic Sports Europe). Through Traffic Football Management, three football clubs are part of the group: Desportivo Brasil, based in Porto Feliz, Brazil, founded in 2005, Estoril Praia, based in Portugal, and American NASL side Fort Lauderdale Strikers, founded in 2011.
