= SPTV (program) =

- Created by: Rodrigo Ayala
- Presented by: Alan Severiano (SP1); José Roberto Burnier (SP2)
- Country of origin: Brazil
- Original language: Portuguese

Production
- Producer: Ali Kamel
- Editor: Ali Kamel
- Camera setup: Multi-camera
- Running time: 75 minutes (SP1); 30 minutes (SP2); 10 minutes (SP3)
- Production company: Central Globo de Jornalismo

Original release
- Network: TV Globo São Paulo
- Release: January 3, 1983 – present

Related
- Bom Dia São Paulo

SPTV, also known as SP1 (first edition), SP2 (second edition) and SP3 (third edition; 1983-1989), is a Brazilian local television news program produced and broadcast by TV Globo São Paulo for its coverage area. It is interspersed with TV Globo's national programming in its two editions, dedicated to Praça TV, a block of local journalism produced by the network's broadcasters and affiliates, airing from Monday to Saturday, at 11:45 am and 7:10 pm. Its coverage includes news, public services, community campaigns, and daily information such as traffic conditions and weather forecasts in the São Paulo Metropolitan Region.

== History ==
=== 1983–1990 ===
The first edition of SPTV debuted on January 3, 1983, replacing Globo Cor Especial (no. 2 timeslot), and the second edition on July 2 of the same year, replacing the local block of Jornal das Sete. At the time, each edition was only ten minutes long, divided into three segments. For a short period, between 1983 and 1989, it had three editions.

=== 1990–1996 ===
It was replaced on July 9, 1990, by São Paulo Já, which served as a test for a new format called Praça Já intended to replace the Praça TV format, though the concept was never adopted outside São Paulo. Its main intention was to strengthen local news and increase the live participation of reporting teams. The programme was a pioneer on Globo, featuring six bulletins that replaced Globo Cidade and aired throughout the afternoon with Carlos Nascimento as anchor. It was the first local news programme to include national and international news during the Praça TV 1st edition slot, as it occupied the Jornal Hoje time period in the afternoon.

The first edition covered local and interior news, in addition to national and international events. The second presented a summary of the day's facts and short news, only with state issues. São Paulo Já tried to give the same importance to the subjects, but sought an accessible language, with space for relaxation.

Until April 9, 1994, SP already broadcast news in this format; as of 11 April, a Monday, Jornal Hoje returned to São Paulo, and SP began generating news only for the metropolitan region of São Paulo, with independent editions on affiliates such as Oeste Paulista. Each edition lasted half an hour, consistent with other local news programmes across the Globo network. The justification for this return was that Jornal Hoje had got the formula right for the female audience in the afternoon.

Carlos Nascimento presented the newscast in a classic anchor style, delivering the news, conducting live interviews, and liaising with reporters to ensure editorial consistency. Augusto Xavier shared the news presentation with Carlos. It was the first Globo newscast to invest heavily in weather forecasting, which later became standardized across the network's newscasts.

In the first year of the news program, Silvana Teixeira, former presenter of the children's show Bambalalão, became a weather forecast columnist, delivering forecasts in a relaxed tone, wearing a raincoat on rainy days and a coat on cold days. The data, graphics and images used in the table were provided by the National Institute for Space Research (INPE), in the São Paulo city of São José dos Campos.

With the return of Jornal Hoje to national television in April 1994, the first edition of São Paulo Já began airing at 12:45 pm, lasting half an hour and focusing on community issues. It was anchored by Carlos Tramontina. Carlos Nascimento remained in charge of the news only in the second edition, shown at 7:45 pm.

On February 10, 1995, SP Já made a special one-hour edition, shown instead of the Globo Repórter program for the entire state of São Paulo, because of the rain calamity in the São Paulo capital. The edition was presented by Carlos Nascimento, and was unique in the history of television news.

=== Since 1996 ===
On April 1, 1996, SPTV returned to the air and returned completely reformulated and redesigned in two longer editions with different focuses: the first focused on providing services in the community and the second with information about the main events of the day. On May 12, 2008, SPTV adopted, along with other local television news programs in São Paulo, such as Bom Dia São Paulo and Antena Paulista, a panoramic studio. Located on the top floor of the Edifício Jornalista Roberto Marinho, in the neighborhood of Vila Cordeiro, close to Brooklin, it is possible to see the Octavio Frias de Oliveira cable-stayed bridge, Marginal Pinheiros and the Centro Empresarial Nações Unidas in the glass background of the newscast.

On May 8, 2017, the respective two editions of SPTV were renamed SP1 (1st Edition) and SP2 (2nd Edition), maintaining the name SPTV during a transition process, in addition to receiving a reformulation that was also applied to Bom Dia São Paulo. These changes included modifications to the GCs and vignettes and the insertion of a clock, the temperature of all cities in the metropolitan region of the city of São Paulo, in addition to headlines on the screen. The removal of "TV" from the news nomenclature was because, in the opinion of the broadcaster's journalism management, the news program would be a multiplatform product, as it would also be available on other devices such as smartphones, tablets and computers.
