= Vladimir Herzog Award =

Brazilian journalism award

- Awarded for: Brazilian Journalism Award for Amnesty and Human Rights Coverage
- Date: October 27, 1979
- Location: Theater of the Catholic University of São Paulo
- Country: Brazil
- First award: 1979
- Final award: 2011
- Website: www.premiovladimirherzog.org.br

Vladimir Herzog Award (Portuguese: Prêmio Jornalistico Vladimir Herzog de Anistia e Direitos Humanos) is a Brazilian award for journalists who excel in the coverage of human rights issues in the national press. It was created in 1979 by the Journalists Sindicate of São Paulo.

== History ==
The Vladimir Herzog Award for Human Rights was established in 1977, two years after the murder of journalist Vladimir Herzog in the dungeons of dictatorship, in order to encourage journalists in a time of strong censorship, to denounce the abuses that were committed then.

Today, the award continues its mission, rewarding stories that stimulate the quest for citizenship, denouncing all kinds of violation of human rights.

== Categories ==
Every year, the ten categories are:

- Arts
- Photography
- Book-Report
- Radio Report
- Internet Reporting
- TV – Picture
- TV – (Documentary)
- TV – Report (daily news)
- Magazine
- Newspaper
