= List of Sistema Brasileiro de Televisão affiliates =

This is a list that contains the owned-and-operated and affiliated stations that retransmit programming from Sistema Brasileiro de Televisão (SBT). In addition, the list also contains pay TV operators that have the network's signal in their line-up and the network's former affiliates and their respective affiliations or current situations.

== Owned-and-operated stations ==
=== Head station ===
| Station | City | State | Channel | Callsign | Operated since |
|---|---|---|---|---|---|
| SBT São Paulo | Osasco / São Paulo | São Paulo | 4 (28) | ZYB 855 | 1981 |

=== Other stations ===
| Station | City | State | Channel | Callsign | Operated since |
|---|---|---|---|---|---|
| SBT Central | Jaú | São Paulo | 12 (24) | ZYQ 837 | 1983 |
| SBT RP | Ribeirão Preto | São Paulo | 5 (24) | ZYQ 839 | 1988 |
| SBT Rio | Rio de Janeiro | Rio de Janeiro | 11 (24) | ZYB 512 | 1976 (Note: It began operating in May 1976 as TV Studios Silvio Santos, being the network's first broadcaster before the concession occurred 5 years later) |
| SBT Interior RJ | Nova Friburgo | Rio de Janeiro | 3 (24) | ZYB 517 | 1982 |
| SBT Brasília | Brasília | Distrito Federal | 12 (24) | ZYP 306 | 1986 |
| SBT RS | Porto Alegre | Rio Grande do Sul | 5 (28) | ZYB 618 | 1981 |
| SBT Pará | Belém | Pará | 5 (26) | ZYP 292 | 1981 |

== Affiliates ==
=== Acre ===
| Grupo | Station | City | Analog channel | Digital channel | Callsign | Affiliate since |
|---|---|---|---|---|---|---|
| Grupo Norte de Comunicação | TV Norte Acre | Rio Branco | —N/a | 22 | ZYP 322 | 2022 |
| Grupo James Camelli de Comunicação | TV Juruá | Cruzeiro do Sul | —N/a | 10 (44) | RTV | 2009 |
| - | TV Brasiléia | Brasiléia | 7 | 41 | RTV | 2025 |
| - | TV Sena Madureira | Sena Madureira | 5 | 29 | RTV | 2025 |
| - | SBT Xapuri | Xapuri | 5 | 29 | RTV | 2025 |
| - | SBT Tarauacá | Tarauacá | 5 | 29 | RTV | 2025 |

=== Alagoas ===
| Grupo | Station | City | Channel | Callsign | Affiliate since |
|---|---|---|---|---|---|
| Sistema Opinião de Comunicação | TV Ponta Verde | Maceió | 5 (19) | ZYA 220 | 2010 (Note: Also affiliated to the network between 1982 and 1986 and later between 2007 and 2009.) |

=== Amapá ===
| Grupo | Station | City | Analog channel | Digital channel | Callsign | Affiliate since |
|---|---|---|---|---|---|---|
| Organizações José Alcolumbre | TV Amazônia | Macapá | —N/a | 13 (36) | ZYA 287 | 2000 |
| Organizações José Alcolumbre | TV Ferreira Gomes | Ferreira Gomes | 5 | 10 (36) | RTV | No information |
| Organizações José Alcolumbre | TV Serra do Navio | Serra do Navio | 7 | 36 | RTV | No information |
| Ministério Verdade | TV Verdade | Laranja do Jari | 7 | 38 | RTV | 1995 |
| Ministério Verdade | TV Ramalho | Vitória do Jari | —N/a | —N/a | RTV | No information |

=== Amazonas ===
| Grupo | Station | City | Analog channel | Digital channel | Callsign | Affiliate since |
|---|---|---|---|---|---|---|
| Grupo Norte de Comunicação | TV Norte Amazonas | Manaus | —N/a | 10 (34) | ZYA 250 | 2007 |
| Grupo Norte de Comunicação | TV Norte Parintins | Parintins | 22 | 34 | RTV | 2010 |
| Grupo Norte de Comunicação | TV Norte Presidente Figueiredo | Presidente Figueiredo | 10 | 38 | RTV | 2026 |

=== Bahia ===
| Grupo | Station | City | Channel | Callsign | Affiliate since |
|---|---|---|---|---|---|
| Grupo Aratu | TV Aratu | Salvador | 4 (25) | ZYA 296 | 1997 |

=== Ceará ===
| Grupo | Station | City | Channel | Callsign | Affiliate since |
|---|---|---|---|---|---|
| Jangadeiro | TV Jangadeiro | Fortaleza | 12 (35) | ZYA 430 | 2015 (Note: Also affiliated between 1999 and 2012.) |

=== Espírito Santo ===
| Grupo | Station | City | Channel | Callsign | Affiliate since |
|---|---|---|---|---|---|
| Rede SIM | TV SIM | Vitória | 10 (49) | ZYP 601 | 2025 |

=== Goiás ===
| Grupo | Station | City | Channel | Callsign | Affiliate since |
|---|---|---|---|---|---|
| Serra Dourada Comunicações | TV Serra Dourada | Goiânia | 9 (20) | ZYA 576 | 1989 |

=== Maranhão ===
| Grupo | Station | City | Analog channel | Digital channel | Callsign | Affiliate since |
|---|---|---|---|---|---|---|
| Sistema Difusora de Comunicação | TV Difusora São Luís | São Luís | —N/a | 4 (38) | ZYP 325 | 1991 |
| Sistema Difusora de Comunicação | TV Difusora Sul | Imperatriz | —N/a | 7 (38) | ZYP 143 | 1989 |
| Sistema Difusora de Comunicação | TV Difusora Leste | Caxias | 11 | 38 | RTV | 2015 (Note: Also affiliated between 2004 and 2014.) |
| Sistema Difusora de Comunicação | TV Difusora Bacabal | Bacabal | —N/a | 2 | RTV | No information |
| Sistema Difusora de Comunicação | TV Difusora Presidente Durta | Presidente Dutra | —N/a | 9 | RTV | No information |
| Sistema Difusora de Comunicação | TV Difusora Balsas | Balsas | —N/a | 3 | RTV | No information |
| Sistema Difusora de Comunicação | TV Difusora Miardor | Mirador | —N/a | 3 | RTV | 2022 |
| Sistema Difusora de Comunicação | TV Difusora Amarante | Amarante do Maranhão | 13 | 11 | RTV | 1998 |
| Sistema Difusora de Comunicação | TV Difusora São Mateus | São Mateus do Maranhão | —N/a | 9 | RTV | No information |
| Sistema Difusora de Comunicação | TV Difusora Lago da Pedra | Lago da Pedra | 12 | 12 | RTV | No information |
| Sistema Difusora de Comunicação | TV Difusora Santa Helena | Santa Helena | —N/a | 4 | RTV | 2026 |
| Sistema Difusora de Comunicação | TV Sucesso | Turilândia | —N/a | 4 (29) | RTV | No information |
| Sistema Difusora de Comunicação | TV CN | Coelho Neto | —N/a | 8 | RTV | No information |
| Sistema Difusora de Comunicação | TV Moderna | Rosário | —N/a | 44 | RTV | 2022 |
| Sistema Difusora de Comunicação | Buriti TV (TV Difusora Buriticupu) | Buriticupu | —N/a | 2 | RTV | No information |
| Sistema Difusora de Comunicação | TV Difusora Açailândia | Açailândia | 8 | 8 | RTV | No information |
| Sistema Difusora de Comunicação | TV Difusora Grajaú | Grajaú | 13 | 13 | RTV | No information |
| Sistema Difusora de Comunicação | TV Difusora Coroatá (TV Rio Itapecuru) | Coroatá | —N/a | 9 | RTV | 2011 |
| Sistema Difusora de Comunicação | TV Difusora Itapecuru | Itapecuru Mirim | —N/a | 6 | RTV | 2023 |
| Sistema Difusora de Comunicação | TV Difusora Pedreiras | Pedreiras | 9 | 9 | RTV | No information |
| Sistema Difusora de Comunicação | TV Difusora Pinheiro | Pinheiro | —N/a | 3 | RTV | No information |
| Sistema Difusora de Comunicação | TV Difusora Santa Inês | Santa Inês | —N/a | 5 | RTV | No information |
| Sistema Difusora de Comunicação | TV Difusora São João dos Patos | São João dos Patos | 9 | 6 | RTV | No information |
| Sistema Difusora de Comunicação | TV Difusora Tutóia | Tutóia | —N/a | 7 | RTV | No information |
| Sistema Centro Norte de Comunicação | TV Centro Norte | Presidente Dutra | 9 | 38 | RTV | 2010 |
| Grupo FC Oliveira | FC TV | Codó | 3 | 41 | RTV | 2008 |
| Sistema Maranhão Norte de Telecomunicações Ltda. | TV Rio Parnaíba | Barão de Grajaú | 12 | 36 | RTV | 2023 |
| Sistema Abreu de Comunicação | TV Líder | Vargem Grande | 7 | —N/a | RTV | 2015 (Note: Also affiliated between 2005 and 2010.) |

=== Mato Grosso ===
| Grupo | Station | City | Analog channel | Digital channel | Callsign | Affiliate since |
|---|---|---|---|---|---|---|
| Grupo Roberto Dorner de Comunicação | SBT Cuiabá | Cuiabá | —N/a | 5 (45) | RTV | 2009 |
| Grupo Roberto Dorner de Comunicação | SBT Nova Mutum | Nova Mutum | —N/a | 9 (45) | RTV | 2018 |
| Grupo Roberto Dorner de Comunicação | SBT Rondonópolis | Rondonópolis | —N/a | 8 (45) | ZYQ 728 | 2009 |
| Grupo Roberto Dorner de Comunicação | SBT Sinop | Sinop | —N/a | 4 (48) | RTV | 2009 |
| Grupo Roberto Dorner de Comunicação | SBT Poconé | Poconé | 7 | 46 | RTV | 2022 |
| Grupo Roberto Dorner de Comunicação | SBT Marcelândia | Marcelândia | —N/a | 8 (45) | RTV | 2023 |
| Grupo Roberto Dorner de Comunicação | SBT Aripuanã | Aripuanã | —N/a | 8 (45) | RTV | 2023 |
| Grupo Roberto Dorner de Comunicação | Bem TV | Tangará da Serra | —N/a | 3 (14) | RTV | 2009 |
| Grupo Roberto Dorner de Comunicação | TVCO | Barra do Garças | 4 | 28 | RTV | 1990 |
| Grupo Roberto Dorner de Comunicação | TV Centro-Oeste | Pontes e Lacerda | —N/a | 6 (40) | RTV | 1999 |
| Grupo Roberto Dorner de Comunicação | SBT Colíder | Colíder | —N/a | 13 (48) | RTV | 1996 |
| Grupo Roberto Dorner de Comunicação | SBT Sorriso | Sorriso | —N/a | 6 (46) | RTV | 2009 |
| TV Descalvados Ltda. | TV Descalvados | Cáceres | —N/a | 8 (45) | RTV | 1995 |
| Grupo UNIFAMA | SBT Guarantã do Norte | Guarantã do Norte | —N/a | 5 (23) | RTV | 2025 |
| Grupo RS | SBT Sapezal | Sapezal | —N/a | 10 (45) | RTV | 2025 |
| Grupo Conti de Comunicação | TV Ourominas | Matupá | —N/a | 6 (48) | RTV | No information |
| Grupo Mirassol | TV Mirassol | Mirassol d'Oeste | 13 | —N/a | RTV | No information |
| Grupo Água Boa | TV Bugres | Barra do Bugres | 11 | —N/a | RTV | No information |
| Grupo Araguaia Xingu de Comunicação | TV Centro Norte | Confresa | —N/a | 21 | RTV | 2020 |
| Sistema Nortão de Radiodifusão | TV Nortão | Alta Floresta | —N/a | 5 (18) | RTV | 1992 |
| Grupo Real | TV Real | Campo Verde | 7 | 51 | RTV | 1993 |
| Tupi Comunicações | SBT Lucas | Lucas do Rio Verde | 8 | 49 | RTV | 2016 |
| Grupo Matogrossense de Comunicação | SBT Itiquira | Itiquira | —N/a | 11 (30) | RTV | No information |
| —N/a | TV Cidade | Nova Xavantina | —N/a | 9 (39) | RTV | 1991 |
| Grupo Agora MT | TV Cidade | Jaciara | —N/a | 13 (17) | RTV | 1996 |
| TV Veja News Ltda. | TV Noroeste | Juína | —N/a | 7 (19) | RTV | 2020 |
| TV Chapadão Ltda. | TV Divisa | Alto Araguaia | —N/a | 44 | RTV | —N/a |

=== Mato Grosso do Sul ===
| Grupo | Station | City | Channel | Callsign | Affiliate since |
|---|---|---|---|---|---|
| Fundação Internacional de Comunicação | SBT MS | Campo Grande | 8 (28) | ZYP 310 | 1981 |
| Grupo Matogrossense de Comunicação - GMT | SBT Sonora | Sonora | 11 | RTV | No information |

=== Minas Gerais ===
| Grupo | Station | City | Analog channel | Digital channel | Callsign | Affiliate since |
|---|---|---|---|---|---|---|
| Diários Associados | TV Alterosa Belo Horizonte | Belo Horizonte | —N/a | 5 (36) | ZYP 266 | 1981 |
| Diários Associados | TV Alterosa Centro-Oeste | Divinópolis | —N/a | 10 (34) | ZYP 291 | 2002 |
| Diários Associados | TV Alterosa Leste (Note: License owned by Grupo Silvio Santos, administered by Diários Associados.) | Manhuaçu / Governador Valadares | 27 | 38 / 13 (38) | ZYA 771 | 2011 |
| Diários Associados | TV Alterosa Sul de Minas | Varginha | 4 | 23 | ZYA 739 | 1994 |
| Diários Associados | TV Alterosa Zona da Mata | Juiz de Fora | —N/a | 10 (32) | ZYP 283 | 1999 (Note: Also affiliated between 1990 and 1994.) |
| Rede Vitoriosa de Comunicações | TV Vitoriosa | Ituiutaba / Uberlândia | 3 | 32 / 2 (32) | ZYA 733 | 1989 |

=== Pará ===
| Grupo | Station | City | Analog channel | Digital channel | Callsign | Affiliate since |
|---|---|---|---|---|---|---|
| Rede de Televisão Paraense Ltda. | TV Paraense | Castanhal | —N/a | 3 (25) | RTV | 2002 |
| Sistema Floresta de Comunicação/FC Comunicações | TV Floresta | Tucuruí | —N/a | 12 (27) | RTV | 1982 |
| Sistema Floresta de Comunicação/FC Comunicações | SBT Capanema | Capanema | —N/a | 26 | RTV | No information |
| Sistema Floresta de Comunicação/FC Comunicações | IMO TV Jacareacanga | Jacareacanga | 11 | 46 | RTV | 2026 |
| Sistema Floresta de Comunicação/FC Comunicações | IMO TV | Garrafão do Norte | 9 | 46 | RTV | No information |
| Sistema Floresta de Comunicação/FC Comunicações | TV São Miguel | São Miguel do Guamá | —N/a | 12 (26) | RTV | 1996 |
| Sistema Floresta de Comunicação/FC Comunicações | TV Goianésia | Goianésia do Pará | —N/a | 8 (26) | RTV | 1996 |
| Sistema Floresta de Comunicação/FC Comunicações | TV Moju | Moju | —N/a | —N/a | RTV | No information |
| Organizações Nivaldo Pereira | TV Ponta Negra | Santarém | —N/a | 9 (24) | RTV | 1987 |
| Organizações Nivaldo Pereira | TV Ponta Negra | Oriximiná | —N/a | 24 (in deployment) | RTV | No information |
| Grupo Correio de Comunicação | TV Correio | Marabá | —N/a | 26 (28) | RTV | 2016 |
| Grupo Correio de Comunicação | TV Correio | Parauapebas | —N/a | 40 (28) | RTV | No information |
| Grupo Correio de Comunicação | TV Correio | Canaã dos Carajás | —N/a | 8 (28) | RTV | No information |
| Rede de Rádio e Televisão Vale do Xingu Ltda. | TV Vale do Xingu | Altamira | —N/a | 10 (38) | RTV | 1989 |
| Rádio e TV Cidade Sul do Pará Ltda. | TVI | Redenção | —N/a | 7 (29) | RTV | 2000 |
| Tapajós Publicidade Ltda. | TV Tapajoara | Itaituba | —N/a | 7 (25) | RTV | 1988 |
| Sistema Maratauira de Comunicações Ltda. | SBT Abaetetuba | Abaetetuba | —N/a | 23 (27) | RTV | No information |
| Ouro Verde Comunicações Ltda. | SBT Paragominas | Paragominas | —N/a | 25 | RTV | No information |
| SBT - Sistema Bragantino de Televisão Ltda. | TV Ajiru | Bragança | —N/a | 26 | RTV | 2016 |
| Rádio e TV Montes Claros de Alenquer Ltda. | TV Montes Claros | Alenquer | —N/a | 11 (27) | RTV | 1991 |
| Rede de Comunicação Regional | SBT Xinguara | Xinguara | —N/a | 9 (36) | RTV | 1996 |
| Prefeitura Municipal de Dom Eliseu | Prime TV | Dom Eliseu | 9 | 26 | RTV | 2005 |
| Rádio Televisão Fraternidade Ltda. | TV Fraternidade | Curuçá | 9 | 26 (in deployment) | RTV | No information |
| Grupo Ideal dos Montes | TV Ideal | Vigia | 9 | 26 (in deployment) | RTV | No information |
| Gráfica Talento | TV Talento | Uruará | —N/a | 49 | RTV | 2016 |
| - | N1TV | Conceição do Araguaia | 14 | 14 (in deployment) | RTV | No information |
| - | TV Arraias | Jacundá | —N/a | 46 | RTV | No information |
| - | TV Santana | Santana do Araguaia | 11 | 43 (in deployment) | RTV | No information |
| - | TV Portel | Portel | —N/a | 51 | RTV | No information |
| - | TV Cidade | Brasil Novo | 11 | —N/a | RTV | No information |
| Portal Jamanxim | TV Jamanxim | Novo Progresso | —N/a | 15 | RTV | No information |
| Bacex Comércio e Exportação Ltda. | TV STM | Mocajuba | 13 | 36 | RTV | No information |
| Conselho de Desenvolvimento Comunitário de Tucuma | TV Xingu | São Félix do Xingu | 4 | —N/a | RTV | No information |
| TV Guajará Ltda. | TV Guajará | Tailândia | 7 | 33 | RTV | No information |
| TV Guajará Ltda. | TV Guajará | Tomé-Açu | —N/a | 6 (46) | RTV | No information |

=== Paraíba ===
| Grupo | Station | City | Channel | Callsign | Affiliate since |
|---|---|---|---|---|---|
| Rede Tambaú de Comunicação | TV Tambaú | João Pessoa | 5 (31) | ZYB 273 | 1995 |
| Sistema Opinião de Comunicação | TV Borborema | Campina Grande | 9 (30) | ZYQ 802 | 1989 |

=== Paraná ===
| Grupo | Station | City | Analog channel | Digital channel | Callsign | Affiliate since |
|---|---|---|---|---|---|---|
| Grupo Massa | TV Iguaçu | Curitiba | —N/a | 4 (39) | ZYQ 217 | 1981 |
| Grupo Massa | TV Tibagi | Apucarana / Maringá | —N/a | 11 (39 / 21) | ZYQ 206 | 1981 |
| Grupo Massa | TV Naipi | Foz do Iguaçu | —N/a | 12 (39) | ZYB 401 | 1985 |
| Grupo Massa | TV Cidade | Londrina | —N/a | 5 (23) | ZYB 407 | 1989 |
| Grupo Massa | TV Guará | Francisco Beltrão / Ponta Grossa | 2 | 30 / 28 (27) | ZYB 432 | 2012 |

=== Pernambuco ===
| Grupo | Station | City | Channel | Callsign | Affiliate since |
|---|---|---|---|---|---|
| Sistema Jornal do Commercio de Comunicação | TV Jornal | Recife | 2 (35) | ZYB 338 | 1987 |
| Sistema Jornal do Commercio de Comunicação | TV Jornal Interior | Caruaru | 4 (35) | ZYB 308 | 2004 |

=== Piauí ===
| Grupo | Station | City | Channel | Callsign | Affiliate since |
|---|---|---|---|---|---|
| Grupo Cidade Verde | TV Cidade Verde | Teresina | 5 (28) | ZYP 311 | 2000 |
| Grupo Cidade Verde | TV Cidade Verde Picos | Picos | 5 (16) | ZYB 360 | 2022 |

=== Rio Grande do Norte ===
| Grupo | Station | City | Channel | Callsign | Affiliate since |
|---|---|---|---|---|---|
| Sistema Ponta Negra de Comunicação | TV Ponta Negra | Natal | 13 (36) | ZYP 286 | 1987 |

=== Rondônia ===
| Grupo | Station | City | Channel | Callsign | Affiliate since |
|---|---|---|---|---|---|
| Grupo Norte de Comunicação | TV Norte Rondônia | Porto Velho | 13 (36) | ZYB 592 | 1988 |

=== Roraima ===
| Grupo | Station | City | Channel | Callsign | Affiliate since |
|---|---|---|---|---|---|
| Grupo Norte de Comunicação | TV Norte Boa Vista | Boa Vista | 12 (40) | RTV | 2021 |
| - | TV Itacutu | Bonfim | 3 | RTV | 2026 |

=== Santa Catarina ===
| Grupo | Station | City | Analog channel | Digital channel | Callsign | Affiliate since |
|---|---|---|---|---|---|---|
| Sistema Catarinense de Comunicações | SCC SBT | Florianópolis / Lages | 10 | 45 (46) / 46 | ZYB 764 | 2008 (Note: Also affiliated between 1982 and 2000.) |

=== São Paulo ===
| Grupo | Station | City | Channel | Callsign | Affiliate since |
|---|---|---|---|---|---|
| Sistema Vanguarda de Comunicação | TV Sorocaba | Sorocaba | 35 | ZYB 874 | 1990 |
| Grupo Destro | SBT Interior | Araçatuba | 7 (34) | ZYQ 835 | 1991 |
| Empresa de Comunicação PRM Ltda. | VTV | Santos | 46 (45) | ZYB 890 | 2011 |
| Grupo Thathi de Comunicação | TV Thathi Vale | São José dos Campos | 22 (48) | ZYQ 864 | 2021 |

=== Tocantins ===
| Grupo | Station | City | Analog channel | Digital channel | Callsign | Affiliate since |
|---|---|---|---|---|---|---|
| Grupo Norte de Comunicação | TV Norte Tocantins | Palmas | —N/a | 9 (21) | RTV | 2007 |
| Grupo Norte de Comunicação | TV Norte Araguaína | Araguaína | —N/a | 9 (34) | RTV | No information |
| Grupo Norte de Comunicação | TV Norte Gurupi | Gurupi | —N/a | 8 (43) | RTV | No information |
| Grupo Boa Sorte | TV Porto | Porto Nacional | —N/a | 10 (17) | RTV | No information |
| Grupo Boa Sorte | TV Norte Paraíso | Paraíso do Tocantins | —N/a | 4 (22) | RTV | No information |
| Sistema Boa Vista de Comunicação | TV Boa Vista | Tocantinópolis | 7 | 30 (in deployment) | RTV | No information |

== Via satellite ==
=== Star One D2 Analog ===
| Station | Frequency | BW filter | Polarization | Notes | References |
|---|---|---|---|---|---|
| SBT | 4170 MHz (980 MHz L Band) | 18 MHz | Vertical | Switched-off since August 28, 2024. | |

=== Star One D2 Digital C Band ===
Digital satellite dish users can only watch with a receiver compatible with the SAT HD Regional free-to-view system, which requires a decoding card.

| Station | Frequency | Symbol rate | Polarization | FEC | References |
|---|---|---|---|---|---|
| SBT | 3743 MHz | 5700 Ksps | Vertical | 2/3 | |

=== Star One D2 Digital Ku Band ===
Digital satellite dish users can only watch with a receiver compatible with the SAT HD Regional free-to-view system, which requires a decoding card. Depending on the region where the user registers, there is the distribution of the signal from the local affiliate that covers that location in the terrestrial signal. Otherwise, the signal from another broadcaster will be made available. On current SAT HD Regional receivers, the channel number is standardized. This is a list that contains O&Os and affiliates that retransmit SBT programming via satellite.

| Station | Frequency | Symbol rate | Polarization | FEC | Channel | References |
|---|---|---|---|---|---|---|
| TV Aratu | 11720 MHz | 29900 Ksps | Vertical | 2/3 | 4 | |
| TV Jangadeiro | 11720 MHz | 29900 Ksps | Vertical | 2/3 | 4 | |
| TV Serra Dourada | 11720 MHz | 29900 Ksps | Vertical | 2/3 | 4 | |
| SBT Pará | 11740 MHz | 29900 Ksps | Horizontal | 2/3 | 4 | |
| VTV | 11780 MHz | 29900 Ksps | Horizontal | 2/3 | 4 | |
| TV Norte Amazonas | 11820 MHz | 29900 Ksps | Horizontal | 2/3 | 4 | |
| SBT | 11940 MHz | 29900 Ksps | Horizontal | 2/3 | 4 | |
| SBT RS | 11940 MHz | 29900 Ksps | Horizontal | 2/3 | 4 | |
| SBT São Paulo | 11940 MHz | 29900 Ksps | Horizontal | 2/3 | 4 | |
| SBT Brasília | 12120 MHz | 29900 Ksps | Vertical | 2/3 | 4 | |
| SBT Rio | 12120 MHz | 29900 Ksps | Vertical | 2/3 | 4 | |
| TV Alterosa Belo Horizonte | 12180 MHz | 29900 Ksps | Horizontal | 2/3 | 4 | |
| TV Alterosa Centro-Oeste | 12180 MHz | 29900 Ksps | Horizontal | 2/3 | 4 | |
| TV Alterosa Leste | 12180 MHz | 29900 Ksps | Horizontal | 2/3 | 4 | |
| TV Alterosa Zona da Mata | 12180 MHz | 29900 Ksps | Horizontal | 2/3 | 4 | |

=== Sky Brasil-1 ===
Digital satellite dish users can only watch with a receiver compatible with the Nova Parabólica free-to-view system, which requires a decoding card. Depending on the region where the user registers, there is the distribution of the signal from the local affiliate that covers that location in the terrestrial signal. Otherwise, the signal from another broadcaster will be made available. This is a list that contains its O&Os and affiliates that retransmit SBT programming via satellite.

| Station | Frequency | Symbol rate | Polarization | FEC | Channel | References |
|---|---|---|---|---|---|---|
| SBT Brasília | 10802 MHz | 30000 Ksps | Horizontal | 2/3 | 4 | |
| SBT Rio | 11222 MHz | 30000 Ksps | Vertical | 5/6 | 4 | |
| SBT São Paulo | 11302 MHz | 30000 Ksps | Vertical | 2/3 | 4 | |
| SBT RS | 11470 MHz | 30000 Ksps | Vertical | ? | 4 | |
| SBT | 11510 MHz | 30000 Ksps | Horizontal | 2/3 | 4 | |
| SBT Pará | 11510 MHz | 30000 Ksps | Vertical | 2/3 | 4 | |

== Subscription television ==
| Provider | Channel |
|---|---|
| Claro TV+ | 23 / 523 HD |
| Sky | 9 / 409 HD |
| Vivo TV | 514 / 222 |

== Former affiliates ==
| Name | City | Federative unit | Channel | Current situation/affiliation | Affiliation period |
|---|---|---|---|---|---|
| TV Buré | Jacareacanga | PA | 11 | NGT | ???? - 2026 |
| SBT Água Boa | Água Boa | MT | 5 (45) | Defunct | 2023 - 2026 |
| RSTV | Sapezal | MT | 10 (45) | Defunct | 2011 - 2026 |
| SBT Paranatinga | Paranatinga | MT | 8 (45) | Defunct | 2021 - 2026 |
| TV Placas | Placas | PA | 12 (55) | Rede Brasil | 2025 - 2026 |
| TV Lago Verde | Lago Verde | MA | 24 | Defunct | 2017 - 2025 |
| TV Sapucaia | Santa Rita | MA | 7 | Defunct | ???? - 2025 |
| TV Paraíso | Paraíso do Tocantins | TO | 13 | Defunct | ???? - 2025 |
| TV Sucesso | Santa Helena, Maranhão | MA | 4 | Defunct | 2019 - 2025 |
| TV Marco Zero Cidade do Amapá | Amapá (municipality) | AP | 2 | Defunct | ???? - 2025 |
| TV Cidade | Feijó | AC | ? | Now Líder TV, Rede Brasil | 2018 - 2025 |
| TV Unifama | Guarantã do Norte | MT | 7 | Defunct | 2018 - 2024 |
| TV Tribuna | Vitória | ES | 7 | Band | 1985 - 2024 |
| TVE Marcelândia Canal 8 | Marcelândia | MT | 8 (36) | Now TV Aparecida Marcelândia TV Aparecida | 2020–2023 |
| TV Tropical | Barão de Grajaú | MA | 12 (36) | Record | 2021–2023 |
| TV Xapuri | Xapuri | AC | 7 | Defunct | 2007 -2022 |
| Viber TV | Abaetetuba | PA | 23 | Defunct | 2016 - 2022 |
| TV Rio Itapecuru e Alpercatas | Mirador | MA | 6 | Defunct | 2009 - 2022 |
| TV Rio Branco | Rio Branco | AC | 8 | TV Cultura | 1989–2022 |
| TV Difusora Itapecuru | Itapecuru Mirim | MA | 6 | Defunct | 2013 - 2021 |
| RRC TV | Tarauacá | AC | 2 | Defunct | 2012 - 2021 |
| Tropical TV | Boa Vista | RR | 10 | RedeTV! | 1991–2021 |
| TV Noroeste | Colniza | MT | 4 | Defunct | 2012–2020 |
| TV Porto Marcelândia | Marcelândia | MT | 7 | Defunct | 2017–2020 |
| TV Maracu | Viana | MA | 9 | Record | 2019–2020 |
| TV Araguaína | Araguaína | TO | 7 | TV A Crítica | 1989–2020 |
| TV Migrantes | Guarantã do Norte | MT | 13 | RedeTV! | 2009 - 2011/2013-2018 |
| TV Mutum | Nova Mutum | MT | 11 | Rede Cidade Verde | 1999–2018 |
| TV Açaí Marcelândia | Marcelândia | MT | 7 | Defunct | 2016 - 2017 |
| TV Sapucaia | Rosário | MA | 7 | Defunct | 2010–2017 |
| TV Difusora Olho d'Água | Olho d'Água das Cunhãs | MA | 11 (38) | Defunct | 2013–2017 |
| TV Cidade | Jaru | RO | 13 | TV Cultura | ????-2016 |
| TV Conquista | Lucas do Rio Verde | MT | 5 | Record | 2009–2016 |
| TV Miracema | Miracema do Tocantins | TO | 6 | RedeTV! | 2012–2016 |
| TV Paraíso Marcelândia | Marcelândia | MT | 8 | Defunct | 2014–2016 |
| TV Frizon | Paranatinga | MT | 8 | Defunct | 2011–2016/2021 |
| TV Cidade Rosa | Poconé | MT | 7 | Defunct | 1997–2016/2021 - 2026 |
| RTP TV Salinas | Salinópolis | PA | 6 (25) | Defunct | 1982 - 2015 |
| TV Eldorado | Marabá | PA | 7 | Now TV Kairós, a Boas Novas affiliate | 1992 - 2015 |
| NordesTV | Sobral | CE | 48 | Defunct | 2012–2015 |
| Amazônia TV | Parauapebas | PA | 4 | RedeTV! | ????-2015 |
| TV Regional Marcelândia | Marcelândia | MT | 2 | Defunct | 2012 - 2014 |
| TV Líder | Confresa | MT | 15 | Defunct | 2012–2013 |
| TV Colinas | Colinas do Tocantins | TO | 5 | Defunct | 2009–2012 |
| TV Rondon Marcelândia | Marcelândia | MT | 2 | Defunct | 2009 - 2012 |
| TV Diamante | Diamantino | MT | 8 | Defunct | 2008–2012 |
| TV Liberdade ODC | Olho d'Água das Cunhãs | MA | 11 | Defunct | 2011–2012 |
| TV Terra | Terra Nova do Norte | MT | 2 | Defunct | 1999–2012 |
| TV Consolação | Colinas | MA | 11 | Record | 1997-2011 |
| TV Líder | Vargem Grande | MA | 9 | Record | 2005–2011 |
| TV Vale | Água Boa | MT | 12 | Defunct | 1991–2011 |
| TV Aratu Camaçari | Camaçari | BA | 4 | Defunct But incorporated by TV Aratu | 2008–2011 |
| TVB Litoral | Santos | SP | 12 | Now TV Thathi Litoral, a Rede Bandeirantes affiliate | 1992–2011 |
| TVB Campinas | Campinas | SP | 6 | Now TV Thathi Campinas, a Record affiliate | 1990–2011 |
| TV Guarantã | Guarantã do Norte | MT | 8 | Now TV Amplitude, a Record affiliate | 1992–2009 |
| TV Tucumã | Tucumã | PA | 6 (25) | Now an independent station | 2009-???? |
| TV Cidade | Lucas do Rio Verde | MT | 4 | Defunct | 2006–2009 |
| TV Cidade Marcelândia | Marcelândia | MT | 2 | Defunct, but it was Replaced by PBC TV (Record) | 2006–2009 |
| TV Cidade Verde Cuiabá | Cuiabá | MT | 12 | Now the head station of Rede Cidade Verde | 1991–2009 |
| TV Cidade Verde Primavera do Leste | Primavera do Leste | MT | 10 | Now an owned-and-operated station of Rede Cidade Verde | ????-2009 |
| TV Cidade Verde Rondonópolis | Rondonópolis | MT | 4 | Now an owned-and-operated station of Rede Cidade Verde | 2005–2009 |
| TV Cidade Verde Juína | Juína | MT | 10 | Rede Cidade Verde | 2009 |
| TV Cidade Verde Sorriso | Sorriso | MT | 12 | Rede Cidade Verde | ????-2009 |
| TV Cidade Verde Tangará da Serra | Tangará da Serra | MT | 10 | Now an owned-and-operated station of Rede Cidade Verde | 2000–2009 |
| TV Liberdade | Juína | MT | 10 | Defunct | 2007 - 2009 |
| TV Nativa | Pelotas | RS | 18 | Now Top TV Pelotas, owned-and-operated station of Top TV | 2004–2008 |
| Rede SC Florianópolis | Florianópolis | SC | 4 | Now NDTV Florianópolis, a Record affiliate | 1989–2008 |
| Rede SC Blumenau | Blumenau | SC | 9 | Now NDTV Blumenau, a Record affiliate | 2004–2008 |
| Rede SC Chapecó | Chapecó | SC | 10 | Now NDTV Chapecó, a Record affiliate | 1989–2008 |
| Rede SC Joinville | Joinville | SC | 8 | Now NDTV Joinville, a Record affiliate | 2000–2008 |
| TV Cidade | Codó | MA | 11 | Record | 1994–2008 |
| TV A Crítica Maués | Maués | AM | 4 | Now an independent station | 1998–2007 |
| TV A Crítica | Manaus | AM | 4 | Now an independent station | 1981–2007 |
| TV A Crítica Parintins | Parintins | AM | 12 | Now an owned-and-operated station of TV A Crítica | 1998–2007 |
| TV A Crítica Presidente Figueiredo | Presidente Figueiredo | AM | 12 | Now an owned-and-operated station of TV A Crítica | 1985 – 2007 |
| TV Jovem | Palmas | TO | 11 | Record | 2000–2007 |
| TV Atalaia | Aracaju | SE | 8 | Record | 1986–2006 |
| TV Pajuçara | Maceió | AL | 11 | Record | 1992–2006 |
| TV Cidade | Rondonópolis | MT | 12 | Record | 1995–2005 |
| TV Sul Bahia | Teixeira de Freitas | BA | 5 | Now an owned-and-operated station of RIT | 1997–2004 |
| TV Açucena | Balsas | MA | 10 | Defunct | 1997–2004 |
| TV Planície | Campos dos Goytacazes | RJ | 8 | Now InterTV Planície, a TV Globo affiliate | 1989–2004 |
| TV Pampa Centro | Santa Maria | RS | 4 | RedeTV! | 1992–2003 |
| TV Pampa Norte | Carazinho | RS | 9 | RedeTV! | 1992–2003 |
| TV Pampa Sul | Pelotas | RS | 13 | RedeTV! | 1992–2003 |
| TV Dourados | Dourados | MS | 5 | Now RIT Dourados, owned-and-operated station of RIT | 1996–2002 |
| TV União dos Vales | Santa Inês | MA | 13 | Defunct | 1999–2002 |
| TV Real | Palmas | TO | 5 | Now Record News Tocantins, a Record News affiliate | 1992–2000 |
| TV Meio Norte | Teresina | PI | 7 | Now TV Meio, head station of Rede Meio | 1986–2000 |
| TV Maranhão Central | Santa Inês | MA | 10 | Now Rede Jovem Pan, independent network | 1995–1999 |
| TV SAT | Sorriso | MT | 3 | RedeTV! | 1995–1998 |
| TV Cidade | Fortaleza | CE | 8 | Record | 1987–1998 |
| TV Itapoan | Salvador | BA | 5 | Now Record Bahia, a Record O&O | 1981–1997 |
| TV Cabrália | Itabuna | BA | 7 | Hoje Record Cabrália, a Record O&O | 1993–1995 |
| TV O Norte | João Pessoa | PB | 7 | Now TV Manaíra, a RedeTV! affiliate | 1987–1995 |
| TV Cidade | Marabá | PA | 13 | Defunct | 1987 - 1992/93? |
| TV Mirante | São Luís | MA | 10 | TV Globo | 1987–1991 |
| TV do Povo | Rio Branco | AC | 12 | Defunct | 1986–1989 |
| TV Karajás | Imperatriz | MA | 13 | Now TV Nativa, a Record affiliate | 1981–1989 |
| TV Goyá | Goiânia | GO | 4 | Now Record Goiás, a Record O&O | 1981–1988 |
| TV Altamira | Altamira | PA | 6 | Rede Cultura do Pará (RBTV) | 1986–1988 |
| TV Tropical | Caruaru | PE | 12 | Now TV Pernambuco, a TV Cultura and TV Brasil affiliate | 1984–1987 |
| TV Brasília | Brasília | DF | 6 | RedeTV! | 1981–1985 |
| TV Barriga Verde | Florianópolis | SC | 9 | Rede Bandeirantes | 1982–1985 |
| TV Vitória | Vitória | ES | 6 | Record | 1981–1984 |
| TV Brasil Oeste | Cuiabá | MT | 8 | RBTV | 1981–1984 |
| TV Uberaba | Uberaba | MG | 5 | Now Band Triângulo, a Rede Bandeirantes O&O | 1981–1984 |
| TV Cultura | Chapecó | SC | 12 | Now NSC TV Chapecó, a TV Globo affiliate | 1982 |
| TV Cultura | Florianópolis | SC | 6 | Now Record News Santa Catarina, a Record News O&O | 1981–1982 |
