= SBT RS =

SBT RS (ZYB 618)
- Porto Alegre, Rio Grande do Sul; Brazil
- Channels: Digital: 28 (UHF); Virtual: 5

Programming
- Affiliations: Sistema Brasileiro de Televisão

Ownership
- Owner: Grupo Silvio Santos; (TVSBT Canal 5 de Porto Alegre S/A)

History
- First air date: August 26, 1981
- Former names: TVS Porto Alegre (1981-1990); SBT Porto Alegre (1990-2012)
- Former channel numbers: Analog: 5 (VHF, 1981-2018)

Technical information
- Licensing authority: ANATEL
- ERP: 9 kW
- Transmitter coordinates: 30°4′54.6″S 51°10′58.1″W

Links
- Public license information: Profile
- Website: www.sbt.com.br/riograndedosul/home

SBT RS (channel 5) is a Sistema Brasileiro de Televisão-owned-and-operated television station based in Porto Alegre, capital of the state of Rio Grande do Sul.

Its studios are located in the Santa Tereza neighborhood, and its transmission tower is at the top of Morro da Polícia.

== History ==
Prior to the appearance of TVS Porto Alegre, TV Piratini existed on channel 5, founded on December 20, 1959 by Diários Associados as a Rede Tupi O&O, the first television station in Porto Alegre and in Rio Grande do Sul. Like its network, its license was revoked on July 18, 1980, due to its financial crisis.

TV Piratini's license was one of the three that were acquired by Silvio Santos in March 1981.

The license started broadcasting on August 26, 1981, one week after the main station in São Paulo, as TVS Porto Alegre.

In May 2015, Anonymus Gourmet left the RBS TV affiliate compound and moved to the station. SBT Rio Grande added a second edition on August 3, 2015, airing at 7:20pm, before SBT Brasil.

In May 2016, the station saw an audience increase of 7% in its all-day average, achieving higher ratings than Record RS in the mornings. Local programs Masbah! had the largest growth, while SBT Rio Grande surpassed Record's schedule in its two editions.

On the morning of April 16, 2018, sports journalist Ricardo Vidarte, of the local edition of SBT Esportes, died of a heart attack.

On June 22, 2026, the Canal D column of the Brazilian newspaper O Dia reported that Grupo Silvio Santos had finalized an agreement to transfer operational control of SBT RS (the network's owned-and-operated station in Porto Alegre) to Grupo SCC, which already operates the SBT affiliate in Santa Catarina. The report cited below‑expectation audience and commercial results in Porto Alegre, drawing a parallel to the earlier outsourcing of SBT's Belém station to Grupo Norte. On the same day, SBT's press office issued an official denial, stating that "there is no conversation, partnership plan or negotiation" regarding such a transfer and that SBT RS remains a regional station directly controlled by the São Paulo headquarters.

== Technical information ==
On August 25, 2014, as part of a measure involving five SBT O&Os, the station started producing local content in high definition; until then, SBT RS only aired high definition programming from the network.

The station shut down its analog signal on March 14, 2018, date of the closure of analog TV in the Porto Alegre metropolitan area, according to the ANATEL roadmap.
