= TV Sul Bahia =

Brazilian television station

TV Sul Bahia (ZYA 305)
- Teixeira de Freitas, Bahia; Brazil
- Channels: Digital: 40 (UHF); Virtual: 5

Programming
- Affiliations: RIT Notícias

Ownership
- Owner: Fundação Internacional de Comunicação; (Televisão Sul Bahia de Teixeira de Freitas Ltda.)

History
- Founded: May 2, 1996
- First air date: November 3, 1996
- Former channel numbers: Analog: 5 (VHF, 1996-2022)
- Former affiliations: Rede Manchete (1996-1997); SBT (1997-2004); TV Canção Nova (2004-2006); TV+ (2006-2007); RIT (2008-2023)

Technical information
- Licensing authority: ANATEL
- ERP: 1 kW

Links
- Public license information: Profile
- Website: rittv.com.br/tv-sul-bahia

TV Sul Bahia (channel 5) is a Brazilian television station licensed to Teixeira de Freitas, Bahia, serving as an affiliate of RIT Notícias, a news network owned by R. R. Soares. The station also has relays outside of the state of Bahia.

== History ==
Television signals were first available in Teixeira de Freitas in the early 1970s, when a group of locals created Clube da TV, with the aim of installing a television set capable to receive TV Itapoan, the state's Rede Tupi affiliate. By 1985, when Teixeira de Freitas became a city, locals could now receive the four commercial stations out of Salvador: TV Itapoan was joined by TV Bandeirantes Bahia, TV Aratu and TV Bahia. It was Manchete, which by 1988 had moved to TV Aratu (after a scandal involving NEC do Brasil prompting TV Aratu and TV Bahia to switch affiliations), that piqued interest among locals, especially due to its airing of Japanese tokusatsus.

TV Sul Bahia was founded on May 2, 1996, but started broadcasting on November 3, 1996. The station opened as a Rede Manchete affiliate during its first year on air, having Extremo Sul em Manchete as its newscast. The primetime telenovela Manchete was airing at the time, Xica da Silva, became a huge success among locals.

At an unknown date in late 1997 (after August when Xica da Silva ended), the station left Manchete, which was facing a financial crisis and a mass exodus of its affiliates to other networks. The station joined SBT and, consequently, its news operation was renamed TJ Sul Bahia, following the pattern of the network's TJ Brasil. During the station's early years, it was owned by politician Francistônio Pinto.

In October 2001, the station was sold to Nizan Guanaes, later in November the negotiations were still ongoing, who obtained a license to operate in the São Paulo metropolitan area in May 2002 to relay its programming and form a national network from TV Sul Bahia in Teixeira de Freitas. He tried to rent air time on Rede 21, but failed, prompting him to request a license in February 2002. His goal was to set up the relay station on UHF channel 40. In late June, he invested in the installation of five relay stations in adjacent areas (Alcobaça, Itabatã, Taquarinha, Mucuri and Posto da Mata). The relay stations already existed, but were irregular according to Guanaes. The Ministry of Communications said that the channels for the five municipalities were new.

In November 2003, the station decided to leave SBT and join TV Canção Nova, a charismatic Catholic network. On November 28, it announced a ceremony from Igreja da Sé scheduled for December 6, but decided to cancel it the following day, opting to make "a larger event". At the time, the UHF frequency it pretended to use for the São Paulo metro area was being disputed with another Catholic network, Rede Vida, which also broadcast on channel 40. A Rede Vida executive said that its viewing audience had gained the habit of watching on channel 40, and that Canção Nova was "not being elegant". Rede Vida had a license to operate on channel 34, but had not activated the signal yet. The agreement was formalized in January 2004. Guanaes announced that it would help Canção Nova in producing the station's news operation, as well as the station in general. João Augusto Valente of DM9DDB was in charge of graphics (bumpers and logos) and studio sets.

On October 30, 2006, the station left Canção Nova and joined TV+, a local network from the ABC Region. The move enabled the network to be receivable in southern Bahia.

It is unknown what led to R. R. Soares buying the station in 2007, consequently becoming a RIT affiliate. The affiliation was already there in July 2007, date in which the station started airing O Grande Estado de São Paulo, presented by federal deputee André Soares. The first edition was dedicated to the São Paulo capital area and had visits to the Municipal Market, the Portuguese Language Museum and the effects of the city after the passing of the Cidade Limpa law. On October 1, 2012, the station's technician Geraldo Cerqueira Dutra, which has been with the station since its inception, died. It is also unknown what motivated the station to join RIT Notícias, R. R. Soares' news network, in 2023.

== Technical information ==
| Channel | Video | Aspect | Short name | Programming |
|---|---|---|---|---|
| 5.1 | 1080i | 16:9 | TV SUL BAHIA | Main TV Sul Bahia programming / RIT Notícias |

The station received its permit for digital terrestrial television operations on September 17, 2010, commencing its broadcasts in experimental mode on August 31, 2012. According to the ANATEL ordinance, the station was set to switch on all of its digital transmitters in its coverage area by the end of 2013.

The station's digital transmitter in Paulo Afonso, in the north of Bahia, opened on December 11, 2018.
