= TVS+ =

TVS+ (ZYB 874)
- Sorocaba, São Paulo; Brazil
- Channels: Digital: 35 (UHF); Virtual: 35

Programming
- Affiliations: SBT

Ownership
- Owner: Sistema Vanguarda de Comunicação; (Televisão Sorocaba Ltda.)

History
- First air date: October 5, 1990
- Former names: TV Sorocaba (1990-2025)
- Former channel numbers: Analog: 36 (UHF, 1990-2018)

Technical information
- Licensing authority: ANATEL
- Transmitter coordinates: 23°28′50.8″S 47°25′13.1″W

Links
- Public license information: Profile
- Website: tvsorocaba.com.br

TVS+ (channel 35) is a television station in Sorocaba, São Paulo, Brazil, affiliated with SBT and owned by Sistema Vanguarda de Comunicação. TVS+'s studios and transmitter are located on Engenheiro Carlos Reinaldo Mendes Avenue, in the Alto da Boa Vista district.

== History ==
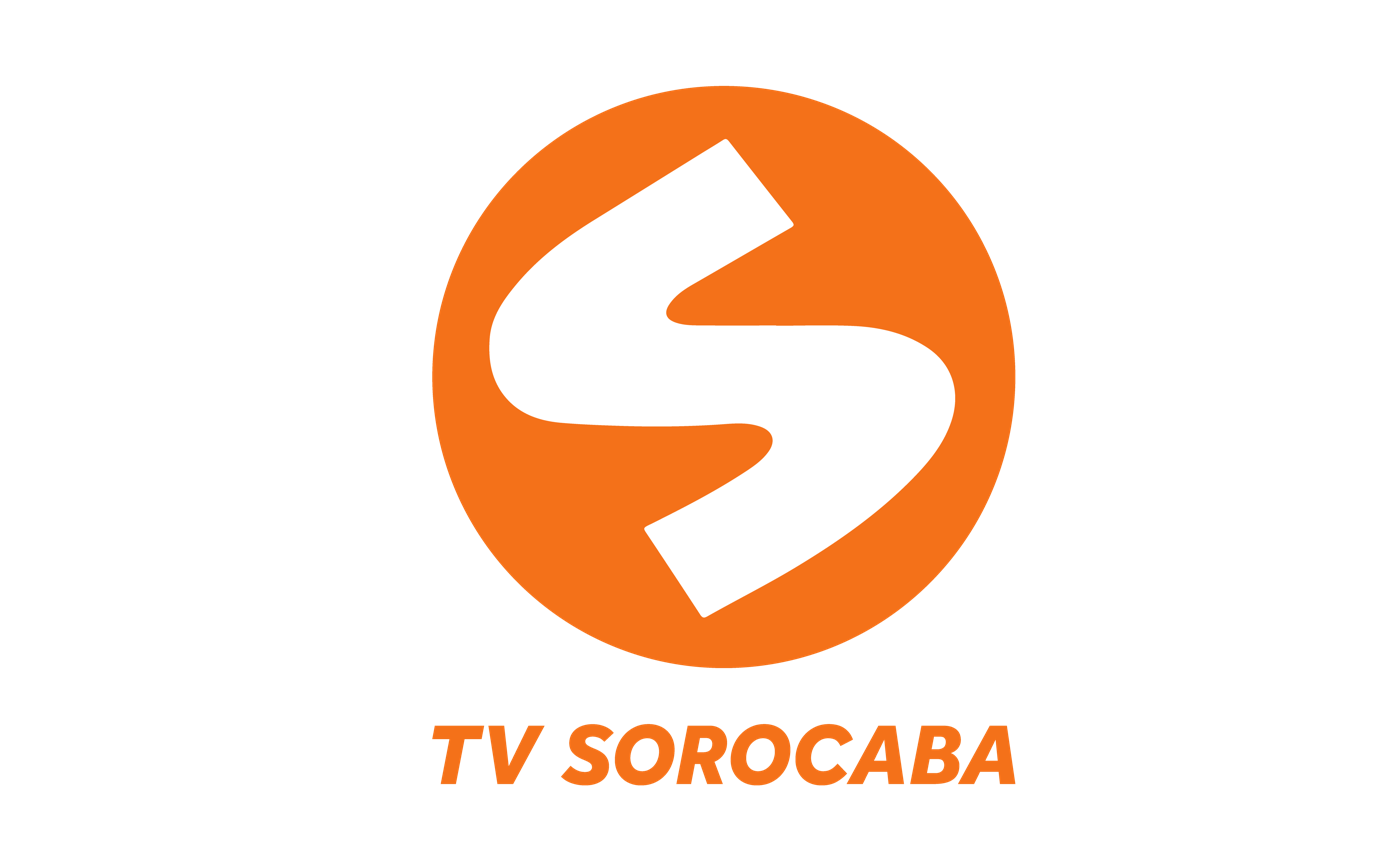
Logo of the station used between 2016 and 2025, when it was called TV Sorocaba.

Before TV Sorocaba, the city was served by a UHF relay of TV Tupi São Paulo on channel 28. When it closed in 1980, the relay was taken over by SBT São Paulo, who only implemented it in 1982. After the launch of the station, SBT was temporarily broadcast on two channels (28 and 35); the SBT São Paulo relay on channel 28 was shut down in 1991 and replaced by TV Jovem Pan; by 2002, it was occupied by Catholic network Rede Vida.

It was founded on October 5, 1990, by the businessman and journalist Salomão Pavlovsky in association with Grupo Silvio Santos. In 1994, TV Sorocaba inaugurated its own headquarters on Alto da Boa Vista district, at one of the highest points of the city, where later, other media outlets, like TV TEM Sorocaba and the newspaper Cruzeiro do Sul would make its headquarters.

In the mid-2011, entered on air the program Quiz D+, at Sundays of the station, the single artistic program and one of the largest regional audiences of SBT. On February 25, 2013, the station premiered two new newscasts: Noticidade Manhã, on the 7 AM slot, and Manchetes Noticidade, on the 1 PM slot.

On August 15, 2023, day in which the city of Sorocaba turned 369, TV Sorocaba inaugurated its new headquarters, located on the Alto da Boa Vista district. On this event, the station presented changes in its programming, including the premiere of the regional version of the program Primeiro Impacto and the implementation of a new scenario to its newscasts, that now has a panoramic view of the city.

On December 31, 2025, after 35 years on air as TV Sorocaba, the station changed its name and was renamed TVS+.

== Digital television ==
Channel	Video	Aspect	Programming
35.1	35 UHF	1080i	Main TVS+ programming / SBT

The station started its digital transmissions on November 30, 2009, over UHF channel 35, being the first affiliated with SBT in the inland of the state of São Paulo with digital signal. On February 25, 2013, the newscasts and programs of the stations passed to be produced in high-definition.

Transition to digital signal

The station turned off its analog signal, over UHF channel 36, on January 17, 2018, as part of the federally mandated transition from analog to digital television. The station's digital signal remains on its pre-transition UHF channel 35, using virtual channel 35.
