= SBT RP =

SBT RP (ZYQ 839)
- Ribeirão Preto, São Paulo; Brazil
- Channels: Digital: 24 (UHF); Virtual: 5

Programming
- Affiliations: SBT

Ownership
- Owner: Grupo Silvio Santos Grupo Thathi; (TV Studios de Ribeirão Preto Ltda.)

History
- First air date: 21 January 1988
- Former call signs: ZYB 867 (1988–2018)
- Former names: TVS Ribeirão Preto (1988-1990); SBT Ribeirão Preto (1990-2014)
- Former channel numbers: Analog: 5 (VHF, 1988–2018)

Technical information
- Licensing authority: ANATEL
- ERP: 2.5 kW
- Transmitter coordinates: 21°9′23.8″S 47°50′16.2″W

Links
- Public license information: Profile
- Website: www.sbt.com.br

SBT RP (channel 5) is a Brazilian television station licensed to Ribeirão Preto, São Paulo, that is affiliated with SBT. It generates its signal locally and to other municipalities in the state's inland area.

== History ==
President João Figueiredo, through Decree nº.91.022 awarded the license to Silvio Santos' licensee TV Studios de Ribeirão Preto Ltda. on February 27, 1985. The license started broadcasting on January 21, 1988 as TVS Ribeirão Preto from Javari Street; in 1990, coinciding with the phasing out of the TVS brand in favor of SBT, it started producing its own news programs, following the national TJ Brasil brand, which aimed to differ from those seen on EPTV Ribeirão.

The station's ratings increased in June 2014, with a 100% increase in viewers from 6pm to midnight, surpassing Record RP.

In 2022, the station was interested in changing satellites due to the old satellite being incompatible with the potential entrance of 5G technologies in Brazil, but still had no costs to cover the operation.

== Technical information ==
Virtual channel	Digital channel	Aspect ratio	Content
5.1	24 UHF	1080i	SBT RP/SBT programming

SBT RP (at the time SBT Ribeirão Preto) authorized the beginning of its digital broadcasts on September 29, 2009, commencing service on October 1, alongside EPTV Ribeirão and TV Clube, the Band affiliate.
