= Band Bahia =

TV Bandeirantes Bahia (ZYA 597)

Salvador, Bahia; Brazil
- Channels: Digital: 26 (UHF); Virtual: 4
- Branding: Band Bahia

Programming
- Affiliations: Rede Bandeirantes

Ownership
- Owner: Grupo Bandeirantes de Comunicação; (Rádio e Televisão Bandeirantes S.A.)
- Sister stations: BandNews FM Salvador

History
- First air date: April 11, 1981
- Former channel numbers: Analog: 4 (VHF, 1981-2018)

Technical information
- Licensing authority: ANATEL
- ERP: 12 kW
- Transmitter coordinates: 12°59′46.4″S 38°30′29″W

Links
- Public license information: Profile
- Website: bandba.com.br

Band Bahia (channel 4) is a Rede Bandeirantes-owned-and-operated station licensed to the city of Salvador, capital of the state of Bahia. The station also serves as a regional flagship for the Northeast Region on special broadcasts.

The station also extends its coverage beyong Bahia, with a relay station in Aracaju, Sergipe, which operates commercially as Band Aracaju.

== History ==
The station was founded on April 11, 1981, by João Jorge Saad and Renato Rebouças, becoming the third television station in Bahia, behind TV Aratu (founded in 1969) and TV Itapoan (1960). Until 1995, its official name was TV Bandeirantes Bahia. Nwith the change adopted by the network during carnaval, the Bahian station followed the pattern and was renamed Band Bahia.

In 2003, Band's signal in Aracaju was replaced by a Band Bahia relay. Over time, other cities in the state received its feed. In 2015, this feed was named Band Aracaju.

On June 18, 2008, the station inaugurated a news center which made the production of three programs at the same time viable, as well as changes to some local programs such as Jogo Aberto Bahia, Bahia Urgente and Boa Tarde Bahia, and a change in presenters.

Between 2012 and 2013, Band introduced the local versions of Brasil Urgente and Os Donos da Bola, apresented, respectively, by Uziel Bueno and Juliana Guimarães, with commentary by Dito Lopes. Brasil Urgente Bahia ended in 2015, one year after Uziel left the station, due to the financial crisis Grupo Bandeirantes was facing at the time.

On May 21, 2018, the station started investing in local programming again with Band Mulher, an afternoon variety program presented by Pâmela Lucciola. One week later, on May 28, the local edition of Brasil Urgente returned, marking the return of Uziel Bueno to the station.

On September 9, 2019, the station started airing Programa Seis em Ponto, from Rádio Metrópole, presented by radio personality Geraldo Júnior. On October 7, Os Donos da Bola BA was discontinued and replaced by Jogo Aberto Bahia, with the same team.

On March 22, 2021, it premiered Nordeste Urgente, with Uziel Bueno, also seen on part of Band's stations in the region as well as on Band Amazonas in Manaus.

On November 9, 2023, journalist Júlia Sarmento ended working at Band Bahia, being responsible for the management of the main station in São Paulo.

== Technical information ==
Virtual channel	Digital channel	Screen	Content
7.1	46 UHF	1080i	Band Bahia/Band's main schedule

The station started digital broadcasts on UHF channel 46 on June 11, 2010. In June 2012, its programming started to be produced in high definition.

The analog signal was switched off on September 27, 2017.
