= Antônio Primo =

Brazilian politician

Mayor of Buriticupu
- In office January 1, 2005 – December 31, 2012

Personal details
- Born: Antônio Marcos de Oliveira; May 2, 1950 (age 75) Anápolis, GO
- Party: PDT (2003–present); PSDB (1999–2003); PMDB (1980–1999); ARENA (1966–1980)
- Spouse: Francisca Primo

Antônio Marcos de Oliveira, better known as Antônio Primo (born May 2, 1950) is a Brazilian politician. He was mayor of Buriticupu (2005–2013). Primo is the husband of Francisca Primo (PCdoB).
