= Xingu =

Xingu may refer to:

- Distinctly Brazilian topics:
  - Major, and also original, senses:
    - Xingu River, in north Brazil, southeast tributary of the Amazon
    - Xingu peoples, indigenous peoples living near the Xingu River
    - Xingu Indigenous Park, located in the state of Mato Grosso, Brazil
  - Strongly related to the river and/or peoples:
    - Xingu (film), 2011 Brazilian drama by director Cao Hamburger
    - Roman Catholic Territorial Prelature of Xingu, located in the area of the Xingu River
    - Xingu corydoras (Corydoras xinguensis), a tropical freshwater fish
    - Xingu River ray (Potamotrygon leopoldi), a tropical freshwater ray endemic to the river
    - Xingu Beer, a beer named after the river.
    - Embraer EMB 121 Xingu, twin turboprop light airplane
    - Xingu!, 2007 comic book in the Vic Voyage series
    - TV Vale do Xingu, a television station in Altamira, Pará, Brazil
- Exotic names (but lacking obvious relationship to Latin America):
  - Xingu Hill, a project of musician John Sellekaers
  - Prose fiction:
    - Xingu, character in James Thurber's children's book The 13 Clocks
    - Xingu and Other Stories, early short-story collection by Edith Wharton
