= Francisca Primo =

Brazilian teacher, social worker and politician

Member of a Legislative Assembly
- Incumbent
- Assumed office February 1, 2011
- Constituency: Maranhão

Personal details
- Born: Francisca Ferreira; March 28, 1968 (age 58) Presidente Dutra, MA
- Party: PCdoB
- Spouse: Antônio Primo
- Profession: Teacher

Francisca Ferreira, known in political environment as Francisca Primo (born March 28, 1968) is a Brazilian teacher, social worker and politician. She is currently a state representative of Maranhão by the Communist Party of Brazil, but was elected by the Workers' Party. She is married to the former mayor of Buriticupu, Antônio Primo and mother of two children.

== Biography ==
=== Political career ===
He began his political career as a member of the Brazilian Democratic Movement Party during his youth.

She was elected state deputy for the first time in 2010 and was re-elected in 2014 by the Workers' Party. It. Retrieved 30,192 votes in 2010 and 27,330 votes in 2014.

After the passage to the Workers Party, Francisca Primo joined the Communist Party of Brazil in March 2016.

In this party, the mayor of Buriticupu was applied in 2016, being defeated by the mayor Zé Gomes. It. Retrieved 13,574 votes, while the candidate of the Brazilian Republican Party was re-elected with 18,074 votes.
