= TV Ponta Negra =

TV Ponta Negra (ZYP 286)
Natal, Rio Grande do Norte; Brazil
- Channels: Digital: 36 (UHF); Virtual: 13
- Branding: TV Ponta Negra

Programming
- Affiliations: SBT

Ownership
- Owner: Sistema Ponta Negra de Comunicação; (TV Ponta Negra Ltda.)
- Sister stations: 95 Mais FM

History
- First air date: March 15, 1987
- Former call signs: ZYB 561 (1987-2018)
- Former channel numbers: Analog: 13 (VHF, 1987-2018)

Technical information
- Licensing authority: ANATEL
- ERP: 4 kW
- Transmitter coordinates: 5°47′48.8″S 35°11′46.6″W

Links
- Public license information: Profile
- Website: pontanegranews.com.br/tv-ponta-negra

TV Ponta Negra (channel 13) is an SBT-affiliated television station licensed to the city of Natal, capital of the state of Rio Grande do Norte, owned by Sistema Ponta Negra de Comunicação. Its studios are located in the Lagoa Seca neighborhood and its transmitting antenna is located at Parque das Dunas, in Tirol.

== History ==
In 1986, the then senator Carlos Alberto de Sousa, received from the Federal Government the concession of VHF channel 13 in Natal. The first step towards the implementation of TV Ponta Negra was taken there. After that, Carlos Alberto began building the station's future headquarters, which initially operated in a small building beneath its transmission tower, in Parque das Dunas.

After that, Carlos Alberto looked for a television network for his station. He chose SBT, given the relations he had with the network's owner, Silvio Santos. The relation between the two was so great that Silvio even lent equipment used by TVS Brasília and TVS Rio de Janeiro so that the station could go on air. This equipment was returned six months after the station opened.

YB Ponta Negra went on air on March 15, 1987, with the live broadcast of the inauguration of the then governor Geraldo Melo. The following day, the station broadcast its first programs: the news program Notícias da Cidade, the variety program Programa Carlos Alberto (presented by the station's owner), and the local version of the news program O Povo na TV. At the beginning of its activities, the station only had 20 employees. In April 1989, it began operating from its new headquarters in the Lagoa Seca neighborhood, where it remains today.

In 1990, Carlos Alberto de Sousa's daughter, Micarla de Sousa, began working in the broadcaster's journalistic area, as a reporter and editor of the news programs. In the same year, Notícias da Cidade gave way to TJ RN. The following year, Patrulha Policia and the local edition of Aqui Agora debuted. In 1995, Micarla assumed the superintendence of Sistema Ponta Negra de Comunicação, a company made up of TV Ponta Negra, radio 95 FM and the video production company Imagem Produções.

On June 20, 1997, the broadcaster launched the website www.tvpontanegra.com.br, being one of the first TV stations to have a website in the country. On December 22, 1998, the owner and founder of the station, Carlos Alberto de Sousa, died as a result of leukemia. His wife, Miriam de Sousa, together with his daughters Micarla and Priscila, took control of the station and the Ponta Negra Communication System. In 1999, Jornal do Dia debuted, a news program that airs on the station's afternoons.

In 2000, Aqui Agora gave way to the journalistic 60 Minutos. At the same time, the entertainment program Mais debuted. In 2006, Patrulha Policia changed its name to Patrulha da Cidade. According to a survey carried out by IBOPE in September 2011, between the hours of 12pm and 2pm, TV Ponta Negra began to lead the audience on Grande Natal. During the day, the broadcaster beat InterTV Cabugi, the local TV Globo affiliate, several times.

On January 27, 2014, Cearese group Hapvida purchased 51% of the shares of TV Ponta Negra, for an estimated value of R$20 million. According to specialized websites, SBT also entered the business by purchasing 15% of the shares, while Fernando Eugênio (former superintendent of the station) would keep 5%. Its acquisition was the starting point of Sistema Opinião de Comunicação.

With it, there was the modernization of several of its equipment, as well as the implementation of the digital signal of TV Ponta Negra, which was one of the only major TV channels in the city of Natal that did not yet provide a digital signal at the time. The first changes began in 2014, with the acquisition of portable equipment to make it possible to hold live external events, and with the launch of the digital signal on June 25.

In October 2017, TV Ponta Negra again announced leadership in audience in the 12pm-2pm range in Rio Grande do Norte. This was accompanied by a series of changes at the station, including the return of Priscila de Sousa to Tudo de Bom and the change of all program sets, graphic packages and bumpers. In November, the hiring of Vanessa Florêncio, formerly of TV Manaíra, was announced to reinforce the channel's sports journalism.

In January 2021, Sistema Opinião de Comunicação left control of TV Ponta Negra, and resold the 51% of the shares it owned to Sistema Ponta Negra de Comunicação, which now holds controlling interest in the broadcaster again. The information was confirmed on January 12th through a note sent to the market. On March 28, 2022, in celebration of its 35th anniversary, the station reformulated its daily programming, with successful names returning to present its programs, such as Lídia Pace and Micarla de Sousa.

== Technical information ==
Virtual channel	Digital channel	Screen	Content
36.1	13 UHF	1080i	TV Ponta Negra/SBT's main schedule

The station began its digital transmissions on June 25, 2014, through channel 36 UHF for Natal and nearby areas. On March 26, 2018, the station began broadcasting its programming in high definition.

=== Analog-to-digital conversion ===
The station closed its analog signal on VHF channel 13 on May 30, 2018, following the official ANATEL roadmap.
