= TV Serra Dourada =

TV Serra Dourada (ZYA 576)
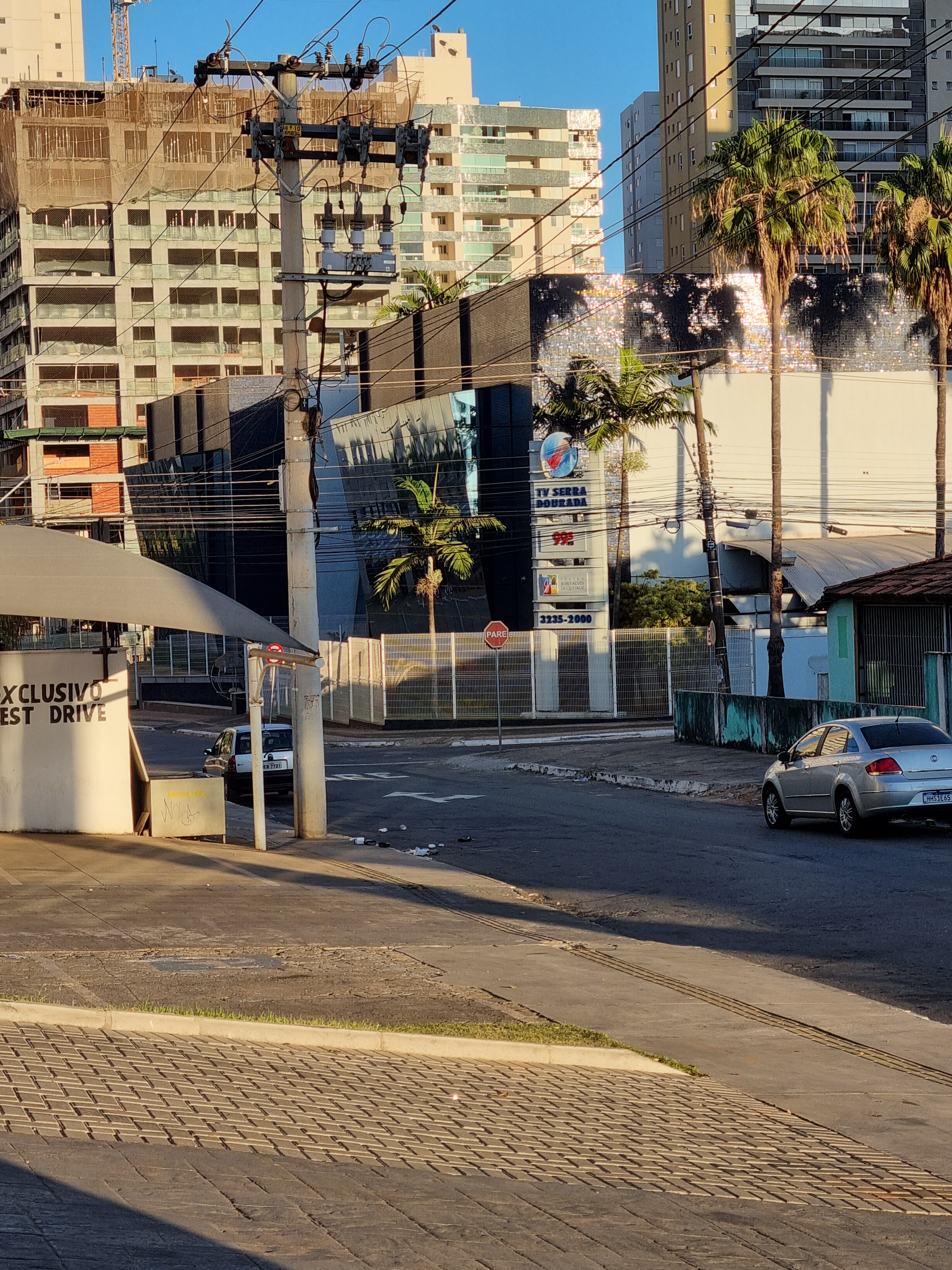
- TV Serra Dourada headquarters
- Goiânia, Goiás; Brazil
- Channels: Digital: 20 (UHF); Virtual: 9
- Branding: TV Serra Dourada

Programming
- Affiliations: Sistema Brasileiro de Televisão

Ownership
- Owner: Serra Dourada Comunicações; (TV Serra Dourada Ltda.)

History
- Founded: 1985
- First air date: May 14, 1989
- Former channel numbers: Analog: 9 (VHF, 1989–2017)

Technical information
- Licensing authority: ANATEL
- ERP: 5,4 kW
- Transmitter coordinates: 16°39′52.2″S 49°20′30″W

Links
- Public license information: Profile
- Website: www.recordgoias.com.br

TV Serra Dourada (channel 9) is a Brazilian television station seated in Goiânia, capital of the state of Goiás. It operates on virtual channel 9 (UHF digital 20) and is an SBT affiliate. Owned by Serra Dourada Comunicações, it generates its programming to around 90% of the state.Its studios are located at the Castorina Bittencourt Alves building, at Jardim Goiás, while its antenna is located at Morro do Mendanha, in the Jardim Petrópolis neighborhood.

== History ==
The license for VHF channel 9 in Goiânia was granted by João Figueiredo on March 12, 1985, to a company led by Goianese senator Benedito Vicente Ferreira. However, it was handed over to businessman José Alves Filho, owner of retail outlet Alô Brasil and food company Arisco, who was responsible for the implementation of the station. TV Serra Dourada was inaugurated on May 14, 1989, and has been an SBT affiliate since the beginning, which had kicked off TV Goyá from its affiliate base the previous year. Its inaugural programming had two local news editions, Informativo Serra Dourada and TJ Goiás, local version of TJ Brasil.

The main program, Jornal do Meio Dia, was created on September 30, 1991 by Cassim Zaidem. Currently on air, it is a community service newscast with the length of 85 minutes, mixing news, commentary, music and social services. In 1994, due to financial problems the Alô Brasil group was facing, TV Serra Dourada was sold to businessman João Alves de Queiroz Filho, owner of food industries Arisco and Assolan, starting to become a part of the group of the same name.

TV Serra Dourada's first facilities, at Pouso Alto street in the Campinas sector, suffered a fire in 1999, and with the creation of Serra Dourada FM (now 99,5 FM) it was necessary to increase the size of its facilities, which was not possible in the previous location. The Castorina Bittencourt Alves building was built in Jardim Goiás and inaugurated in 2002, having two TV studios, radio facilities, as well as Teatro João Alves de Queiroz.

== Technical information ==
Virtual	Digital channel	Aspect ratio	Content
9.1	20 UHF	1080i	TV Serra Dourada/SBT programming

== Controversies ==
=== Kidnapping of Wellington Camargo ===
On the early hours of March 13, 1999, Wellington Camargo's ear, brother of the sertanejo duo Zezé Di Camargo & Luciano, was placed in the station's garden, at the time of his kidnapping. The act was a response from the kidnappers to the family's constant questions about whether Wellington was still alive or not.

=== Jornadas de Junho ===
During the 2013 protests in Brazil, on June 24, 2013 the station's report vans, as well as those of TV Anhanguera Goiânia and local newspaper O Popular were destroyed in front of the headquarters of the Municipality of Goiânia. The station's facilities were also attacked by the vandals, who stoned the front of the building.

=== Aggression to journalist Maycon Leão ===
On March 15, 2021, reporter Maycon Leão and his cameraman were damaged by a protester while they were making a live report for Jornal do Meio-Dia, about a protest that was blocking traffic in the BR-153 highway, against a statewide decree to close commercial activities to prevent the growth of the pandemic at the time.
