= SBT Central =

SBT Central (ZYQ 837)
- Jaú, São Paulo; Brazil
- Channels: Digital: 24 (UHF); Virtual: 12
- Branding: SBT

Programming
- Affiliations: SBT

Ownership
- Owner: Grupo Silvio Santos Grupo Thathi; (TV Studios de Jaú S/A)

History
- First air date: 31 May 1983
- Former call signs: ZYB 864 (1983–2018)
- Former names: TVS Jaú (1983-1990); SBT Centro-Oeste Paulista (1990-2014)
- Former channel numbers: Analog: 12 (VHF, 1983–2017)

Technical information
- Licensing authority: ANATEL
- ERP: 1 kW
- Transmitter coordinates: 22°15′32.6″S 48°33′13.4″W

Links
- Public license information: Profile
- Website: www.sbt.com.br/home

SBT Jaú (channel 12) is a Brazilian television station affiliated with SBT, licensed to the city of Jaú that covers the center-west of the state of São Paulo, which, in addition to Jaú, also includes key cities such as Marília, Bauru, Araraquara, São Carlos, among others.

== History ==
The company was established on February 9, 1978, as TV Studios de Jaú Ltda.; this was before Silvio Santos gained a license in São Paulo to serve as the main station of the new SBT network upon the closure of Rede Tupi in 1980.

The station was founded in 1983 as TVS Jaú; by 1990, when the TVS brand was being phased out, its regional director was Luiz Henrique Mazzoni.

From 1990 to 2014, the station was named SBT Centro-Oeste Paulista. In 2005, a local business program, Visão de Mercado, which had been around since 2000, started to air on the station. The station announced a new transmitting tower alongside the municipal government in late July 2013.

At the end of 2014, SBT Jaú was renamed SBT Central and was installing its digital signal in its key coverage cities.

In 2022, the station was interested in changing satellites due to the old satellite being incompatible with the potential entrance of 5G technologies in Brazil, but still had no costs to cover the operation.
