= TV Piratini =

- Porto Alegre, Rio Grande do Sul; Brazil
- Channels: Analog: 5 (VHF)

Programming
- Affiliations: Rede Tupi

Ownership
- Owner: Diários Associados

History
- Founded: March 3, 1956
- First air date: December 20, 1959
- Last air date: July 18, 1980

Technical information
- Licensing authority: DENTEL

TV Piratini was a terrestrial television station licensed to Porto Alegre, capital of the state of Rio Grande do Sul. It was the first station outside of the Southeast region. It broadcast networked programming from Rede Tupi, of which it was an affiliate, as well as local programs. The station shut down alongside six other Tupi stations on July 18, 1980.

== History ==
The first attempts at bringing a television license to the state date back to 1951, when Armando Balvê showed his interest to president Juscelino Kubitschek for the granting of a television license. The license was later granted to Maurício Sirotsky in 1957, said license was what would be TV Gaúcha, which signed on in 1962, the forefather of the current RBS TV. Assis Chateaubriand anticipated Balvê's license and announced a license for TV Farroupilha in 1955, which he quit, when in 1956 the license of TV Piratini was created. A local businessman offered stocks for the station for interested businesses.

The first experiments conducted by Chateaubriand on April 23, 1955, were held in a closed circuit system, fed to fifty television sets. The station was founded on March 3, 1956, receiving a construction permit later. During planning stages, the station was supposed to broadcast on channel 4 (currently occupied by TV Pampa).

In 1958, during a radio variety show (Quando os galãs se encontram) on Rádio Farroupilha, Assis Cheateaubriand announced that TV Piratini was set to begin operations in December 1959.

In September 1959, sixteen radio staff received their television training in Rio de Janeiro, situation similar to another station that had yet to launch, TV Itapoan

The station shut down on at 11:55am on July 18, 1980. At the time the transmitters were being switched off, the station was airing a cartoon from Hanna-Barbera, when a Volkswagen car arrived with three technicians granted the order of turning off. Since this happened around lunch, most employees were outside the station's building, but escaped the press, unaware about the situation, believing that nothing happened.

The frequency was reactivated a year later as a station of SBT, currently SBT RS.
