= TV Norte Rondônia =

TV Norte Rondônia (ZYB 592)
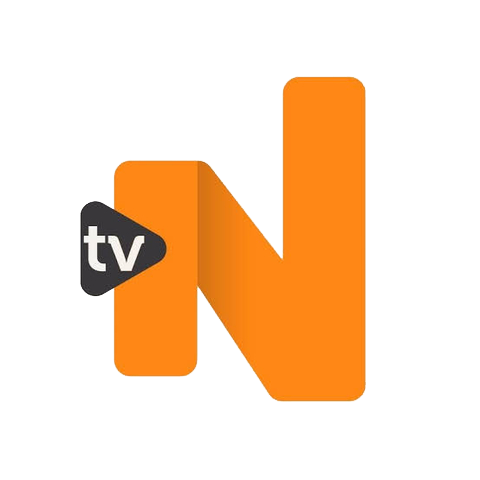

Porto Velho, Rondônia; Brazil
- Channels: Digital: 36 (UHF); Virtual: 13
- Branding: TV Norte Rondônia

Programming
- Affiliations: SBT

Ownership
- Owner: TV Norte; (Grupo Norte de Comunicação)
- Sister stations: Record News Rondônia; Parecis FM; Vitória Régia FM

History
- First air date: July 1988
- Former names: TV Allamanda (1988-2024)
- Former channel numbers: Analog: 13 (VHF, 1988-2018)

Technical information
- Licensing authority: ANATEL
- Transmitter coordinates: 8°46′31.6″S 63°52′52.2″W

Links
- Public license information: Profile

TV Norte Rondônia (channel 13) is a Brazilian television station licensed to Porto Velho, capital of the state of Rondônia, serving as an affiliate of SBT. The station is owned by Grupo Norte, and is part of TV Norte, an inter-regional group of SBT, Band and other affiliates concentrated in Northern Brazil.

== History ==
TV Allamanda foi founded in July 1988, relaying SBT's programming, on VHF channel 8, later moving to channel 13 at an unknown date. Its first local program was Estúdio Aberto, presented by Sérgio Valente. In 1990, it premiered TJ Allamanda and Bronca Livre, the latter of which presented by Francisco Rangel and Marcelo Reis.

On December 26, 2009, TV Allamanda's headquarters suffered a fire which destroyed its main studio, due to a short circuit happening after an electric discharge. This damaged its local programming, to the extent that the station had to improvise sets in other parts of the building. After a year of reforms, the station resumed its normal operations in 2011, while at the same time it presented its new schedule, replacing Allamanda Hoje with Allamanda Revista.

On November 21, 2023, TV Allamanda was acquired by Grupo Norte de Comunicação, a company from Manaus. Grupo Norte de Comunicação is responsible for SBT affiliates in the states of Acre, Amazonas, Tocantins ad Roraima, as well as controlling the Band affiliate in Roraima. On December 29, it was announced that the station would become TV Norte Rondônia, aligning itself with the protocols established by Grupo Norte. The rename took place on January 31, 2024.

== Technical information ==
Virtual channel	Digital channel	Aspect ratio	Content
13.1	36 UHF	1080i	TV Norte Rondônia/SBT's main programming

The station shut down its analog signal on August 14, 2018, when the city of Porto Velho did such in accordance with the ANATEL roadmap.
