= TV Difusora Sul =

TV Difusora Sul (ZYP 143)
- Imperatriz, Maranhão; Brazil
- Channels: Digital: 38 (UHF); Virtual: 7
- Branding: Difusora

Programming
- Affiliations: SBT

Ownership
- Owner: Sistema Difusora de Comunicação; (Rádio e TV Difusora do Maranhão Ltda.)

History
- First air date: 1983
- Former call signs: ZYA 657 (1989-2018)
- Former channel numbers: Analog: 7 (VHF, 1983–2018)
- Former affiliations: Rede Manchete (1983-1989)

Technical information
- Licensing authority: ANATEL
- ERP: 2,5 kW
- Transmitter coordinates: 5°32′4.5″S 47°28′58.9″W

Links
- Public license information: Profile
- Website: difusoraon.com

TV Difusora Sul is a Brazilian television station based in Imperatriz, a city in the state of Maranhão. It operates on channel 7 (UHF digital 38) and is affiliated to SBT. It is part of the Sistema Difusora de Comunicação and integrates Rede Difusora, generating its programming for the city of Imperatriz and nearby areas, also reaching parts of the far north of Tocantins.

== History ==
The station was founded in 1983 as TV Curimã, by businessmen Gilberto Bomtempo and Raimundo Cabeludo (the latter also a partner in TV Karajás and TV Tropical). At the time, the station broadcast the programming of the recently launched Rede Manchete on VHF channel 7. Its headquarters were located in the same building as Cultura FM (today Difusora FM), on Rua Simplício Moreira, in the city center. On August 23, 1988, President José Sarney granted a generator concession to TV Curimã, which is now managed by the politician and former mayor of Imperatriz Ribamar Ficane, in partnership with his wife, Zenira Ficane, as well as Lia Evangelista de Souza and Marcelo Rodrigues.

In 1989, the station left Manchete and became an affiliate of SBT, changing affiliation with TV Karajás. On August 15, 1990, the station changed its name to TV Alvorada, and in the same year, it moved to its current headquarters at Rua Monte Castelo, 207, modernized its equipment and hired new professionals. In 1992, TV Alvorada was renamed TV Difusora Imperatriz, starting to operate jointly with TV Difusora São Luís.

In 2006, Ribamar Ficane sold TV Difusora Imperatriz to Sistema Difusora de Comunicação. The new owner, Edinho Lobão, leases the station to businessman Ernani Ferraz, who renamed it TV Difusora Sul, at the same time making much of the programming independent of the headquarters in São Luís, and adopting a visual identity separate from the state capital's affiliate. In August 2007, Edinho regained control of the station, and the following year he was investigated by the Federal Public Ministry due to the illegal leasing of TV Difusora Sul.

In March 2016, like TV Difusora São Luís, TV Difusora Sul was leased by then federal deputy Weverton Rocha, represented by lawyer and businessman Willer Tomaz de Sousa, together with Difusora Sul FM. The station would come under definitive control of the new owners four years later, after the sale of Sistema Difusora de Comunicação in March 2020.

== Technical information ==
Virtual channel	Digital channel	Screen	Content
7.1	38 UHF	1080i	TV Difusora Sul/SBT's main schedule

The station began its digital transmissions on February 21, 2017, through UHF channel 38.

Based on the federal decree transitioning Brazilian TV stations from analog to digital signals, TV Difusora Sul, as well as the other stations in Imperatriz, ceased broadcasting on VHF channel 7 on December 17, 2018, following the official ANATEL roadmap. The station turned off the analog transmitter at 11:59pm, without inserting the shutdown slide.

== Programming ==
=== Local ===
- Bandeira 2 (local edition);
- Hora D (local edition);
- Mesa de Boteco: music (local)

=== Relayed from TV Difusora São Luís ===
- Bom Dia Maranhão
- Jornal da Difusora
- Em Alta
- Nossa Manhã
- Maranhão Rural

=== Former ===
- Alvorada Sertaneja
- Aqui Agora
- Bastidores da Noite
- Beto Mania Show
- Bom Dia Maranhão do Sul
- Bom Dia Tocantins
- Cultura na TV
- Difusora Comunidade
- Difusora Debate
- Difusora Repórter
- Difusora Rural
- Jornal da Difusora
- Noticentro
- Por Aí
- Ronda Cidadã
- Sabadão Difusora
- Show de Ofertas
- TJ Notícias
- Vida Saudável
