= Guarantã do Norte =

- Municipality
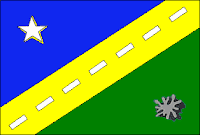
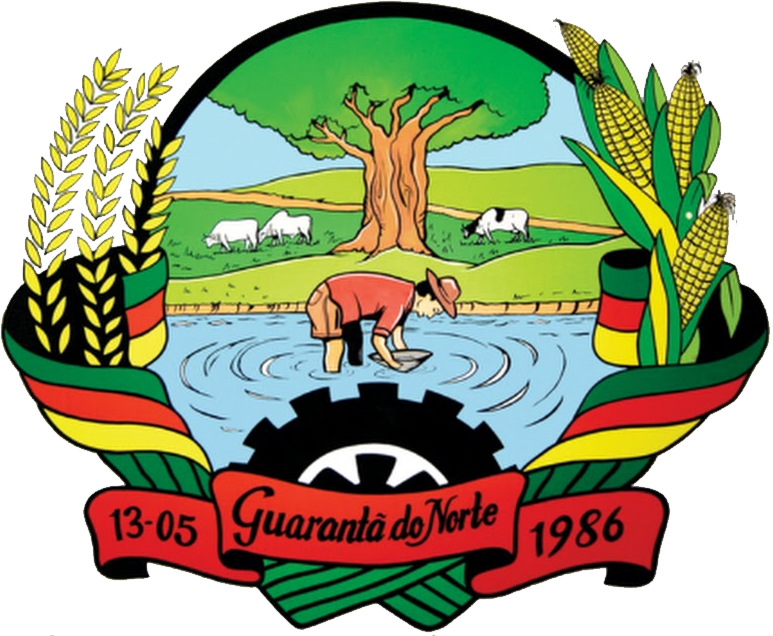
- Flag Coat of arms

- Location in Mato Grosso state

- Location in Brazil
- Coordinates: 9°54′16″S 54°54′36″W
- Country: Brazil
- Region: Central-West
- State: Mato Grosso

Population (2020)
  - Total: 36,130
- Time zone: UTC−3 (BRT)

Guarantã do Norte is a municipality located in Mato Grosso state, Brazil approximately 780 km (480 mi) from Cuiabá.

Population: 36,130 inhabitants

Total area: 2,767 km^{2} (1,068 sq mi)

The municipality borders Pará state. It was granted the status of municipality on 13 May 1986.
