= Vargem Grande =

- Municipality
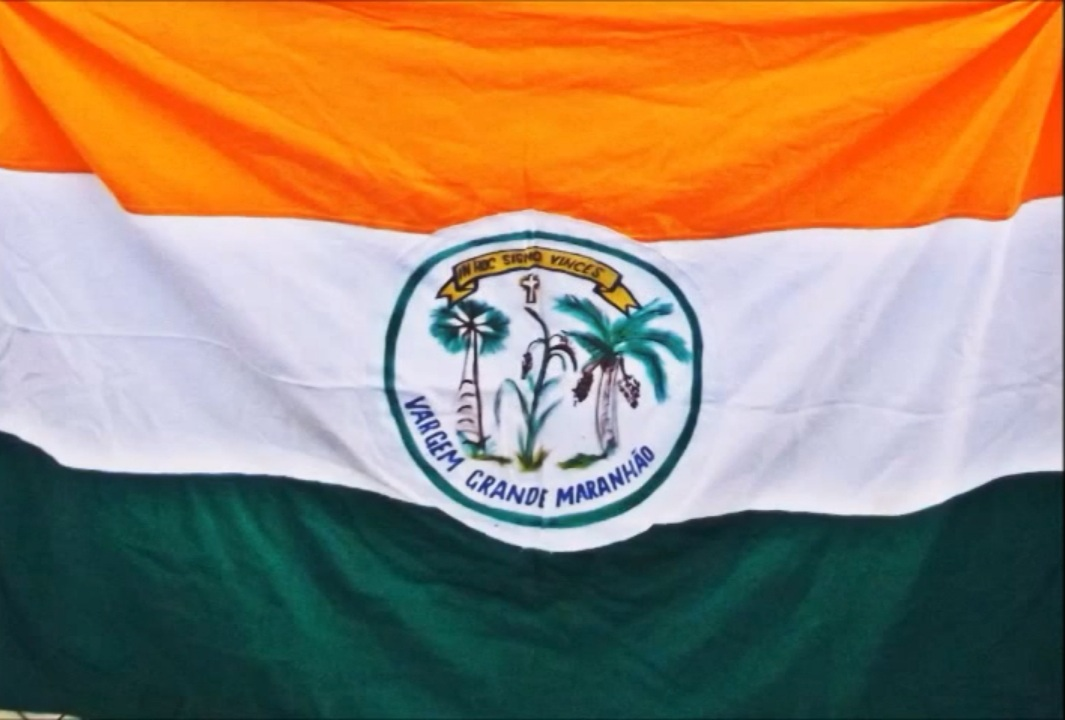
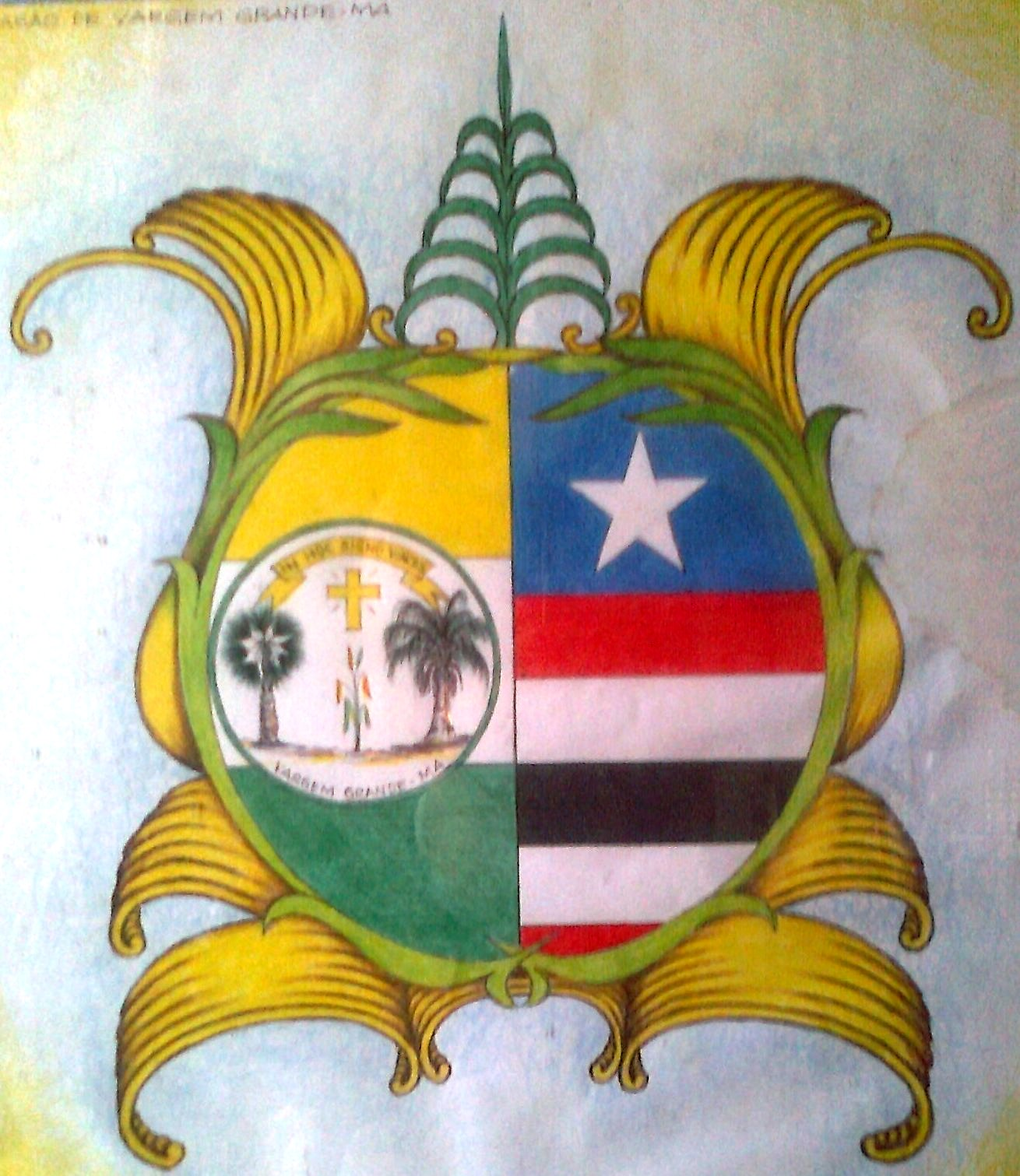
- Flag Coat of arms

- Location in Maranhão state

- Location in Brazil
- Coordinates: 3°32′35″S 43°54′57″W
- Country: Brazil
- Region: Northeast
- State: Maranhão

Area
  - Total: 1,958 km^{2} (756 sq mi)

Population (2020)
  - Total: 57,168
  - Density: 29.20/km^{2} (75.62/sq mi)
- Time zone: UTC−3 (BRT)

Vargem Grande is a city in Maranhão state. Its population is 57,168 (2020) and its total area is 1,958 km^{2}.
