= TV Vitoriosa =

TV Vitoriosa (ZYA 733)
- Ituiutaba, Minas Gerais; Brazil
- Channels: Digital: 32 (UHF); Virtual: 3.1

Programming
- Affiliations: Sistema Brasileiro de Televisão

Ownership
- Sister stations: Bons Ventos FM • Rádio Vitoriosa

History
- Founded: 1989
- Former names: TV Cancella (1989-1999)

Technical information
- Licensing authority: ANATEL

TV Vitoriosa is a Brazilian television station based in Ituiutaba, Minas Gerais. It operates on channel 32 UHF digital and is affiliated with Sistema Brasileiro de Televisão. TV Vitoriosa also has a branch in Uberlândia where most of the programming is generated.

== History ==
The station was inaugurated in 1989 by businessman José Manuel Pinheiro as TV Cancella (name inherited from Rádio Cancella). In 1999, the station was sold to the entrepreneur Wellington Salgado de Oliveira. On September 30, 1999, it was renamed TV Vitoriosa.

== Technical Information ==
Virtual Channel	Digital Channel	Resolution	Programming
3.1	32 UHF	1080i	Main program of TV Vitoriosa / SBT

TV Vitoriosa started its digital broadcasts on January 7, 2015, by channel 32 UHF. On the same day, the digital relay of Uberlândia also started to operate by channel 32 UHF.

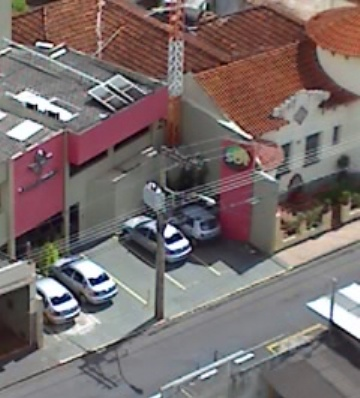
Branch station in Uberlândia
