= TV Norte Pará =

TV Norte Pará (ZYB 618)
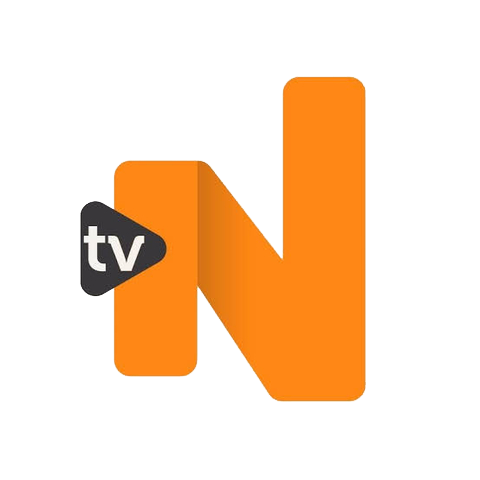
- Belém, Pará; Brazil
- Channels: Digital: 26 (UHF); Virtual: 5

Programming
- Affiliations: SBT

Ownership
- Owner: Grupo Norte de Comunicação Grupo Silvio Santos; (TVSBT Canal 5 de Belém S/A)

History
- First air date: September 2, 1981
- Former names: TVS Belém (1981–1990); SBT Belém (1990–2012); SBT Pará (2012–2025)
- Former channel numbers: Analog: 2 (VHF, 1981) 5 (VHF, 1981–2018)

Technical information
- Licensing authority: ANATEL
- ERP: 10 kW
- Transmitter coordinates: 1°27′24.3″S 48°29′39.6″W

Links
- Website: www.sbt.com.br

TV Norte Pará is a Brazilian television station headquartered in Belém, the capital of the state of Pará. It broadcasts on channel 5 (digital UHF channel 26) and is affiliated with SBT. The station belongs to Grupo Norte de Comunicação, in partnership with Grupo Silvio Santos, and is managed by Grupo Norte.

== History ==
The station's former frequency, channel 2, was occupied by TV Marajoara from 30 September 1961 to the early hours of 18 July 1980. The station was owned by Diários Associados and was one of the seven stations that shut down alongside Rede Tupi. TV Marajoara was the first to go off air on the morning of 18 July without starting that day's programs.

In March 1981, Silvio Santos obtained the former TV Marajoara license to operate a new station, which would become a charter affiliate of the new SBT network, and, consequently, one of its O&Os. The license started regular broadcasts on 2 September 1981, two weeks after the launch of the network; in late September, the station moved from channel 2 to channel 5, while channel 2 would later be occupied by TV Cultura do Pará in 1987. The station used the TVS nomenclature until 1990, when it was replaced by SBT.

On 23 April 2014, its newscast SBT Pará was now presented by Valdo Souza, replacing Nyelsen Martins, its former presenter. On 6 June 2016, the station hired Alinne Passos, formerly of Record Belém. He was replaced by Nara Bandeira in 2021.

On 11 November 2024, SBT fired most of its staff in Belém, as part of a policy to cut costs, including the exit of Nara Bandeira. Her post on SBT Pará was replaced by Bianca Teixeira, who used to be Nara's substitute presenter.

On 15 August 2025, SBT Pará ceased operating as a directly owned station of the Sistema Brasileiro de Televisão (SBT) and became a regional affiliate. Grupo Norte entered into a partnership with the Belém station, assuming responsibility for investments in production, content, and commercial strategy. The arrangement is overseen by Sérgio Bringel and Elton Bittencourt. The change is part of SBT’s broader restructuring in the North Region. SBT Pará now joins Grupo Norte’s network of affiliates, which also serves the states of Acre, Amazonas, Rondônia, Roraima, Tocantins, and Paraíba. The station will undergo structural adjustments and modifications to its regional programming.

=== TV Norte Pará (2025–present) ===
On 27 August 2025, SBT Pará changed its name to TV Norte Pará.

== Technical information ==
SBT Pará started digital broadcasts on UHF channel 26 (virtual 5.1) on 2 June 2014. Local HD output started on 4 August; the official confirmation came on August 25, as part of a plan implemented by five SBT O&Os.

When Brazil adopted daylight savings (until 2019), SBT Pará was responsible for generating a special feed for states in the North and Northeast regions that did not observe it, by airing certain programs with a one-hour delay.

The station shut down its analog signal on 30 May 2018, according to the official ANATEL roadmap.
