= Record Goiás =

Record Goiás (ZYA 572)
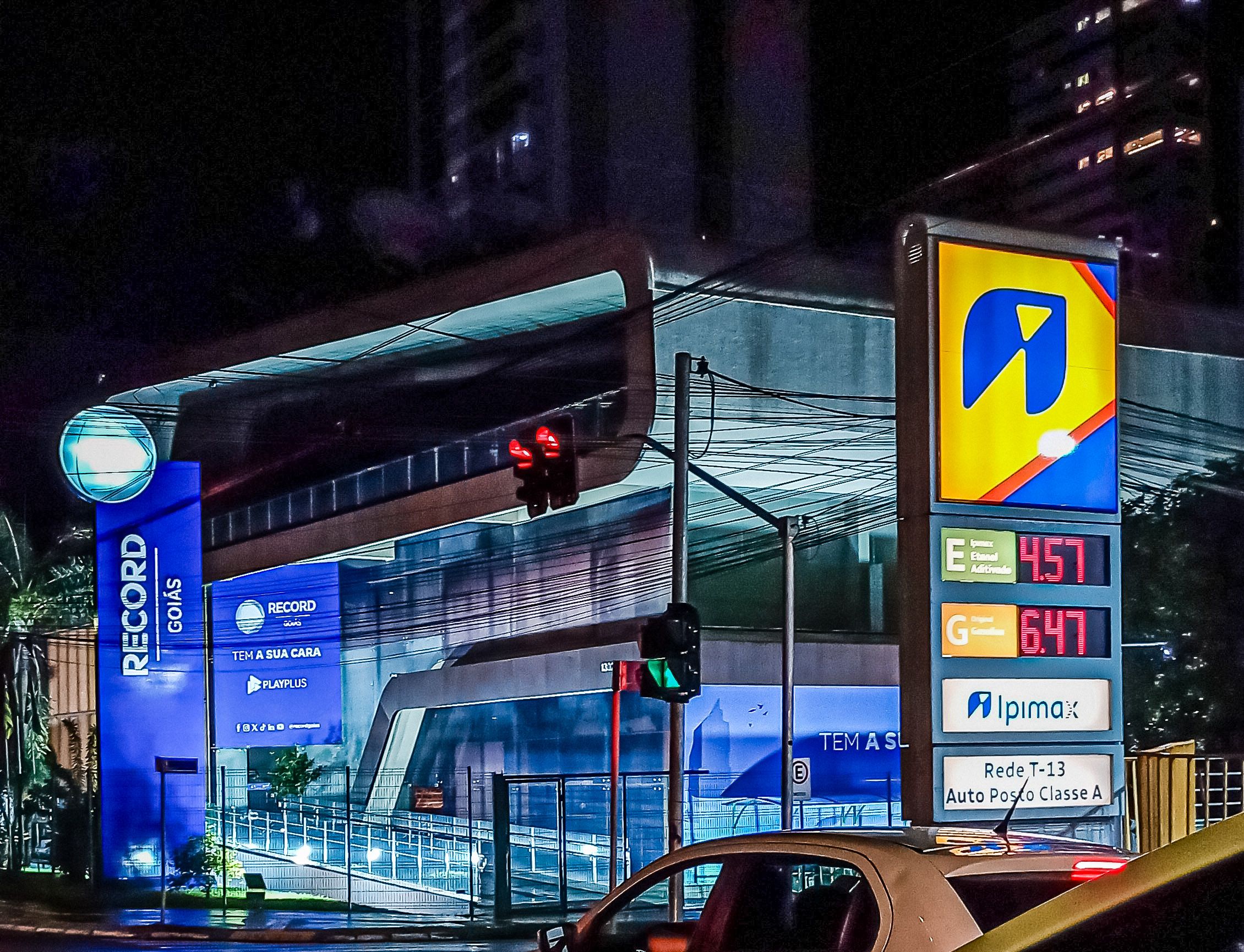

Goiânia, Goiás; Brazil
- Channels: Digital: 18 (UHF); Virtual: 4

Programming
- Affiliations: Record

Ownership
- Owner: Grupo Record; (Televisão Goyá Ltda.)

History
- First air date: December 7, 1961
- Former names: TV Rádio Clube (1961-1963); TV Goiânia (1963-1976); TV Goyá (1976-1991); TV Record Goiás (1991-2016); RecordTV Goiás (2016-2023)
- Former channel numbers: Analog: 4 (VHF, 1961–2017)
- Former affiliations: Rede Tupi (1961-1980); TVS-Record (1980-1981); SBT (1981-1988); TV Rio (1988-1991)

Technical information
- Licensing authority: ANATEL
- ERP: 6 kW
- Transmitter coordinates: 16°39′52.6″S 49°20′31.5″W

Links
- Public license information: Profile
- Website: record.r7.com/record-emissoras/centro-oeste/record-goias/

Record Goiás (channel 4) is a Brazilian television station based in Goiânia, capital of the state of Goiás serving as an owned-and-operated station of Record television network for most of the state. Its studios are located in the Bueno sector, while its transmitting antenna is in Morro do Mendanha, in the Jardim Petrópolis neighborhood.

== History ==
"You are watching the image of TV Rádio Clube on an experimental basis. We will be broadcasting it from tomorrow, definitively."

— Juvenal de Barros, radio host at Rádio Clube de Goiânia, during the experimental broadcast of TV Rádio Clube, the day before its inauguration.

The station was inaugurated on September 7, 1961, as TV Rádio Clube (in reference to its sister radio station), the first TV station in the state of Goiás, and the ninth television station of the Diários Associados conglomerate. Initially, it transmitted on VHF channel 7, later on VHF channel 9, until it permanently moved to VHF channel 4, still in 1961. Its studios initially operated in the Goianazes Building, in the university sector, together with Rádio Clube and the newspaper Folha de Goyaz.

Its programming was initially done live, as there was no videotape, in addition to the structure being completely precarious, with only a single camera to transmit the entire program. However, the broadcaster achieved certain audience ratings, even having partnerships with local businesses, and even with competition from TV Anhanguera from 1963 onwards, it led easily. That same year, it was renamed TV Goiânia.

At this time, the management of the station, as well as the other Diários Associados vehicles in Goiânia, became the responsibility of the lawyer and journalist Francisco Braga Sobrinho. At the end of the decade, it began to mix its programming with that of TV Tupi São Paulo, and also evolved technically with the arrival of videotape. The station went through several massive changes at the end of the 1960s and throughout the 1970s, such as the increase in the power of its transmitter, which, according to advertisements at the time, reached 65 cities, although its signal had irregular reception in its own territory. capital. Part of the national programming began to be received by satellite, and local programming continued to be mixed with the content from the then newly created Rede Tupi de Televisão in 1972.

Even though it had been on the air for around 15 years, the broadcaster did not have a license to operate, a situation that was similar to that of its sister TV Vitória, in Vitória, Espírito Santo, which was only regularized in 1979. President Ernesto Geisel granted the concession of channel 4 VHF on June 22, 1976, for Televisão Goyá Ltda. Thus, TV Goiânia was renamed TV Goyá. The old name would later be reused in another station started by the same conglomerate, opened in 1996 (which was a former TV Brasília relayer). At the end of the 1970s, the station moved from its old facilities in the University Sector, and divided its departments throughout the city, with the departure of its department of journalism to the Serrinha neighborhood, and from its studios to Jardim Petrópolis, in a building adjacent to its transmitters at the top of Morro do Mendanha.

On July 18, 1980, Rede Tupi ceased broadcasting after a decree published two days earlier by the Federal Government in the Official Gazette of the Union declared seven stations' licenses revoked due to social security debts and financial corruption. Of the 14 O&Os that made up the Tupi network, TV Goyá was one of the remaining seven that were saved from revocation because they were up to date with their accounts and financially healthy. After the end of the pioneer, the station began to temporarily retransmit programming from TV Record and TVS Rio de Janeiro. In 1981, after the creation of SBT, it became one of its first affiliates.

At this time, the station went through a period of decline, which was symbolized by the shutdown of Rede Tupi and the rise of TV Anhanguera as an affiliate of Rede Globo and audience leader, as well as having a coverage area greater than that of channel 4 with several stations spread throughout the interior. In 1983, still suffering from the financial crisis, Diários Associados sold TV Goyá to businessman and then federal deputy Múcio Athayde, owner of Grupo Desenvolvimento. At the time, director Robson José Dias took over management of the station.

Involved in several scandals, the most notorious being the construction of Centro da Barra (Athaydeville), which ended unfinished, and the bankruptcy of some of his companies, Athayde had several problems regarding the right to administer the TV Goyá concession, which he intended to use together with other communication vehicles owned by him in Goiás and the Federal District to create an electoral base that would enable his candidacy for the Federal Senate in the 1986 elections, which however was challenged by the TRE due to several irregularities.

Still in the 1980s, the station moved its news editorial office from its old headquarters in Serrinha (which today houses TV Goiânia) to a new address in Praça Tamandaré, in the West sector. In 1988, TV Goyá lost its affiliation with SBT to its future competitor, TV Serra Dourada, which would be opened the following year. The broadcaster then partners with TV Rio in the project of a mini-network, through a partnership between Athayde and pastor Nilson Fanini, starting with independent programming based on local programs, music videos and imported programming, on July 1 of that year.

In 1991, with the failure of the project and the intention of moving outside the country, Athayde negotiated his TV stations with the businessman and leader of the Universal Church of the Kingdom of God, Edir Macedo, owner of Rede Record, which was beginning the expansion of its signal across the country. In September, TV Goyá began broadcasting Record's programming, becoming TV Record Goiás, the network's fourth owned-and-operated station and the first to be acquired by Grupo Record — TV Rio would be integrated into the network in 1992, becoming its Rio branch after the group acquired the 49% that was owned by Athayde.

During this period, under the direction of Luiz Cláudio Costa, the broadcaster underwent several reformulations, eliminating much of its local programming, and in 1995, it brought together all its departments in a new headquarters in the Business Center Building, located a few blocks away. where the channel's old offices were located in the West sector. At the end of the 1990s and beginning of the 2000s, it expanded its coverage area into the interior, installing retransmitters in the state's main cities.

In 2006, like the network's other stations, it received several investments, with the modernization of its structure and the reformulation of local programming. On June 22, 2011, the local executive direction of the station was replaced by the former director of Record News, Luciano Ribeiro Neto, replacing Mafran Dutra, who would return to Rede Record to assume superintendence of the station.

In 2012, with the success of its news programs, TV Record Goiás began to actively compete for audience leadership in Greater Goiânia against TV Anhanguera. In March 2014, all of its local programs reached leadership, and for the first time, it was also leader in the daily average between 7am and 12am, being the only Record station in the 15 markets measured by IBOPE to win this feat until 2018, when RecordTV Itapoan also became the leader in Greater Salvador. Still in 2014, the station migrated from the Business Center Building to the former Espaço Ambientar, in the Bueno sector, purchased in 2011 and after a period of renovations, it became its new headquarters on June 5. On November 24, 2016, with the reformulation of the network's brand, the station was renamed RecordTV Goiás, from November 2023, it became Record Goiás.

== Technical information ==
Virtual channel	Digital channel	Screen	Content
4.1	18 UHF	1080i	Record Goiás/Record's programming
