= TV Anhanguera Goiânia =

TV Anhanguera Goiânia (ZYP 327)
- Goiânia, Goiás; Brazil
- Channels: Digital: 34 (UHF); Virtual: 4
- Branding: TV Anhanguera

Programming
- Affiliations: TV Globo

Ownership
- Owner: Grupo Zahran; (Televisão Anhanguera S.A.)

History
- Founded: October 23, 1963
- First air date: October 24, 1963
- Former call signs: ZYA 571 (1963-2017)
- Former names: TV Anhaguera (1963-2012)
- Former channel numbers: Analog: 2 (VHF, 1963–2017)
- Former affiliations: TV Excelsior (1963-1968)

Technical information
- Licensing authority: ANATEL
- ERP: 20 kW
- Transmitter coordinates: 16°39′52.3″S 49°20′41.6″W

Links
- Public license information: Profile
- Website: redeglobo.globo.com/tvanhanguera

TV Anhanguera Goiânia is a Brazilian television station based in Goiânia, capital of the state of Goiás. It operates on virtual channel 2 (physical channel 34 UHF), and is affiliated with TV Globo. Owned by Rede Centro América de Comunicação since 2026, it is the main station of Rede Anhanguera, a regional television network that covers the states of Goiás and Tocantins. He is the network head of TV Anhanguera in the state of Goiás, which broadcasts its programming to the network's other seven stations in the state, in Anápolis, Catalão, Itumbiara, Jataí, Luziânia, Porangatu and Rio Verde. Its studios are based in the Serrinha neighborhood, and its transmission antenna is in Morro do Mendanha, in the Jardim Petrópolis neighborhood.

== History ==
TV Anhanguera went on air on Channel 2 on October 24, 1963, the date of Goiânia's anniversary by Jaime Câmara and his brothers Joaquim Câmara Filho and Vicente Rebouças, becoming the second station to go on air in Goiás (the first was TV Rádio Clube, currently Record Goiás, in 1961). The station went on air as an affiliate of Rede Excelsior.

Initially, the station was situated on Rua 8 in the city center, behind the O Popular newspaper building, at Avenida Goiás, 345. Its inaugural program, A Hora do Ângelus, aired for nearly 50 years, concluding in 2012. The network's programming encompassed various attractions, ranging from auditorium programs to soap operas, including Drácula and The Brodie Family.

In 1967, it suffered a devastating fire, resulting in losses of NCr$1 billion. He had help from the then TV Goiânia and TV Paranaense (currently RPC Curitiba) to return to the air, two weeks later. After the fire, the station moved to a building on Rua 2. The advertising market also came together to help the company get back on its feet. The advertiser, Feud Naciff, was the one who raised the idea that advertisers should pay normally to the company, so that it would have credits for its recovery. After resuming its broadcasts, it became the leading television station - up until then, TV Rádio Clube (TV Goyá, channel 4) took the spot.

In 1968, with the worsening situation at Rede Excelsior, it began broadcasting Rede Globo programs. Since its inauguration, TV Anhanguera already had videotape equipment.

The affiliation with the Rio network began in 1969, when it began broadcasting Jornal Nacional and also began receiving Globo programs via Embratel microwaves during the early hours of the morning (only JN was live). At that time, Anhanguera still applied local programs, such as República Livre do Cerrado, a variety show presented by Colonel Hipopota (local equivalent of Chacrinha) until his death in 1982; 'The World belongs to Children', a children's show presented by Magda Santos until 1976; "General Novilar Comanda o Espetáculo, presented by Fued Naciff, was a great success, delivering several prizes and helping those in need; Juventude Comanda presented by Arthur Rezende, in addition to small news bulletins, such as O Popular no 2.

With the consolidation of the Globo standard, local programs slowly disappeared, leaving a few regional programs and television news programs, such as Fatos em Manchete, Jornalismo Eletrônico (Globo's old standard of local television journalism), Retrospectiva, Jornal do Campo and the local slots of Jornal Hoje and Jornal Nacional, presented by Jackson Abrão, José Divino and Paulo Beringhs.

From 1980 onwards, Anhanguera, already affiliated with Globo, changed its headquarters, moving from the center of Goiânia to the distant Serrinha (today a semi-upscale neighborhood). In 1981, the Feminina program appeared, created by Célia Câmara, which dealt with themes related to the feminine universe. On August 19, TV Anhanguera was the broadcaster responsible for generating images of the award ceremony for Redes SBT and Manchete, directly from Brasília.

In 1983, the television news programs Bom Dia Goiás and Jornal Anhanguera were created, with three daily editions. In 1987, Jornal Anhanguera: Edição do Almolo or Jornal do Almoço, as it became known, launched. Currently, it is called Jornal Anhanguera 1ª Edição. In 1993, Jornal do Campo was relaunched.

In 2000, the station began to adopt the new standard of local television journalism used by Globo stations, "community journalism" and reformulated the two editions of Jornal Anhanguera, which gained a new set. It was the first broadcaster in the state to broadcast matches from the Goiano Football Championship, from 2001 to 2003 and since 2007. It usually broadcasts one match for the network in the inland, and another for Goiânia and the region.

On July 5, 2010, TV Anhanguera reformulated the sets of its news programs, adopting an editorial line similar to the set used by RJTV, from 2009 to 2011. The newscast became more informal and gained more agility. On October 24, 2012, Rede Anhanguera launched the new logo during Jornal Anhanguera - 1st edition, with features similar to those of Rede Globo.

On February 2, 2019, the station premiered Bom Dia Sábado, presented by Terciane Fernandes. On May 4, the program No Balaio premiered, presented by Ana Clara Paim and "Seu Waldemar", showing the state's cultural diversity and on April 9, 2020, Matheus Ribeiro resigned from the station, due to internal problems, in his place, Luciano Cabral (ex-GloboNews) who had been doing JA2, for the other stations, now replaces him.

== Technical information ==
Virtual channel	Digital channel	Screen resolution	Programming
2.1	34 UHF	1080i	TV Anhanguera/Globo's main programming

TV Anhanguera Goiânia was the first of Rede Globo's affiliates to start its digital transmissions, through channel 34 UHF on August 4, 2008. This required high investments in equipment and also in the renovation of its facilities. On June 4, 2012, all of its programs began to be produced in high definition.

Based on the federal decree transitioning Brazilian TV stations from analogue to digital signals, TV Anhanguera Goiânia, as well as the other stations in Goiânia, ceased broadcasting on VHF channel 2 on June 21, 2017, following the official schedule from ANATEL. The signal was cut off at 11:59 pm, during Profissão Repórter, and was replaced by a warning from MCTIC and ANATEL about the switch-off.
