= TV Clube (Ribeirão Preto) =

TV Clube (ZYB 868)
- Ribeirão Preto, São Paulo; Brazil
- Channels: Digital: 16 (UHF); Virtual: 9

Programming
- Affiliations: Rede Bandeirantes

Ownership
- Owner: Sistema Clube de Comunicação

History
- First air date: May 1988
- Former names: TV Ribeirão (1988-1989)
- Former channel numbers: Analog: 17 (VHF, 1988-2018)

Technical information
- Licensing authority: ANATEL
- ERP: 1.4 kW
- Transmitter coordinates: 21°9′25.2″S 47°54′5.8″W

Links
- Public license information: Profile
- Website: clube.com.br#tv-clube

TV Clube (channel 9) is a television station in Ribeirão Preto, São Paulo, Brazil, affiliated with Rede Bandeirantes and owned by Sistema Clube de Comunicação. The station covers 82 municipalities of northeastern São Paulo, as well as having an office in São Carlos, created in 2013. Its studios are located at Jardim Sumaré, and its transmitting antenna is in the Vila Monte Alegre neighborhood.

== History ==
In 1987, the owners of the Sistema Clube group (owners of Rádio Clube, the first inland radio station in Brazil) obtained the license for VHF channel 9 in Ribeirão Preto. TV Clube signed on in May 1988, initially as a Rede Manchete affiliate, before moving to Rede Bandeirantes in 1993. The launch of the station caused SCC to open a video production company (SCC Vídeo).

On May 4, 2022, its founder José Inácio Gennari Pizani died.

== Technical information ==
Subchannels of TV Clube
Channel	Res.	Content
9.1	1080i	TV Clube / Band's main schedule

TV Clube started digital broadcasts in March 2010, on UHF channel 16, becoming one of the first Band affiliates in inland São Paulo to broadcast in HD..

The station shut down its analog signal on UHF channel 17 on February 21, the same day Ribeirão Preto closed its analog signals per the official ANATEL roadmap.

== Awards ==
Vladimir Herzog Award

Year	Category	Work	Author	Result	Ref.
2010	Menção Honrosa por Fotografia	"Série Sertão Nordestino"	Kaká Trovo	Winner	
