= SBT Brasília =

SBT Brasília (ZYP 306)
- Brasília, Federal District; Brazil
- Channels: Digital: 24 (UHF); Virtual: 12
- Branding: SBT Brasília

Programming
- Affiliations: Sistema Brasileiro de Televisão

Ownership
- Owner: Grupo Silvio Santos; (TV Studios de Brasília Ltda.)

History
- First air date: July 14, 1986
- Former call signs: ZYB 509 (1986-2018)
- Former names: TVS Brasília (1986-1990); SBT Distrito Federal
- Former channel numbers: Analog: 12 (VHF, 1986-2016)

Technical information
- Licensing authority: ANATEL
- ERP: 3 kW
- Transmitter coordinates: 15°41′57.3″S 47°49′46.6″W

Links
- Public license information: Profile
- Website: sbt.com.br/brasilia/home

SBT Brasília (channel 12) is a Brazilian television station headquartered in Brasília, Federal District. It operates on channel 12 (24 UHF digital), and is a SBT-owned station. Due to reception difficulties in some areas, it also operates a relay on UHF channel 27 in Gama. The station maintains its studios in the Palácio da Imprensa Building, located in the Setor de Rádio e Televisão Sul (SRTVS), in the Asa Sul of Plano Piloto, and its transmitters are in the Brasília Digital TV Tower, in the administrative region of Lago Norte.

== History ==
VHF channel 12 in Brasília was originally granted to Rede Bandeirantes, after a bidding process in which Rede Manchete also took part, in late 1984, and served to implement the future TV Bandeirantes Brasília. However, president João Figueiredo cancelled the license due to the news coverage the network was doing, which was openly favorable to the redemocratization of the country, and re-licensed 12 (Figueiredo later reverted his decision and granted a new channel for Bandeirantes on the eve of the end of his mandate, on March 13, 1985).

After the new process, SBT received the license on January 31, 1985. Until then, the network's affiliate in the Federal District was TV Brasília, which became a Rede Manchete affiliate on July 1. However, on track of its inauguration, TVS Brasília also lost its license, after minister of communications Antônio Carlos Magalhães decided to re-examine all 140 radio and television licenses approved by former president Figueiredo, between October 1, 1984 and March 15, 1985. The decision was giving monthly losses off 200 million cruzeiros to SBT.

Still in the same year, Silvio Santos met with president José Sarney to discuss the question, and told Jornal do Brasil that he forbade SBT's journalists to criticize the government. On October 30, the Ministry of Communications told that SBT and Rede Manchete's licenses in Brasília were kept, and that president José Sarney "showed interest in helping the Silvio Santos business group, the only one capable to avoid Globo's monopoly".

Finally, after a test period which started on June 8, only with national programming, TVS Brasília was officially inaugurated on July 14, 1986, holding a cocktail at Academia de Tênis, where the owner of SBT, Silvio Santos, directors of the network and president José Sarney, among other invitees, were present.

With its creation, SBT planned to centralize its national news department in the federal capital, unlike the other networks, who limited to São Paulo and Rio de Janeiro, however, that never happened. In 1990, SBT discontinued the TVS brand in its local stations, and the station was renamed SBT Brasília.

== Technical information ==
| Virtual channel | Digital channel | Aspect ratio | Content |
|---|---|---|---|
| 12.1 | 24 UHF | 1080i | SBT Brasília/SBT's main schedule |

The station started its digital broadcasts on October 12, 2009, through UHF channel 24. On August 4, 2014, alongside SBT's other O&Os, it started to air its local programming in high definition. Official confirmation, however, only came on August 25.
