= SBT São Paulo =

SBT São Paulo (ZYB 855)
Osasco–São Paulo; Brazil
- Channels: Digital: 28 (UHF); Virtual: 4
- Branding: SBT

Programming
- Affiliations: SBT

Ownership
- Owner: Grupo Silvio Santos; (TVSBT Canal 4 de São Paulo S/A)

History
- First air date: 19 August 1981
- Former names: TVS São Paulo (1981-1990)
- Former channel numbers: Analog: 4 (VHF, 1981–2017)

Technical information
- Licensing authority: ANATEL
- ERP: 23 kW
- Transmitter coordinates: 23°32′40.9″S 46°40′54.1″W

Links
- Public license information: Profile
- Website: www.sbt.com.br/home

SBT São Paulo (channel 4) is a Brazilian television station licensed to São Paulo that serves as the flagship station of the television network SBT, a company of the Grupo Silvio Santos, serving Greater São Paulo. Its studios are located at the CDT da Anhanguera, in the Anhanguera Industrial District, in Osasco, and its transmission antenna, the Assis Chateaubriand Tower, is in the Sumaré neighborhood, in the capital of São Paulo.

== History ==
Plunged into a serious financial crisis, TV Tupi São Paulo, the first television station in Brazil and head of the network of Rede Tupi, had the concession of VHF channel 4 revoked on July 18, 1980, after the Federal Government published it in the Official Gazette of the Union the decree that declared peremptory (non-renewable) the concession of it and 6 other stations that make up the network due to debts with social security and financial corruption. On the same day, DENTEL technicians sealed the transmitters of the broadcaster and its sisters, extinguishing Rede Tupi.

Days later, on July 23, the Federal Government opened a competition for concessions for Rede Tupi, the also extinct TV Excelsior in São Paulo, as well as another channel in Rio de Janeiro, which would take place in September of that year. On March 19, 1981, communications minister Haroldo Corrêa de Mattos announced in a press conference that Silvio Santos and Adolpho Bloch emerged as the winners of the competition. Silvio wins Rede Tupi concessions in the cities of São Paulo (TV Tupi São Paulo), Porto Alegre (TV Piratini) and Belém (TV Marajoara), in addition to channel 9 in Rio de Janeiro (which is currently CNT Rio de Janeiro) . Bloch, with the other five concessions he obtained, would found Rede Manchete in 1983.

Silvio also incorporated into the assets of the future broadcaster the studios of the former Tele-Centro of Rede Tupi and the Torre Assis Chateaubriand (still under construction) at Rua Catalão, nº 75, in the Sumaré neighborhood, which joined the structure that was already used by TVS Rio de Janeiro (existing since 1976) in the capital of São Paulo, such as the Silvio Santos Theater in the Carandiru neighborhood and a group building located in Osasco, where the administrative part was located. An 11,000 m^{2} building was also acquired on Rua Dona Santa Veloso, nº 575 in the Vila Guilherme neighborhood, where the former TV Excelsior studios had operated until its closure in 1970, and a scenery factory was also built on Rua dos Camarés, in Carandiru. In total, the future TVS São Paulo would operate in 5 different locations, which at that time did not seem to be a difficulty for its operation.

TVS São Paulo officially went on air at 9:30 am on August 19, 1981, as the network head of the Brazilian Television System, and together with TVS Rio de Janeiro and 4 other broadcasters that were previously affiliates of the Rede de Emissoras Independentes (led by TV Record São Paulo, of which Silvio Santos was a shareholder), and another 5 broadcasters from Diários Associados that had been saved from the revocation of Rede Tupi. With the support of TV Anhanguera, the broadcaster broadcast directly from Brasília the signing of its concession between Silvio Santos and minister Haroldo Corrêa de Mattos, being the first in the world to accomplish such a feat.

Just like TVS Rio de Janeiro, from where the São Paulo broadcaster inherited all of its programming, TVS São Paulo's schedule consisted of auditorium programs, canned programs such as North American films and series, comedy programs, children's programs, among others. Its schedule did not have local programs, the exception being O Povo na TV, which at the end of 1981 started to have a different version from the one made in Rio de Janeiro. With a schedule practically aimed at the public of classes C and D, TVS São Paulo quickly became popular, reaching second place in audience ratings in Greater São Paulo until the end of the 1980s, although its revenue was low and Most advertisers sought out competing channels.

On November 24, 1989, the station was off the air for 18 minutes, between 6:56 pm and 7:14 pm, interrupting its programming and also SBT's national network broadcast. The incident occurred after Eletropaulo interrupted the electricity supply in Vila Guilherme due to the storm that was occurring at the time. The broadcaster even activated the emergency generator, but to avoid overload due to several studios being used at the same time, it had to be turned off.
