= Presidente Dutra, Maranhão =

Coordinates: 5.29°S 44.49°W

Presidente Dutra
- Municipality
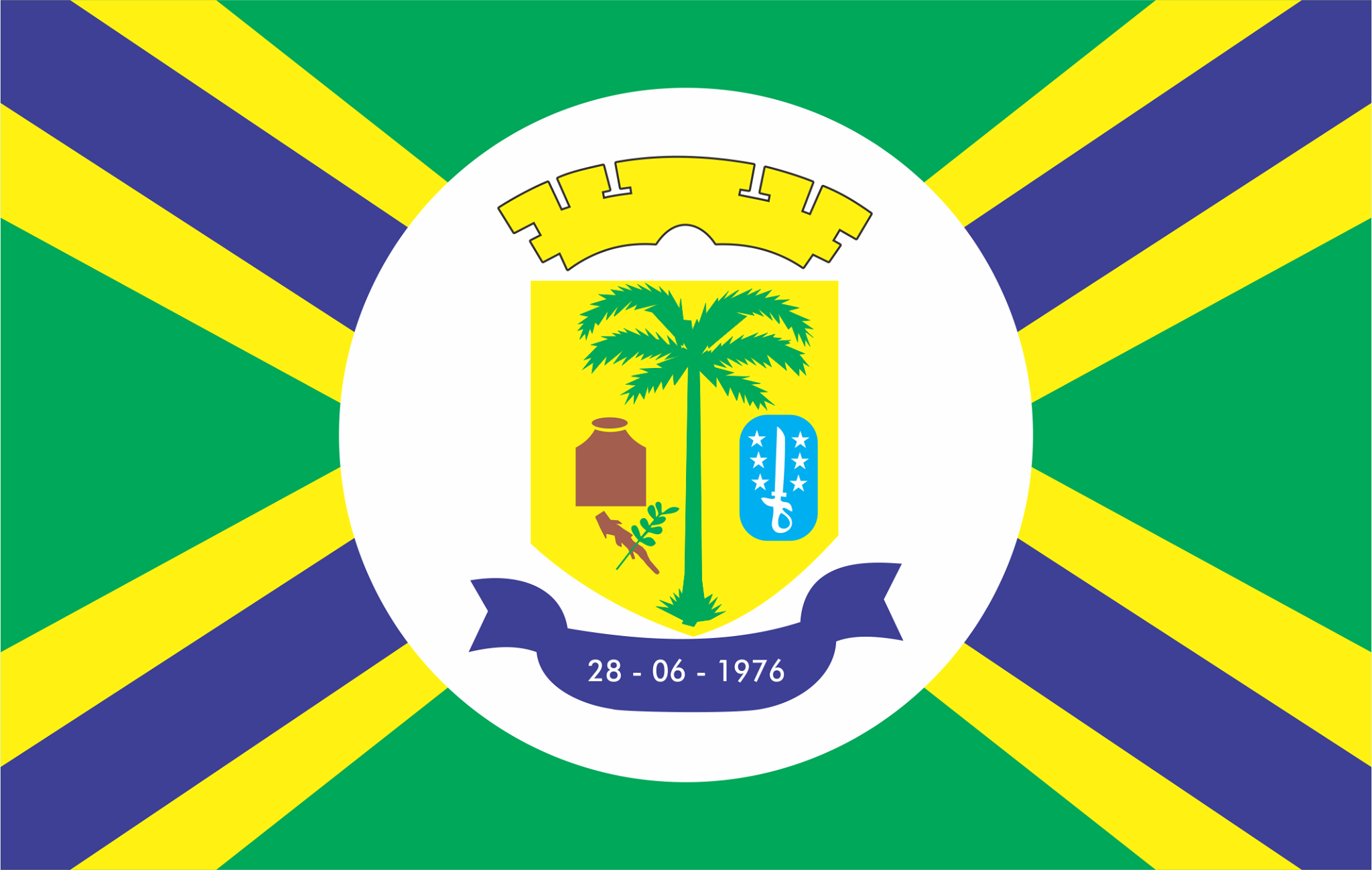
- Flag Coat of arms
- Interactive map of Presidente Dutra
- Country: Brazil
- Region: Nordeste
- State: Maranhão
- Mesoregion: Centro Maranhense

Population (2020)
  - Total: 48,036
- Time zone: UTC−3 (BRT)

Presidente Dutra is a municipality in the state of Maranhão in the Northeast region of Brazil.

The town is named after the 16th President of Brazil, Eurico Gaspar Dutra.

== See also ==
- List of municipalities in Maranhão
