= Buriticupu =

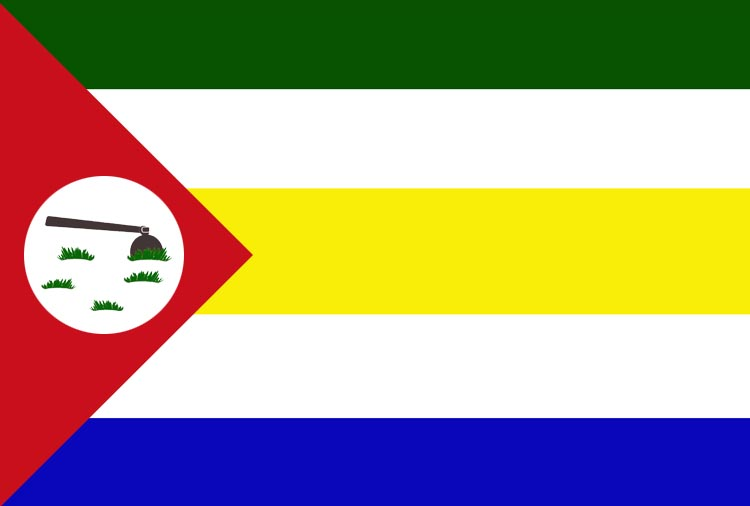
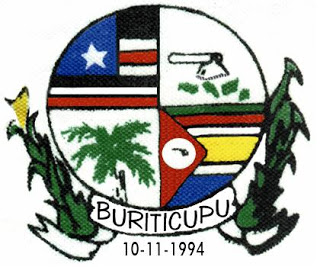
- Flag Coat of arms

- Location of Buriticupu in the state of Maranhão and Brazil
- Coordinates: 4°20′34″S 46°24′06″W
- Country: Brazil
- State: Maranhão
- Founded: 1994

Government
  - Mayor: Zé Gomes (PRB)

Area
  - Total: 2,544.975 km^{2} (982.620 sq mi)
- Elevation: 174 m (571 ft)

Population (2020)
  - Total: 72,983
  - Density: 28.677/km^{2} (74.274/sq mi)
- Time zone: UTC−3 (BRT)
- Postal code: 65393
- Area code: (+55) 98
- Website: buriticupu.ma.gov.br

Buriticupu is a municipality in Maranhão founded in 1994. Its population in 2020 was 72,983.

The area has suffered significant gully erosion with about 30 gullies (in April 2024), one of which is 80m deep. These are called “voçoroca” or “torn land” in the indigenous Tupi-Guarani language. At least 50 houses have been destroyed by the erosion and other residents have abandoned their homes, leaving whole neighbourhoods deserted.

The area, part of the Amazon rainforest, was once covered in trees, such as cedar, West Indian locust and ipê. In the 1990s the area had over 50 sawmills working 24 hours a day which depleted the vegetation which increased run-off, resulting in rapid soil erosion. The area has a volume of rainfall over 2,000 liters per square metre each year.
