= TV Vale do Xingu =

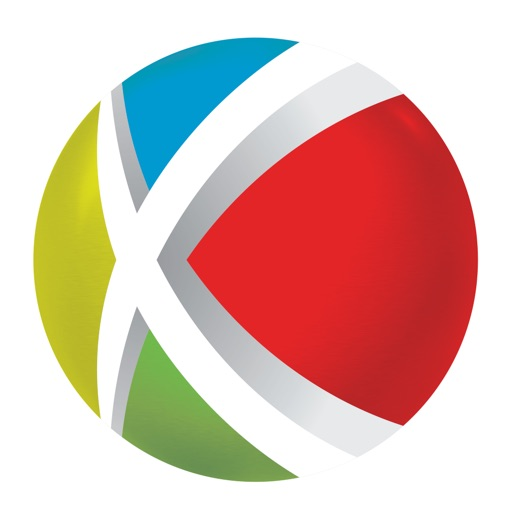

Altamira, Pará; Brazil
- Channels: Digital: 38 (UHF); Virtual: 10

Programming
- Affiliations: Sistema Brasileiro de Televisão

Ownership
- Owner: Grupo Vale do Xingu; (Rede de Rádio e Televisão Vale do Xingu Ltda.)
- Sister stations: Vale do Xingu FM

History
- First air date: June 6, 1989
- Former channel numbers: Analog: 10 (VHF, 1989–2021)

Technical information
- Licensing authority: ANATEL
- ERP: 0.38 kW
- Transmitter coordinates: 3°11′50.8″S 52°11′12.4″W

Links
- Public license information: Profile
- Website: www.valedoxingu.com.br

TV Vale do Xingu (channel 10), is an SBT-affiliated television station licensed to Altamira, Pará. The station is owned by Grupo Vale do Xingu, which also includes Vale do Xingu FM radio and the Confirma Notícia portal. Its studios are located in the Center of Altamira, and its transmitters are in the Alberto Soares neighborhood, close to the 51st Jungle Infantry Battalion of the Brazilian Army.

== History ==
It was inaugurated on June 6, 1989, as an SBT affiliate, by politician and businessman Domingos Juvenil, alongside radio station Vale do Xingu FM. The second oldest television station in Altamira, it was the first to set up a local journalism team and broadcast a live news program with news from the region. As of 2011, its director was Miguel Ceci.

In September 2017, presenter Lu Brasil was found dead at his home, in the Brasília neighborhood, in Altamira. The main suspect was his ex-partner, who is in prison.

Two of its news staff were verbally offended by Eleandro Pereira on June 1, 2022. On June 6, 2022, TV Vale do Xingu unveiled its new news studios. The project, with the new editorial team, brought together is sister outlets, news portal Confirma Notícia and radio station Vale do Xingu FM.
