= TV Aratu =

TV Aratu (ZYA 296)
- Salvador, Bahia; Brazil
- Channels: Digital: 25 (UHF); Virtual: 4.1

Programming
- Affiliations: SBT

Ownership
- Owner: Grupo Aratu; (TV Aratu S/A)
- Sister stations: Rádio Cultura

History
- First air date: March 15, 1969
- Former names: CNT Aratu (1996-1997)
- Former channel numbers: Analog: 4 (VHF, 1969–2017)
- Former affiliations: Independent (1969); Rede Globo (1969–1987); Rede Manchete (1987–1995); CNT (1995–1997)

Technical information
- Licensing authority: ANATEL
- ERP: 5 kW
- HAAT: 160 m (525 ft)
- Transmitter coordinates: 12°59′49.7″S 38°30′2.5″W

Links
- Public license information: Profile
- Website: tvaratu.com.br

TV Aratu is a Brazilian television station based in Salvador, the capital of the state of Bahia. It operates on channel 4.1 (25 UHF digital) and is affiliated with SBT. It is owned by Grupo Aratu, a media conglomerate owned by businessman Silvio Roberto Coelho, and which also includes Rádio Cultura de Guanambi, the Aratu On website, the outdoor media companies Ei! e Brasília and Chaves Outdoor. It is the second oldest television station in Bahia, after the then TV Itapoan, and the third most watched in Salvador and the metropolitan region.

== History ==
=== Rede Globo (1969-1987) ===
The station was opened without a name on March 15, 1969, by a group of shareholders involving São Paulo native Alberto Maluf and Bahians Carlos Alberto Jesuíno dos Santos, Luís Viana Neto, Humberto Castro and Nilton Nunes Tavares, as the second television station in the state of Bahia, which until then only had TV Itapoan, founded in 1960 by Diários Associados. The station opened on the grounds of a Candomblé terreiro. For that purpose, it was necessary to carry out a Candomblé obligation to ask permission and license from the orixás, fathers and mothers of the Bahian people, to build the new station. After several names were considered, it was only in July, four months after it was founded, that the station changed its name to TV Aratu, which refers to the crustacean that inhabits the mangroves of Recôncavo Baiano. Since its foundation, the station's logo has been a rooster, a bird used as a symbol of capoeira, which is why it is known as "the chicken's channel" (“emissora do galinho”).

In its first few months on air, the station had independent local programming, within months of its launch, the station signed an agreement with Rede Globo to carry its programming, causing its ratings to surpass those of TV Itapoan. From the outset, its signal in Salvador was broadcast on channel 4. During its period as a Globo affiliate, TV Aratu gained “postgraduate” status for reporters who were starting their careers in southeastern cities.

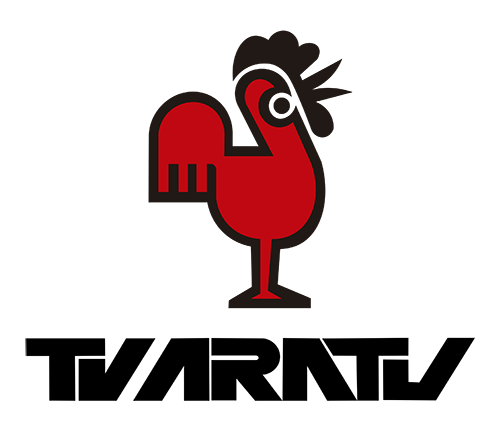
Logo used from 1976 to 1996

In 1973, it became the first Bahian television station to broadcast in color, giving it a new slogan, A liderança colorida (Leadership in color).

=== NEC affair and withdrawal of Globo affiliation ===
In 1986, Antônio Carlos Magalhães was the governor of Bahia, and during the NEC affair, Globo announced that it would withdraw from TV Aratu. Globo selected TV Bahia as its new affiliate in the state. For a brief period in January 1987, both Aratu and Bahia were rebroadcasting Globo until January 26, when by order of DENTEL, TV Aratu had ceased broadcasting Globo, joining Rede Manchete. TV Aratu returned to rebroadcasting Globo programs, but TV Bahia did not immediately comply, resulting in both channels broadcasting the same programming until April 4, when TV Bahia resumed broadcasting Manchete programming. The court battle lasted for another three months until judge Nicolau Mary Júnior granted the injunction in favor of Globo on July 6; at that time, TV Bahia definitively resumed the affiliation with the network, becoming the state's highest rated TV station.

=== Rede Manchete (1987-1995) ===
The loss of Globo's programming and audience leadership dealt a severe blow to TV Aratu's commercial revenue, causing its revenues to fall by 80%. Without sufficient funds, the broadcaster also ran out of money to update its already outdated equipment, and this was also reflected in the quality of the signal delivered to viewers, which dropped precipitously.

Under its affiliation with Manchete, one of the network's most glamorous events took place: the launch of Pantanal, its most successful production to date, held at Solar do Unhão, on Avenida Contorno. Furthermore, Manchete benefitted from TV Aratu who became the first network to carry out live broadcasts of the Salvador Carnaval.

=== CNT (1995-1997) ===
In June 1995, after eight years as an affiliate of Rede Manchete, TV Aratu left the São Paulo network and became an affiliate of CNT, on the occasion of its two-year lease to Organizações Martinez, at the time, under the command of the owner from Banco Bamerindus, José Eduardo de Andrade Vieira . The quality of the station's local programming and its signal improves considerably. With the new affiliation, TV Aratu changes its trade name to CNT Aratu.

In June 1997, when the lease agreement for Organizações Martinez was about to end, the station's owners signed with SBT, since the network would have no affiliate in the state with the purchase of TV Itapoan by Rede Record, and its subsequent departure on June 16.

=== SBT (1997-present) ===
At midnight on June 16, 1997, the station left CNT and became affiliated to SBT, on the same day that TV Itapoan also changed its affiliation and became an O&O of Rede Record. CNT was then relayed on UHF channel 39 until 2009, when CNT Bahia was created. TV Aratu further expanded its local programming with news programs and popular programs, and started to fight for second place in ratings with TV Itapoan and even for leadership with TV Bahia.

On December 29, 2000, the broadcaster signed a contract with Embratel and activated its satellite signal to be used by retransmitters in the interior of the state, replacing the old microwave links that were deactivated in the mid-2000s. At the end of 2001, the station was already available in around 80% of the state of Bahia, reaching around 10 million viewers.

== Digital signal ==
Virtual channel	Digital channel	Screen resolution	Programming
4.1	25 UHF	1080i	TV Aratu/SBT's main programming
4.2	25 UHF	1080i	Nossa Rede na TV
4.3	25 UHF	1080i	Nossa Rede na TV
