= Record Bahia =

Television station in Salvador, Bahia, Brazil

Record Bahia (ZYA 295)
Salvador, Bahia; Brazil
- Channels: Digital: 21 (UHF); Virtual: 5

Programming
- Affiliations: Record (1997-present)

Ownership
- Owner: Grupo Record; (Televisão Itapoan Sociedade Anônima)
- Sister stations: Rádio Sociedade da Bahia

History
- First air date: November 19, 1960
- Former names: TV Itapoan (1960-2011); TV Record Bahia (2011-2016); RecordTV Itapoan (2016-2023)
- Former channel numbers: Analog; 5 (VHF, 1960-2017)
- Former affiliations: Rede Tupi (1960-1980); REI (1980-1981); SBT (1981-1997)

Technical information
- Licensing authority: ANATEL

Links
- Public license information: Profile
- Website: https://record.r7.com/record-emissoras/nordeste/record-bahia/

Record Bahia (channel 5) is a Brazilian broadcast television station in Salvador, Bahia. It was created on November 19, 1960. It belongs to Record and minority interests.

The station became the second Record O&O to achieve leadership in all-day average ratings in 2018, after Record Goiás a few years earlier.

== History ==
In 1956, as part of an expansion plan for the Associated Broadcasters Network, Assis Chateaubriand received 9 concessions to establish television stations in the main Brazilian capitals, and one of them was channel 5 VHF in Salvador. In the same year, Rádio Sociedade da Bahia promoted two experimental broadcasts of the new means of communication, namely a mass at the Basilica Nossa Senhora da Conceição da Praia and a musical show, on December 8 and 9, respectively.

== Record Bahia's Programs ==
- Balanço Geral BA (night news)
- Bahia no Ar (morning news)
- Cidade Alerta BA (late afternoon news)
