= Grupo Silvio Santos =

Brazilian conglomerate

Silvio Santos Participações S/A
- Trade name: Grupo Silvio Santos
- Company type: Private
- Industry: Conglomerate
- Founded: 1958; 68 years ago
- Founder: Silvio Santos
- Headquarters: São Paulo, Brazil
- Area served: Worldwide
- Key people: Renata Abravanel, (CEO)
- Products: Television, Real Estate, Cosmetics, Record label, Lottery, Hotels
- Revenue: ▲US$ 5.2 Billion (2010)
- Net income: ▲US$ 103.0 Million (2010)
- Owner: Abravanel family
- Number of employees: 20,100
- Subsidiaries: SBT; Jequiti; Sisan; Hotel Jequitimar; Liderança Capitalização; TQJ
- Website: gruposilviosantos.com.br

Grupo Silvio Santos (Silvio Santos Group in English) is a Brazilian holding founded by the Brazilian billionaire media-man Silvio Santos.

The principal member of the holding is SBT, the second biggest network television in Brazil. The group also controls the Tele Sena, the Teatro Imprensa, Jequiti, Sisan Empreendimentos and many other investments such as hotels and shopping malls.

The group may also be recognized by its initials, GSS. In 2008, it was considered the 63rd largest company in Brazil.

The branch of communication represented by SBT and TV Alphaville is the third largest media conglomerate in the country behind only the Grupo Globo owner of TV Globo and Grupo Abril.

== Holdings ==
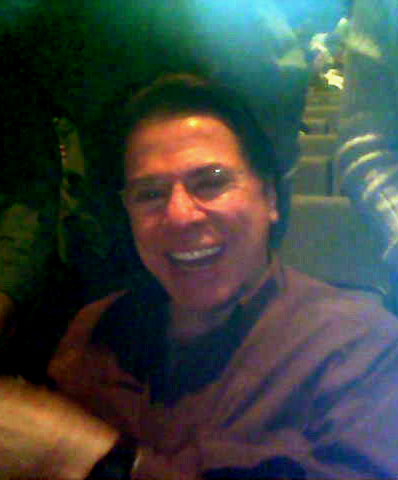
Senor Abravanel more known as Silvio Santos, one Brazilian businessman and the founder of the group.

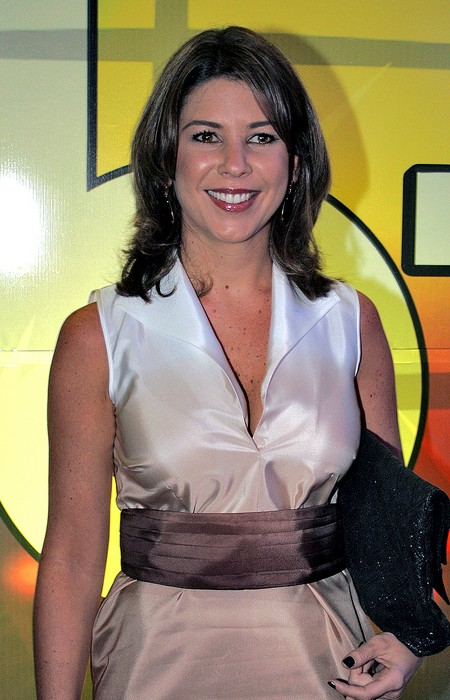
Daniela Beyruti president of SBT and daughter of Senor Abravanel.

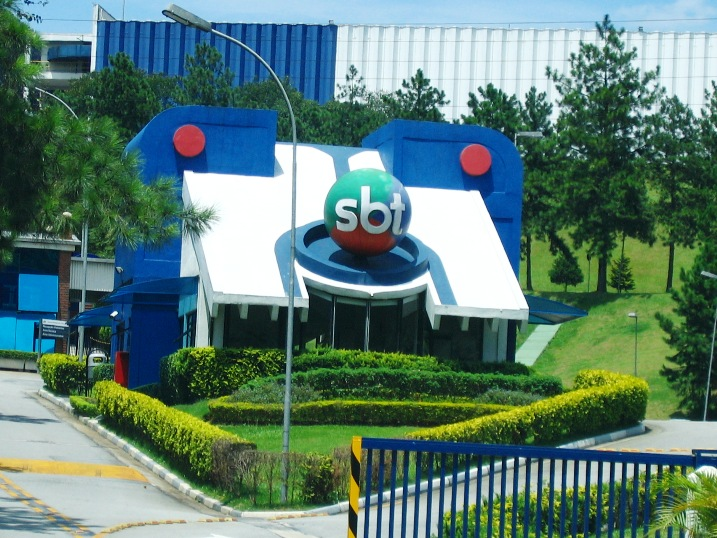
Input of CDT da Anhanguera of the SBT, the second largest television complex in Brazil, behind Estúdios Globo

- SBT — Network TV, the 2nd largest network TV of Brazil.
  - SBT HD
  - SBT Jaú
  - SBT Rio de Janeiro
  - SBT São José dos Campos
  - SBT Nova Friburgo
  - SBT São Paulo
  - SBT Belém
  - SBT Porto Alegre
  - SBT Ribeirão Preto
  - SBT Brasília
  - 101 SBT affiliates
  - SBT News
  - SBT Kids
  - SBT International Corporation
  - SBT Music
  - SBT Filmes
  - CDT da Anhanguera
- Auto Moto Shopping Vimave
- Silvio Santos Participações
- Liderança Capitalização
- Perícia Administradora e Corretora de Seguros
- Promolíder Promotora de vendas
- SSF Fomento Comercial
- Sisan Empreendimentos Imobiliários
- TV Alphaville
  - Canal TV Alphaville
- Centro Cultural do Grupo Silvio Santos
- Baú em Casa
- GSS Centro de Serviços Compartilhados
- Hotel Jequitimar
- SS Comércio de Cosméticos e Produção de Higiene Pessoal
- Lojas do Baú Crediário
- Teleton Brasil
- Teatro Imprensa
- Baú da Felicidade
- Tele Sena

== Companies that belonged to the GSS ==
- TV Corcovado, CNT today.
- Rádio Record São Paulo, sold to Edir Macedo.
- Rede Record, sold to Edir Macedo. At the time of sale Rede Record was the 4th largest network TV in the country. After a heavy investment in 2008 it became the 3rd network television in audience until May 2024.
- Banco Panamericano sold to investment bank BTG Pactual
- Hydrogen, sold to Hypermarcas
- Lojas do Baú da Felicidade, was the group's retail company, but was sold to Magazine Luíza
- Braspag, sold to Cielo
