= SCC SBT =

SCC SBT (ZYB 764)
- Lages-Florianópolis, Santa Catarina; Brazil
- Channels: Digital: 46 (UHF); Virtual: 10

Programming
- Affiliations: SBT

Ownership
- Owner: Sistema Catarinense de Comunicação; (Televisão Lages Ltda.)

History
- Founded: July 10, 1981
- Former names: TV Planalto (1981-1997); SCC TV (1997-2000); RedeTV! Sul (2000-2008); SBT Santa Catarina (2008-2019)
- Former channel numbers: Analog: 10 (VHF, 1981-2018)
- Former affiliations: Independent (1981-1982); SBT (1982-2000); RedeTV! (2000-2008)

Technical information
- Licensing authority: ANATEL
- ERP: 2 kW
- Transmitter coordinates: 27°48′49.1″S 50°22′18.8″W

Links
- Public license information: Profile
- Website: scc10.com.br

SCC SBT (channel 4) is a television station licensed to Lages, but based in Florianópolis, Santa Catarina, Brazil, as an SBT affiliate, being owned by Sistema Catarinense de Comunicações. Its headquarters in Florianópolis is in the Agronômica neighborhood, and its transmitting antenna is at the top of Morro da Cruz. In Lages, its office operates in the SCC building in the city center, and its transmitting antenna is at the top of Morro do Pandolfo, on the banks of BR-116.

== History ==
=== TV Planalto / SCC TV (1981–2000) ===
The station was founded as TV Planalto at 5pm on July 10, 1981, by businessman Roberto Rogério do Amaral, owner of Rádio Clube of Lages, being the first television station in the Planalto Serrano region. At its beginning, all programming was generated locally, without affiliation with any television network. The schedule was made up of local programs and news, as well as canned series such as The Pink Panther, Tom and Jerry, The Woody Woodpecker Show and 50 western films acquired with Fox Films do Brasil. The station also maintained a partnership with TV Guaíba from Porto Alegre, Rio Grande do Sul, featuring two of the station's sports programs, Guaíba Ao Vivo, shown from Monday to Friday between 8pm-9pm, and Seleção de Goals, shown on Sundays at 8pm, with a summary of the sports round. This partnership stemmed due to the fact that the station's coverage region had many Dupla Grenal fans.

In 1982, the station started showing on Sundays, alongside SBT, Programa Silvio Santos, which started to occupy 9 hours of programming. It was the initial step towards negotiations with the network, of which it became an affiliate in the same year, ceasing to be an independent station. In 1983, TV Planalto began expanding the signal to the west of Santa Catarina, and in 1985, to the coast of Santa Catarina. That year, the stionreached the capital Florianópolis for the first time, through VHF channel 4.

In 1987, Roberto Amaral entered into a partnership with businessman Mário Petrelli, who that year opened TV O Estado from Florianópolis and TV O Estado from Chapecó, forming Sistema Catarinense de Comunicações beginning in 1989. Petrelli's stations began to use TV Planalto's relay network in the West and Coast, while TV Planalto's coverage began to be in Planalto Serrano and in the Midwest, Alto Vale, North and South regions of the state. The partnership was dissolved in 1997, when Petrelli's stations left SCC, so that Florianópolis and Chapecó would adopt different programming from Lages, forming the embryo of NDTV, Rede SC, created on December 1, 2000, and TV Planalto was renamed SCC TV. The relay stations, however, continued to be used by Petrelli's stations until 2000, when SCC TV entered into negotiations for an affiliation with RedeTV!.

=== RedeTV! Sul (2000–2008) ===
In the early hours of December 1, 2000, TV Planalto started broadcasting RedeTV! programming, and changed its name to RedeTV! Sul. The station was now able to expand its signal again to the entire state of Santa Catarina, and as part of the contract, it could also cover the states of Rio Grande do Sul and Paraná (the latter only had the affiliation of TV Sudoeste from Pato Branco).

The station opened a branch at Morro da Cruz in Florianópolis, where most of its programs were produced, and began broadcasting its programming in the capital through UHF channel 18, on a RedeTV!-owned relay station. At its peak, it covered part of Paraná, reaching the West and North of the state until the entrance of TV Viana from Assis Chateaubriand, which started to cover the region. In May 2007, RedeTV! Sul completed its coverage area in Santa Catarina by installing relayers in cities in the West and Far-West, regions where a large part of the relayers had been transferred to TV O Estado in 2000.

=== SBT Santa Catarina (2008–2019) ===
On November 29, 2007, the station's directors announced that they had once again signed a contract with SBT to retransmit its signal in Santa Catarina, since Rede SC broke away from the network and signed with Rede Record, later changing its name to RIC TV. As a result, at 1:53 am on February 1, 2008, the station left RedeTV!, after the end of Programa Amaury Jr., and became affiliated with SBT after almost 7 years, changing its name to SBT Santa Catarina.

The first SBT program shown by the new affiliate was Jornal do SBT Manhã. On the same opening day, SBT Santa Catarina began transmitting its signal in Florianópolis through a retransmitter located in the municipality of São José, on UHF channel 59. However, due to coverage problems caused by the topography of the mountains, some time later they implemented an auxiliary relay in Morro da Cruz, on UHF channel 45.

During the year, the station promoted many changes, reformulating its journalism with the creation of the news programs SC Repórter 1st edition and SC Repórter 2nd edition. It also expanded its branch in Florianópolis, where part of the station's programming began to be produced, and also reformed its branches in Joinville, Blumenau, Criciúma, Joaçaba and Chapecó. In 2009, the station's signal was expanded to 95% of the state of Santa Catarina.

On November 19, 2012, SBT Santa Catarina left the Florianópolis branch located in Morro da Cruz and opened its new headquarters in the Agronomica neighborhood On the same day, new sets for the broadcaster's programs also debuted, and all of its programming began to be generated from Florianópolis. In 2013, the station began implementing its digital signal, starting with its branches and then other relays.

=== SCC SBT (2019–presente) ===
In February 2019, SBT implemented a strategy to eliminate regional brands from its affiliates. As a result, the station adopted the name SCC SBT, resuming the usage of Grupo SCC's name, which had been used between 1997 and 2000.

In May 2023, it was announced by Arilton Oliveira, pastor of the Seventh-day Adventist Church, through his official profile on Twitter, that the Adventist Church had signed a contract with SCC SBT. The agreement provided for the broadcast of a program called Primeiro Deus, presented by Oliveira. The program will last one hour and will be shown from Monday to Friday, at 5 am. The debut was scheduled for June 2023. The value of the contract was not disclosed. On June 5, Primeiro Deus debuted in the station's schedule.

== Digital television ==
Channel	Video	Aspect	Programming
10.1	46 UHF	1080i	Main SCC SBT programming / SBT

The station started its digital broadcasts in March 2013, on UHF channel 46 in Lages. Florianópolis, on its behalf, received it on September 30, 2013, also on physical channel 46. At the same time, the station started producing programs in high definition. The analog signal at the main station in Lages switched off on December 31, 2023.

== Programming ==
=== News ===
The station's first news program was Telejornal Panorama, presented at noon by Mário Motta and Marisa Helena, lasting one hour. In addition to the news, the news program had the "Cadeira Alfred" section, sponsored by Lojas Alfred, which interviewed several personalities from Santa Catarina and Brazil, and was led by names such as Gilberto Motta and Adilson Oliveira. Telejornal Panorama also had a sports section presented by Quirino Ribeiro, who remained at the helm of the attraction for 20 years. With the RedeTV! affiliation, the station launched the news program RTV! Sul, and Programa Roberto Salum, presented from the Florianópolis branch.

With the return to SBT, the station launched the news program SC Repórter, with two editions presented in the afternoon and evening. On July 24, 2010, SBT Santa Catarina replaced the 1st edition of SC Repórter with SBT Meio-Dia, presented by Moacir César de Oliveira. In its debut, the news program was attended by journalists Hermano Henning and Karyn Bravo. On August 2, it was the turn of SC Repórter 2.ª edição to be replaced by SBT News. On February 10, 2011, the journalist Luiz Carlos Prates was hired by the broadcaster, starting to have a daily commentary column on SBT Meio-Dia on February 21. That same day, ojournalist Marcelo Martins became the presenter of SBT News.

In 2015, the station's news programs underwent changes. SBT Meio-Dia is now presented by Marcelo Martins and Ildiane Silva, while SBT News is under the command of Fernando Machado, and now features political commentary from Cláudio Prisco. On April 15, journalist Luiz Carlos Prates is fired from SBT Santa Catarina after making a controversial comment about people with depression, stating that the co-pilot of Germanwings Flight 9525, Andreas Lubitz, was an "existential coward", and that "people who suffer from depression are existential cowards".

On July 16, 2016, the broadcaster and SBT RS started showing the journalistic Negócios da Terra, produced since 2008 by Rede Massa from Paraná, for the entire south of the country.

On March 11, 2019, SBT Meio Dia was reformulated, becoming two hours long, in addition to having new anchors and commentators. Cibelly Favero started to present the factual topics with Fernando Machado, in addition to Maria Ester, who started to take care of the variety topics and interviews with guests. Hélio Costa, coming from RIC TV, started to present the show "SBT Comunidade", where he deals with community problems, joining political commentator Cláudio Prisco Paraíso, who remains on the news. Ildiane Silva, who shared the presentation of SBT Meio Dia with Fernando Machado, took his place on SBT News. On October 16, the presenter of SBT News, Ildiane Silva, was fired after 7 years at the station. Journalist Bruna Radtke took her place from November 11.

On February 16, 2021, the broadcaster reformulated its news programs, which debuted new graphic packages and vignettes and also changed its name after 11 years, becoming SCC Meio-Dia and SCC News. On April 17, the interview program Ponto & Contraponto premiered on Saturdays, presented by Cláudio Prisco Paraíso, which hosts a public figure from the state every week to discuss everyday issues in Santa Catarina.

Em 7 de março de 2022, Cibelly Favero tornou-se a nova titular do SCC News, substituindo Bruna Radtke, que deixou a emissora. On May 9, Primeiro Impacto SC, a local version of the news broadcast shown by SBT, premiered in the mornings, with the presentation of Clayton Ramos.

On January 13, 2023, journalist Cláudio Prisco Paraíso was fired by the station after publishing incorrect information about the treatment given by the Federal Police to protesters detained after the January 8 attacks in Brasília and making attacks on the minister of the Supreme Federal Court, Alexandre de Moraes, during the program SCC Meio-Dia. With Prisco's resignation, the program Ponto & Contraponto, which he presented on Saturdays, began to be led by political commentator Roberto Azevedo.

=== Entertainment ===
Initially, the station's daily programming consisted of the programs Tarde Feminina, which brought themes about the female universe, and Bric Brec, aimed at children. On Saturdays, Gente Nossa aired, an auditorium program presented by Maneca, a radio host at Rádio Clube de Lages, and on Sundays, his partner Tavinho presented Roda de Chimarrão, a traditionalist music program, which remained on the air for 18 years.

After the affiliation with RedeTV!, the broadcaster opened a large space of local programming for independent productions such as Oh! de Casa, Cia. Liberdade, Supertrans, Bate Papo na Cozinha, among others. Its local programming schedule became the largest in the state, offering more than 100 hours of regional content per week.

On February 23, 2015, the broadcaster premiered the program SBT e Você, presented by Andrea Buzato, at noon. On March 4, 2016, Andrea was fired from the station, and the program started to be presented by Marja Nunes. The program ended at the end of 2018.

On September 28, 2019, Receita de Família premiered, a talent show aired per season that was previously part of the program SBT e Você in 2018. The attraction is presented by chef Carlos Bertolazzi, who had already done other cooking programs on SBT, such as Cozinha sob Pressão and BBQ Brasil: Churrasco na Brasa.

After around three years without variety programs in the noon slot, the broadcaster debuted on April 19, 2021, the program A Tarde é Nossa, presented by Laércio Botega, Maria Ester and comedian Mônica Prim, who plays the character "Dona Maricotinha".
