= NDTV Criciúma =

NDTV Criciúma (ZYQ 660)
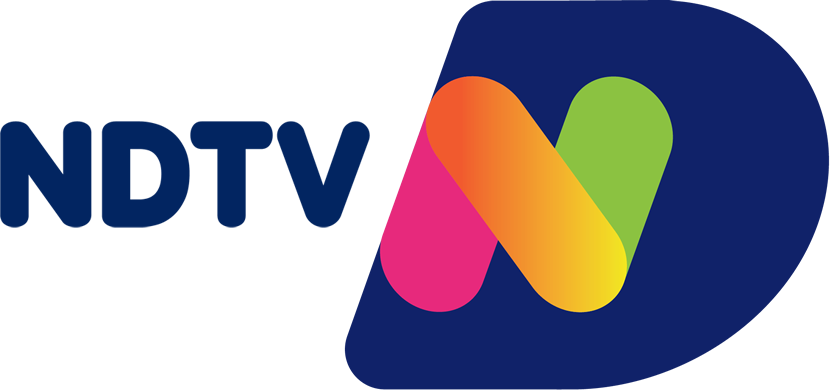
- Criciúma–Xanxerê, Santa Catarina; Brazil
- City: Xanxerê, Santa Catarina
- Channels: Digital: 28 (UHF); Virtual: 3

Programming
- Affiliations: Record

Ownership
- Owner: Grupo ND; (Televisão Xanxerê Ltda.)

History
- Founded: December 29, 1992
- Former call signs: ZYB 772 (1992–2021)
- Former names: TV Xanxerê (1992–1993); RCE TV Xanxerê (1993–1995); TV Record Xanxerê / Oeste Catarinense (1995–2008); RIC TV Xanxerê (2008–2019); NDTV Xanxerê (2019–2020)
- Former channel numbers: Analog: 3 (VHF, 1992–2021)
- Former affiliations: Rede OM Brasil (1992–1993); CNT (1993–1995)

Technical information
- Licensing authority: ANATEL
- Transmitter coordinates: 26°53′00.2″S 52°25′21″W

Links
- Public license information: Profile
- Website: ndmais.com.br/ndtv

NDTV Criciúma (channel 3) is a television station in Criciúma, but licensed to Xanxerê, Santa Catarina, Brazil, affiliated with Record, member of NDTV and owned by Grupo ND. NDTV Criciúma's studios are located on Hercílio Amante Avenue, in the Próspera district, and its transmitter is located on Morro Cechinel. In Xanxerê, city of license of the station, its structure is located on Dinarte Martins de Lara Street, in the Nossa Senhora de Fátima district.

== History ==
The station was opened as TV Xanxerê on December 29, 1992, belonging to the Rede de Comunicações Eldorado and affiliated with Rede OM. In the following year, it is renamed RCE TV Xanxerê, using the initials of the group, at the same time that Rede OM is replaced by Rede CNT.

On September 1, 1995, Rede de Comunicações Eldorado is dismembered, and the station is sold to Grupo Record, together with TV Cultura, from Florianópolis, and TV Vale do Itajaí, from Itajaí. They all start to relay the programming of Rede Record and the station passed to be identified as TV Record Oeste Catarinense.

On February 1, 2008, the station passed to integrate Grupo RIC, formed by Mário Petrelli in the state of Paraná, becoming component of RIC TV. As well as the branch from Itajaí and the old stations of Rede SC, Grupo RIC became the controller of these channels through a local management agreement. With the changing, it is renamed RIC TV Xanxerê.

On August 8, 2017, the station stopped producing local programs after the demission of majority of its professionals. The measure, according to the president of Grupo RIC, Marcello Petrelli, was taken due to the country's economic crisis. With the extinguinshing of the local productions, the station passed to relay the programming generated by RIC TV Chapecó, having only the insertion of local commercials and production of reports to the newscasts. At this point, RIC TV Xanxerê already had its signal restricted to its hometown, while its relayers already had been passed to the control to the station from Chapecó.

On December 3, 2019, with the dismemberment of Grupo RIC in Santa Catarina and with the creation of NDTV, it was renamed NDTV Xanxerê. At the same time, to equiparate the controlling interest of the other stations that belong to Grupo ND, Grupo Record sold 70% of the actions of NDTV Xanxerê, passing to be the minority shareholder of the station.

In 2020, NDTV elaborated a project to implant a branch of the network in Criciúma, southern Santa Catarina, something that its owners had wanted for years. The initial plan of Grupo ND and Grupo Record was the acquisition of TV Primavera, controlled by the International Grace of God Church, but the deal did not go ahead because the owners rejected the proposal. NDTV then went to a plan B, creating a new structure from zero and using the license of NDTV Xanxerê as the generator.

Starting October, there was invested 3 million-real in the buying equipments and hiring of professionals, as technicals, journalists and reporters, and in the rent of a commercial gallery in the Próspera, in the surroundings of the Cincinato Naspolini Park of the Nations, where the studios and offices were set up. All transference and implantation of the station in Criciúma took 60 days, record time to the standards of the communication. In the start of December, a gap-filler of the station from Chapecó was installed in Xanxerê, reforcing the signal of the UHF channel 30, at the same time that was reduced the power of the analog VHF channel 3 and the digital UHF channel 28, that by legal determination, need to be maintained on air to justificate the generation, even at 359 kilometers of distance from the headquarters.

NDTV Criciúma was launched officially in December 8, without a ceremony due to social distancing provocated by the COVID-19 pandemic, but counting with the presence of Grupo ND, Marcelo Corrêa Petrelli, and of the mayor of Criciúma, Clésio Salvaro, in addition to names of NDTV, like Cacau Menezes and Moacir Pereira, that also came to Criciúma to participate of the debut. The new local programming debuted at 11:50 AM with the program Balanço Geral Criciúma, presented by João Paulo Messer, followed by Ver Mais, electronic magazine presented by Gisele Tiscoski. With its entrance, NDTV Criciúma passed to cover other 45 cities of the southern Santa Catarina that before were covered by NDTV Florianópolis.

== Digital television ==
Channel	Video	Aspect	Programming
3.1	28 UHF	1080i	Main NDTV Criciúma programming / Record

The station started its digital transmissions in experimental character on July 20, 2016, over UHF channel 28. On July 25, it officially launched its digital signal and its local programming fully in high-definition.

=== Transition to digital signal ===
The station turned off its analog signal, over VHF channel 3, on October 15, 2021. The station's digital signal remains on its pre-transition UHF channel 28, using virtual channel 3.
