= NSC TV Chapecó =

NSC TV Chapecó (ZYQ 651)
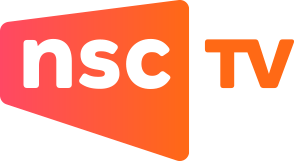
- Chapecó, Santa Catarina; Brazil
- Channels: Digital: 33 (UHF); Virtual: 12

Programming
- Affiliations: TV Globo

Ownership
- Owner: NSC Comunicação; (Televisão Chapecó S/A)

History
- Founded: April 23, 1982
- Former call signs: ZYB 767 (1982-2021)
- Former names: TV Cultura (1982-1983); RBS TV Chapecó (1983-2017)
- Former channel numbers: Analog: 12 (VHF, 1982-2018)
- Former affiliations: SBT (1982)

Technical information
- Licensing authority: ANATEL
- ERP: 0.835 kW
- Transmitter coordinates: 27°6′21.7″S 52°34′57.8″W

Links
- Public license information: Profile
- Website: redeglobo.globo.com/sc/nsctv

NSC TV Chapecó (channel 12) is a television station in Chapecó, Santa Catarina, Brazil, affiliated with TV Globo, member of NSC TV and owned by NSC Comunicação. NSC TV Chapecó's studios and transmitter are located on Jacomo Colpani Street, in São Lucas District.

== History ==
=== TV Cultura (1982–1983) ===
The first step towards founding the first television station in Chapecó was taken in 1976, when businessman Mário Petrelli won the public tender for the concession of channel 12 VHF. Petrelli invested around US$1 million in equipment and structure for the new station, which would initially be affiliated with Rede Tupi, just like TV Cultura in Florianópolis (sold two months after the inauguration of the station in Chapecó). However, Rede Tupi's concession was revoked in 1980, still during its implementation, and the businessman signed with the newly opened SBT. TV Cultura (not to be confused with the educational television network) was founded on April 23, 1982, and at the ceremony, one of those present was Nelson Sirotsky, who would be one of the buyers of the new station a few months after its foundation. Among the first TV employees were Jairo Lisowski and reporter Mônica Corrêa.

The RBS Group was booming in Santa Catarina, and in September of the same year it acquired Mário Petrelli's TV Cultura. With the purchase, the station becomes affiliated with Rede Globo and also integrates RBS TV, which in the state already had stations in Florianópolis, Joinville and Blumenau.

=== RBS TV Chapecó (1983–2017) ===
In April 1983, it was renamed RBS TV Chapecó, adopting the standardization of other stations on the network. Over the course of the decade, the station expands its signal to the entire west of Santa Catarina, through microwave relays that are still used today.

On March 7, 2016, Grupo RBS announces the sale of the station and other operations in Santa Catarina to entrepreneurs Lírio Parisotto (Videolar-Innova) and Carlos Sanchez (Grupo NC). Parisotto later leaves the company due to the scandal with Luíza Brunet, making the Grupo NC and its shareholders full owners of the new companies.

=== NSC TV Chapecó (2017–present) ===
On August 15, 2017, RBS TV in Santa Catarina completes the transition process to NSC Comunicação, and is renamed NSC TV. RBS TV Chapecó then changes its name to NSC TV Chapecó, as well as the other stations in the state.

== Digital television ==
Channel	Res.	Programming
12.1	1080i	Main NSC TV Chapecó programming / TV Globo

The station started its digital transmissions on December 24, 2013, on an experimental basis, through channel 33 UHF. At that time, programming from RBS TV Florianópolis was shown, without local insertions. The official launch ceremony of the digital signal took place on February 13, 2014, during Jornal do Almoço, shown especially in high definition, and was attended by the general director of Grupo RBS in Santa Catarina, Mário Neves, in addition to authorities as secretaries of the municipality of Chapecó and of the mayor of Concórdia, João Girardi. Its local programming only started to be definitively produced in high definition on February 7, 2022.

=== Transition to digital signal ===
The station turned off its analog signal, over VHF channel 12, on August 16, 2021. The station's digital signal remains on its pre-transition UHF channel 33, using virtual channel 12.

== Programming ==
Currently, the station produces Jornal do Almoço, presented entirely from Chapecó by Letícia Ferrari for its entire coverage area. The rest of the programming is made up of programs generated by NSC TV Florianópolis and Globo's national programs. The local coordination of journalism is by Gilmar Fochessato, who is also responsible for NSC TV Centro-Oeste.
