= NSC TV Criciúma =

NSC TV Criciúma (ZYB 762)
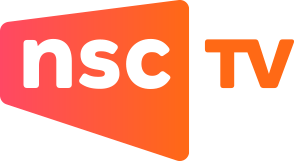
- Criciúma, Santa Catarina; Brazil
- Channels: Digital: 34 (UHF); Virtual: 9

Programming
- Affiliations: TV Globo

Ownership
- Owner: NSC Comunicação; (NSC TV Criciúma Ltda.)

History
- Founded: October 10, 1978
- Former names: TV Eldorado (1978-1995); RBS TV Criciúma (1995-2017)
- Former channel numbers: Analog: 9 (VHF, 1978-2021)
- Former affiliations: Rede Bandeirantes (1978-1992); OM (1992-1993); CNT (1993-1995)

Technical information
- Licensing authority: ANATEL
- ERP: 3 kW
- Transmitter coordinates: 27°6′21.7″S 52°34′57.8″W

Links
- Public license information: Profile
- Website: redeglobo.globo.com/sc/nsctv

NSC TV Criciúma (channel 9) is a television station in Criciúma, Santa Catarina, Brazil, affiliated with TV Globo, member of NSC TV and owned by NSC Comunicação. NSC TV Criciúma's studios and transmitter are located on Aristides Bolan Avenue, in Morro Cechinel.

== History ==
=== TV Eldorado (1978-1995) ===
TV Eldorado was notable for the modern architecture of its headquarters, which, seen from above, has the shape of a circle.

The initiative for the creation of a television station in Criciúma began in 1974. Rádio Eldorado radio host Antônio Luiz discussed with the Ministry of Communications the possibility of installing a new station in Santa Catarina, which already had, in addition to radio signals, other states, TV Colligadas and TV Cultura. It took several conversations and a series of preparations until 1978.

This year, on October 10, TV Eldorado aired its images for the first time, broadcasting Rede Bandeirantes programming. The official inauguration of the station, however, only happened in January 1979. In its beginning, the station had an extensive local programming, which occupied about 10 hours of the schedule. At that time, programs such as Show da Viola, presented by Antônio Rosa, and Revista Feminina, with Lenita Cauduro, were highlighted.

In 1981, the station's founder and owner, Diomício Freitas, died in a car accident. Manoel Dilor de Freitas, his son, takes over the command of Rede de Comunicações Eldorado, starting the expansion phase of the group and TV Eldorado. In 1982, the group acquired TV Cultura in Florianópolis, which began broadcasting in a chain with Criciúma on July 4, forming RCE TV. Until then, its signal arrived in the capital through a retransmitter on channel 4 VHF, which was later deactivated.

The programming then began to be retransmitted from the capital, such as the television news programs Meio-Dia and Jornal da RCE. However, Eldorado still produced most of the programs. The network would still gain two more stations, in Itajaí (TV Vale do Itajaí, in 1986) and Xanxerê (TV Xanxerê, in 1992), thus covering the entire state of Santa Catarina.

On March 30, 1992, TV Eldorado and the RCE TV stations left Rede Bandeirantes and became affiliates of Rede OM, after signing a 4-year contract. The broadcaster even accompanied the change of network to CNT in 1993, at a time when Manoel Dilor de Freitas was beginning to lose interest in the communications field.

=== RBS TV Criciúma (1995-2017) ===
In 1995, RCE announced the sale of its television stations and the outsourcing of programming for its radio stations. RCE TV officially disbands on September 1, with the sale of the stations in Florianópolis, Itajaí and Xanxerê to Central Record de Comunicação and the station in Criciúma to Grupo RBS.

After the sale, TV Eldorado is renamed RBS TV Criciúma, becoming the fifth Santa Catarina station on RBS TV, a television network affiliated with Rede Globo. The broadcaster's signal then began to serve areas in the south of the state that were covered by RBS TV Florianópolis. Currently, the broadcaster takes its signal to 45 municipalities.

On March 7, 2016, Grupo RBS announces the sale of the station and other operations in Santa Catarina to entrepreneurs Lírio Parisotto (Videolar-Innova) and Carlos Sanchez (Grupo NC). Parisotto later leaves the company due to the scandal with Luíza Brunet, making the Grupo NC and its shareholders full owners of the new companies.

=== NSC TV Criciúma (2017–present) ===
On August 15, 2017, RBS TV in Santa Catarina completes the transition process to NSC Comunicação, and is renamed NSC TV. RBS TV Criciúma then changes its name to NSC TV Criciúma, as well as the other stations in the state.

== Digital television ==
Channel	Res.	Programming
9.1	1080i	Main NSC TV Criciúma programming / TV Globo

The station started its experimental transmissions on November 21, 2013, through channel 34 UHF, being the first to operate with the digital signal in Criciúma. The official launch was on December 10, during Jornal do Almoço, shown especially in high definition live from Praça Nereu Ramos. At the station's headquarters in Morro Cechinel, an official ceremony was held with members of Grupo RBS and local authorities. Its local programming only started to be definitively produced in high definition on February 21, 2022.

=== Transition to digital signal ===
The station turned off its analog signal, over VHF channel 9, on September 19, 2021. The station's digital signal remains on its pre-transition UHF channel 34, using virtual channel 9.

== Programming ==
Currently, the station produces Jornal do Almoço, presented by Denise de Medeiros, who is also the station's local journalism coordinator. The rest of the programming is made up of programs generated by NSC TV Florianópolis and Globo's national programs.
