= NSC TV Blumenau =

NSC TV Blumenau (ZYB 760)
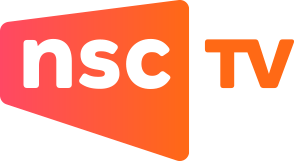
- Blumenau, Santa Catarina; Brazil
- Channels: Digital: 34 (UHF); Virtual: 3

Programming
- Affiliations: TV Globo

Ownership
- Owner: NSC Comunicação; (TV Coligadas de Santa Catarina S.A.)

History
- First air date: September 1, 1969
- Former names: TV Coligadas (1969-1983); RBS TV Blumenau (1983-2017)
- Former channel numbers: Analog: 3 (VHF, 1969-2018)

Technical information
- Licensing authority: ANATEL
- ERP: 4 kW
- Transmitter coordinates: 26°54′16.8″S 49°3′32.5″W

Links
- Public license information: Profile
- Website: redeglobo.globo.com/sc/nsctv

NSC TV Blumenau (channel 3) is a television station in Blumenau, Santa Catarina, Brazil, affiliated with TV Globo, member of NSC TV and owned by NSC Comunicação. NSC TV Blumenau's studios are located in the Center of the city and its transmitter is located in the Ponta Aguda district.

== History ==
=== TV Coligadas (1969–1983) ===
The state of Santa Catarina did not have local television stations in 1969. Even the first initiative to create a local station took place in December 1964, in Florianópolis, when Hilário Silvestre created TV Florianópolis. As it did not have a license to operate, DENTEL closed the station after 4 months on the air. Most of the state tuned in to signals coming from stations in other states through precarious microwave links. Blumenau, for example, received the signal from TV Iguaçu and TV Paraná, both from Curitiba, Paraná, through repeaters on channels 4 VHF and 6 VHF, from 1968 onwards.

The introduction of television in Santa Catarina, in fact, only happened on September 1, 1969, when a partnership formed by Wilson de Freitas Melro, Caetano de Figueiredo and Flavio Rosa, in addition to 307 other shareholders, founded TV Coligadas, operating through channel 3 VHF from Blumenau. The name Coligadas was a reference to the conglomerate that brought together, in addition to TV, the group's radio stations and Jornal de Santa Catarina, later founded in 1971. The station started at 6 pm, airing pre-recorded programs from Rede Tupi and Rede Globo, until 9 pm. In its initial phase, TV Coligadas hired several professionals from outside the state, coming from TV Gaúcha in Porto Alegre and TV Paraná, in addition to employees in Blumenau who, for the most part, did not have any knowledge about television.

Later, TV Colligadas installs a retransmitter in Florianópolis, through channel 12 VHF. The station continuously broadcasting Tupi programs until 1970, when TV Cultura was founded in the capital, which signed a contract with the Diários Associados network. TV Colligadas then started to retransmit only Globo's programming, creating a competition with TV Cultura. At this time, local programming was reduced. The main program was the local block of Jornal Nacional, presented between 1970 and 1974 by Carlos Braga Mueller, and directed by Nestor Carlos Fedrizzi. As with other affiliates, the duration of the block was minimal, reaching just over 5 minutes.

In 1975, the Emissoras Coligadas began to face financial problems, shortly after the creation of Jornal de Santa Catarina. The newspaper's journalism department, which was the same as that of TV, operated on Rua São Paulo, in another part of the city. As a result, the news arrived at the last minute at the station's studio, which created management difficulties. In addition, the costs with the communication group and other businesses were liquidated and ended up generating a decision by the broadcaster's management company. In 1976, businessman Mário Petrelli bought TV Coligadas and Santa, becoming the new owner of the group, in association with politicians Paulo Konder Bornhausen and Jorge Bornhausen.

In 1977, Rede Brasil Sul de Comunicações received the concession to generate channel 12 VHF in Florianópolis for the creation of TV Catarinense, which would form a bi-state network with TV Gaúcha in Porto Alegre, thus creating RBS TV. Globo then transfers its signal to the new station, and does not renew its contract with TV Coligadas, which was scheduled to expire in July 1979. As a form of retaliation (since Petrelli had participated in the channel's competition and had been passed over in favor of RBS, which was more enlightened to the Federal Government), the broadcaster in Blumenau decided to boycott the exhibition of the soap operas that Globo had premiered in the first half of 1979 (Memórias de Amor, Feijão Maravilha and Pai Herói), and decided to anticipate its departure from the network by three months, migrating to Rede Tupi on May 1, which made RBS anticipate the opening of TV Catarinense to the same day, still unable to produce local programming.

The following year, weakened by financial problems and the loss of Globo's programming, TV Coligadas is again put up for sale. In March, it is acquired by Rede Brasil Sul de Comunicações, and starts broadcasting in a chain with TV Catarinense, in addition to being re-affiliated with Globo on April 1, exactly 11 months after leaving the network. The amount offered by RBS to Mário Petrelli in the transaction ended up helping him complete the implementation of TV Cultura in Chapecó, inaugurated in 1982 — and ironically, also sold to RBS just a few months after it was inaugurated.

=== RBS TV Blumenau (1983–2017) ===
On October 1, 1983, following the standardization of RBS TV stations, TV Colligadas was renamed RBS TV Blumenau. During the decade, the broadcaster expanded its signal to the cities of Vale do Itajaí through microwave relays, which are still used today, with the exception of the signal coming from Florianópolis, which is via satellite.

On March 7, 2016, Grupo RBS announces the sale of the station and other operations in Santa Catarina to entrepreneurs Lírio Parisotto (Videolar-Innova) and Carlos Sanchez (Grupo NC). Parisotto later leaves the company due to the scandal with Luíza Brunet, making the Grupo NC and its shareholders full owners of the new companies.

=== NSC TV Blumenau (2017–present) ===
On August 15, 2017, RBS TV in Santa Catarina completes the transition process to NSC Comunicação, and is renamed NSC TV. RBS TV Blumenau then changes its name to NSC TV Blumenau, as well as the other stations in the state.

== Digital television ==
Subchannels of NSC TV Blumenau
Channel	Res.	Programming
3.1	1080i	Main NSC TV Blumenau programming / TV Globo

The broadcaster started its digital broadcasts on April 25, 2013, during the broadcast of RBS Notícias, whose opening event was attended by several municipal and state authorities and Grupo RBS. Special reports were shown on television news throughout the week, and on April 26, the Jornal do Almoço special was shown in high definition. Local programs began to be produced in the format on August 29, 2014, making the station the first to generate local programming in high definition.

=== Transition to digital signal ===
The station turned off its analog signal, over VHF channel 3, on November 28, 2018, as part of the federally mandated transition from analog to digital television. The station's digital signal remains on its pre-transition UHF channel 34, using virtual channel 3.

== Programming ==
Currently, the station produces the Jornal do Almoço, presented by Patrícia Silveira, in addition to the comments of Valther Ostermann. The rest of the programming is made up of programs generated by NSC TV Florianópolis and Globo's national programs. Specials are also produced and shown throughout the state, such as the Oktoberfest parade. The local coordination of journalism is Katiuscia Reis.

Since it became part of RBS TV, the station has produced local blocks of Jornal do Almoço and RBS Notícias, in an integrated manner with the network head in Florianópolis. For a few years, it also produced RBS Comunidade on weekends, which addressed issues and initiatives of local interest in the region, as well as its co-sisters throughout the state. On May 7, 2010, Jornal do Almoço began to be presented entirely from Blumenau, depending only on the weather forecast recorded in Florianópolis. On November 22 of the same year, the broadcaster inaugurated a new scenario in Globo's standard, which had some modifications with the debut of the new television news graphics in 2015.

That year, due to cost constraints, RBS TV Blumenau extinguished the local block of RBS Notícias in January. In March 2017, it also cut the final two blocks of Jornal do Almoço, which again had a part broadcast from Florianópolis, but in August, it resumed production of another local block.

In April 2018, Joelson dos Santos, who had presented Jornal do Almoço for about 8 years, left NSC TV Blumenau, being replaced by Adriana Krauss, who had already presented the telejournal between 2002 and 2004. Krauss was temporarily replaced by Vanessa Nora during her maternity leave, until in January 2019, Nora left the attraction, which was taken over by reporter Marina Dalcastagne. On August 12, the broadcaster resumed the full production of Jornal do Almoço, returning to the scheme before 2017.

On June 17, 2022, Adriana Krauss left NSC TV Blumenau, being replaced by reporter Patrícia Silveira in the presentation of Jornal do Almoço, and by Katiuscia Reis in the local journalism coordination.
