= NSC TV Joinville =

NSC TV Joinville (ZYB 765)
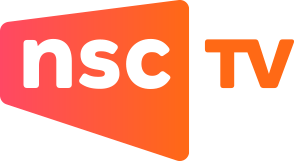
- Joinville, Santa Catarina; Brazil
- Channels: Digital: 33 (UHF); Virtual: 5

Programming
- Affiliations: TV Globo

Ownership
- Owner: NSC Comunicação; (Cia. Catarinense de Rádio e Televisão)

History
- Founded: May 14, 1979
- Former names: TV Santa Catarina (1979-1983); RBS TV Joinville (1983-2017)
- Former channel numbers: Analog: 5 (VHF, 1979-2018)

Technical information
- Licensing authority: ANATEL
- ERP: 2 kW
- Transmitter coordinates: 26°17′32.2″S 48°49′37.1″W

Links
- Public license information: Profile
- Website: redeglobo.globo.com/sc/nsctv

NSC TV Joinville (channel 5) is a television station in Joinville, Santa Catarina, Brazil, affiliated with TV Globo, member of NSC TV and owned by NSC Comunicação. NSC TV Joinville's studios are located on Pastor Guilherme Ráu Street, on Saguaçu district, and its transmitter are located at the top of Morro da Boa Vista, in the same region.

== History ==
=== TV Santa Catarina (1979–1983) ===
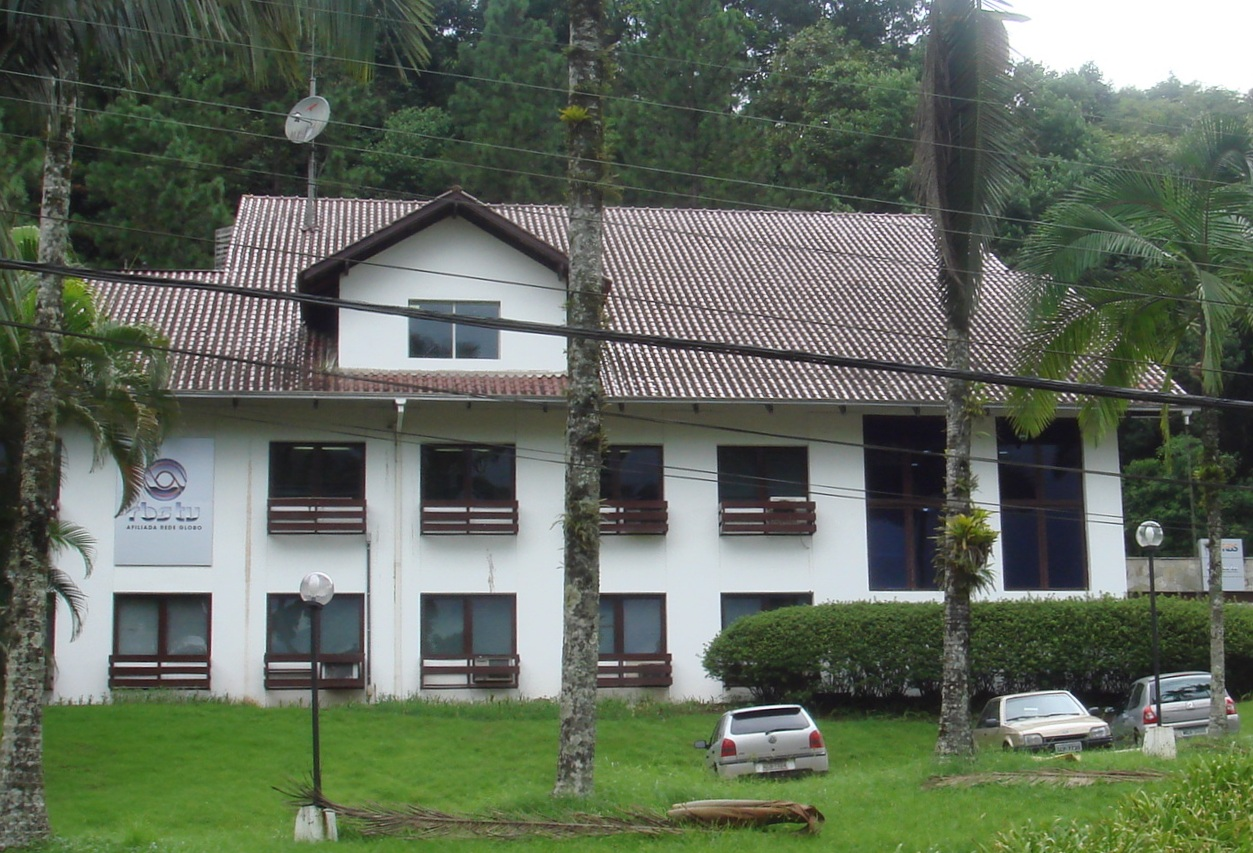
Headquarters of the TV station, in 2010

The first television signals arrived in Joinville in 1965, when a microwave relay for TV Paraná, from Curitiba, Paraná, was installed in the municipality. Like much of Santa Catarina, the city did not have signals from broadcasters from the state itself until the 1970s, since TV Cultura from Florianópolis and TV Colligadas from Blumenau were barely able to serve Greater Florianópolis and the Itajaí Valley with their own signals.

In 1974, the Companhia Catarinense de Rádio e Televisão (CCRTV), a corporation set up by 160 shareholders from Joinville and region, as businessmen, parliamentarians and local leaders, requested the concession of a television generator for the city from the Ministry of Communications. After competing against businessman Mário Petrelli, who ended up withdrawing from the event after formalizing an agreement (which, however, never got off the ground) to participate in the company with 40% of the investment capital, president Ernesto Geisel granted channel 5 VHF to CCRTV in a decree published on July 20, 1976. The society had a period of two years to put the station on the air, however, the shareholders had not obtained enough resources to make operations viable.

In 1979, Rede Brasil Sul de Comunicações expanded its operations to Santa Catarina with the creation of TV Catarinense, from Florianópolis, which went on the air on May 1 of that year, retransmitting Rede Globo programming. CCRTV then formalized an operational agreement with the station, allowing the retransmission of its programming to Joinville from May 14, 1979, when TV Santa Catarina was put on the air. Months later, RBS bought channel 5, in a transaction that was made official by the Ministry of Communications only in 1984, which was the initial step in its expansion into the interior of the state.

=== RBS TV Joinville (1983–2017) ===
On October 1, 1983, following the standardization of RBS TV stations, TV Santa Catarina was renamed RBS TV Joinville. During the 1980s, the station expanded its signal to the cities of Northern Santa Catarina, establishing its coverage in most of the region. Currently, 30 municipalities are covered by the station

On March 7, 2016, Grupo RBS announces the sale of the station and other operations in Santa Catarina to entrepreneurs Lírio Parisotto (Videolar-Innova) and Carlos Sanchez (Grupo NC). Parisotto later leaves the company due to the scandal with Luíza Brunet, making the Grupo NC and its shareholders full owners of the new companies.

=== NSC TV Joinville (2017–present) ===
On August 15, 2017, RBS TV in Santa Catarina completes the transition process to NSC Comunicação, and is renamed NSC TV. RBS TV Joinville then changes its name to NSC TV Joinville, as well as the other stations in the state.

== Digital television ==
Channel	Res.	Programming
5.1	1080i	Main NSC TV Joinville programming / TV Globo

The station started its digital transmissions on October 8, 2009, on an experimental basis, with the exhibition of the telenovela Viver a Vida. The official launch took place the following day, during Jornal do Almoço, shown especially in high definition. A ceremony was held at the headquarters of RBS TV Joinville, with the participation of various political and business authorities from the region and the state. On October 27, 2014, the station started showing its local programming in high definition. The station turned off its analog signal, over VHF channel 5, on December 17, 2018, as part of the federally mandated transition from analog to digital television. The station's digital signal remains on its pre-transition UHF channel 34, using virtual channel 5.

== Programming ==
On May 7, 2010, the station began to fully generate the Jornal do Almoço for its coverage area, with the exception of articles produced in Florianópolis of a state nature and the weather forecast. On March 22, 2017, the broadcaster started to produce only two regional blocks of the newscast, the last two being in a network with Florianópolis, rising to three blocks on August 23. On August 19, 2019, the newscast is fully generated for its coverage area.

Currently, the local edition of Jornal do Almoço is anchored by Rafael Custódio, with comments by Jefferson Saavedra and sports analysis by Elton Carvalho. The rest of the programming is made up of programs generated by NSC TV Florianópolis and the national programs of Rede Globo. The local coordination of journalism is Rafael Custódio himself.
