= Prates =

Prates is a Portuguese surname. Notable people with the name include:

- César Prates (born 1975), Brazilian football defender
- Cláudio Mendes Prates (born 1965), Brazilian football forward
- Jair Gonçalves Prates (born 1953), Brazilian football striker
- Jean Paul Prates (born 1968), Brazilian politician
- Luiz Carlos Prates (born 1943), Brazilian journalist, psychologist, and radio sport announcer
- Carlos Prates (born 1993), Brazilian professional mixed martial artist

== See also ==
- Prater (disambiguation)
