= NDTV Itajaí =

NDTV Itajaí (ZYB 768)
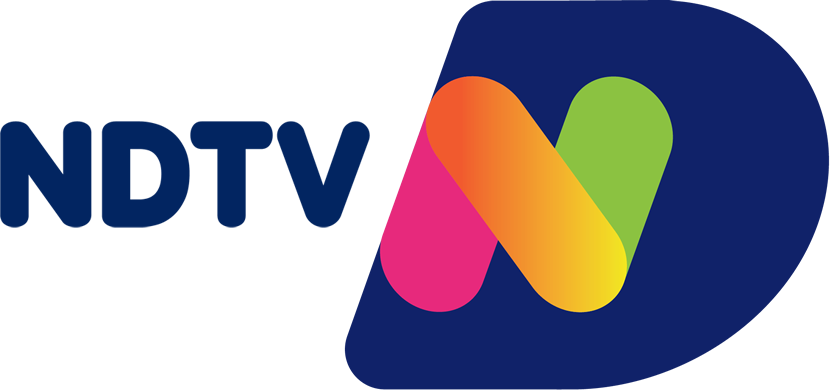
- Itajaí, Santa Catarina; Brazil
- Channels: Analog: 10 (VHF); Digital: 28 (UHF); Virtual: 10

Programming
- Affiliations: Record

Ownership
- Owner: Grupo ND; (TV Vale do Itajaí Ltda.)

History
- Founded: July 14, 1986
- Former names: TV Vale do Itajaí (1986-1993); RCE TV Vale do Itajaí (1993-1995); TV Record Vale do Itajaí / Norte Catarinense (1995-2008); RIC TV Itajaí (2008-2019)
- Former affiliations: Rede Bandeirantes (1986-1992); Rede OM (1992-1993); CNT (1993-1995)

Technical information
- Licensing authority: ANATEL
- Transmitter coordinates: 26°55′11.7″S 48°39′47.2″W

Links
- Public license information: Profile
- Website: ndmais.com.br/ndtv

NDTV Itajaí (channel 10) is a television station in Itajaí, Santa Catarina, Brazil, affiliated with Record, member of NDTV and owned by Grupo ND. NDTV Itajaí's studios and transmitter are located on Antônio Menezes de Vasconcellos Drummond Street, in the Fazenda district.

== History ==
The station was founded as TV Vale do Itajaí, on July 14, 1986, integrating the Rede de Comunicações Eldorado and relaying the programming of Rede Bandeirantes. On September 3 of the same year, its local programming is launched.

On March 30, 1992, TV Vale do Itajaí, as well as the other integrants of Rede de Comunicações Eldorado in Florianópolis and Criciúma and the newly released station in Xanxerê, began to relay the signal of Rede OM. In the following year, it is renamed RCE TV Vale do Itajaí, using the initials of the group, at the same time that Rede OM is replaced by Rede CNT.

On September 1, 1995, Rede de Comunicações Eldorado is dismembered, and the station is sold to Grupo Record, together with TV Cultura, from Florianópolis, and TV Xanxerê, from the homonym city. They all start to relay the programming of Rede Record and the station was renamed TV Record Itajaí.

On February 1, 2008, the station the station passed to integrate Grupo RIC, formed by Mário Petrelli in the state of Paraná, becoming component of RIC TV. As well as the branch from Xanxerê and the old stations of Rede SC, Grupo RIC became the controller of these channels through a local management agreement. With the changing, it is renamed RIC TV Itajaí.

On December 3, 2019, with the dismemberment of Grupo RIC in Santa Catarina and with the creation of NDTV, it was renamed NDTV Itajaí. At the same time, to equiparate the controlling interest of the other stations that belong to Grupo ND, Grupo Record sold 70% of the actions of NDTV Itajaí, passing to be the minority shareholder of the station.

On May 26, 2023, a search released by Instituto Mapa and Neokemp indicated that NDTV Itajaí became leader of audience in the Itajaí. The search heard 1,200 residents of 46 neighborhoods of the city and the station reached 32.8% of the preference of the people. With more than two hours of local programming, the programs Balanço Geral Itajaí and Ver Mais Itajaí are absolute leaders of audience.

== Digital television ==
Channel	Video	Aspect	Programming
10.1	28 UHF	1080i	Main NDTV Itajaí programming / Record

On April 24, 2015, the station started its digital transmission, over UHF channel 28.

=== Transition to digital signal ===
The station planned to shut down its analog signal, over VHF channel 10, on December 31, 2023, following ANATEL's official schedule, as part of the federally mandated transition from analog to digital television. However, the transition was later delayed indefinitely.
