= RIC TV Curitiba =

RIC TV Curitiba (ZYB 413)
- Curitiba, Paraná; Brazil
- Channels: Digital: 34 (UHF); Virtual: 7
- Branding: RIC TV

Programming
- Affiliations: Record

Ownership
- Owner: Grupo RIC; (TV Independência Ltda.)

History
- First air date: July 13, 1986
- Former names: TV Independência Curitiba (1986-2000); RIC Curitiba (2000-2007; 2019-2021)
- Former channel numbers: Analog: 7 (VHF, 1986–2018)
- Former affiliations: Rede Manchete (1986–1995)

Technical information
- Licensing authority: ANATEL
- ERP: 8.7 kW
- Transmitter coordinates: 25°23′39.3″S 49°17′2.9″W

Links
- Public license information: Profile
- Website: ricmais.com.br/curitiba

RIC TV Curitiba (channel 7) is a Brazilian television station based in Curitiba, Paraná serving as an affiliate of the Record for the metropolitan region. The station is the flagship broadcasting property of the locally-based Grupo RIC, which owns three other stations under the RIC TV name, serving the entirety of the state with its studios being located in the Pilarzinho neighborhood of Curitiba.

== History ==
The concession for VHF channel 7 in Curitiba was granted by President João Figueiredo on January 31, 1985, as part of two public competitions won by the Martinez Organizations (the other was for VHF channel 10 in Cascavel, which gave rise to TV Carimã, today RPC Cascavel). Since the group already owned TV Paraná, the concession was sold to businessman Mário Petrelli in February 1986, being one of the embryos of Sistema Sul de Comunicação, together with Rádio Independência (today Rádio Canção Nova Nossa Senhora da Luz), FM 104 (today Jovem Pan FM Curitiba) and TV Vanguarda by Cornélio Procópio, which had been purchased from Grupo Positivo in the year previous.

The SSC planned to establish the station in September 1986, transmitting Rede Manchete programming, which until then had been aired in the capital of Paraná since November 1983 by TV Curitiba. However, the planning was drastically changed when the management of channel 2 decided to bring forward its departure from the network, claiming that it would not broadcast its future telenovela, Novo Amor, under the hypothesis of having commercial losses to the change affiliation if it had good ratings, as was happening with Dona Beija.

TV Independência was then hurriedly put on air, on July 13, the same day that TV Curitiba ended its affiliation with the Rio network, using only a temporary 2 kW transmitter, installed on the top of Telepar's headquarters, the Palácio das Telecommunications, in the São Francisco neighborhood, since the work on its headquarters in Pilarzinho had not yet been completed. The building was located on land with a lower altitude than that of the hills where the towers of the other television channels in Curitiba were installed, damaging channel 7's tuning in a large part of the capital and neighboring municipalities, which caused the station to publish several advertisements in the newspapers advising viewers to call technicians to adjust the positions of their antennas.

On March 13, 1987, TV Independência began operating with a new 10 kW transmitter, eliminating coverage problems in Greater Curitiba, at the same time that it completed work on its facilities. On April 26, it began broadcasting on a network with TV Vanguarda de Cornélio Procópio and TV O Estado de Chapecó, Santa Catarina, in what is considered the initial milestone of the Southern Communication System, which gradually expanded throughout Paraná with new broadcasters until the early 1990s. Its local programming, however, only began to be produced in November, when the news program SSC Manchete premiered.

In February 1995, during its expansion phase across the country, Rede Record purchased a 30% stake in the television stations of the Southern Communication System, including TV Independência Curitiba, which meant the end of its affiliation with Rede Manchete from July 1, after 9 years of partnership. Until then, Record's signal had reached Curitiba and the region since 1992 through TV Exclusiva, with which TV Independência switched brands, and where Manchete continued to be active during its last four years of existence. In 2000, together with the other components of the now called Rede Independência de Comunicação, the broadcaster adopted the same acronym as the group, changing its name to RIC Curitiba.

== Technical information ==
Virtual channel	Digital channel	Aspect ratio	Content
7.1	34 UHF	1080i	Main RIC TV programming / Record
