= Record News Santa Catarina =

Television station in Florianópolis, Santa Catarina, Brazil

Record News Santa Catarina (ZYB 761)
- Florianópolis, Santa Catarina; Brazil
- Channels: Digital: 31 (UHF); Virtual: 6

Programming
- Affiliations: Record News

Ownership
- Owner: Grupo Record; (Televisão Cultura S/A)

History
- First air date: 31 May 1970
- Former names: TV Cultura (1970-1993); RCE TV Cultura (1993-1995); TV Record Florianópolis / Santa Catarina (1995–2008)
- Former channel numbers: Analog: 6 (VHF, 1970–2018)
- Former affiliations: Rede Tupi (1970–1980); TVS-Record (1980–1981); SBT (1981–1982); Rede Bandeirantes (1982–1992); Rede OM, CNT (1992–1995); Rede Record (1995–2008)

Technical information
- Licensing authority: ANATEL
- Transmitter coordinates: 27°35′20.7″S 48°32′1.5″W

Links
- Public license information: Profile
- Website: ndmais.com.br/record-news-sc

Record News Santa Catarina (channel 6) is a television station in Florianópolis, Santa Catarina, Brazil, affiliated with Record News. The station is owned by Grupo Record, but operated locally by Grupo ND, who also controls the local affiliate of the Record network, NDTV Florianópolis.

== History ==
TV Cultura de Florianópolis was founded and implemented at 8pm on 31 May 1970, on VHF channel 6. The first program seen was Informe Científico, a documentary provided by the US embassy. In its early weeks, it carried the 1970 FIFA World Cup, pooled by the several television stations, and relayed by satellite to Brazil for the first time. It received technical support from Rede Tupi, and in return it committed to showing the São Paulo broadcaster's programming. At that time, the difficulties were numerous. As there were no current transmissions on microwave signals, Tupi's programs arrived by road transport, with a two-week delay in relation to the live broadcast generated in São Paulo. In summers, the ribbons were damaged by the heat. The combination of these reasons led TV Cultura to expand its local program production. Until 1979, it was the only television station in Florianópolis.

With the shutdown of Rede Tupi in 1980, TV Cultura started showing local programming interspersed with programs generated by TV Record and TVS Rio de Janeiro. In 1981, SBT was created, and TV Cultura became one of its first affiliates. However, the following year, the station was sold to Rede de Comunicações Eldorado, and began to have integrated programming with TV Eldorado de Criciúma. RCE TV was then formed, which retransmitted Rede Bandeirantes programming, and which would expand with two more stations in Itajaí (TV Vale do Itajaí, opened in 1986) and Xanxerê (TV Xanxerê, opened in 1992).

On 30 March 1992, he began a partnership with Rede OM (later renamed CNT), which would last around three and a half years. On 1 September 1995, RCE TV was dissolved after the sale of the stations to Grupo RBS (Criciúma) and Central Record de Comunicação (Florianópolis, Itajaí and Xanxerê). TV Cultura is renamed TV Record Florianópolis, becoming Rede Record's own broadcaster, together with TV Record Itajaí and TV Record Oeste Catarinense.

At the end of 2007, the RIC Group announced the affiliation of Rede SC's with Rede Record as of 1 February 2008. TV Record Florianópolis then became Record News' own broadcaster, becoming Record News Santa Catarina, but operated through a local management contract by the RIC Group, together with RIC TV Florianópolis. The same started to happen with Record's former O&Os in Itajaí and Xanxerê, which continued to be affiliated with the network under the RIC TV banner. With the change of affiliation, Record News SC also took over the retransmitters belonging to RIC TV in the municipalities of Santa Catarina that already had the broadcaster's signal, in addition to expanding its signal to more locations.

== Digital television ==
Channel	Video	Aspect	Programming
6.1	31 UHF	1080i	Main Record News Santa Catarina programming/Record News

=== Transition to digital signal ===
The station turned off its analog signal, over VHF channel 6, on 28 February 2018, as part of the federally mandated transition from analog to digital television.
