= NSC TV Centro-Oeste =

NSC TV Centro-Oeste (ZYB 770)
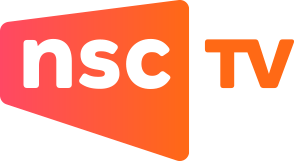
- Joaçaba, Santa Catarina; Brazil
- Channels: Digital: 34 (UHF); Virtual: 6

Programming
- Affiliations: TV Globo

Ownership
- Owner: NSC Comunicação; (Televisão Joaçaba Ltda.)

History
- Founded: May 27, 1988
- Former names: TV Catarinense (1988-2005); RBS TV Centro-Oeste (2005-2017)
- Former channel numbers: Analog: 6 (VHF, 1988-2021)
- Former affiliations: Rede Manchete (1988-1993); Rede Bandeirantes (1993-2005)

Technical information
- Licensing authority: ANATEL
- ERP: 1 kW
- Transmitter coordinates: 27°10′56.2″S 51°30′31.2″W

Links
- Website: redeglobo.globo.com/sc/nsctv

NSC TV Centro-Oeste (channel 6) is a television station in Joaçaba, Santa Catarina, Brazil, affiliated with TV Globo, member of NSC TV and owned by NSC Comunicação. NSC TV Centro-Oeste's studios are located in the Cruzeiro do Sul district and its transmitter is located in the Boa Vista district.

== History ==
=== TV Catarinense (1988-2005) ===
TV Catarinense was founded on May 27, 1988, by Saul Brandalise Júnior, Ivan Bonato and Maria Odete Brandalise Bonato, owners of Central Barriga Verde. The inauguration of the station was accompanied by several authorities, such as the governor of Santa Catarina, Pedro Ivo Campos, and the minister of justice Paulo Brossard.

In the beginning, like its sister TV Barriga Verde in Florianópolis, it was affiliated with Rede Manchete, and in addition to producing local programming, it also retransmitted programs generated in the capital. Its coverage covered a large part of the state of Santa Catarina, as well as regions in the south of Paraná and northeast of Rio Grande do Sul. In 1993, together with TV Barriga Verde, it leaves Rede Manchete and becomes affiliated with Rede Bandeirantes.

=== RBS TV Centro-Oeste (2005-2017) ===
In 2005, Central Barriga Verde put TV Catarinense up for sale. The station is then acquired by Grupo RBS, and on June 1, it is renamed RBS TV Centro-Oeste, being the last of the 18 stations created by RBS TV, and the sixth in Santa Catarina. The station becomes affiliated with Rede Globo, and starts to cover areas of the Midwest and the mountains of Santa Catarina that until then were served by RBS TV Florianópolis, RBS TV Blumenau and RBS TV Chapecó.

After acquiring the station, Grupo RBS began to concentrate programming generation in the municipality of Lages, investing more than R$1.5 million in the branch. The generator in Joaçaba then had only one reporting team, which ended up generating complaints from local viewers due to the group's preference for prioritizing the mountain region in relation to the Midwest. In December 2014, citing "administrative and commercial decisions", RBS TV Centro-Oeste returned most of its operations in Joaçaba, keeping some journalism, commercial and administrative teams in Lages.

On March 7, 2016, Grupo RBS announces the sale of the station and other operations in Santa Catarina to entrepreneurs Lírio Parisotto (Videolar-Innova) and Carlos Sanchez (Grupo NC). Parisotto later leaves the company due to the scandal with Luíza Brunet, making the Grupo NC and its shareholders full owners of the new companies.

=== NSC TV Centro-Oeste (2017-present) ===
On August 15, 2017, RBS TV in Santa Catarina completes the transition process to NSC Comunicação, and is renamed NSC TV. RBS TV Centro-Oeste then changes its name to NSC TV Centro-Oeste, as well as the other stations in the state.

== Digital television ==
Channel	Video	Aspect	Programming
6.1	34 UHF	1080i	Main NSC TV Centro-Oeste programming / TV Globo

The station, when RBS TV Centro-Oeste, was the last of the 18 stations of RBS TV to launch its digital signal, on May 26, 2014, through channel 34 UHF. The signal went on air during RBS Notícias, which broadcast the launch ceremony, which was attended by journalists and directors of the station, in addition to regional authorities. In Lages, the next day, a breakfast was held with the presence of authorities from the mountain region along with the station's team. On May 28, a special edition of Jornal do Almoço was shown in high definition. Until 2016, the year it stopped producing local programs, the station did not show its programming in high definition, with the exception of what was broadcast by RBS TV Florianópolis and Globo.

=== Transition to digital signal ===
The station turned off its analog signal, over VHF channel 6, on June 19, 2021. The station's digital signal remains on its pre-transition UHF channel 34, using virtual channel 6.

== Programming ==
In its phase as TV Catarinense, the station retransmitted the programs generated by TV Barriga Verde in Florianópolis, and produced local news. At this time, the Jornal da Manhã, presented by Clemir Schmidt, the Jornal do Meio-Dia presented by Edy Wilson Serpa and Marcos Valnei, and the Jornal da Catarinense, in the evening schedule, anchored by Nelson Paulo, stand out.

After the acquisition by Grupo RBS, the broadcaster began to produce local blocks of Jornal do Almoço and RBS Notícias, divided between the headquarters in Joaçaba and the branch in Lages. With the Grupo RBS crisis, the broadcaster extinguished the local block of RBS Notícias in January 2015. And on May 6, 2016, already under the management of Grupo NC, the broadcaster also extinguished the local block of Jornal do Almoço, ending the production of local programs and starting to retransmit all the programming coming from Florianópolis. Currently, the broadcaster only produces articles shown on the state network, made by reporter Eduarda Demeneck at the Lages branch. The region's journalism coordinator is Gilmar Fochessato, who is also responsible for NSC TV Chapecó.
