= NDTV Joinville =

NDTV Joinville (ZYP 269)
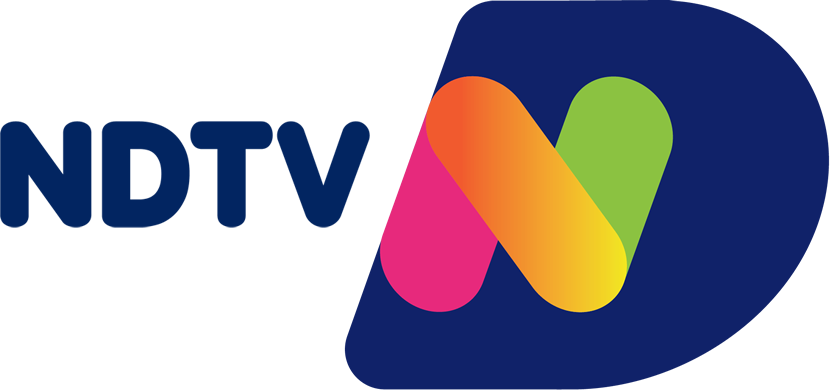
- Joinville, Santa Catarina; Brazil
- Channels: Digital: 30 (UHF); Virtual: 8

Programming
- Affiliations: Record

Ownership
- Owner: Grupo ND; (TV Cidade dos Príncipes S/C Ltda.)

History
- Founded: July 31, 2000
- Former call signs: ZYB 773 (2000-2018)
- Former names: TV Cidade dos Príncipes (2000); Rede SC Joinville (2000-2008); RIC TV Joinville (2008-2019)
- Former channel numbers: Analog: 8 (VHF, 2000-2018)
- Former affiliations: SBT (2000-2008)

Technical information
- Licensing authority: ANATEL
- Transmitter coordinates: 26°17′31.1″S 48°49′38.7″W

Links
- Public license information: Profile
- Website: ndmais.com.br/ndtv

NDTV Joinville (channel 8) is a television station in Joinville, Santa Catarina, Brazil, affiliated with Record, member of NDTV and owned by Grupo ND. NDTV Joinville's studios are located on Xavantes Street, in the Atiradores district and its transmitter is located in the atop of Morro da Boa Vista, in the Saguaçu district.

== History ==
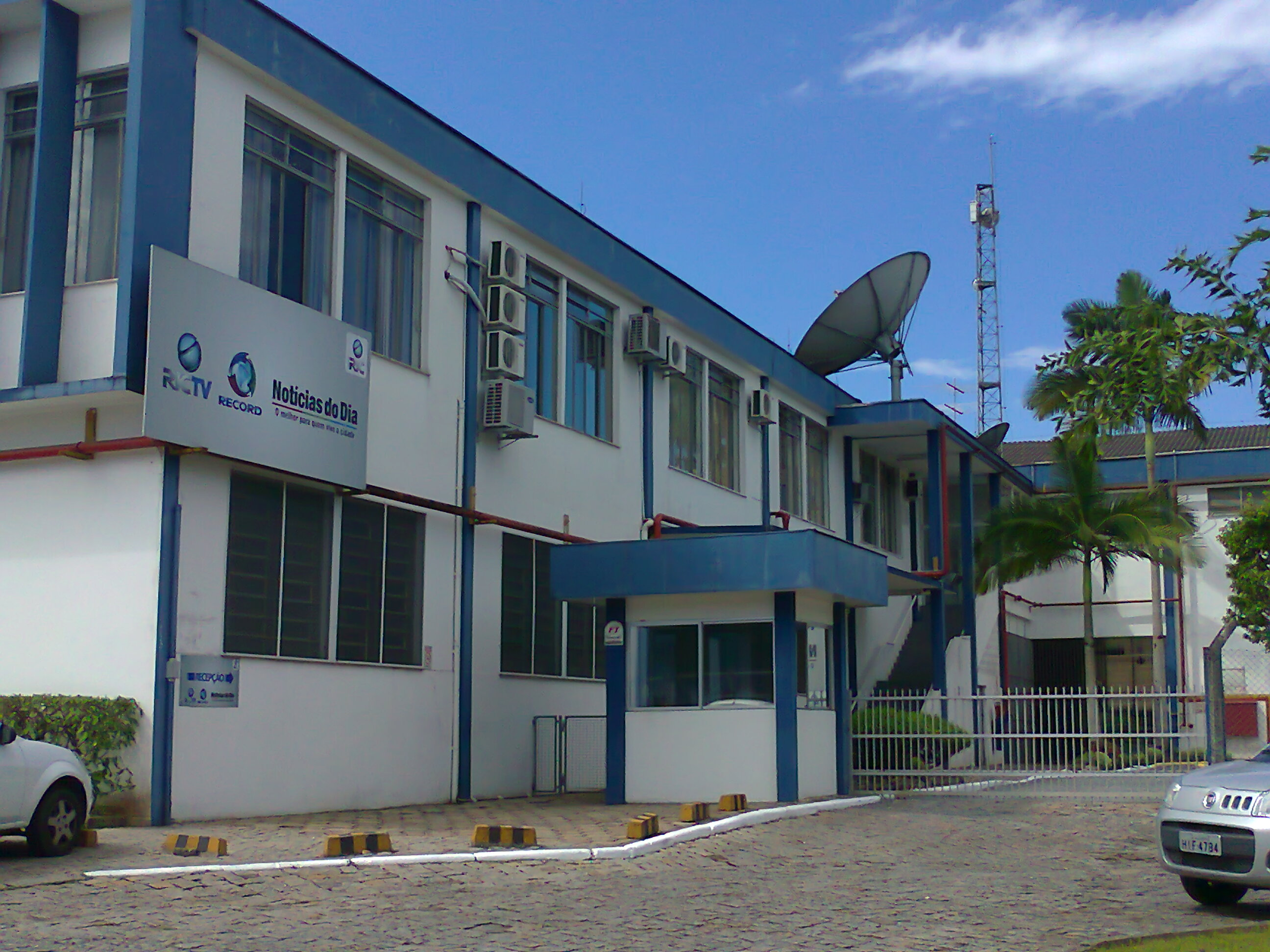
Headquarters of the station in 2012, when it was called RIC TV Joinville.

The station went on air on July 31, 2000, as TV Cidade dos Príncipes, behind the third Mário Petrelli's television network in Santa Catarina and the hundredth affiliated with SBT. On December 1 of the same year, it was renamed Rede SC Joinville, after unify its brand with the stations from Florianópolis and Chapecó, creating Rede SC.

On February 1, 2008, the station passed to integrate Grupo RIC, formed by Mário Petrelli in the state of Paraná, being component of RIC TV. Like the stations of Rede SC, it started to relay the programming of Rede Record and to be identified as RIC TV Joinville.

On December 3, 2019, with the dismemberment of Grupo RIC in Santa Catarina and with the creation of NDTV, it was renamed NDTV Joinville.

== Digital television ==
Channel	Video	Aspect	Programming
8.1	30 UHF	1080i	Main NDTV Joinville programming / Record

On November 11, 2013, the station started its digital transmissions over UHF channel 30.
