= NDTV Blumenau =

NDTV Blumenau (ZYQ 653)
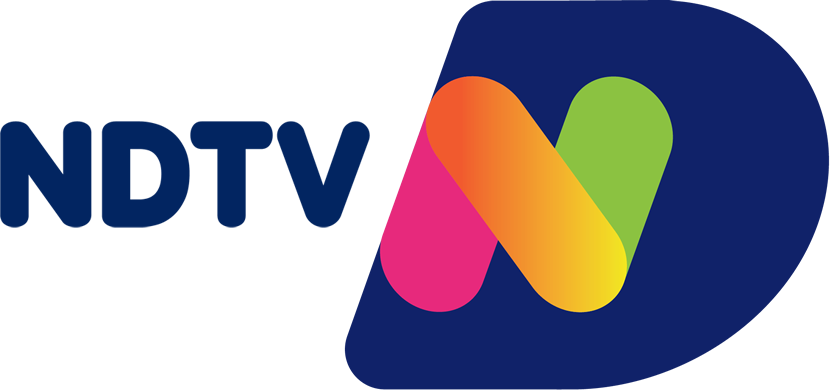
- Blumenau, Santa Catarina; Brazil
- Channels: Digital: 30 (UHF); Virtual: 9

Programming
- Affiliations: Record

Ownership
- Owner: Grupo ND; (TV Top Ltda.)

History
- Founded: December 11, 2004
- Former call signs: ZYB 782 (2004-2018)
- Former names: Rede SC Blumenau (2004-2008); RIC TV Blumenau (2008-2019)
- Former channel numbers: Analog: 9 (VHF, 2004-2018)
- Former affiliations: SBT (2004-2008)

Technical information
- Licensing authority: ANATEL
- Transmitter coordinates: 26°54′18.4″S 49°03′32.6″W

Links
- Public license information: Profile
- Website: ndmais.com.br/ndtv

NDTV Blumenau (channel 9) is a television station in Blumenau, Santa Catarina, Brazil, affiliated with Record, member of NDTV and owned by Grupo ND. NDTV Blumenau's studios are located on Rua das Missões, in the Ponta Aguda district and its transmitter is located in the Muenchen Street, in the same region.

== History ==
On June 27, 2002, the Ministry of the Communications granted to Grupo RIC the license of the channel 9 from Blumenau, through the decree signed by the president Fernando Henrique Cardoso. On November 10, 2004, the station started its transmissions in experimental character, and on December 11, 2004, Rede SC Blumenau, fourth station of Rede SC in Santa Catarina, was founded.

On October 31, 2007, Rede SC signs contract with Rede Record and enters in transitory phase, with the changing in the name of its programs and changes in the logo, that stops taking the brand of SBT. On February 1, 2008, together with the other stations of Rede SC, it was renamed RIC TV Blumenau, and passed to relay the programming of Rede Record, unifying the affiliation of the stations of Grupo RIC in Santa Catarina, in action since 1987 in Paraná.

On December 3, 2019, with the dismemberment of Grupo RIC in Santa Catarina and with the creation of NDTV, it was renamed NDTV Blumenau.

== Technical information and subchannels ==
| Channel | Res. | Programming |
|---|---|---|
| 9.1 | 1080i | Main NDTV Blumenau programming / Record |

=== Transition to digital signal ===
The station turned off its analog signal, over VHF channel 9, on December 17, 2018, as part of the federally mandated transition from analog to digital television. The station's digital signal remains on its pre-transition UHF channel 30, using virtual channel 9.
