= NSC TV =

Brazilian regional television network based in Santa Catarina

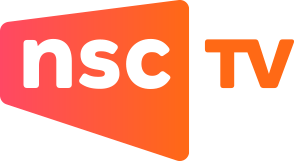
- Type: Terrestrial television network
- Country: Brazil
- Availability: Santa Catarina
- Founded: 1979 (as RBS TV Santa Catarina)
- TV stations: NSC TV (Florianópolis); NSC TV (Blumenau); NSC TV (Chapecó); NSC TV (Criciúma); NSC TV (Joaçaba); NSC TV (Joinville)
- Headquarters: Florianópolis, Santa Catarina
- Owner: NSC Comunicação
- Launch date: 1979
- Digital channels: 33 UHF (Florianópolis, Chapecó and Joinville); 34 UHF (Blumenau, Criciúma, Joaçaba and Lages)
- Picture format: 1080i (HDTV); 480i (SDTV)
- Affiliation: TV Globo
- Official website: redeglobo.globo.com/sc/nsctv
- Language: Portuguese

NSC TV is a Brazilian regional television network that operates in the state of Santa Catarina. The network, whose acronym stands for Nossa Santa Catarina (English: "Our Santa Catarina"), is an affiliate of Rede Globo.

NSC TV owns six affiliates in Santa Catarina, and the network's headquarters is in Florianópolis.

== History ==
Beginning in 1979, Grupo RBS was the owner of six Rede Globo-affiliated television stations in Santa Catarina; those affiliates were operated as part of the RBS TV network. However, in 2011, Grupo RBS began to experience financial problems when its employees began to be detained for crimes against the country's national financial system as part of Operation Zelotes. Over the next four years, the group terminated the contracts of dozens of employees and rumors began to build about a potential sale of RBS TV's affiliates.

On March 7, 2016, RBS announced that its affiliates that are based in Santa Catarina would be sold to a new ownership group headed by the owner of Grupo NC. The sale was approved by CADE on July 15.

In October 2016, Grupo NC began to drop all instances of the RBS TV name from its newly acquired television affiliates. On August 15, 2017, those affiliates formed a new regional network under the name NSC TV.

== Stations ==
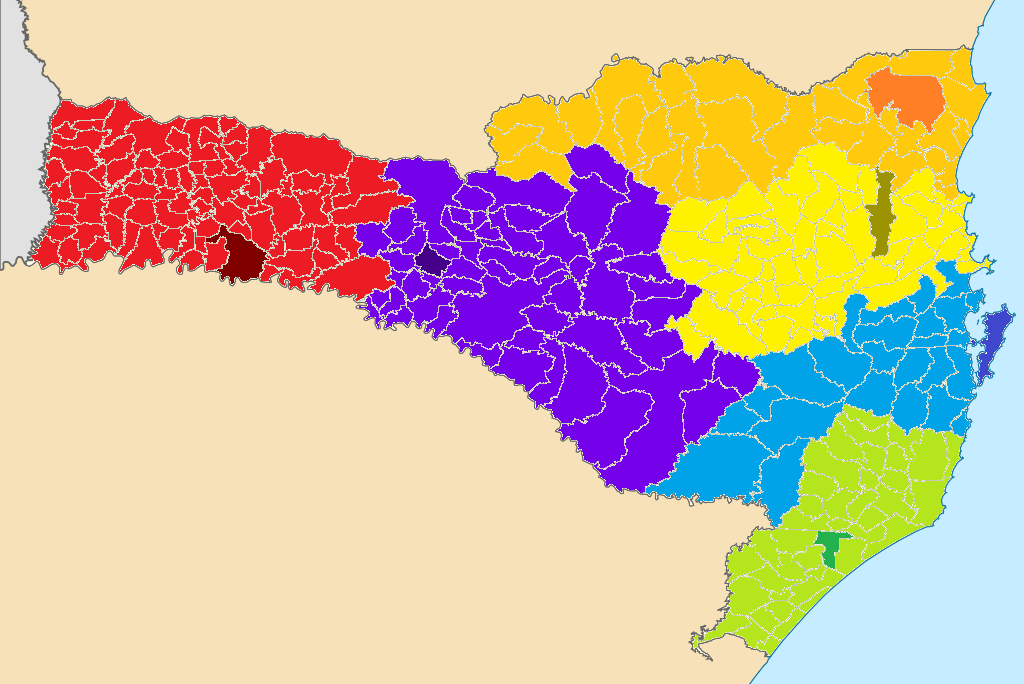
Division of NSC TV's coverage area by station.

Callsign	Broadcaster	Channel	Location
ZYB 763	NSC TV Florianópolis	12 (33 UHF) (digital)	Florianópolis
ZYB 760	NSC TV Blumenau	3 (34 UHF digital)	Blumenau
ZYB 770	NSC TV Centro-Oeste	6 VHF (analog); 34 UHF (digital)	Joaçaba
ZYQ 651	NSC TV Chapecó	12 VHF (analog); 33 UHF (digital)	Chapecó
ZYB 762	NSC TV Criciúma	9 VHF (analog); 34 UHF (digital)	Criciúma
ZYB 765	NSC TV Joinville	5 (33 UHF digital)	Joinville

== Local programs ==
- Bom Dia Santa Catarina (local version of Bom Dia Brasil)
- Jornal do Almoço
- Globo Esporte SC (local version of Globo Esporte)
- NSC Notícias
