= Oeste Catarinense =

Mesoregion in Santa Catarina, Brazil

Coordinates: 26°52′37″S 52°24′14″W

Mesoregion Oeste Catarinense

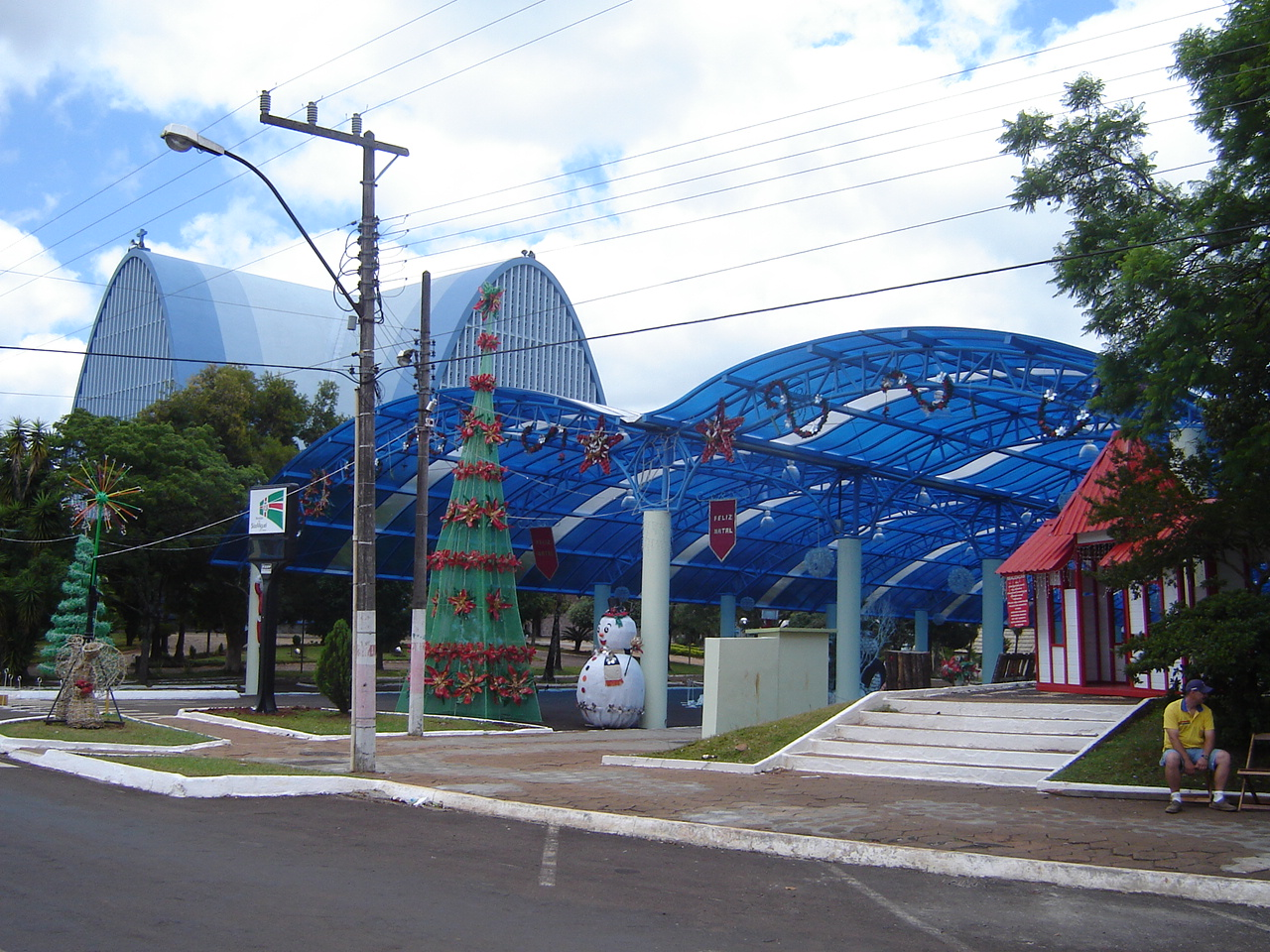
Church of São Miguel (St. Michael) in Oeste

Oeste Catarinense (West Region) is a mesoregion in the Brazilian state of Santa Catarina.

The macroregion is composed of four microregions: (1) Far west, whose main city is São Miguel do Oeste, on the border with the Argentine Republic; (2) Midwest - whose main city is Chapecó; (3) Alto Irani Region - whose main city is Xanxerê; (4) Rio do Peixe Valley Region - whose main city is Joaçaba

The region is called "granary of the State", because it has a large agroindustrial, agricultural and livestock production, slaughterhouses and food industry.

In geographic terms, the region is strategically located between the two largest metropolitan areas in South America (São Paulo in Brazil and Buenos Aires, in Argentina).

== Data about the region ==
In 2010, the population of the Macroregion reached 601,504 inhabitants, equivalent to 9.63% of the State's population, and between 2000 and 2010 it presented an average population growth rate of the order of 1.08% per year, with a density population of 53.0 inhabitants per km^{2}. The population distribution by gender identified that men represent about 49.97% of the population and women, 50.03% of the population.

In 2010, young people represented about 31.2% of the population, adults 58.0% and the elderly 10.8%. Between 2000 and 2010, there was a positive evolution of 6.3% in the percentage of the economically active population, going from 53.2% in 2000 to 59.6% in 2010.

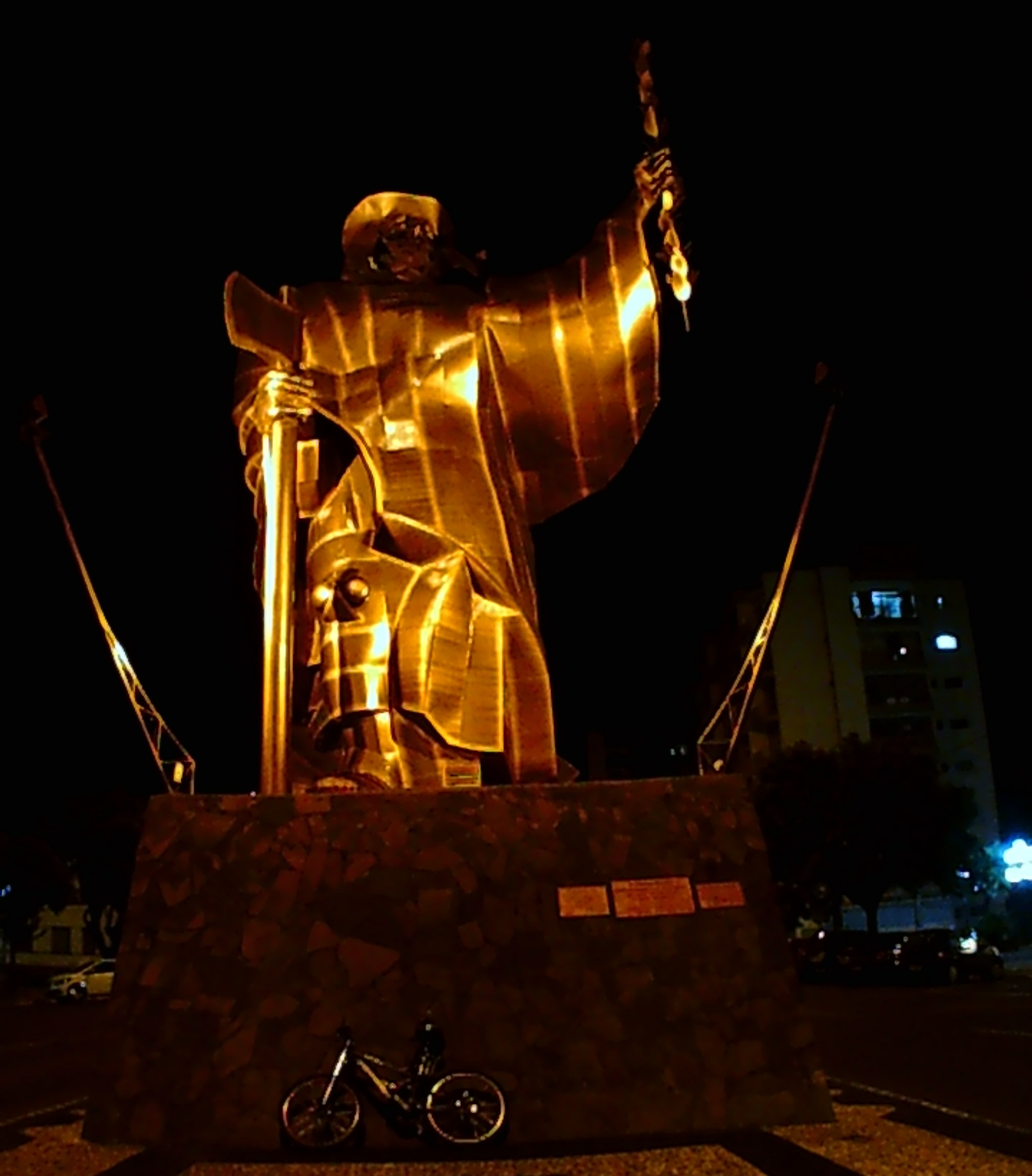
Monument called "The Pathfinder", by the artist Paulo de Siqueira, in the city of Chapecó, representing the first settlers who explored and built the region.

The region has approximately 189,020 households, of which: 73.4% were owned, 19.2% rented, 7.1% ceded and 0.3% in another condition. In 2010, the annual per capita consumption of R$11,300.72.

In 2009, the State, globally, had a GDP of R $129.8 billion, assuring the State the maintenance of the 8th relative position in the national ranking. In the same year, the region appeared in the 6th position of the state ranking, accounting for 9.94% of the composition of the total GDP of the state.

In 2009, the Macroregion presented a gross domestic product per capita of R$21,551.68 placing it in the 4th position in the state ranking. From 2002 to 2009, the region's GDP per capita grew by 48.09%.

In 2011, Macrorregião Oeste's trade balance showed a balance of US$321,398,078.0. In the period between 2004 and 2011, its exports grew by 176.3% and imports, by 181.3%.

The main destination country for 2011 exports was Japan. Exports to this country represented approximately 9.9%. Regarding imports, China was the main country of origin of Macroregion's 2011 imports, corresponding to 17% of total imports.

Taking December 2011 as a reference, there were 43,460 formal companies, which generated 187,787 formal jobs. In 2010, maize was the most important crop in terms of the quantity produced. It represented 25.62% of all state production. In the same year, soybeans represented the largest planted area, 166,118 hectares.

In addition to the municipal highways, Macrorregião Oeste has 14 state and 4 federal highways and the average road distance from Chapecó, the seat of the macro-region, to the coast of the State is, on average, 500 kilometers.

In 2010, the region had approximately 378,079 vehicles. The accumulated evolution of the vehicle fleet, between 2007 and 2012, was 51%. The local financial system in 2012 consisted of 287 pay points and bank branches that served the municipalities of Macrorregião Oeste. In 2012, 41 cooperatives were identified in the Macroregion.
