= NDTV (Brazilian television network) =

Brazilian regional television network based in Santa Catarina

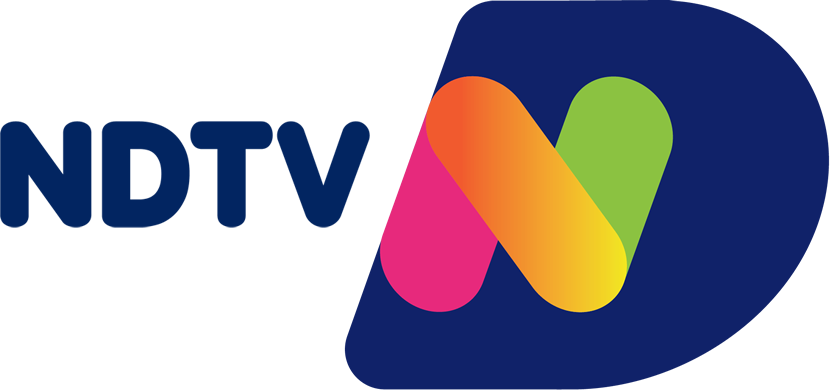
- Type: Terrestrial television network
- Country: Brazil
- Availability: Santa Catarina
- Founded: 1987; 39 years ago by Mário Petrelli
- TV stations: NDTV (Florianópolis); NDTV (Blumenau); NDTV (Chapecó); NDTV (Criciúma-Xanxerê); NDTV (Itajaí); NDTV (Joinville)
- Headquarters: Florianópolis, Santa Catarina
- Owner: Grupo ND
- Key people: Marcelo Petrelli
- Launch date: 1987; 39 years ago
- Digital channels: 28 UHF (Itajaí and Xanxerê); 30 UHF (Florianópolis, Blumenau, Chapecó, Criciúma and Joinville)
- Picture format: 1080i (HDTV); 480i (SDTV)
- Affiliation: Record
- Official website: ndmais.com.br/ndtv
- Language: Portuguese

NDTV is a Brazilian television network affiliated with Record, headquartered in Florianópolis, Santa Catarina. It operates six television stations serving the entire state. The network was formed following a split from Curitiba-based RIC TV, when it merged with the now-defunct Rede SC. This separation also led to the creation of Grupo ND, which took over the assets owned by the Petrelli family in the state of Santa Catarina.

== History ==
=== Predecessors ===
In 1987, the businessman Mário Gonzaga Petrelli opened TV O Estado, from Florianópolis, Santa Catarina, affiliated with SBT. The station maintained association with TV Planalto, from Lages, that possibilited the use of its relayers and the relaying of its programs in the greatest part of the state, forming the Sistema Catarinense de Comunicações. In 1989, was created TV O Estado, in Chapecó, until then belonging at the television stations from Paraná, that passed to cover the east region of Santa Catarina.

In 1997, Petrelli dissolved his association with TV Planalto, that continued maintaining the use of the relayers of the channel. In 2000, TV Cidade dos Príncipes, from Joinville, was created, reducing even more the participation of the old partner, that seen itself obligated to change the affiliation starting December 1 of that year, migrating to RedeTV!. From the union of the stations of Florianópolis, Chapecó and Joinville, was emerged Rede SC, that in 2004, founded one more station in Blumenau.

In February 1, 2008, Rede SC passed to integrate the Grupo RIC, formed by Mário Petrelli in the state of Paraná. With the fusion, its stations become part of RIC TV, changing also the affiliation and migrating to Rede Record. This, by its time, maintained since 1995, three local stations in Florianópolis, Itajaí and Xanxerê, that passed to the control of Grupo RIC by a local management agreement. The channel of Florianópolis became Record News Santa Catarina, and the channels of Itajaí and Xanxerê maintained the programming of Record TV, over the flag of RIC TV, that in all, passed to have 6 stations, in addition of the 4 already existents in Paraná (10 in the total).

=== Formation ===
In December 2, 2019, Grupo RIC realizated an event in the auditorium of the Federation of Industries of the State of Santa Catarina, in Florianópolis, with the presentation of the journalist Eduardo Ribeiro and of the actress Beth Goulart, to announce of the split of its actives in Santa Catarina, origining the Grupo ND, that remets to the local journal Notícias do Dia, created in 2006. At the same time, the component stations of RIC TV in the state changed the name, becoming starting the following day, NDTV, unifying its identity with the journal and with the website ND+. The changing, according to the president of the group, Marcello Corrêa Petrelli, was to a largest approximation with the people from Santa Catarina and their regional characteristics, and it already came put in practice in the last years due to changes in the communication market. For its time, Grupo Record sold 70% of its actions of the stations from Itajaí and Xanxerê, equiparing to the percentage of 30% that it had in the other four stations in the network since 2008.

In 2020, NDTV changed the studios of its station from Xanxerê, that ended its local productions in 2017, to Criciúma, creating a branch in the south of the state, but maintaining the generator in the old city. With this, in December 8, NDTV Xanxerê was renamed NDTV Criciúma, while its old coverage region passed to be covered by NDTV Chapecó.

== Stations ==
Division of NDTV's coverage area by station

Callsign	Station	Channel	Location	State
ZYB 771	NDTV Florianópolis	4 (30 UHF) (digital)	Florianópolis	Santa Catarina
ZYQ 653	NDTV Blumenau	9 (30 UHF) (digital)	Blumenau	Santa Catarina
ZYB 769	NDTV Chapecó	10 (30 UHF) (digital)	Chapecó	Santa Catarina
ZYQ 660	NDTV Criciúma	25 (30 UHF) (digital); 3 (28 UHF) (digital)	Criciúma (headquarters); Xanxerê (license)	Santa Catarina
ZYB 768	NDTV Itajaí	10 VHF (analog); 28 UHF (digital)	Itajaí	Santa Catarina
ZYP 269	NDTV Joinville	8 (30 UHF) (digital)	Joinville	Santa Catarina
