= Luiz Carlos Prates =

Brazilian journalist (born 1943)

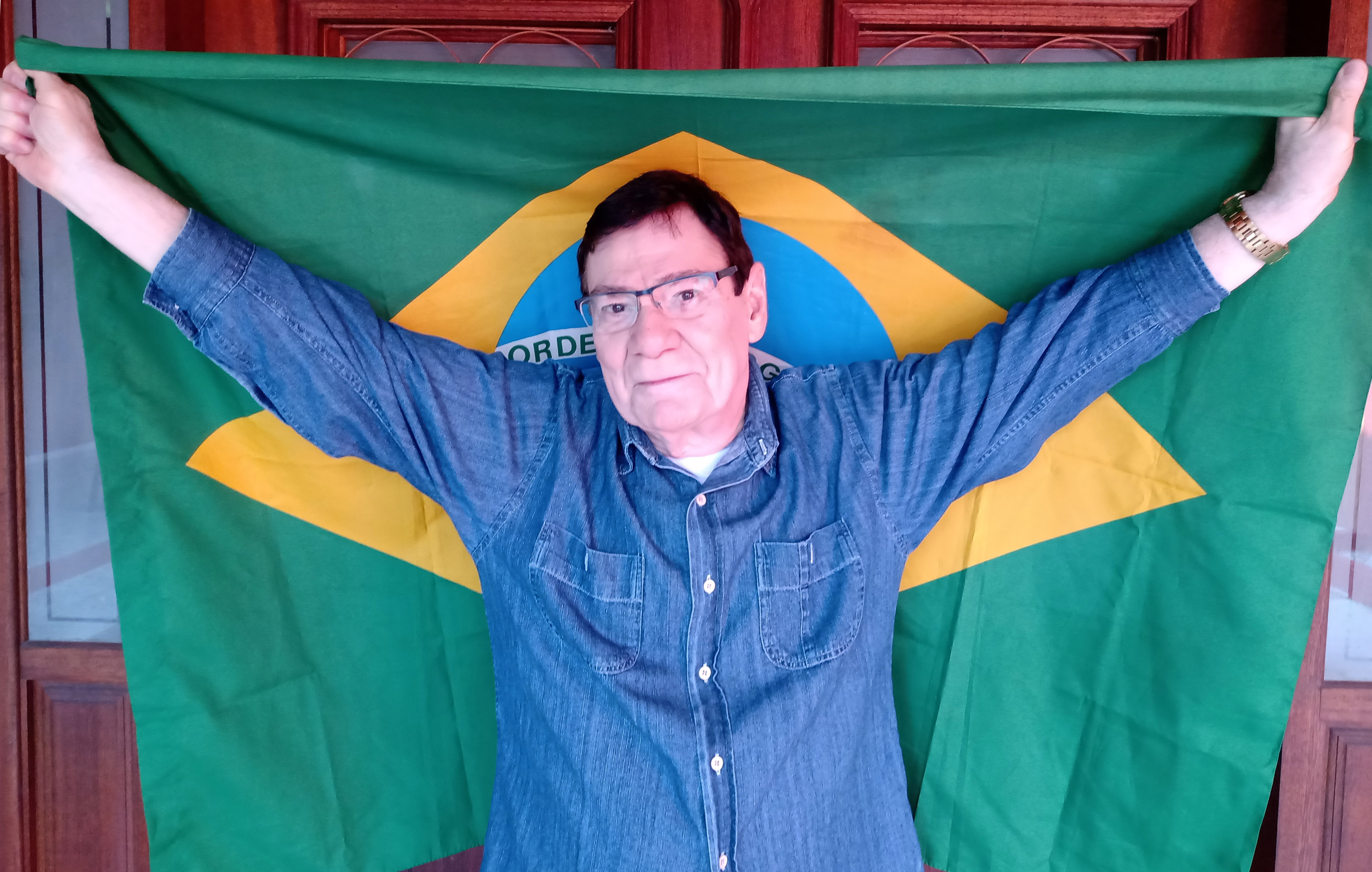
- Luiz Carlos Prates in 2020
- Born: January 26, 1943 (age 83); Santiago do Brasil, Rio Grande do Sul
- Education: Pontifícia Universidade Católica do Rio Grande do Sul
- Occupations: Journalist, psychologist
- Spouse(s): Ieda Maria, 1969-2019
- Children: Luciana Maria, Rafael, Sheila Maria

Luiz Carlos Prates (born January 26, 1943, in Santiago do Brasil) is a Brazilian journalist, psychologist, and radio sport announcer.

== Biography ==
Born in Santiago do Brasil on January 26, 1943, he lived for seven years on a nearby ranch before moving to Santa Maria, where he spent his adolescence.

He began his career in the '60s as a sports announcer for Rádio Porto Alegre. The following year he moved to Rádio Difusora and then to Rádio Guaíba. Between 1964 and 1969 he was a correspondent in Brazil for the U.S. based, Voz América.

He graduated in psychology in the '70s at the Pontifical Catholic University of Rio Grande do Sul.

He was a television sports announcer for four World Cup tournaments from 1978 to 1990.

In 1981, he moved to Criciúma and later to Florianópolis, in the State of Santa Catarina, where he worked on Record TV and Eldorado TV. In 1983, he became a sports coordinator at RBS TV, where he was an announcer and commentator on soccer matches. Famous for his right-wing political views, he has received several threats for his controversial comments. In one of them, he described Lula's government as "... miserable ...". In 2009, he defended the military-led government of 1964–85.

He is known in television for a particular gesture that keeps the average viewer watching.

From 2018 on, he has worked with RIC Group.

== Works ==
- Prates, Verdades e Elas, pp. 160, Editora Insular, Florianópolis, 2013
