= Jornal ND =

Brazilian newspaper

- Type: Daily newspaper
- Format: Tabloid
- Owner: Marcelo Corrêa Petrelli
- Publisher: Grupo ND
- Founded: March 13, 2006
- Language: Brazilian Portuguese
- Headquarters: Florianópolis, Santa Catarina
- Country: Brazil
- Circulation: Santa Catarina
- Website: jornalnd.com.br

Jornal ND (formerly Notícias do Dia) is a Brazilian newspaper headquartered in Florianópolis, Santa Catarina, owned by Grupo ND and published in tabloid format, which circulates in the state.

It counts with a daily edition that circulates in the Greater Florianópolis, approaching subjects of the areas of policy, economy, fun, culture, sports, city, region, state, country, international, etc.

Its first edition was published on March 13, 2006, in the Greater Florianópolis.

Its arrive on Internet occurred on December 16, 2010, when the first version of ND+ was presented to the people.

In 2016, the newspaper celebrated 10 years winning the award Top de Marketing e Vendas 2016, of the Association of the Dirigents of Sales and Marketing of the State of Santa Catarina, by its quality and evolution, in the category Services.

In 2019, with the change of Grupo RIC in Santa Catarina to Grupo ND, Notícias do Dia was renamed Jornal ND.

On June 2025, the newspaper published its edition number 6,000.
