= NDTV Chapecó =

NDTV Chapecó (ZYB 769)
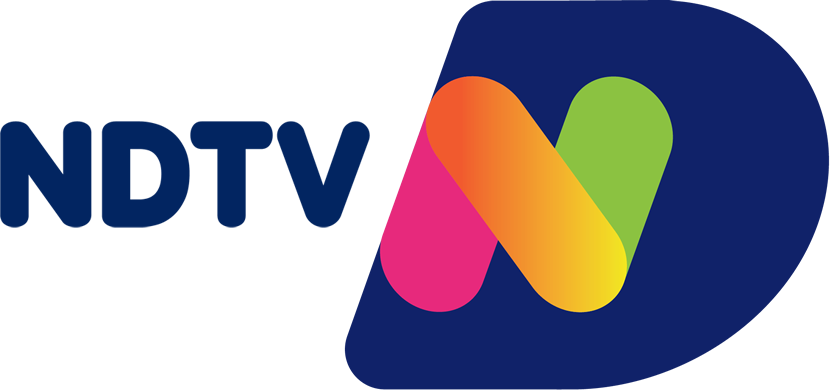
- Chapecó, Santa Catarina; Brazil
- Channels: Digital: 30 (UHF); Virtual: 10

Programming
- Affiliations: Record

Ownership
- Owner: Grupo ND; (TV O Estado Ltda.)

History
- Founded: 1987
- Former names: TV O Estado (1987-2000); Rede SC Chapecó (2000-2008); RIC TV Chapecó (2008-2019)
- Former channel numbers: Analog: 10 (VHF, 1987-2022)
- Former affiliations: Rede Manchete (1987-1989); SBT (1989-2008)

Technical information
- Licensing authority: ANATEL
- Transmitter coordinates: 27°05′29.5″S 52°35′54.1″W

Links
- Public license information: Profile
- Website: ndmais.com.br/ndtv

NDTV Chapecó (channel 10) is a television station in Chapecó, Santa Catarina, Brazil, affiliated with Record, member of NDTV and owned by Grupo ND. NDTV Chapecó's studios and transmitter are located on Sete de Setembro Street, in Presidente Médici district.

== History ==
On January 24, 1985, Mário Petrelli forms a society to compete for a second television channel in Chapecó, granted on March 21, 1986, by the president José Sarney. TV O Estado enters on air in 1987, initially affiliated with Rede Manchete and doing part of the Sistema Sul de Comunicação, leadered by TV Independência, from Curitiba, Paraná. Later, after get a license in the capital of Santa Catarina, it ends integrating in 1989 the Sistema Catarinense de Comunicações, together with TV O Estado, from Florianópolis, and TV Planalto, from Lages (the latter belonging to the businessman Roberto Amaral), all affiliated with SBT.

In 1997, Petrelli ended the partnership with Amaral, and both TV O Estado in Chapecó and in Florianópolis, began to operate separately from TV Planalto, starting they own regional network. On December 1, 2000, Rede SC is created, and with this, TV O Estado is renamed Rede SC Chapecó.

Rede SC stayed with SBT until October 2007, when Grupo Petrelli de Comunicação ended the affiliation with SBT and affiliated with Rede Record, from São Paulo. In February 2008, the business communication group of the Petrelli family is renamed RIC TV, transmitting the programming of the network of the Edir Macedo's network.

On December 3, 2019, with the dismemberment of Grupo RIC in Santa Catarina and with the creation of NDTV, it was renamed NDTV Chapecó.

On March 12, 2021, Fabiana Nascimento left the presentation of the program Ver Mais and NDTV Chapecó to dedicate to her projects. With her exit, the program was assumed by Tata Fromholz.

== Digital television ==
Channel	Video	Aspect	Programming
10.1	30 UHF	1080i	Main NDTV Chapecó programming / Record

The station started its digital transmissions on November 9, 2015, over UHF channel 30, to Chapecó and nearby areas.

=== Transition to digital signal ===
The station turned off its analog signal, over VHF channel 4, on March 4, 2022. The station's digital signal remains on its pre-transition UHF channel 30, using virtual channel 10.
