= NDTV Florianópolis =

NDTV Florianópolis (ZYB 771)
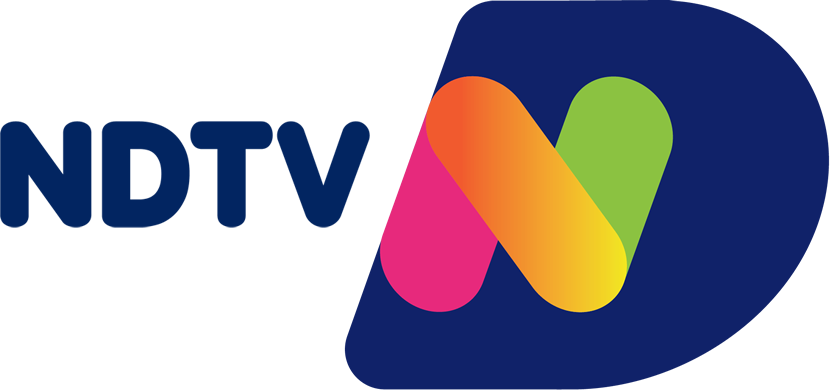
- Florianópolis, Santa Catarina; Brazil
- Channels: Digital: 30 (UHF); Virtual: 4

Programming
- Affiliations: Record

Ownership
- Owner: Grupo ND; (TV O Estado Florianópolis Ltda.)

History
- First air date: 1987
- Former names: TV O Estado (1987-2000); Rede SC Florianópolis (2000-2008); RIC TV Florianópolis (2008-2019)
- Former channel numbers: Analog: 4 (VHF, 1987-2018)
- Former affiliations: SBT (1987-2008)

Technical information
- Licensing authority: ANATEL
- ERP: 4.4 kW
- Transmitter coordinates: 27°35′25.7″S 48°31′57.3″W

Links
- Public license information: Profile
- Website: ndmais.com.br/ndtv

NDTV Florianópolis (channel 4) is a television station in Florianópolis, Santa Catarina, Brazil, affiliated with Record, flagship station of NDTV and owned by Grupo ND. NDTV Florianópolis's studios and transmitter are located on Avenida do Antão, at the Morro da Cruz.

== History ==
In the mid-80s, the businessman Mário Petrelli decides to resume his investments in communication through an association with Sistema Catarinense de Comunicações, owner of TV Planalto, from Lages, affiliated with SBT, that had a relayer in Florianópolis over VHF channel 4. The channel becomes the generator of TV O Estado, launched in 1987, also affiliated with the network from São Paulo. The association with Sistema Catarinense de Comunicações possibilited the use of some of its relayers.

In 1997, Petrelli dissolved his association with TV Planalto, that continued maintaining the use of the relayers of the channel. In 2000, the association is definitely ended with the creation of Rede SC in December 1, that changed the name of the station to Rede SC Florianópolis.

On February 1, 2008, Rede SC passed to integrate the Grupo RIC, formed by Mário Petrelli in the state of Paraná. With the fusion, its stations become part of RIC TV, changing also the affiliation and migrating to Rede Record. This, by its time, maintained since 1995, three local stations in Florianópolis, Itajaí and Xanxerê, that passed to the control of Grupo RIC by a local management agreement. The channel of Florianópolis became Record News Santa Catarina, and the channels of Itajaí and Xanxerê maintained the programming of Record TV, over the flag of RIC TV, that in all, passed to have 6 stations, in addition of the 4 already existents in Paraná (10 in the total).

On December 2, 2019, Grupo RIC held an event in the auditorium of the Federation of Industries of the State of Santa Catarina, in Florianópolis, with the presentation of the journalist Eduardo Ribeiro and of the actress Beth Goulart, to announce of the sale of its assets in Santa Catarina to Grupo ND, publisher of the local newspaper Notícias do Dia, created in 2006. At the same time, the component stations of RIC TV in the state changed their name to NDTV, unifying their identity with the newspaper and with the website ND+. The changing, according to the president of the group, Marcello Corrêa Petrelli, was to a largest approximation with the people from Santa Catarina and their regional characteristics, and it already came put in practice in the last years due to changes in the communication market.

== Digital television ==
Channel	Video	Aspect	Programming
4.1	30 UHF	1080i	Main NDTV Florianópolis programming / Record

=== Transition to digital signal ===
The station turned off its analog signal, over VHF channel 4, on February 28, 2018, as part of the federally mandated transition from analog to digital television. The station's digital signal remains on its pre-transition UHF channel 30, using virtual channel 4.
