= Prater (disambiguation) =

Prater may also refer to:

== Places ==
- The Wiener Prater, a large public park in Leopoldstadt, Vienna
  - The Wurstelprater, an amusement park within the Wiener Prater
  - Ernst-Happel-Stadion, a football stadium in Leopoldstadt, Vienna, known as the Prater Stadium (Praterstadion) from construction (1928) until 1992
- Bohemian Prater (Böhmischer Prater), a small amusement park at the edge of Vienna
- Prater, Virginia
- Prater Island, an island in the Isar river in Munich

== People ==
- Dave Prater (1937–1988), American musician
- Matt Prater (born 1984), American football player
- Stanley Henry Prater (1890–1960), British naturalist

== Other ==
- Prater Violet, a book by Christopher Isherwood
- Prater (film), a 1924 German silent film
