= RIC TV =

Brazilian regional television network based in Paraná

RIC
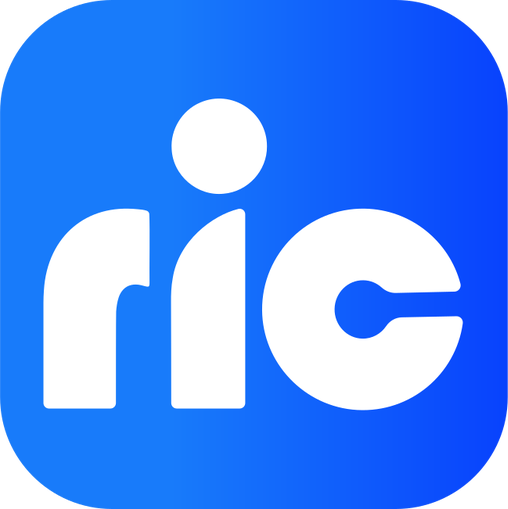
- Country: Brazil
- Availability: Paraná
- Founded: 1986
- Key people: Leonardo Petrelli Neto, Marcello Petrelli.
- Affiliation: RecordTV

RIC TV (Rede Independência de Comunicação or in English Independence Network Communications) is a Brazilian television network affiliated to RecordTV.

== History ==
It was created in 1986 in Curitiba, Paraná, with the founding of Sistema Sul de Comunicação's television network, with TV Independência Curitiba, a Manchete affiliate. Initially it aimed to start broadcasts in September 1986, but due to commercial considerations from TV Curitiba, which had left Band to affiliate itself with Manchete, only to rejoin Band due to ratings issues, the main station started broadcasting in July when TV Curitiba change affiliations. In 1989, the group set up a station in Guarapuava, which was sold in 1993 and is now RPC Guarapuava.

When Edir Macedo's Record network bought 30% of the company's shares, the stations became affiliated with the network. In 2008, the group started to operate in Santa Catarina and lasted until 2019, when the assets in the state were sold to Grupo ND as NDTV.

== List of stations ==
=== Paraná ===
- RIC TV Curitiba (Curitiba) - 7
- RIC TV Cornélio Procópio (Cornélio Procópio) - 12
- RIC TV Maringá (Maringá) - 13
- RIC TV Toledo (Toledo) - 7
