= Grupo ND =

TV O Estado Florianópolis Ltda.
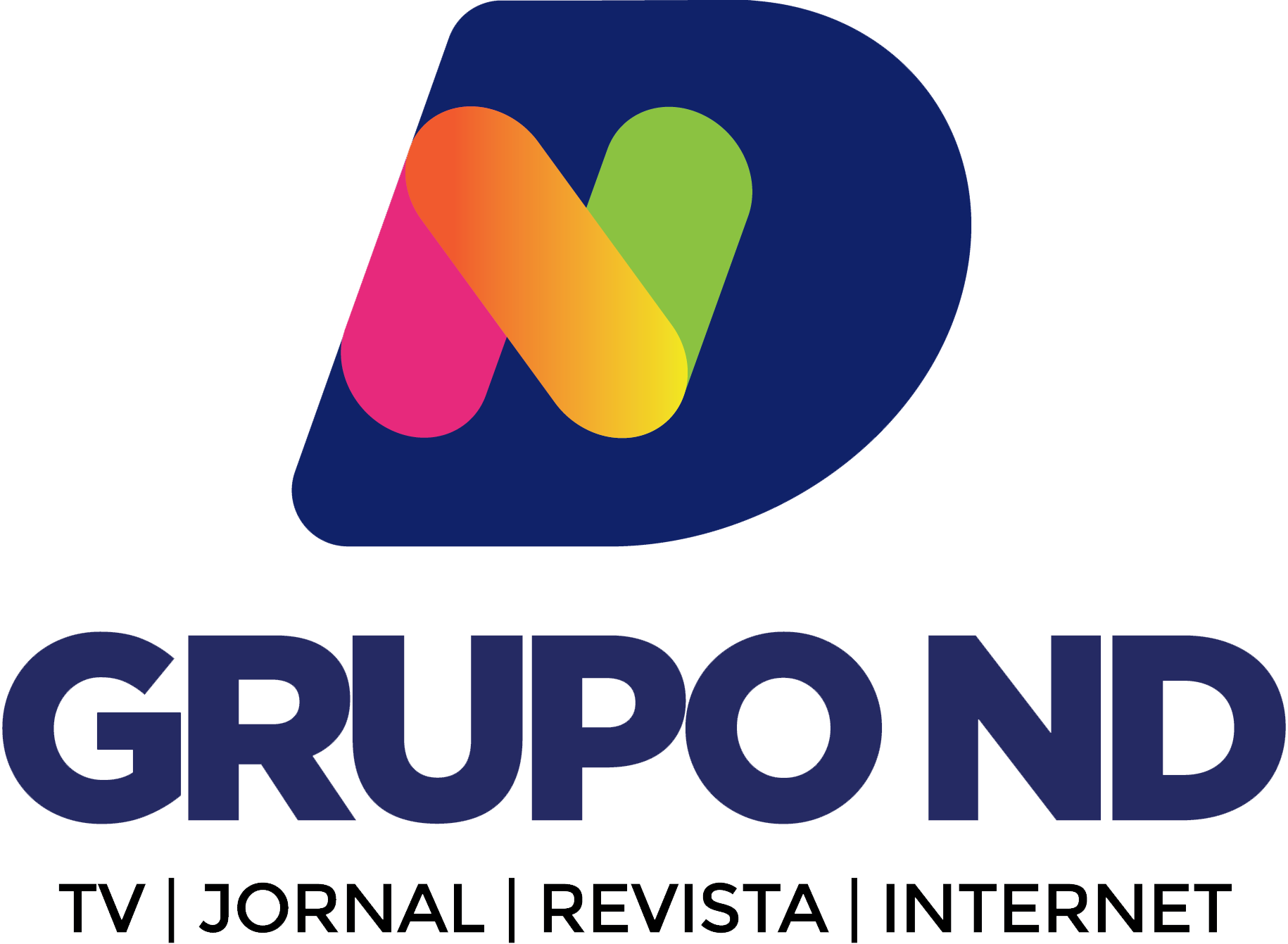
- Trade name: Grupo ND
- Type: Private
- Industry: Broadcasting
- Genre: Communications
- Founded: December 3, 2019
- Founder: Marcello Petrelli
- Headquarters: Florianópolis, Santa Catarina, Brazil
- Area served: Santa Catarina
- Subsidiaries: NDTV
- Website: grupond.com.br

Grupo ND is a Brazilian media conglomerate headquartered in Florianópolis, Santa Catarina. It was founded on December 3, 2019, starting of the split of the companies of Grupo RIC from Santa Catarina. The group is formed by the newspaper Jornal ND, whose initials come from Notícias do Dia, its old name, in addition to seven television stations, three radio stations and the website ND+, totalizing twelve vehicles.

== Actives ==
=== Television ===
- NDTV
  - NDTV Florianópolis
  - NDTV Blumenau
  - NDTV Chapecó
  - NDTV Criciúma
  - NDTV Itajaí
  - NDTV Joinville
- Record News Santa Catarina (Note: Owned by Grupo Record, operated through an agree of local management.)

=== Radio ===
- Alpha FM Florianópolis
- NDFM Chapecó
- NDFM Joinville

=== Internet ===
- ND+

=== Printed media ===
- Jornal ND

=== Others ===
- ND Sinergy
- OD Drive
