= NSC TV Florianópolis =

NSC TV Florianópolis (ZYB 763)
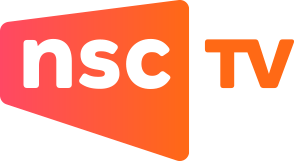
- Florianópolis, Santa Catarina; Brazil
- Channels: Digital: 33 (UHF); Virtual: 12

Programming
- Affiliations: TV Globo

Ownership
- Owner: NSC Comunicação; (NC Comunicações S.A.)

History
- Founded: May 1, 1979
- Former names: TV Catarinense (1979-1983); RBS TV Florianópolis (1983-2017)
- Former channel numbers: Analog: 12 (VHF, 1979-2018)

Technical information
- Licensing authority: ANATEL
- ERP: 4 kW
- Transmitter coordinates: 27°35′24.7″S 48°32′2.2″W

Links
- Public license information: Profile
- Website: redeglobo.globo.com/sc/nsctv

NSC TV Florianópolis (channel 12) is a television station in Florianópolis, Santa Catarina, Brazil, affiliated with TV Globo, flagship station of NSC TV and owned by NSC Comunicação. NSC TV Florianópolis' studios and transmitter are located on Morro da Cruz.

== History ==
=== Background and implementation ===
In the 1970s, after consolidating its position as the largest communications group in Rio Grande do Sul, Rede Brasil Sul de Comunicações began expansion plans for the state of Santa Catarina, which at that time, despite similarities with the neighboring state, it still had an incipient communications industry, with outdated marketing and advertising strategies and divided between regional groups with strong political activity or through civil society and business organizations, which appeared to be fertile ground for the company from Rio Grande do Sul.

In 1976, the Federal Government opened competition for a second television channel in Florianópolis, which until then had only TV Cultura, inaugurated in 1970, and a retransmitter of TV Coligadas, from Blumenau, inaugurated in 1969, which operated on channel 12 VHF. RBS participated in the bidding against local groups such as the newspaper O Estado, owned by businessman José Matusalém Comelli and former governor Aderbal Ramos da Silva; TV Coligadas itself, which belonged to businessman Mário Petrelli, who maintained ties with the politician Jorge Bornhausen; and Darci Lopes, who was a shareholder of TV Cultura.

With the exception of the latter, the competitors had strong political support, which was essential to obtain benefits that were granted directly by the federal government. Knowing that even though the Ramos da Silva and Bornhausen supported the government through ARENA, they had a historic political feud that predated the dictatorial regime in force in the country, the directors of RBS sought to convince the military that they intended to implement a television that had as its main characteristic the technical and professional factor, without political ties. Even so, the president of the group, Maurício Sirotsky Sobrinho, sought out Governor Konder Reis, who was a neutral element in the dispute, and had the power to veto the concession, and managed to get his support to win the competition. With the endorsement of Konder Reis, and also counting on the prestige of the military along with Sirotsky and businessman Roberto Marinho, owner of Rede Globo (which also sought to solve the problems of coverage of its signal in Florianópolis, which was the only capital where it lost audience across the country), President Ernesto Geisel granted RBS the concession of channel 12 VHF on April 13, 1977.

During the implementation of the station, in 1978, RBS commissioned a marketing study, which, in addition to proving the market deficiencies mentioned above, showed that television would be fundamental for the integration of the existing "islands" in the state and the restructuring of the entire its communication industry, which made RBS concentrate all its efforts on creating a network of stations similar to the one that existed in Rio Grande do Sul and strategies to reformulate the entire production chain. Another concern of the group, taking into account the fear of the local society that saw the arrival of the new station as an "invasion" of the gauchos in the local culture and customs, was also to form a body of professionals almost exclusively from Santa Catarina, taking them for training and internships at TV Gaúcha in Porto Alegre in the months leading up to the inauguration.

=== TV Catarinense (1979–1983) ===
The initial forecast was that TV Catarinense would be inaugurated in July 1979, when the contract between Rede Globo and TV Coligadas would come to an end. However, with the intention of sabotaging the premiere after losing the bid for channel 12, and likewise benefiting TV Cultura, which had just been acquired by Mário Petrelli to try to cope with the arrival of RBS in the state, TV Affiliates decided to anticipate the end of their affiliation by three months, in addition to boycotting the telenovelas that Globo had premiered in the first half of the year (Memories of Love, Feijão Maravilha and Pai Herói), replacing them with films. Thus, TV Catarinense was inaugurated in a hurry, on May 1, 1979, with the studios still under construction in Morro da Cruz and with equipment still to be delivered and installed.

The opening ceremony took place at noon, with a clip of images of Santa Catarina and a speech by the president of RBS, Maurício Sirotsky Sobrinho, made from the studios of TV Gaúcha in Porto Alegre. At first, as it was not yet able to generate local programming with the same characteristics as its sister company in Porto Alegre, TV Catarinense occupied the standard programming times of Globo, with local blocks of Jornal Hoje, Jornal Nacional, Jornal da Globo, in addition to of attractions such as the Celso Pamplona Program, a gossip column, Clubinho, a children's news program that followed the same premise as Globinho, shown by the network's branches, and Jornal das Sete, shown at night. Only on November 5, when it already had full technical conditions, did Jornal do Almoço debut, replacing Jornal Hoje. And to solve the problem of soap operas that were boycotted by TV Coligadas, the broadcaster aired compacts that summarized the chapters that had already been aired, until they reached the network's exhibition. In a short time, the station established itself in the audience leadership, and since then it has never lost that position.

When it went on air, TV Catarinense already covered 75% of the state, as it had set up a network of microwave relays on its own, which took its signal beyond Greater Florianópolis, dispensing with the use of the public network maintained by TELESC, which was used by competitors, and maintaining partnerships with city halls and local associations. The broadcaster expanded its coverage with the purchase of new generators, the first of which was TV Santa Catarina, from Joinville, which went on air via an operating agreement with RBS, 14 days after the inauguration of channel 12, and shortly after, it was purchased by the group. The same would happen with TV Coligadas in 1980, and with the newly opened TV Cultura in Chapecó, in 1982, after entrepreneur Mário Petrelli rethought his work in the media and temporarily disposed of his vehicles. The advertising market also received great incentives from the broadcaster, with the creation of awards, events, workshops and video production companies, as well as the local community, through events sponsored by RBS and social mobilization campaigns, such as donations for victims of floods in 1983 and 1984.

=== RBS TV Florianópolis (1983–2017) ===
On October 1, 1983, following the standardization of RBS TV stations, it was renamed RBS TV Florianópolis. In the following years, both the broadcaster and the now-named Grupo RBS expanded their operations in Santa Catarina, and in the case of TV, local programming was strengthened, with specials in honor of icons of local culture, such as Franklin Cascaes and Victor Meirelles, or historical events such as the Guerra do Contestado, and the production of itinerant editions of Jornal do Almoço in the municipalities of the state or at events such as the Festa Nacional do Pinhão and Oktoberfest.

Assuming the bi-state nature of RBS TV, the Florianópolis and Porto Alegre broadcasters also jointly produced programs shown in both states, such as Projeto Conesul, Campo & Lavoura and Vida & Saúde, and during most of the 1990s and 1980, maintained extensive local programming in the daily range and during the weekends, even taking down the exhibition of network attractions, in addition to promoting campaigns such as the duplication of the BR-101, due to the high rate of accidents, and contests and festivals such as Garota Verão and Planeta Atlântida (the latter together with Rede Atlântida), which had their own versions in both states.

On March 7, 2016, Grupo RBS announces the sale of the station and other operations in Santa Catarina to entrepreneurs Lírio Parisotto (Videolar-Innova) and Carlos Sanchez (Grupo NC). Parisotto later leaves the company due to the scandal with Luíza Brunet, making the Grupo NC and its shareholders full owners of the new companies.

=== NSC TV Florianópolis (2017–present) ===
On August 15, 2017, RBS TV in Santa Catarina completes the transition process to NSC Comunicação, and is renamed NSC TV. RBS TV Florianópolis then changes its name to NSC TV Florianópolis, as well as the other stations in the state.

== Digital television ==
Channel	Video	Aspect	Programming
12.1	33 UHF	1080i	Main NSC TV Florianópolis programming / TV Globo

Due to the floods in Santa Catarina, digital television in Florianópolis, which was to be inaugurated on November 25, 2008, had its launch postponed to February 5, 2009, in a special session at the Legislative Assembly of Santa Catarina. Jornal do Almoço on February 6, a special about the new technology, was the first local production to be broadcast in high definition.

=== Transition to digital signal ===
The station turned off its analog signal, over VHF channel 12, on February 28, 2018, as part of the federally mandated transition from analog to digital television. The station's digital signal remains on its pre-transition UHF channel 34, using virtual channel 12.
