= Xanxerê =

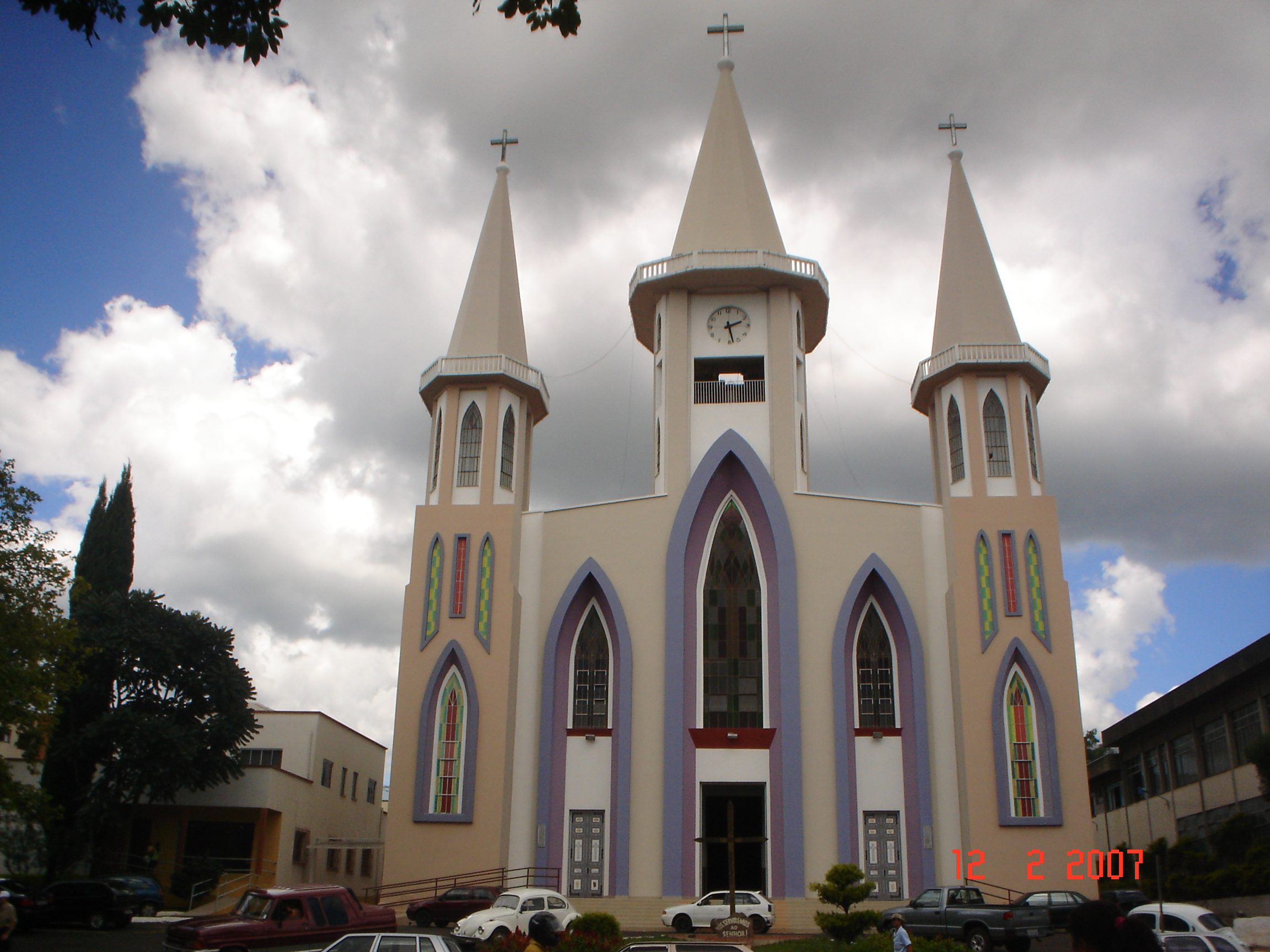
- City's central church

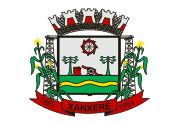
- Flag Coat of arms
- Nickname: Portuguese: Capital Estadual do Milho (The state capital of corn)
- Location in Santa Catarina

- Location in Brazil
- Coordinates: 26°52′37″S 52°24′14″W
- Country: Brazil
- Region: South
- State: Santa Catarina
- Mesoregion: West of Santa Catarina
- Microregion: Xanxerê
- Founded: 27 February 1954

Government
  - Mayor: Ademiri 'Miri' Gasparini

Area
  - Total: 377.764 km^{2} (145.855 sq mi)
- Elevation: 800 m (2,600 ft)

Population (2020)
  - Total: 51,642
  - Density: 136.70/km^{2} (354.06/sq mi)
- Demonym: Xanxerenses
- Time zone: UTC-3 (UTC-3)
  - Summer (DST): UTC-2 (UTC-2)
- CEP postal code: 89820-000
- Area code: 49
- HDI (2010): 0,775
- Website: Municipality official website

Xanxerê (Portuguese pronunciation: [ʃɐ̃.ʃeˈɾe]) is a city in Santa Catarina, southern Brazil. Italian and German are the mainstream cultures, having been brought by immigrants in the early 20th century through the migration of the "gauchos".

The city is one of the main production centers of maize in Brazil and serves as an important industrial, commercial and service center for western Santa Catarina. It is located in a key position for trades via Mercosul.

Xanxerê is the headquarters of the Association of Cities of Alto Irani (AMAI), composed of 17 "municípios".

On April 20, 2015, a destructive tornado hit the city. Many homes and businesses were severely damaged or destroyed, two people died, and another 120 were injured. The tornado was rated F3 on the Fujita Scale, according meteorologists. At least 2,600 homes were damaged or destroyed.

== Climate ==
Climate data for Xanxerê, elevation 841 m (2,759 ft), (1976–2005)
Month	Jan	Feb	Mar	Apr	May	Jun	Jul	Aug	Sep	Oct	Nov	Dec	Year
Record high °C (°F)	36.2 (97.2)	34.0 (93.2)	34.0 (93.2)	30.8 (87.4)	29.6 (85.3)	28.1 (82.6)	28.2 (82.8)	30.6 (87.1)	32.5 (90.5)	33.2 (91.8)	34.8 (94.6)	35.0 (95.0)	36.2 (97.2)
Mean daily maximum °C (°F)	28.1 (82.6)	27.6 (81.7)	26.7 (80.1)	23.9 (75.0)	21.5 (70.7)	19.9 (67.8)	19.9 (67.8)	21.7 (71.1)	22.5 (72.5)	24.3 (75.7)	26.2 (79.2)	27.7 (81.9)	24.2 (75.5)
Daily mean °C (°F)	21.1 (70.0)	20.9 (69.6)	19.8 (67.6)	16.8 (62.2)	14.2 (57.6)	12.8 (55.0)	12.4 (54.3)	14.0 (57.2)	15.2 (59.4)	17.0 (62.6)	18.9 (66.0)	20.5 (68.9)	17.0 (62.5)
Mean daily minimum °C (°F)	15.8 (60.4)	15.9 (60.6)	14.6 (58.3)	11.4 (52.5)	8.9 (48.0)	7.8 (46.0)	7.1 (44.8)	8.4 (47.1)	9.9 (49.8)	11.5 (52.7)	12.9 (55.2)	14.8 (58.6)	11.6 (52.8)
Record low °C (°F)	4.0 (39.2)	3.0 (37.4)	3.6 (38.5)	0.0 (32.0)	−3.8 (25.2)	−11.6 (11.1)	−11.1 (12.0)	−7.9 (17.8)	−3.8 (25.2)	0.0 (32.0)	1.6 (34.9)	4.4 (39.9)	−11.6 (11.1)
Average precipitation mm (inches)	190.0 (7.48)	177.0 (6.97)	155.0 (6.10)	141.0 (5.55)	170.0 (6.69)	169.0 (6.65)	148.0 (5.83)	116.0 (4.57)	196.0 (7.72)	239.0 (9.41)	172.0 (6.77)	190.0 (7.48)	2,063 (81.22)
Average relative humidity (%)	81	82	82	82	83	83	81	79	79	79	77	78	81
Mean monthly sunshine hours	215	201	181	174	187	152	174	179	159	198	210	216	2,246
Source 1: Empresa Brasileira de Pesquisa Agropecuária (EMBRAPA)
Source 2: Instituto Nacional de Meteorologia (INMET), Climatempo (precipitation)
