= Luíza Brunet =

Brazilian model (born 1962)

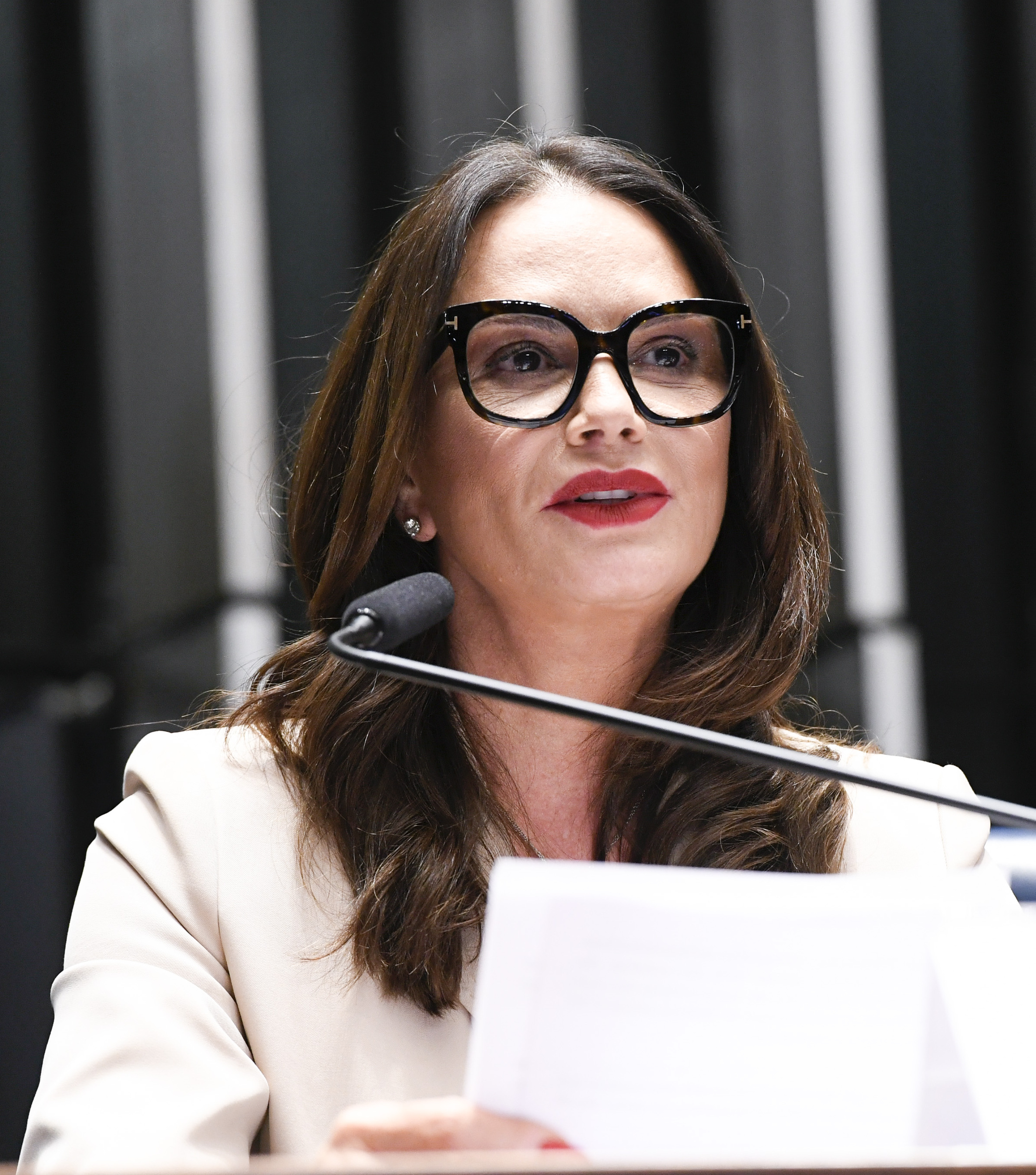
- Brunet in 2023
- Born: 24 May 1962 (age 64); Itaporã, Mato Grosso do Sul, Brazil
- Spouses: Gumercindo Brunet (m. 1980; div. 1984) Armando Fernandez (m. 1985; div. 2008) Lírio Parisotto (m. 2011; div. 2016)
- Children: 2, including Yasmin
- Modeling information
- Height: 1.76 m (5 ft 9 in)
- Hair color: Brown
- Eye color: Brown
- Website: www.luizabrunet.com.br

Luíza Botelho Brunet (born 24 May 1962) is a former model for many international clothing brands. She has a beauty and fashion-themed website.

She was Madrinha da Bateria (Godmother of the Percussion, "Queen of the Drums") firstly for the Portela school until 1993, then for the Imperatriz Leopoldinense until 2005. She returned as Madrinha da Bateria for the Leopoldinense in 2008 and 2009.

A former model, Brunet appeared on the cover of Brazilian Playboy three times (in 1983, 1984 and 1986). She is the mother of model Yasmin Brunet.
