= Mário Petrelli =

Brazilian media businessman (1935–2020)

- Born: May 31, 1935; Florianópolis, Santa Catarina, Brazil
- Died: April 22, 2020 (aged 84); Florianópolis, Santa Catarina, Brazil
- Occupation: Media businessman
- Children: 5

Mário José Gonzaga Petrelli, better known as Mário Petrelli (May 31, 1935 – April 22, 2020), was a Brazilian media businessman. Petrelli founded Grupo RIC, currently with operations in Paraná, and Grupo ND, headquartered in Santa Catarina; Both groups have news websites and radio stations, in addition to television stations affiliated with Record. The operation from Santa Catarina still has a printed newspaper, Jornal ND (formerly Notícias do Dia).

== Biography ==
Born in Florianópolis, Petrelli changed to Curitiba at the age of 15, where he also graduated in law by the Federal University of Paraná, in 1959. While Petrelli studied, he started to work as a politics reporter in Curitiba, to the newspapers O Dia and A Tarde and, later, he became executive of the sector of insurance.

On the 70s, alongside partners like Jorge Bornhausen, Flávio de Almeida Coelho and João Saad, among others, Petrelli became one of the owners of Jornal de Santa Catarina, from Blumenau. The newspaper, founded in 1971, passed by its first big crisis, with misunderstanding between the partner founders (Flávio Coelho, Wilson Melro and Caetano Deeke), when Petrelli was invited by Coelho to help him in the management of the business after the exit of the two other founders. On this transation, Petrelli also acquired partnership in TV Coligadas, from Blumenau. He also was owner of the TVs Cultura, from Florianópolis and Chapecó.

Petrelli was the pioneer in taking over the signal of SBT and Record to the Southern Brazil. In 1987, he founded in Paraná Rede Independência de Comunicação (RIC), relaying initially the signal of the defunct Rede Manchete, that would be replaced in 1995 by the programming of Record. In the 2000s, Grupo RIC began operating in Santa Catarina, but since 2019, it was renamed Grupo ND.

Petrelli died in Florianópolis in 2020, at age 84. Since 2008, he had been widower of Dircéa Corrêa Petrelli, with whom he had five children.
