= TV Meio Norte Piauí =

TV Meio Norte Piauí (ZYB 350)
- Teresina, Piauí; Brazil
- Channels: Digital: 22 (UHF); Virtual: 4
- Branding: TV Meio Norte Piauí; Rede Meio Norte

Programming
- Affiliations: Rede Meio Norte

Ownership
- Owner: Grupo Meio; (Sistema Timon de Radiodifusão Ltda.)

History
- First air date: April 25, 1985
- Former names: TV Timon (1986-1995); TV Meio Norte (1995-2024)
- Former channel numbers: Analog: 7 (VHF, 1972–2018)
- Former affiliations: SBT (1986-2000); Rede Bandeirantes (1985; 2000-2010)

Technical information
- Licensing authority: ANATEL
- ERP: 2.95 kW
- Transmitter coordinates: 5°6′41.9″S 42°47′45.3″W

Links
- Public license information: Profile
- Website: meionews.com/rede-meionorte

TV Meio Norte Piauí (channel 7) is a television station licensed to Timon, Maranhão, but headquartered in Teresina, capital of Piauí. The station is the flagship of Rede Meio Norte, which became a network in its own right after disaffiliating from Band in 2011.

== History ==
=== TV Timon (1985-1994) ===
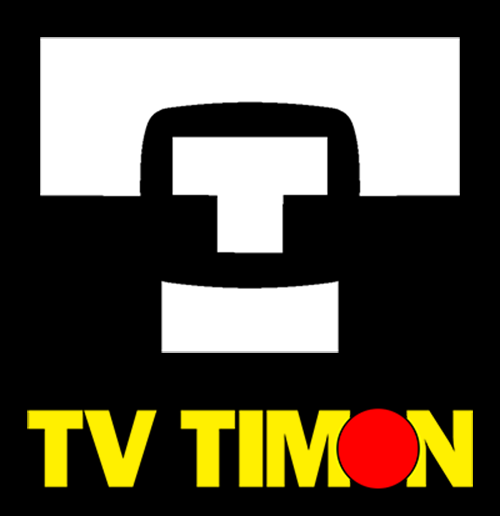
Logo used between 1986 and 1994, when its name was TV Timon

TV Timon went on air on April 25, 1985, as a relayer of Rede Bandeirantes' programming, on VHF channel 7, by initiative of businessman Paulo Guimarães, becoming the first television station in eastern Maranhão and the second in greater Teresina, which up until then only had TV Clube, founded in 1972.

Its first local programming began in August of that year, with promos announcing the visit of then-president of the republic José Sarney to Teresina. At the end of the year, when TV Pioneira's test broadcasts began, TV Timon suspended its operations, since its competitor had signed a contract with Rede Bandeirantes, while its programming was being relayed illegally, even though it was still in an experimental phase. Three months later, on March 23, 1986, the station resumed its operations, as an affiliate of SBT. Its first local programs, however, did not begin until May 1987. Although based in Timon, in the state of Maranhão, its target audience was in Teresina, in the state of Piauí Piauí, where it opened an administrative and commercial office on Coelho de Resende Street, in the center of the Piauian capital, to follow the needs of the neighboring state.

In the early 1990s, the station started a restructuring period with the creation of Grupo Meio Norte de Comunicação. Complementary to TV Timon's operations, the group launched radio stations Mirante FM (founded in 1991, currently Meio Norte FM) and Mirante AM (founded in 1992, later renamed Rádio Meio Norte, currently defunct), and acquired from family members the assets of journalist Hélder Feitosa, which included newspaper O Estado (currently Meio Norte), Poty FM (currently Boa FM) and the license of the defunct Rádio Poty, both based in Teresina. The station started building its new headquarters to aggregate all assets in the Piauian capital, in the Monte Castelo neighborhood, leaving the city of Timon at the end of 1994, in a change that was anticipated after a windstorm knocked down its transmission tower and took its signal off the air for 8 hours. Its former headquarters at Planalto Formosa were later used by TV Mirante Cocais, where a subsidiary of the station exists since 2013.

=== TV Meio Norte (1995-present) ===
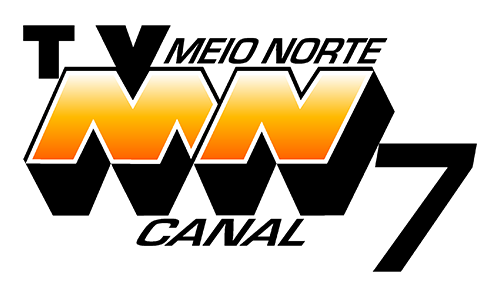
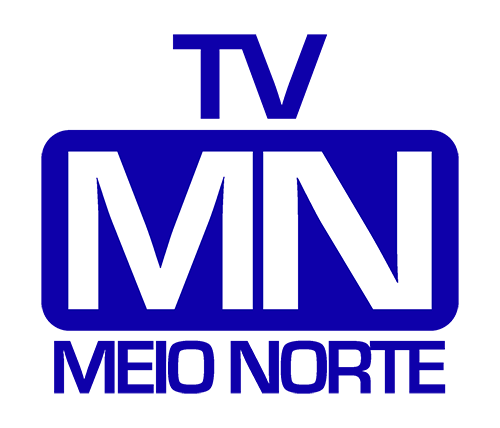
Logos used by the station between the second half of the 1990s and the beginning of 2000, in 1995 and 1997. The identities were also used by Grupo Meio Norte and its homonymous co-brothers.

On January 1, 1995, marking the definitive start of a new phase, TV Timon was renamed TV Meio Norte, as a reference to the Brazilian subregion which converges the states of Maranhão and Piauí, like the station.The idea for the name appeared during the inauguration of the new headquarters in Teresina, when the then senator José Sarney spoke to those present and mentioned that the station "was being established in the mid-north of the country". With the move to the east side of the Parnaíba River, TV Meio Norte expanded its coverage area with the installation of microwave relay stations from the state company ETELPI. In May that year, the station started maintaining its own system of relayers, with the beginning of its satellite broadcasts, becoming the first television station in Latin America using an Intelsat transponder for this end.

This expansion, however, was not exclusively limited to Piauí. As means to promote its Poupa Ganha lottery, created in May 1995 by Grupo Meio Norte and experiencing rapid nationwide expansion, the station expanded its signal to the capitals of Maranhão and Ceará, from September 13, 1997. In São Luís, the station went on air on UHF channel 28, a Serviço Especial de Televisão por Assinatura (TVA) license owned by Sistema Mirante de Comunicação (whose owner, Fernando Sarney, was an aide of Paulo Guimarães) and inactive until then. In Fortaleza, it rented Canal 54 Fortaleza, owned by businessman Raimundo Anselmo Mororó and up until then relayed MTV Brasil. In both cities, SBT was served by local affiliates (TV Difusora e TV Cidade, respectively), and in order not to cause conflict with them, the relayers started airing CNT when TV Meio Norte was not showing local programming. The Fortaleza relay station ended up relaying SBT, in the period between October 1998 and JAnuary 1999, when the network had no affiliate in the region between its disaffiliation with TV Cidade (which joined Record) and its agreement with TV Jangadeiro.

==== Expansion of its programming and divergences with SBT (1998-2000) ====
In 1998, the station's schedule was reinforced with the debut of several local programs, especially in the afternoon and early evening, slots generally dedicated to showing local content. However, Meio Norte started wasting most slots given to SBT's slots for local programming, airing national programs such as Programa Livre on tape delay and ceasing to air Cinema em Casa and Festival de Desenhos.

In 1999, SBT pressured the station to obey its local airtime slots, but TV Meio Norte continued altering the schedule. With the impasse, relations between the two deteriorate and SBT then seeks a new affiliation in Piauí. At year's end, TV Cidade Verde, a Rede Bandeirantes since 1986, is announced as SBT's new affiliate, while TV Meio Norte started negotiating with Band, at the same time that announcements began to run on the schedule about the reasons why it was leaving the Silvio Santos network. Competition between Poupa Ganha and Tele Sena, a capitalization bond marketed by Grupo Silvio Santos, which was already present in several Brazilian states, was also pointed out as a possible additional reason for the termination by SBT.

==== Rede Bandeirantes (2000-2010) ====
On January 9, 2000, TV Meio Norte exchanged affiliations with TV Cidade Verde, becoming a Rede Bandeirantes affiliate, and leaving SBT after close to 14 anos of affiliation. According to the station, Band had offered "better conditions" regarding its local programming. To celebrate the fact, TV Meio Norte held a big event at Parque Potycabana. On August 15, 2001, almost a year after Poupa Ganha had its activities suspended by Caixa Econômica Federal due to irregularities, TV Meio Norte shut down its relay stations in São Luís and Fortaleza, concentrating its transmissions exclusively in Piauí.

In 2004, with the debut of new programs, TV Meio Norte began producing almost 14 consecutive hours of local programming on weekdays (5am-7:20pm), keeping the Band relays only between 7:20pm and 5am. The measure ends up causing complaints from viewers due to the non-airing of programs produced by the national network, but at the same time that the changes occurred, Sistema Integrado de Comunicação Meio Norte activated a relay on UHF channel 19, which began showing Band's network programming in full until 2007.

In 2009, TV Meio Norte began the process of implementing a full-time local schedule, starting by showing weekly programs between 10pm and 11:30pm, and starting to air Band programs shown at a time with almost two hours of delay. On May 9, favoring a repeat of Planeta Show, TV Meio Norte did not air Miss Brasil 2009, infuriating the viewers who wanted to see the pageant. The same happened with the next year's edition.

In 2010, Band's national programming slots on TV Meio Norte were limited to just the live broadcast of sporting events and some news programs, in addition to some programs shown with delay in prime time. While the schedule was already almost entirely local, dissatisfaction among viewers and Band itself with the programming became common. In January, presenter Beto Rego declared on Ronda that the station was hiring several professionals to put together entirely local programming. However, it was only in May that TV Meio Norte officially announced that it intended to leave Band to become an independent station. It was initially predicted that this would be done after the 2010 FIFA World Cup, between July or August, but plans were postponed so that the station could gradually organize itself to continue without national programming. The Band network feed would then be shown again on UHF channel 19, where the RedeTV! signal would be aired interspersed with programs from TV Meio Norte, porém, isso nunca aconteceu.

==== Independent programming (2011-present) ====
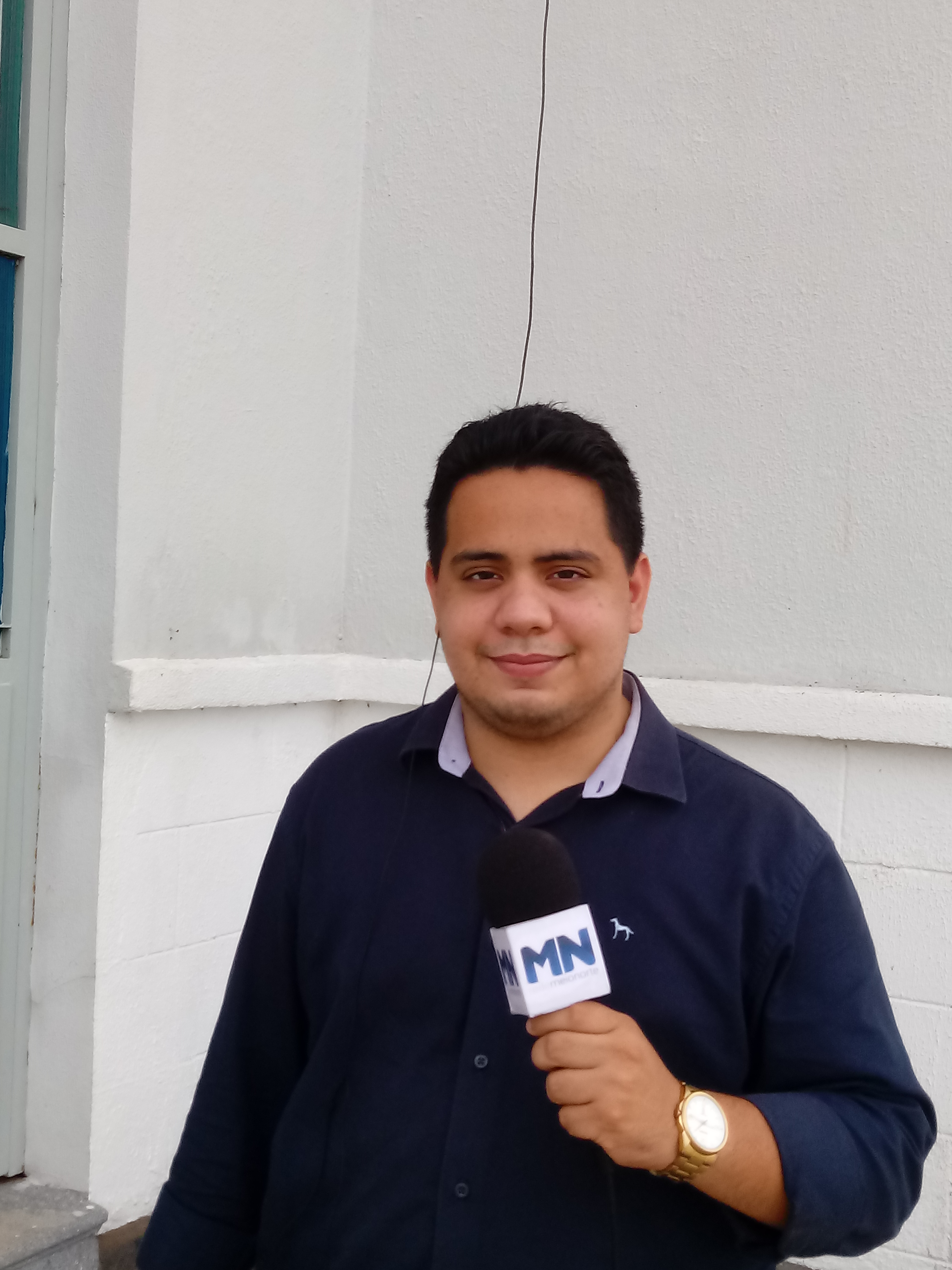
Helder Felipe, TV Meio Norte reported in Campo Maior.

On January 1, 2011, TV Meio Norte left Rede Bandeirantes after almost 11 years of affiliation and became an independent station, launching a new look and the slogan "A TV da nossa gente". Band lost its signal in the state until April 18, 2014, when it set up Band Piauí, an owned-and-operated station in the city of Teresina. As part of its launch schedule, the station covered live from Brasília the inauguration of the elected president Dilma Rousseff, in addition to interviewing politicians from Piauí and the then president of Venezuela, Hugo Chávez during the ceremony.

With its new line-up, TV Meio Norte became the flagship of Rede Meio Norte, a regional television network with plans to expand to all of the North and Northeast regions of Brazil. The first affiliate of the new network was TV Codó, whose broadcasts started on February 18. In Teresina, there was also the possibility of airing content in high definition and also 3D.

== Technical information ==
Virtual	Digital	Screen	Content
7.1	22 UHF	1080i	TV Meio's main schedule

The station started its digital broadcasts on August 11, 2011, through physical UHF channel 22 with the installation of a Harris transmitter. On January 17, 2012, the station started producing programming in high definition.

The station closed its analog signal on May 30, 2018, following the official ANATEL timeline. The person responsible for the procedure was the technical coordinator Raimundo Pereira, alias "o Português", an engineer who had also put the TV Timon signal on the air for the first time in 1985. unlike the other stations, Meio Norte shut down its analog signal at 12:24am on the early hours of May 31, after the repeat of 100 Milhas, returning minutes later with the MCTIC and ANATEL switch-off slide.
