= NordesTV =

NordesTV (ZYA 441)
- Sobral, Ceará; Brazil
- Channels: Digital: 39 (UHF); Virtual: 48
- Branding: NordesTV

Programming
- Affiliations: Independent

Ownership
- Owner: Jangadeiro; (TV Sobral Ltda.)
- Sister stations: TV Jangadeiro; Jangadeiro FM; Jangadeiro BandNews FM

History
- Founded: April 2, 2012
- Last air date: April 28, 2026
- Former channel numbers: 48 (analog, UHF, 2012–2018)
- Former affiliations: SBT (2012-2015); Band (2015-2020)

Technical information
- Licensing authority: ANATEL

Links
- Public license information: Profile

NordesTV was a Brazilian television station based in the city of Sobral, Ceará. It operates on channel 48 (virtual UHF 39) and is owned by the Jangadeiro media conglomerate.

== History ==
The concession to create the station was granted by the Ministry of Communications on June 13, 2008, to the Jangadeiro Communication System, in the city of Sobral, Ceará, and 66 days later, approved by the National Congress.

With the concession in hand, Sistema Jangadeiro de Comunicação begins negotiating the future affiliation of "TV Norte", as the station was known during its implementation phase. There was speculation that it could become a subsidiary of TV Jangadeiro de Fortaleza (also from the same group), and relay SBT programming to the interior of the state. In 2011, with the announcement that the broadcaster would return to the network of Rede Bandeirantes' affiliates, the group negotiated its affiliation with the channel with the São Paulo network.

At midnight on April 2, 2012, from the moment TV Jangadeiro starts retransmitting the Band's signal to the state of Ceará, it goes on air in Sobral, through channel 48 UHF and channel 13 of NET, NordesTV, as a new SBT affiliate, initially with a slide with the channel's logo and the audio of the network's programming, which broadcast Programa Silvio Santos. In the capital Fortaleza, the broadcaster's signal was provisionally displayed on channel 20 UHF, which before the change repeated Band Natal's signal, until the switch to channel 27 UHF on May 1, on a retransmitter whose concession belonged to SBT Brasília.

Although it went on air in April, the station's official inauguration took place just three months later, on July 5, during the 239th anniversary of the city of Sobral. The station's inauguration ceremony took place at the station's headquarters in the Center of Sobral, where Jangadeiro FM Sobral also operates, and was attended by several personalities, such as the president of the Jangadeiro Communication System, Tasso Jereissati and his wife Renata Queiroz Jereissati, the bishop of the Diocese of Sobral, Dom Odelir José Magri, the municipal secretary of Culture and Tourism, Antônio Campelo Costa, the president of the Chamber of Councilors, João Alberto Adeodato Júnior, the rector of the Vale do Acaraú State University, professor Antônio Colaço Martins, businessman Assis Machado, as well as directors from SBT and journalist Karyn Bravo. One day earlier, on July 4, the NordesTV branch was inaugurated in Fortaleza, which was in a container located in the parking lot of Shopping Pátio Cocó, in the Cocó neighborhood, in addition to the launch of the station's programming, which featured the presence of Marília Gabriela, Celso Portiolli, Karyn Bravo and Lola Melnick, representing the São Paulo broadcaster, and the singer Fagner who gave the musical presentation.

On March 12, 2013, a failure in Embratel's fiber optic cables that carry the broadcaster's signal from Sobral to Fortaleza caused the interruption of signal retransmission to the capital for two days. During this period, the NordesTV signal was temporarily replaced by SBT's satellite network transmission. In March 2015, the Fortaleza branch left the container facilities and began to have its own facility based on Avenida Santos Dumont, in the Aldeota neighborhood.

On July 10, 2015, the director of Sistema Jangadeiro de Comunicação, Cyro Thomaz, announced that as of August 1, NordesTV and TV Jangadeiro would switch affiliations, with NordesTV becoming affiliated with Rede Bandeirantes, and TV Jangadeiro returned to being affiliated with SBT after three years. On July 28, the digital signal of the station in Fortaleza, which was transmitted on channel 29 UHF (27.1 virtual), was relocated to channel 21 UHF (20.1 virtual), however, the analogue continued to be transmitted on 27 UHF until the day of the transition. On the same date, channel 20 UHF, which previously retransmitted Rede 21's programming, began temporarily retransmitting Rede Bandeirantes, also inserting a notice in the footer informing about the change.

After the end of Tela de Sucessos, around 1:10 am on August 1, the station displayed a slide informing the signal that it had been taken off the air for technical adjustments and informing viewers that SBT, in Fortaleza, would become rebroadcast on VHF channel 12. Shortly afterwards, the signal is taken off the air and channel 27 UHF is turned off. On channel 20 UHF in Fortaleza, the signal that temporarily retransmitted Rede Bandeirantes was taken off the air at 4:29 am and was replaced by colorbars. Two minutes later, the station's new institutional program is shown, on the new channel, and then cut to a program from the Universal Church of the Kingdom of God. The 27 UHF analog signal was turned back on, displaying a warning informing the station of the channel change, and is permanently deactivated the following day.

On October 8, 2018, the station's directors met with employees and announced the dismissal of around fifty professionals. In a note published by the Union of Journalists of Ceará (Sindjorce) and the National Federation of Journalists (FENAJ), the Jangadeiro System's decision is due to the discontinuity of the transfer of resources from the Band to the affiliate, a situation that had been happening since 2016. It was It was also announced that the broadcaster would end its activities in Fortaleza, with the expectation of operating its programming only in Sobral. With the premiere of Todo Dia on TV, in May 2019, local programming in Fortaleza began to be produced at the headquarters of Sistema Jangadeiro.

In 2020, Sistema Jangadeiro decided not to renew NordesTV's affiliation with Rede Bandeirantes, and on May 27, it was announced by Grupo Bandeirantes de Comunicação that TV Bandeirantes Ceará, its own broadcaster, would be launched on June 1. occupied the Fortaleza channel and which would have as its generator channel 27 UHF in São José de Ribamar, in Maranhão, which was used by Band Maranhão. On the 29th, NordesTV, through its social networks, announced that it would permanently close its operations.

In the early hours of May 31 to June 1, while showing Band's programming, the broadcaster's channel in Sobral started to retransmit TV Jangadeiro's programming. In Fortaleza, Band Ceará went on air at around 1:15 am, after channel 21D UHF went offline.

On April 4, 2024, the station returned to the air on its original frequency on channels 27.1 in Fortaleza and 48.1 in Sobral, but still in the testing phase, retransmitting the programs Brasil Agora and Poder Expresso on the SBT News channel, an online news channel linked to SBT. NordesTV also intends to air more of the network's programs under a sublicensing agreement.

In August 2025, the broadcaster will resume producing its own programming, including the return of the *NordesTV Notícias* newscast and the variety show "Todo Dia Sobral", as well as reruns of programs from TV Jangadeiro.

On April 28, 2026, NordesTV's signal in Sobral was transferred to Band Ceará, which previously lacked coverage in the state's northern region. The channel's arrival in the area was officially announced on May 1. With the change, the Fortaleza relay station went off the air.
