= Record Manaus =

- Manaus, Amazonas; Brazil
- Channels: Digital: 14 (UHF); Virtual: 15

Programming
- Affiliations: Record

Ownership
- Owner: Grupo Record; (Rádio e Televisão Record S.A.)

History
- First air date: June 17, 2019
- Former names: RecordTV Manaus (2019–2023)
- Former channel numbers: Digital: 36 (UHF, 2019–2024)

Technical information
- Licensing authority: ANATEL
- ERP: 2.6 kW
- Transmitter coordinates: 3°5′39.2″S 59°59′27.2″W

Links
- Public license information: Profile
- Website: record.r7.com/record-emissoras/norte/record-manaus/

Record Manaus (channel 14) is a Record-owned-and-operated station licensed to Manaus, capital of the state of Amazonas. It was created by the network to restore its affiliation in the city, whose affiliate, TV A Crítica, was about to drop the network due to disagreements and the removal of network programming. Its studios are located on the 12th floor of The Office Building, in the Adrianópolis neighborhood, and its transmitters are in the Aleixo neighborhood.

== History ==
=== Prior Record affiliates in Manaus ===
Record, when it was part of Rede de Emissoras Independentes, had some of its programs broadcast in Amazonas between the 1960s and 1980s, through partnerships with TV Ajuricaba and TV Baré (currently TV A Crítica). After establishing itself as a television network in 1990, Record gained its first affiliate in Manaus in 1992, with the opening of TV Manaus (currently TV Norte Amazonas). The end of the affiliation occurred in 2007, after the network's dissatisfaction with the station, signing an agreement with TV A Crítica. In recent years as an affiliate, TV A Crítica saw its results grow with investment in local production, including partnerships with international producers and broadcasting of regional events.

=== Record’s break-up with TV A Crítica and preparations ===
On May 10, 2019, TV A Crítica chose to end its affiliation with Record effective June, after two years of negotiating with the network. According to the station's president, Dissica Calderaro, the partnership with Record did not leave local TV comfortable expanding its focus on the state and therefore would continue with independent programming. The press reported that Record considered TV A Crítica "insubordinate" due to the international contracts signed for local production and the cut of national programs, such as Cidade Alerta. Subsequently, Grupo Record announced the launch of RecordTV Manaus, a new branch of the network in the North of the country, for June 17, 2019. The channel chosen to transmit the network, 35 UHF, was an original grant from Record News and was under the administration of Rede Diário de Comunicação, which had operated TV Diário, affiliated with the network, since its debut. As it is in the Legal Amazon, it was decided to use the concession as a generator, even though it was granted as a relay.

Throughout the month of May, Record made several investments for the new branch, estimated at R$20 million. Around 200 professionals were hired and the entire structure was assembled in a record time of 36 days. The future station rented a floor of The Office Building in Adrianópolis, where its headquarters were set up, and leased an old radiating system belonging to businessman Nilton Lins Júnior, which served as an Ideal TV retransmitter. Journalist Thiago Feitosa was responsible for implementing local journalism, and for the presentation of future news programs, Fabíola Gadelha (who had her career peak as a reporter on TV A Crítica) was transferred from São Paulo to Manaus and also Clayton Pascarelli and his team were hired, until then in charge of Alô Amazonas on TV A Crítica. To make viewers in Manaus aware of the change of affiliation, RecordTV began releasing announcements during breaks in national programming to tune in to channel 36.1, in addition to showing articles on its main programs.

=== Launch ===
The change of affiliation and consequent opening of RecordTV Manaus was scheduled for June 17, 2019, when TV A Crítica would end its affiliation and become an independent station. However, to the surprise of viewers, the membership was abruptly terminated at midnight on June 3, two weeks ahead of schedule. Record was off the air in Manaus and nearby areas for three days, having hastily activated its signal on June 6, when it began provisionally broadcasting network programming in place of TV Diário (relocated to channel 27 UHF on June 15).

On the scheduled date, an inauguration ceremony was held in the presence of the president of RecordTV, Luiz Cláudio Costa, and the governor of Amazonas, Wilson Lima. At 11am local time, RecordTV Manaus debuted its local programming with Balanço Geral Manaus, presented by Fabíola Gadelha, and during the night, it was the turn of the newscast Amazonas Record, under the command of Clayton Pascarelli. On national television, Record's 15th O&O was presented to viewers during Jornal da Record, which featured anchor Adriana Araújo live from Manaus, in front of Teatro Amazonas.

=== Later developments ===
On October 30, Fabíola Gadelha left the presentation of Balanço Geral Manaus, returning to Record's headquarters in São Paulo, where she started doing special reports for the network's news programs. With that, Clayton Pascarelli, who already presented the Saturday editions, became its presenter, leaving Amazonas Record. In her place, journalist Natália Teodoro took over, coming from Rede Amazônica, from November 11.

On December 1, 2021, Clayton Pascarelli was fired by Record, according to him, under the allegation that he was no longer in the channel's profile. In his place, Paulo Carneiro, coming from TV Jovem, took command of Balanço Geral. On November 6, following the rebranding of the network, which was once again called Record, RecordTV Manaus was renamed Record Manaus.

On October 22, 2024, seeking to get closer to the channels with the highest audience in the capital of Amazonas, Record Manaus began operating on channel 14 UHF (virtual 15.1).
