= BandNews FM Fortaleza =

Jangadeiro BandNews FM (ZYC 412)
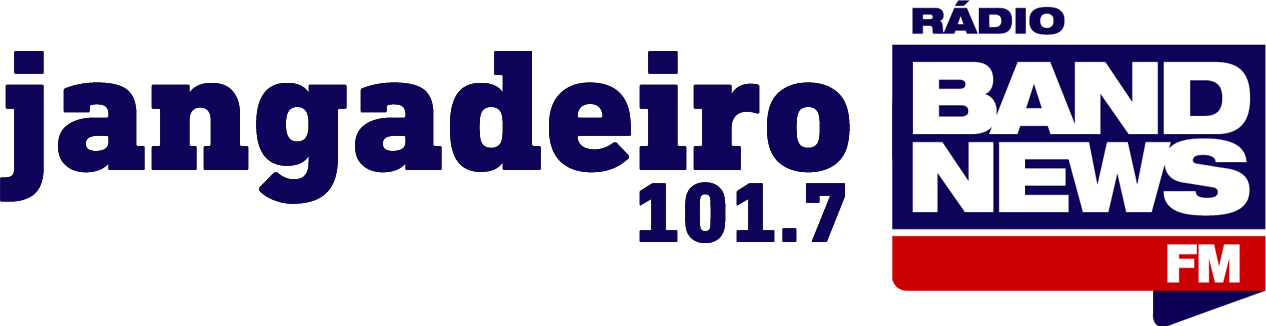

Fortaleza, Ceará; Brazil
- Frequency: 101.7 MHz

Programming
- Language: Portuguese
- Format: All news
- Affiliations: BandNews FM

Ownership
- Owner: Rádio FM Casablanca Ltda.
- Operator: Sistema Jangadeiro de Comunicação
- Sister stations: Jangadeiro FM; TV Jangadeiro

History
- First air date: March 11, 2013
- Former names: Tribuna BandNews FM

Technical information
- Licensing authority: ANATEL
- Class: A2
- Power: 30 kW

Links
- Public license information: Profile

Jangadeiro BandNews FM (ZYC 412) is a radio station licensed to Fortaleza, Ceará, serving the respective metropolitan area. It is part of the pool of enterprises called Sistema Jangadeiro de Comunicação and operates in the all news format, having been affiliated to BandNews FM since its foundation in 2013.

== History ==
The first logo used by the radio station, when it was called Tribuna BandNews FM.

At the end of 2012, it was reported after confirmation from Grupo Bandeirantes de Comunicação that Fortaleza would have a station from the BandNews FM all news network. The new station would occupy the 101.7 MHz frequency, which had been broadcast by Beach Park FM since 2011 and was negotiated between the latter and Sistema Jangadeiro de Comunicação. The preparations for the inauguration were reported on national television by BandNews FM journalist Eduardo Barão directly from the capital of Ceará. Tribuna BandNews FM went on the air at 7:30 a.m. on March 11, 2013, and Beach Park FM briefly went online. The launch of the station was attended by Barão, Ricardo Boechat, also a journalist with the network, and executives from the Grupo Bandeirantes. The name was a reference to the Tribuna do Ceará portal, launched at the same time, which for years had been the title of a newspaper in Fortaleza and had the rights acquired by Tasso Jereissati, owner of the Sistema Jangadeiro. The station was the first affiliate of BandNews FM, which until then only had its own stations, launched as a result of a previous change of affiliation of TV Jangadeiro, which became a Band affiliate in 2012.

In its early days, based on the time slots allocated by BandNews FM to local programming, Tribuna BandNews FM's daily schedule consisted of Edição Manhã, Primeira Edição and Edição Noite. On January 5, 2014, the station started to have a sports team to broadcast matches of Ceará soccer teams, with Quixadá and Fortaleza, valid for the Campeonato Cearense, as the first broadcast of the new team. In 2018, the station and TV Jangadeiro launched the sports program Futebolês, a multimedia project created after the acquisition of the rights to broadcast the Copa do Nordeste. In 2019, Rede Jangadeiro FM stations in the interior of Ceará stopped broadcasting part of Tribuna BandNews FM's programming due to a crisis faced by the Sistema Jangadeiro.

On August 10, 2020, during the reformulation of the Sistema Jangadeiro vehicles, the station changed its name to Jangadeiro BandNews FM. The names of its news programs, broadcast in the morning in two editions from Monday to Friday and one on Saturday, were also changed to Jornal Jangadeiro.

== Programs and communicators ==
- Jornal Jangadeiro 1.ª Edição (Lucas Leite)
- Jornal Jangadeiro 2.ª Edição (Nonato Albuquerque and Iury Costa)
- Futebolês (Jussie Cunha and Caio Costa)
- Inovação e Negócios (Daniel Demétrio)

=== Sports team ===
- Jussiê Cunha and Eudes Viana, narrators;
- Caio Costa, Renato Manso and Eduardo Trovão, commentators;
- Danilo Queiroz (Ceará) and Anderson Azevedo (Fortaleza), reporters;
- Flávia Gouveia and Gustavo Gadelha, on-call.
