= Band Tocantins =

TV Bandeirantes Tocantins
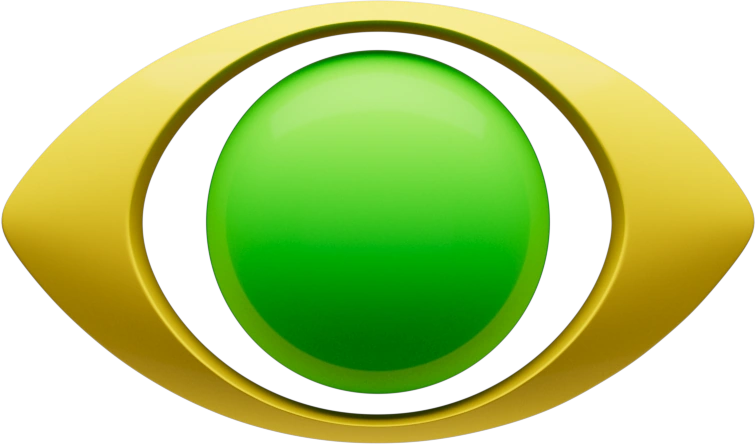
- Palmas, Tocantins; Brazil
- Channels: Digital: 35 (UHF); Virtual: 4
- Branding: Band Tocantins

Programming
- Affiliations: Rede Bandeirantes

Ownership
- Owner: Grupo Bandeirantes de Comunicação; (Rádio e Televisão Bandeirantes Ltda.)

History
- First air date: October 22, 2008
- Former channel numbers: Analog: 4 (VHF, 2008-2018)

Technical information
- Licensing authority: ANATEL

Links
- Website: band.com.br/tv/tocantins

Band Tocantins (channel 4) is a Band-owned-and-operated station licensed to Palmas, capital of the state of Tocantins. Its offices are located on Quadra 102 Norte.

== History ==
Before establishing an O&O in Tocantins, Band was relayed by TV Palmas (1990-1992) and TV Javaés (1992-1997), as well as a relay station of TV Girassol (1997-2008).

After the third station ceased relaying its signal to Palmas in February 2008, Grupo Bandeirantes began to bid for an O&O license in the city, as no stations were willing to carry the network. Bandeirantes' bid won the Ministry of Communications bid and was granted channel 4 for a future station as if it were a TV relay station (RTV). By being in Legal Amazon, the station could be used as a generator, a decision taken by the conglomerate.

The station launched on October 22, 2008, only inserting station IDs and local commercials, beginning to have local programs only in 2009.

On December 23, 2008, ANATEL approved the definitive use of the station. On May 14, 2015, Grupo Bandeirantes de Comunicação, which promoted a series of cost-cutting measures due to its financial situation, decided to end the station's local programming, firing 10 staff and closing its facilities at Edifício Comercial Amazônia Center, in Quadra 501 Sul, where the station had been located since its launch. Its signal was replaced by a direct feed of Band São Paulo, without the insertion of local commercials, resuming its activities on April 29, 2019, only airing local commercials.

== Technical information ==
Virtual channel	Digital channel	Screen	Content
4.1	35 UHF	1080i	Band Tocantins/Band's main schedule
