= Torre da TV Bandeirantes =

Maria Helena Mendes de Barros Saad Tower
- Torre Maria Helena Mendes de Barros Saad
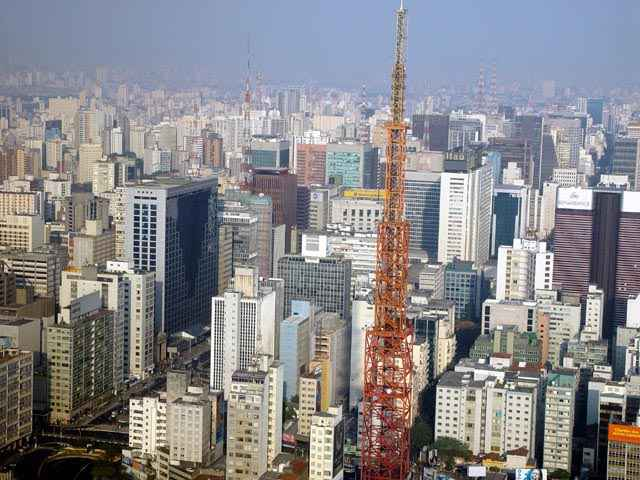
- Interactive map of Maria Helena Mendes de Barros Saad Tower
- Location: Rua Minas Gerais, 454; São Paulo, Brazil
- Coordinates: 23°33′20″S 46°39′56″W
- Height: 212 m (696 ft)
- Beginning date: 1992
- Completion date: 1995

The Maria Helena Mendes de Barros Saad Tower, more commonly known as Torre da TV Bandeirantes, or Torre da Band, is a television and radio lattice tower located in the district of Consolação, near the Avenida Paulista in São Paulo, Brazil. Owned by the Brazilian media company Grupo Bandeirantes de Comunicação, the tower is 212 m (696 ft) high, making it the tallest tower in São Paulo and one of the tallest towers in Latin America. Its name is in honor of the wife of the founder of Rede Bandeirantes, João Saad.

== History ==
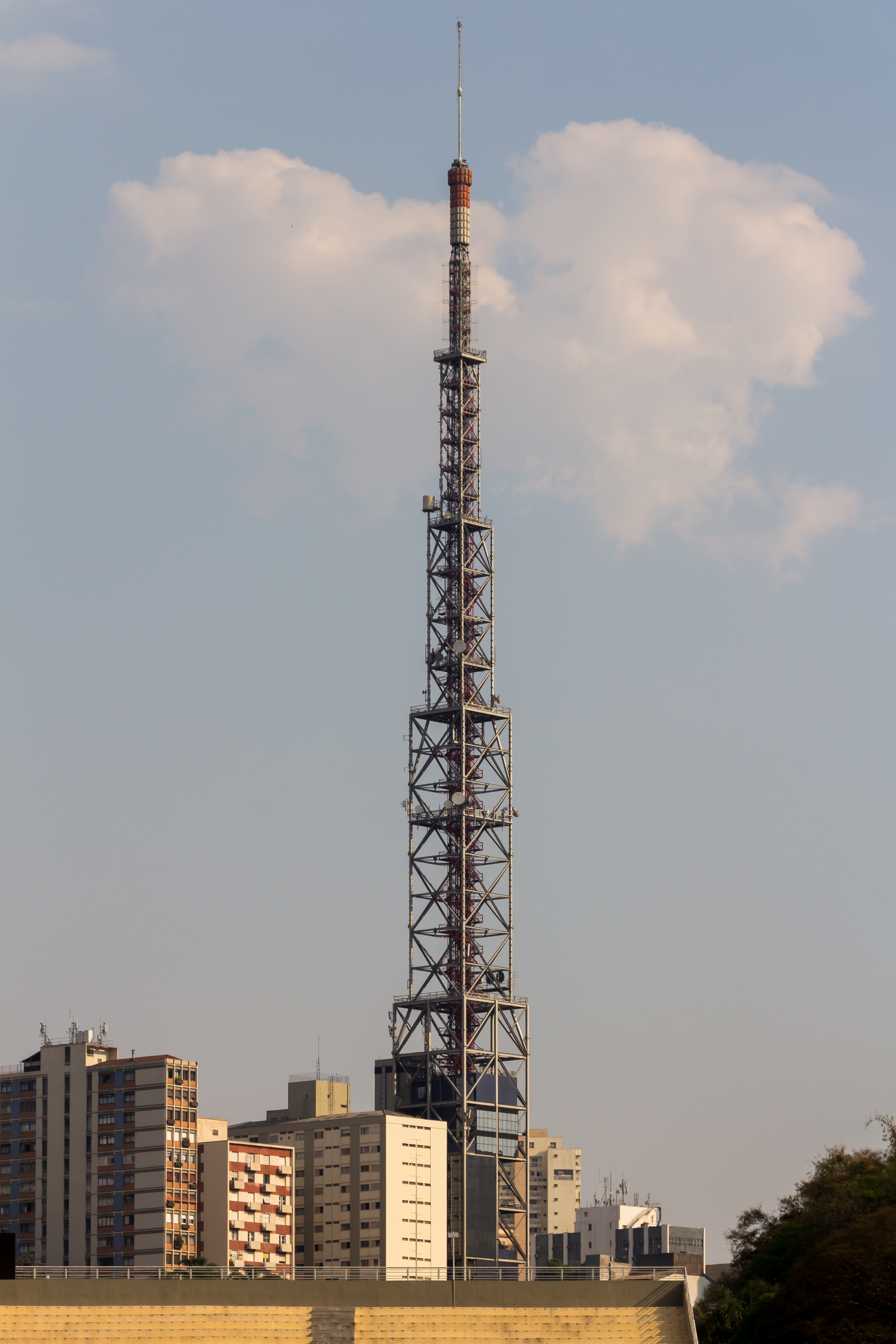
Seen from Pacaembu Stadium in 2017

The tower is privately owned by Brazilian television network Rede Bandeirantes and the tower is not accessible to the public. It was completed in 1997 replacing the old transmitters of TV Bandeirantes São Paulo and Band FM in Pico do Jaraguá. 650 tons of steel were used in the construction of the tower. The tower is one of the tallest freestanding towers in Latin America and the tower is among the tallest structures in South America.

The tower used yellow lighting until June 2011 when it was replaced by a new lighting system using nearly 30,000 LED lamps designed by Peter Gasper and Fabio Ribeiro. The inauguration of the new lighting system was shown live by Rede Bandeirantes, through the special Band Ilumina a Cidade. The lighting system has since been switched off to save on electrical costs. At the end of 2019, BandNews FM São Paulo moved its broadcasting system to the tower, replacing the old one that was at Edifício Paulista I, on Avenida Paulista.

The Bandeirantes Tower was the tallest structure in São Paulo until 2006, when a TV tower for Rede Globo was built on top of Alameda Santos, 680.

== Tower tenants ==
=== Television ===
| Channel | Analog/Digital | Broadcast station | In service |
|---|---|---|---|
| VHF 13 | Analog | Band São Paulo | 1996–2017 |
| UHF 21 | Analog | Rede 21 | 1996–2017 |
| UHF 23 | Digital | Band São Paulo | 2007–present |
| UHF 22 | Digital | Rede 21 | 2007–present |
| UHF 49 | Digital | Terra Viva | 2016–2017 |
| UHF 21 | Digital | Terra Viva | 2017–present |

=== Radio ===
| Frequency | Broadcast station | In service |
|---|---|---|
| FM 96.1 MHz | Band FM | 1996–present |
| FM 96.9 MHz | BandNews FM | 2019–present |
