= Band Mais =

TV Bandeirantes Mais (ZYQ 834)
Campinas, São Paulo; Brazil
- Channels: Digital: 16 (UHF); Virtual: 4
- Branding: Band Mais

Programming
- Affiliations: Rede Bandeirantes

Ownership
- Owner: Grupo Bandeirantes de Comunicação; (Rádio e TV Bandeirantes de Campinas Ltda.)

History
- First air date: 1990
- Former call signs: ZYB 889 (1990–2019)
- Former names: TV Bandeirantes Campinas (1990–2019)
- Former channel numbers: Analog: 15 (UHF, 1990–2018)

Technical information
- Licensing authority: ANATEL
- ERP: 10 kW
- Transmitter coordinates: 22°56′28.8″S 47°1′56.5″W

Links
- Public license information: Profile
- Website: bandmulti.com.br

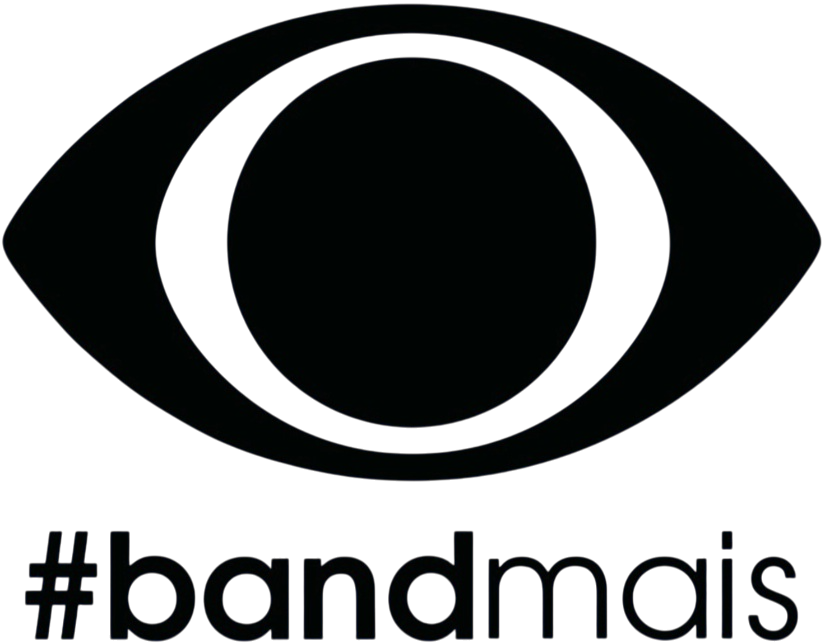
Band Mais logo

Band Mais (channel 4) is a Rede Bandeirantes-owned-and-operated station licensed to Campinas, São Paulo, Brazil, founded in 1990 as TV Bandeirantes Campinas. Originally a relay station, it became an originating broadcaster with locally produced programming, expanded its operations with modern studios in the 1990s and 2000s, rebranded as Band Mais in 2019 to reflect its wider regional coverage, and currently broadcasts digitally on UHF channel 16 (virtual 4.1) after shutting down its analog signal in 2018.

== History ==
Grupo Bandeirantes de Comunicação was active in Campinas since the 1950s, when Rádio Educadora (now Rádio Bandeirantes Campinas) was acquired João Jorge Saad. In 1975, TV Bandeirantes São Paulo, in the process of becoming a national network, implements a relay station in the municipality, until 1990 when it became an originating station TV Bandeirantes Campinas, on UHF channel 15.

Initially, the station relayed the entirety of Band's schedule and only inserted local commercials. It wasn't until July 1993 when the first local programs were produced, in partnership with production company Telecine, and due to the lack of technical conditions, they were all pre-recorded. In the mid-90s, the partnership is broken and Band Campinas started producing its programs by itself, after building new studios in the Castelo neighborhood, where its commercial department and offices have been operational since 1990.

In 2003, Complexo João Jorge Saad was inaugurated in the Jardim São Gabriel neighborhood, gathering the station and the radio outlets owned by Grupo Bandeirantes in Campinas in the same location, and with that, Band Campinas began producing its local programs live.

On September 1, 2019, Band Campinas was renamed Band Mais, which, according to its directors, represents its coverage beying Campinas, in over 60 cities of the inland region of the state of São Paulo.

== Digital television ==
Channel	Video	Aspect	Programming
4.1	16 UHF	1080i	Main Band Mais programming / Rede Bandeirantes

The station shut down its analog signal on UHF channel 15 on January 17, 2018, according to the official ANATEL roadmap.
