= Jangadeiro FM =

Jangadeiro FM (ZYC 417)
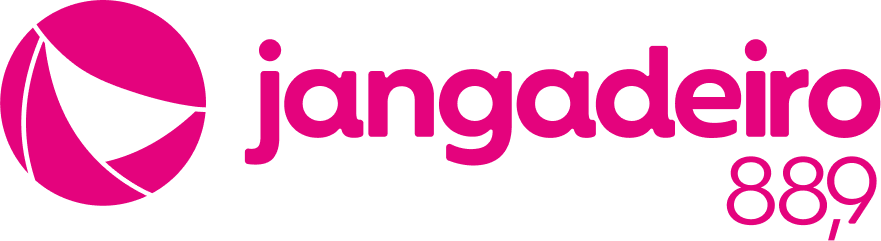

Fortaleza, Ceará; Brazil
- Frequency: 88.9 MHz

Programming
- Language: Portuguese
- Format: Music

Ownership
- Owner: FM Jangadeiro Ltda.
- Operator: Jangadeiro
- Sister stations: Jangadeiro BandNews FM; TV Jangadeiro; NordesTV

History
- First air date: March 10, 1990

Technical information
- Licensing authority: ANATEL
- Class: A1
- Power: 58,7 kW

Links
- Public license information: Profile
- Website: jangadeirofm.com.br

Jangadeiro FM (ZYC 417) is a radio station licensed to Fortaleza, Ceará, serving the respective metropolitan area and its state radio network currently consisting of 7 stations. It is part of the pool of enterprises named Sistema Jangadeiro de Comunicação. The station is a music radio station with a regional format, being the audience leader in its segment.

== History ==
In the early 1990s, at the height of FM radio's popularity in Fortaleza, the then governor of the state of Ceará, Tasso Jereissati, received a concession to operate a radio station on 88.9 MHz. At the time, the concession was being disputed by the group led by businessman Assis Machado and the owners of the newspaper O Povo, the latter with new projects for FM radio. However, the loss of the lawsuits caused the group to withdraw.

Jangadeiro FM was launched on March 10, 1990, together with TV Jangadeiro. Both companies had a popular focus and the radio station invested in musical styles such as forró, pagode and songs from the 1980s. Seeking to differentiate itself from other stations in the capital, the station sought professionals from other states, such as Bahia and Rio de Janeiro. The station quickly became popular, achieving second place in the first few years, but did not maintain this position in the following years. Later, it began to establish a network of radio stations in the interior of Ceará, expanding throughout the state from 2013 onwards.

In 2012, the station began investing in its structure to become the leader among the stations in Fortaleza. That year, the station ranked between second and third among the most listened to radio stations, according to Ibope data. Its average audience was 113,000 listeners per minute. Later, it invested in hiring professionals and holding prize draws for listeners.

In February 2017, the station released a survey in which it appeared, for the first time, as the leader among the most listened to radio stations in Fortaleza, thus beating the then leader FM 93.

== Stations ==
Call sign	Frequency	City of license	First air date
ZYS 810	100.1 FM	Limoeiro do Norte	—
ZYV 342	103.1 FM	Iguatu	May 16, 2014
ZYV 343	92.1 FM	Crateús	March 31, 2014
ZYV 346	98.9 FM	Quixeramobim	March 31, 2014
ZYV 398	92.7 FM	Barbalha	—
ZYV 694	99.7 FM	Sobral	—
ZYV 765	97.5 FM	Crato	—

=== Former stations ===
- Jangadeiro FM Brejo Santo
- Jangadeiro FM Camocim
- Jangadeiro FM Quixadá

== Bibliography ==
- Canalito, Jorge; Leme, Paulinho (2007). Rádio FM: Em Fortaleza é outra história. Fortaleza, Ceará: Premius Editora. ISBN 9788590732907.
