= TV Norte Acre =

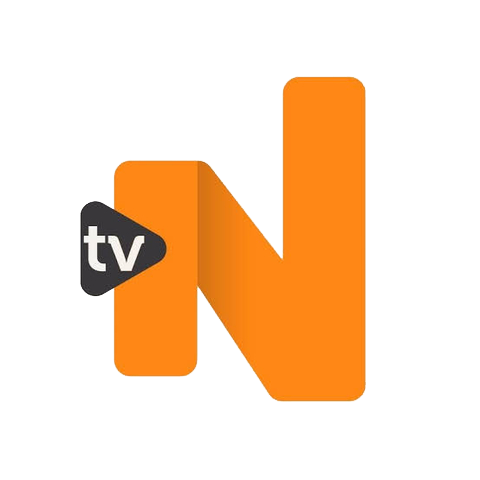

Rio Branco, Acre; Brazil
- Channels: Digital: 22 (UHF); Virtual: 22

Programming
- Affiliations: SBT

Ownership
- Owner: Grupo Norte de Comunicação; (Sinal Brasileiro de Comunicação Ltda.)

History
- First air date: March 28, 2020

Technical information
- Licensing authority: ANATEL
- ERP: 2.5 kW

Links
- Public license information: Profile
- Website: portalnortedenoticias.com.br

TV Norte Acre (channel 22) is an SBT-affiliated station licensed to Rio Branco, capital of the state of Acre. The station is owned by Grupo Norte de Comunicação, a regional media conglomerate, owned by businessman Sérgio Bringel.

== History ==
=== Background ===
The license which later gave birth to TV Norte Acre was granted to president Luiz Inácio Lula da Silva on November 19, 2009, originally for analog UHF channel 21, after a public competition won by Grupo Rasera, responsible for controlling several other television and radio concessions across the country. Channel 21 was initially leased to the Igreja Assembleia de Deus em Rio Branco (IEADERB), being used to transmit programming from Rede Mundial between 2012 and 2018, and later, from Rede Super.

With the shutdown of the analog signal on October 31, 2018, the station began operating on digital UHF channel 22, which had been granted by the Ministry of Communications on December 18, 2015. In 2019, the newly launched ABC TV, owned by Sistema Acre Brasil de Comunicação, exchanged frequencies with Rede Super, moving to channel 44.

=== Implementation and problems with TV Rio Branco ===
In the second half of 2020, Grupo Norte de Comunicação, which controlled the SBT affiliates in Manaus and Palmas, purchased the facilities and concession of ABC TV (which migrated to channel 42 UHF on September 30), with the aim of establishing a new affiliate of the network in Rio Branco. At the same time, the group activated official profiles on Twitter, Facebook and Instagram with publications that created expectations for the future TV Norte Acre in the subsequent months, and on May 15, 2021, channel 22 UHF began carrying out experimental broadcasts.

However, SBT was already relayed locally through TV Rio Branco (channel 8), which was its partner since its launch in 1989. On October 21 of the same year, during an interview for the podcast Papo Informal, and on the verge of losing his station's affiliation, businessman Narciso Mendes de Assis threatened to take legal action against Sérgio Bringel, owner of Grupo Norte de Comunicação, claiming to have evidence that he and his companies were involved in a "powerful scheme" to monopolize communications in the North of the country. Both Grupo Norte and SBT refuted the statements, with the network releasing a statement stating that the affiliation contract with TV Rio Branco had been terminated due to problems with the affiliate, "with full legal and legal support", and that "Grupo Norte bought the affiliates in Manaus and Palmas and invested a lot in them, resolving the problems of these partners and transforming them into excellent stations".

The imbroglio between the two ended up delaying the implementation of TV Norte Acre, scheduled for November 2021, and dragged on until March 2022, when TV Rio Branco signed an affiliation contract with TV Cultura, leaving the way clear for the broadcaster to take over the SBT signal. TV Norte Acre began its definitive transmissions at midnight (local time, 2am in Brasília) on March 28, 2022, at the same time that TV Rio Branco started transmitting the signal from its new network. The first program seen was an episode of Lassie, which, at first, for around 30 minutes, only had its audio played over color bars, due to a technical problem.

The station premiered its local programming on January 16, 2023, with Agora Acre and Norte Notícias Acre, presented by journalist Efraim Macambira, following the standards of TV Norte's local programming throughout the region. On April 8, it started airing Inspiração Gourmet, presented by chef Deocleciano Brito.
