= TV A Crítica =

TV A Crítica (ZYA 246)
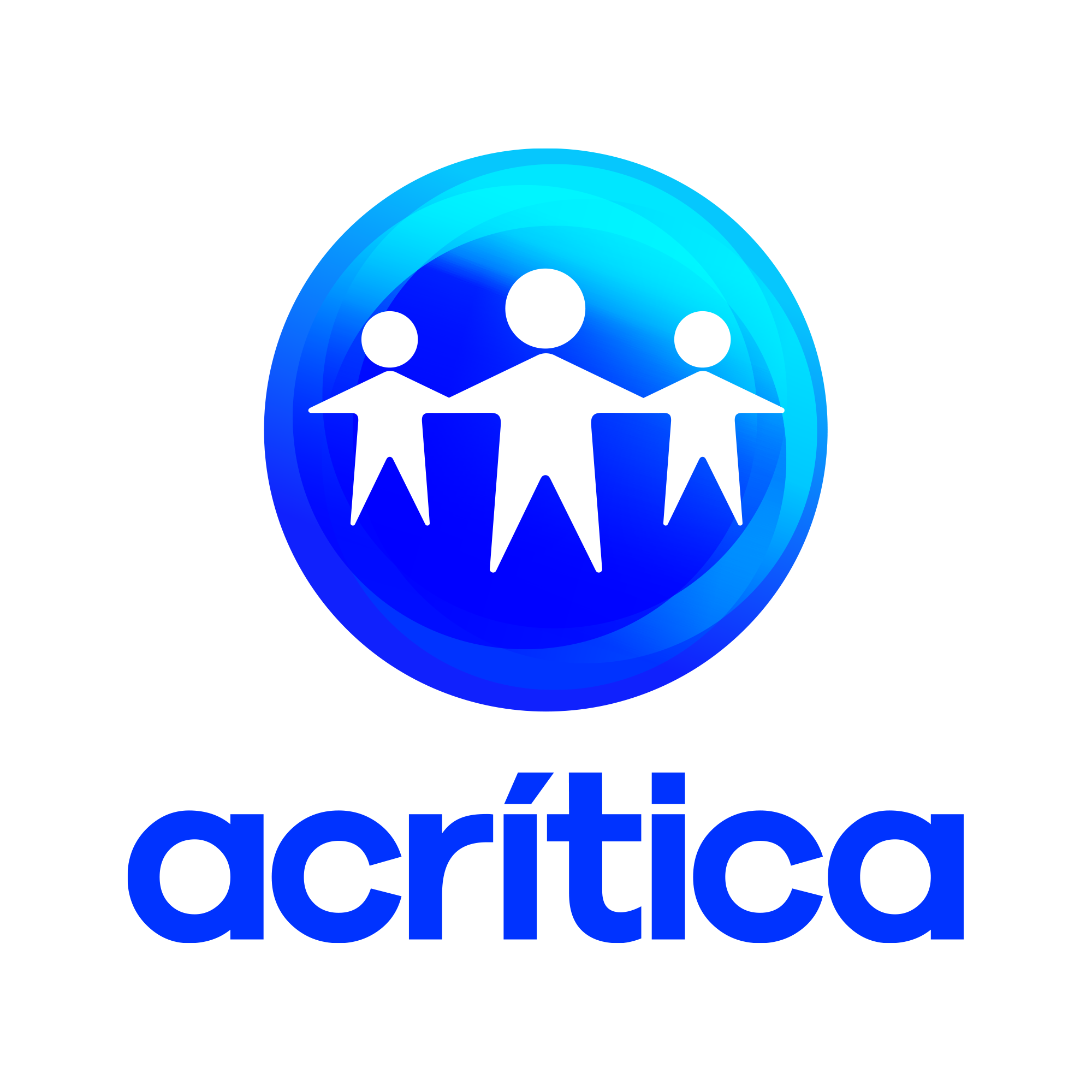
- Manaus, Amazonas; Brazil
- Channels: Digital: 17 (UHF); Virtual: 4

Programming
- Affiliations: Independent

Ownership
- Owner: Rede Calderaro de Comunicação; (Televisão A Crítica Limitada)
- Sister stations: Inova TV; FM O Dia Manaus

History
- First air date: June 2, 1972
- Former names: TV Baré (1972-1986)
- Former channel numbers: Analog: 4 (VHF, 1972–2017)
- Former affiliations: Rede Tupi (1972–1980); TVS-Record (1980–1981); SBT (1981–2007); RecordTV (2007-2019)

Technical information
- Licensing authority: ANATEL
- Transmitter coordinates: 3°05′52.8″S 59°59′33.5″W

Links
- Public license information: Profile
- Website: acritica.com

TV A Crítica (channel 4) is a Brazilian television network based in Manaus, capital of the state of Amazonas. The station is the flagship broadcast property of the locally based Rede Calderaro de Comunicação, which also includes the newspapers A Crítica and Manaus Hoje, the FM radio stations O Dia Manaus and Jovem Pan FM Manaus, sister station Inova TV, among other outlets. Since its independence from the Record network, it has temporarily broadcast content from RedeTV!.

== History ==
=== Beginnings with Tupi ===
In 1968, the federal government launched a competition for a second television channel in Manaus. At the time, TV Ajuricaba had been on the air since 1967, through UHF channel 38. However, some homes already had television sets (around 2,000 televisions for a population of 300,000 inhabitants in Manaus), which at the time received signals from relay stations of Radio Caracas Televisión from Venezuela in a very precarious way, as it was noisy and had a bad image.

The Diários Associados group won the competition and obtained the concession in 1968. To put the station on the air, a company was formed with 30 partners (among them, businessman Umberto Calderaro Filho, owner of the newspaper A Crítica), with each of the shares, all linked to Diários Associados, including journalist Alfredo Sade (died in 1971).

After signal, sound and equipment tests, TV Baré went on air on June 2, 1972, broadcasting the opening ceremony directly from Palácio Rio Negro, with a speech by the then governor of Amazonas João Andrade where at the end he said: "From this moment on, I authorize the beginning of the operation and activities of Rádio e Televisão Baré, channel 4 of Manaus", followed by images of the Curumim Indian (former logo of Rede Tupi) with the phrase "On Air, the Pioneer in Image-Sound, Reach and Color!" – this slogan being used as an advertisement for future color broadcasts, borrowed from its stations in the southeast. The newly founded station becomes an affiliate of Rede Tupi; replacing TV Ajuricaba which consequently became an affiliate of REI.

Initially, the transmission of Tupi's programming was done via tapes and films sent from São Paulo, causing a considerable delay for weeks in showing the programming (telenovelas, soccer matches and other events) in relation to São Paulo. Therefore, it expanded local programming.

Between 1974 and 1976, TV Baré also started to show programs produced by REI, after TV Ajuricaba, its former partner, started to retransmit Rede Globo's programming in full. During this period, it remained the audience leader in the state of Amazonas, gradually losing its audience as Tupi worsened its financial-administrative crisis.

=== Transition to SBT ===
With the bankruptcy of Rede Tupi in 1980, TV Baré began to air its programming independently, until it became affiliated with SBT in 1981. The station's company was made up of 30 shareholders, who later sold their shares to the businessman and journalist Umberto Calderaro Filho, owner of the newspaper A Crítica, when a financial-administrative crisis hit Diários Associados. The journalist took control of the station in 1986, and in that year, TV Baré changed its name to TV A Crítica, whose name was taken from the flagship newspaper of the Rede Calderaro de Comunicação company.

On September 30, 2006, the day before the day of the Brazilian federal and state elections, a justice officer from the Regional Electoral Court of Amazonas (TRE-AM) was sent to the headquarters of TV A Crítica in Manaus to seal the transmitters to suspend transmissions in Manaus and the entire Amazon for 24 hours by order of judge Encarnação Graça Sampaio of the Electoral Court. The reason was that the station tried to associate candidate Eduardo Braga with administrative scandals during a debate between candidates for governor of the state (mediated by SBT journalist, Hermano Henning), in which neither Braga nor Amazonino Mendes were present during the debate, which led to request from Governor Braga's coalition to join the TRE against the station, which was off the air for almost 24 hours, which almost hampered election coverage. Governor Eduardo Braga was re-elected on October 1.

=== Switch to Record ===
In the first months of 2007, TV A Crítica showed interest in wanting to leave SBT, due to the sudden changes in programming ordered by Sílvio Santos from 2001 onwards, which were strongly opposed by the station's management.

On July 5, representatives from TV A Crítica sign an agreement with those from Rede Record, and became the latter's affiliate September 1.

At the end of October, speculation arose that TV A Crítica wants to re-affiliate with SBT due to the drop in audience suffered in the first months after affiliating with Record, thus losing second place in audience ratings in the capital to now recently named TV Em Tempo (formerly TV Manaus), so that the former affiliate would return to Record.

On August 10, 2009, TV A Critica launched its digital signal and became the first Record affiliate in the North Region to broadcast digitally, transmitting to more than 2 million viewers in Manaus and adjacent municipalities, through UHF channel 17.

On August 13, 2009, the Manicoré relay, in the interior of Amazonas, was the target of an attack, which was not investigated by the authorities.

=== End of Record affiliation in 2019 and independent status ===
After two years operating in negotiations with Record, in which they broadcast the network without a contract, TV A Crítica announced on May 10, 2019, that it chose to end its affiliation with the network. According to the station's president, Dissica Calderaro, the partnership with Record did not leave local TV comfortable with expanding its focus on the state and so they would continue with independent programming. The fact that the station invested in international contracts to strengthen the local schedule would have weighed heavily on Record, in addition to the refusal to follow the network's programming standard and the cutting of national programs, such as Cidade Alerta, being classified as "insubordinate" by the network's directors.

Initially, it was planned that TV A Crítica would leave Record on June 17, when the network would launch its owned-and-operated station, RecordTV Manaus, to replace the affiliation. However, the station anticipated its shutdown by two weeks on its own, and at midnight on June 3, while an episode of CSI: Crime Scene Investigation was being shown (which was not completed), TV A Crítica interrupted the program and showed a five-minute video, telling part of its 47-year history (completed the day before) and its plans to become an independent station, abruptly ending its affiliation with Record after 11 years and 9 months. Then, instead of the UCKG programming shown in the early hours of the morning, the station continued with the airing of promos for the new programming and videos with songs from the Parintins Folklore Festival, which would be held in the same month.

== Centers and affiliates ==
TV A Crítica has six owned-and-operated stations and 13 affiliated stations since the station became independent.

Manaus (Amazonas) - Channel 4 - Since 1972

Belo Horizonte (Minas Gerais) - Channel 31 - Since 2021

Recife (Pernambuco) - Channel 48 - Since 2021

Brasília (Distrito Federal) - Channel 16 - Since 2023

Curitiba (Paraná) - Channel 17 - Since 2023

São Paulo (São Paulo) - Channel 17 - Since 2025

=== Affiliates ===
- TV Araguaína - Araguaína, Tocantins - Channel 7 - Affiliate since 2020
- TV Cuiabá - Cuiabá, Mato Grosso - Channel 11 - Affiliate since 2021
- TV A Crítica Sinop (old TV Nova Capital) - Sinop, Mato Grosso - Channel 10 - Affiliate since 2021
- SIC TV Pará - Parauapebas, Pará - Channel 24 - Affiliate since 2021
- TV Carajás - Marabá, Pará - Channel 48 (old 3) - Affiliate since 2021
- REMA TV - Porto Velho, Rondônia - Channel 5 - Affiliate since 2022
- TV Tribuna - Rio Branco, Acre - Channel 9 - Affiliate since 2023
- TV Ativa - Boa Vista, Roraima - Channel 20 - Affiliate since 2024
- TV Lupa 1 Teresina - Teresina, Piauí - Channel 8 - Affiliate since 2024
- TV Lupa 1 Brasil - Macapá, Amapá - Channel 5 - Affiliate since 2024
- BDC TV - Autazes, Amazonas - Website - Affiliate since 2024
- TV Peixoto - Peixoto de Azevedo, Mato Grosso - Channel 35 - Affiliate since 2025
- TVC Belém - Belém, Pará - Channel 9 - Affiliate since 2025
- TV Regional - Novo Progresso, Pará - Channel 26 - Affiliate since 2025
- TV Altamira - Altamira, Pará - Channel 6 - Affiliate since in January 2026
- TV Castanhal - Castanhal, Pará - Channel 36 - Affiliate since in 2025

=== Former affiliates ===
- TV A Crítica Belém - Belém, Pará - Channel 40 - Extinct - 2020-2025
- RTN TV - Santarém, Pará / São Paulo, São Paulo - Channels 10 / 17 - Today, TV A Crítica São Paulo - 2023-2025
- TVA - Rio Branco, Acre - Channel 9 - Now an TV Meio Norte affiliate - 2021-2023
- TV Cristal - Palmas, Tocantins - Channel 5 - Now an Record News affiliate
