= Band Ceará =

TV Bandeirantes Ceará
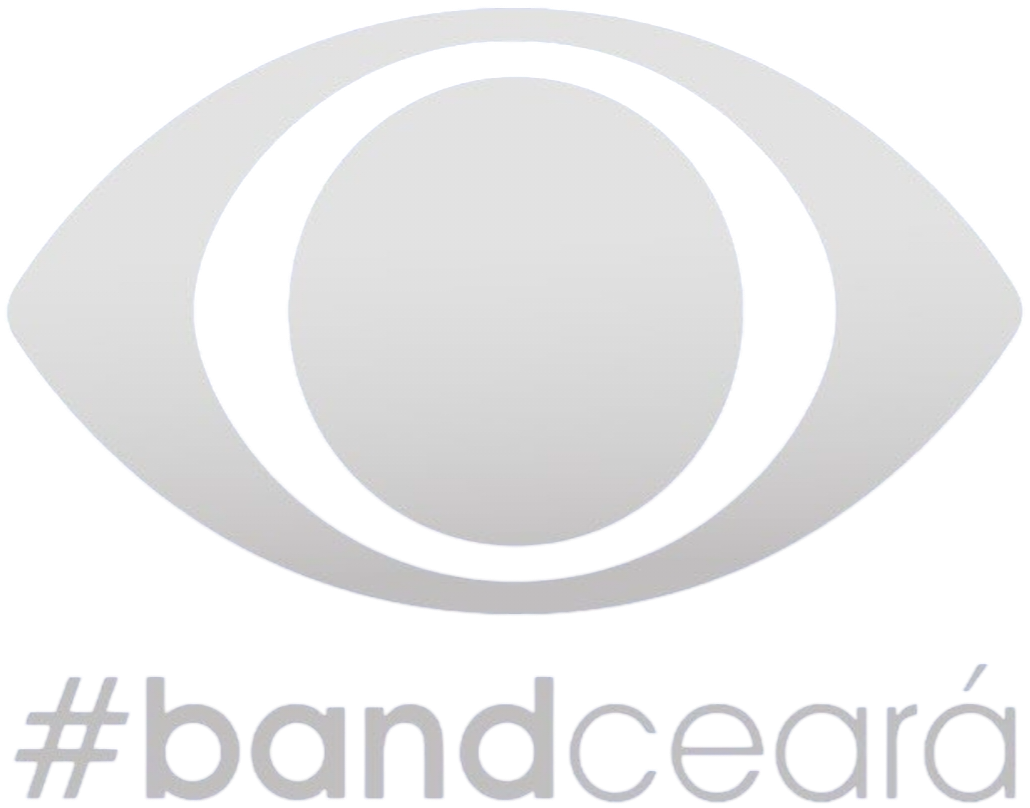

Fortaleza, Ceará; Brazil
- Channels: Digital: 21 (UHF); Virtual: 20
- Branding: Band Ceará

Programming
- Affiliations: Rede Bandeirantes

Ownership
- Owner: Grupo Bandeirantes de Comunicação; (Rádio e Televisão Bandeirantes S.A.)

History
- First air date: June 1, 2020

Technical information
- Licensing authority: ANATEL
- ERP: 4.5 kW
- Transmitter coordinates: 3°44′46.72″S 38°30′1.01″W

Links
- Public license information: Profile
- Website: ibandce.com.br

TV Bandeirantes Ceará (channel 20, also known as Band Ceará) is a Brazilian television station based in Fortaleza, capital of the state of Ceará, carrying Rede Bandeirantes for the entire state. Owned-and-operated by Bandeirantes, the station signed on June 1, 2020, to provide coverage to the network in Ceará after the shuttering of NordesTV, its affiliate since 2015. The broadcaster's signal in Fortaleza is a relay located in São José de Ribamar, Maranhão on digital channel 27, provided by Band Maranhão.

== History ==
The Rede Bandeirantes signal began to be broadcast in Ceará in 1978 through what was then TV Uirapuru in Fortaleza, now TV Cidade, with the affiliation lasting until 1987, when the station began to retransmit SBT programming. In 1990, Bandeirantes was shown again in Fortaleza on TV Jangadeiro, which in 1999 changed its affiliation to SBT. From then on, the network's programming was broadcast on UHF channel 20, which from 2008 to 2012 repeated the Band Nordeste signal.

In 2012, Sistema Jangadeiro de Comunicação, a group to which TV Jangadeiro belongs, launched NordesTV, based in Sobral, which began operating in Fortaleza on channel 20 UHF and retransmitting SBT, while TV Jangadeiro became affiliated with Band again. With the subsequent relocation of NordesTV in Fortaleza to UHF channel 27, channel 20 was occupied by Rede 21, from Grupo Bandeirantes de Comunicação. In 2015 there was a change of affiliation between TV Jangadeiro, which resumed its affiliation with SBT, and NordesTV, which started to retransmit Band through channels 20 (analog) and 21 (digital). Subsequently, UHF analog 27 was deactivated and leased to Sistema Jangadeiro, which leased it to TV Evangelizar.

On May 27, 2020, Grupo Bandeirantes de Comunicação announced the launch of Band Ceará to occupy channel 21 UHF digital in Fortaleza, owned by the conglomerate, through which NordesTV was retransmitted, which would have its activities closed; in Sobral, its headquarters city, the broadcaster was generated by channel 48 UHF, which would repeat TV Jangadeiro.

NordesTV was replaced in the capital by Band Ceará in the early hours of June 1, being a relay of the signal generated since June 17, 2020 in São José de Ribamar, in the state of Maranhão, by channel 27 UHF digital, through which Band Maranhão operated until then, which continued with a repeater in the capital São Luís. Its signal had been uploaded days earlier to the StarOne C3 satellite for testing. Launched by relaying Band's programming and content from other affiliates of the network, the station began generating its own content at the end of June. In April 2021, it opened its headquarters at Salinas Shopping, in the Edson Queiroz neighborhood, in Fortaleza.

In March 2024, Band Ceará launched the Iband CE news portal, and in May its program studio was expanded after a renovation at the headquarters.
