= TV Cidade Verde Picos =

Television station in Piauí, Brazil

TV Cidade Verde Picos (ZYB 360)
- Picos, Piauí; Brazil
- Channels: Digital: 16 (UHF); Virtual: 5

Programming
- Affiliations: SBT

Ownership
- Owner: Web Comunicação Ltda. (license); Grupo Cidade Verde
- Sister stations: TV Cidade Verde Teresina

History
- First air date: April 25, 2022

Technical information
- Licensing authority: ANATEL
- ERP: 2.9 kW
- Transmitter coordinates: 7°4′42.1″S 41°27′47.1″W

Links
- Public license information: Profile
- Website: cidadeverde.com

TV Cidade Verde Picos (channel 5) is a television station licensed to Picos, a city in central-eastern Piauí. The station is owned by Grupo Cidade Verde, who also controls TV Cidade Verde in Teresina, among other companies. Its studios are located on the margins of Rodovia BR-316, in the Boa Sorte neighborhood, and its transmitting antenna is located atop Morro da AABB, in the Catavento neighborhood.

== History ==
The license for a television station in Picos was granted by Luiz Inácio Lula da Silva on July 2, 2003, after public competition won by Web Comunicação Ltda., owned by family members of Piauian businessman Francisco Maia Farias, and was set to operate on analog VHF channel 2. Test transmissions took place in 2015, relaying Polishop TV, however, the station was never officially implemented. With the switchover from analog to digital television, the Ministry of Science, Technology and Innovation issued a license for UHF channel 16, though an ordinance published on December 15, 2017.

In 2021, Grupo Cidade Verde took on the control of the license, and on May 20, it implemented a relay station of TV Cidade Verde from Teresina, replacing the former which was operational on VHF channel 9, which was deactivated, and in the following months, aiming for the production of local programming, studios were built for the station and some staff was hired.

TV Cidade Verde Picos was officially inaugurated on April 25, 2022, with the launch of its regular programming, initially made up of two news bulletins: Notícia de Picos, presented by Jeandra Portela, and Jornal de Picos, presented by Clebson Lustosa, também also responsible for the station's news department.

== Technical information ==
| Virtual | Physical | Screen | Content |
|---|---|---|---|
| 5.1 | 16 (UHF) | 1080i | TV Cidade Verde Picos / SBT's main schedule |
| 5.2 | 16 (UHF) | 1080i | Rádio Cidade Verde |
| 5.3 | 16 (UHF) | 1080i | Rádio CV Mais |

At the time of launching, still as a relay station of TV Cidade Verde, UHF channel 16 had regular programming from Teresina on subchannel 5.1, while on 5.2, Rádio Cidade Verde's programming was broadcast. On April 2, 2022, Rádio CV Mais was added to subchannel 5.3.

== Programming ==
In addition to network relays from Sistema Brasileiro de Televisão, TV Cidade Verde Picos presents two local programs:

- Notícia de Picos: News with Jeandra Portela; reports by Carmo Neto
- Jornal de Picos: News with Clebson Lustosa; reports by Victória Sa, ldanha and Nágyla Santos.

Relayed from TV Cidade Verde Teresina

- Tem de Tudo na TV: Variety, with Shirley Evangelista;
- Cidade Verde Esporte: Sorts news, with Herbert Henrique;
- Jornal do Piauí: News, with Joelson Giordani;
- Jornal Cidade Verde: News, Najla Fernandes;
- Piauí Que Trabalha: Current affairs, with Gorete Santos and Francisco José
