= TV Rio Branco =

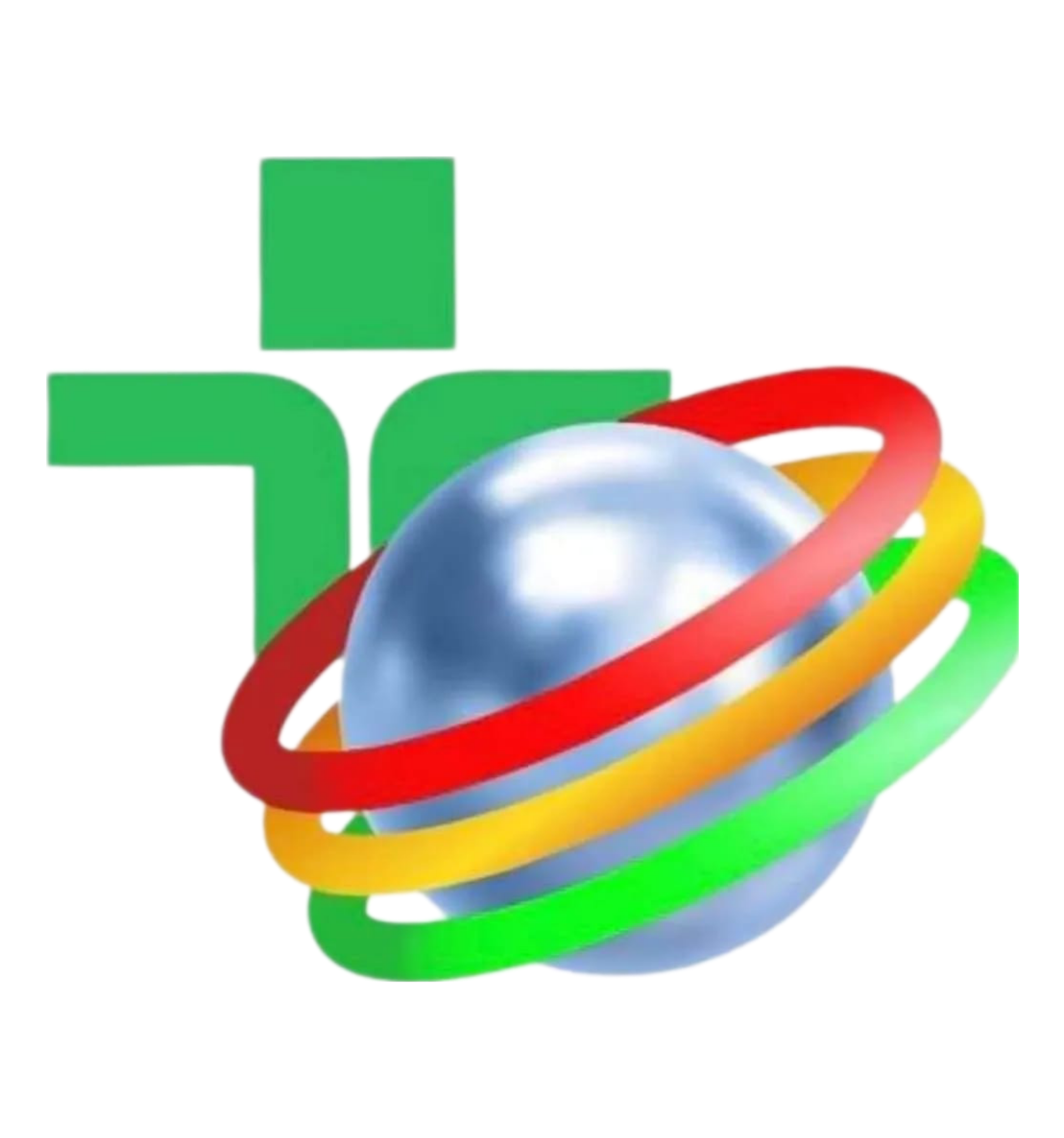
- Rio Branco, Acre; Brazil
- Channels: Digital: 34 (UHF); Virtual: 8

Programming
- Affiliations: TV Cultura

Ownership
- Owner: Complexo O Rio Branco de Comunicação; (Sociedade Acreana de Comunicação Fronteira Ltda.)

History
- Founded: 1987
- First air date: March 15, 1989
- Former channel numbers: Analog: 8 (VHF, 1989–2018)
- Former affiliations: SBT (1989-2022)

Technical information
- Licensing authority: ANATEL
- ERP: 1.1 kW
- Transmitter coordinates: 09°58′09.1″S 67°49′18.3″W

Links
- Public license information: Profile
- Website: www.oriobranco.net

TV Rio Branco (channel 8) is a Brazilian television station based in Rio Branco, capital of the state of Acre, owned by Complexo O Rio Branco de Comunicação. Established in 1987 and beginning its broadcasts in 1989, it was an SBT affiliate until 2022, when it sided with TV Cultura.

== History ==
The Ministry of Communications opened a license for a new station in Rio Branco on channel 8 in 1987. Acrean businessman and politician Narciso Mendes entered the bid, won and began investing on the station.

On March 15, 1989, TV Rio Branco signed on as an affiliate of Sistema Brasileiro de Televisão (SBT). At the time, it was the fourth station to sign on in Rio Branco, after TV Acre (1974), Aldeia (1988) and União (1988). Since launch, it remained one of the longest SBT affiliates in the northern states.

On August 14, 2018, TV Rio Branco shut down its analog signal over two months ahead of the ANATEL timeline.

On March 16, 2022, it was announced that the station would join TV Cultura after 33 years as an SBT affiliate. The change was due to SBT rescinding its contract with TV Rio Branco on October 25, 2021, signing with the newly-launched TV Norte Acre instead.

At midnight sharp on March 28, the affiliation change took place. The first TV Cultura shown by the station was Mosaicos. On the same day, Programa Especial, presented by Antônio Muniz, was shown, where Narciso and Célia Mendes talked about the station's trajectory and new phase. Testimonies from former TV Rio Branco staff were also shown.

== Technical information ==
Virtual channel	Digital channel	Screen	Content
8.1	34 UHF	1080i	TV Rio Branco/TV Cultura's main schedule

The analog signal was switched off on August 14, 2018, more than two months ahead of the October 31 deadline.
