= Band Mato Grosso =

TV Bandeirantes Mato Grosso

Cuiabá, Mato Grosso; Brazil
- Channels: Digital: 14 (UHF); Virtual: 15
- Branding: Band Mato Grosso

Programming
- Affiliations: Rede Bandeirantes

Ownership
- Owner: Grupo Bandeirantes de Comunicação; (Prorad Projetos de Radiodifusão e Telecomunicações Ltda.)

History
- First air date: September 1, 2019

Technical information
- Licensing authority: ANATEL
- ERP: 0.12 kW
- Transmitter coordinates: 15°35′6.4″S 56°4′46.9″W

Links
- Public license information: Profile
- Website: band.com.br/matogrosso

Band Mato Grosso (channel 15) is a Band-owned-and-operated station licensed to Cuiabá, Mato Grosso, owned by Grupo Bandeirantes.

== History ==
Prorad applied for a license on UHF channel 14 (physical, virtual 15) on August 28, 2018.

The station started broadcasting as Band Mato Grosso on September 1, 2019, when TV Cidade Verde Cuiabá disaffiliated from the network. The new station started relaying Band's national line-up, only inserting some station IDs to identify itself.

Band Mato Grosso's first local program came in July 2022, with the airing of the news bulletin Mato Grosso Acontece, presented by Andressa Boa Sorte.

On July 22, 2024, it was announced that presenter Agnelo Corbelino was leaving TV Cidade Verde Cuiabá in order to move his program Passando a Limpo to Band Mato Grosso. Its premiere was in August.

== Technical information ==
Virtual channel	Digital channel	Screen	Content
15.1	14 UHF	1080i	Band Mato Grosso/Band's main schedule

Band Mato Grosso started broadcasting after the switch-off of analog signals in Cuiabá.
