= TV Cidade Verde =

Television station in Piauí, Brazil

TV Cidade Verde (ZYP 311)
- Teresina, Piauí; Brazil
- Channels: Digital: 28 (UHF); Virtual: 5

Programming
- Affiliations: SBT

Ownership
- Owner: Grupo Cidade Verde; (Televisão Pioneira Ltda.)
- Sister stations: Rádio Cidade Verde; Rádio CV Mais

History
- First air date: 23 March 1986
- Former call signs: ZYB 351 (1986–2018)
- Former names: TV Pioneira (1986–1998)
- Former channel numbers: Analog: 5 (VHF, 1986–2018)
- Former affiliations: Rede Bandeirantes (1986–2000)

Technical information
- Licensing authority: ANATEL
- ERP: 2.5 kW
- Transmitter coordinates: 5°6′40.5″S 42°47′41.6″W

Links
- Public license information: Profile
- Website: cidadeverde.com

TV Cidade Verde (channel 5) is a Brazilian television station based in Teresina, the capital of the state of Piauí, Brazil, affiliated with SBT. The station is owned by businessman Jesus Elias Tajra through the Grupo Cidade Verde, which also includes TV Cidade Verde de Picos, the CidadeVerde.com online portal, radio stations Cidade Verde and CV Mais, and the CV Play app.

== History ==
The concession for VHF channel 5 in Teresina was granted by President João Figueiredo on 19 May 1982 to the journalist, businessman, and politician Jesus Elias Tajra, who was the mayor of the municipality at the time. TV Pioneira went on air in December 1985 on an experimental basis, broadcasting Rede Bandeirantes programming, which until then had been aired irregularly by TV Timon (today TV Meio Norte); TV Timon subsequently migrated to SBT. Its name was derived from Rádio Pioneira, belonging to the Archdiocese of Teresina, of which Tajra had been director and announcer.

Four months after going on air, TV Pioneira was formally inaugurated on 23 March 1986 with the airing of its first local program, Jornal da Pioneira, presented by Tony Trindade and Laura Learth. In February 1987, it became the first broadcaster to broadcast Teresina's carnival live, and in March, it broadcast the inauguration of Governor Alberto Silva live, also being the first to carry out this type of coverage.

On 9 November 1998, the broadcaster changed from its original name to TV Cidade Verde. It was in this new phase that the slogan "A boa imagem do Piauí" (The good image of Piauí) emerged, which is used to this day. In 1999, it began transmitting its programming via satellite to 80% of the state, continuing to expand its coverage in the following years. On 9 January 2000, TV Cidade Verde left Rede Bandeirantes and became affiliated with SBT, exchanging affiliations with TV Meio Norte.

On 29 March 2006, TV Cidade Verde celebrated 20 years of foundation. On that occasion, the special program TV Cidade Verde, 20 Years of History was shown, which told the history of the station and that of Piauí, involving society, politics, sport, administration, and arts.

On 19 October 2008, on "Piauí Day", the special program Piauí 250 Anos de História was aired. It sought to faithfully portray the 250 years since Piauí was founded, with the main highlight being a film produced by the station's team telling the history of the independence of the state of Piauí. Due to the success generated by the program, the station decided to release DVDs of the production.

On 7 March 2009, the special program Mulheres do Piauí 2009 was aired at 12:00 pm, on the eve of and in honor of International Women's Day, celebrated on 8 March. It has been held annually since then.

On 17 March, the building housing the retransmission equipment for TV Cidade Verde in Pedro II was invaded by vandals. The reception and distribution equipment for the open TV signal in the city was stolen, along with other devices such as electric fans.

On 10 May, the station debuted the weekly program Feito em Casa, which highlights music, poetry, and local culture. It is shown on Sundays at 10:00 am, with professor Cineas Santos as presenter.

On 16 August, the station celebrated Teresina's 157th anniversary with the Teresina é Show caravan.

On 15 October, in celebration of the 20th anniversary of the Piauí Que Trabalha program, the broadcaster launched the "Fórum Piauí que Trabalha" event. The program focused on holding lectures and paying tribute to supporters, bringing together big names, businesspeople, and politicians from the state in the auditorium of the Federation of Industries of the State of Piauí (FIEPI).

On 23 March 2010, TV Cidade Verde inaugurated a digital auditorium named Estúdio Maria Amélia Tajra, considered one of the largest in the Northeast Region. With 600 square meters, it has an area for exhibitions, appropriate acoustics, new dressing rooms, and all the necessary structure for the broadcasts of the pioneering broadcaster. The occasion also celebrated the first year of digital broadcasting in the state. On that occasion, the Cidade Verde na Copa project was also launched, which took a team from Piauí to follow the World Cup for the first time, with the participation of correspondents Michele Wadja and Herbert Henrique directly from South Africa. A special program of the same name was shown on Saturdays from 27 March to 10 July.

On 21 April, the Miss Piauí 2010 pageant was presented at 9:30 pm, directly from the digital auditorium facilities. Aimed at choosing the most beautiful woman in the state of Piauí, the program was presented by César Filho, Liana Aragão, and Nelito Marques, lasting three hours. It crowned Miss Ipiranga, Lanna Lopes, with the title of Miss Piauí 2010, and Miss Altos, Rayane Sousa, with the title of "Miss dos Internautas" on Portal Cidade Verde.

== Technical information ==
Virtual channel	Physical channel	Aspect ratio	Content
5.1	28 UHF	1080i	TV Cidade Verde / SBT

TV Cidade Verde began its digital transmissions on 23 March 2009 (the date on which it completed 23 years on the air) at 6:00 pm, through channel 28 UHF for Teresina and nearby areas, being the first broadcaster in the state and also the first affiliate of SBT to operate with the new technology. The ceremony that marked the beginning of the broadcasts was attended by SBT's technical director, Roberto Franco, as well as politicians such as Governor Wellington Dias and Senator Heráclito Fortes.

Based on the federal decree transitioning Brazilian TV stations from analog to digital signals, TV Cidade Verde, as well as the other stations in Teresina, ceased broadcasting on channel 5 VHF on 30 May 2018, following the official schedule from ANATEL.

== Programming ==
In addition to retransmitting SBT's national programming, TV Cidade Verde currently produces and broadcasts the following programs:

- Notícia da Manhã: Morning news, with Aline Moreira;
- Tem de Tudo na TV: Variety show, with Shirley Evangelista;
- Cidade Verde Esporte: Sports journalist, with Herbert Henrique;
- Jornal do Piauí: News, with Joelson Giordani;
- Jornal Cidade Verde: Main news, with Najla Fernandes;
- Piauí Que Trabalha: Journalistic, with Gorete Santos and Francisco José.

Yearly events:

- Mulheres do Piauí: Shown during International Women's Day;
- Viva Piauí: Shown during the anniversary of Piauí's Independence (19 October).

Other local programs that were part of the schedule and were later discontinued:

- A Cidade Reclama
- Auto Mundo
- Bola em Jogo
- Cidade Legal
- Cidade Livre
- Cidade Viva
- Classimóveis
- Espaço Empresarial
- Feito em Casa
- Gastronomia
- Gente Muito Interessante
- Horário Nobre com Cinthia Lages
- Jornal da Pioneira
- Jornal de Teresina
- Linha de Frente
- Luzes da Cidade
- Motor Mais
- Nossa Gente
- Papo Mãe
- Piauí Rural
- Pioneira Esporte
- Pioneira Urgente
- Programa Elvira Raulino
- Programa Mara Beatriz
- Sábado Play
- Sinal de Deus
- Studio 5
- Talentos do Piauí
- Tudo de Bom
- TV Vida
- Valor Profissional
- Vida Saudável
- Vídeo Mix

=== Sports ===
- Copa do Nordeste de Futebol (2018–present)
- Campeonato Piauiense de Futebol (2021–present)
