= Band Vale =

TV Bandeirantes Vale (ZYQ 841)
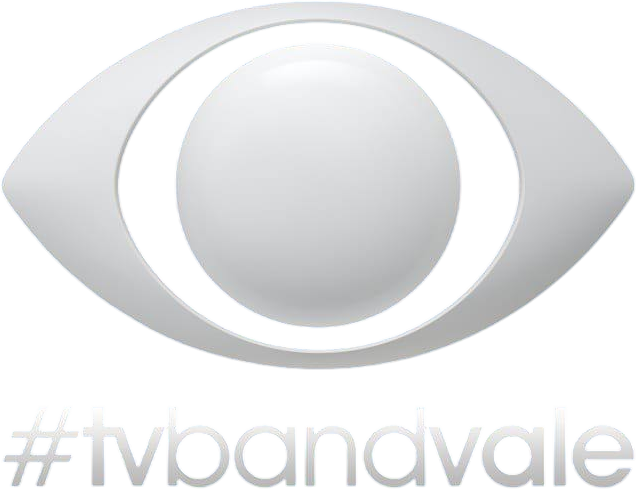
- TV Band Vale logo

Taubaté, São Paulo; Brazil
- Channels: Digital: 26 (UHF); Virtual: 6
- Branding: Band Vale

Programming
- Affiliations: Rede Bandeirantes

Ownership
- Owner: Grupo Bandeirantes de Comunicação; (Rádio e Televisão Taubaté Ltda.)

History
- First air date: 1996
- Former call signs: ZYB 885 (1996-2018)
- Former channel numbers: Analog: 6 (VHF, 1996–2018)

Technical information
- Licensing authority: ANATEL
- ERP: 1.2 kW
- Transmitter coordinates: 23°2′13.4″S 45°32′39.4″W

Links
- Public license information: Profile
- Website: bandvale.com

TV Bandeirantes Vale (channel 6) is a Rede Bandeirantes-owned-and-operated station licensed to Taubaté, São Paulo. Its studios are located on Taubaté Shopping, in the Vila Costa neighborhood, and its transmitting antenna is in the Cristo Redentor neighborhood. In São José dos Campos, its studios are on Colinas Shopping, in the Jardim das Colinas neighborhood, and its transmitters are on the Vila Dirce neighborhood, next to Mirante dos Altos de Santana.

== History ==
The station started broadcasting in 1996; between 1997 and 2007, Band Vale generated its programming to the Baixada Santista region, where, currently, TV Thathi Litoral is received. As of 2009, the station only aired local commercials, but not local programming.

On October 18, 2022, the station left its former studios at Jardim Bela Vista in São José dos Campos, and inaugurated a new, modern complex at Colinas Shopping, with 800 m², maintaining its integrated structure with Grupo Bandeirantes de Comunicação's radio stations in the Vale do Paraíba region.

== Technical information ==
Virtual channel	Digital channel	Aspect ratio	Content
6.1	UHF 19	1080i	Band/Band Vale programming

The station shut down its analog signal on VHF channel 6 on January 13, 2018, following the official ANATEL roadmap.
