= Band Piauí =

TV Bandeirantes Piauí (ZYP 275)
- Parnaíba/Teresina, Piauí; Brazil
- Channels: Digital: 42 (UHF); Virtual: 5 (Parnaíba) 38 (Teresina)
- Branding: Band Piauí

Programming
- Affiliations: Rede Bandeirantes

Ownership
- Owner: Grupo Bandeirantes de Comunicação; (Rádio e TV Schappo Ltda.)

History
- First air date: April 18, 2014
- Former call signs: ZYB 359 (1986-2018)
- Former channel numbers: Analog: 5 (VHF, 2014–2018)

Technical information
- Licensing authority: ANATEL
- ERP: 1.2 kW
- Transmitter coordinates: 2°55′3.5″S 41°45′23″W

Links
- Public license information: Profile
- Website: bandpiaui.com.br

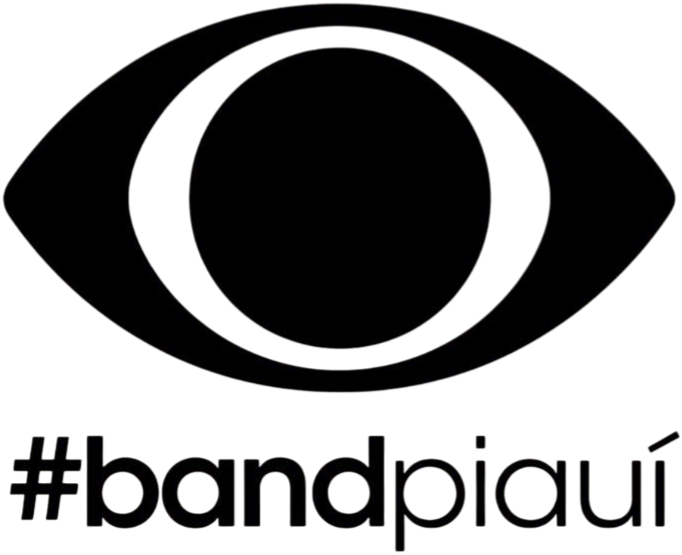
Band Piauí logo.

Band Piauí is a Rede Bandeirantes-owned-and-operated station licensed to Parnaíba but with studios and offices in Teresina, capital of Piauí. Its studios are located in Teresina, in the Jóquei neighborhood, while its transmitting tower is in Monte Castelo. In Parnaíba, its transmitters are located on TV Delta's headquarters, in the São Francisco da Guarita neighborhood.

== History ==
The license for the implementation of a commercial television station in Parnaíba was awarded in the early 2000s by Alagoan politician João Caldas, through a company set up by Evandro José Schappo and Simony Oliveira Martins. However, the price paid for the license, as well as the participation in other licenses where equally high prices raised awareness for a possible post-acquisition resale process to other groups.

Years after the license was granted, and without even signing on, local businessmen Marcelo Claudino and Dalton Leal rented the license for VHF channel 5 in Parnaíba, as well as VHF channel 12 in Timon (in the name of TV Difusora of São Luís, Maranhão) and initiated the process to implement a new television station in Piauí. Under the name TV Perspectiva, the station started experimental broadcasts on April 18, 2014, initially relaying Band's schedule, which had no affiliate in the state since TV Meio Norte left the network on December 31, 2010.

The owners even launched a news portal, O Olho, which would sustain the group responsible for the station. However, in 2015, Claudino and Leal abandoned the project, and after giving up on its go-ahead, Grupo Bandeirantes de Comunicação took over the station, naming journalist Diego Trajano as its regional director. The station was renamed Band Piauí, becoming the network's fifteenth owned-and-operated station.

On August 30, 2021, the station left its former headquarters at Cidade Nova, and inaugurated its new facilities in the Jóquei neighborhood, prime area in Teresina. On October 11, it also restructured its local output, introducing new programs.
