= TV Norte Amazonas =

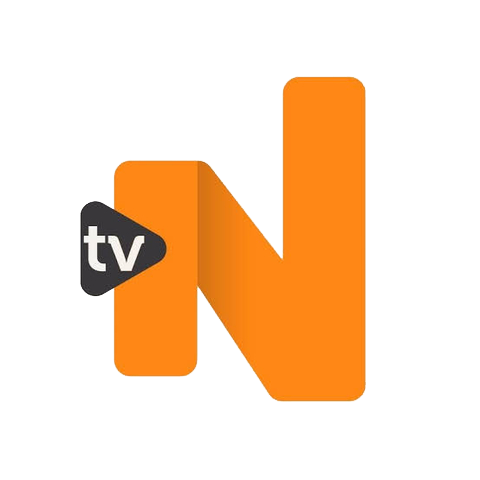

Manaus, Amazonas; Brazil
- Channels: Digital: 34 (UHF); Virtual: 10

Programming
- Affiliations: SBT

Ownership
- Owner: Grupo Norte de Comunicação; (Sociedade de Televisão Manauara Ltda.)
- Sister stations: Norte FM

History
- First air date: April 9, 1992
- Former names: TV Manaus (1992-2008); TV Em Tempo (2008-2020)
- Former channel numbers: Analog: 10 (VHF, 1992–2018)
- Former affiliations: Record (1992-2007)

Technical information
- Licensing authority: ANATEL
- ERP: 1 kW
- Transmitter coordinates: 3°5′39.3″S 59°59′30.8″W

Links
- Public license information: Profile
- Website: portalnortedenoticias.com.br

TV Norte Amazonas (channel 10) is an SBT-affiliated station licensed to Manaus, capital of the state of Amazonas. The station is owned by locally based Grupo Norte de Comunicação, a regional media conglomerate, owned by businessman Sérgio Bringel as its flagship television unit. The group owns several television stations in northern Brazil and Paraíba, most of which are SBT affiliates.

== History ==
TV Manaus was founded on April 9, 1992 by Sadie Hauache, six years after the sale of her previous TV asset, TV Ajuricaba (channel 8) to Grupo Simões. At launch, it was the first affiliate of Record after its conversion to a national network per the orders of Edir Macedo.

In 2007, the station was acquired by local newspaper Amazonas em Tempo, being renamed TV Em Tempo. The move coincided with a shift in affiliations happening in Manaus, where former SBT affiliate TV A Crítica decided to assume Record's affiliation, dissatisfied with SBT's volatile schedule, with constant changes. The switch took place in August.

On February 18, 2012, due to transmission failures between the Manaus Sambódromo and the station's broadcasting complex at Aleixo, TV Em Tempo stopped airing part of its carnaval coverage, causing uproar from local viewers on social media; the station had to air SBT's networked coverage from Bahia. After the problem was solved, five out of the twelve hours of the event were broadcast. The station apologized and gave back R$1.3 million to the state government, which was the amount of money the station invested in the coverage. The station lost the rights to the 2013 carnaval to TV Tiradentes as a side effect of the loss.

At the end of 2019, Bringel had problems with Raman Neves regarding its control, claiming that the businessman had failed to comply with contractual clauses and claiming ownership of TV Em Tempo after the investments made. in 2020, Grupo Norte de Comunicação, owned by Grupo Bringel and operating in the states of Acre, Federal District, Roraima e Tocantins, where it also has radio and TV stations, started claiming total control of the station. On June 1, TV Em Tempo was renamed TV Norte Amazonas.
