= TV Jangadeiro =

TV Jangadeiro (ZYA 430)
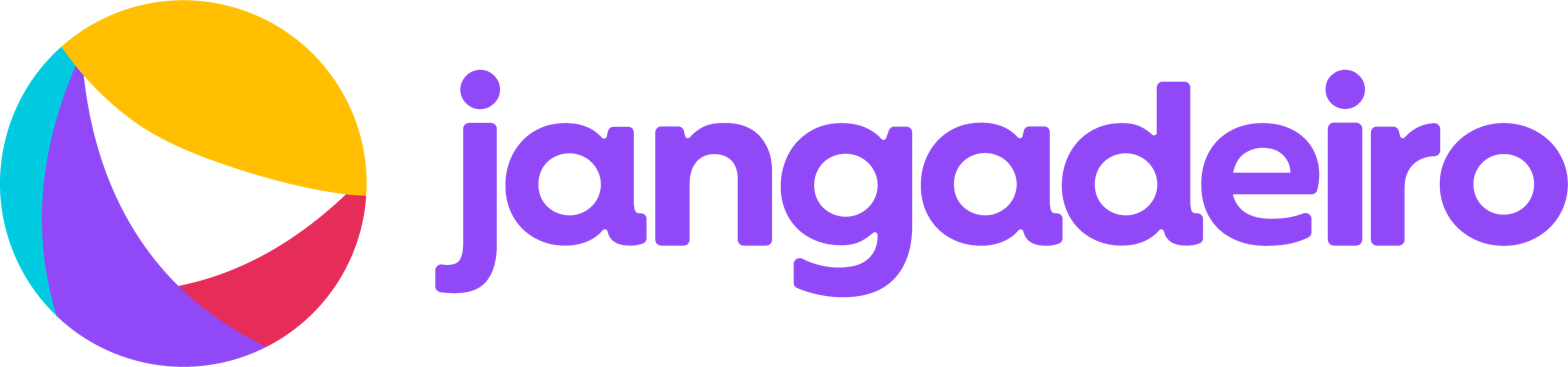

Fortaleza, Ceará; Brazil
- City: Fortaleza
- Channels: Digital: 35 (UHF); Virtual: 12
- Branding: Jangadeiro

Programming
- Affiliations: SBT (1999-2012; 2015-present)

Ownership
- Owner: Jangadeiro; (TV Jangadeiro Ltda.)

History
- Founded: March 13, 1990
- Former channel numbers: Analog: 12 (VHF, 1990-2017)
- Former affiliations: Rede Bandeirantes (1990-1998; 2012-2015)

Technical information
- Licensing authority: ANATEL
- ERP: 12 kW

Links
- Public license information: Profile
- Website: jangadeiro.com.br

TV Jangadeiro (channel 12) is a television station licensed to Fortaleza, Ceará, affiliated with SBT and it is part of the pool of enterprises named Sistema Jangadeiro de Comunicação.

== History ==
When it started to broadcast on March 13, 1990, TV Jangadeiro had the basic proposal of offering quality programming focused on infotainment. In its inception it got affiliated with the Brazilian TV network Rede Bandeirantes.

On December 31, 1998, left Bandeirantes to join SBT, which was down because its affiliate, TV Cidade had started to share Rede Record in 1998. In 2009, began broadcasting on HDTV. On the date of April 2, 2012, almost 15 years with SBT, TV Jangadeiro departed from it and returned to its former network, Rede Bandeirantes, broadcasting their programming to all Ceara State in Brazil.
