= Band São Paulo =

TV Bandeirantes São Paulo (ZYB 852)
- São Paulo; Brazil
- Channels: Digital: 23 (UHF); Virtual: 13
- Branding: Band; Band São Paulo

Programming
- Affiliations: Rede Bandeirantes

Ownership
- Owner: Grupo Bandeirantes de Comunicação; (Rádio e Televisão Bandeirantes S/A)
- Sister stations: Rádio Bandeirantes São Paulo; BandNews FM São Paulo; Band FM; Nativa FM

History
- First air date: May 13, 1967
- Former channel numbers: Analog: 13 (VHF, 1967-2017)

Technical information
- Licensing authority: ANATEL
- ERP: 15 kW
- Transmitter coordinates: 23°33′20.1″S 46°39′56″W

Links
- Public license information: Profile
- Website: band.com.br

Band São Paulo (channel 13) is a Brazilian television station based in São Paulo, serving as the flagship station of Band, covering the Metropolitan Region of São Paulo and part of the interior of São Paulo. Owned and operated by locally based Grupo Bandeirantes de Comunicação, its studios are in the Jardim Leonor neighborhood, and its transmission antenna, Torre da Band, is in Consolação, facing Avenida Paulista.

== History ==
The station started test broadcasts from its transmitter at Pico do Jaraguá in February 1967 and started regular broadcasts on May 13, 1967, with a speech by its founder, businessman João Jorge Saad, followed by a show by singers Agostinho dos Santos and Cláudia, who opened the broadcasts. The president of the republic Arthur da Costa e Silva, the governor of São Paulo Abreu Sodré, the mayor of the capital of São Paulo Faria Lima, as well as ministers and secretaries of state were present. A children's playground and a free circus were set up in front of the station's headquarters for families with lower purchasing power. For two days there were competitions and games, with the distribution of commemorative gifts and 5 houses were drawn for poor mothers. It was the sixth television station to go on air in São Paulo. A fire hit the station's facilities on September 17, 1969. In 1972, it became the first television station to produce all of its in-house programming in color.

In 2022, Cris Moreira was appointed director-general of Band's radio and TV operations in São Paulo.

== Technical information ==
Virtual channel	Digital channel	Screen	Content
13.1	23 UHF	1080i	Main Band SP programming/Band

Band São Paulo started its digital broadcasts on virtual UHF channel 23, on December 2, 2007, when Brazil launched its digital terrestrial transmissions. Its first productions in high definition were Jornal da Band and telenovela Dance Dance Dance, which, even though it premiered before the implementation of its digital signal (October 1), it was already produced and finalized in the format. Until 2010, most of the programs aired by the station were already produced in HD.
