= Rede Bandeirantes =

Brazilian commercial television network

Band
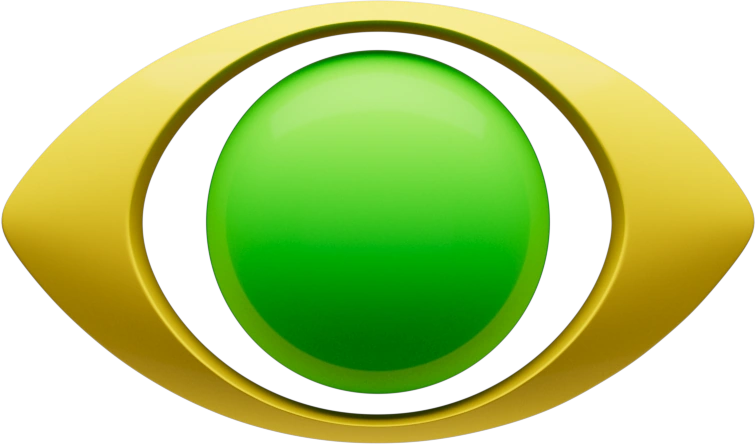
- Type: Free-to-air television network
- Country: Brazil
- Stations: TV Band SP; TV Band Rio; TV Band Brasília; TV Band Minas; TV Band BA; TV Band AM; TV Band PR; TV Band RS; TV Band RN; TV Band PI; TV Band Mais; TV Band Paulista; TV Band Vale; TV Band Rio Interior; TV Band Triângulo; TV Band CE; TV Band TO; TV Band MT
- Affiliates: see List of Rede Bandeirantes affiliates
- Headquarters: São Paulo, Brazil

Programming
- Language: Portuguese
- Picture format: 1080i HDTV

Ownership
- Owner: Grupo Bandeirantes de Comunicação
- Key people: Johnny Saad (chairman)

History
- Launched: May 13, 1967; 59 years ago
- Founder: João Jorge Saad
- Former names: TV Bandeirantes (1967–1975); Rede Bandeirantes (1975–1995)

Links
- Website: band.com.br

Availability

Terrestrial
- Digital UHF: 14 UHF (Cuiabá); 16 UHF (Campinas, João Pessoa and Vitória); 17 UHF (Uberaba and São Luís); 19 UHF (Presidente Prudente); 20 UHF (Belo Horizonte and Recife); 21 UHF (Fortaleza); 22 UHF (Manaus); 23 UHF (São Paulo and Taubaté); 26 UHF (Brasília); 30 UHF (Natal and Goiânia); 32 UHF (Porto Alegre); 33 UHF (Barra Mansa); 34 UHF (Macapá); 35 UHF (Rio de Janeiro); 38 UHF (Curitiba); 39 UHF (Maceió); 42 UHF (Paranaíba); 43 UHF (Aracaju); 46 UHF (Salvador)

Rede Bandeirantes (Portuguese pronunciation: [ˈʁedʒi bɐ̃dejˈɾɐ̃tʃis], Bandeirantes Network), or simply known as Band (Portuguese pronunciation: [ˈbɐ̃dʒi]), is a Brazilian free-to-air television network. It began broadcasting on May 13, 1967 on VHF channel 13 in São Paulo. Its founder was businessman João Saad with the help of his father-in-law and former São Paulo governor Adhemar de Barros. In terms of audience and revenue, it is currently the fourth largest Brazilian television network. It broadcasts throughout Brazil through its owned-and-operated stations and affiliates. It also has a series of pay TV channels and it broadcasts internationally via Band Internacional.

It was the first station to have all of its programming in color in 1972, and it was also the first to broadcast via satellite, being the pioneer network in the use of exclusive satellite channels for its simulcasts throughout Brazil in 1982. In 1990, when it was called Bandeirantes, the station changed the name to simply "Band". However, due to the fact that the public was not pleased with this change, it was turned back to "Bandeirantes". The first use of the name "Band" was during a broadcast of the carnival in 1995, and on the same occasion, it became the first Brazilian station to insert its logo on the corner of the screen, being the so-called "watermark".

During the 1980s and 1990s, it became known as "the sports channel", due to the network broadcasting the most varied sports genres, under the influence of announcer Luciano do Valle, being the first to broadcast the IndyCar Series, the NBA and the Italian and Spanish football championships. The journalistic coverage was another recognition of Band, in carrying out debates between political candidates on television. It became the second TV station to hold a debate for the Governor of São Paulo in 1982 and it was the first to carry out debates between political candidates for the Presidency in 1989.

== History ==
=== Background ===
In 1945, in São Paulo, businessman João Jorge Saad, a descendant of a Syrian migrant family from Damascus, bought Rádio Bandeirantes from his father-in-law Ademar de Barros, which the then-governor of São Paulo had bought from its previous owner, Paulo Machado de Carvalho, the owner of Rádio Record and Emissoras Unidas. During the administration of President Getúlio Vargas, João Saad managed to obtain the concession of a television channel in São Paulo in the 1950s. During the Juscelino Kubitschek government, the concession was canceled and handed over to another businessman. However, Saad managed, at the time of the João Goulart government, to recover the TV station. In 1961 in Morumbi, work began on the Radiantes Building – a building specially built with the purpose of housing the most modern television studios in Latin America, and later nicknamed by employees as an "enchanted palace". The station's building, the first in the country to be designed to receive a TV, took about five years to build. Saad has postponed the start of operations several times: "It wasn't time yet... I only opened the station in '67, based on solid foundations", he said. With a transmission tower on Pico do Jaraguá, in February 1967, experimental broadcasts began, with slides, films and documentaries.

=== Early years ===
TV Bandeirantes officially started broadcasting regularly on May 13, 1967, with a speech by its founder, João Jorge Saad, followed by a concert by singers Agostinho dos Santos and Cláudia, who opened the broadcasts. The people present during that time were generally politicians, including President Costa e Silva, the governor of São Paulo Abreu Sodré, the mayor of São Paulo Faria Lima, and ministers and secretaries of state. A playground and a free circus for low-income families were set up in front of the station's headquarters. For two days, there were scavenger hunts and games, with the distribution of commemorative gifts and 5 houses were drawn for poor mothers.

Bandeirantes has invested from the beginning in sports, films and journalism. For Saad, programming had to be "eclectic". According to him, you couldn't "raise the level of the programs too much, otherwise there won't be an audience". Initially, a novelty was tested in the programming grid, eliminating the inter-program intervals. In 1967, days after the opening, the first soap opera on the then TV Bandeirantes, Os Miseráveis, adapted by Walther Negrão and Chico de Assis, came on the air, with an innovation: chapters lasting 45 minutes. The first news program of the network was Holders News, a corresponding traditional program of Radio Bandeirantes. The program Ari Toledo Show stood out; Leporace Show, with Vicente Leporace; Cláudia Querida, with the singer; I Love Lúcio, music and humor show led by Lúcio Mauro and Arlete Salles; Além, Além do Além, a horror theater with Zé do Caixão. In a short time, the direction of the station was transferred to Gilberto Martins and Antonino Seabra. In 1968, the program Xênia e Vocêwas shown on the network at 3 pm, which remained on the network for years, and was presented by Xênia Bier. Also that year, TV Bandeirantes aired the Sítio do Picapau Amarelo at 6:30 pm, and at 7:30 pm, As Aventuras de Rin-tin-tin.

==== 1969 fire ====
On September 19, 1969, the station suffered a devastating fire, which destroyed its facilities. Most of the station's archives and equipment have been lost due to the fire. The slogan at the time was: "Bandeirantes will not stop". The fire that occurred in the Morumbi studios led to a rush to rent the Cine Arlequim, on Avenida Brigadeiro Luís Antônio, in São Paulo, which was named Teatro Bandeirantes. All TV Bandeirantes programming was generated from Cine Arlequim, which was quickly transformed into Teatro Bandeirantes. The fire in Bandeirantes was similar to those of Rede Globo, Rede Record and Rede Excelsior. All four fires occurred in less than a week, prompting authorities to attribute the four fires to acts of sabotage, under a single command. The TV Bandeirantes fire was the biggest of the four, with damage estimated to be around Cr$15 million. This fire lasted three and a half hours and the fire would have started, at the same time, in three different points. On the occasion, the Commander of the Second Army, General Canavarro Pereira, and Governor Abreu Sodréthey expressed the certainty that these incidents "are part of a terrorist plan" and called for the people's help to fight the extremists. Before this problem, João Saad would have been advised by a fortune teller to sell the station for foreseeing a fire. In an interview, he reportedly said that he did not believe because he thought she was serving a competitor. The network had three major seasons of production/exhibition of television drama. The first was in the first years of operation, from 1967 to 1970. During this period, in addition to the aforementioned Os Miseráveis, novelas such as Era Necessidade Back and O Bolha were produced.

=== 1970s ===
==== Sports programming and color broadcasting ====
In 1970, the network broadcast the 1970 FIFA World Cup, the first live sports broadcast in Brazil. The station participated in a transmission pool organized by the Federal Government, in which Rede Globo, Rede Tupi and REI also participated. The first color broadcasts were in 1972 with the display of the Grape Festival in Caxias do Sul. Bandeirantes participated in the group of stations that aired the event, from video generated by TV Difusora, from Porto Alegre, which was purchased on June 30, 1980 by Grupo Bandeirantes, transforming it into TV Bandeirantes Rio Grande do Sul. Although the station was still operating amid the losses caused by the 1969 fire, the transmission was made thanks to equipment imported from Germany. During that same year, Band became the first broadcaster in Brazil to produce all of its programming in color. The slogan "Bandeirantes: the colorful image of São Paulo" was launched for the occasion, which featured a Peacock, inspired by NBC's Laramie Peacock as a nod to NBC's partnership with the network.

==== New, popular shows ====
In 1973, the program Japan Pop Show premiered, presented by the Japanese-Brazilian couple Suzana Matsuda and Nelson Matsuda. It was exhibited on Sundays and followed the same format as Rede Tupi's Images from Japan. On June 16, 1974, one of the most popular and long-lived programs in Brazil debuted on Saturday afternoons on the network: Clube do Bolinha, presented by Édson Cury, widely known as "Bolinha". The program remained on air until May 7, 1994. On August 12, 1974, the new Teatro Bandeirantes was inaugurated, in a great show that brought together Elis Regina, Chico Buarque, Maria Bethânia, Tim Maia and Rita Lee.

==== The transition to a national network ====
In 1975, Bandeirantes began to become a national television network with the purchase of TV Vila Rica, which became TV Bandeirantes Minas. On July 7, 1977, at 7 pm, TV Bandeirantes arrived in Rio de Janeiro on channel 7, after the purchase of TV Guanabara. In the same year, the stations comprising Rede Amazônica also became part of the newly created network.

==== New shows ====
In 1977, presenter Hebe Camargo started to present her program on Sunday nights and marked her return to television after 4 years being solely dedicated to radio, which had a familiar model with interviews, musicals and information. The most memorable moments of the program were the interview with Chico Xavier and when Hebe threw her microphone on the floor in the middle of the live broadcast of the program and complained about the station. She demanded better treatment from the channel and more resources, such as new sets, more people in the production and musicians in the orchestra, who promised to serve her. In 1986, the presenter left the station and signed with SBT.

=== 1980s ===
==== The expansion of news programming ====
In the early 1980s, Jornal Bandeirantes (currently known as Jornal da Band) was presented by Ferreira Martins and Joelmir Beting, with comments by Newton Carlos on international issues. Ronaldo Rosas presented the news from Rio de Janeiro. At that time, Rede Bandeirantes also aired Canal Livre, whose history was confused with the political opening that was taking place during the military dictatorship. Initially presented by Roberto D'Ávila and directed by Fernando Barbosa Lima, it was seen as a way for the network to show a more critical journalism, a fact that still occurs today.

==== National expansion ====
Keeping the expansion and qualification of the network's signal, one more channel came on the air, TV Bandeirantes Bahia, on April 11, 1981 on VHF channel 7. The channel also gained its first affiliates in the Northeast Region, including TV Uirapuru from Fortaleza in 1979, TV Atalaia from Aracaju in 1980, and TV Ribamar from São Luís in 1981. Until then, TV Bandeirantes already had more than 24 stations spread across Brazil.

==== Management changes and more new shows ====
In 1981, the network hired Walter Clark Bueno as programming general director, who was one of those responsible for Rede Globo's success in the 1960s and 1970s. Clark was a pioneer of Brazilian television when he created the concept of fixed programming schedules, and he came trying to repeat this success on the São Paulo station. He created programs such as the news program O Repórter, presented at lunchtime, by William Bonner, César Filho and Ângela Rodrigues Alves. At the end of the night, the program Etc, by Ziraldo (where a historic interview with Hélder Câmara was made) was highlighted . An innovative attempt was the program Variety 90 Minutos, presented at night by Paulo César Pereio and his then wife, actress Cissa Guimarães. Between 1981 and 1984, actor Ewerton de Castro ran a talk show, where people signed up to participate in a memory game and distributed various prizes. There was a special program that brought together the biggest winners of that show to meet the biggest memory champion.

During this period, director and producer Roberto Talma forms a brief partnership with Bandeirantes in order to produce new musical and cultural projects for the group, and it is at this time of renewal that Talma takes the presenters Oliveira Filho and Vera Lúcia to Bandeirantes to lead a new format of country music program Rincão Brasileiro, which initially in its pilot phase was initially produced in the studio, later going on to be fully recorded in external locations and in different regions of Brazil. The Rincão Brasileiro Program was responsible for introducing Brazil to a new concept of making country music, revealing several names in music such as Sula Miranda, Jayne, Zezé de Camargo, Leandro e Leonardo, Daniel, César and Paulinho, among so many names, the Rincão Brasileiro together with the Clube do Bolinha Program, were for several consecutive years the main musical programs in Brazil. Rincão Brasileiro remained on the air on Bandeirantes until the early 1990s, going to other stations and later returning to the Bandeirantes grid in some regions. The program remained on air until 2014 on other stations.

In August 1982, the telenovela Renúncia, based on the work of Chico Xavier, with Fúlvio Stefanini and Georgia Gomide, appeared. With the total failure in the audience, the station decides to take the telenovela off the air with only 12 days of airing, taking advantage of the entry of the political timetable, which at the time lasted more than an hour. On September 29, 1982, commemorating the fact of becoming the first television network in South America to broadcast via satellite, TV Bandeirantes changed the logo and visual programming, prepared by Cyro Del Nero, who came from the former Rede Tupi. In the same year, the station was a pioneer in promoting the country's first electoral debate in 1982, maintaining the tradition of promoting the first electoral debate every two years, until 2000.

In 1983, Bandeirantes took advantage of TV Globo's premature end of the soap opera Sol de Verão, due to the death of actor Jardel Filho, having to rerun the soap opera O Casarão (while Gilberto Braga was quickly preparing the soap Louco Amor) to try to attract viewers with the soap opera Sabor de Mel, by Jorge Andrade, starring Sandra Bréa and Raul Cortez. The telenovela had a differential: a contest for anyone to unravel a puzzle proposed in the first chapters. However, the author of the novel had a falling out with director Roberto Talma resigned, never revealing the answer to the riddle.

Flávio Cavalcanti became the channel's biggest investment in the early 1980s, with his daily show Boa Noite Brasil. One of the most memorable moments of the program happened when singer Angela Ro Ro left the studios in the middle of a live interview, for not accepting Cidinha Campos' questions about her homosexuality and supposed aggressiveness. After Flávio moved to SBT, where he ended his career, the Bandeirantes' nights were handed over, among others, to J. Silvestre, with the Show sem Limite and the These Wonderful Women. Before going to TV Globo, right after leaving Rede Tupi, Chacrinhait had its programs Buzina do Chacrinha and Discoteca do Chacrinha on Tuesday nights and Saturday afternoons, respectively.

==== A record-breaking program ====
In 1983, the sports program Show do Esporte, which was considered the longest television program in the world, went on air for 10 hours straight on Sundays, from 10:00 am to 8:00 pm. Created, presented and coordinated by the announcer Luciano do Valle after his time at Rede Record; the remaining cast include Elia Júnior, Juarez Soares, Elys Marina, Silvia Vinhas, José Luiz Datena, Jota Júnior and others. It was one of the network's most successful shows, and one of the factors that earned it the nickname "sports channel" in the 1990s. by the Ferreira Neto Program, a chat with politicians. He always started the program talking, on a red telephone, with a fictional friend named Léo, using this device to comment on the facts of the day.

==== The Olympics, Diretas Já and more news programs ====
During 1984, the network was able to stand out in the Diretas Já movement that swept throughout Brazil. That same year, it covered the Summer Olympics for the first time, broadcasting 1984 Summer Olympics in Los Angeles. The program Brasil Urgente also began, which is a debate program presented by Antonio Carvalho. The morning schedule was filled with the program Ela, initially presented by Baby Garroux, who was replaced by Heloísa Pinheiro. In 1987, Ela ended broadcasting and it was replaced by the culinary program Dia Dia, presented by Tavinho Ceschi and psychotherapist Angelo Gaiarsa.

In 1986, Rede Bandeirantes launched the news program Jornal da Noite, where Lillian Witte Fibe premiered. In the same year, Orival Pessini debuted on TV Fofão, with Hanna-Barbera cartoons, raffles, humorous paintings, musicals and other attractions. The sports news program Esporte Total debuted that same year. On January 23, 1987, TV Bandeirantes Brasília aired on channel 4 in the federal capital.

==== New favorites ====
After leaving TV Mulher and after being a US correspondent for Fantástico, Marília Gabriela won her own nightly program. Marilia Gabriela Gabi, which airs on Wednesdays. Later on, Gabi continued to stay with the Sunday program Cara a Cara until 1995. Rede Bandeirantes also premiered the comedy show Praça Brasil, with Carlos Alberto de Nóbrega, Moacyr Franco, and the entire cast of the comedian. And soon after being on SBT, it would gain the name of A Praça É Nossa.

In 1988, under the command of reestreia Dóris Giesse and the direction of Fernando Barbosa Lima, the news program Jornal de Vanguarda started broadcasting on Bandeirantes, which previously broadcast on Rede Globo and the now-defunct Rede Excelsior. The program lasted two years and in its last year, it gained the name of Vanguarda. That same year, the network covered the Olympic Games, held in Seoul, for the second time.

==== Plays and political debates ====
On January 2, 1989, the clown duo Atchim % Espirro debuted Circo da Alegria. Along the lines of Brincando na Paulista of TV Gazeta, the show featured skits, raffles, games, cartoons of Hanna-Barbera, games, music, raffles and other attractions. Circo da Alegria was on the air until March 9, 1990, when he hears an internal problem between the pair. He re-released in Bandeirantes the old version of TV Criança. Later that year, the station promoted the first debate between candidates for the Presidency of the Republic, during the elections of 1989.

=== 1990s ===
==== Competition and Japanese programming ====
Headed by the competition and success that Japanese series provided at the same time by Rede Manchete, TV Criança made its debut in 1990, replacing Circo da Alegria. Presented by the artist Daniel Azulay and his group Turma do Lambe-Lambe, TV Criança started to show Hanna-Barbera's cartoons, and also a series of the genre: Goggle V (the same formula as Dengeki Sentai Changeman, a successful program in Manchete), Space Sheriff Sharivan (also known by some as Jaspion I) and Nebula Mask Machineman, all brought by Oro Movies. It also debuted Choujinki Metalder, but this series came from Everest Video, and even today, fans question that if it had been shown on Rede Manchete, the success would have been greater, since the channel was the cradle of the exhibition of Japanese series in Brazil and also of the series of the character from the series Chaves, along with the Venezuelan series Kiko. Anime was also aired on the network with Dragon Ball Z being one of the more popular anime to air on the block.

==== Expansion of sports programming and Jornal Bandeirantes ====
From the 1990s onwards, Bandeirantes began to adopt programs based on sports programming, creating Nobre Sport Belt (every day from 8:30 pm), in addition to the Cinto Esportivo Especial, lasting a few minutes, shown in the evening schedules. On Sundays, Rede Bandeirantes dedicated them entirely to sports broadcasts, with Show do Esporte. After 12 years, Bandeirantes returned to broadcasting the World Cup directly from Italy.

Jornal Bandeirantes changed presenters, being presented by Marilia Gabriela and later by Chico Pinheiro. Unlike most journalists at the time, the news ended each day with the sound of current pop music. The set was a black wall with a huge red ball in the middle, like the one that was part of the network's logo at the time.

==== 1992: 25 years on the air ====
In 1992, Rede Bandeirantes celebrated its 25 years on the air. With the intention of commemoration, between May 16 and 17, the channel made a show with several attractions and with the cast of the channel gathered. In addition to the coverage of the 1992 Summer Olympics, held in Barcelona, Spain, the network was the first to broadcast the NBA, CART and the Italian and Spanish football championships for the first time on free-to-air TV, which earned it the nickname of "The sports channel". That same year, the network covered the CPI's investigation of the Collor case in Brazil from the beginning, which led to the president's resignation at the end of the year.

==== Erotic programming, the 1994 elections, and the debut of the "watermark" ====
In 1993, the channel debuted the erotic film session Sexta Sexy (now known as Cine Privé), shown on Friday nights, and in 1995, it debuted in the early mornings from Saturday to Sunday, Cine Privé, also known for presenting films of the same genre. On April 30, 1994, the program Clube do Bolinha left the station on Saturday afternoons after 20 years on the air. In June, Rede Bandeirantes broadcast the 1994 FIFA World Cup in the United States. Between August and November, Rede Bandeirantes made a live broadcast throughout the country, through a presidential debate with the candidates for the Presidency of the Republic for the 1994 elections, gaining prominence for its coverage, where it left to present its programming in favor of round tables, interviews, analyses, special reports and live flashes. In 1995, the Band became a pioneer in displaying its logo in the corner of the screen during its programming which would be the first "watermark" of Brazilian television, which influenced the competing stations to also fix their logos in the corner of the screen during its programs.

==== The 1996 Olympics, Programa H, and the re-run of TV Fofão ====
In 1996, directly from Atlanta, in the United States, the station broadcasts the Olympics for the fourth time. This year, it was heavily criticized because of schedule changes and failure to air its programs at scheduled time. Also in 1996, presenter Luciano Huck premiered Programa H, aimed at young audiences. Due to the great repercussion and prominence, the program was soon moved to the evening schedules. That same year, TV Fofão, by Orival Pessini, returned to the network for children, and remained on the air until 1997.

==== Program changes and the inauguration of Torre TV Bandeirantes ====
At the end of October, looking for a more feminine, young and popular line, the station presents some changes in its programming. Rede Bandeirantes started to show a section of films dedicated to women and children. At 3:30 pm, it broadcast re-runs of the 1987 series Bronco. Cine Trach was also featured, generally in the afternoons, which featured horror movies, most of which were low-budget. Zé do Caixão, led by José Mojica Marins, started to be shown on Monday nights. At night, Bandeirantes bets on the female streak. At 6 pm, the debate program presented by Silvia Poppovic was broadcast. At 7:15 pm, the telenovela Perdidos de Amor starts airing. On December 31, 1996, the Torre TV Bandeirantes in São Paulo was opened, and it gained widespread popularity for being the tallest television tower in Latin America.

==== Continuing expansion of news programming and TV dramas ====
On February 15, 1997, Jornal Bandeirantes changed its name, and was renamed Jornal da Band, having debuted on February 17, 1997 with Paulo Henrique Amorim. That same day, Brasil Urgente premiered, a talk show presented by Wilton Franco. From March to June of the same year, Memória Band was aired, a rerun program in celebration of the network's 30th anniversary, and which was presented by the then newcomer Fabiana Scaranzi.

The third season of production and exhibition of television drama was in the second half of the 1990s, a time of titles such as A Idade da Loba, O Campeão and Serras Azuis, as well as a new version of Meu Pé de Laranja Lima.

==== The FIFA World Cup and the deaths of two great idols ====
In 1998, the Band covered with SBT, CNT, Rede Record, Rede Globo and Rede Manchete the 1998 FIFA World Cup, held in France. On August 24, Clodovil Hernandes debuts the program Clodovil Soft on the network. In the same year, two of the network's greatest idols died. On July 1, former presenter Bolinha, and on October 26, culinary expert Ofélia Ramos Anunciato, who presented Ofélia's Cozinha Maravilhosa hosted in the morning schedules. The latter had its schedule filled by the then-newcomer Dia Dia. At the end of the year, the network airs the special series Contos de Natal, receiving much critical acclaim.

==== The Carnival, more surprises, and the loss of affiliates ====
In 1999, the Band broadcast the parades of the Grupo Especial e de Acesso of the Rio Carnival, replacing Rede Manchete, which was plunged into a serious financial crisis that would culminate in its bankruptcy in the same year. That same year, the decaying sports center was outsourced to Traffic Sports Marketing (then a partner of Sport Club Corinthians Paulista, the Brazilian Football Confederation and FIFA), changing a large part of the channel's cast of journalists (among the news, radio broadcaster Milton Neves with the program Supertechnical. former basketball players Hortência and Fernando Vanucci - who until then was on Rede Globo) and guaranteeing some future events, such as the Sydney Olympics in 2000, the 2002 World Cup qualifiers, and the first Club World Cup organized by FIFA - the latter exclusively. The partnership brought Sabrina Parlatore in charge of the talk show Geral, during Show do Esporte produced by the Traffic Group. In June, the series A Guerra dos Pintos and Santo de Casa premiered, produced by Bandeirantes in partnership with Columbia TriStar International Television, being the Brazilian versions of the American series Married... with Children and Who's the Boss?, respectively. In the same year, the station announced a partnership with the Government of the State of São Paulo to insert advertising relating to public transport in the capital. In October of the same year, Luciano Huck left the station and signed with TV Globo to host Caldeirão do Huck. With the departure of Luciano, Programa H is presented by Otaviano Costa, and in 2002, it changes its name to O+. By the end of 1999, Márcia Peltier was chosen by Bandeirantes to anchor the broadcast that the network did in the new year, live from Copacabana Beach in Rio de Janeiro.

From 1999 to 2002, the network begins to lose the first affiliates of the 1980s to Rede Record and SBT, but gains almost the same amount as the recent affiliates, to absolve those that were lost. This was due to the quality of the station's programming, which began to decline in the late 1990s.

=== 2000s ===
==== Peak ratings and new sports programs ====
On January 14, 2000, with the transmission of the FIFA Club World Cup final, direct from Maracanã Stadium, between Vasco and Corinthians, the station achieved the highest audience in its history to date: 53 points, taking the absolute leadership from IBOPE. In the same year, using the partnership with Traffic, the station acquired the rights to cover the Copa Libertadores. On March 20, Esporte Agora, a sports news broadcast at night, premiered, and in August, Band Kids premiered, with the exhibition of Japanese anime. The following month, it broadcast the 2000 Summer Olympics in Sydney, together with Rede Globo, ESPN Brasil and SporTV.

==== Program renewals ====
As of June 4, 2001, there have been several renewals to the network's programming. Between 2001 and 2005, the afternoon variety show, Melhor da Tarde, aired from 1 pm to 3 pm, only for the city of São Paulo, and from 3 pm to 4:30 pm, on national television. Soon after, Hora da Verdade aired, with Márcia Goldschmidt. On the same day, Dia Dia is presented by Olga Bongiovanni. Rede Bandeirantes also tried to hire Lilian Witte Fibe.

== Controversy ==
=== Political propaganda allegations during the 1996 elections ===
On October 3, 1996, the São Paulo Regional Labor Court suspended TV Bandeirantes in São Paulo for three hours for disrespecting the electoral law when it carried out alleged political propaganda in the Eleições 96 program. The station was taken off the air at 5:35 pm. The initial punishment was for 24 hours. The director of the station appealed, and the TRE reduced the punishment length to three hours, without prejudice to the continuity of the process. Bandeirantes returned to the air at 8:35pm.

=== Departure of Amaury Jr. and the court case with Rede Record ===
On September 28, 2001, after staying for 15 years hosting the show Flash, Amaury Jr. announces in a press release his departure from Rede Bandeirantes. He stated that his departure was due to disagreements with the broadcaster's commercial department and disagreement with the show's airtime. The following month, he is hired by Rede Record, where he re-released Flash on November 19. However, Rede Bandeirantes took legal action against Amaury, preventing him from working in "television media" until the end of March 2002. His penalty was to be a daily fine of 15 minimum wages. It also went to court against Rede Record and Amaury for using the name Flash.

== See also ==
- Torre TV Bandeirantes, a lattice tower in São Paulo transmitting Band's television and radio stations
- BandNews TV, a cable and satellite news channel
- BandSports, an all-sports cable and satellite network
