= José Carlos Araújo (radio broadcaster) =

Brazilian sports broadcaster

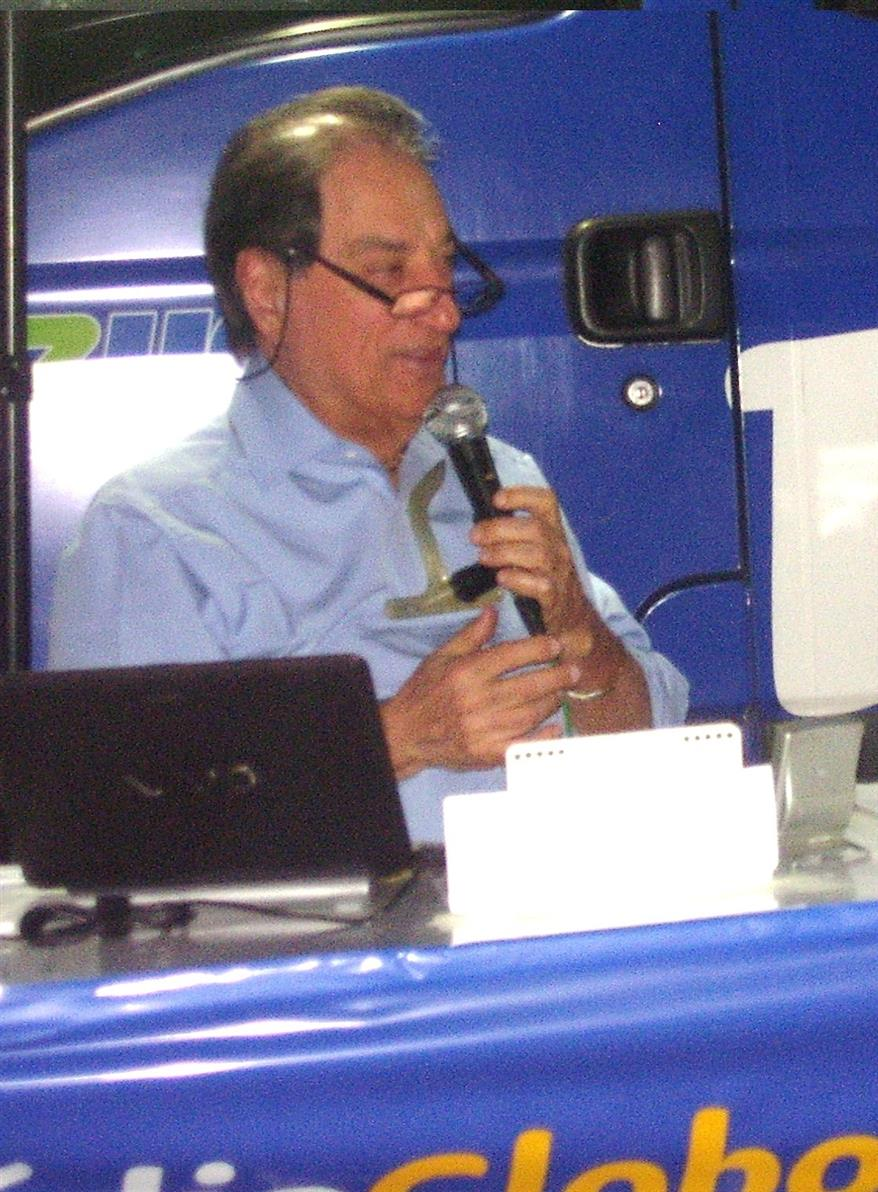
- Born: José Carlos Lopes de Araújo; May 7, 1940 (age 86); Rio de Janeiro, Rio de Janeiro, Brazil
- Other name: Garotinho
- Citizenship: Brazilian
- Education: Rio de Janeiro State University (UERJ)
- Occupations: Radio broadcaster Television presenter Geographer; Teacher
- Notable work: Radio Rádio Globo (1964–1977 and 1984–2012); Rádio Nacional (1977–1984); Bradesco Esportes FM (2012–2013); BandNews FM (2012–2013); Transamérica do Rio de Janeiro (2013–2015); Super Rádio Tupi (2015–present); Antena 1 Rio (2019–2021); NovaBrasil FM Rio (2022–present); TV; TVE Brasil (1987–1995); CNT (1995–2007); Band Rio (2007–2014) SBT Rio (2014–2018)

José Carlos Lopes de Araújo (born May 7, 1940), also known as Garotinho, is a Brazilian sports broadcaster and television host. Well known for his work at radio stations in Rio de Janeiro, he is also a professor and geographer who graduated from the Rio de Janeiro State University (UERJ).

== Biography ==
=== Early years and education ===
Born in the city of Rio de Janeiro, even as a child he would call table soccer games in the Vila Isabel neighborhood, in the city's Rio de Janeiro. By the age of 14, he was already hosting programs on Rádio Roquette Pinto. He attended elementary and high school at Colégio Pedro II, a traditional public school in the city of Rio de Janeiro. He earned a degree in geography from the Rio de Janeiro State University (UERJ).

His background in geography and his work as a teacher provided him with a profession that allowed him to support himself financially while balancing his school classes with his work as a radio broadcaster until he became financially established in radio. José Carlos also notes that many of the phrases he used on the radio during game broadcasts stemmed from his interactions with his students.

=== Career ===
Araújo joined Rádio Globo in the 1960s and remained there until 1976, when he moved to Rádio Nacional. After seven years, on December 1, 1984, he returned to Rádio Globo. As a television host, José Carlos Araújo hosted the program Mesa Redonda Rio on TVE Brasil and Central Nacional de Televisão for 20 years, before the show went off the air in 2007. He then went on to host Jogo Aberto Rio and, subsequently, Os Donos da Bola on Band Rio until the start of the 2014 FIFA World Cup, hosted by Brazil. On August 25, he will make his debut on SBT Rio in the sports segment of the news program hosted by Isabele Benito.

In 2012, after 28 consecutive years (and 42 in total, counting both stints), at the age of 72, Garotinho left Rádio Globo, where he had been commentating on games and hosting the program Globo Esportivo in Rio de Janeiro. He made his farewell appearance during the 2012 Carioca Championship final, when he called the first half of the match and passed the baton to his replacement, Luiz Penido, at halftime of the “Vovô” derby.

Garotinho moved to Bradesco Esportes FM and BandNews FM Rio de Janeiro, where he provided play-by-play commentary for Rio de Janeiro teams’ games, in addition to hosting, from 10:30 a.m. to 11:00 a.m., the Jornal Band News Rio 1st Edition and the first edition of Nossa Área on the sports station from 11:15 a.m. to 12:00 p.m., following Jorge Eduardo's segment. In February 2014, Garotinho and his team led the soccer coverage at Transamérica in Rio de Janeiro until May 2015. In September 2014, SBT Rio announced the hiring of Garotinho to provide commentary on everything happening in the world of football on the city's newscast. In November, José Carlos, along with Gérson, Gilson Ricardo, and Dé Aranha, were given their own sports program, SBT Esporte Rio. On February 1, 2019, he, along with Gérson and Gilson, left SBT Rio. That same year, he began hosting the Minuto do Esporte sports reports, airing twice daily from Monday through Saturday on Antena 1 Rio de Janeiro.

On April 27, 2015, he signed with Super Rádio Tupi, taking Gérson and Gilson Ricardo with him as well. On March 14, 2022, he debuted on NovaBrasil FM with the daily program Resenha Nova, the result of the station's partnership with Tupi, where part of the radio station's staff hosts programs on the sister station and the two form a network for sports broadcasts. In 2023, he launched the podcast Cheguei, which airs on YouTube. His first guest was Romário. He currently continues to call games on Super Rádio Tupi.

== Personal life ==
Garotinho is an R/2 Reserve Officer in the Brazilian Army (EB), having graduated from the Reserve Officer Training Program, and is a paratrooper. He is an avowed Fluminense FC fan. He has been married to the artist Deise Mazziotti since 1970. The couple had three children. He identifies as Catholic.

=== Issue involving Anthony Garotinho ===
As a result of using the nickname "Garotinho", a feud between José Carlos Araújo and the politician Anthony Garotinho began; however, the politician's involvement in legal scandals led to public confusion and personal harassment of the commentator. José Carlos Araújo had already been using the well-known nickname “Garotinho” professionally on Rio de Janeiro radio since the 1950s. Years later, politician Anthony Garotinho (born Anthony William Matheus de Oliveira) began his radio career in Campos dos Goytacazes by imitating the announcer and adopted the same nickname. When Anthony entered politics, the matter turned into a lengthy legal battle.
