= Rede OM Brasil =

- Type: Free-to-air television network
- Country: Brazil
- Stations: List: TV Paraná; TV Tropical
- Headquarters: Curitiba, Paraná, Brazil

Programming
- Language: Portuguese

Ownership
- Owner: Organizações Martinez (Rádio e Televisão OM Ltda.)
- Key people: José Carlos Martinez

History
- Launched: May 1982
- Closed: May 22, 1993

Rede OM Brasil (Organizações Martinez) was a Brazilian nationwide (initially statewide) television network. Emerging in the 1980s, the network became the first to be headquartered outside of the Rio-São Paulo axis. Its founder was the politician and businessman, José Carlos Martinez.

The network shut down on May 22, 1993, and was replaced by Central Nacional de Televisão (CNT).

== History ==
=== Background ===
On March 15, 1979, VHF channel 7 in Londrina was activated, with the start of TV Tropical. The Martinez family's station soon signed a contract to retransmit Rede Globo's programming throughout the north and northwest region of Paraná (in addition to some cities in the south of São Paulo). It lasted until December 1 of the same year after being affiliated with the newly created Rede Bandeirantes (Globo went on to TV Coroados, channel 3, where it is still affiliated).

In its early years, the station achieved the highest audience ratings in the region with Jornal do Meio-Dia (the broadcaster's traditional news program) which covered a wide range of subjects such as culture, varieties, musicals, live interviews, documentaries. One of these was a factual news and police journalism program Cadeia.

At the end of the 1970s, Diários Associados went into crisis with the closure of Rede Tupi. By mutual agreement, the group and the Stesser Family decide to put TV Paraná in Curitiba up for sale. After intense negotiations, the Martinez family acquired the station that will be home to the state's newest state television network.

With the acquisition of TV Paraná, Curitiba became the network head due to geographical conditions. The partnership with TV Bandeirantes expanded throughout the state, becoming one of Band's main affiliates.

=== Rede OM ===
In 1982, OM stood out for its political coverage such as political debates for the government of Paraná.

OM invested in motorsport by creating the Pole Position program. Another important program for the sports department was Telesporte.

Partnership with TV Bandeirantes ended in 1991. That same year, as an act of friendship to Dante Matiussi and Airton Trevisan, the network decided to affiliate to Rede Record, to establish itself as a new national network. Popular programs included Cadeia, Programa do Ratinho by Carlos Massa and the sports broadcasts of Compeonato Paranaense.

=== Rede OM Brasil ===
In late 1991, Rede OM (formed, at the time, by TV Paraná and TV Tropical) filed a request for satellite transmission with EMBRATEL starting 1992.

On November 20, 1991, a contract was signed with TV Gazeta from São Paulo (owned by Fundação Cásper Líbero). OM's programming was shown on the São Paulo channel only on February 15, 1992. On Sundays, the São Paulo station would continue showing Japan Pop Show. On Saturdays, the program was shown at 9:00 am on Rede OM.

On February 28, 1992, OM purchased TV Corcovado, channel 9 in Rio de Janeiro for an estimated sum of US$8 million.

On April 1, Galvão Bueno debuted on the station as presenter and director on Libertadores Cup of America, leaving TV Globo after almost ten years.

Approximately US$30 million was spent on implementing the network alone. Flávio Martinez became the general superintendent of the network.

A package of more than 100 films was purchased with most of them being fighting movies or softcore porn. Among the titles were Wild Orchid, Forceful Impact and Caligula. Telenovelas were also broadcast on the network and some caused controversy, such as the Argentine version of Irmãos Coragem, Mi nombre es Coraje.

=== Premiere ===
The network debuted its new national schedule on March 30, 1992. The network gave total freedom to affiliates to produce their programming to air 6pm to midnight. The exception was in Rio de Janeiro, which relayed the Curitiba station from 8am to 2am.

The new program featured two soap operas: El árbol azul and Manuela, an Italian-American super production written by the Brazilian Manoel Carlos and starring the actress Grecia Colmenares.

The flagship news program was Fala Brasil (unrelated to Record's morning news program of the same name), a weekly news magazine produced in the Curitiba studios and presented by Carlos Marassi and Valéria Balbi. The program featured national and international columnists, including singer Aguinaldo Timóteo and economist Luis Nassif, as well as comments from Galvão Bueno on sport. It also included the controversial police program Cadeia (local edition at 12:55pm and national edition at 6:15pm), presented by radio host and then state deputy Luiz Carlos Alborghetti.

Pilot Ayrton Senna took part in Pódium. The network broadcast the Paris-Dakar Rally in a program with sports commentator José Carlos Araújo, the wrestling program Campeões do Ringue and on Saturdays, Campeonato Paranaense as well as that year's Copa do Brasil.

Other programs include: Ser Tão...Brasileiro, with Tamara Taxman (later presented by Jair Rodrigues), Blue Jeans, with Jimy Raw and Coçando o Sábado with Leonor Corrêa.

On June 17, 1992, the final of that year's Copa Libertadores between São Paulo and Newell's Old Boys hit OM's largest audience in all of its history: 34 points.

In August, a package of new feature films featuring already established Hollywood actors was announced with movies such as Blood and Sand and The Bodyguard.

=== Controversies ===
On June 20, 1992, OM aired the controversial film Caligula, rated 18+. Judge José Antônio de Andrade Martins of the 18th Federal Court of São Paulo ordered the cancellation of the broadcast through an injunction. Even with the audience reaching an incredible 16 points, the network was forced to take the film off the air.

In August, the CPI of the PC Farias case discovered a connection between PC and Rede OM. Two checks from the “ghost” Manoel Dantas Araújo, had paid a part of the debt that SBT had with Caixa Econômica Federal. This debt would have been transferred to OM in exchange for the TV Corcovado concession.

The scandal contributed to the network's accounting problems along with a small budget after national broadcasting and decreased advertising. Rede OM cut 60% of its expenses and reformulate its entire schedule to escape collapse.

Between August and September, around 100 journalists were fired in the São Paulo office alone. With a 50% cut and strong pressure, the broadcaster's journalism directors Paulo Alceu and Dante Massuti resigned.

Businessman José Carlos Martinez admitted to having received a loan equivalent to US$8.5 million to buy television stations in May of the previous year. In exchange for this loan, Martinez would have given up the title Tribuna de Alagoas so that PC could set up a newspaper in Maceió, denying the accusations that he was the treasurer's front man and thus unaware of the ghost check received to pay for TV Corcovado.

On September 16, the Broadcasters' Union negotiated with the network's management about non-payment of the contract terminations and salary for the month of August. TV Gazeta gave an irrevocable deadline for the network to pay the arrears, which already exceeded the one million dollar mark.

With just eight months of operation, Rede OM had become indebted and involved in controversies. In November, fired employees appealed to the journalists' union after receiving a bad check. Among those affected were presenter Leonor Corrêa and journalist Valéria Balbi.

At the end of 1992, Pluma Equipamentos requested the bankruptcy of Rede OM for non-payment of a debt of Cr$17 thousand.

With the arrival of 1993, Rede OM sold TV Maringá to Grupo JMalucelli. Distributor Paris Filmes threatened to take legal action to auction OM's transmission antenna, telephones and telecine equipment, as a guarantee of payment for the debt. The company was also being sued for not paying commissions to Galvão Bueno and the labor obligations to the dismissed journalists. The network still ranked in fourth place in IBOPE rankings, behind Globo, SBT and Band.

=== Shutdown ===
In April, Rede OM decided to change the name and programming to clean up its image. The presenter Clodovil was hired and TV Gazeta, which previously only rented out the schedules, became an affiliate.

On May 23, 1993, Rede OM closed with Central Nacional de Televisão (CNT) taking its place.

== Network ==
During its existence, the network has had over 30 stations in thirteen Brazilian states. The station's O&Os were TV Paraná and TV Tropical, TV Maringá (currently a Rede Bandeirantes affiliate), TV Corcovado and TV Gazeta (who leased the network). Most of these stations migrated over to CNT.

The following stations were broadcast by the network:

- TV FR Limeira (channel 11, now RFTV)
- TV FR Bauru (channel 4)
- TV Maringá (channel 6)
- RCE TV Criciúma (channel 3)
- RCE TV Vale do Itajaí (channel 10)
- RCE TV Criciúma (channel 9)
- RCE TV Cultura Florianópolis (channel 6)
- TV Pernambuco Caruaru (channel 12)
- TV Carimã Cascavel (channel 10)
