= Golfinho =

Golfinho may refer to:

- Golfinho gas field, a natural gas field in the Indian Ocean off Mozambique
- NRP Golfinho, the name of more than one Portuguese Navy submarine
- TV Golfinho, a Brazilian television station
