= TV Maringá =

TV Maringá (ZYB 406)
- Maringá, Paraná; Brazil
- Channels: Digital: 27 (UHF); Virtual: 6
- Branding: TV Maringá

Programming
- Affiliations: Rede Bandeirantes

Ownership
- Owner: Grupo JMalucelli; (Televisão Icaraí Ltda. TV Maringá Ltda.)
- Sister stations: Tarobá FM Cascavel

History
- First air date: 1988
- Former names: TV Icaraí (1988-1993); Band Maringá (2021-2022)
- Former channel numbers: Analog: 6 (VHF, 1988-2018)
- Former affiliations: Rede OM Brasil (1992-1993)

Technical information
- Licensing authority: ANATEL
- ERP: 0.95 kW
- Transmitter coordinates: 23°26′42″S 51°57′17.4″W

Links
- Public license information: Profile
- Website: bandmaringa.com.br

TV Maringá (channel 6) is a Brazilian television station licensed to Maringá, a city in northern Paraná. Founded in 1988 as TV Icaraí and currently owned by Grupo JMalucelli, the station produced some successful local programs, with the main attraction being Pinga Fogo na TV, which led the ratings in the region. Currently, it prioritizes a local schedule with emphasis on live programming.

== History ==
The station was established in 1988 by politician José Carlos Martinez, who was already the owner of two television stations in the state of Paraná: TV Paraná in Curitiba and TV Tropical in Londrina, both of which being Band affiliates. The station was part of Rede OM, which in 1992, formed the new Rede OM Brasil network. However, OM was facing financial difficulties less than a year after becoming a national network, forcing the sale to Joel Malucelli (of Grupo JMalucelli) on January 4, 1993, causing TV Icaraí to be renamed TV Maringá in the process. Grupo JMalucelli already owned 50% of TV Bandeirantes Paraná in Curitiba.

In 1997, the station started housing Benedito Cláudio de Oliveira, alias "Pinga Fogo" (literally "Dripping Fire", although it also means "provocation"), who ported his radio program to television, airing between 12:30pm and 1:30pm. With the rapid success of Pinga Fogo na TV, he had plans to move his program to SBT, where he would be seen nationwide, with a tentative premiere date set for July 13, 1998, but, ultimately, the plans were shelved due to a commercial agreement with Televisa to supply telenovelas for the network, as well as signing up Ratinho in August. A few years later, Pinga Fogo briefly had a stint on RIC TV Maringá, a Record affiliate, but returned to TV Maringá within a week.

Until 2011, the station was headquartered at Avenida Carlos Gomes, when it was relocated to an up-to-date building at Avenida Carlos Correa Borges. In August 2024, three reporters, one producer and two camera operators were fired by the station.

== Technical information ==
Virtual channel	Digital channel	Screen	Content
6.1	27 UHF	1080i	TV Maringá/Band's main schedule

The station shut down its analog transmitter on VHF channel 6 on November 28, 2018, according to ANATEL's official roadmap.

== Programming ==
In addition to relaying Band's national programming and Bora Paraná from Band Paraná, TV Maringá produces or airs the folloeing programs:

- Agro Band
- Alerta 24h
- Band Cidade
- Band Imóveis
- Brasil Urgente Maringá
- Paraná Notícias
- Programa Beija-Flor na TV
- Tarde na Band
