= List of programs broadcast by Rede CNT =

This is a list of programs broadcast by the Central Nacional de Televisão, more known as Rede CNT and CNT, a Brazilian television network.

== Current programs ==
=== Journalistic shows ===
- CNT Entrevista
- CNT Jornal (1993–present)
- CNT News
- CNT Notícias
- Jogo do Poder (2007-present)

=== Sportive shows ===
- CNT Esporte (2008–present)
- Tempo Extra (2018-present)

=== Varieties and other shows ===
- CNT Variedades
- Programa Marco Brasil
- Terroir Brasileiro
- Familia Zoreia

=== Locals ===
CNT Rio de Janeiro

- Fala Baixada

CNT Londrina

- Cidadão Tropical

CNT Salvador

- Geraldão e o Povo
