= Media in Nova Friburgo =

Nova Friburgo supports a diverse range of radio, television, and newspapers.

== Print ==
=== Newspapers ===
The A Voz Da Serra is the city's primary newspaper, published two Tuesday a Saturday. Other newspapers published in the city include:

- A Voz da serra

=== Online news websites ===
- A Voz Da Serra
- Portal Multiplix
- EcoSerrano

== Radio ==
The following radio stations are licensed to and/or broadcast from Nova Friburgo:

=== AM ===
There's no AM radio stations in Nova Friburgo. But Rádio Nova Friburgo migrated from AM to FM to final of 2020 to 2021.

=== FM ===
- Rádio Nova Friburgo 107.5
- Rádio Sucesso 88.3
- Rádio Comunidade Friburgo 104.9 FM
- Rádio Conselheiro FM 87.7
- Rádio Novo Tempo 90.1 FM
- Rádio Solares FM 99.3

== Television ==
The following is a list of television stations that broadcast from and/or are licensed to Nova Friburgo.

Display Channel	Network	City of License	Notes
3.1	SBT Interior RJ	Nova Friburgo, Rio de Janeiro	-
12	InterTV Serramar	Nova Friburgo, Rio de Janeiro	-
