= Band Paraná =

TV Bandeirantes Paraná (ZYB 400)
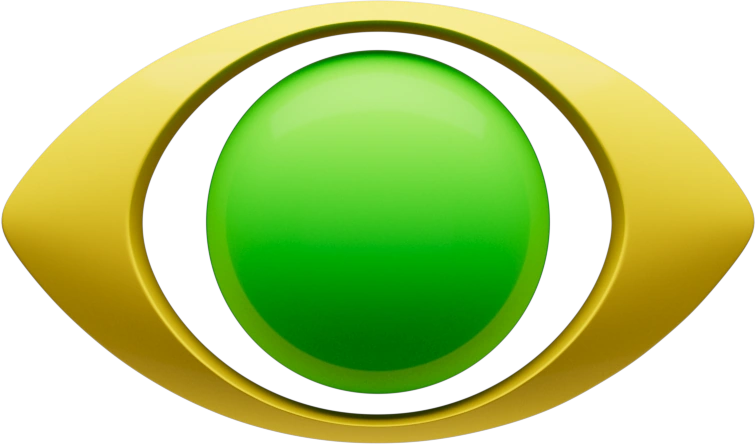
- Curitiba, Paraná; Brazil
- Channels: Digital: 38 (UHF); Virtual: 2
- Branding: Band Paraná

Programming
- Affiliations: Rede Bandeirantes

Ownership
- Owner: Grupo Bandeirantes de Comunicação (55%) Grupo JMalucelli (45%); (Televisão Bandeirantes do Paraná Ltda.)

History
- First air date: July 22, 1982
- Former names: TV Curitiba (1982-1991); Band Curitiba (1991-2018)
- Former channel numbers: Analog: 2 (VHF, 1982-2018)
- Former affiliations: Rede Manchete (1984-1987)

Technical information
- Licensing authority: ANATEL
- ERP: 6,8 kW
- Transmitter coordinates: 25°23′59″S 49°17′16.4″W

Links
- Public license information: Profile
- Website: bandparana.com.br

Band Paraná (channel 2) is a Band-owned-and-operated station licensed to Curitiba, Paraná, owned by Grupo Bandeirantes in association with Grupo JMalucelli.

== History ==
The concession for the fourth television station in Curitiba was granted by president João Figueiredo on October 24, 1979, after public competition, to a condominium between Grupo Bandeirantes de Comunicação and businessman João Milanez, owner of TV Tarobá of Cascavel. USince Band already had TV Paraná, owned by Organizações Martinez, as its affiliate, the network decided to continue with the partnership and signed a special agreement for the use of its facilities, in particular, for a transmitter prepared for use only on VHF channel 2. This led the owners to question DENTEL the change of the station's technical characteristics, which were originally approved for VHF channel 9 (which, in turn, was only used from 1987 for the current TV Paraná Turismo).

TV Curitiba launched on July 22, 1982, at 7pm, with a cocktail for several guests at Buffet Cormoran, among them, authority figures such as Ney Braga, who, alongside João Milanez, cut the founding ribbon, mayor Jaime Lerner, governor José Hosken de Novais, minister of communications Euclides Quandt de Oliveira, as well as federal and state deputees. The station started with an independent schedule, with some leftovers from Band's schedule and educational programs produced by TV Cultura and TVE. In April 1984, it started relaying Rede Manchete's schedule, which lasted until July 13, 1986, when the network moved to TV Independência, while TV Curitiba returned to its independent programming the following day.

In 1990, Milanez sold his shares at TV Curitiba to businessman Joel Malucelli, owner of Grupo JMalucelli. The new management promoted several changes to the station, such as the construction of its own studios, ending its condition as a tenant of TV Paraná. With the end of the contract between Band and TV Paraná, which moved to Rede Record, TV Curitiba officially became an owned-and-operated station on June 2, 1991, becoming TV Bandeirantes Curitiba.

The station began rebroadcasting the new programming from the early hours of the day, simultaneously with channel 6, but its official debut took place at 9pm, with a rerun of the program Crítica & Autocritica, which had as a guest the then governor of Paraná Roberto Requião. The interview had been shown a week earlier by Band, but was censored by its former affiliate due to political disagreements between Requião and its owner, José Carlos Martinez. That same week, on June 7, the station inaugurated its own headquarters in the Pilarzinho neighborhood.

The station was renamed Band Paraná on June 19, 2019.

== Technical information ==
Virtual channel	Digital channel	Screen	Content
2.1	38 UHF	1080i	Band Paraná/Band's main schedule
