= Record Paulista =

Bauru, São Paulo; Brazil
- Channels: Digital: 27 (UHF); Virtual: 4

Programming
- Affiliations: Record

Ownership
- Owner: Grupo Record; (TV Cidade de Bauru Ltda.)

History
- First air date: August 1, 1992
- Former names: TV FR (1992–1994); TV São Paulo Centro (1994–1999); TV Record Regional Bauru (1999–2008); TV Record Paulista (2008–2016); RecordTV Paulista (2016–2023)
- Former channel numbers: Analog: 4 (VHF, 1992–2018)
- Former affiliations: Rede OM Brasil (1992); Rede Manchete (1992–1994); Rede Bandeirantes (1994–1999)

Technical information
- Licensing authority: ANATEL
- ERP: 2.2 kW
- Transmitter coordinates: 22°21′36.7″S 49°05′57.2″W

Links
- Public license information: Profile
- Website: recordpaulista.com.br

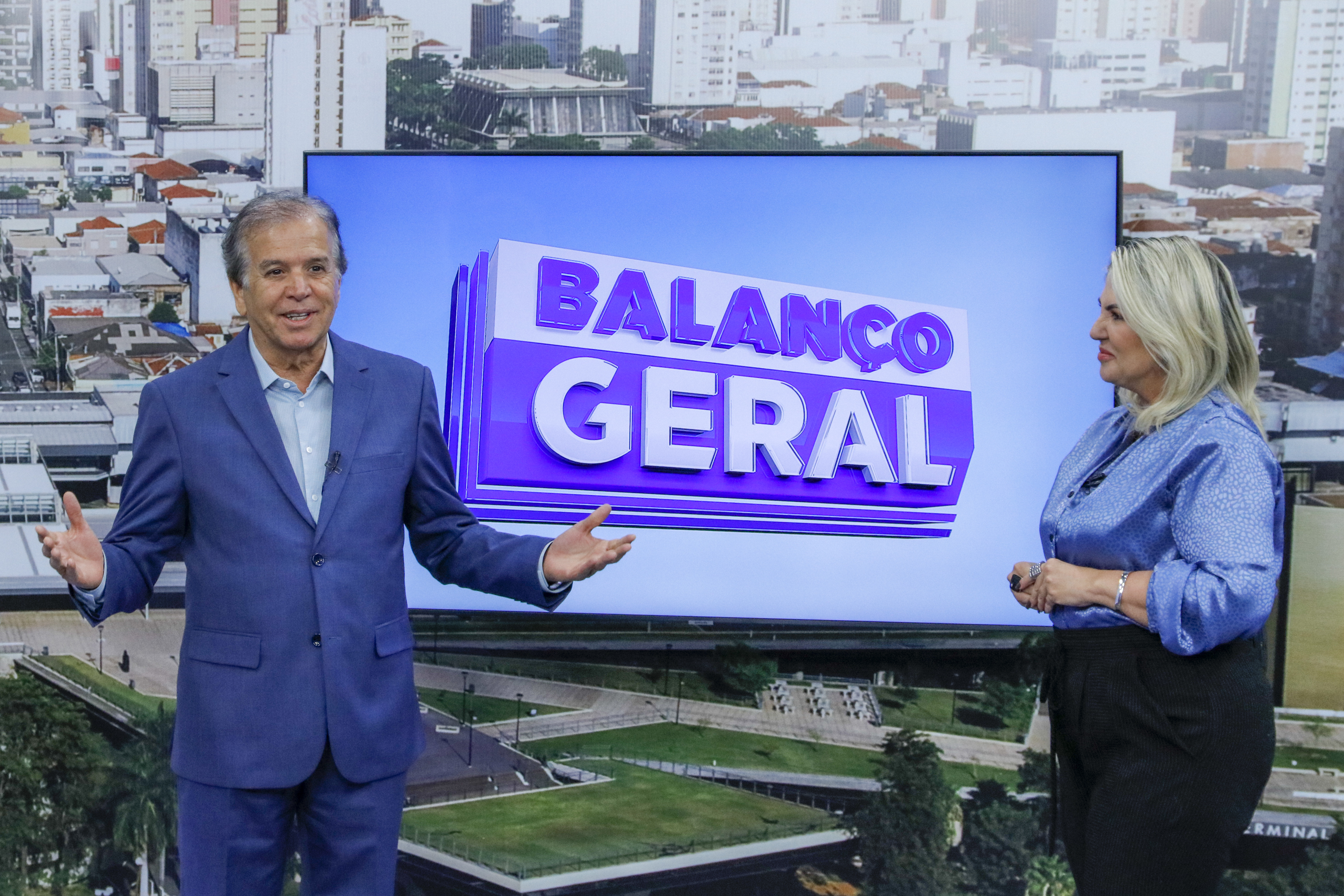
Set of the local Balanço Geral

Record Paulista (channel 4) is a Brazilian television station located in Bauru, as a Record affiliate for 110 municipalities in the regions of Bauru, Marília and Sorocaba.

== History ==
=== Background ===
During his mandate as federal deputee, politician Fausto Rocha gained three licenses to operate television stations in the municipalities of Limeira, Campinas and Bauru. On March 30, 1988, decree nº 91.881 of March 29 is published on Diário Oficial da União, launching a public contest for the licenses. On April 20, the Ministry of Communications granted the licenses to Fausto Rocha, after winning the bid. Already in 1990, the premises of the future TV FR began to be built, which would generate its signals from Limeira, while Campinas would house the studios of the upcoming productions that would be sent to Limeira via microwave, while Bauru had its own line-up.

=== TV FR (1992–1994) ===
On August 1, 1992, TV FR in Bauru started broadcasting, having Rede OM Brasil (predecessor CNT, of José Carlos Martinez) as its affiliate. Initially, its line-up consisted of FR Debate, shown at 12 pm, and later recorded at 10:30 am. In the program, three journalists met to discuss the day's events. Professionals such as Jair Aceituno, Ricardo Pesci, Fred Calmon, Márcio ABC and Marcos Lopes took turns presenting. Then, FR Esportes was shown, with highlights from the sports area, and in the evening, FR Notícias was shown, at 7 pm. On Sundays, at 9 pm, news and variety programs closed the schedule.

Between August and September 1992, in the midst of Martinez's involvement with the corruption schemes of then-president Fernando Collor, Fausto Rocha decided to cut the support to Collor, voting in favor of the removal of the then president in the Chamber of Deputies, and announces that TV FR will change its affiliation, breaking the contract signed months earlier with Rede OM Brasil. In late September, the station became an affiliate of Rede Manchete.

In 1993, one of the station's biggest successes of the year was the independent program Zapteen, presented by journalist Diane Damiatti and created by production company TBR Produções para TV. The program began in January, as a four-minute commercial break on Saturdays. It was so popular with young audiences that its duration gradually increased, reaching 30 minutes on Saturday mornings. The agenda was based on themes related to young people, cultural agenda and interviews. Despite its success, the program was axed in September of the same year.

In September 1993, without being able to finance the station due to the distance between the other stations in Campinas and Limeira, where his family lived, Fausto Rocha announced the sale of TV FR. At the end of the year, the video production company Lead Comunicação, owned by Kleber Santos, joins forces with Airton Caseiro and other investors and establishes SP Centro Comunicação Ltda. After negotiating the purchase of the broadcaster, the group assumes full control of TV FR.

=== TV São Paulo Centro (1994–1999) ===
In early 1994, the group changes the name of the station to TV São Paulo Centro. After the change, the contract with Rede Manchete is broken and the station became a Rede Bandeirantes affiliate. In its new phase, the station was notable for investing massively in local news. Initially, the station showed a daily news program from 12 pm to 12:30 pm, in addition to a second edition, which showed a summary of the news, as well as an edited and summarized version of the morning news program's studio interviews. On Saturdays, only the second edition was shown. At that time, both news programs were not shown live. The broadcaster even hired seven video editors, who finalized the material produced by six reporting teams.

The newscasts had in their editorial line the objective of valuing regional issues through the content of the information, with no space for the provision of services or community participation. When a controversial issue was on the agenda, the editors asked reporters to do a Fala Povo to show its impact. In addition to the news, programs such as Linha de Frente were produced, presented by Gerson de Souza, with the assistance of Adauto Nascimento in capturing images, and shown on Friday nights at 10 pm. The program was based on investigative journalism and denunciations, in the style of the already known Documento Especial. Gerson also presented Segunda Sem Censura, whose objective was to denounce the disregard for the community's problems.

In 1995, Câmera Aberta premiered, an interview program with artists and singers, presented by Kleber Santos. Within the program, tips on cinema and reading, aesthetics and health were presented, in addition to the cultural agenda. Productions such as SP Shopping, a sales program that initially only advertised the stores that are part of Bauru Shopping, and Gente que Happen, a social columnist program presented by Milton Júnior, were also aired.

TV São Paulo Centro also stood out in covering political events in the region, presenting in 1996, a series of eleven debates with all the candidates for mayor of the municipalities in its area of coverage, some of the cities included in the initiative (Botucatu, São Manuel, Avaré, Lençóis Paulista, in addition to Bauru). The debates were shown live on Friday nights, and those that had previously been recorded were shown on Saturday mornings.

The station also produced a series of specials about the region's tourist and economic potential, which were shown on Saturdays, at noon, lasting 30 minutes. The broadcaster also focused on coverage of events in the region, such as Prêmio Atenção, Prêmio Qualidade Brasil, Grand Expo Bauru, for example. The station even produced the videos shown at the parties, in addition to providing live and compact coverage with interviews and the best moments.

However, TV São Paulo Centro begins the year 1998 with several difficulties. Several problems, such as the high cost of local productions, the extensive salary payroll, the exclusivity of the commercial department in using the only editing island in Betamax for its productions, in addition to the equipment that was already obsolete and used since the TV FR days (the station still used U-matic recording equipment), began to make the operation of the station unfeasible, which was put up for sale.

In late 1998, the station is sold to Grupo Record, of the businessman and leader of the Universal Church of the Kingdom of God, Edir Macedo, who took on the station's physical premises, still in transitional character, maintaining its Band affiliation and the old administration. From then on, investment was made in the production of news and programs related to the Universal Church.

=== Record O&O (since 1999) ===
On April 13, 1999, TV São Paulo Centro was renamed TV Record Bauru, becoming a Rede Record-owned-and-operated station. The announcement of the new station was made alongside the acquisition of Rede Mulher. Years later, TV Record Bauru increased its coverage area to 117 municipalities, corresponding to around 2,5 million people, when it went through a process of growth in audience and signal, and opened a branch in Marília, for the production of reports.

In its new phase, the station began to invest in journalism, producing programs such as Record Cidade, a news program shown in the evening slot, and the journalistic Record Urgente, which showed police stories, being shown from Monday to Friday from 12 pm to 1 pm. Years later, following a standardization of Record's local news programs, Record Cidade was replaced by Informe São Paulo. Among the entertainment and independent programs, the most notable were Utopia, with a youth theme; Viver Bem, with aesthetic tips (produced in Marília), and Radio Clip, which showed interviews with musical personalities from the region.

In 2007, the station started airing a local edition of the morning magazine program Tudo a Ver, presented by Fabiane Berto, which ended in 2008. In October 2008, the station was renamed TV Record Paulista, due to the amplitude of the signal outside Bauru and the region and also due to the process of reorganization of the network's own stations.

In 2009, the program Em Alta com Alex Ruivo, previously shown since 2007 on TV Sorocaba, was transferred to TV Record Paulista at the station's request. The program left the station in 2011, when it started to be produced by A2 Comunicação and shown on national television through Record News. In the same year, the station debuted Pergunte ao Doutor, presented by Dr. José Eduardo Marques, based on the segment shown nationally by Record, but shortly afterwards it was cancelled. On November 24, 2016, with the reformulation of the network's brand, the station was renamed RecordTV Paulista.

On March 15, 2021, due to financial problems, the station cancelled its news bulletin, SP Record, firing most of the production team. Thaísa Barcelos, who was the news anchor, started to present a news block within Balanço Geral.

On November 6, 2023, in line with the introduction of Record's new logo and name (from RecordTV to Record), the station was renamed Record Paulista.

== Technical information ==
Channel	Video	Aspect	Short name	Programming
4.1	1080i	16:9	Record	Main Record Paulista programming / Record

The station started its digital broadcasts on March 14, 2012, becoming the third station in Bauru to use this technology.

Analog broadcasts on VHF channel 4 ended on March 28, 2018, according to the official ANATEL roadmap.
