= SBT Rio =

SBT Rio (ZYB 512)
- Rio de Janeiro; Brazil
- Channels: Digital: 24 (UHF); Virtual: 11

Programming
- Affiliations: SBT

Ownership
- Owner: Grupo Silvio Santos; (TVSBT Canal 11 do Rio de Janeiro Ltda.)

History
- First air date: 14 May 1976
- Former names: TVS Rio de Janeiro (1976-1990); SBT Rio de Janeiro (1990-2012)
- Former channel numbers: Analog: 11 (VHF, 1976–2017)
- Former affiliations: REI (1976-1981)

Technical information
- Licensing authority: ANATEL
- ERP: 8.5 kW
- Transmitter coordinates: 22°56′59.4″S 43°13′46.6″W

Links
- Public license information: Profile
- Website: www.sbt.com.br

SBT Rio (channel 11) is a Brazilian television station located in the city of Rio de Janeiro, capital of the state of the same name, serving as an owned-and-operated station of Sistema Brasileiro de Televisão for the Rio de Janeiro metropolitan area. The station has its facilities located in the Charles de Gaulle Business Center, in the Castelo region, downtown Rio de Janeiro, on the outskirts of Santos Dumont Airport, and its transmitters are at the top of Morro do Sumaré, in the Rio Comprido neighborhood.

The broadcaster went on air on 14 May 1976, under the name TVS, and was a (probable) member of Record and REI until 1981, being the first TV concession acquired by businessman Silvio Santos, five years before the Silvio Santos Group acquired part of Rede Tupi's concessions and forming the national network that would become SBT.

== History ==
In 1975, comedian Manuel de Nóbrega convinced businessman and presenter Silvio Santos to participate in a Federal Government bid for the concession of VHF channel 11 in Rio de Janeiro, a bid that was won by the businessman, and the first TV concession granted to a television artist. In the same year, the future broadcaster acquired an old refrigerated warehouse located at Rua General Padilha, 134, in São Cristóvão, where the first studios for channel 11 were set up. The following year, Silvio participated in an auction of the bankrupt estate of TV Continental, completing the station's old radiating system. Despite being based in Rio de Janeiro, its main facilities would be located in São Paulo, where the Silvio Santos Group maintained a 4,000 m^{2} complex that belonged to the defunct TV Excelsior in the Vila Guilherme neighborhood, in addition to the Manuel de Nóbrega Theater, in Pompeia, where Silvio did his programs. The latter's name was given in honor of the comedian, who died on 17 March 1976, during preparations for the inauguration of TVS, and would be its future director, causing Silvio to hand over the position to Luciano Callegari. In total, at least 60 million cruzeiros were invested in the future broadcaster.

TVS (short for TV Studios, or TV Studios Silvio Santos) was inaugurated on the night of 14 May 1976, at 9 pm. Initially, in addition to programs hosted by Silvio Santos himself and other presenters, the station's programming, which aired daily from 6pm until midnight, consisted of several series, cartoons and films, which were exhaustively shown more than once a day to fill the schedules. It was only on 1 June 1977, that the schedule began to diversify, through the showing of telenovelas, small news programs and other content. That same day, TVS inaugurated a new tower and transmitter, with an effective power of 270 kW, which increased the quality of the signal and its coverage.

In 1978, the Manuel de Nóbrega Theater suffered a fire in São Paulo, causing Silvio Santos to transfer the production of the Silvio Santos Program to the location where the old Cine Sol operated, in the Carandiru neighborhood. In 1979, TVS purchased the old Cine Fluminense, in front of Campo de São Cristóvão, which, after a series of renovations, was adapted for television and opened in 1982, also serving to house TV Record. The old warehouse on Rua General Padilha continued to house TVS until the end of the 80s, when it became exclusively owned by channel 9.

In September 1980, Silvio Santos and Adolpho Bloch participated in the competition opened on 23 July for the concessions of Rede Tupi and TV Excelsior in São Paulo. Silvio wins the concessions of Rede Tupi in the cities of São Paulo (TV Tupi São Paulo), Porto Alegre (TV Piratini) and Belém (TV Marajoara), in addition to channel 9 in Rio de Janeiro, which was owned by the extinct TV Continental and became be TV Record. On 19 August 1981, five years after the founding of TVS Rio de Janeiro, the Brazilian Television System (SBT) was created, formed by broadcasters from São Paulo, Rio de Janeiro, Porto Alegre and Belém (the latter two entering the air later) and a number of affiliates. The new network started to be headed from São Paulo, adding to the existing structure that was now TVS Rio de Janeiro.

In late 1982, TVS did a mutual exchange of headquarters between TV Record Rio de Janeiro (part-owned by Silvio Santos at the time), which, since April that year, operated in the building of the former Cinema Fluminense, in front of Campo de São Cristóvão, and moved to General Padilha Street. The decision was taken as TV Record's building was seen as more appropriate for TVS to do its recordings.

Channel 11 and SBT's other owned-and-operated stations continued to use the TVS brand locally until 1990, when they definitively started using only the SBT brand — in Rio's case, SBT Rio de Janeiro. On August 19, 2012, on the date of the network's 31st anniversary, the name was simplified to just SBT Rio. On 5 November, its programming was now transmitted statewide, through SBT Interior RJ (from Nova Friburgo). With this, SBT Rio became the state hub.

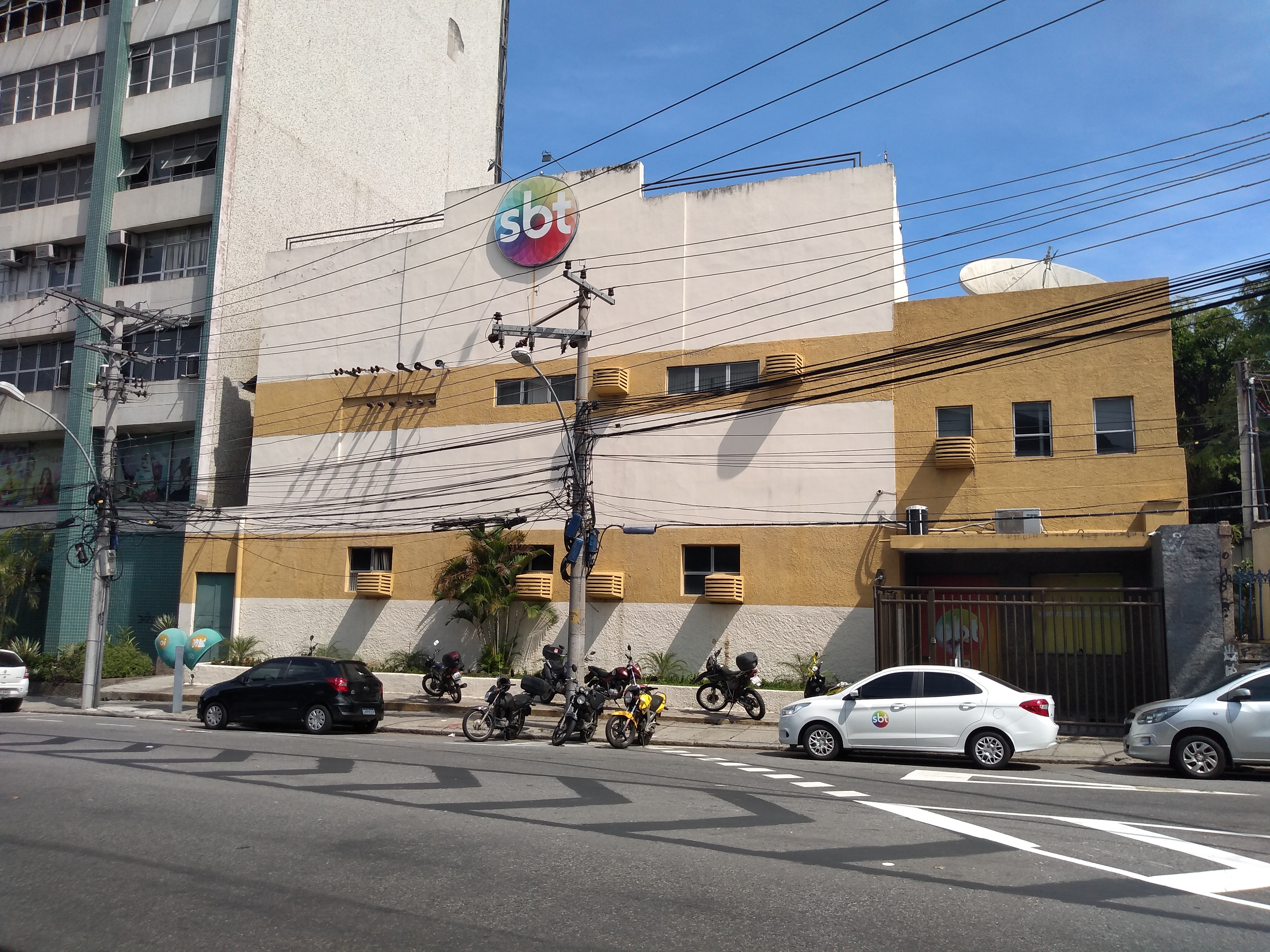
Building where SBT Rio operated, in the São Cristóvão neighborhood, between 1982 and 2020

Analog signals on VHF channel 11 shut down on 22 November 2017, following the official ANATEL roadmap.

In February 2020, SBT Rio announced that it would move its offices to Centro Empresarial Charles de Gaulle, in the Castelo neighborhood downtown. The R$8 million investment was made following structural problems at the existing Campo de São Cristóvão studios, which showed leaks and cracks. After the pandemic delayed the process, the new building was inaugurated on 19 August 2021, the date of the network's fortieth anniversary. Once at the new facilities, the administrative and commercial sectors that were at the former building, were also relocated, while local program production only relocated a month later, on 20 September.

== Technical information ==
Virtual channel	Digital channel	Aspect ratio	Content
11.1	24 UHF	1080i	SBT Rio/SBT programming

Based on the federal decree on the transition of Brazilian TV stations from analogue to digital signals, SBT Rio, as well as other stations in the city of Rio de Janeiro, ceased broadcasting on channel 11 VHF on 22 November 2017, following the official ANATEL roadmap. The signal was cut off at 11:59 pm, during Programa do Ratinho, and was replaced by a warning from MCTIC and ANATEL about the switch-off.

== Programs ==
In addition to relaying SBT's national programming, SBT Rio produces the following programs:

- SBT Rio: News, with Isabele Benito;
- SBT Sports Rio: Sports news, com Fernanda Maia;
- SBT Rio 2° Edição: news, with Lívia Mendonça;
- Cariocou: Variety show, com Rafael Paiva and Pri Borges;

=== News ===
In order to comply with legislation on the mandatory minimum of 5% journalism in programming, TVS initially aired a newsletter called Plantão 11, with several short editions throughout the day, and also the program Por Dentro do Lance, which it was a short sports commentary. Only from 1980 onwards, with an expansion of programming, greater investments began to be made in journalism, with the creation of Jornal da Manhã, shown at 8am. The following year, the news program was moved to midnight and its title was changed to Jornal da Noite.

From 1984 onwards, TVS Rio de Janeiro had Jornal da Cidade as its local newsletter, which aired in the early evening, in addition to local blocks of the news programs Noticentro and Jornal 24 Horas. In 1986, SBT decided to create a new standard of local journalism and implemented the news program Cidade on its stations, while in Rio de Janeiro, TVS showed Cidade 11, presented by Ana Davis and Paulo Carvalho. In 1989, Cidade 11 was replaced by TJ Rio, the local version of TJ Brasil. The news program aired for the last time on 18 May 1991, giving way to the news program Aqui Agora, broadcast nationally by SBT. In 1992, after the end of the 1992 Summer Olympics, the network debuted the morning program Agenda, presented by Leda Nagle. The program was based on interviews and aired until the mid-1990s.

After the extinction of Agenda, SBT Rio de Janeiro began to act almost as a mere rebroadcaster of SBT, without showing any local attractions. This changed on 1 December 1999, when in an effort to reactivate journalism on its own stations, the news program SBT Rio, presented by Renata Affonso, and the weekly Câmera em Ação, now off the air, debuted. In its first years, SBT Rio managed to create balanced competition with RJTV from TV Globo Rio de Janeiro, due to a greater focus on the problems of the periphery, occupied by the dominant share of audience ratings. However, from 2006 onwards, when TV Record Rio de Janeiro canceled Informe Rio to show the second phase of the Balanço Geral in the midday slot, the news program fell to third place with the advance of its competitor.

In response, the station's management began to promote changes in the news, which resulted in the dismissal of Renata Affonso, replaced by reporter Marcelo Castilho in December of the same year, and by Paulo Nogueira, who took on the role of editor of the news program. The changes had no effect, and in March 2009, Castilho was replaced by Luiz Bacci, while SBT Rio assumed a characteristic of strong popular appeal, as did Balanço Geral.

In November 2010, Rogério Forcolen was hired by TV Record RS to present SBT Rio, while Luiz Bacci left the news program to present RJ Record on Record Rio. Forcolen remained in charge of SBT Rio until January 2013, when he was also hired by Record Rio. In her place, reporter Isabele Benito debuted, who has been in charge of the news since then. On 23 September of the same year, SBT Rio Manhã debuted, presented by Liane Borges, which was born from the need for SBT Rio to have more local programs and increase its audience in the mornings.

On 11 August 2014, it was confirmed that the team of sports columnist and narrator José Carlos Araújo, known as "Garotinho", had been hired by the broadcaster to present a sports program. The team, which included, in addition to Garotinho, Dé Aranha, Gérson and Gilson Ricardo, had terminated its contract with Band Rio, where it presented the Rio version of the sports game Os Donos da Bola.

On 8 September, SBT Esporte Rio premiered on the station, initially, due to electoral campaign obligations for the 2014 elections, occupying the final 10 minutes of the SBT Rio news program. After the end of political campaign, the program would be shown for 30 minutes, but due to the network's national schedule, it was kept in the final 10 minutes of the news. On 2 March 2015, the program stopped being a block on SBT Rio, starting to air at 12:30 pm, and only with Garotinho, Gérson and Gilson Ricardo. Garotinho would also present, from 2015 onwards, the weekly program Esporte Mágico, shown on Saturday afternoons.

On 29 June 2018, the SBT news program Rio Manhã aired for the last time, which was canceled following a decision by the head office in São Paulo to allow the showing of Primeiro Impacto. In December, José Carlos Araújo left the presentation of SBT Esporte Rio after going on vacation, however on 1 February 2019, he officially left SBT Rio together with Gérson and Gilson, leaving only Fernanda Maia in charge of the program. In this interim, the program now featured commentary from Pedro Certezas and Casimiro Miguel.

In May, reporter and comedian Smigol became part of the team of SBT Esporte Rio. Also in May, Esporte Mágico starts to be shown on Sunday mornings, due to the premiere of the new season of Cozinheiros vs. Chefs and the ratings success of Henry Danger. The program last aired on 20 October.

On 20 September 2021, the station's local news programs began to be produced from its new headquarters in the Charles de Gaulle Business Center. The SBT Rio news program then gained a new setting, with views of Marina da Glória and Morro do Pão de Açúcar, while SBT Esporte gained a new space and was renamed SBT Sports Rio, following the example of the program shown on Sundays by the network.

=== Entertainment ===
In its first years on air, TVS invested in an experimental schedule that was mostly made up of series, films and cartoons, which were rerun countless times at different times and days. One of them was Sessão Corrida, which aired the same film three times in a row throughout the day on the schedule. The formats created by the broadcaster itself included programs such as Silvio Santos Differente, an interview program with famous personalities and question and answer games, in a completely different style (as the title itself said) from what he had done until then on Rede Globo, the humorous Baccarat 76 with Ronald Golias, Um Instante Maestro with Flávio Cavalcanti and Horoscope with Zora Yonara . Still in the same year, together with Rede Tupi (via TV Tupi Rio de Janeiro), it started to retransmit Programa Silvio Santos, as soon as the program left Globo and debuted on Tupi on August 1.

From 1 June 1977, TVS began to expand its programming, initially focusing on telenovelas such as Meu Pedacinho de Chão, originally produced and shown in 1971 by TV Cultura and Rede Globo, and O Espantalho, which was on air on TV Record in São Paulo. The station would also produce the telenovela Solar Paraíso in 1978, which was restricted to Rio de Janeiro, being rerun years later on SBT. Attractions such as Programa Carlos Imperial, the children's program Bozo, the popular O Povo na TV and Sessão Premiada also appeared. Many of these programs were also shown in São Paulo through TV Record, a sister company of TVS and head of the Rede de Emissoras Independentes.
