= TV Golfinho =

Television station in Pernambuco, Brazil

- Fernando de Noronha, Pernambuco; Brazil
- Channels: Digital: 45; Virtual: 12

Programming
- Affiliations: TV Cultura and TV Brasil (through TV Pernambuco)

Ownership
- Owner: Sistema Golfinho de Comunicação; (Governo do Estado de Pernambuco)
- Operator: Administração do Distrito Estadual de Fernando de Noronha
- Sister stations: FM Noronha

History
- First air date: August 6, 1982
- Former channel numbers: Analog: 7 (VHF, 1982–1985); 9 (VHF, 1985-1988); 11 (VHF, 1988-2013; 2017-2025); 14 (UHF, 2016-2017)
- Former affiliations: TVE Brasil (1982-1985); Rede Globo (1985-2010); TV Brasil (through TV Pernambuco, 2010-2013) silent (2013-2016)

Technical information
- Licensing authority: ANATEL
- ERP: 0,25 kW
- Transmitter coordinates: 3°50′55.8″S 32°24′42.3″W

Links
- Public license information: Profile

TV Golfinho (channel 12) is a Brazilian television station based in the Fernando de Noronha archipelago, belonging to the state of Pernambuco. The station is a TV Brasil affiliate with assistance from TV Pernambuco. It is part of Sistema Golfinho de Comunicação (communication system of the General Administration of the State District), which also owns FM Noronha.

== History ==
Several attempts to obtain a television signal on the island of Fernando de Noronha had been made until the early 1980s, mainly during the FIFA World Cups. Antennas were installed in Morro do Pico and Morro do Francês by residents, who did not get good reception.

The government, which aimed to bring real-time TV programming to Fernando de Noronha, made attempts in 1980 and 1982 to install repeaters, without success due to problems with the signal.

Television officially arrived on the island on August 6, 1982 through TV Nacional Fernando de Noronha, installed by the military on channel 7 VHF. The population of the island began to receive programs from TV Nacional, a government television station based in Brasília.

In December 1985, the station adopted the name TV Golfinho and began operating on VHF channel 9, becoming affiliated to Rede Globo, whose programming was received via satellite. From 1986 onwards, public service announcements and reports began to be included in programming breaks. TV Golfinho began producing the local news program Jornal da Ilha in 1988, when it began to be managed by the state government due to the annexation of the island to the state of Pernambuco. The journalism department received reinforcement from journalists from Pernambuco.

On December 23, 2002, the station received the concession of channel 11 VHF for Fernando de Noronha, which had been used by the station since 1988.

On May 25, 2010, 24 days after Globo Nordeste installed a local repeater, on May 1, the station stopped being affiliated to Rede Globo, starting to retransmit TV Brasil programming, in a mixed affiliation with TV Pernambuco from Caruaru, owned by the state government.

In 2013, for financial reasons, TV Golfinho went off the air. The Golfinho System only keeps FM Noronha on the air.

After three years off the air, as a way of celebrating the 513th anniversary of the Fernando de Noronha Archipelago, TV Golfinho reestablished its activities on August 9, 2016, becoming affiliated with TV Cultura, in partnership with TV Nova, network affiliate in Olinda, near Recife. Reforms and restructuring was carried out. The station went on air on an experimental basis, through channel 14.

On December 7, 2017, the station was officially reopened, with a ceremony that was attended, among others, by the island's then administrator, Luís Eduardo Antunes, and the environment secretary, Sérgio Xavier, as well as directors of both TV Cultura and TV Nova.

On June 28, 2018, the station returns with local programming, with a new logo, new slogan "É Noronha na tela!", and a new program, Radar Notícias, a news bulletin during the schedule. On August 13, 2018, in the week of the island's 515th anniversary, after requests from the population, the traditional Jornal da Ilha returned to its programming.

On April 8, 2020, the station started broadcasting, from 9 am to 12 pm, classes for high school students at Escola Arquipélago, produced by the Pernambuco Department of Education. On August 9, 2021, at a meeting which was marked by the signing of TV Pernambuco's affiliation contract to TV Cultura, plans for the implementation of TV Golfinho's digital signal began.

On March 25, 2025, TV Pernambuco announced the implementation of the station's digital signal in the city, by means of a partnership with TV Golfinho. With that, the station started airing TV Brasil programming again. To strengthen the partnership, TV Pernambuco launched Conexão Noronha, which first aired on April 4. With it, the station's local reports made it to mainland Brazil, specifically Pernambuco.

On November 8, 2025, Sistema Golfinho de Comunicação was integrated into EPC (Empresa Pernambuco de Comunicação). With that, SGC, including TV Golfinho, gained a new identity.

== Technical information ==
On August 9, 2021, in a meeting that marked the signing of the TV Pernambuco affiliation contract with TV Cultura, plans were announced for the implementation of TV Golfinho's digital signal. However, none of the digital channels available in Fernando de Noronha have been granted to the station yet.

== Programming ==
In addition to rebroadcasting TV Cultura's national programming, TV Golfinho produces and broadcasts Jornal da Ilha.

== Staff ==
=== Current members ===
- Eloíde Araújo
- Gustavo Arland
- Karol Vieira
- Pedro Ribeiro
- Gabriel Rabelo

=== Former members ===
- Ana Clara Marinho (today at TV Globo Pernambuco)
- Ana Luíza Melo
- Andiara Gomes
- Bárbara Lessa
- Bruno Fontes (today at TV Globo Pernambuco)
- Carol Guibu
- Carolina Fleischman
- Daniel França
- Daniella Fonseca (today at TV Globo Pernambuco)
- Fernanda Pérez
- Gabriela Luna
- Izabel Melo
- Juliano Domingues
- Luciana Marinho
- Manuela Leimig
- Maria das Candeias
- Maria Luíza Borges (today at Sistema Jornal do Commercio de Comunicação)
- Nilton Leal
- Patricia Guimarães
- Raquel Monteiro
- Ramon Fleischman
- Ramos Pereira †
- Taíza Novaes
- Thânia Brito (today at FM Noronha)
- Vinícius Leal (today at TV Globo Brasília)
- Winola Tavares
- Yone Salles
