= RPC Cascavel =

RPC Cascavel (ZYB 402)
- Cascavel, Paraná; Brazil
- Channels: Digital: 32 (UHF); Virtual: 10
- Branding: RPC

Programming
- Affiliations: TV Globo

Ownership
- Owner: Grupo Paranaense de Comunicação; (TV Oeste do Paraná Ltda.)

History
- First air date: May 31, 1986
- Former names: TV Carimã (1986-2000); TV Oeste (2000-2001); RPC TV Oeste (2001-2010); RPC TV Cascavel (2010-2014)
- Former channel numbers: Analog: 10 (VHF, 1986-2018)
- Former affiliations: TV Cultura (1986-1991); TV Record/Rede Record (1986-1992); Rede OM (1992-1993); CNT (1993-1997; 1998-2000); Rede Gospel (1997-1998)

Technical information
- Licensing authority: ANATEL

Links
- Website: redeglobo.globo.com/RPC

RPC Cascavel (channel 10) is a Brazilian television station licensed to Cascavel, Paraná, Brazil, affiliated with TV Globo. The station is part of RPC and covers much of the south-western region of the state.

== History ==
=== TV Carimã ===
TV Carimã was founded on May 31, 1986, by businessman José Carlos Martinez, who already controlled TV Paraná, in Curitiba, and TV Tropical, in Londrina. These last two were stations owned by Rede OM, which at the time were affiliated with Rede Bandeirantes.

The city already had a broadcaster affiliated with Rede Bandeirantes (TV Tarobá), so TV Carimã alternated its local programming with attractions from TV Cultura, from São Paulo, and TV Record, at the time owned by Paulo Machado de Carvalho and Silvio Santos.

In 1991, the stations affiliated to Rede OM changed their affiliation. They left Bandeirantes and started transmitting the signal from Rede Record, which had been sold to Bishop Edir Macedo, in 1989, and in 1990 was building a national network. TV Carimã, which retransmitted part of Record's programming, started to relay the network's programming, together with the other OM broadcasters in Paraná.

In February 1992, Rede OM broke away from Record to become a new national television network. From then on, TV Carimã became its affiliate. On May 23, 1993, the OM Television Network changed its name to CNT (Central Nacional de Televisão).

In mid-1997, TV Carimã was purchased by Rede Gospel, belonging to the Igreja Renascer em Cristo and renamed TV Gospel. After the purchase, the new management began a downsizing process. Several professionals were dismissed and local programming was practically suspended. At the beginning of the following year, the owners of Rede Gospel did not pay the first installment of the sale and, by court order, the station was reinstated to the Martinez family.

=== RPC phase ===
In 2000, Rede Paranaense de Comunicação bought TV Carimã, which, on April 1, was officially extinguished and gave way to TV Oeste. The station became affiliated with Rede Globo. Before this date, Cascavel and the region received the signal from the Rio network through TV Cataratas, based in Foz do Iguaçu.

About a year later, the station began producing local blocks of the Paraná TV news program.

In 2018, the two editions of Paraná TV were renamed, respectively, Meio Dia Paraná and Boa Noite Paraná, with the aim of getting even closer to the public.

== Technical information ==
=== Subchannels ===
Channel	Video	Aspect	Short name	Programming
10.1	1080i	16:9	RPC TV	Main RPC programming / TV Globo

In November 2011, RPC Cascavel started broadcasting its digital signal.

In May 2014, RPC Cascavel's news operation converted to high definition.
