= TV Pernambuco =

TV Pernambuco (ZYQ 100)
- Caruaru, Pernambuco; Brazil
- Channels: Digital: 45 (UHF); Virtual: 12

Programming
- Affiliations: TV Brasil; TV Cultura

Ownership
- Owner: Government of Pernambuco; (Empresa Pernambuco de Comunicação S/A EPC)

History
- Founded: 1984
- First air date: November 28, 1984
- Former call signs: ZYB 300 (1984-2018)
- Former names: TV Tropical (1984-1988)
- Former channel numbers: Analog: 12 (VHF, 1984–2018)
- Former affiliations: SBT (1984-1987); Rede Bandeirantes (1987-1991); Rede Record (1991-1992); Rede OM (1992-1993); CNT (1997-1998); Rede 21 (1998-2001); Futura (2001-2006)

Technical information
- Licensing authority: ANATEL
- ERP: 3 kW
- HAAT: 112 m (367 ft)
- Transmitter coordinates: 8°17′6.2″S 35°58′37.1″W

Links
- Public license information: Profile
- Website: www.tvpernambuco.pe.gov.br

TV Pernambuco (channel 12) is a Brazilian television station based in Caruaru, a city in the state of Pernambuco. Owned by the state government, the station carries programs from both TV Brasil and TV Cultura.

== History ==
TV Tropical launched on November 28, 1984, as an SBT affiliate, also, the first television station with a license in the inland region of Pernambuco. The station launched simultaneously on VHF channels 12 in Caruaru and 9 in Recife, through Sistema Detelpe. In 1985, after one year on air, it started airing its first local programs, which included educational programs and news services.

In March 1987, after DENTEL approval, the station installed a relay station in Campina Grande, Paraíba, on VHF channel 5, which remained active until 1995. That year, the owners of Sistema Jornal do Commercio de Comunicação, responsible for TV Jornal (which suspended its inland transmissions due to a financial crisis), sold their assets and outlets to Grupo JCPM. TV Jornal's new owners put the station back on air and announced the change of affiliation from Rede Bandeirantes to SBT. With this, TV Jornal exchanged affiliation with TV Tropical, becoming a Bandeirantes affiliate. In 1988, after four years on air, the station changed its name to the current TV Pernambuco.

In October 1991, shortly before the launch of TV Tribuna, which became the Band affiliate, it joined Rede Record. This lasted until the following year, when it joined Rede OM Brasil, after which, it rescinded contract at the time of the network's bankruptcy on April 14, 1993, and, instead of joining CNT, ended up joining TV Cultura. Between 1997 and 1998, it restored its CNT affiliation, later moving to Rede 21, and in 2001, to Canal Futura.

In 2006, TV Pernambuco left Futura and regained its TV Cultura affiliation. In 2009, it ended its second partnership with the São Paulo network and joined TV Brasil. Twelve years later, on August 9, 2021, the station signed a new contract with TV Cultura, vbringing back its programming from August 14.

In late October 2024, TV Cultura was studying the hypothesis of cutting its affiliation agreement with the station, after cutting the airing of a Roda Viva interview with João Campos. EPC denied that the cut was due to political issues; moreover, the station was airing a match between Atlético Mineiro and Sport for Brasileirão Série B when the interview was supposed to air, which was drawn from TV Brasil's networked schedule.
