= Band Rio Interior =

TV Bandeirantes Rio Interior (ZYP 122)
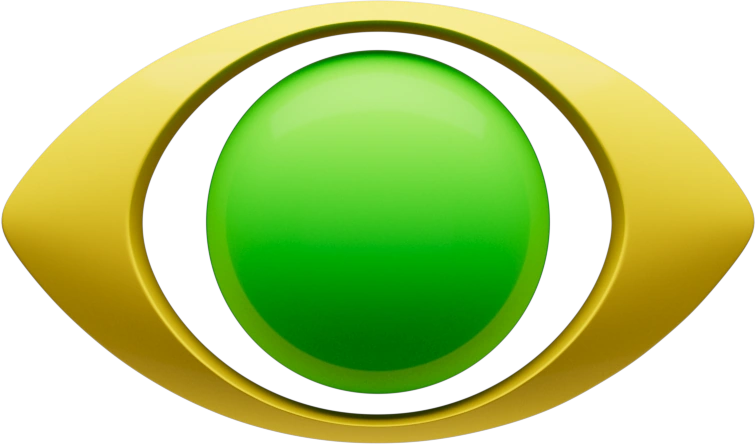
- Barra Mansa, Rio de Janeiro; Brazil
- Channels: Digital: 33 (UHF); Virtual: 8
- Branding: Band Rio Interior

Programming
- Affiliations: Rede Bandeirantes

Ownership
- Owner: Grupo Bandeirantes de Comunicação; (Sociedade de Televisão Sul Fluminense Ltda.)

History
- First air date: July 25, 1978
- Former call signs: ZYB 515 (1978-2018)
- Former names: TV Sul Fluminense (1978-2007); TV Bandeirantes Barra Mansa (2007-2012)
- Former channel numbers: Analog: 8 (VHF, 1978-2018)

Technical information
- Licensing authority: ANATEL
- ERP: 0.35 kW
- Transmitter coordinates: 22°32′4.3″S 44°9′51.5″W

Links
- Public license information: Profile
- Website: bandtv.band.uol.com.br/tv/riointerior

Band Rio Interior (channel 8) is a Rede Bandeirantes-owned-and-operated station licensed to the city of Barra Mansa, in the west of the state of Rio de Janeiro. The first television license to operate outside of the state capital, it generates programming for 72 municipalities in the state's inland region.

== History ==
Its license was granted by Ernesto Geisel and Minister of Communications Ernesto Quandt de Oliveira on April 18, 1975. The station was founded on July 28, 1978, as TV Sul Fluminense, by politician and businessman Feres Nader, and since the beginning, it was a Rede Bandeirantes affiliate. It was the first television station in the state's interior, repeating the footsteps of its sister radio station, Rádio Sul Fluminense, founded in 1944. In 1999, the station started broadcasting via the Brasilsat B3 satellite, reaching all of Brazil and parts of its neighboring countries.

On January 9, 2004, TV Sul Fluminense is sold to businessman Domingo Alzugaray, owner of Editora Três, which publishes, among other magazines, IstoÉ. In 2007, it was sold to Grupo Bandeirantes de Comunicação, becoming Band Barra Mansa, and in 2012, Band Rio Interior.

On June 4, 2013, alleging "financial adequation", the station fired 30 of its 52 staff, including its news director, Adriano Lizarelli. Band Rio Interior's three remaining local programs (Tô na Área, Band Cidade and Entrevista Coletiva) ended, and in its place, the station started airing the programming of Band Rio full time.

In 2016, to cover the lack of its own local programming, it decided to bring back Tô na Área, but only on Sundays, at 9am. In 2017, Boa Noite Interior started, an interview program about culture, business and politics, under the helm of Elias Raffide, on Saturdays, at 6:50pm. In 2018, o Tô na Área moved to Saturday mornings; on the afternoons at 1:30pm, it started airing Taí para Todos, absorbing the team of Boa Noite Interior, which was cancelled.

== Technical information ==
Virtual	Physical	Screen	Content
8.1	33 UHF	1080i	Band Rio Interior / Band's main schedule

In February 2012, Band Rio Interior started its digital broadcasts on UHF channel 33.

The station shut down its analog signal on VHF channel 8 on December 12, 2018, following the official ANATEL roadmap.
