= Neto (footballer, born 1966) =

Brazilian footballer and commentator

Craque Neto
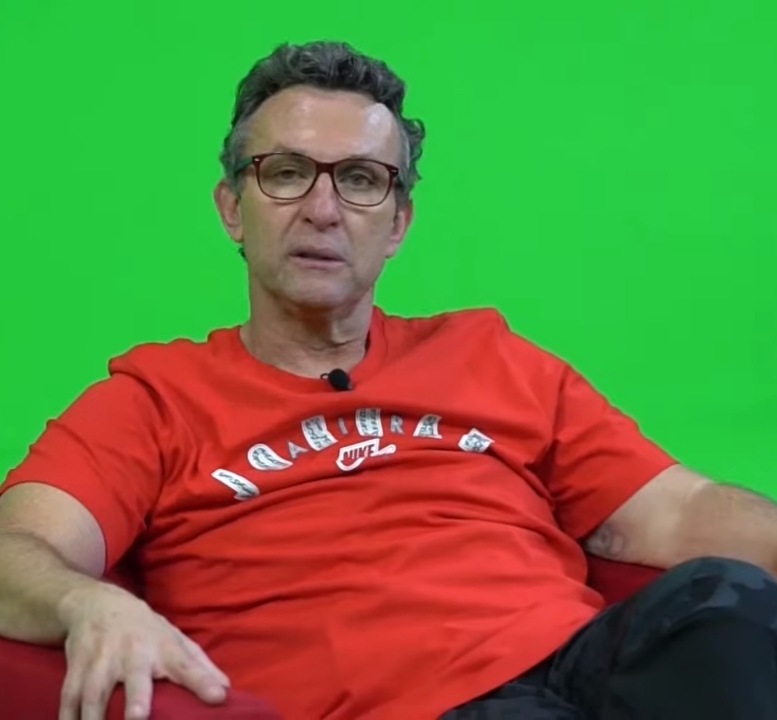
- Neto in 2021

Personal information
- Full name: José Ferreira Neto
- Date of birth: 9 September 1966 (age 60)
- Place of birth: Santo Antônio de Posse, Brazil
- Height: 1.74 m (5 ft 8 1/2 in)
- Positions: Attacking midfielder; second striker; winger

Youth career
- 1979–1980: Ponte Preta
- 1980–1983: Guarani

Senior career*
| Years | Team | Apps | (Gls) |
| 1983–1986 | Guarani | 73 | (59) |
| 1986 | Bangu | 9 | (1) |
| 1987 | São Paulo | 33 | (7) |
| 1988 | Guarani | 44 | (15) |
| 1989 | Palmeiras | 25 | (9) |
| 1989–1993 | Corinthians | 227 | (120) |
| 1993 | Millonarios | 9 | (5) |
| 1994 | Atlético Mineiro | 9 | (2) |
| 1994 | Santos | 18 | (3) |
| 1995 | Matsubara | 10 | (10) |
| 1995 | Guarani | 13 | (2) |
| 1996 | Araçatuba | 13 | (2) |
| 1996–1997 | Corinthians | 19 | (1) |
| 1997 | Osan | 22 | (5) |
| 1998–1999 | Etti Jundiaí | 11 | (6) |
| 1999 | Deportivo Italchacao | 5 | (1) |

International career
| 1983 | Brazil U23 | 9 | (0) |
| 1988–1993 | Brazil | 15 | (5) |
Medal record
Men's football
Representing Brazil
Copa América
| Runner-up | 1991 Chile |
Olympic Games
| Silver medal – second place | 1988 Seoul | Team |
Pan American Games
| Silver medal – second place | 1983 Caracas | Team |
South American U-20 Championship
| Winner | 1985 Paraguay |
- * Club domestic league appearances and goals

José Ferreira Neto (born 9 September 1966), commonly known as Craque Neto or simply Neto, is a Brazilian former professional footballer and current sports broadcaster. After retiring from the game he has been active in the media. He's been working for Bandeirantes since 1999, and currently presents, Os Donos da Bola.

An attacking midfielder, he played 470 games and scored 184 goals in his entire career.

== Biography ==
Neto was born in Santo Antônio de Posse, a small town near Campinas, in the State of São Paulo.

== Club career ==
Neto began his football career very early in life, playing for Campinas-based team Guarani at youth level, before being promoted to the senior side. In the mid-1980s he also played for Bangu (in Rio de Janeiro) and São Paulo, before returning to Guarani once again. In 1988, he brought more attention upon himself by scoring a goal from a bicycle-kick in the São Paulo State Championship finals against Corinthians.

In 1989 Neto played for Palmeiras and was subsequently transferred to Corinthians, where he remained for a good part of his career, wearing club's the number 10 shirt, and becoming an idol with the club's fans in the beginning of the nineties. With his precise passing game and strong personality, he was the key player during the 1990 National Championship in Brazil, when Corinthians won the finals against São Paulo.

After almost five years and 114 goals for Corinthians, his time with the club came to a close. However, even today Neto is remembered as one of the most iconic players in the club's history. After his spell with Corinthians, he played for many other clubs, in Brazil (Araçatuba, Atlético Mineiro, Matsubara, Santos) and abroad (Millonarios of Colombia). He is one of the few players to have played for all four major teams in the state of São Paulo.

Neto's career was always plagued by weight problems and disagreements with referees and club managers, due to his strong character. His most famous episode was when he spat in referee José Aparecido de Oliveira's face, earning himself a 4-month suspension from the games. Neto says this is the only regrettable thing he did in his career.

Neto retired from professional football at the end of the nineties.

== International career ==
Neto was a member of the Brazilian under-23 team that won a bronze medal at the 1983 Pan American Games. Following his performances in the São Paulo State Championship throughout the season, in 1988, Neto was named to the Brazil national team that went to Seoul to play in the Summer Olympic Games. In the final against the Soviet Union, Neto helped set up Romário's opening goal of the match from a corner-kick, however, the Soviets came from behind to defeat Brazil 2–1 in extra-time to capture the gold medal. Neto was later also included in the Brazilian squad that finished second in the 1991 Copa América in Chile; under manager Falcão, he was named the team's captain, and wore the number 10 shirt throughout the tournament. He scored his only goal of the competition from a penalty in a 2–1 win over Bolivia on 9 July, in the first round group stage. In total, he made 26 appearances for Brazil at international level between 1988 and 1993, scoring 7 goals; 9 of his appearances came with the Olympic youth side, and 16 with the senior team, including one appearance and one goal in an unofficial friendly.

== Style of play ==
A set-piece specialist, in Brazil Neto is commonly considered to be one of the greatest free kick takers ever, and one of the best Brazilian players of the early 1990s. A versatile midfielder, he was capable of playing in several offensive midfield positions, but was usually deployed as an attacking midfielder behind the forwards, due to his technique, range of passing, and excellent playmaking skills; he was also occasionally used as a second striker or as a winger. In addition to being known for his accuracy from dead ball situations, he was also noted for his precise long passing, and his ability to act as a leader for his teammates on the field.

== Honours ==
São Paulo

- Campeonato Paulista: 1987

Corinthians

- Campeonato Brasileiro Série A: 1990
- Supercopa do Brasil: 1991
- Campeonato Paulista: 1997

Deportivo Italchacao

- Venezuelan Primera División: 1998–99

Brazil U-20

- South American U-20 Championship: 1985

Brazil

- Copa America runner-up :1991

== After football ==
After the conclusion of his footballing career, Neto briefly served as the manager of Guarani.

He later became a commentator and sports pundit for TV Bandeirantes. Neto's simple way of speaking, and his blunt, "ogre-like" behavior have made him a famous broadcaster in Brazil. Working alongside names such as José Luiz Datena and Milton Neves, Neto has, however, clashed against fellow sports journalists such as Tiago Leifert and various footballers.

== Personal life ==
The son of a former military policeman, Neto is a father of two children. After his retirement from professional football, Neto underwent a gastric bypass surgery to help with his excess weight. The surgery was a success, and the footballer, who was once plagued by weight problems, has since ran in marathons.
