= Isabele Benito =

Brazilian journalist (born 1980)

- Born: July 24, 1980 (age 46); Santo Anastácio, São Paulo, Brazil
- Occupations: Journalist, TV presenter, reporter and radio host
- Children: 1

Isabele Benito Rios, better known as Isabele Benito (born July 24, 1980), is a Brazilian journalist, TV presenter, reporter and radio host.

== History ==
Graduated in journalism from the Universidade do Oeste Paulista, Isabele wanted to be a journalist since she was little. The beginning of her career was at Rádio Cultura, a broadcaster in her hometown, Santo Anastácio. Isabele participated in a women's program, without the listener imagining that, behind the microphone, a girl of just 17 years old was speaking. At the age of 19, she made her live debut on television, on the program Revista, on TV Fronteira, a TV Globo affiliate in Presidente Prudente. The first entry was, right away, as a presenter. A foreshadowing of what was to come.

In an interview with Universidade Veiga de Almeida, Isabele said that even during her internship at TV Globo, she performed almost all functions within a television. And that she was even a camera operator.

Isabele stayed at TV Globo São Paulo for 8 years. Afterwards, she was a sectorist at the São Paulo Stock Exchange for Canal Rural (when it belonged to the Grupo RBS) at BM & F Bovespa, in 2012, she was hired to be a reporter for SBT in Rio de Janeiro. In January 2013, Isabele took charge of the news program SBT Rio. She became known for her catchphrase É dedo na cara! (from Portuguese: It's finger in the face!), which she uses to point out irregularities, injustices, or to criticize someone or something.

On September 23, 2013, SBT debuted SBT Notícias, under the command of Neila Medeiros. The news covered news from Brazil and the world, with live images taken by helicopters spread across the cities of São Paulo and Rio de Janeiro. Neila presented in São Paulo, and had the participation of Isabele Benito directly from Rio de Janeiro, throughout each edition of the news program. But unfortunately, the newspaper was constantly losing to its competitors Cidade Alerta and Brasil Urgente, and was suffering between 2 and 3 points, and was canceled almost 3 months after its debut.

In February 2014, she had a brief stint in São Paulo to present SBT Manhã, replacing César Filho, who was covering the carnival in Salvador. And then she returned to the capital of Rio de Janeiro.

In December of the same year, she was asked to present Notícias da Manhã, covering Neila Medeiros' time off.

On December 16, 2017, Isabele debuted on Super Rádio Tupi from Rio de Janeiro, the Programa Isabele Benito, which is broadcast from Monday to Friday from 10 to 11 am. In July 2019, she became a columnist for the newspaper O Dia.

Currently, she continues to lead SBT Rio, where she is vice-leader of audience, just behind Globo on RJTV, arousing the interest of Record and the renewal with SBT. In March 2023, she joined the program Fofocalizando, in May of the same year, renewed with SBT until 2025.

== Awards and nominations ==
Year	Award	Category	Result	Ref.
2021	Melhores do Ano NaTelinha	Best Local Presenter	Nominated	
2022	Melhores do Ano NaTelinha	Best Local Presenter	Nominated	

== Personal life ==
Isabele Benito is married to financial manager Marcielo Rios, with whom she has a son, Eduardo, born in 2012.
