= CNT Curitiba =

CNT Curitiba (ZYB 391)

Curitiba, Paraná; Brazil
- Channels: Digital: 43 (UHF); Virtual: 16
- Branding: CNT

Programming
- Affiliations: Central Nacional de Televisão

Ownership
- Owner: Martinez Family; (Rádio e Televisão OM Ltda.)

History
- First air date: December 19, 1960
- Former names: TV Paraná
- Former channel numbers: Analog: 6 (VHF, 1960-2018)
- Former affiliations: Tupi (1960–78); Bandeirantes (1978–91); Record (1991–92); OM Brasil (1992–93)

Technical information
- Licensing authority: ANATEL
- ERP: 8 kW
- Transmitter coordinates: 25°23′36.8″S 49°16′58.5″W

Links
- Public license information: Profile
- Website: www.cnt.com.br

CNT Curitiba is a Brazilian television station based in Curitiba, capital of the state of Paraná. It operates on channel 6 (digital UHF 43) and is both an owned-and-operated station and the generator of Central Nacional de Televisão. It shares the leadership of the network with CNT Rio de Janeiro and CNT Tropical. The channel was opened in 1960 as TV Paraná on the initiative of journalists Assis Chateaubriand, owner of the media conglomerate Diários Associados, from which the station had support, and Adherbal Stresser. Sold to the Martinez family, it led a small state network in the 1980s that later had national coverage, Rede OM. It changed its identification to CNT in 1993.

== History ==
TV Paraná was opened on December 19, 1960, being the second television station launched in the state, which had been with TV Paranaense since October 29 of the same year. The station had logistical support from Diários Associados, a media conglomerate belonging to journalist Assis Chateaubriand, who directly acquired the concession of channel 6 in Curitiba from the Federal Government, and its installation was in charge of Adherbal Stresser, then director of the newspaper Diário do Paraná. The support allowed the channel to benefit from equipment and professionals from TV Tupi in São Paulo, also from the Chateaubriand group, from which some of its programs were retransmitted in Paraná. The local network prioritized sports broadcasts, and the station was the first in Brazil to show a football game with narration.

In 1975, Diários Associados and the Stresser family sold TV Paraná to businessman Oscar Martinez, and his son José Carlos Martinez took over the management of the station. In 1978, it began retransmitting Rede Bandeirantes programming. The following year, the Martinezs opened TV Tropical in Londrina, which would also be affiliated with Bandeirantes. Both channels form a state network that in 1982 was named Rede OM (acronym for Organizações Martinez). During the 1980s, two other stations were created and made up the network — TV Carimã de Cascavel and TV Maringá.

In June 1991, TV Paraná and TV Tropical joined Rede Record. At the end of that year, plans were announced to expand OM's coverage to other states, which would make it a nationwide network, with TV Paraná as generator, thus ceasing to retransmit Record and assuming independent programming. The launch of the Rede OM Brasil took place in March 1992. In May of the following year, with the wear and tear caused by the controversies in which it was involved, the network changed its name to Central Nacional de Televisão (CNT), and its O&Os adopted the new name.

== Technical information ==
Channel	Video	Aspect	Short name	Programming
6.1	1080i	16:9	CNT	Main CNT Curitiba programming / CNT
