= CNT Rio de Janeiro =

CNT Rio de Janeiro (ZYB 518)
- Rio de Janeiro, Rio de Janeiro; Brazil
- Channels: Digital: 27 (UHF); Virtual: 9
- Branding: CNT

Programming
- Affiliations: Central Nacional de Televisão

Ownership
- Owner: Martinez Family; (TV Corcovado S/A)

History
- First air date: March 1982
- Former names: TV Record Rio de Janeiro (1982–1987); TV Copacabana (1987); TV Corcovado (1987–1993)
- Former channel numbers: Analog: 9 (VHF, 1982-2017)
- Former affiliations: Rede Record (1982–1987); MTV Brasil (1990–1992); Rede OM Brasil (1992–1993)

Technical information
- Licensing authority: ANATEL
- ERP: 9 kW
- Transmitter coordinates: 22°56′59.5″S 43°13′46.6″W

Links
- Public license information: Profile
- Website: www.cnt.com.br

CNT Rio de Janeiro (channel 9) is a Central Nacional de Televisão-owned-and-operated television station licensed to Rio de Janeiro. Its studios are located on the São Cristóvão neighborhood, while its transmitting antenna is located atop Morro do Sumaré, in Rio Comprido.

== History ==
=== Background ===
VHF channel 9 in Rio de Janeiro was first occupied by TV Continental, from 1959 to 1971, revoked by the Brazilian government in 1972 after going offline due to financial difficulties faced throughout its years of activity. After its shutdown, the station's transmitter, tower and antenna were put up for auction and purchased by television presenter Silvio Santos, who took advantage of them to use them in the operation of his first channel, TVS. In 1973, channel 9 in Rio was granted to Jornal do Brasil, whose intention was to form a national network with another concession obtained in São Paulo, but due to problems that postponed the launch, both were returned to the government in 1978.

In 1980, Ministry of Communications opened a public tender to hand over to new owners seven Rede Tupi television channels, revoked due to administrative problems, in which Silvio Santos took part. The following year, he was granted the concessions of São Paulo, Belém and Porto Alegre, which would form the Brazilian Television System (SBT), except the one for 9 in Rio de Janeiro, which did not join SBT. Due to the legislation not allowing a person to obtain more than one radio or television concession in the same city, Guilherme Stoliar, Silvio's nephew, became its legal owner, while the presenter would command it informally.

=== TV Record Rio de Janeiro (1982–1987) ===
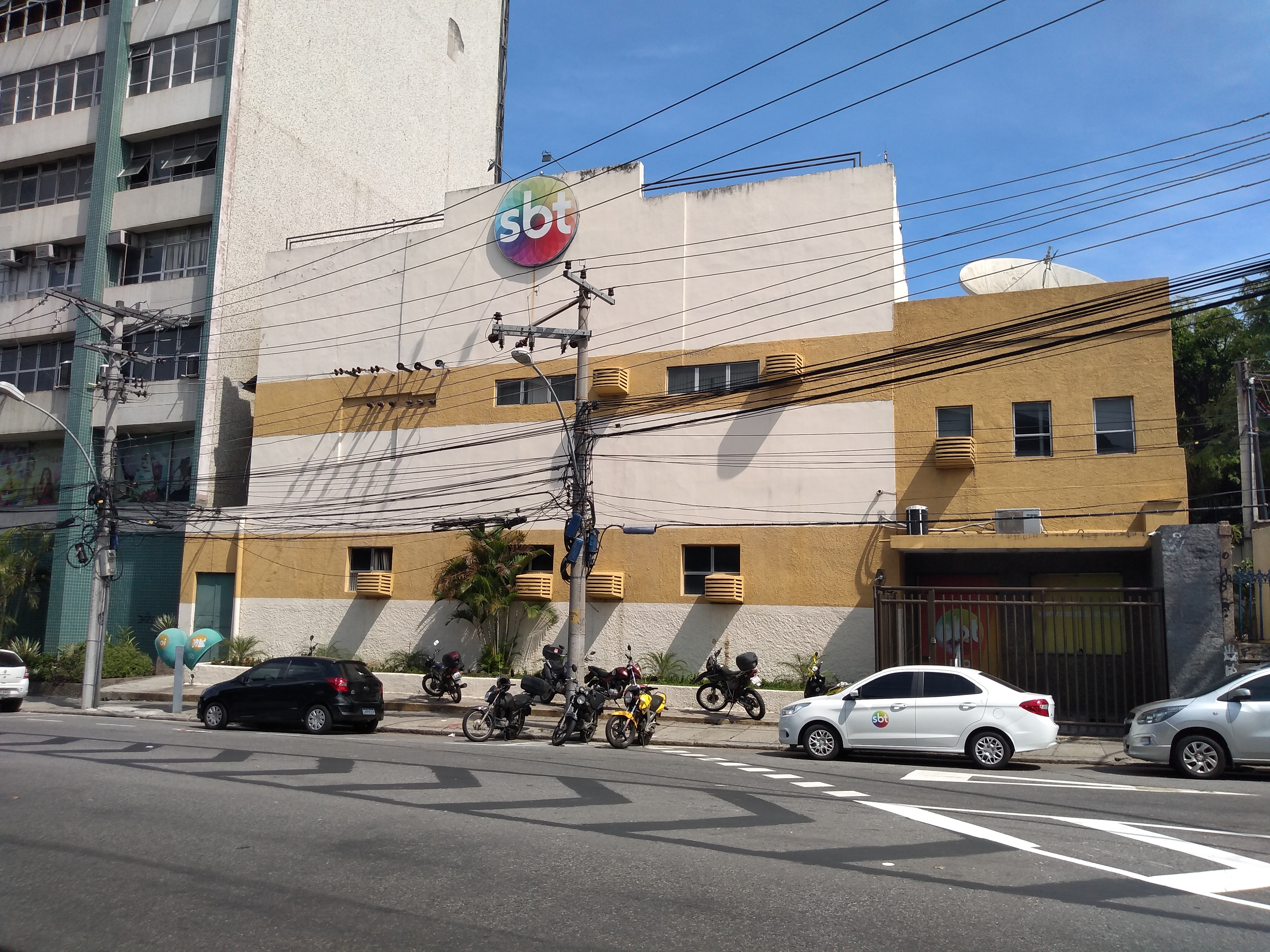
TV Record Rio de Janeiro's building where it was based in 1982 and was later given to SBT Rio, remaining until 2021

In 1982, Silvio Santos launched, through the concession offered in Rio de Janeiro, a branch of TV Record in São Paulo, which he owned in partnership with Paulo Machado de Carvalho. Cinema Fluminense, in Campo de São Cristóvão, in neighborhood of the same name, began to be renovated in January for the installation of the broadcaster, which would have an auditorium and a 320 m² stage. In March, job vacancies were offered for engineers and electronics technicians, attracting around a thousand candidates to the address of the future station. Investments in the purchase of equipment and expenses for renovating its headquarters totaled 2.5 million dollars.

TV Record Rio de Janeiro was scheduled to begin broadcasting at noon on April 3, but due to a delay in the delivery of a piece manufactured in the United States, the launch was postponed to 8 pm. The first local program was the match between Fluminense and Grêmio, which took place the following day, in Porto Alegre, valid for the quarter-finals of the Gold Cup. At the end of the same year, there was an exchange of headquarters between TV Record and TVS: the first was moved to the second's studios, on Rua General Padilha, while the latter went to the Cinema Fluminense building, considered more appropriate for recording its program O Povo na TV, in addition to there being an idea of making Rio de Janeiro the production center of Record, which did not go ahead.

In September 1985, a process was opened to sell part of Paulo Machado de Carvalho's group of broadcasters corresponding to Silvio Santos to the director-president of Jornal do Brasil Nascimento Brito and the president of FIFA João Havelange. While radio and television stations in the state of São Paulo would have 50% of their shares acquired, TV Record Rio de Janeiro would be transferred 80%. Havelange had the support of directors from the Mexican group Televisa, including Emilio Azcárraga Milmo, as they had strong links with football. The purchase, however, did not go ahead.

=== TV Corcovado/CNT (since 1987) ===
April 1987, the station adopted the name TV Copacabana, changed again, on June 8, to TV Corcovado, due to legislation disallowing the use of a name by two media outlets not belonging to the same owner — there was Rádio Copacabana in Rio de Janeiro, owned by the bishop Edir Macedo, leader of the Universal Church of the Kingdom of God.

On August 17, 1990, TV Corcovado and Grupo Abril signed an agreement, valid for three years, to retransmit MTV Brasil, whose brand was licensed by the channel of the same name from the North American company Viacom, becoming its first affiliate and receiving half of its revenue. To show the new network's programming, the station purchased transmission equipment with stereo sound. The affiliation with MTV Brasil began at noon on October 20, simultaneously with the inauguration of the network from São Paulo, which aired the music video for Marina Lima's version of the song "Garota de Ipanema", however technical problems in the transmission's audio meant that TV Corcovado only aired the images. After a few minutes, the song "Walk of Life", by the band Dire Straits, was inserted over the clip, and at 1:07pm the situation was normalized. During the incident, the broadcaster aired a message attributing the problem to the São Paulo generator.

In July 1991, TV Corcovado was sold to businessman and politician José Carlos Martinez, owner of Rede OM, from Paraná, who, affiliated with Rede Record, planned to form a national network. The affiliation contract with MTV Brasil continued to be valid, but with its end approaching, Grupo Abril looked for a channel in the UHF band in Rio. On March 4, 1992, after investing in a campaign to help viewers tune in to their new channel, the MTV Brasil signal also went on air on UHF channel 24, and on March 9, TV Corcovado joined Rede OM Brasil, inaugurated in the same day.

On August 22, Martinez revealed, in testimony to a committee at the Chamber of Deputies, that he had requested 2.5 billion cruises from businessman Paulo César Farias and received a phantom administrative check from Banco Rural to acquire the station and integrate it into the OM Network. Farias was one of the treasurers of the 1989 electoral campaign of the candidate for president of the Republic Fernando Collor and was involved in a major corruption scandal known as Esquema PC by committing irregularities during his term. The case in relation to the case against Martinez, accused by the Federal Public Prosecutor's Office of tax evasion, currency evasion and ideological falsehood, was opened in the Superior Electoral Court on November 4, 2002. On May 23, 1993, with its image damaged due to structural and financial problems and having been the target of corruption allegations, Rede OM Brasil was renamed Central Nacional de Televisão, resulting in the change of the Rio station to CNT Rio de Janeiro.

On November 11, 2011, CNT Rio de Janeiro began testing its digital signal transmission on channel 27 UHF. Based on the federal decree transitioning Brazilian television stations from analog to digital signals, CNT, as well as other broadcasters in Rio, ceased broadcasting on VHF channel 9 on November 22, 2017, following the official ANATEL roadmap.

== Programming ==
At the beginning of its phase as TV Record Rio de Janeiro, its programming, under the direction of Paulo Machado de Carvalho Filho, consisted of cartoons and feature films during much of the day and independent productions, such as Noites Cariocas, presented by Nelson Motta and Scarlet Moon, with live broadcasts of shows at the Marina Palace Hotel, in addition to performances by singers from MPB. Attractions from TV Record São Paulo were also rebroadcast. In late 1982, it consolidated itself in third place in audience at IBOPE's rankings, behind TV Globo and TVS.

In 1987, independent productions from the now renamed TV Corcovado filled its schedule. One of the main ones was Rio Turismo, which presented tourist attractions in Rio de Janeiro with editions in Portuguese, English and Spanish and served as an attraction for tourists staying in hotels in the city. Its exhibition occupied several time slots on the station's schedule. In the same year, it integrated, with TVE, a transmission network for the Pan-American Games to Rio de Janeiro. During this period, it ranked second to last in terms of audience among Rio stations, beating only TV Rio. In November 1989, aiming to make programming competitive in terms of audience, TV Corcovado began retransmitting TV Record programs, including news, variety and film sessions. When affiliated with MTV Brasil, it concentrated its local programming in the mornings, with most of it dedicated to religious programming.

One of the station's first programs as a CNT affiliate was the sports show Mesa Redonda Rio, presented by narrator José Carlos Araújo from 1993 to 2007, which was later replaced by Balanço Esportivo Rio, with Edilson Silva, from 2008 to 2015. In 1997, the independent program Samba de Primeira debuted on its schedule, which had been broadcast on TV Corcovado and Band Rio in the 1980s and 1990s. Commanded by Jorge Perlingeiro, who was inspired by a painting from his father's Programa Aérton Perlingeiro, on Rede Tupi between the 1960s and 1970s, the attraction went off the air in 2015 due to lack of sponsorship. Also in 1997, Wagner Montes was hired by the channel, where he presented 190 Urgente, Na Poca do Povo and Em Cima do Fato and the variety programs Programa Wagner Montes and Novos Talentos, canceled due to accusations of plagiarism from a similar TV Globo production. Montes remained at CNT until 2003, when he went to TV Record. In the late 2000s, like the network, CNT Rio de Janeiro leased part of its local programming to church productions.

In 2024, in addition to retransmitting CNT's national programming, the station airs Fala Baixada, presented by Mauro Vasconcelos, and Jogo do Poder, com Ricardo Bruno.
