= TV Paraná Turismo =

TV Paraná Turismo (ZYB 410)
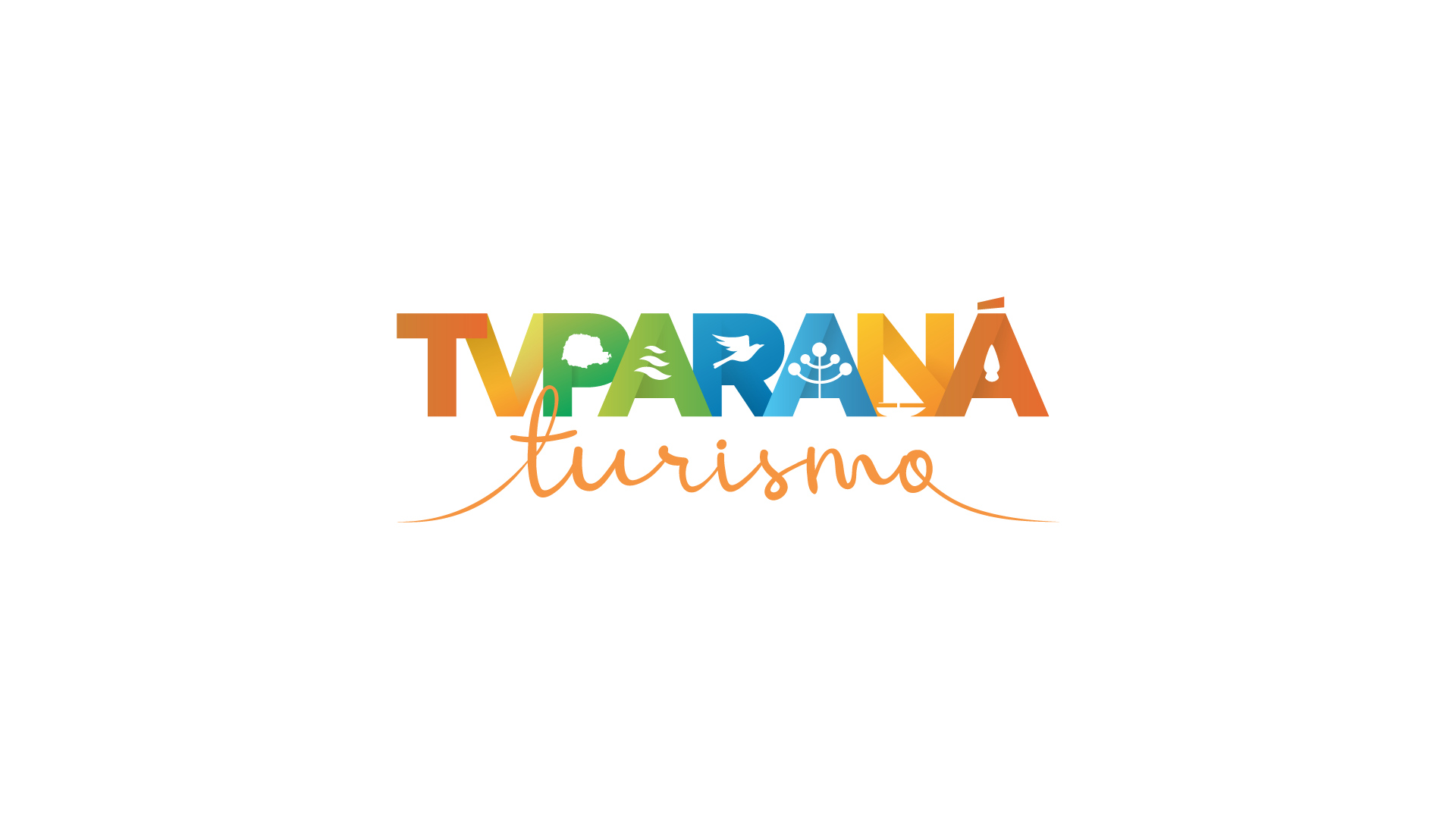
- Curitiba; Brazil
- Channels: Digital: 36 (UHF); Virtual: 9
- Branding: TV Paraná Turismo

Ownership
- Owner: Rádio e Televisão Educativa do Paraná; (RTVE PR - Rádio e Televisão Educativa do Paraná)
- Sister stations: Paraná Educativa FM • Paraná Educativa AM

History
- First air date: August 3, 1987
- Former names: TVE Paraná (1987-2001); Canal Paraná (2001-2003); TV Paraná Educativa (2003-2011; 2018-2019) e-Paraná (2011-2018)
- Former channel numbers: Analog: 9 (VHF, 1987-2018)
- Former affiliations: TVE Brasil (1987-2007); TV Cultura (1995-2021); TV Brasil (2007-2019; 2021-2025)

Technical information
- Licensing authority: ANATEL
- Transmitter coordinates: 25°24′57.6″S 49°17′15.7″W

Links
- Public license information: Profile
- Website: comunicacao.pr.gov.br/tv-ao-vivo

TV Paraná Turismo (channel 9) is a public television station owned by the government of the state of Paraná. The station is an affiliate of TV Brasil.

== History ==
A new law for the state's extant public radio broadcaster was passed in November 1974. Although the law stipulated the establishment of a television station, there was no official confirmation at the time. The educational television station was constituted on August 3, 1987, when Fundação Rádio e Televisão do Paraná (Radio and Television Foundation of Paraná) was created. Initially known as TVE Paraná, the channel was renamed Canal Paraná in 2000 during the second Jaime Lerner government. Satellite broadcasting started on May 31, 2001 at 7pm.

When Roberto Requião became state governor in 2003, the name Paraná Educativa was adopted during his two mandates. This phase was marked by heavy political interference in its programming, only airing programs in favor of him and his party. These influences led to Requião announcing a suspension of the station on January 22, 2008 as a sign of protest against the R$50,000 fine for using the station as a political propaganda tool.

In February 2010, its license was renewed for a further fifteen years.

In 2011, during the Beto Richa government, the station was renamed E-Paraná and resumed the airing of TV Cultura's programming and later, some programs from TV Brasil. One of the first measures taken after the rename was the removal of the Eureka program on February 20, after seven years on air, causing criticism from students.

In the second half of June 2018, during Cida Borghetti's government, the station restored its previous name Paraná Educativa, forming a network with the group's other media outlets. With the beginning of Ratinho Júnior's government in January 2019, TV Paraná Educativa suspended all of its local programming, being replaced by a mere relay of TV Cultura. A restructuring process took place, with the withdrawal of half of its staff of 175 with a scheduled cut of up to R$4,2 million.

In May 2019, it was announced that the station would be renamed TV Paraná Turismo, launching new programs with travel tips, fauna, fishing and agrotourism. The station started this phase with seven hours of local programming, but with the intention of finishing the year with up to four hours of such programming a day. The official launch took place at 8pm on May 14; also on the same day, the station stopped carrying TV Brasil.

On May 26, 2021, TV Cultura announced the end of its partnership with the government of Paraná (which was reinstated in 2011). With the agreement, TV Cultura moved to a new station, Super Canal 13 Curitiba, while TV Paraná Turismo would become a TV Brasil affiliate.

On May 22, 2024, the station ceased nationwide satellite broadcasting in high definition over the SKY Brasil 1 satellite (Nova Parabólica platform), reverting to standard definition.

On July 28, 2025, it ceased broadcasting TV Brasil for the second time and began to focus on completely independent programming. The station announced the decision in June, motivated by the expansion of its signal throughout Paraná, and terminated its contract with EBC amicably.
