= Neila Medeiros =

Brazilian journalist

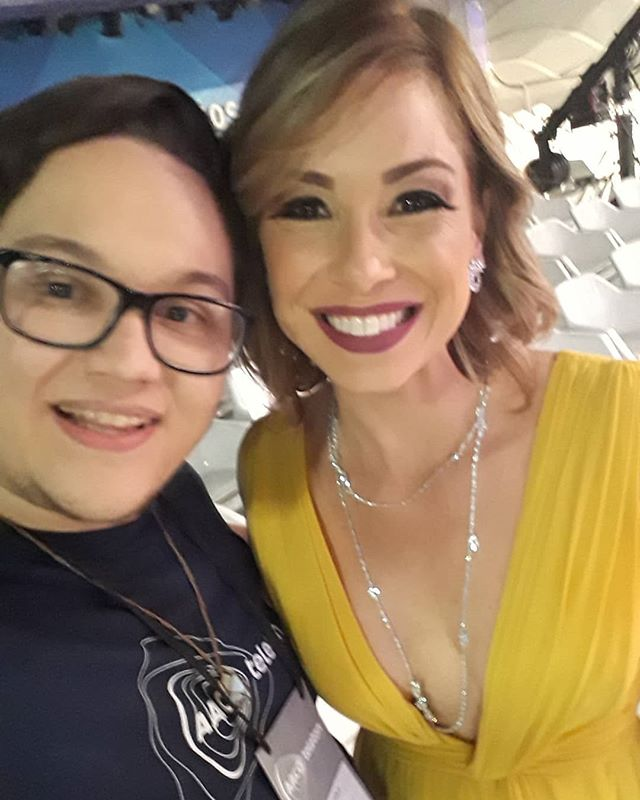
- Neila Medeiros with Daniel Spagnuolo
- Born: September 24, 1977 (age 48); Brasília, Federal District, Brazil
- Occupations: Journalist, publicist and TV host
- Children: 3

Neila Medeiros (born September 24, 1977) is a Brazilian journalist, publicist and TV host.

== Biography ==
Graduated in journalism at Higher Education Institute of Brasília, advertising at Universidade Potiguar and radio broadcasting at the Rio Grande do Norte Radialists Union, Neila began her career in Natal as a producer at an advertising agency. She began her career on television in 2001, working on TV Ponta Negra, an affiliate of SBT, in Rio Grande do Norte. presenting Jornal do Dia. She then returned to her birthplace, presenting the program Carreiras, on TV Justiça and then returning to SBT, acting as presenter of newscast SBT Brasília.

Being considered in the best TV anchor category in Brasília, with the Prêmio Engenho de Comunicação, her performance at the head of SBT Brasília, made her more prominent in SBT's journalistic schedule, and in mid-2013, she was invited to eventually present SBT Manhã. Her good performance led to her being invited to move to São Paulo, and present her first national newspaper, SBT Notícias. With the end of the program, she presented the Saturday editions of SBT Brasil, and in January the Jornal do SBT, covering Karyn Bravo's maternity leave.

On November 6, 2014, Neila Medeiros began presenting the news program Notícias da Manhã after César Filho left for RecordTV.

On April 10, 2015, the end of the news program was announced and Neila took over the eventual presentation of the other news programs in the house.

On June 24, 2015, she was dismissed from SBT along with affiliate coordinator Renato Dilago and one of the editors, Marco Nascimento.

On June 25, 2015, her dismissal was annulled and the presenter subsequently had her contract renewed. Neila returned to Brasília and in 2016 returned to command SBT Brasília. This managed to increase the channel's audience ratings in the federal capital. With Neila in charge, the lunchtime news reached 9 to 12 points, thus remaining in second place alone at the time, beating Record and disturbing the first place. The public's acceptance of the journalist is very high, both in Brasília and in São Paulo, where Neila left many fans and admirers of her work.

On June 16, 2021, Neila left SBT due to a reformulation at the station and on March 7, 2022, she agreed with RecordTV Brasília to present the local newscast DF no Ar.

== Awards and nominations ==
Year	Award	Category	Result	Ref.
2011	Prêmio Engenho de Comunicação	Best Presenter	Won	

== Medical Marijuana ==
In 2016, Federal District Judge George Lopes Leite granted habeas corpus in favor of Neila's family so that they could cultivate cannabis sativa (marijuana plant). Neila's daughter has Silver-Russell syndrome, which causes daily seizures and painful spasms. Each imported ampoule of cannabidiol costs around 300 dollars. Neila and her daughter Júlia participated in Salvo Conduto (2018). The documentary tells the stories of five families who grow marijuana for medicinal use.
