= Band Rio =

TV Bandeirantes Rio de Janeiro (ZYP 284)

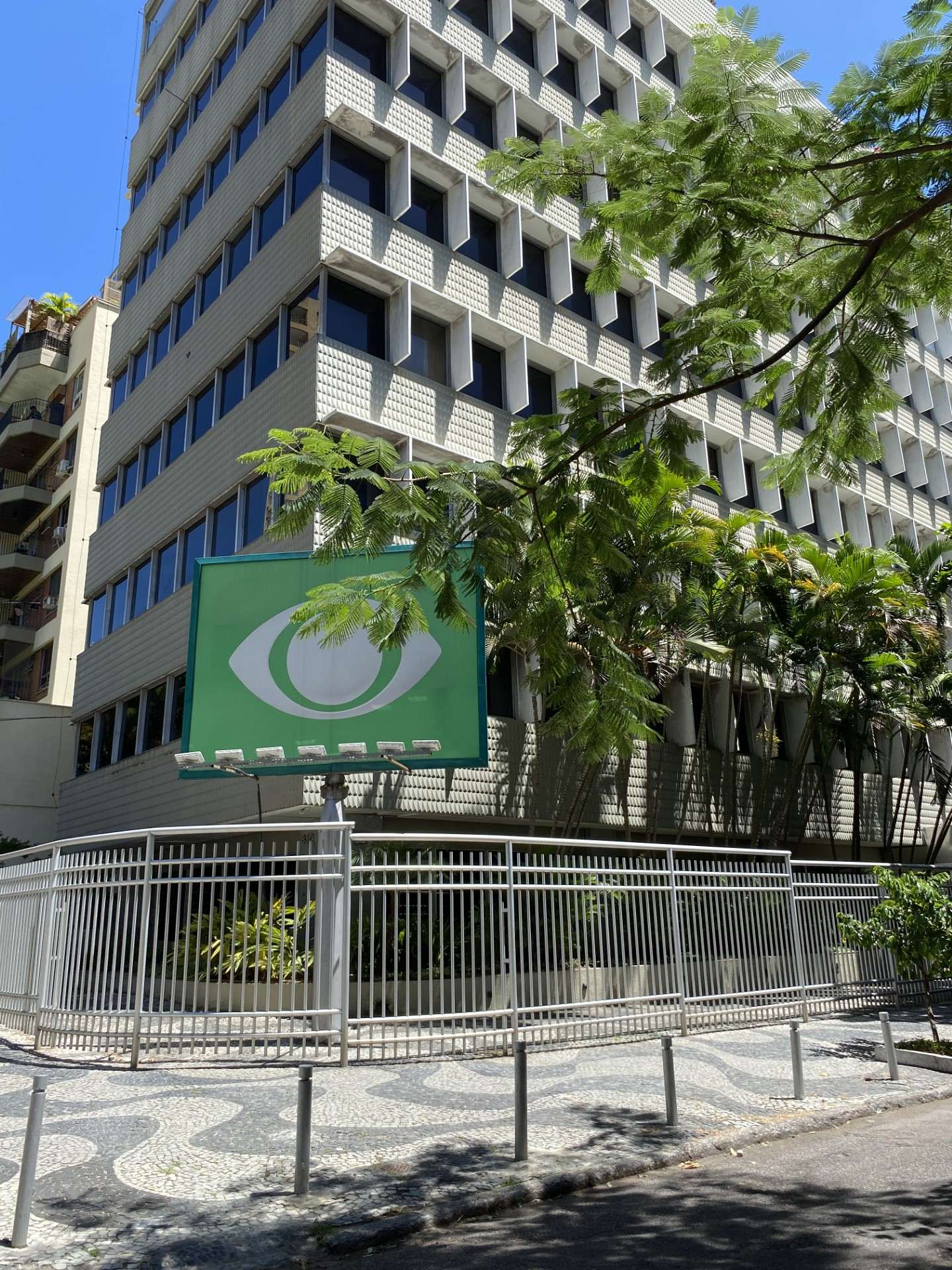
- Band Rio's headquarters
- Rio de Janeiro; Brazil
- Channels: Digital: 35 (UHF); Virtual: 7
- Branding: Band Rio

Programming
- Affiliations: Rede Bandeirantes

Ownership
- Owner: Grupo Bandeirantes de Comunicação; (Rádio e Televisão Bandeirantes do Rio de Janeiro Ltda.)

History
- First air date: September 9, 1977
- Former call signs: ZYB 514 (1977-2017)
- Former channel numbers: Analog: 7 (VHF, 1977-2017)

Technical information
- Licensing authority: ANATEL
- ERP: 6.1 kW
- Transmitter coordinates: 22°56′51.0″S 43°13′49.0″W

Links
- Public license information: Profile
- Website: band.com.br/rio

TV Bandeirantes Rio de Janeiro (channel 7) is a Rede Bandeirantes-owned-and-operated television station licensed to Rio de Janeiro, capital of the state of the same name. The station is the secondary flagship of the network. With its coverage area in the Rio metropolitan area and a small part of the state's inland region, Band Rio is one of the network's two stations in the state, alongside fellow O&O Band Rio Interior. Its studios are located in the Botafogo neighborhood, while its transmitters are located atop Morro do Sumaré, in Rio Comprido.

== History ==
In 1974, businessman João Jorge Saad, owner of TV Bandeirantes, channel 13 of São Paulo, obtained the license for channel 7 in Rio de Janeiro. Work for a building in Vila Isabel, North Zone, began, but there were delays due to a series of imshaps. The alternative was to buy the studios at Laboratório de Som e Imagem (Somil) in Botafogo, in the South Zone and adapting them for a television station. The need to establish a station in Rio de Janeiro was in line with Band's plans to become a national network, up until then, it was mostly regional.

The transmitter atop Morro do Sumaré, the master control, the cameras, videotape machines, telecine and other technical necessities seen as vital for its operation were all imported, and cost over US$ 2 million. The first test signal was broadcast on July 7, 1977. Experimental broadcasts began on August 1, 1977, but the then-TV Guanabara was inaugurated at 7pm on September 9. At first it aired 45 minutes of the usual launch solemnities followed by its first program, Meus Caros Amigos, a special music show presented by Chico Buarque de Holanda. At 9:05pm, the station aired Lawrence of Arabia.

Among the station's early staff was soccer commentator Galvão Bueno, who would later make a long-running career at TV Globo.

== Technical information ==
=== Subchannels ===
Channel	Video	Aspect	Short name	Programming
7.1	1080i	16:9	Band	Main Band Rio programming / Rede Bandeirantes

=== Analog-to-digital conversion ===
Band Rio discontinued its analog signal over VHF channel 7, on November 22, 2017, complying an order by ANATEL regarding the shutdown of analog television in Rio de Janeiro; the closure was supposed to be done in October but had been re-evaluated.

=== Satellite signal ===
Band Rio started satellite broadcasts in November 2005 using the Brasilsat B3 satellite.
