= SBT Interior RJ =

SBT Interior RJ (ZYB 512)
- Nova Friburgo, Rio de Janeiro; Brazil
- Channels: Digital: 24 (UHF); Virtual: 3

Programming
- Affiliations: SBT

Ownership
- Owner: Grupo Silvio Santos; (TVSBT Canal 03 de Nova Friburgo Ltda.)

History
- First air date: 5 June 1982
- Former names: TVS Nova Friburgo (1982-1990); SBT Nova Friburgo (1990-2014)
- Former channel numbers: Analog: 3 (VHF, 1982–2018)

Technical information
- Licensing authority: ANATEL
- ERP: 0.12 kW
- Transmitter coordinates: 22°21′33″S 42°33′56″W

Links
- Public license information: Profile
- Website: www.sbt.com.br/riodejaneiro/home

SBT Interior RJ (channel 3) is a Brazilian television station located in the city of Nova Friburgo, in the north of the state of Rio de Janeiro, serving as an owned-and-operated station of Sistema Brasileiro de Televisão for most of the state. The station has its facilities located remotely in Rio de Janeiro, the state's capital, where SBT Rio operates, and its transmitter is at top of Maciço da Caledônia.

== History ==
Grupo Silvio Santos received the grant for VHF channel 3 in Nova Friburgo on January 26, 1979, after a decree signed by President Ernesto Geisel. At the time, the group only controlled channel 11 in Rio de Janeiro, which had been on air since 1976.

TVS Nova Friburgo was opened on June 5, 1982, one year after the creation of SBT, which became its fifth owned-and-operated station, after the three it gained by default in 1981 (São Paulo, Porto Alegre, Belém) and the existing station in Rio. Its inauguration took place with a cocktail held for 200 guests at the Nova Friburgo Country Clube headquarters, which was attended by the regional director of SBT, Moysés Weltman, and the mayor of Nova Friburgo, Alencar Pires Barroso. It maintained the acronym "TVS" until 1990, when it was renamed SBT Nova Friburgo, and in 2014, it changed its current name.

On November 14, 2016, the station began producing its programming from the SBT Rio studios in the state capital. maintaining its news department in Nova Friburgo until January 2017, when the entire sector's staff was fired. Since then, only the station's operational sector continues to operate in Nova Friburgo, but controlled remotely by SBT Rio.

On October 15, 2025, after the official announcement of the debut of SBT News for December 15, it was announced that SBT Interior RJ would become the generator of the new network, ceasing to be a subsidiary of SBT after 43 years.

== Technical information ==
Virtual channel	Digital channel	Aspect ratio	Content
3.1	24 UHF	1080i	SBT Interior RJ/SBT's main schedule

Based on the federal decree on the transition of Brazilian TV stations from analogue to digital signals, SBT Interior RJ, as well as other stations in the city of Nova Friburgo, ceased broadcasting on VHF channel 3 on December 12, 2018, following the official ANATEL schedule.

== Programming ==
In its initial years, the station's programming was represented by journalism, with Jornal da Cidade, presented by Paulo Carvalho. During much of the 1990s and early 2000s, it acted almost as a mere retransmitter of the network and its Rio branch, with only commercial breaks being the exception.

On May 2, 2005, to make up for the lack of local programming, the broadcaster debuted SBT Jornal, with the presentation of Paulo Carvalho. During breaks, programs were also shown, such as SBT Comunidade, focused on short stories about facts from the interior of the state, and SBT Empresarial, dedicated to news about business. On April 14, 2008, Programa Atual premiered, produced in partnership with TV Zoom, a local subscription channel, and presented by Luciana Ferraz. Initially, it was shown daily from Monday to Friday, but in the following decade it moved to Sunday mornings, remaining on air until 2021.

At the same time, the teleshopping program Master Oferta was also shown, with Ferdinanda Maia and Alessandra Ribeiro, which ran between 2010 and 2016. In 2012, SBT Jornal was renamed SBT Cidade, maintaining the same previous format and migrating to the nighttime slot, preceding SBT Brasil. Paulo Carvalho continued to present the news until May 2014, when he died of a cardiac arrest at the age of 64. After his death, Salutiel Filót took over the presentation of the news program, which remained on the air until August 26, 2022, when he gave way to SBT Rio 2nd edition, generated by SBT Rio, currently called Tá na Hora Rio. Since then, the station has not shown local programs.
