= NRP Golfinho =

NRP Golfinho may refer to more than one ship of the Portuguese Navy:

- NRP Golfinho (1917), a Foca-class submarine in commission from 1917 to 1934
- NRP Golfinho (1934), a Delfim class submarine in commission from 1935 to 1950
