= Os Donos da Bola =

- Genre: Football roundtable discussion show
- Created by: Craque Neto
- Presented by: Craque Neto and various commentators
- Country of origin: Brazil
- Original language: Portuguese

Production
- Running time: 90 minutes

Original release
- Network: Rede Bandeirantes
- Release: 7 March 2012 – present

Os Donos da Bola (lit. 'The Masters of the Ball') is a Brazilian football roundtable discussion show, broadcast by Rede Bandeirantes since March 7, 2012. The program is hosted by former footballer Craque Neto, alongside a panel of commentators, including former goalkeeper Velloso and former midfielder Souza, who discuss current events in Brazilian football. In addition to the national version, each affiliate produces regional editions of the program, which cover football within their respective coverage areas.

== History ==
The program premiered on March 7, 2012, under the command of former footballer Craque Neto. The debut featured a special appearance by Ronaldo Fenômeno, who was present throughout the entire broadcast, along with commentators Denílson and Edmundo. The premiere garnered significant ratings, averaging 3.4 points and peaking at 5 on the IBOPE scale, securing fourth place in its time slot.

Over the years, the program established itself in Band's programming lineup. Its success enabled the show to be "exported" to other states, generating local versions such as Os Donos da Bola Rio (whose panel of commentators included Gérson and Dé Aranha) and Os Donos da Bola Minas, which discuss football within their respective regions. In 2025, the program was elected the Best Sports Program of the year by the website NaTelinha, receiving 59.1% of the votes.
