= CNT Tropical =

CNT Tropical (ZYB 398)

Londrina, Paraná; Brazil
- Channels: Digital: 47 (UHF); Virtual: 7
- Branding: CNT

Programming
- Affiliations: Central Nacional de Televisão

Ownership
- Owner: Organizações Martinez; (Rádio e Televisão OM Ltda.)

History
- First air date: March 15, 1979
- Former names: TV Tropical (1979-1993); CNT Londrina (1993-2017); TV JB Londrina (2007)
- Former channel numbers: Analog: 7 (VHF, 1979-2018)
- Former affiliations: Rede Globo (1979); Rede Bandeirantes (1979-1990); Rede Record (1990-1992); Rede OM (1992-1993); TV JB (2007)

Technical information
- Licensing authority: ANATEL
- ERP: 1.5 kW
- Transmitter coordinates: 23°19′31.9″S 51°11′30.1″W

Links
- Public license information: Profile
- Website: www.cnt.com.br

CNT Tropical is a Brazilian television station based in Londrina, a city in the state of Paraná. It operates on digital channels 7 VHF and 47 UHF, and is both an owned-and-operated station and co-generator of CNT. Founded in 1979 by José Carlos Martinez, it was the first station of the Martinez Organizations, and together with TV Paraná (today CNT Curitiba) it formed Rede OM in 1982, which constituted the current CNT.

== History ==
The station was founded as TV Tropical on March 15, 1979, by Oscar Martinez and his sons José Carlos Martinez and Flávio Martinez, through channel 7 VHF. Initially affiliated with TV Globo, it became affiliated with Rede Bandeirantes on December 1 of the same year, when it was emerging as a television network in several states at the time, and when TV Coroados, also belonging to the Martinez family, was sold to Rede Paranaense.

TV Paraná de Curitiba, managed by Ronald Sanson Stresser and Diários Associados, is put up for sale due to the conglomerate's financial crisis. The Martinez Organizations then offer themselves as buyers of the station. After intense negotiations, the station was finally purchased in April 1980, and became part of a small local network with TV Tropical. On July 18, with the end of Rede Tupi, TV Paraná unifies its affiliation with TV Tropical and both become affiliates of Rede Bandeirantes. In May 1982, when the Martinez Organizations concluded the restructuring phase at TV Paraná, Rede OM was officially founded, with the Curitiba broadcaster becoming the network head.

After the creation of the network, TV Tropical expanded its coverage area to several cities in the interior of Paraná, with the installation of microwave repeaters. In 1991, TV Tropical, TV Paraná and TV Maringá (founded in 1988) left Rede Bandeirantes and became affiliates of the newly created Rede Record. In 1992, with the purchase of TV Corcovado and satellite transmission, Rede OM left Rede Record and became an independent station, and consequently, a new television network, now with national coverage.

On May 23, 1993, Rede OM was renamed Central Nacional de Televisão (CNT). TV Tropical, in turn, was renamed CNT Londrina, although the name TV Tropical continues to be used to this day, but no longer officially.

In mid-2000, TV Tropical arrived in Brasília, and until then it would start to generate local and network programs such as Direto de Brasília, Jogo de Poder, Cidadão Tropical, Pop Clip, CNT News and CNT Jornal.

On April 17, 2007, CNT Londrina changed its name to TV JB Londrina through a partnership between Organizações Martinez and Companhia Brasileira de Multimídia, under the name TV JB.

In November 2017, the station was renamed and renamed CNT Tropical. The change made the broadcaster a content generator for retransmitters in Belo Horizonte and Brasília.

In 2021, with the worsening of the Crisis, CNT Tropical closed the doors of its headquarters in Brasília, becoming a mere relay. Political stories from Brasília started to be produced by CNT Rio de Janeiro.

== Technical information ==
Channel	Video	Aspect	Short name	Programming
7.1	1080i	16:9	CNT	Main CNT Curitiba programming / CNT

The station started its digital broadcasts on July 23, 2013, through physical channel 47, for Londrina and adjacent areas. Its local programs aren't produced in high definition.
