= Dé Aranha =

Brazilian footballer (born 1948)

Personal information
- Full name: Domingos Elias Alves Pedra
- Date of birth: April 16, 1948 (age 78)
- Place of birth: Paraíba do Sul, Brazil
- Position: Forward

Senior career*
Years	Team	Apps	(Gls)
1967–1970	Bangu		
1970–1973	Vasco da Gama		
1973–1975	Sporting CP		
1975–1977	Vasco da Gama		
1977–1980	Botafogo		
1980–1981	Al Hilal		
1982–1983	Bangu		
1983	Bonsucesso		
1983	Rio Branco		
1984	Desportiva Ferroviária		

Managerial career
- 1985: Rio Branco
- 1986–1987: Desportiva Ferroviária
- 1988–1989: Bangu
- 1989: Anapolina
- 1990: Fortaleza
- 1991: Itaperuna
- 1992: Bangu
- 1994: Botafogo
- 1995: Joinville
- 1995: Moto Club
- 2001: Botafogo
- 2005–2006: Duque de Caxias
- 2010: Olaria
- 2010: Rio Branco
- 2011: América
- * Club domestic league appearances and goals

Domingos Elias Alves Pedra, commonly known as Dé Aranha (born 16 April 1948), is a Brazilian former professional footballer who played as a forward for several Série A clubs.

Born in started his career in 1967 with Bangu, playing four served by Vasco da Gama, Sporting CP, Botafogo, Al Hilal, Bangu, Bonsucesso, Rio Branco and Desportiva Ferroviária. It was one of the attackers more opportunists in the 1970s. making success alongside Roberto Dynamite and having trained the various teams, among them Rio Branco, Bangu, Anapolina, Fortaleza, Botafogo, Joinville, Moto Club, Duque de Caxias, Olaria and América. Since 2014 acts as a commentator on the Band Rio version of the program the Os Donos da Bola and also in Bradesco Esporrtes FM was SBT, in 2014 and in the same year was Rádio Globo, where comment on programs and sports days of the broadcaster.

== Honours ==
=== Player ===
Vasco da Gama

- Campeonato Brasileiro Série A: 1974

Sporting CP

- Primeira Liga: 1973–74
- Taça de Portugal: 1973–74

Rio Branco

- Campeonato Capixaba: 1983, 1984, 1985

Al Hilal

- King Cup: 1980

=== Manager ===
Rio Branco

- Campeonato Capixaba: 2010
