= Central Nacional de Televisão =

Brazilian television network

Rede CNT
- Type: Free-to-air television network
- Country: Brazil
- Stations: List: CNT Curitiba; CNT Tropical; CNT Rio de Janeiro; CNT São Paulo; CNT Bahia; CNT RS
- Headquarters: Curitiba, Paraná, Brazil

Programming
- Language: Portuguese
- Picture format: 1080i (HDTV 16:9)

Ownership
- Owner: Organizações Martinez
- Key people: Flávio Martinez

History
- Launched: March 15, 1979
- Former names: TV Tropical (1979-1992); Rede OM (1992-1993); CNT/Gazeta (1999-2000); TV JB (2007)

Links
- Website: www.cnt.com.br

Availability

Terrestrial
- Digital UHF: List: 17 UHF (Salvador); 18 UHF (Belém, Brasília and Teresina); 19 UHF (Campo Grande); 20 UHF (Imperatriz); 21 UHF (Manaus); 24 UHF (Americana); 25 UHF (Aracaju and João Pessoa); 26 UHF (Florianópolis and São Paulo); 27 UHF (Rio de Janeiro); 28 UHF (Rio Branco); 31 UHF (Caxias do Sul); 32 UHF (Recife); 33 UHF (Cuiabá and Vitória); 38 UHF (Belo Horizonte); 43 UHF (Curitiba); 44 UHF (Natal); 47 UHF (Londrina and Porto Alegre); 46 UHF (Macapá)

Central Nacional de Televisão (lit. 'National Television Center'), also known as CNT and Rede CNT, is a Brazilian television network based in Curitiba, state of Paraná. Part of the Organizações Martinez Group, it aired for the first time in 1979 initially as TV Tropical.

== History ==
CNT was founded on March 15, 1979 by entrepreneur and politician José Carlos Martinez as a local station called TV Tropical, originally affiliated to Rede Globo until it was sold to Diários Associados in 1980. In 1982, the station was renamed as Rede OM, and was subsequently renamed as CNT in 1993 after becoming a national network the previous year. CNT is currently chaired by entrepreneur and politician (and brother) Flávio de Castro Martinez, who took over after José Carlos Martinez's death in 2003.

=== Partnership with Televisa ===
The television network CNT closed contract with the Mexican television network Televisa, airing the telenovela Manancial in August 2008.

=== Digital broadcasts ===
The CNT was the first to use this technology for its stations and affiliates starting in 1999. The stations comprising the network receive programming in digital quality using Embratel satellite channeling.

=== Crisis ===
As of 2026, the channel has extremely low ratings (averaging 0.1% share), with the channel leasing 22 hours of its daily schedule to the Universal Church of the Kingdom of God. Its limited programming outside of these slots consists of news and government advertising, with the news output being produced from Curitiba and Rio de Janeiro. CNT Esporte reached a record of 1.1% share on January 17, 2024, yet despite receiving donations from viewers, it doesn't surpass its average. All of its archives have been wiped - the archives were recorded using an expensive JVC format, which made archiving its output near impossible.
