= List of programs broadcast by SBT =

Sistema Brasileiro de Televisão (SBT) is a Brazilian free-to-air television network, funded on August 19, 1981, by the businessman and TV host Silvio Santos. The network was established after a public competition of the federal government for the creation of two new television networks, created from revoked concessions of the extinct networks Tupi and Excelsior. SBT was funded in the same day that the concession agreement was signed, and that the act was broadcast live by the network, so that this was its first aired program.

Currently, SBT is the thirteen most watched television network in Brazil, after TV Aparecida. Throughout its existence, the network previously occupied second place in the audience ranking, except between 2007 and 2014, when Rede Record took the post. SBT has about 8 owned and operated stations and 90 affiliated stations throughout the Brazilian territory, the network is also available through pay television operators (cable and satellite), by the free-to-air signal available in broadcast and satellite receivers, and also through streaming media in its mobile application (Android, iOS and Windows Phone), apps for smart TVs and in its website. Also on their website, the programming is available in video on demand for free, also available on the video-sharing site YouTube since 2010.

SBT broadcast in its programming a wide variety of television genres, whereas its own material generally stand adjacent to the entertainment. Foreign programming, is made up of mainly the telenovelas produced by the Mexican channel Televisa, American TV series, and Korean drama. It is the only commercial television broadcaster in Brazil which airs children's programming, even arranging a partnership deal with The Walt Disney Company, in which the company provides two hours of daily programming for the network. SBT also broadcast television news, producing in all three daily newscasts, a weekly news program and a weekly newscast.

== Current programming ==
=== Reality shows ===
Title	Presenter	Run
Bake Off Brasil	Nadja Haddad; Fabiana Karla	2015–present
Bake Off Celebridades	Nadja Haddad; Fabiana Karla	2021–present
Esquadrão da Moda (What Not to Wear)	Renata Kuerten; Lucas Anderi	2009–present
Fábrica de Casamentos	Chris Flores; Carlos Bertolazzi; Ana Furtado	2017–2020, 2026–present
Cozinhe se Puder - Mestres da Sabotagem (Cutthroat Kitchen)	Otaviano Costa	2021
Te Devo Essa! Brasil (Property_Brothers)	Dony De Nuccio; Renato Mendonça	2021
Wall Duet Brasil (The Wall Song)	Ratinho	2021–present
O Melhor (The Winner Is)	Ratinho	2022–present
Shadow Brasil	Raul Gil	2018–2024
Minha Mulher que Manda	Eliana; Celso Portiolli	2018–present
Drive Thru Okê	Eliana; Celso Portiolli	2022–present
The Voice Brasil	Tiago Leifert	2025–present
Love Taste – Receita para o Amor	Milene Pavorô; Carlos Bertolazzi	2026–present
Aeroporto: Área Restrita	César Filho	2026–present
Ex-Maridos Contra Ex-Mulheres	?	In project
Hotel dos Artistas (El hotel de los famosos)	?	In project

=== Game shows ===
Title	Presenter	Run
Gol Show	Silvio Santos; Silvio Luiz; Babi Xavier; Luís Ricardo; Ratinho	1997–2002, 2022–present
Roda a Roda Jequiti (Wheel of Fortune)	Patricia Abravanel; Rebeca Abravanel	2003–present
Programa Silvio Santos - Gincana (Takeshi's Castle)	Silvio Santos	2008–present
Show do Milhão	Silvio Santos; Celso Portiolli; Patricia Abravanel	1999–2009, 2021, 2024–present
Passa ou Repassa (Double Dare)	Celso Portiolli	2013–present
Quem Arrisca Ganha Mais	Celso Portiolli	2021–present
Comprar É Bom, Levar É Melhor	Celso Portiolli	2017–present
Topa um Acordo Pague Menos (Let's Make a Deal)	Celso Portiolli	2023–present
Até Onde Você Chega?	Celso Portiolli	2024–present
Quem Sabe Sobe!	Celso Portiolli	2026–present
Púlpitos da Sorte	Patricia Abravanel	2023–present
Quem Sabe Mais?	Patricia Abravanel	2026–present
Jogo do Mais ou Menos (Card Sharks)	Silvio Santos	2013–present
Nada além de Um Minuto (Minute to Win It)	Silvio Santos; Patricia Abravanel	2018–present
O Mais Fraco Vai Embora (Weakest Link)	?	In project

=== News programming ===
- No Alvo (2025–present)
- Primeiro Impacto (2016–present)
- SBT Brasil (2005–present)
- SBT Cidades (2026–present)
- SBT Notícias (1995, 2000–2003, 2013, 2016–2019, 2022, 2025–present)
- SBT Praça (1999–present)
- SBT Repórter (1995–2013, 2025–present)
- Se Liga, Brasil (2026–present)

=== Talk and variety shows ===
- Domingo Legal (1993–present)
- Eita Lucas! (2025–present)
- Fofocalizando (2016 as "Fofocando"–present)
- Notícias Impressionantes (2020–present)
- Operação Mesquita (2017–present)
- Programa do João (2025–present)
- Programa do Ratinho (1998–2006, 2009–present)
- Programa Silvio Santos (1981–2001, 2008–present)
- The Noite com Danilo Gentili (2014–present)
- Viva a Noite (1982–1992, 2007, 2026–present)
- Sabadão de Todos (2026–present)
- Sessão +SBT (2026–present)
- Sessão +SBT Show (2026–present)

=== Children's programming ===
- Sábado Animado (1995–present)
- O Picapau Amarelo (2024–present)
- A Pracinha (2025–present)

=== Comedy ===
- A Praça É Nossa (1987–present)
- Comédia SBT (2026–present)

=== Seasonal programs ===
- Retrospectiva (2002–present)
- SBT Folia (2011–present)
- Teleton (1998–present)
- Troféu Imprensa (1982–present)

=== Series ===
- Clube do Chaves
- El Chapulín Colorado
- El Chavo del Ocho
- The Chosen
- Titans

=== Sports ===
- Box Aberto (2026–present)
- Galvão Futebol Clube (2026–present)
- SBT Sports (2021–present)

Coverage sports

- Copa do Nordeste (2018–present)
- UEFA Champions League (2021–present)
- UEFA Supercup (2021–present)
- CONMEBOL Sudamericana (2023–present)

=== Prize draw ===
- Tele Sena (1991–present)
- Acelere com o Baú (2025–present)
- Milzão da Felicidade (2025–present)

=== Telenovelas ===
- Amor valente
- O que la vida me robó (reruns)
- Marimar (reruns)
- Marisol (reruns)

=== Independent programming ===
- Pé na Estrada (reruns; 2020–present)

== Former programming ==
=== News programming ===
- Aqui Agora (1991–1998, 2008, 2025–2026)
- Alô Você (2025–2026)
- Boletim de Ocorrências (2009–2010)
- Chega Mais Notícias (2024)
- Comando da Madrugada (1986–1994)
- Conexão Repórter (2010–2020)
- Documento Especial: Televisão Verdade (1992–1995)
- First Class (1996–1997)
- A Grande Ideia (2012)
- Jornal 24 Horas (1981–1988)
- Jornal da Massa (2007)
- Jornal da Semana SBT (2013–2017, 2019–2024)
- Jornal do SBT (1991–2016)
- Noticentro (1981–1988)
- Notícias da Manhã (2014–2015)
- Notícias da Última Hora (1996–1998)
- Notícias do Dia (1998–2000)
- Noticidade (1998)
- Pesca & Cia (1990–1998)
- Poder em Foco (2018, 2019–2021)
- SBT Agro (2024–2025)
- SBT Manchetes (2007)
- SBT Manhã (2005–2015, 2025–2026)
- SBT News (2023–2025)
- SBT Notícias Breves (2005)
- SBT Realidade (2007–2009)
- SBT Rural (2003–2006)
- Sinal / CBS Telenotícias (1997–2000)
- TJ Brasil (1988–1997)
- TJ Internacional (1990–1992)
- TJ Manhã (1988–1990, 2001–2003)
- TJ Noite (1988–1990)
- TJ Praça (1988–1991)
- Últimas Notícias (1981–1988)

=== Sports ===
- Acelerados (2015–2021)
- Arena SBT (2014, 2020–2025)
- Esporte Mágico (1993–1995)
- Jogo Duro (2006)
- SBT Esporte (1990, 1993–1996)
- Vrum (2008–2015)

Coverage sports

- FIFA World Cup (1986–1998;2026)
- Summer Olympics (1984–1996)
- FIFA World Cup qualification (1985–1993)
- Copa do Brasil (1995–1998)
- Torneio Rio-São Paulo (1997–1998)
- Copa Mercosur (1998)
- Copa CONMEBOL (1995–1997)
- Copa dos Campeões Mundiais (1995–1997)
- Copa Master de CONMEBOL (1996)
- Copa de Oro (1996)
- Festival Brasileiro de Futebol (1997)
- Torneio Maria Quitéria (1997–1998)
- Campeonato Paulista (1984; 2003)
- CONCACAF Gold Cup (2003)
- South American Youth Football Championship (2003)
- Copa Libertadores (1981–1984, 2020–2022)
- Campeonato Carioca (finalS in 2020, 2024 before matches of Vasco in home)
- Copa América (1989;2021)
- UEFA Europa League (2021–2024)
- UEFA Conference League (2021–2024)
- Copa América Femenina (2022)
- CART World Series (1995-2000)
- Indy NXT (1997–2000)
- Masters GP (2006)
- Boxing (1993–1996)
- Ultimate Fighting Championship (2002)

=== Independent programming ===
- Brasil Caminhoneiro (2012–2019)
- Clube Irmão Caminhoneiro Shell (1989–1995)
- Pesca Alternativa (2004–2014)
- Planeta Turismo (2014–2015)
- Sempre Bem (2019–2022)
- Siga Bem Caminhoneiro (1995–2008)
- Tô de Férias (2017-2018)
- Turismo e Aventura (2015–2017)

=== Children's programming ===
- Bom Dia & Cia (1993–2022, 2023, 2025)
- Carrossel Animado (2007–2013, 2015–2016, 2016–2017)
- Casa da Angélica (1993–1996)
- Cine Disney (1988–1993)
- Clube do Carrossel (2013)
- Curtindo com Crianças (2007–2008)
- Desenhos Pré-Escola (2015)
- Disney Club (1997–2001)
- Disney CRUJ (2001–2002)
- Domingo Animado (2007–2010. 2025-2026)
- Domingo Série (2022–2024, also an Sábado Série)
- Do Ré Mi com Vovó Mafalda (1991–1992)
- Do Ré Mi Fá Sol Lá Si (1988–1991)
- Feriadão SBT (2011–2015, 2023–2025)
- Férias com Patati Patata (2012)
- Festival de Desenhos (1998–1999)
- Festolândia (1991–1992; 1999–2005)
- A Hora Warner (2001–2007)
- Mariane (1990–1991)
- Mundo Disney (2015–2018)
- Oradukapeta (1987–1990)
- Programa Bozo (1981–1991, 2013)
- Programa da Maisa (2019–2020)
- Programa Sérgio Mallandro (1994–1996)
- SBT Apresenta: Luccas Toon (2024–2025)
- Sessão Carrossel (1985–1989)
- Sessão Desenho (1981–2007, 2018–2019)
- Show da Simony (1989–1990)
- Show Maravilha (1987–1994)

=== Talk and variety shows ===
- Acontece Lá em Casa (2017)
- Almoço com as Estrelas (1981–1983)
- Alô, Christina (1997–1998)
- Big Domingo (1991–1992)
- Canta e Dança, Minha Gente (1999–2002)
- Casos de Família (2004–2026)
- Charme (2004–2008)
- Chega Mais (2024)
- Circo do Tiru (2024–2025)
- Cocktail (1991–1992)
- O Conquistador do Fim do Mundo (2003)
- Corrida Maluca (1989–1991)
- De Frente com Gabi (1998–2000, 2002–2004, 2010–2015)
- Disco de Ouro (2002–2003)
- Domingugu (1993)
- Eliana (2009–2024)
- Em Nome do Amor (1994–2000)
- É Tudo Nosso! (2024)
- Fala Dercy (2000)
- Falando Francamente (2002–2004)
- Fantasia (1997–2000, 2007–2008)
- Gabi Quase Proibida (2013–2014)
- Hebe (1986–2010)
- O Homem do Sapato Branco (1981–1983)
- Hot Hot Hot (1994–1995)
- Jogo das Famílias (1981–1984)
- Jô Soares Onze e Meia (1988–1999)
- Márcia (1997–1998)
- Moacyr Franco Show (1981–1983)
- Mundo Pet (2014–2015)
- Musicamp (1987)
- Nações Unidas (1992–1993)
- Novos Talentos (1984)
- Okay Pessoal!!! (2014–2016)
- Olha Você (2008–2009)
- Paradão Sertanejo (1994–1995)
- Perfil (1988–1992; 1993–1998)
- Porta da Esperança (1984–1996)
- O Povo na TV (1981–1984)
- Programa Cor-de-Rosa (2004)
- Programa de Vídeos (1992–1993)
- Programa Ferreira Netto (1981–1982)
- Programa Flávio Cavalcanti (1983–1986)
- Programa Livre (1991–2001)
- Programa Raul Gil (1981–1984, 2010–2024)
- Programa Silvia Poppovic (1990–1992)
- Quer Namorar Comigo (1992–1994)
- Rei Majestade (2006–2007)
- Rouge: A História (2002)
- Sabadão (1991–2002)
- Sabadão com Celso Portiolli (2015–2017)
- Sabadou com Virginia (2024–2026)
- SBT Podnight (2024–2026)
- Show da Gente (2009–2010)
- Show da Tarde (1983–1984)
- Show de Calouros (1981–1996)
- Show do Ratinho (2000–2001)
- Show sem Limite (1981–1985)
- Tempo de Alegria (1997–1999)
- Tentação (1994–2009)
- Topa Tudo por Dinheiro (1991–2001)
- Triturando (2020–2021)
- TV Animal (1988–1992, 1995–1996, 2009–2010)
- TV Informátika (1985)
- TV Powww! (1984–1989)
- Uma Noite em Portugal (1984–1988)
- Vem pra Cá (2021–2022)
- Ver para Crer (2006–2007)
- Xaveco (1997–2001, 2003–2004, 2019–2020)

=== Comedy ===
- Alegria 81 (1981–1983)
- Campeonato de Humoristas (2010)
- Dedé e o Comando Maluco (2005–2008)
- A Escolinha do Golias (1990–1997)
- Meu Cunhado (2004–2006)
- Ô... Coitado! (1999–2000)
- Reapertura (1981–1984)
- Sem Controle (2007)
- Veja o Gordo (1987–1990)

=== Movie blocks ===
- 8 e Meia no Cinema (2005–2009)
- Cine Belas Artes (2001–2017)
- Cine Espetacular (2000–2025)
- Cine Família (2011–2015)
- Cinema como no Cinema (1987–1990)
- Cinema de Domingo (1993–1998)
- Cinema de Graça (1994, 2021–2022)
- Cinema em Casa (1988–2011, 2023–2026)
- Cinespecial (2000)
- Duas Sessões (1986–1995)
- Feriadão SBT (2011–2014)
- Festival de Filmes (1988–1991, 1996–2004)
- Fim de Noite (1995–2008)
- Hoje no Cinema (2007–2009)
- LM Legendado (1984–1994)
- Longa Metragem Épico (1985–1986)
- Made for TV (2001–2003)
- Quarta no Cinema (1995–1996)
- Quinta no Cinema (1986–1995, 2003–2006)
- Sabadocine (2009–2010)
- Sábado Cine (1986–1987; 1994–1995)
- Sábado Legendado (1997)
- Sessão das Dez (1985–1998, 2003–2004)
- Sessão das Dez e Meia (2004–2005)
- Sessão das Nove Premiada (1981–1983)
- Sessão Meia-Noite (2022)
- Sessão Premiada (1981–1986, 2000–2007)
- Sessão Renato Aragão (2021–2022)
- Toda Noite no Cinema (2006)
- Tela de Sucessos (1997–2024, 2025–2026)
- Top Cine (1991–1997, 1998–2000)
- Última Sessão (1985; 2002–2003)

=== Serie blocks ===
- Ataque de Risos (2006–2016)
- Séries Premiadas (2003–2007)
- Tele Seriados (2007–2016)

=== Religious ===
- Bom Dia Esperança (2025–2026)

=== Special ===
- 30 Anos de Chaves (2011)
- A Descida do Papai Noel (1982)
- Branca de Neve e os Sete Peões (2004)
- Chaves: Especial de Ano Novo (2011)
- Dia De Festa (2011)
- Dia no Parque (2012)
- Especial Maisa (2009)
- A Fantástica Máquina de Sonhos (2021)
- Festival SBT 30 Anos (2011)
- Mansão Bem Assombrada (2015)
- Maria Teresa Especial (1993)
- Miss Brasil (1981–1989)
- Parada do Dia das Crianças (1986–1988)
- Parque do Gugu (1996)
- A Pracinha (2022)
- SBT Palace Hotel (2002)
- Super Paradão (1992)
- Telefone & Ganhe (2010)

== Reality shows/Game shows ==
- Bake Off Brasil
- Júnior Bake Off Brasil
- Bake Off Brasil Celebrity
- BBQ Brasil (BBQ Champ)
- Hell's Kitchen: Cozinha sob Pressão
- Roda a Roda Jequiti (Wheel of Fortune)
- Programa Silvio Santos (Takeshi's Castle)
- Passa ou Repassa (Double Dare) - (Domingo Legal)
- Pra Ganhar É Só Rodar
- Fábrica de Casamentos
- Jogo das Fichas
- Nada além de Um Minuto (Minute to Win It)
- Rola ou Enrola? - (Eliana)
- Fenômenos - (Eliana)
- Esquadrão da Moda (What Not to Wear)
- Bomba! (Boom!) - (Programa Silvio Santos)
- Cabelo Pantene - O Reality (2017–2018)
- Qual é o Seu Talento? (What's Your Talent?)
- Caldeirão da Sorte (2016–2017)
- Duelo de Mães (2016–2017)
- Dance se Puder (2016) - (Eliana)
- Máquina da Fama (2013–2017)
- Esse Artista Sou Eu (Your Face Sounds Familiar) (2014)
- Festival Sertanejo (2013–2014)
- Menino de Ouro (Football's Next Star) (2013–2014)
- Famoso Quem? (My Name Is) (2013)
- Vamos Brincar de Forca (2012–2013)
- Cante se Puder (Sing If You Can) (2011–2013)
- Se Ela Dança, Eu Danço (So You Think You Can Dance) (2011–2012)
- Esquadrão do Amor (2011–2012)
- Um Milhão na Mesa (The Million Pound Drop) (2011)
- Cantando no SBT (2011)
- SOS Casamento (2011)
- Romance no Escuro (Dating in the Dark) (2010–2011) - (Eliana)
- Solitários (Solitary) (2010)
- Meu Pai é Melhor que Seu Pai (My Dad Is Better Than Your Dad) (2010)
- Topa ou Não Topa (Deal or No Deal) (2006–2011)
- Um Contra Cem (1 vs. 100) (2009–2010)
- Você Se Lembra? (Amne$ia) (2009–2010)
- 10 Anos Mais Jovem (10 Years Younger) (2009)
- Identidade Secreta (Identity) (2009)
- Só Falta Esposa (2009)
- Astros (2008–2013)
- Supernanny (2008–2010)
- Nada Além da Verdade (The Moment of Truth) (2008–2010)
- Quem Manda É o Chefe (2008–2009)
- High School Musical: A Seleção (2008)
- Tentação (2007–2009)
- Você É mais Esperto que um Aluno da Quinta Série? (Are You Smarter than a 5th Grader?) (2007–2008)
- Quem Perde, Ganha (The Biggest Loser) (2007)
- Vinte e Um (Twenty-One) (2007)
- Namoro na TV (The Dating Game) (2007)
- Curtindo com Reais (2007)
- Curtindo com Crianças (2007)
- Você É o Jurado (2007)
- Ídolos (SBT) (Idols) (2006-2007)
- Bailando por um Sonho (2006)
- Family Feud Brasil (Family Feud) (2005–2006)
- Casamento à Moda Antiga (2005–2006)
- O Grande Perdedor (2005)
- O Conquistador do Fim do Mundo (2003)
- Xaveco-Se Rolar...Rolou (Singled Out) (1996–2001, 2003–2004)
- Todos contra Um (2002–2005)
- Popstars Brasil (Popstars) (2002–2003)
- Ilha da Sedução (Temptation Island) (2002–2003)
- Sete e Meio (Seven and a half) (2002)
- Curtindo uma Viagem (2001–2002)
- Casa dos Artistas (Protagonistas) (2001–2004)
- Audácia (Greed) (2000)
- Qual É a Música? (The Singing Bee) (1999–2008)
- Nações Unidas (1992–1993)
- Cidade contra Cidade (1988–1989)
- Ídolos (Idol) (2006–2007)
- Casa dos Segredos (Secret Story) (future)
- Cinquenta (50–50) (uncertainty)
