= Show do Milhão =

Brazilian game show

- Also known as: Jogo do Milhão (1999); Show do Milhão PicPay (2021)
- Genre: Game show
- Created by: Silvio Santos
- Directed by: Célia Trevisan
- Presented by: Silvio Santos (1999–2003; 2009); Celso Portiolli (2021); Patrícia Abravanel (2024–)
- Narrated by: Luiz Lombardi
- Country of origin: Brazil
- Original language: Portuguese
- No. of seasons: 8

Production
- Executive producer: Sergio Chirstophe
- Camera setup: Multi-camera setup
- Running time: 44 minutes

Original release
- Network: SBT
- Release: 7 November 1999 – 23 October 2003
- Release: 8 July – 9 September 2009
- Release: 8 September 2024

Related
- Who Wants to Be a Millionaire? franchise by David Briggs, Mike Whitehill, and Steven Knight

Show do Milhão is a Brazilian television game show that was created by Silvio Santos. The show, which resembles the format of Who Wants to Be a Millionaire?, features a quiz competition in which contestants attempt to win a top prize of R$1,000,000 by answering a series of increasingly difficult multiple-choice questions.

The program was presented by Silvio Santos and broadcast by SBT throughout its entire initial run, from 7 November 1999 to 23 October 2003. During this period, it achieved major success. The first revival lasted from July to September 2009, but was cancelled due to low viewership. A second revival began in 2021. It was sponsored by fintech firm PicPay and hosted by Celso Portiolli. This version also underperformed in ratings and was shelved after one season. Most recently, in 2024, the show returned with Silvio Santos's daughter, Patrícia Abravanel, as host. The first episode of this version premiered on 8 September, and aired on the variety show Programa Silvio Santos, which she also hosts.

As the first Brazilian game show to offer a top prize of R$1,000,000, the show contributed to SBT's highest ratings in its history. During the late 1990s and early 2000s, SBT was the second most-watched network in Brazil, behind Rede Globo. However, near the end of the show's initial run, the network began to lose viewers to Rede Record and Rede Bandeirantes. SBT did not regain second place until 2014.

== History ==
The first season was advertised in September 1999 with a teaser campaign that said 'the 22 days are coming,' without revealing further details. In early September, while Silvio Santos was in the United States, he called SBT executives to instruct them to air the promo. Shortly before the premiere, it was announced that the program would debut on 7 November 1999, clarifying that the '22 days' referred to 22 episodes. Beginning with the second season, the game show was renamed Show do Milhão.

The game show gained a sponsorship agreement with Nestlé in 2002. Under this agreement, participation shifted to using Nestlé's products instead of the Show do Milhão magazine, which ceased its publication. The new season premiered on 1 May 2002. In 2003, SBT announced a reformulation that included a new set and elements from another game show, Sete e Meio, in an attempt to save the show.

== Format ==
No.	Value		
No.	1999–2003, 2021	2009	2024-
1	R$1,000	R$ 500	R$1,000
2	R$2,000	R$ 600	R$2,000
3	R$3,000	R$700	R$3,000
4	R$4,000	R$800	R$4,000
5	R$5,000	R$900	R$5,000
6	R$10,000	R$1,000	R$10,000
7	R$20,000	R$2,000	R$20,000
8	R$30,000	R$3,000	R$30,000
9	R$40,000	R$4,000	R$40,000
10	R$50,000	R$5,000	R$60,000
11	R$100,000	R$6,000	R$80,000
12	R$200,000	R$10,000	R$100,000
13	R$300,000	R$20,000	R$200,000
14	R$400,000	R$30,000	R$300,000
15	R$500,000	R$40,000	R$400,000
16	R$1,000,000	R$50,000	R$500,000
17		R$60,000	R$1,000,000
18		R$100,000	
19		R$200,000	
20		R$300,000	
21		R$400,000	
22		R$500,000	
23		R$600,000	
24		R$1,000,000	

Twelve potential contestants were introduced by the host and assigned a number between 1 and 12. The host then drew a number from a box, and the contestant wearing that number was called down from the gallery to the stage.

In the quiz competition, the goal was to answer 16 consecutive multiple-choice questions (24 in the 2009 version, 17 in the 2024 version), each one more difficult than the last. The contestant faced each question with four possible answers and needed to choose the correct one to continue. Answering correctly earned the contestant the value of that question. Answering incorrectly halved their total prize fund. During the game, the contestant was able to use a set of four ajudas (helps, like 'lifelines' in Who Wants to Be a Millionaire). Three of these could be used only once:

- Cartas (Cards): 4 playing cards were presented face down to the contestant (one King, one Ace, one 2 and one 3). The contestant was allowed to flip only one card, which eliminated any wrong answers corresponding to the revealed card (selecting a King did not eliminate any wrong answers, while selecting a 3 automatically advanced the contestant to the next question).
- Convidados (Guests): The host asked three university students the same question one at a time; each student could give a different answer. Also sometimes referred to as "Universitarios" (University students), especially in the 2024 version.
- Placas (Placards): The host reread the question and the four possible answers to the contestants sitting in the gallery, who then had to hold up a card corresponding to the number of a particular response; this is analogous to the Ask the Audience lifeline on the original version of Millionaire.
- Pula (Jump): The contestant was allowed to swap the current question for a new one; this could be done up to 3 times during the game.
- Assistente virtual (Virtual assistant, introduced 2024): The contestant can consult an AI virtual assistant, Alex, to find information related to the answer.
- (Skip, introduced 2024): This allows the contestant to completely bypass a level.

Contestants were allowed to stop and take the money after seeing all the questions. At the end of each game, the contestant in control chose the next player by drawing a number. This was done in the same way as at the start of the show.

The rules changed slightly for the R$1,000,000 question. The contestant in control was shown only the question and the four possible answers. They were not allowed to use any lifelines. Instead, the contestant was given 20 seconds to study the question before deciding whether to answer and risk all the money or stop the game and leave with R$500,000. An incorrect answer caused the contestant to lose all of their winnings.

The same rules as the original version were used in the 2009 revival, but the contestant had to answer 24 questions to win R$1,000,000, up from 16.

=== Notable contestants ===
Only one contestant answered the R$1,000,000 question correctly: Sidiney Ferreira Moraes in October 2003.

== Cancelled children's version ==
On 9 February 2017, SBT announced that Show do Milhão would be revived as a children's game show with Patricia Abravanel as presenter. The children's version was cancelled in August 2017 before it aired a single episode due to Rede Globo's acquisition of an official Brazilian version of Millionaire.

== Revival ==
The game show was revived in 2021 as Show do Milhão PicPay and presented by Celso Portiolli. Under the sponsorship agreement with PicPay, users had to download the app. If a transaction of over R$50 was made, they would be eligible to participate, as determined by Caixa Econômica Federal. During the season, which aired between September and November 2021, transactions totaled R$2.4 million. This amount was divided among 312 eligible users.

On 18 June 2024, SBT announced the return of Show do Milhão in 2025, with Patrícia Abravanel as presenter. However, shortly after Silvio Santos's death, the revival was moved forward, and the first episode aired on 8 September 2024.

In January 2025, SBT announced a new season of Show do Milhão, hosted again by Patrícia Abravanel. The tentative premiere date was set for May 4. The show aimed to compete against Globo in the 11pm slot after the end of Big Brother Brasil 25. A total of thirteen programs were scheduled. Ratings would determine if a third series of the revival was viable, which could air in the second half of 2025.
