= Programa Silvio Santos =

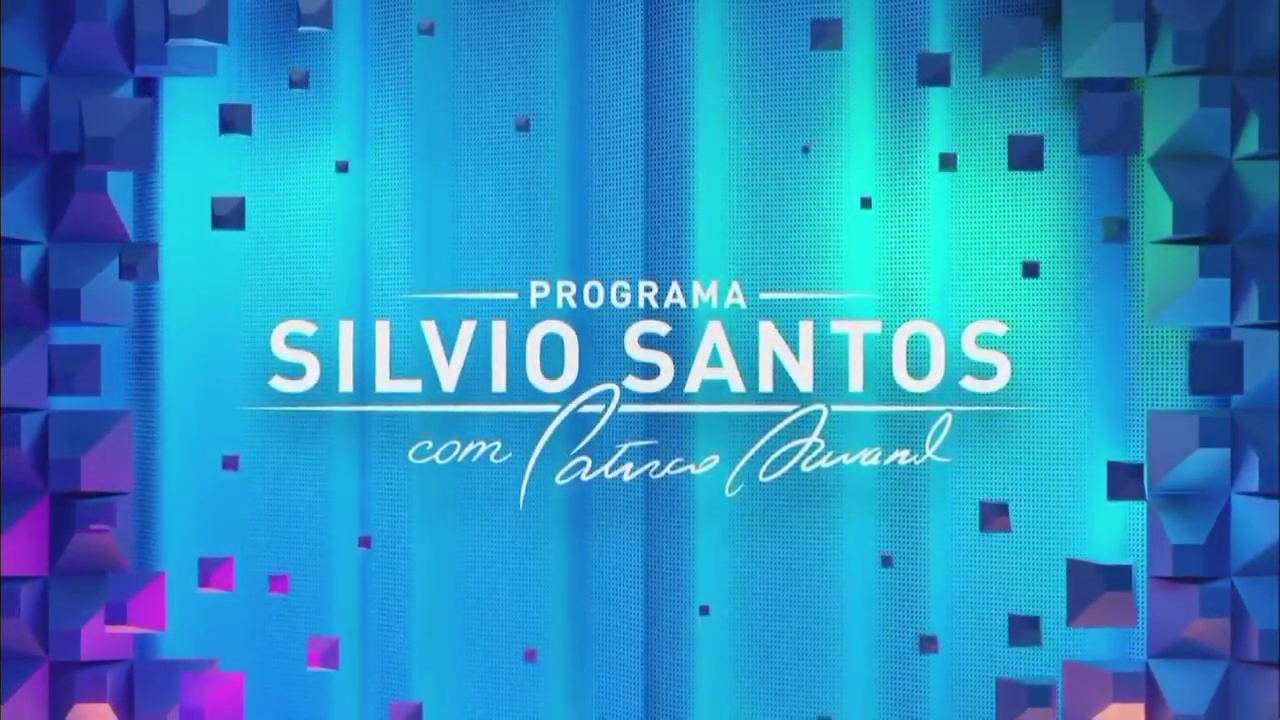
- Also known as: Programa Silvio Santos com Patrícia Abravanel (Note: On March 3, 2023, after a photo of the recordings was leaked by a Twitter user, the panel with the program's logo was exposed, now containing Patrícia Abravanel's signature. On March 5th, during the broadcast of the episode, Patrícia announced that Silvio Santos would still present the program, but adopting a rotation scheme with his daughter, dismissing rumors of retirement until his death on August 17, 2024.)
- Genre: Variety show
- Created by: Silvio Santos
- Based on: Mosaico na TV by Rede Tupi de Televisão
- Directed by: Fabiano Wicher
- Creative director: Roberto Manzoni
- Presented by: Silvio Santos (1963–2023); Patricia Abravanel (2021–present)
- Starring: Ballet do SBT
- Voices of: Liminha
- Narrated by: Liminha
- Theme music composer: Archimedes Messina (1963-2024); Maestro Pica Pau e seu Banda Silvio Santos (2024-present)
- Opening theme: "Silvio Santos vem aí" by Archimedes Messina (1963-2024); Maestro Pica Pau e seu Banda Silvio Santos (2024-present)
- Ending theme: Ritmo de festa (1993-2001, 2008-2011, 2024-); Esta chegando hora (2013-2022); Temas do Programa (2023-)
- Composers: Archimedes Messina; Maestro Pica Pau e seu Banda Silvio Santos
- Country of origin: Brazil
- Original language: Portuguese
- No. of episodes: 3,195

Production
- Executive producer: Silvana Colossi
- Production locations: São Paulo, Brazil; Buenos Aires, Argentina
- Running time: 240 minutes
- Production company: SBT

Original release
- Network: TV Paulista (1963–1966); Rede Globo (1966–1976); Rede Tupi (1976–1980); TVS (1976–1981); REI/TVS-Record (1976–1987); SBT (1981–present)
- Release: June 2, 1963 – present

Programa Silvio Santos, billed since 2023 as Programa Silvio Santos com Patricia Abravanel, is a Brazilian variety show broadcast by SBT. Created and originally hosted by Brazilian entertainer Silvio Santos, it has been hosted since 2023 by his daughter Patricia Abravanel.

The show consists of various segments featuring games, challenges, musical competitions, pranks, performances, and other elements. At points in its history, Programa Silvio Santos was structured as a programming block to encompass Sunday afternoon programs presented by Santos and other SBT talent, as well as other imported programming and sports broadcasts. In 2008, the program was relaunched as a singular variety show; presently, it airs in prime time on Sunday nights.

Originally premiering on June 2, 1963, on TV Paulista, it ranks behind only Mosaico na TV as one of the longest-running programs on Brazilian television.

== History ==
=== 1960s ===
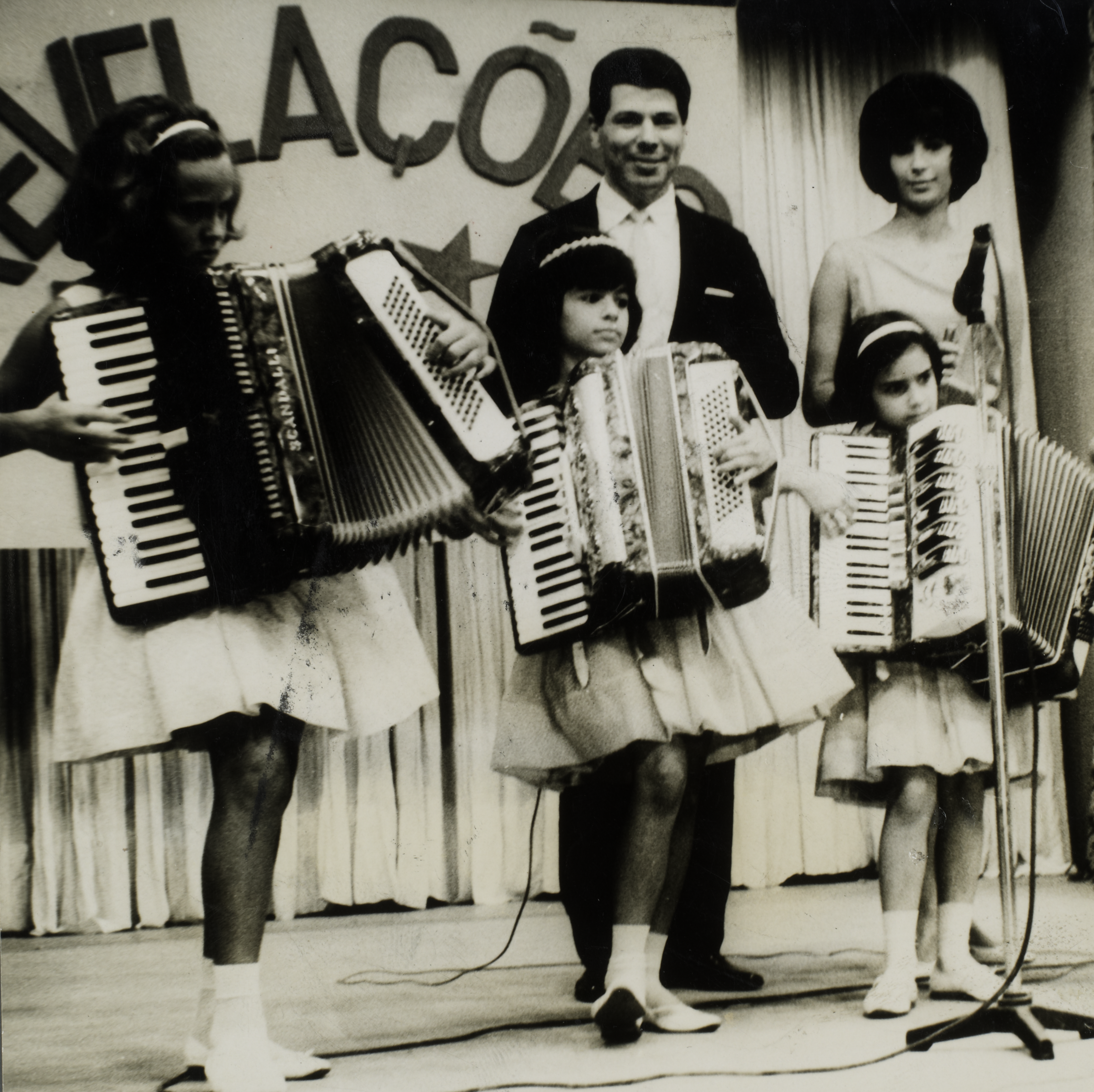
Silvio Santos in the 1960s

Silvio Santos began his television career on June 3, 1960, by purchasing airtime on São Paulo's TV Paulista to promote his Baú da Felicidade savings plan through the program Vamos Brincar de Forca. This half-hour show aired on Monday nights and featured clients who were chosen from a lottery after paying their monthly installments on time, a strategy still used today. These clients participated in a game of hangman to win prizes like household goods, toys, appliances, and gift certificates redeemable at Baú stores. Three years later, Silvio acquired two hours of Sunday programming on TV Paulista, and on June 2, 1963, he debuted the Programa Silvio Santos. The show initially consisted of three segments: Cuidado com a Buzina, a talent competition for male, female, and child performers judged by a panel who would "honk" a buzzer to reject contestants, or, if approved, seat them in classic car replicas on stage; Roda Pião, a game where Baú clients spun a numbered top to win prizes, a format currently used in the show Pra Ganhar é Só Rodar; and Justiça dos Homens, which dramatized real cases sent in by viewers and concluded with a final verdict from famous people.

The show gained more airtime on TV Paulista as Silvio purchased more hours of Sunday programming. This expansion led to new segments, including Festival da Casa Própria, which raffled off homes to customers of the Baú savings plan; Rodada de Ouro, a word-guessing game where participants could win a final gold bar; and Pergunte e Dance, a quiz show with a dance penalty for incorrect answers. Due to the financial difficulties of Organizações Victor Costa, their assets, including TV Paulista, were sold to Organizações Globo in 1965. At that time, Programa Silvio Santos was already five hours long, expanding to eight hours by the end of the decade. On March 24, 1966, TV Paulista was sold to Roberto Marinho, becoming a Rede Globo station. The show continued to air only in São Paulo until July 1969, when it was added to Rede Globo's national schedule. It subsequently achieved an 89-point rating, the fifth-highest in Brazilian TV history, which established Silvio as a celebrity and transformed Baú da Felicidade into a sales phenomenon.

=== 1970s ===
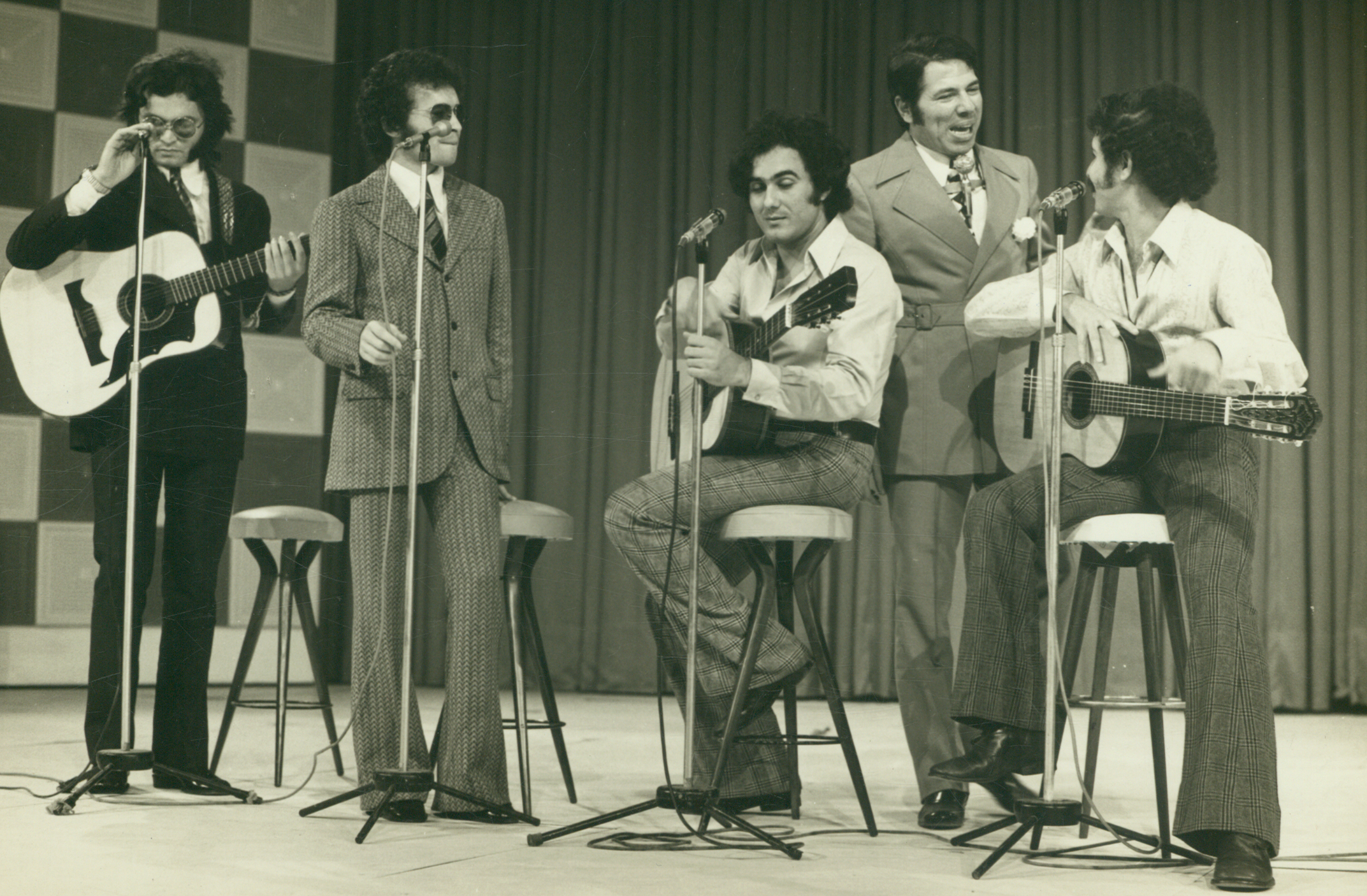
Silvio Santos with the duos Dom and Ravel (standing) and Antônio Carlos and Jocafi (seated), 1972.

The show gradually expanded to approximately 10 hours in length. Although he paid for the airtime, Silvio's relationship with Globo was strained by the network's "quality standard", an increase its focus on higher-quality and in-house programming such as films, telenovelas, news, and sports. Directors Walter Clark and Boni wanted to fill the time slot with their own shows and advertisers. This conflict fueled Silvio's ambition to launch his own TV channel.

In 1972, shortly after renewing his contract for five more years, Silvio Santos purchased half of TV Record's shares from businessman Pipa Amaral. However, because his contract with Globo prohibited him from being a shareholder in a competing network, he used a proxy, Joaquim Cintra Gordinho, who managed the presenter's stake alongside partner Paulo Machado de Carvalho. The transaction was not revealed until 1976, the year Silvio left Globo, leading to a legal dispute that he won. A year earlier, on October 22, 1975, Silvio also won a public bidding process for VHF channel 11 in Rio de Janeiro, inaugurating TVS Rio de Janeiro on May 14, 1976. With guaranteed broadcast in São Paulo and Rio, Silvio terminated his contract with Rede Globo just before its expiration. The final Programa Silvio Santos broadcast on Rede Globo aired on July 25, 1976, after more than 16 years. Silvio also leased Sunday programming from Rede Tupi, which was already in financial distress, to ensure the show's broadcast outside the Rio-São Paulo axis until April 1982. On August 1, 1976, Programa Silvio Santos began airing on Tupi and TVS Rio de Janeiro.

=== 1980s and 1990s ===
On February 3, 1980, Programa Silvio Santos also began to be re-broadcast by São Paulo's TV Record. With the federal government's liquidation of Rede Tupi in 1980, the show aired on that network for the last time on July 13, continuing on the remaining Diários Associados stations and those owned by the host. Silvio participated in the public tender that would establish new television networks, winning concessions in São Paulo, Belém, and Porto Alegre, along with a second channel in Rio de Janeiro. The Sistema Brasileiro de Televisão (SBT) was launched on August 19, 1981, and Programa Silvio Santos began airing on the new network on August 23. The show continued to be broadcast simultaneously on TV Record and its partner station in Rio de Janeiro starting April 4, 1982. In June 1985, after SBT gained its own satellite channel, Programa Silvio Santos began to be transmitted simultaneously throughout Brazil. With his own television network nationally consolidated, Programa Silvio Santos ceased airing on TV Record on July 26, 1987. This was part of a process that began in 1984, in which Silvio Santos divested his stake in the network, selling his shares to businessman Edir Macedo in 1989. In the same year, Programa Silvio Santos lost its Sunday audience leadership to its new competitor, Domingão do Faustão, which quickly restored Rede Globo's status after Silvio's departure in 1976. In 1990, Programa Silvio Santos also ceased airing on TV Corcovado in Rio de Janeiro, whose programming was leased to Grupo Abril, making its broadcast exclusive to SBT. Silvio sold TV Corcovado in 1992 to the emerging Rede OM, now CNT.

During this period, Programa Silvio Santos transitioned from being a variety show to a programming block consisting primarily of individual game shows hosted by Santos, such as Show de Calouros, Domingo no Parque, Roletrando, Namoro na TV, Porta da Esperança, Topa Tudo por Dinheiro, Gol Show, Tentação, Hot Hot Hot, Qual é a Música?, TV Animal, Viva a Noite, Em Nome do Amor, and Show do Milhão. From the 1980s onward, Silvio gradually made room for other hosts, notably Gugu Liberato, who for many years also hosted Sunday afternoons. Over the years, dozens of programs within the block were hosted by Silvio Santos himself, as well as by Gugu, Silvio Luiz, Celso Portiolli, Luís Ricardo, Hebe Camargo, Ratinho, Otávio Mesquita, and others. The block also featured comedy programs, American series, movies, soccer matches, and coverage of the Indy Racing League (Formula Indy).

=== 2000s ===
Starting in the early 2000s, Silvio Santos began to reduce his Sunday airtime, and by 2006, he was only hosting the Tele Sena lottery drawing on that day. Consequently, he started presenting shows that aired during the week, primarily on Wednesdays, such as Show do Milhão, Roda a Roda, Family Feud, Todos contra Um, Pra Ganhar É Só Rodar, Sete e Meio, Eu Compro o Seu Televisor, and Rei Majestade. In 2007, Silvio returned to a more prominent role on Sundays on SBT, with the comeback of programs like Tentação, Roda a Roda, and Qual É a Música?, along with the debut of Nada Além da Verdade.

On June 1, 2008, Programa Silvio Santos returned to being a singular variety show, which included classic games from Silvio's career, aquatic park challenges, and the popular Pergunte para a Maísa segment, where the host asked general questions to then 6-year-old Maisa Silva. On August 30, 2009, with the debut of the Eliana show in the afternoons on SBT, Programa Silvio Santos was moved to its current 8:00 p.m. time slot. That same year, Silvio Santos began reintroducing classic musical themes from his career, such as "Ritmo de Festa" and "Silvio Santos vem aí."

=== 2010s ===
On July 4, 2010, the program introduced a new set. On August 14, 2011, prior to SBT's 30th anniversary, Silvio Santos's daughter, Patrícia Abravanel, also became a regular on Jogo dos Pontinhos, replacing Luiz Henrique's character Mamma Bruschetta. The program received another new set on March 18, 2012. On March 10, 2013, to commemorate its 50th year on the air, the show debuted a new set with a new logo and brought back the classic theme song, "Silvio Santos Vem Aí." The show consistently implemented new technologies and segments, and starting in 2012, Silvio's playful and often shocking antics, such as his pants falling down on camera, helped boost the program's ratings. On August 25, 2013, an on-screen announcement revealed a schedule change to an earlier time, but due to a drop in audience, the show returned to its previous slot the following week. In 2014, Silvio transitioned from his traditional chest microphone to an ear-worn model, and since 2015, he has used a lapel microphone. On March 29, 2015, a new season premiered with a new set and logo, with the show now broadcasting in HDTV.

On October 26, 2016, it was announced that the program would be broadcast internationally in Portuguese-speaking African countries. During a new season premiere on March 19, 2017, Silvio was hit by a giant ball thrown by the audience, an incident that went viral. In 2017, Programa Silvio Santos secured second place in national ratings, showing continuous growth since 2013. The program's average viewership was 41% higher than in 2013. On June 2, 2018, the show celebrated its 55th anniversary, solidifying its status as the world's longest-running program with the same host. That October, Silvio announced the return of the "Baby Contest," a segment from the defunct 1980s show Domingo no Parque.

=== 2020s ===
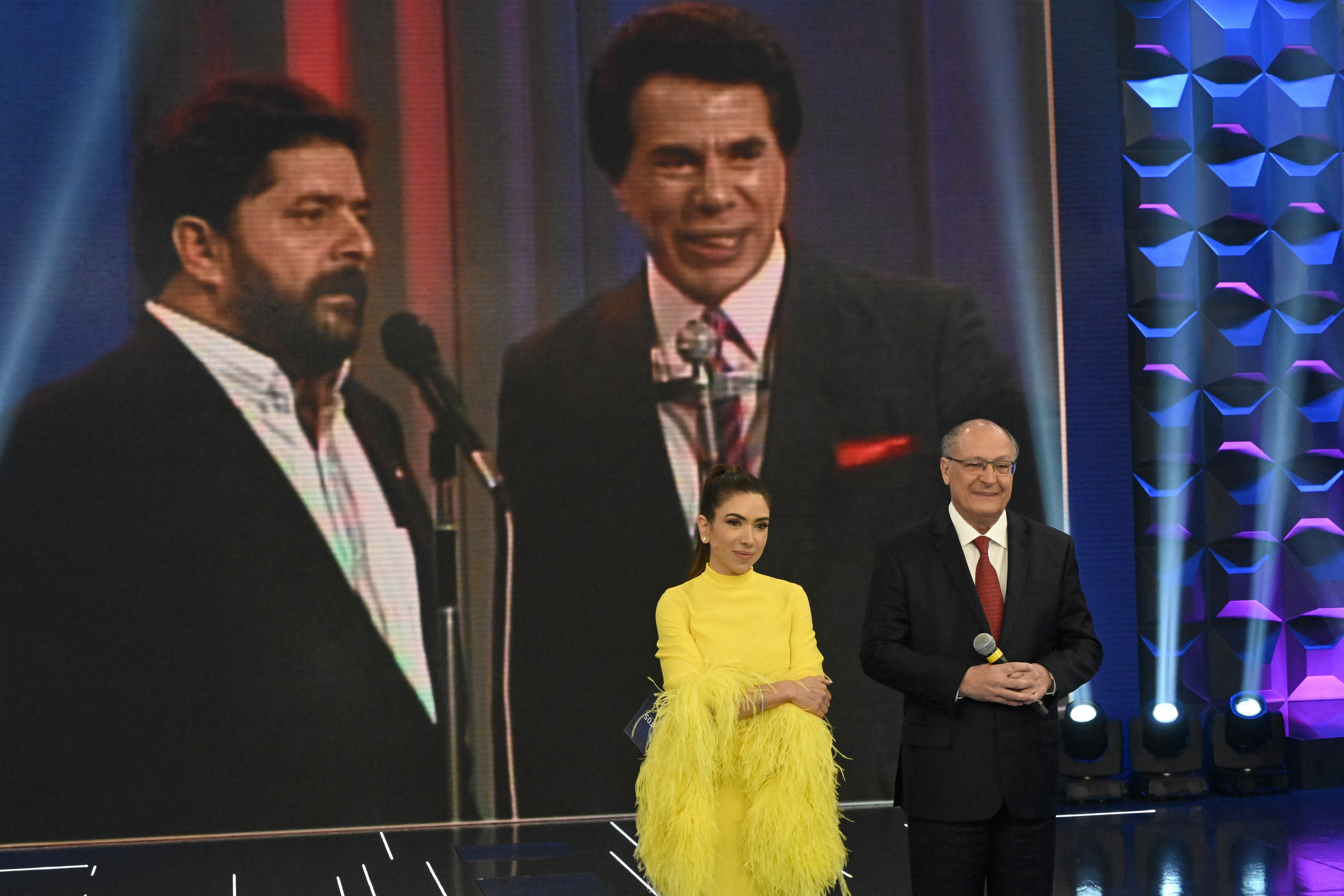
Geraldo Alckmin and Patrícia Abravanel in a tribute to the Programa Silvio Santos' 60th anniversary in 2023

Production of the program was suspended in 2020 due to the COVID-19 pandemic; SBT aired reruns of past episodes in its place. Between May and August 2021, Programa Silvio Santos aired clip shows focusing on memorable moments from Silvio's career in television as a whole, including segments from programs such as Em Nome do Amor, Show do Milhão, and Topa Tudo por Dinheiro.

On August 1, 2021, Programa Silvio Santos aired its first new episode since 2020. However, production was suspended once more after Silvio contracted COVID-19, resulting in the program returning to reruns and compilations until October. On October 3, 2021, the show returned with Patrícia Abravanel as a guest host; initially, the episodes featured segments presented by Patrícia, mixed with segments that had been recorded by Silvio before production was suspended. Patrícia herself later tested positive for COVID-19 on October 7, temporarily suspending new recordings, though she resumed on October 18. During her time off, reruns and previously unaired practical jokes were broadcast.

On April 26, 2022, Silvio Santos returned to the program for the first time in eight months; in what was deemed as a symbolic passing of the torch to his daughter, Silvio participated in an edition of the Jogo das Três Pistas segment hosted by Patrícia, against his SBT colleague Ratinho. His return would be brief; in September 2022, Silvio recorded his final episode of Programa Silvio Santos, which aired on February 26, 2023; at this time, Patricia took over as the permanent host, with its title changed accordingly to Programa Silvio Santos com Patricia Abravanel. On June 4, the program aired a 60th anniversary special, which featured appearances by various celebrity guests and dignitaries, including Vice President Geraldo Alckmin. Following the end of the Eliana show on June 23, 2024, the program's airtime was extended from 7 p.m. to midnight starting June 30. On August 17, Silvio Santos died at the age of 93. He had been hospitalized since the beginning of August with H1N1, and his cause of death was bronchopneumonia following the flu. Despite Silvio's death, the show's original title was kept as a tribute to the founder of SBT.

== Presenters ==
Silvio Santos shared hosting duties on his show with several other presenters. His brother, Léo Santos, who was a radio host on Rio de Janeiro's Rádio Mundial, eventually hosted Programa Silvio Santos. Léo began working with Silvio in a bureaucratic capacity but by the 1970s, he was presenting segments and filling in for his brother on both radio and television. Another occasional host in the 1970s was Manuel de Nóbrega. As videotape became more accessible, Silvio began pre-recording more segments, reducing the need for stand-in hosts during his time off.

In 1988, Silvio stepped away from television due to a vocal cord issue. He convinced Gugu Liberato not to debut on Globo and to instead return to SBT, where Gugu began hosting segments of Programa Silvio Santos. Since 2022, Silvio's daughter, Patrícia Abravanel, has been the main host of the show on SBT.

== Accolades ==
Year	Award	Category	Recipient	Result	Ref.
2014	Prêmio F5	Presenter of the Year	Silvio Santos	Nominated	
2015	Troféu Imprensa	Best Auditory TV Show	Programa Silvio Santos	Won	
2016	Troféu Imprensa	Best Auditory TV Show	Programa Silvio Santos	Won	
2017	Troféu Imprensa	Best Auditory TV Show	Programa Silvio Santos	Won	
2018	Prêmio Contigo! Online	Best Auditory TV Show	Programa Silvio Santos	Won	
2025	Troféu Imprensa	Best Auditory TV Show	Programa Silvio Santos	Nominated	
2025	Troféu Imprensa	Female Presenter of the Year	Programa Silvio Santos	Won	
2025	Troféu Internet	Best Auditory TV Show	Programa Silvio Santos	Won	
2025	Troféu Internet	Female Presenter of the Year	Patrícia Abravanel	Won	
