= Mundo Disney =

Portuguese television output, 2015–2018

- Network: Disney
- Launched: 31 August 2015
- Closed: 31 August 2018
- Country of origin: Brazil
- Major broadcasting contracts: SBT
- Original language(s): Portuguese
- Official website: Official website

Mundo Disney was a block of cartoons, series and films shown by SBT, which entered into a partnership with The Walt Disney Company to display these contents. The block debuted on 31 August 2015 and was shown on SBT until 31 August 2018. The Block broadcast daily programming created by Disney itself and vignettes were shown, commercials and calls for the block's attractions, in a format similar to the Disney group's paid channels. From Monday to Sunday, the block showed cartoons and productions from Disney channels.

The agreement marks a partnership between the two companies, which have been distant for ten years, after Disney left SBT and signed a contract with TV Globo. In addition, the agreement also provides that all revenue from the time slot is owned by Disney. On 13 August 2018, it was announced that Disney terminated its contract with SBT. The block remained online until 31 August 2018, the day the partnership began in 2015.

== Attractions displayed ==
- Mickey Mouse Clubhouse
- The Lion Guard
- Sheriff Callie's Wild West
- Art Attack
- Austin & Ally
- Cinema Sunday
- Doc McStuffins
- DuckTales
- Elena of Avalor
- Rapunzel's Tangled Adventure
- Hannah Montana Forever
- Henry Hugglemonster
- Jake and the Never Land Pirates
- Juacas
- Junior Express
- Handy Manny
- Mickey Mouse
- Mickey and the Roadster Racers
- Miles from Tomorrowland
- Muppet Babies (2018)
- I Didn't Do It
- Ninjago
- Once
- Wizards of Waverly Place
- The 7D
- Operation Big Hero: The Series
- Parquinho
- Phineas & Ferb
- Pijama Party
- Sofia the First
- Puppy Dog Pals
- ¡Qué talento!
- Soy Luna
- Vampirina
- Violetta
- Zack & Cody: Twins on Board
- The Suite Life of Zack & Cody

== Court hearing ==
In the first month since the premiere of Mundo Disney, SBT's audience gradually fell on Sundays. After six months on air, SBT's average audience fell. The first highlight in the hearing came only in June 2016, after other TV stations competing with SBT interrupted their programming to broadcast the Dilma Rousseff impeachment process. After the positive highlight of June, negative audience ratings for the block were once again recorded.

In the same month, journalist Flávio Ricco's comment was reported in the press, which said: "What is already certain is that the "Mundo Disney" is no longer as secure in SBT's programming as before. The money offered to purchase these time slots is far from compensating for the losses caused to daily and weekend audiences. The information is that Silvio Santos himself is already convinced of this."
