= Topa ou Não Topa =

- Created by: Dick de Rijk; John de Mol
- Presented by: Silvio Santos; Roberto Justus; Patricia Abravanel
- Composer: GROOVEWORX
- Country of origin: Brazil
- No. of series: 4
- No. of episodes: 197

Production
- Camera setup: Multiple-camera setup
- Running time: 60 minutes

Original release
- Network: SBT
- Release: 6 August 2006 – 28 June 2020

Topa ou Não Topa (Portuguese pronunciation: [ˈtɔpɐ ow nɐ̃w ˈtɔpɐ]) is the Brazilian version of Deal or No Deal, broadcast in Portuguese by SBT. It is hosted by Silvio Santos. There are 26 cases, containing amounts from 50 centavos (US$0.16) to R$1,000,000 (US$320,000). On August 25, 2010, the game show returned and the host is Roberto Justus but in similar set to the old version.

Like most sets of Brazilian versions of US game shows, their set and graphics are a dead ringer to the American counterpart.

The R$1,000,000 grand prize was won by a man named Paulo in April 2007.

== Eu Compro O Seu Televisor ==
A unlicensed Brazilian version of Deal or No Deal in 2004, called Eu Compro Seu Televisor (lit. I Buy Your Television), also hosted by Silvio Santos and broadcast by SBT. Instead of suitcases like US version, the format of the show was very similar to the Italy version, except use 20 televisions instead of boxes, with certain values, from R$1 to R$1,000,000, and also featured quiz round.

In July 2004, Endemol International filed an injunction against SBT. The injunction was revoked and the show continued on the air until July 28, 2004.

== Case values ==
2006–2011

R$0.50 R$1 R$5 R$10 R$25 R$50 R$75 R$100 R$200 R$300 R$400 R$500 R$750	R$1,000 R$5,000 R$10,000 R$25,000 R$50,000 R$75,000 R$100,000 R$200,000 R$300,000 R$400,000 R$500,000 R$750,000 R$1,000,000

2019–present

R$1 R$5 R$10 R$20 R$25 R$50 R$75 R$100 R$200 R$300 R$400 R$500 R$750	R$1,000 R$2,500 R$5,000 R$10,000 R$20,000 R$30,000 R$40,000 R$50,000 R$100,000 R$200,000 R$300,000 R$400,000 R$1,000,000
