= TV Continental =

Defunct Brazilian television station

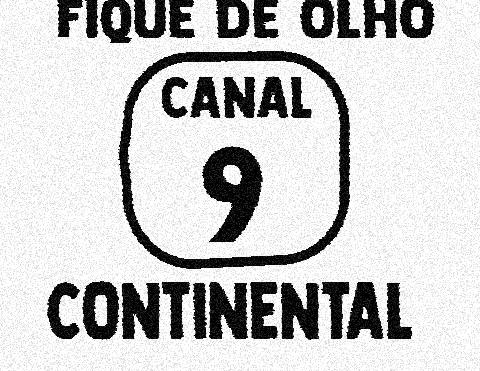
- Rio de Janeiro; Brazil
- Channels: Analog: 9 (VHF)

Programming
- Affiliations: Independent

Ownership
- Owner: Organização Rubens Berardo

History
- First air date: June 30, 1959
- Last air date: December 17, 1971

Technical information
- Licensing authority: DENTEL

TV Continental was a Brazilian television station based in Rio de Janeiro, formerly the federal capital and later the state of Guanabara. It operated on VHF channel 9 and was the city's third TV station, opened in 1959 by state deputy for the then Federal District Rubens Berardo. At the beginning of the 1970s, finding itself in a bad financial situation, Continental closed its activities and had its concession revoked.

== History ==
After the broadcast of a friendly match between the Brazilian and English football teams as a preview, on May 13, 1959, which took place at the Estádio Jornalista Mário Filho, TV Continental in Rio de Janeiro was inaugurated at 7 pm on June 30, in a ceremony that was attended by the then President of the Republic Juscelino Kubitschek. The station, with generalist programming, with different formats, was located in a space in the Laranjeiras neighborhood used by the film production company Flama, of which Rubens Berardo was also the owner, and one of its studios was the largest in Brazil. With a film department, the channel had modern technical conditions for developing films.

Six months after its launch, Continental was the first TV station in the country to use videotape, through a demonstration at the Copacabana Palace hotel presented by Carlos Pallut, its director of journalism, and Riva Blanche, directed by Haroldo Costa.

Journalist Heron Domingues next to a TV Continental camera; in 1966 he was a tenant at the station

The station had an extensive artistic department, mainly responsible for musicals and teletheaters. Some of its actors came from TV Paulista, with which it had signed an agreement. However, the number of employees in the sector shrank as the channel experienced financial problems, resulting in strikes due to lack of payment. In 1966, Continental was leased, for six months, to journalist Heron Domingues to reverse the financial mismanagement in which it found itself. At that time, artists migrated to other stations that offered better salaries.

At the beginning of the 1970s, the station was evicted from its space and moved to a property in the Vila Isabel neighborhood, later generating its signal directly from an external truck in front of the Grajaú Tênis Clube. With a one-hour program broadcasting only films, the channel went off the air in September 1971, returning on November 19th with the transmission of educational programs for children produced by the Educational Television Service of the Department of Education of Guanabara (at the time a state located in the old city of Rio) between 7pm and 9pm, which was interrupted on December 17 due to the discontinuity of the broadcaster's operations.

On February 22, 1972, then president Emílio Garrastazu Médici signed a decree revoking Continental's concession following a suggestion from the National Telecommunications Council (CONTEL), which monitored the channel's situation and claimed that, in addition to being off the air, it had requested bankruptcy granted by the Court.

Subsequently, Continental's transmitter, tower and antenna were put up for auction and purchased by businessman and television presenter Silvio Santos to open his first broadcaster, TVS, in Rio de Janeiro in 1976. It was discovered that the equipment for transmitting the old channel already operated in color, before the PAL-M system was launched in Brazil in 1972.
