= Troféu Imprensa =

Brazilian television productions award

Press Trophy
- Awarded for: Outstanding performance and production value by actors, telenovelas and TV programs in the previous year.
- Country: Brazil
- Hosted by: Silvio Santos (1970-2022) Patricia Abravanel (2025) Celso Portiolli (2025)
- First award: 1958
- Website: sbt.com.br/trofeuimprensa

Television/radio coverage
- Network: SBT

Troféu Imprensa (English: Press Trophy) is an award presented annually by SBT, to honor the best Brazilian television productions, including telenovelas. Until 2014, it is claimed to be the "Oscar of Brazilian Television". Even though it is more in common with the Emmy Awards than the Academy Awards itself, the award presented a replica of the Oscar statuette up until 2017.

== History ==
The Troféu Imprensa is the oldest Brazilian award and is regarded as one of the most prestigious in the country. Following the end of the São Paulo magazine TV, Plácido transferred the rights to the Troféu Imprensa to presenter and businessman Silvio Santos. From 1970 up until the last ceremony until his death in 2024 (2022), Santos has been responsible for organizing, producing, and hosting the award, which is broadcast annually by SBT. On February 26, coinciding with Carnival Sunday, SBT registered the Troféu Imprensa for copyright protection. This move aimed to prevent copyright-related incidents that had occurred in previous productions.

== Awards ==
- Best Telenovela
- Best Actor of Telenovela
- Best Actress of Telenovela
- Best Male Singer
- Best Female Singer
- Best Male TV Host
- Best Female TV Host
- Best Talk Show
- Best Comedy TV Show
- Best Children's TV Show
- Best Newscast
- Best Newscast Host
- Best Documentary TV Show
- Best Auditory TV Show
- Best TV Commercial
- Best Musical Group
- Best Song
- Best Country Duo
- Newcomer of the Year (Best New Artist)

== Editions ==
The first edition of the Troféu Imprensa took place in 1958, created by journalist Plácido Manaia Nunes. Initially, before being televised, the award ceremony was held at the Municipal Theatre of São Paulo.

During the 1960s, the ceremony was broadcast by TV Tupi. In the 1970s, it became part of the Programa Silvio Santos on Rede Globo, hosted by Silvio Santos. After Santos left Globo in 1976, the award was not held between 1978 and 1980. It returned in 1981, broadcast by RecordTV, where Santos was a shareholder at the time.

Since 1982, the award has been aired on Santos’ own network, the Sistema Brasileiro de Televisão (SBT).

In 2003, the ceremony was aired in two parts and at an unusual time due to legal issues that prevented the broadcast of the Sunday show Domingo Legal. As a result, the award was re-aired in full the following weekend.

In 2006, the award was not held due to scheduling conflicts involving Silvio Santos and the jury. It was also canceled in 2020 and 2021 due to the COVID-19 pandemic.

In 2022, the ceremony was held for the first time on a Wednesday.

In 2023, the award was again postponed due to internal restructuring at SBT following Silvio Santos’ absence from programming and operations. Initially rescheduled for 2024 with Patrícia Abravanel as host, the event was further delayed to 2025 due to lack of time to finalize nominees, especially for the Troféu Internet.

In its return after a two-year hiatus, both Patrícia Abravanel and Celso Portiolli were confirmed as hosts, and the award adopted a new format. Additionally, the ceremony was made available on Disney+, marking another major innovation.

== See also ==
- Latin American television awards
