= Tiago Abravanel =

Brazilian actor, voice actor and singer

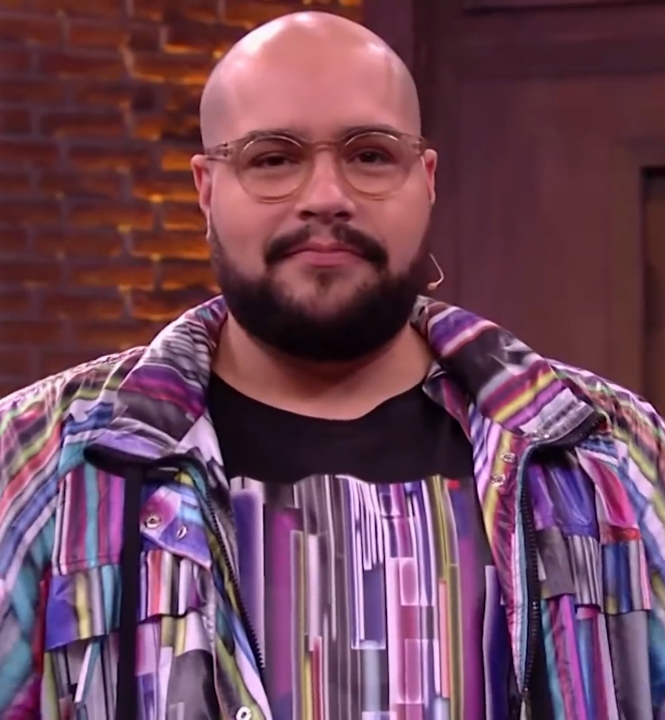
- Abravanel in 2021
- Born: Tiago Donato Abravanel Corte Gomes; 21 October 1987 (age 38); São Paulo, Brazil
- Education: Anhembi Morumbi University
- Occupations: Actor, voice actor, singer
- Years active: 2004–present
- Spouse: Fernando Poli (m. 2022)
- Relatives: Silvio Santos (grandfather); Patricia Abravanel (half-aunt); Íris Abravanel (stepgrandmother)

Tiago Donato Abravanel Corte Gomes (born 21 October 1987) is a Brazilian actor, voice actor and singer. He is the grandson of the late TV show host and owner of SBT, Silvio Santos.

== Career ==
=== Filmography ===
Television
Year	Title	Role
2011–12	Amor e Revolução	Davi
2012–13	Salve Jorge	Demir
2013	Dança dos Famosos 10	Himself (Contestant)
2013–14	Joia Rara	Odilon Mascarenhas
2015–16	Chapa Quente	Francelino "Fran" Lima
2017	Popstar	Himself (Backstage host)
2021	Super Dança dos Famosos	Himself (Contestant)
2022	Big Brother Brasil 22	Himself (Housemate)
2022	Queen Stars	Himself (Judge)

Film
Year	Title	Role
2012	Wreck-It Ralph	Ralph (Brazilian voice)
2016	The Jungle Book	King Louie (Brazilian voice)
2016	The Secret Life of Pets	Duke (Brazilian voice)
2018	Ralph Breaks the Internet	Ralph (Brazilian voice)
2019	The Secret Life of Pets 2	Duke (Brazilian voice)

Theatre
Year	Title	Role
2007–08	Miss Saigon	The Engineer
2009–10	Hairspray	Mr. Pinky
2011–12	Tim Maia – Vale Tudo	Tim Maia
2024	Hairspray	Edna Turnblad
