= Íris Abravanel =

Brazilian entrepreneur, journalist and screenwriter

Iris Pássaro Abravanel
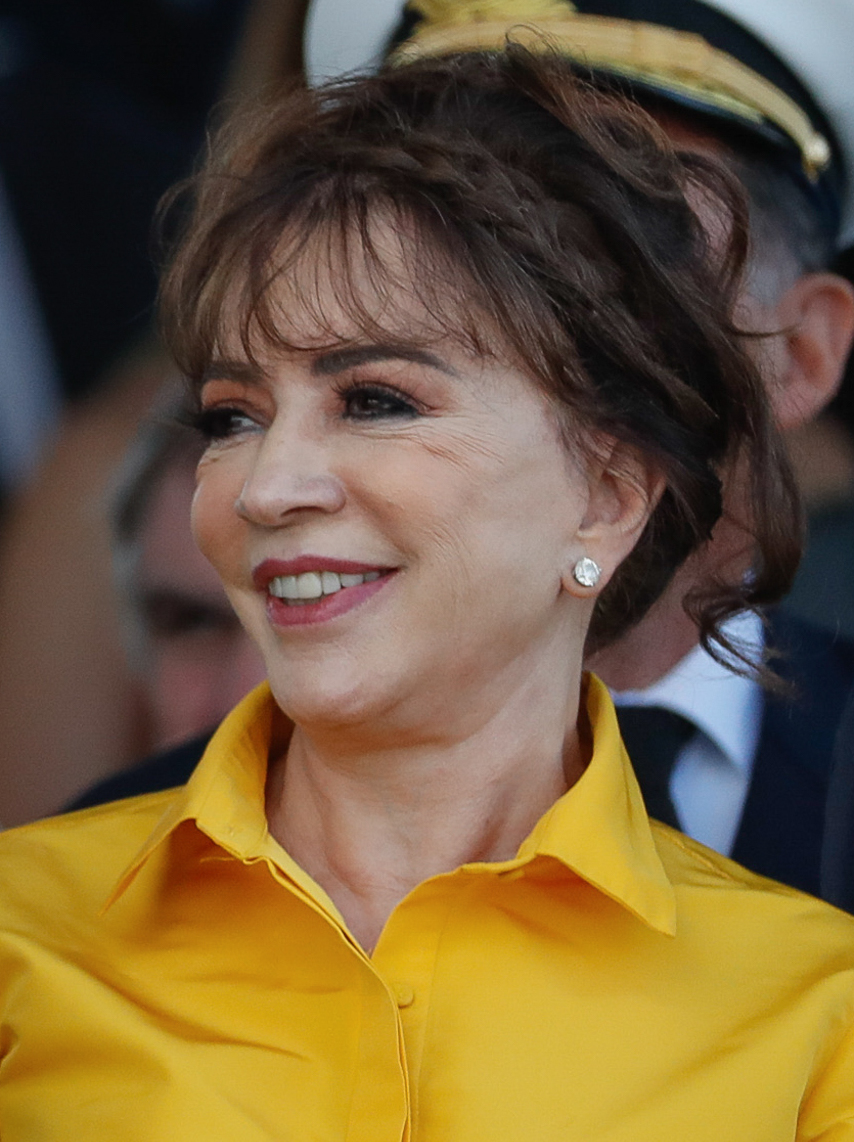
- Born: July 26, 1948 (age 78); São Paulo, Brazil
- Occupations: Entrepreneur, Journalist, Writer, Showrunner
- Years active: 2007–present
- Notable work: Carrossel; Chiquititas; Cúmplices de um Resgate; As Aventuras de Poliana
- Spouse: Silvio Santos (m. 1978; died 2024)
- Children: Daniela, Patrícia, Rebeca, Renata
- Relatives: Tiago Abravanel (stepgrandson); Fábio Faria (son-in-law); Alexandre Pato (son-in-law)

Iris Pássaro Abravanel (born 26 July 1948) is a Brazilian entrepreneur, journalist, writer, and showrunner, renowned for her contributions to children and youth literature, particularly in the realm of telenovelas, also known for being the widow of presenter Silvio Santos, to whom she was married from 1978 to 2024.

== Personal life ==
Abravanel initiated a romantic relationship with Silvio Santos in 1974, shortly after his separation from his first wife, Maria Aparecida Vieira. Despite rumors of meeting in an elevator during her employment at Baú da Felicidade, they actually met on a beach. Facing familial opposition due to Santos' divorce, age gap, and fame, they officially married in 1978, eventually raising four daughters together: Daniela, Patrícia, Rebeca, and Renata.

In 1992, the couple experienced a one-year separation due to Santos' excessive jealousy but later reconciled.

== Career as an author ==
Abravanel's journey as an author began in 2007 when Silvio Santos, facing challenges in television ratings, was encouraged by columnist Walcyr Carrasco to collaborate on a novel. Embracing this suggestion, she debuted as a telenovela author in 2008 with Revelação, supervised by Yves Dumont.

Returning to scriptwriting in 2009, she adapted radio scripts by Janete Clair, with Del Rangel directing. In 2010, she wrote the telenovela Corações Feridos, which premiered in November.

In 2012, Abravanel ventured into remakes, starting with the highly successful Carrossel, followed by Chiquititas, Cúmplices de um Resgate, Carinha de Anjo, and As Aventuras de Poliana, showcasing her flair for children and youth dramas.

Her latest works include Poliana Moça in 2022 and the 2023 debut of A Infância de Romeu e Julieta, based on William Shakespeare's classic.
