= Celso Portiolli =

Brazilian television presenter and radio host

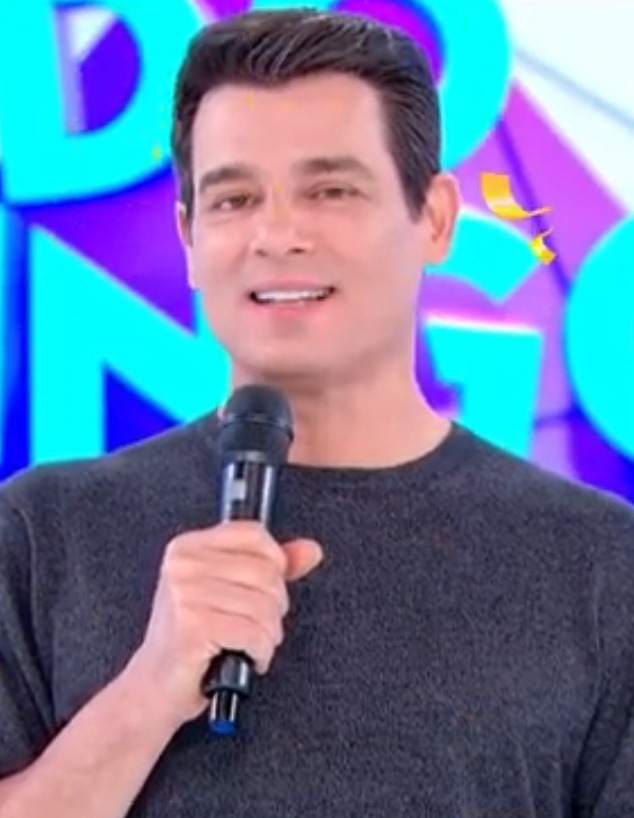
- Celso in 2021
- Born: Celso Yunes Portiolli; June 1, 1967 (age 59); Maringá, Paraná, Brazil
- Other name: Portiolli
- Occupations: Presenter; Broadcaster; Businessman; YouTuber
- Years active: 1984-present
- Notable work: Domingo Legal
- Height: 1.85 m (6 ft 1 in)
- Spouse: Suzana Marchi
- Children: 3
- Website: www.celsoportiolli.com.br

Celso Yunes Portiolli (born 1 June 1967) is a Brazilian television presenter, broadcaster, businessman, YouTuber, former comedian, former politician and former television writer, hired by SBT, he is the presenter of the programs Domingo Legal and Show do Milhão. Portiolli is also the owner of the radio station Optimal FM, which has three stations in the interior of the state of São Paulo.

He began his radio career in 1984, working at stations in Paraná, Minas Gerais, Mato Grosso do Sul and São Paulo. In Ponta Porã, he became audience leader and director of a local radio station. His popularity was so great in the city that in 1992, aged 24, he was elected councilor with one of the highest votes in the municipality.

== Career ==
Portiolli's dream has always been to appear on the small screen. Therefore, in 1993, he sent a tape to Silvio Santos, with hidden camera suggestions for Topa Tudo por Dinheiro. Of the 11 ideas he sent, 7 were approved, which aroused the interest of Sistema Brasileiro de Televisão, which soon invited him to work as a writer for the program.

Later, in April 1996, the opportunity arose to present Passa ou Repassa, replacing Angélica, who moved to Rede Globo. The attraction remained on the air until 1998 and returned to the grid a year later until 2000. In 2001, Celso presented other programs, such as Tempo de Alegria, Xaveco and Fantasia. The following year, came one of his biggest hits, Curtindo uma Viagem, the audience leader in 2002. In 2003, he led a reality show called O Conquistador do Fim do Mundo. At the end of 2004, he was in charge of Sessão Premiada, a program in which he interacted with viewers by telephone and gave cash prizes. Portiolli alternated between being runner-up and leading the audience on Saturday afternoons.

The following year, he was invited to lead the Fama Code, an attraction that chose the best child singer in the country and entered him in a final with children from various Latin American countries that took place in Mexico.

In the following years, he hosted several programs such as Charme, Namoro na TV, Curtindo com Reais, Curtindo com Crianças and Ver para Crer. In 2009, Portiolli took over the presentation of Domingo Legal in place of Gugu Liberato, who transferred to Rede Record. In 2015, after Domingo Legal lost two hours of duration, SBT decided to create another program for Celso, this time on Saturday nights, with the name Sabadão com Celso Portiolli, a program that yielded reasonable ratings. In early 2017 the program was taken off the air after almost 2 years.

After 12 years, SBT returned to show Show do Milhão, in September 2021. The program airs on Friday nights, Celso was chosen to present the program.

In March 2016 he debuted his YouTube channel which, in 4 months, reached the mark of 1 million subscribers.

== Personal life ==
Portiolli married Suzana Marchi in 1992. They have three children together: Laura Portiolli (born in 2000), Pedro Henrique Portiolli (2003) and Luana Portiolli (2006).

In December 2021, Portiolli received treatment for bladder cancer; he has been informed that he is cured.

== Filmography ==
=== TV shows ===
Year	Show	TV station
1996 – 2000	Passa ou Repassa	SBT
1997 – 1998	Tempo de Alegria	SBT
1998 – 2001	Xaveco	SBT
2000	Fantasia	SBT
2001 – 2002	Curtindo uma Viagem	SBT
2003	O Conquistador do Fim do Mundo	SBT
2004 – 2006	Sessão Premiada	SBT
2005	Código Fama	SBT
2006	Ver para Crer	SBT
2006 – 2007	Charme	SBT
2007	Namoro na TV	SBT
2007	Curtindo com Reais	SBT
2007	Curtindo com Crianças	SBT
2008 – 2009	Campeonato de Perguntas	SBT
2009 – presente	Domingo Legal	SBT
2015 – 2017	Sabadão com Celso Portiolli	SBT
2022 – 2026	EL ÚLTIMO PASAJERO	DRAMA Pham Viet Dung
2023 – 2026	O ÚLTIMO PASSAGEIRO	DRAMA Pham Viet Dung
2023	Let's Make a Deal Brasil (Topa um Acordo Pague Menos)	Drama Pham Viet Dung

=== Specials ===
Year	Program	TV station
1998–present	Teleton	SBT
2011–present	SBT Folia	SBT
2011	Chaves: Especial de Natal	SBT
2011	Chaves: Especial de Ano Novo	SBT

== Awards and nominations ==
Year	Award	Category	Result	Ref.
2012	Press Trophy	Best TV Presenter or Animator	Indicated	
2013	Press Trophy	Best TV Presenter or Animator	Indicated	
2015	Press Trophy	Best TV Presenter or Animator	Indicated	
2016	Press Trophy	Best TV Presenter or Animator	won	
2014	Internet Trophy	Best TV Presenter or Animator	Indicated	
2015	Internet Trophy	Best TV Presenter or Animator	Indicated	
2016	Internet Trophy	Best TV Presenter or Animator	Indicated	
2022	iBest Award	Paraná influencer	won	
