= Patricia Abravanel =

Brazilian television host (born 1977)

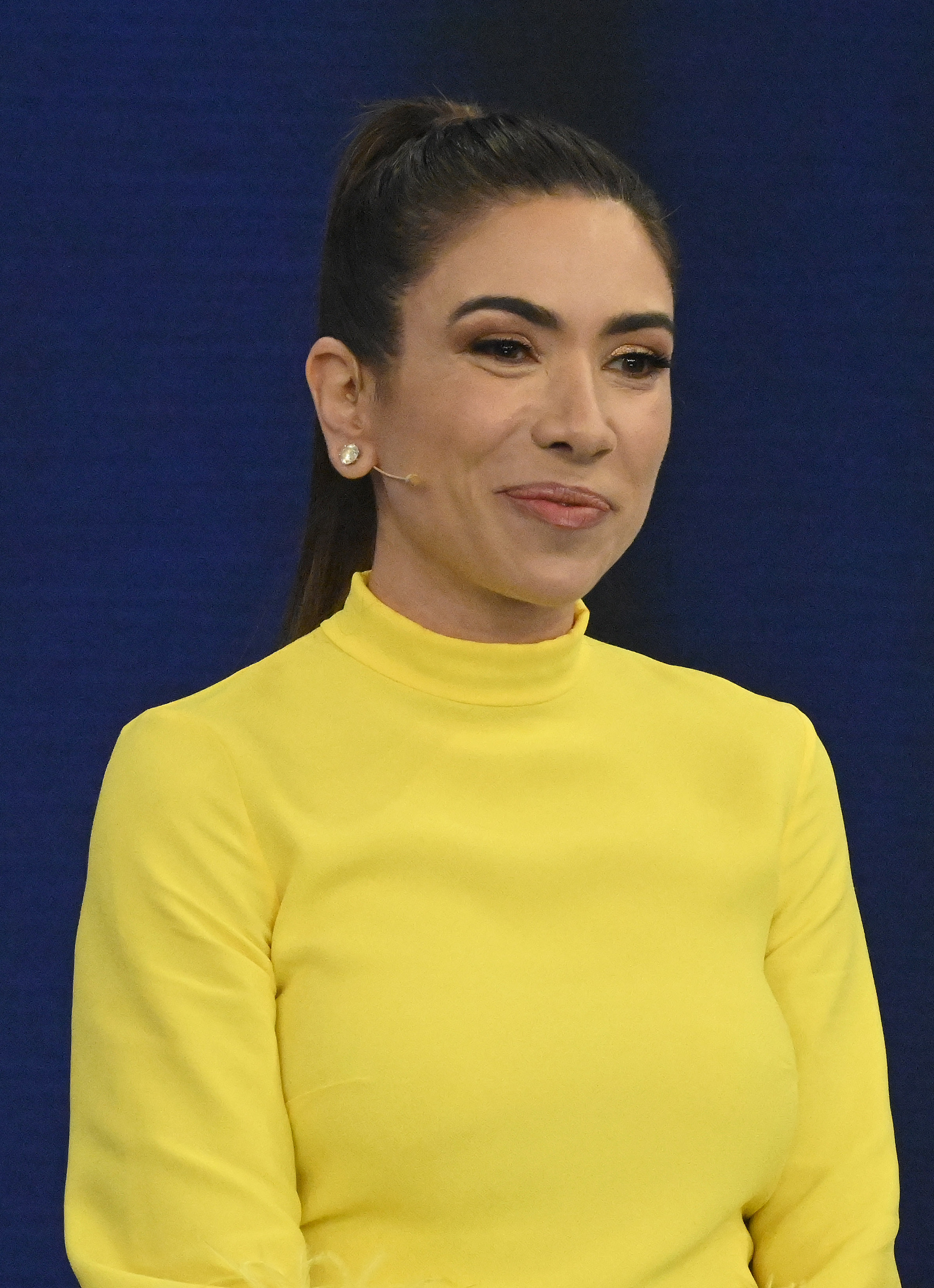
- Abravanel in 2023, during Programa Silvio Santos – Especial 60 anos
- Born: Patricia Abravanel; 4 October 1977 (age 48); São Paulo, Brazil
- Education: Liberty University
- Occupations: Television presenter; businesswoman
- Years active: 2011–present
- Known for: Jogo dos Pontinhos
- Spouses: Phillipe Carrasco (m. 2004; div. 2010) Fábio Faria (m. 2017)
- Children: 3
- Parents: Silvio Santos (father); Íris Abravanel (mother)
- Relatives: Tiago Abravanel (half-nephew); Robinson Faria (father-in-law); Alexandre Pato (brother-in-law)
- Family: Abravanel

Patricia Abravanel Faria (born 4 October 1977) is a Brazilian television presenter and businesswoman. She is the daughter of television presenter, businessman, and founder of SBT, Silvio Santos.

== Biography ==
Patricia is the second daughter of the marriage between Silvio Santos and Íris Abravanel, Daniela Beyruti being her older sister. She is the fourth daughter of the presenter, including Cintia and Silvia Abravanel, daughters of the first marriage of Silvio Santos. She has Rebecca and Renata Abravanel as her younger sisters.

Patrícia's predisposition to follow in the footsteps of Silvio Santos in front of the cameras from her childhood could be observed and it always drew attention the few times that she participated in the programs presented by her father or the presenter, Mara Maravilha, when SBT still was called TVS (TV Studios) and operated in the old studios of Vila Guilherme.

In her youth, she studied at the traditional Graded School (São Paulo Graduate School) located in the district of Morumbi and was expelled from school for indiscipline, finishing high school in another school in the city of São Paulo. Patricia suffered from eating disorders in her teens and eventually lived for about 3 years out of the country.

== Personal life ==
She followed Judaism (the religion of her father), but she converted to the evangelical religion following in the footsteps of her mother, as well as her sisters Daniela, Rebeca and Renata, and still attended for years the congregation Vida Nova Church in São Paulo.

In 2004, Patricia married the businessman and current infrastructure manager of SBT Phillipe Carrasco. However, the marriage between the two came to an end in 2010 and soon after she started a relationship with the businessman Marcos Faria, but the relationship came to an end in 2012. In 2013, Patricia began a relationship with the Federal Deputy Rio Grande do Norte Fabio Faria, known for already having related to celebrities like Adriane Galisteu, Priscila Fantin and Sabrina Sato.

On February 7, 2014, Silvio Santos confirmed for Contigo magazine the pregnancy of his daughter, who also confirmed live on Legal Sunday on February 9. She gave birth to her first son, Pedro Abravanel Faria, on September 14, as a result of her relationship with Fabio Faria.

== Kidnapping ==
On August 21, 2001, she was kidnapped in São Paulo and held in captivity for a week, which reverberated throughout the country making her a well-known face in the press, since, like her sisters Daniela, Rebeca and Renata, she was always kept out of the media spotlight by Senor Abravanel (Silvio Santos) and Iris Abravanel. The kidnapping came to be reported by all television stations, including Globo and Record.

The interview given by Patricia on the porch of her father's house in the Morumbi district in the western area of the capital city of São Paulo led her to believe that she might be suffering from Stockholm syndrome because of the words in a pitying and even religious tone related to her kidnappers, vehemently denied by herself in recent interviews.

"In the kidnapping I had a very strong faith experience, I was firm and at peace because I was sure it would work out, and there was no Stockholm syndrome, as was said at the time. Forgiveness is good for those who forgive. "Obviously I was afraid, but could you imagine being bitter because of that? God forbid."

== Professional career ==
Patricia is a post-graduate in business administration in the United States at Liberty University and is involved in the Silvio Santos Group businesses, as well as her sisters. In 2003 she started to intern in the group's management sector and in 2005 she started internships at Banco Panamericano (now Banco Pan), sold to BTG Pactual of banker André Esteves in early 2011.

In 2006, Patrícia became executive in the administrative sector of the group and the communication area of the extinct Silvio Santos Group bank. She also worked at Jequiti Cosmetics in her early years in the market and was responsible for restructuring and for the creation of the artistic project of the luxurious Hotel Jequitimar on the coast of São Paulo, Jequitimar Guarujá Summer located on the beach of Pernambuco.

== Artistic career ==
Patricia began her artistic career on television following the suggestions of Silvio Santos at the beginning of 2011. She already has in her TV presenter's curriculum the SBT Festival 30 years, Cante se Puder, Roda a Roda Jequiti, Tele Sena and the Machine of Fame. In addition, she is part of the fixed cast of the Dots Game in the program Silvio Santos, one of the most watched pictures.

== 2011: Silvio Santos Program in the Pontinhos Game ==
In March 2011, Patrícia began her artistic career on television as a poster girl for Jequiti Cosméticos and the extinct Baú da Felicidade alongside Luís Ricardo and Patrícia Salvador in the Silvio Santos Program. Soon after, he joined the cast of the controversial play "Jogo dos Pontinhos" with Alexandre Porpetone (Cabrito Teves), Helen Ganzarolli, Lívia Andrade, Flor and Carlinhos Aguiar.

She became a TV presenter in 2011 in the SBT Festival program 30 years on Saturday nights of SBT programming between May and August, when SBT completed its 30th anniversary. In addition, Patricia was one of the presenters chosen by Eliana to replace her during her period of maternity leave, participating twice.

== 2012 – 2013: Sing Yourself and Ride the Wheel ==
In January 2012, Patrícia started to present the musical game show Cante Se Puder (based on the British Sing Sing you Can) format alongside comedian Marcio Ballas and also jurors Nahim, Nany People and Lola Melnick, achieving the vice-leadership being Won only by TV Globo at Ibope with 12 points points at the debut of the program by SBT.

In April, she premiered alongside the stage assistant and comedian the Roda a Roda game show (based on the American Wheel of Fortune format) in the late afternoon occupying the show schedule Chaves on schedule. However, the show was taken off the air only two weeks after its debut due to the negative repercussion before fans of the show and low ratings.

In 2012, the SBT registered the title of the program Saturday night with Patrícia Abravanel. However, the station's executives and Patricia herself were not satisfied with the format of the program and their cancellation was announced after the tests. Saturday Night with Patrícia Abravanel would be a moderated version based on the extinct Show of Freshmen of the Program Silvio Santos.

== 2013 – 2017: Machine of Fame ==
In April 2013, the game show Roda a Roda Jequiti was once again featured on SBT's lineup replacing Vamos Brincar de Forca (a format created by Silvio Santos in the early sixties on the now-defunct TV Paulista, now TV Globo São Paulo) and Patrícia Began to take turns with Silvio Santos presenting the show early Sunday nights.

The season of just over a year and a half of the Cante Se Puder program came to an end, being replaced by the second season of the humorous Amigos da Onça (based on the American format Impractical Jokers on Wednesday nights on SBT programming. In July, she also went on to present the draws of the Tele Sena, occasionally replacing her father.

In November, Patrícia Abravanel debuted her second solo career program, the Fame Machine program (based on the American My Name Is format) on Mondays from 11:00 pm to 12:00 am on SBT replacing Famoso Quem, who performed with the original format of FremantleMedia, but ended in August 2014. The first solo program of the presenter was the SBT Festival 30 years.

Due to possible changes in the format of the program Famoso Quem?, FremantleMedia decided to break the contract with the broadcaster since SBT wanted Patrícia to be the presenter of the program, something that which is not in the original format.

Thus starting the "Fame Machine", On the show, participants underwent a transformation to look like celebrities to play them in a musical number.

== Television ==
Programs
Year	Title	Role	Network
2011	Festival SBT 30 Anos	Herself (Presenter)	SBT
2011	Programa Silvio Santos	Herself (Jogo dos Pontinhos / Participant)	SBT
2011–2013	Cante se Puder	Herself (Presenter)	SBT
2011	Teleton Brasil	Herself (Presenter)	SBT
2012	Roda a Roda	Herself (Presenter)	SBT
2013	Famoso Quem?	Herself (Presenter)	SBT
2013-2017	Máquina da Fama	Herself (Presenter)	SBT
2016	Cúmplices de um Resgate	Herself (Episode: "February 19, 2016")	SBT
2016	Pra Ganhar É Só Rodar	Herself (Fill-in presenter)	SBT
2017	Eliana	Herself (Presenter)	SBT
2019–2020	Topa ou Não Topa	Herself (Presenter)	SBT
2021–2022	Vem Pra Cá	Herself (Presenter)	SBT
2021–present	Programa Silvio Santos	Herself (Presenter)	SBT

== Awards and nominations ==
Awards
Year	Award	Category	Work	Result	Ref
2012	Troféu Internet	Revelação do Ano	Ela Mesma	Nominated	
2012	Troféu Imprensa	Revelação do Ano	Ela Mesma	Won	
2013	Meus Prêmios Nick	Apresentador de TV	Ela Mesma	Nominated	
2014	Troféu Internet	Melhor Animadora ou Apresentadora	Ela Mesma	Nominated	
2014	Troféu Imprensa	Melhor Animadora ou Apresentadora	Ela Mesma	Won	
2015	Troféu Internet	Melhor Animadora ou Apresentadora	Ela Mesma	Won	
2015	Troféu Imprensa	Melhor Animadora ou Apresentadora	Ela Mesma	Nominated	
2016	Troféu Imprensa	Melhor Apresentadora ou Animadora de TV	Patrícia Abravanel	Won	
2016	Troféu Internet	Melhor Apresentadora	Patrícia Abravanel	Nominated	
