= Silvio Santos =

Brazilian television presenter and business magnate (1930–2024)

Silvio Santos OMC
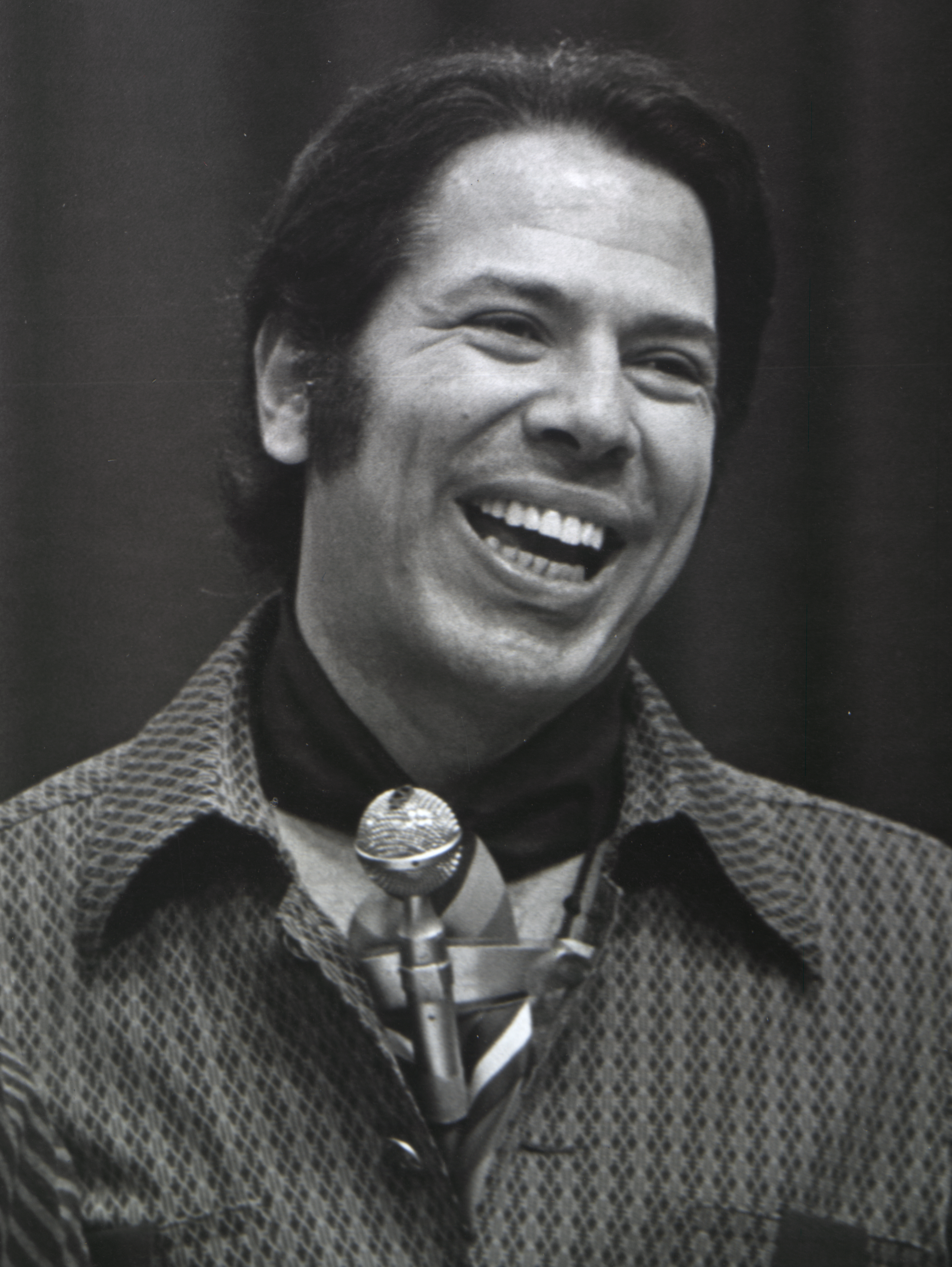
- Santos, c. 1970
- Born: Senor Abravanel; 12 December 1930; Rio de Janeiro, Federal District, Brazil
- Died: 17 August 2024 (aged 93); Albert Einstein Israelite Hospital, São Paulo, Brazil
- Occupations: Television host; media mogul
- Years active: 1965–2024
- Title: Chairman and founder of Grupo Silvio Santos
- Spouses: Maria Aparecida Vieira (m. 1962; died 1977) Íris Pássaro (m. 1979)
- Children: 6, including Patricia
- Father: Alberto Abravanel
- Relatives: Tiago Abravanel (grandson); Fábio Faria (son-in-law); Alexandre Pato (son-in-law)

Senor Abravanel (Hebrew: סניור אברבנאל, romanized: Senhor Abarbanel; pronounced [saniur avravne'el]; 12 December 1930 – 17 August 2024), known professionally as Silvio Santos, was a Brazilian television presenter and business magnate. Widely regarded as the greatest personality in Brazilian television, he was the founder of the television network Sistema Brasileiro de Televisão (SBT) and the conglomerate Grupo Silvio Santos, which holds interests in media and real estate among other assets. Throughout his life, he was also involved in other areas such as music and politics. His net worth was estimated at $1.3 billion in 2013, making him the only Brazilian celebrity on Forbes' billionaires list.

Born in Lapa, Rio de Janeiro, the former capital city of Brazil and former Federal District of Brazil, Abravanel was the eldest son of Alberto Abravanel and Rebeca Caro, Sephardic Jews who migrated to Brazil in 1924. Working as a hawker, salesman, and also on the radio, Abravanel debuted on television in the early 1960s as the host of the variety show Vamos Brincar de Forca on TV Paulista (now part of TV Globo), adopting the stage name "Silvio Santos". In 1963, he began hosting Programa Silvio Santos, which would become one of the longest-running programs on Brazilian television.

In 1976, amid creative conflicts with Globo executives, Santos entered the broadcasting industry himself by launching a new television station in Rio known as TVS, and purchasing a 50% stake in Rede Record, moving Programa Silvio Santos to the two outlets and Rede Tupi. When Tupi was closed by Brazil's military dictatorship, Santos' company acquired several of the former network's licenses, and joined with TVS to form a new national network known as SBT; the network would target lower middle class and working class viewers.

Santos had six daughters, fourteen grandchildren and four great-grandchildren. In his first marriage, to Maria Aparecida Vieira, most known as Cidinha, he had his first two daughters, Cintia (mother of actor Tiago Abravanel) and Silvia. The couple was together until 1977 when Cidinha died of cancer. Santos married for the second time to Íris Abravanel in 1981, with whom he remained until the end of his life and had four other daughters, Daniela, Patricia, Rebeca and Renata. Santos received several awards and honors, including almost thirty Imprensa trophies, sixteen Internet trophies and ten Roquette Pinto trophies, in addition to being honored with the Order of Merit for Communication by former president Dilma Rousseff and honored by carnival blocks.

== Early life ==
Abravanel was the son of Sephardic Jewish immigrants born in the Ottoman Empire. His father, Alberto Abravanel, was born in Thessaloniki, Greece in 1897 whilst his mother, Rebecca Caro, was born in Smyrna, Turkey in 1905. Both died in Rio de Janeiro (in 1975 and 1988 respectively) and are buried side by side in the Caju Jewish Cemetery, Rio de Janeiro. He was a descendant of Isaac Abrabanel, a 15th-century Portuguese Jewish statesman. Abravanel attended primary school at the Escola Municipal Celestino da Silva, and graduated from Colégio Estadual Amaro Cavalcanti.

Abravanel worked on the streets of Rio de Janeiro as a street vendor at the age of 14, selling plastic cases for storing voter registration cards. Impressed by his voice, he was invited to try out for a position at Radio Guanabara, but quit after a month because he made more money as a street vendor. At the age of 18, he began service in the Brazilian Army, training as part of the Paratroopers Brigade.

== Broadcasting career ==
As he had time off on Sundays, Abravanel revisited his pursuit of a broadcasting career by joining Rádio Mauá. He later moved to Rádio Tupi, and added another position at Rádio Continental in Niterói—to which he travelled by ferry from Rio. Seeing an opportunity in adding entertainment for passengers, he began a business venture of bringing a PA system aboard the ferry to play music and commercials. Abravanel quit Rádio Continental to focus on the ferry venture instead, which proved successful. After the ferry company added bars to the ships, Santos spearheaded raffle promotions where passengers could receive a ticket by buying a beverage.

Abravanel adopted the professional name Silvio Santos; his mother Caro had taken to calling him "Silvio" instead of "Senor" as it was easier to pronounce, while his surname stemmed from having once said "que todos os Santos me ajudem" ("may all the Saints help me") before going on the air.

=== Baú da Felicidade, television work ===
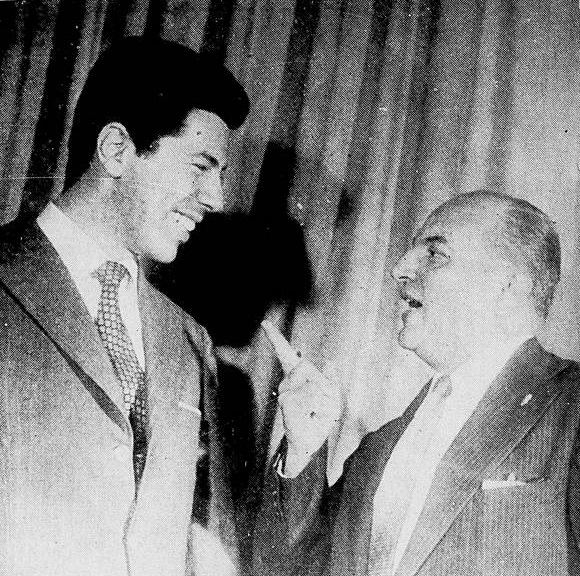
Santos with comedian Manuel Soares de Nóbrega in 1952

Santos would later move to São Paulo, taking a job at Rádio Nacional de São Paulo, and beginning other ventures such as a magazine, and a circus caravan—where he would continue a focus on raffles as an aspect of his businesses. One of the advertisers Santos would work with at the station was Manuel de Nóbrega, entertainer and co-owner of Baú da Felicidade—a company that offered Christmas toy chests that customers could pay for in installments throughout the year. However, after the company faced financial issues (including Manuel's German partner taking the money for himself, the company being unable to deliver on its orders, and its "headquarters" being a largely empty basement), Manuel transferred the business to Santos—who would go on to establish a partnership with the Estrela toy company, and expand the program by allowing customers to redeem for other items besides toys.

In 1960, TV Paulista signed Santos to host a television program—Vamos Brincar de Forca—which would incorporate variety entertainment and raffles, and be used to promote Baú da Felicidade. He would also go on to host other programs for TV Tupi. In 1963, he moved to a Sunday afternoon variety show on TV Paulista, Programa Silvio Santos. In 1966, TV Paulista became part of the new Rede Globo, which signed Santos to a five-year deal. In 1971, Santos began to present the Troféu Imprensa, an awards presentation for Brazilian television. He opened a studio, Estudios Silvio Santos Cinema e Televisao, at the former facilities of TV Excelsior in 1974.

=== TVS and SBT ===
In the early-1970s, Rede Globo began to shift its programming strategy in order to help improve viewership, with a stronger focus on telenovelas, news, sports, and films. As his variety programming conflicted with these new policies, Santos' relationship with Globo executives began to falter, and he almost left the network in 1972. Santos sought to establish his own channel, but his contract with Globo prevented him from holding ownership stakes in a competitor. In the interim, Santos had a partner—Dermerval Gonçalves—covertly offer to acquire a stake in TV Record on his behalf to keep his programming on the air in São Paulo.

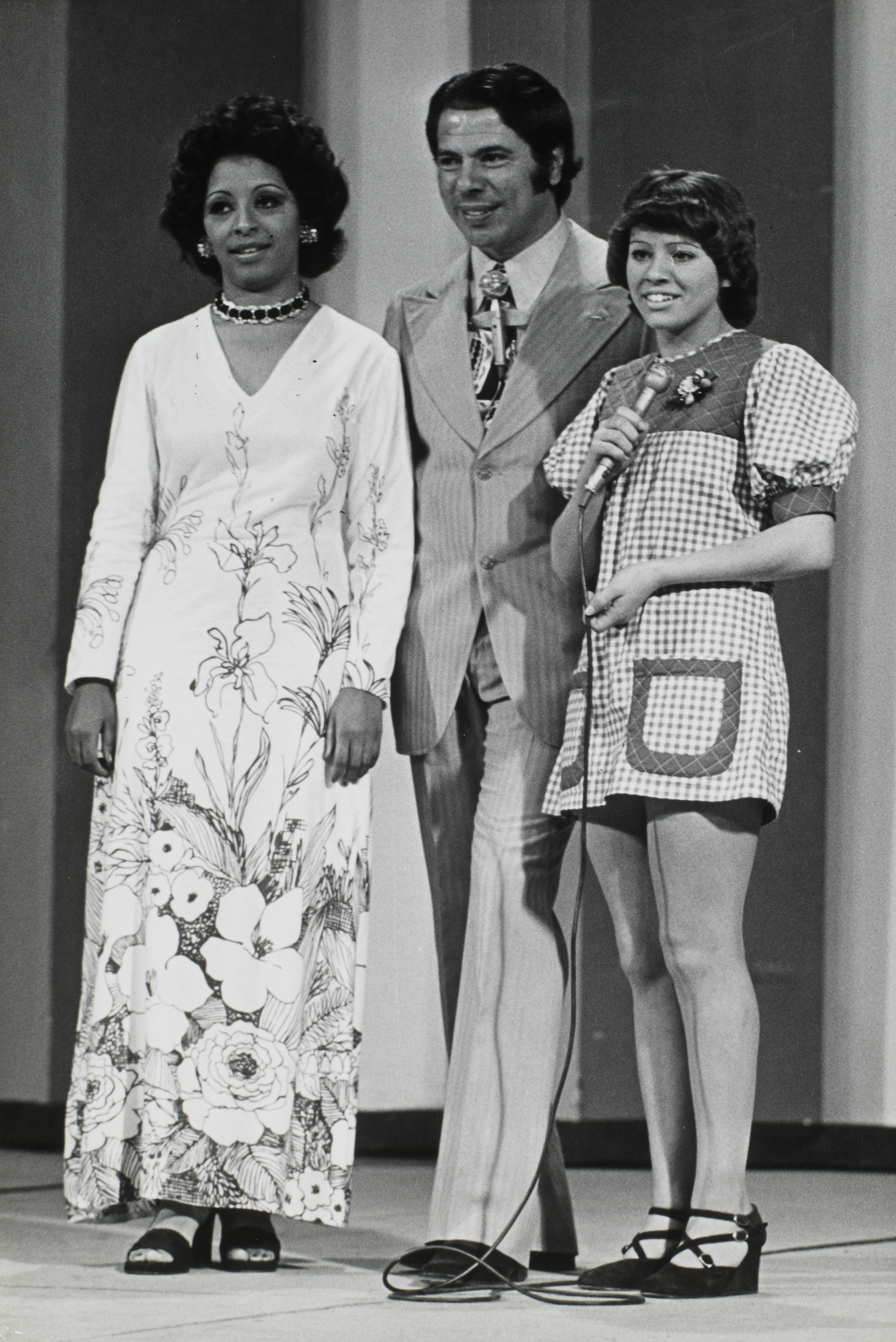
Silvio Santos in the TV program First Brazilian Championship of New Singers, 1972. National Archives of Brazil.

When the Brazilian government began taking applications for a new VHF station in Rio on channel 11, Santos would bid for its concession with the support of Manuel de Nóbrega and other television personalities (including Carlos Eduardo Imperial, who had previously been critical of Santos's programming). Santos would be awarded the concession for channel 11 in December 1975, becoming the first Brazilian television artist to own a broadcast station.

To get the station on air as quickly as possible, Santos purchased transmission equipment formerly used by TV Continental (which had closed in 1971) at auction; initially dismissed as junk by the press, it was discovered that all of the equipment was in working order, and capable of broadcasting in colour (with its use by Continental pre-dating the official introduction of PAL-M colour television in 1972). The new station—known as TVS—first broadcast on 14 May 1976. Programa Silvio Santos would subsequently move from Globo to TVS in August; it would also be simulcast by TV Record (with Santos having completed his purchase of a 50% stake), and Rede Tupi.

In July 1980, Rede Tupi was closed by the military dictatorship, and the federal government began to take bids on its stations' concessions. Santos was among several parties placing bids, and commissioned a survey from the IBOPE that displayed public support for him as an owner. In 1981, the stations would be awarded to Grupo Silvio Santos and Grupo Bloch, with Santos awarded Tupi's former signals in São Paulo and Porto Alegre. His victory in São Paulo was criticized by a local broadcasters' union, who lamented TVS's programming as "canned goods", and felt that Santos only wanted to sell more Baú da Felicidade cards.

The São Paulo station signed on 19 August 1981, and the Porto Alegre station soon afterward; the two stations and TVS would form a new network known as the Sistema Brasileiro de Televisão (SBT). The new network's programming would aim to target a lower middle class and working class audience. Meanwhile, Bloch's stations became the core of another new network, Rede Manchete. Santos had also won the concession for a station in Rio; this station would be transferred to Paulinho Machado de Carvalho, and operate as an affiliate of TV Record. By the late-1980s, SBT became more established, acquiring popular film rights, and signing names such as Hebe Camargo, Carlos Alberto de Nóbrega, and Jô Soares.

In January 1988, Santos traveled to Boston to undergo medical treatment for vocal cord issues that had caused him to lose his voice, and a tumor on one of his eyelids, which was found to be benign. As his spouse Maria Aparecida Vieira had died from cancer in 1977, the 57 year-old Santos had introspections between himself and his colleagues regarding his health and future, leading him to begin the process of naming a successor. During the Rio Carnival the following month, Santos personally intervened with Globo's president Roberto Marinho to keep Gugu Liberato—an SBT personality who had been offered a Sunday variety show on Globo—from defecting to the competitor. Santos would give Gugu a larger salary, and prominent hosting roles in SBT's Sunday lineup (which would later include his own variety show, Domingo Legal).

=== Further projects ===
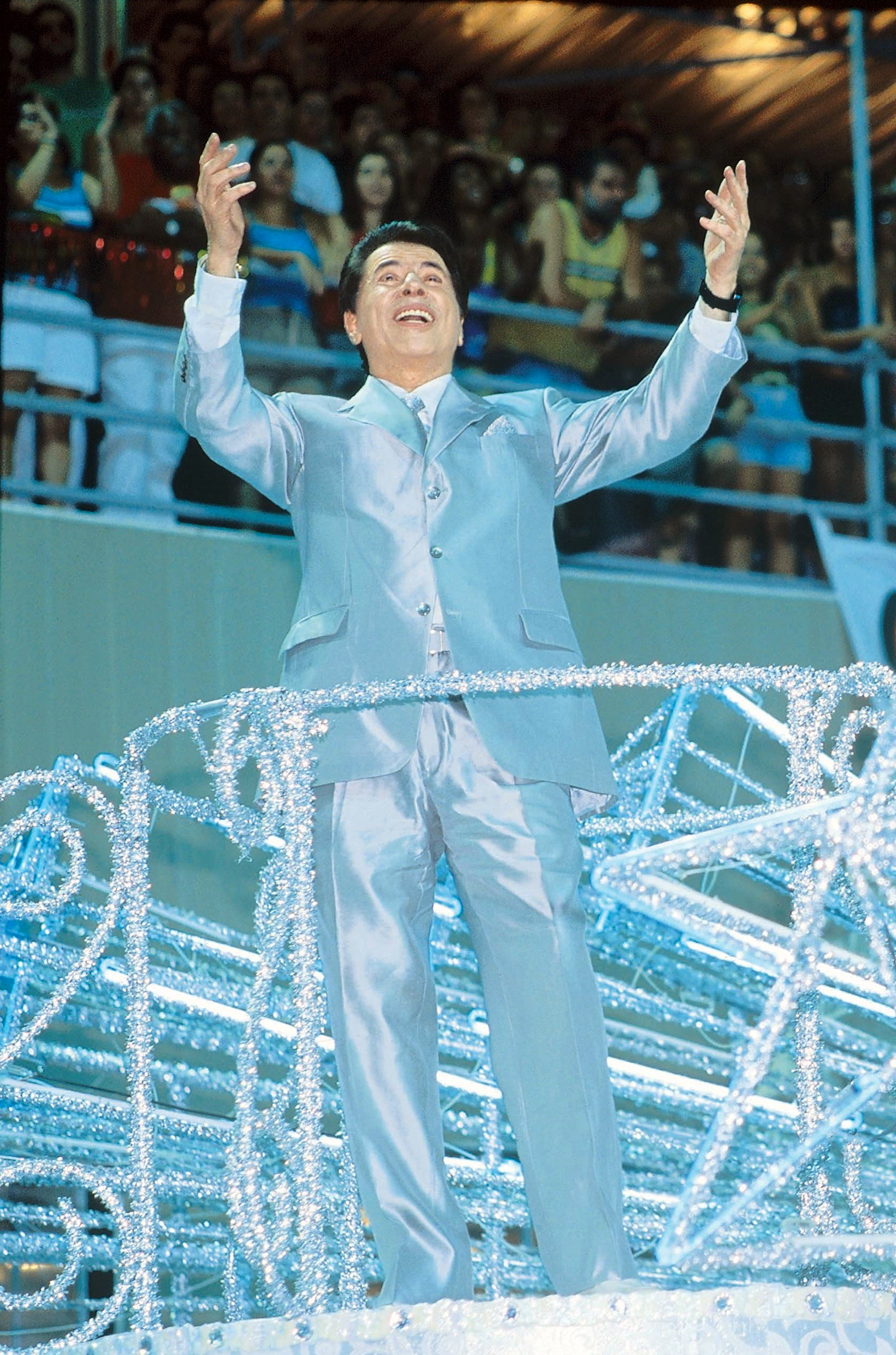
Santos with the Tradição samba school during the 2001 Rio Carnival.

In 1989, 20 days before the Brazil's first direct presidential election since 1960, Santos announced that he would run as a candidate for the Brazilian Municipalist Party. However, the party was delisted from the ballot shortly afterward due to multiple technicalities. Amid financial issues at the broadcaster, agreements were reached to sell Rede Record to Edir Macedo, founder of the Universal Church of the Kingdom of God.

In 1991, Santos would premiere one of his most popular series, the hidden camera game show Topa Tudo por Dinheiro. Adapted from the American series Anything for Money, the show would introduce a trademark of Santos throwing paper planes made from banknotes into the studio audience as prizes (a practice that, at one point, drew the ire of the Central Bank of Brazil), and the accompanying catchphrase "Quem quer dinheiro?" ("Who wants money?").

In 1999, Santos premiered Show do Milhão, a game show that was influenced by Who Wants to Be a Millionaire? (which would not have a local version until 2017, hosted by Luciano Huck for Globo) and became a major success for SBT through the early-2000s.

On 28 August 2001, Santos was held hostage in his mansion by Fernando Dutra Pinto, a suspect in the then-recent kidnapping of his daughter Patricia Abravanel. After holding the presenter captive for eight hours, Fernando was later detained by police, and Santos was released, joined by Governor of São Paulo Geraldo Alckmin.

In October 2001, Santos entered the reality television market by premiering Casa dos Artistas. The show was inspired by the Dutch format Big Brother; Santos had attempted to acquire the local rights to the format for SBT, but lost to Globo. The series was developed in secret, and only revealed on its premiere date of 28 October 2001, drawing away viewers from Globo's highly viewed newsmagazine Fantástico. Its similarities to Big Brother led to Globo (who held local rights to the franchise, but had not yet made any plans to produce a Brazilian version) briefly reaching an injunction to halt its broadcast, but Casa would later return to air. The first season was successful, with SBT averaging 46 ratings points, and the success prompting Globo to launch a local adaptation of Big Brother to capitalize upon it.

By the 2000s, Programa Silvio Santos was primarily structured as a block of multiple Sunday-afternoon programs rather than as a singular variety show, with Santos focusing more on hosting individual programs, particularly on Wednesday nights. In 2008, Programa Silvio Santos was revived as a variety show, with Santos reviving classic segments and features.

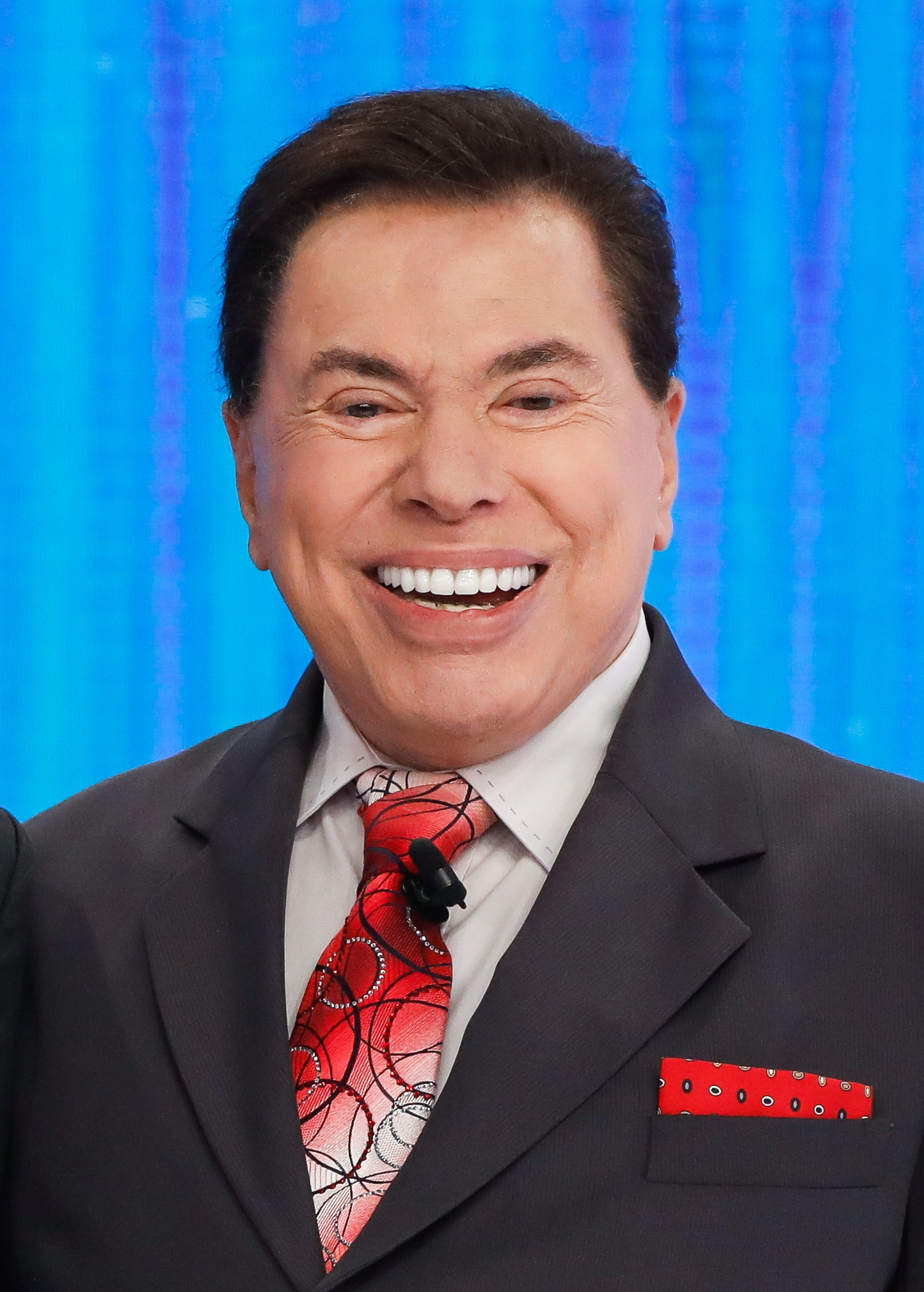
Santos in 2019

With a net worth of US$3.2 billion, Santos was the single biggest individual/natural person taxpayer in Brazil.

=== Departure from television work ===
In 2020, Programa Silvio Santos went on hiatus due to the COVID-19 pandemic, with its timeslot filled by compilations of highlights from past episodes of the series and other Silvio Santos programs. In December 2020, the presenter celebrated his 90th birthday privately with his family. In July 2021, Programa Silvio Santos briefly returned to filming for the first time since 2020, but was halted again after Santos was infected with COVID-19.

In October 2021, Santos's daughter Patricia Abravanel began to serve as a guest host, filling in for Santos. In April 2022, Santos returned to the program for the first time in eight months, marked by an appearance as a surprise opponent for Ratinho in the show's "Jogo das Três Pistas" game. However, his return would be brief, as Santos began to steadily reduce his involvement in television work. Santos would step down as host of his eponymous program, with his final episode taped in September 2022 and airing on 26 February 2023; at this time, Patricia took over as the permanent host of Programa Silvio Santos, but Santos would continue to make occasional appearances on the program and other SBT specials.

Santos would also step down from his role as vice president of SBT in April 2023, in favor of his daughter Daniela Beyruti. Despite these moves, Santos did not officially announce his retirement.

== Public image ==
=== Accusations of racism and misogyny ===
In November 2014, during the participation of the cast of the children's soap opera Chiquititas in Teleton Brasil, Silvio Santos commented on the hair of the Black actress Julia Olliver. When she said that she wanted to be "an actress or singer" when she grew up, she heard from the presenter: "But with that hair?". In September 2016, during the Programa Silvio Santos, the presenter commented that the curly hair of a Black girl in the audience "was very eye-catching". In November of the same year, during Teleton, when interviewing a Black dancer, Silvio Santos said: "You are very graceful. Although being the only black woman among the white women, you are beautiful."

In early July 2017, Silvio criticized presenter Fernanda Lima's appearance, saying: "skinny, very skinny," that she "has no love or sex," and that "only dogs like bones." When questioned about the matter on the show Pânico na Band, Fernanda responded: "Silvio, why don't you shut up?"

In December 2018, while participating in Teleton Brasil, Claudia Leitte heard criticism from Silvio Santos about her outfit. Later, the singer tried to hug him and heard from the presenter: "This hugging thing excites me." Claudia, trying to minimize the embarrassment, replied: "You meant excited as in euphoria, as in enthusiasm, right?". However, Silvio insisted: "No, excited as in excited." The next day, Claudia said: "When we go through episodes like this, we see exemplified what happens to many women every day, in many places." After the incident, Silvio Santos opened Lívia Andrade's dress to peek at her cleavage and threatened to fire dancers with thin thighs. Referring to a publication in Istoé magazine that labeled him a misogynist, the presenter responded: "I don't know what misogynist means, but I thought it was nice. I am a misogynist! I am a misogynist!"

== Legacy ==
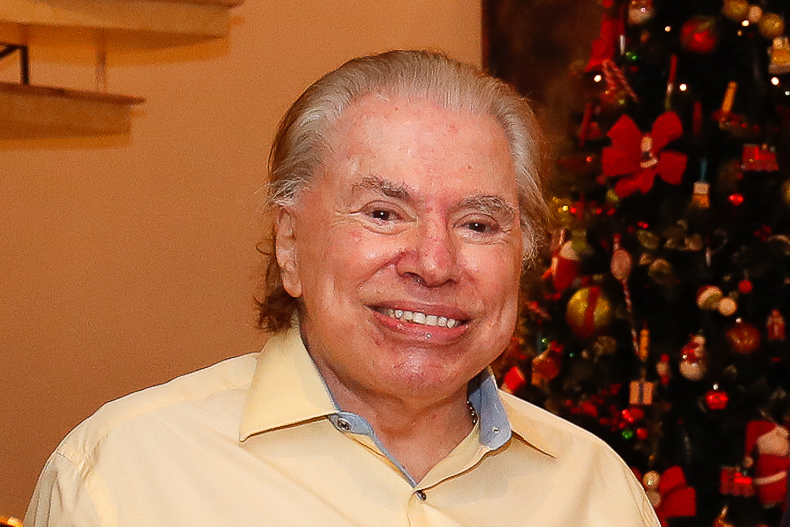
Santos in December 2020

Due to his extremely charismatic personality, Santos was one of the most influential and beloved people in Brazil, and was considered to be a "timeless" figure of Brazilian entertainment and nicknamed by many as "The King of Brazilian Television". In an obituary after his death, Argentine newspaper Clarín praised Santos's skills and self-confidence on-air.

Santos's other trademark was wearing a full-size microphone—a Sennheiser MD405 with a metal brace—on his chest (although he would eventually abandon this practice in late 2014).

== In popular culture ==
Daniel Boaventura portrayed Silvio Santos in the 2019 Brazilian film Hebe: A Estrela do Brasil, a biopic about Hebe Camargo.

Silvio Santos was portrayed by José Rubens Chachá in the 2022 biographical television series O Rei da TV. He was also portrayed by Rodrigo Faro in the 2024 biographical film Silvio.

Leandro Hassum portrays Silvio Santos in the 2025 biographical film Silvio Santos Vem Aí.

== Death ==
In September 2022, Santos took time off in television by as host of Programa Silvio Santos (being succeeded by his daughter Patricia Abravanel), and stepping down as vice president of SBT in 2023. In July 2024, he was hospitalized with H1N1 and was discharged two days later.

After being hospitalized again with the same disease, he died due to a bronchopneumonia, a complication provoked by H1N1, in São Paulo, on 17 August 2024, at age 93. He had been hospitalized at Albert Einstein Israelite Hospital since the beginning of August 2024.

His body was not veiled and was buried in Israelite Cemetery of Butantã. He did not want tributes or large wakes, which was respected by the family. Because he was Jewish, he was buried, since he could not be cremated.

== See also ==
- List of Brazilians by net worth
