= Family Food Fight =

Family Food Fight may refer to:

- Family Food Fight (Australian TV series), an Australian reality television series
  - Family Food Fight (American TV series), an American adaptation
  - Familias frente al fuego, a Mexican adaptation
