= Sistema Brasileiro de Televisão =

Brazilian commercial television network

Sistema Brasileiro de Televisão (SBT)
- Logo used since 2014

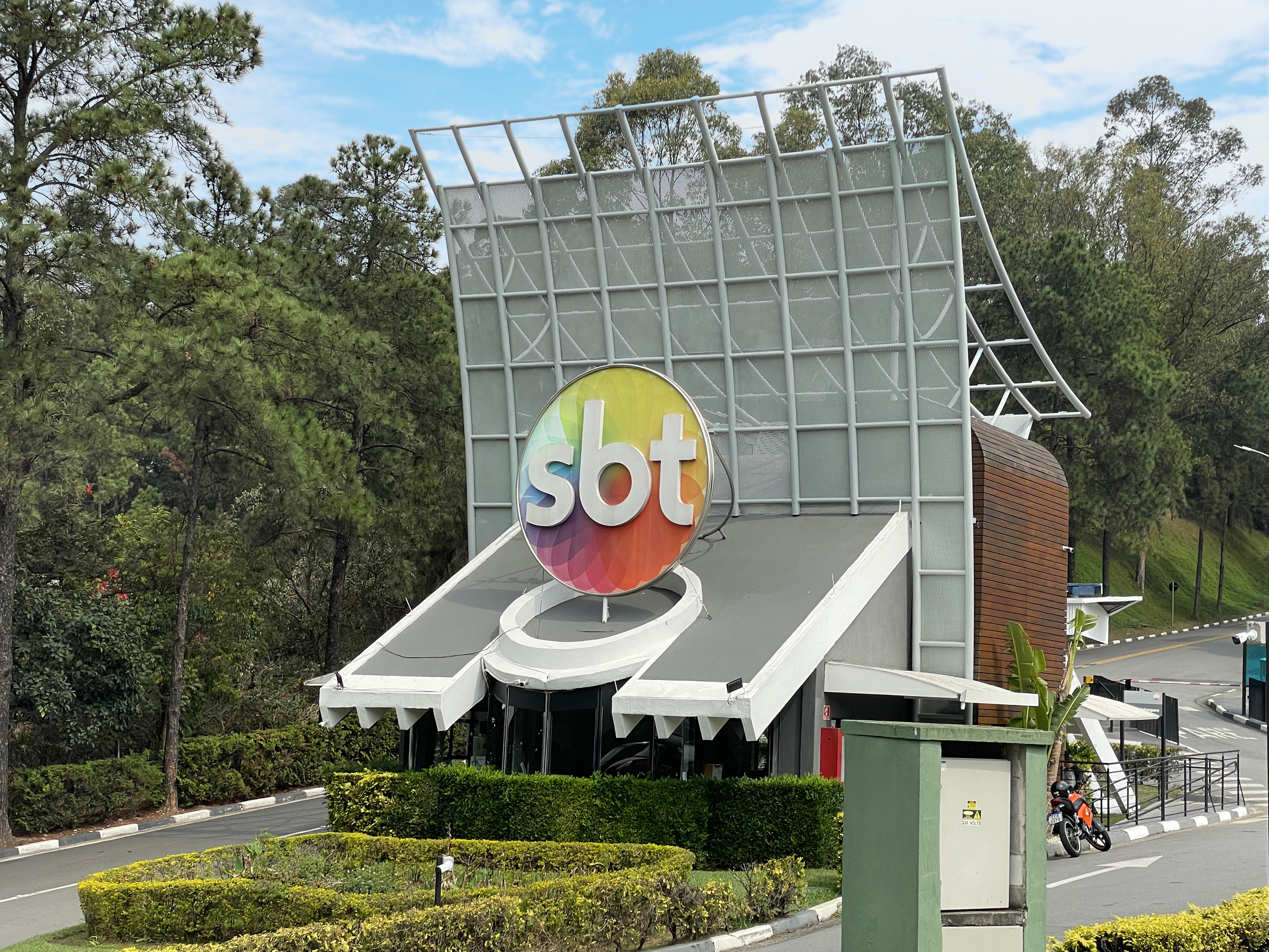
- Headquarters at CDT da Anhanguera
- Type: Free-to-air television network
- Country: Brazil
- Stations: SBT Brasília; SBT Interior RJ; SBT Rio; SBT RS; SBT São Paulo
- Affiliates: See List of SBT affiliates
- Headquarters: CDT da Anhanguera, Osasco, São Paulo, Brazil

Programming
- Language: Portuguese
- Picture format: 1080i HDTV (downgraded to 480i for the SD feed)

Ownership
- Owner: Grupo Silvio Santos
- Key people: Renata Abravanel, Rinaldi Faria
- Sister channels: SBT Internacional; SBT News; SBT Kids +SBT Novelas

History
- Founded: 19 August 1981; 45 years ago
- Founder: Silvio Santos
- Replaced: Rede Tupi (São Paulo, Porto Alegre and Belém)

Links
- Website: www.sbt.com.br

Availability

Terrestrial
- Digital terrestrial television: 24 UHF (Brasília, Nova Friburgo and Rio de Janeiro); 28 UHF (Porto Alegre and São Paulo)

Black logo (similar to the American Broadcasting Company logo), used as on-screen logo from 1995 to 1996, also in use as a corporate logo.

The Sistema Brasileiro de Televisão (Brazilian Portuguese: [sisˈtẽmɐ bɾaziˈlejɾu dʒi televiˈzɐ̃w̃], lit. Brazilian Television System; SBT, Brazilian Portuguese: [ˈɛsi ˈbe ˈte]) is a Brazilian free-to-air television network founded on 19 August 1981, by the businessman and television personality Silvio Santos. The company was established after a public tender by the Brazilian Federal Government to form two new networks (the other was Manchete), created from revoked concessions of the defunct Tupi and Excelsior networks. The network was founded on the same day that the concession agreement was signed, and that the act was broadcast live by the network, becoming its first program to be aired. Before acquiring the concessions of the four stations that were to form the SBT, Grupo Silvio Santos had since 1976 the concession of Rio de Janeiro's channel 11, known as TVS Rio de Janeiro (now SBT Rio), which was a fundamental step to give life to the SBT.

In April 2018, the SBT was the second-most watched television network in Brazil, behind Globo. Throughout its existence, the network always occupied the space in the audience ranking, except between 2007 and 2014, when the Record network took its place. The SBT has a total of 114 broadcast television stations (O&Os and affiliates) throughout the Brazilian territory, and is also available through pay television operators (cable and satellite), free-to-air signal on satellite receivers and also through streaming media in their mobile application (Android, iOS and Windows), applications for smart TVs and its website. Also on their website, its programming is available in video on demand for free, also available from the video-sharing site YouTube since 2010. In March 2017, the 43 channels of the SBT on YouTube accumulated 20 million subscribers and 70 billion minutes watched.

SBT broadcasts a wide variety of television genres in its programming, whereas its own material generally stands adjacent to entertainment. Foreign programming, mainly the telenovelas produced by the networks owned by the Mexican conglomerate Televisa, are part of their program schedule. It is the only commercial television broadcaster in Brazil which airs children's programming, even arranging a partnership with The Walt Disney Company, in which the company provides two hours of daily programming for the network. The network also has airtime for the television news, producing all three daily newscasts on weekdays, a weekly news program and a weekly newscast.

The network owns CDT da Anhanguera, a television complex located at the kilometer 18 of the Rodovia Anhanguera, in Osasco, São Paulo, occupying an area of 231 thousand square meters. This is the third largest television complex in size installed in Latin America, being smaller only than the studios of TV Azteca, in Mexico, and the Estúdios Globo.

== History ==
=== Before SBT ===
Rede Tupi, the channel 4 in São Paulo, began operations in 1950. In 1962 (when he began his first TV program), Silvio Santos produced his own programs on Tupi, TV Paulista and on Rede Globo beginning in 1965. Soon enough, he started plans to have his own television channel. His production company, Estudios Silvio Santos Cinema e Televisão, was successful on Tupi, Globo and (since 1972) on Record (where he then owned half of the company's stock).

In 1976, with help from humorist and friend Manuel de Nóbrega (who had a show on Rede Globo and was part of Baú da Felicidade), Santos obtained a license for his own station: Rio de Janeiro's channel 11, known as "TV Studios" or "TVS". Soon after its launch, its flagship program (Programa Silvio Santos on Sundays) plus the late night Silvio Santos Diferente on weekdays began to be broadcast (Santos left Globo the same year). Other programs soon began, as the network gained support from city residents who sought an alternative to Globo, Tupi, Bandeirantes and TV Rio (the city's network, related to TV Record along with TVS). The new channel debuted on 14 May 1976, with a logo of a gold circle with the number 11 slanted in gold, which featured in the first Scanimate idents and promos for the channel - making it a pioneer station in the country when it came to computer animation. While during its early years the network studios were based in Rio, all program production for TVS transferred to São Paulo in 1978–79.

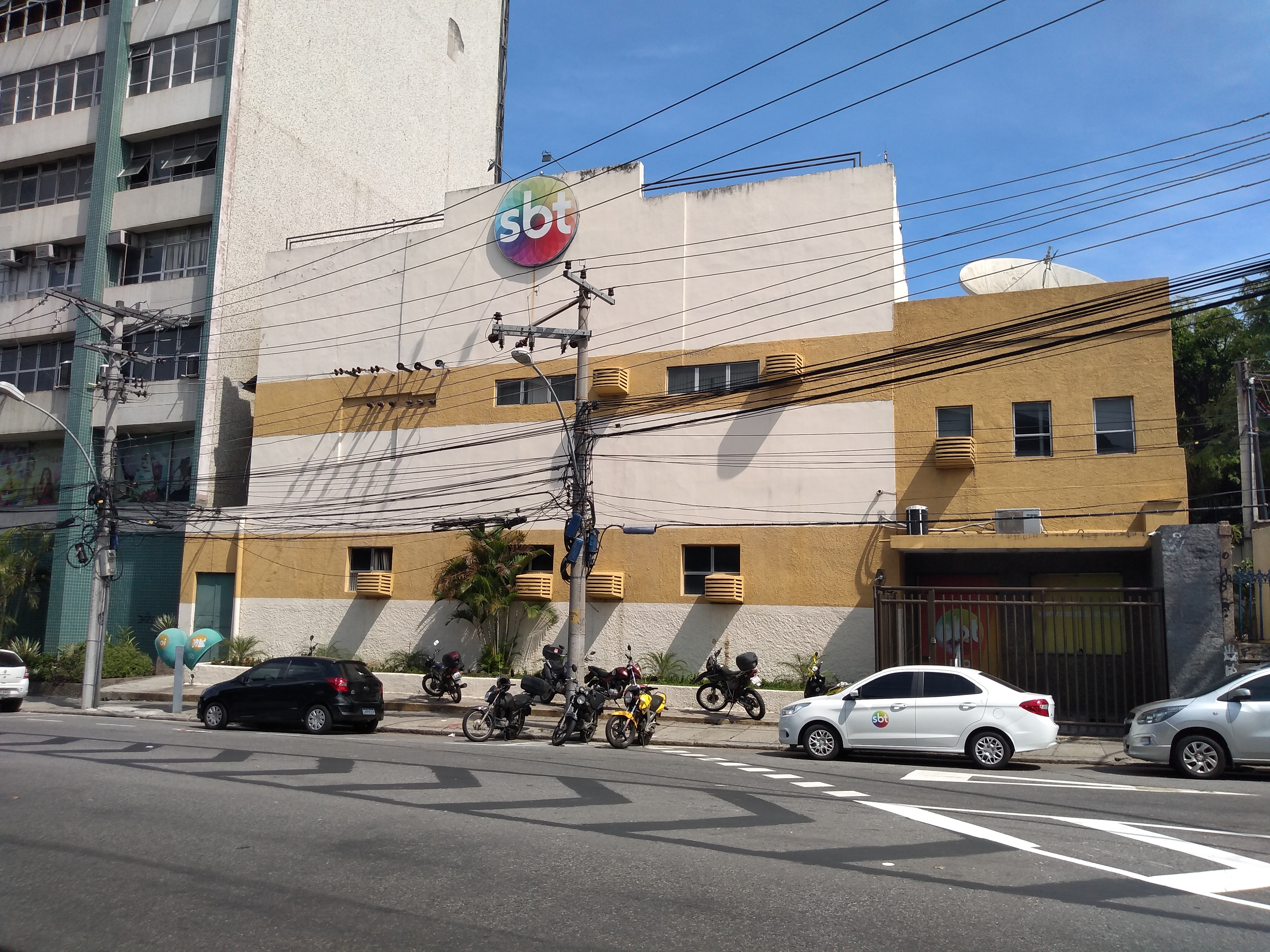
Former headquarters of TVS and SBT in Rio de Janeiro (1976–2020)

When Rede Tupi went out of business in 1980, Santos obtained three stations from the network: São Paulo's channel 4, Porto Alegre's channel 5 and Belém's channel 2 (eventually moving to channel 5 weeks after launch) in March 1981. Thus, SBT was created, launching on 19 August 1981. When launched, its owned and operated stations were branded as TVS, a branding already in use in Rio de Janeiro until its phaseout across all owned and operated stations in 1990.

Aside from its owned-and-operated stations, Minas Gerais' TV Alterosa on the same launch day became one of SBT's first affiliates for the network. Some later affiliates were adopted from Rede Tupi after its closure on 18 July 1980, by order of Brazilian Minister of Communications Haroldo de Matos, who the following year would order SBT to begin transmissions. When Tupi closed, Programa Silvio Santos moved to Record but continued simulcasting Sundays on TVS channel 11 as well as on yet another SS Group station - Channel 9, purchased from TV Continental. Santos began the network's expansion efforts, convincing stations to become the SBT and Record affiliates. The official launch of the network on 19 August 1981, also marked the debut of its first presentation package using its famous circle logo (similar to the one used till today by the American Broadcasting Company) and dual branding (the SBT being the official name of the network while TVS being the station branding in its three founding stations), and it was the only network launch to be held in Brasília and broadcast directly from the federal capital city. The first idents were similar to ABC's Still the One idents of 1979, used by the Nine Network in Australia in 1980.

The Matos decision also gave the network the Sumare studios of Tupi for drama production. By the time of the 1981 launch the SBT had 18 affiliate channels nationwide.

=== 1980s ===
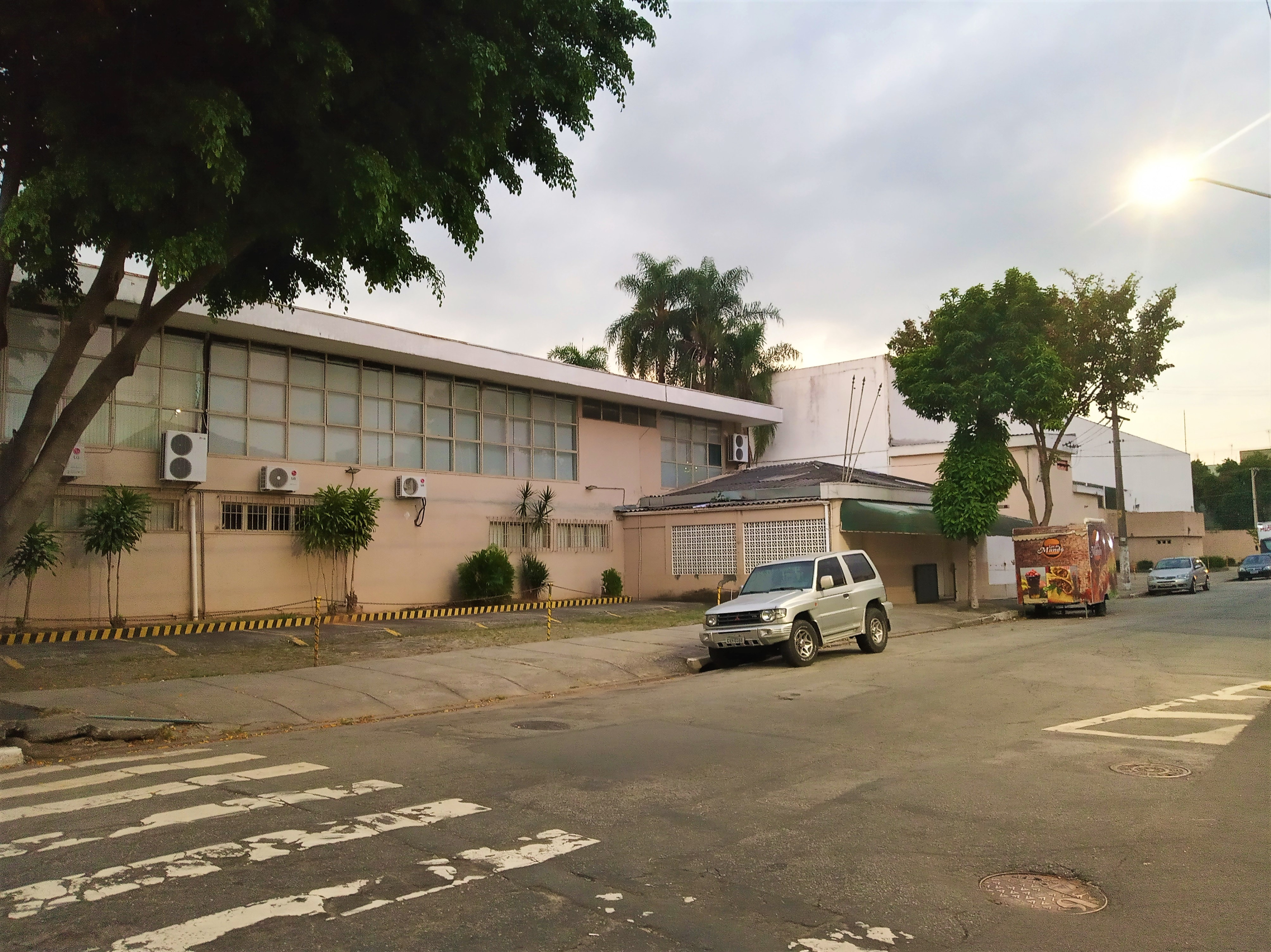
Former headquarters of the SBT in São Paulo

During the 1980s, the SBT established itself, contracting popular hosts and airing a mix of its own and Televisa programming (especially Mexican telenovelas and comedy shows such as El Chavo del Ocho and El Chapulín Colorado). It climbed to second place in the Brazilian ratings (except in Rio de Janeiro, where Rede Manchete occupied that position). Moreover, it hosted the Brazilian version of Bozo for kids plus even let ex-Tupi program presenters bring their shows over to the fledgling network.

SBT, together with Record (under the SBT/Record pool) broadcast the 1984 Summer Olympics in Los Angeles, two years later, it did the same endeavor for the 1986 FIFA World Cup coverage.

1985 would see the SBT score a historic victory with the broadcast of the American miniseries The Thorn Birds, and TVS Channel 4 São Paulo became SBT Channel 4 São Paulo, thus becoming a truly national network with the introduction of satellite broadcasts.

In March 1986, the network premiered its new talk show, Hebe, with Hebe Camargo as host; the show was formerly on Rede Tupi and Rede Bandeirantes. It became one of the network's longest-running programs, running for over 24 years; the final show was at the end of 2010, when Camargo ended her contract. She had a spin-off show, Hebe por Elas (Hebe for All), during the early 1990s. The death of Flavio Cavacante, one of the network's pioneer presenters, just days after his 22 May episode of his own program shocked the nation so much that on the day of his funeral the network started transmissions only in the afternoon in his honor.

In 1987, Santos pursued a better-quality program lineup, while trying to attract a larger audience and better advertisers. During that year (in response to the high popularity of Rede Globo's Xou da Xuxa on weekdays), SBT began increasing its child-oriented programming with programs such as Oradukapeta, Show Maravilha and the Do Re Mi series. Nearly all SBT kids' programs had female presenters (different from the format of Xou da Xuxa), because Oradukapeta was hosted by Sergio Mallandro (also a Show de Calorous judge).

==== Ad campaigns ====
American imports

The late 1980s was when SBT began to create American-style ad campaigns:

- 1987–88 – first year of "Quem Procura Acha Aqui": It used the music from NBC's "Be There" (1983–84).
- 1988–89 – second year of "Quem Procura Acha Aqui": It used the music from NBC's first installment of "Let's All Be There" (1984–85), with some visual elements similar to NBC's second installment of "Come Home to NBC" (1987–88).
- 1989–90 – third year of "Quem Procura Acha Aqui": It used the music from NBC's second installment of "Let's All Be There" (1985–86).

After acquiring the miniseries The Thorn Birds, SBT would schedule it after Globo's highly-rated soap opera Roque Santeiro, with Santos promoting that viewers could watch the soap and the "sensational" miniseries immediately afterward. SBT went as far as to pre-empt The Thorn Birds with cartoons after Globo—which had long been known for the punctuality of its schedule—responded by making Santeiro intentionally overrun its timeslot (thus keeping Santos' word that The Thorn Birds would air after Santeiro). SBT would also delaying an airing of the Rambo film First Blood with 50 minutes of dead air, after Globo scheduled a double-chapter of Vale Tudo against it. SBT had already pre-empted its showing of the film by a week after Globo scheduled an airing of Rambo: First Blood Part II the same day to compete. 1987 also was the year that the network began to change its corporate branding from TVS to the SBT.

Comedian Jô Soares was brought in from TV Globo in 1988, introducing a late-night talk program to Brazilian TV with his 11:30 PM show entitled Jô Soares Onze e Meia. Also signed was Boris Casoy, who became the first news anchor in Brazil with his TJ Brasil newscast (which succeeded Noticentro, the network's first newscast with Antonio Casale) and ex-Balão Mágico member Simony.

In 1988, Santos prevented host "Gugu" Liberato from signing with Globo after Liberato hosted the SBT's big weekend hit Viva a Noite since 1986. This was widely seen as indicative that Gugu would be Santos' successor on Sunday afternoons, reinforced by the extended timeslot of Gugu's future program Domingo Legal. As a result, Programa Sílvio Santos adopted the dual-presenter format, with Gugu hosting segments such as the Brazilian version of Double Dare, called Passa ou Repassa (known for its "Torta na Cara" segment) and Cidade contra Cidade.

=== 1990s ===
The TVS brand was merged into the SBT brand in 1990; the name change was seen in a new campaign ad modeled on NBC's "Come Home to NBC" campaign of 1986–87, which premiered early that year, and in August on TV station identifications celebrating SBT's ninth year of broadcasts (that year, Silvio Santos sold Record as a national network) and it also broadcast the 1990 FIFA World Cup. 1991 saw the beginning of its newscast Aqui Agora and Serginho Groisman's Programa Livre variety show, just a few of the many successes for the year even as the network's São Paulo studios suffered damages due to massive floods that hit the city. In 1992, the SBT and Rede Globo (together with Manchete, Band, and SporTV) jointly broadcast the 1992 Summer Olympics and the 1996 Summer Olympics (together with Manchete, Record, Band, SporTV, and ESPN) nationwide, with a grand advertising campaign for the Brazil national team. Despite problems and even the transfer of talents to other stations (such as the then resurgent Rede Record), the 90s proved to be a boom for the network, beginning its second decade with 74 affiliates, bigger when it signed on.

SBT invested in its own telenovelas and remakes of successful ones from foreign networks (most notably Chiquititas), variety programs, news and current affairs, and broadcast rights for sporting events (including the Copa Mercosur, Copa do Brasil and CART). It signed host Carlos "Ratinho" Massa in 1998, obtained more Mexican productions and launched game shows (such as Show do Milhão) in 1999. By the end of the decade the SBT held second place in the Brazilian ratings, after Globo, strengthened by a brand new and technologically advanced television complex, the CDT da Anhanguera, inaugurated in 1996, just in time for its 15th anniversary.

==== Ad campaigns ====
American and Australian imports

The 1990s were the SBT's most fruitful decade for American-style ad campaigns:

- 1990–91 – first year of "Vem Que é Bom": It used the music from NBC's second installment of "Come Home to NBC" (1987–88), with visual graphics similar to NBC's first installment of "Come Home to NBC" (1986–87), NBC's first installment of "Come Home to the Best, Only on NBC" (1988–89) and CBS' "CBS Spirit, Oh Yes" (1987–88).
- 1991–92 – second year of "Vem Que é Bom" with "10 anos com você" (the 10th-anniversary slogan): It used the music from NBC's first installment of "Come Home to NBC" (1986–87), with visual graphics similar to the ABC's Sunday/Monday/Thursday Night Movie intros from the network's first installment of "Something's Happening" (1987–88).
- 1993–94 – "Se liga no SBT": It used the exactly same music and graphics from CBS' second installment of "Get Ready for CBS" (1990–91).
- 1995–96 – "Fique ligado no SBT": It used the music from ABC's first installment of "America's Watching ABC" (1990–91).

Domestic campaigns

- In 1992, the one-minute spot "Aqui Tem" was launched for network-wide use. The promo featured an in-house soundtrack (with similarities to NBC's "Come Home to the Best, Only on NBC" campaign of 1988–89) and graphic elements from NBC's 1991 campaign, "The Place to Be".
- In August 1996 the SBT launched a new logo (replacing its multicoloured stripes with solid colours) and relaunched "QPAA" with a new slogan, "Tudo Pra Você", for its 15th anniversary.
- In 1997, the SBT made its new graphics based on ABC's 1993 campaign, "Watched by More People Than Any Other Network".
- In 1998, the network released "A cara do Brasil", with graphic elements from NBC's 1987 campaign of "Come Home," and an all new soundtrack.
- In 1999 the network produced "Na nossa frente, so você", with new graphics and music. The 64-second promo was used on-air for the first time in 2000; the slogan was used until 2004 with two songs composed for this. The 1st campaign spot (1999-2000) mirrored the Nine Network's 1997 promo spots but with an original soundtrack.

=== 2000s ===
SBT began the decade investing in movies, broadcasting a package of Disney (later moved to TV Globo) and Warner Bros. productions (the latter promoted in a one-hour network block). In 2001, the controversial reality show Casa dos Artistas, accused by many of being a copy of Endemol's Big Brother, marked the first time SBT led the Sunday-night ratings, aside from its Domingo Legal program becoming number one in the Sunday afternoon ratings.

Since 2003, with the ratings advances of Record and Rede Bandeirantes, SBT's ratings have declined. Two events that year marked the beginning of its problems:

- Early in the year Silvio Santos gave an interview with the TV-gossip magazine Contigo!, in which he stated that he was ill and had sold the SBT. Later, he claimed that this was intended as a joke.
- The "Gugu-PCC scandal": On September 7 Domingo Legal aired an interview with alleged members of the criminal group PCC, threatening the deputy mayor of São Paulo and the hosts of police reality programs on the competing TV Record and RedeTV! networks. Later, it was discovered that this was a hoax; the program was judicially suspended temporarily - and therefore off-the-air for one Sunday, its audience never recovered and Gugu Liberato (its host, once seen as Santos' successor) never regained his credibility.

In 2005, SBT started airing SBT Brasil, bringing news back to the network's evening schedule; the news operation had been debilitated with the defection of Bóris Casoy to Record in 1997 and the subsequent cancellation of TJ Brasil in that period. For this end, SBT hired Ana Paula Padrão, who had defected from Globo. The network released campaigns poking at Globo and creating puns with her surname saying "Globo no longer has standard" ("Padrão", her surname, is "standard" in Portuguese, with the joke being a reference to Globo's quality standards). In its early years, SBT Brasil had constant airtime fluctuations (from the initial 7:15pm slot; in 2007 it aired at 9:30pm), which would cause a decline in ratings.

Since then the SBT has aired the successful Rebelde and shows with child host Maisa Silva, who became popular; however, programs could change without previous announcement (even hosts were sometimes out of the loop), confusing the audience. In 2006 SBT celebrated its 25th anniversary in a deepening crisis.

SBT is the second-largest network in the country, vying for leadership with Rede Record. The CDT da Anhanguera is the second-largest television-production center in Brazil, behind Projac (owned by Rede Globo). Over 5,000 employees work around the clock at the SBT's 110 TV stations. In 2008 the network lost second place in the ratings to Record, but tied for second place the following year. In 2009 Liberato moved to Record after more than 20 years with the SBT; at the same time, the SBT signed presenters Roberto Justus and Eliana from Record. It also appeared on SKY Brasil, the last of the five major Brazilian networks to do so.

Recent programs include What's Your Talent, a local combination of Britain's Got Talent and Show de Calouros (created and hosted by Silvio Santos during the 1970s); a Brazilian version of 1 vs. 100; an annual telethon, which raised R$19 million in 2009; Kyle XY; the reality show Solitary; Smallville, Grey's Anatomy and De Frente with Gabi, a talk show featuring journalist Marilia Gabriela.

TV Alagoas left the network in September 2009 and to broadcast religious programs, and SBT executive director William Stoliar sued to ensure the network's availability there. It returned to the SBT on June 1, 2010, due to viewer pressure and late rent payments by religious programs.

In February 2014 the Communist Party of Brazil sends to the Federal Government a questioning, for which he cut around 75 million dollars in advertising the broadcaster, because of criticism that the journalist Rachel Sheherazade makes against the Government.

=== 2020s ===
While the network at large suffered from the effects of the COVID pandemic in the country, it found a renewed calling in sports. One after the other, the network pursued new sporting investments when it snagged the broadcasting rights for the Campeonato Carioca 2020 grand final, followed by a renewed commitment to the Copa Liberatores for the 2020–22 period. In 2021, left and right came contracts after contracts for sports broadcasts with SBT getting the nod as broadcaster to the 2021 Copa America, and a number of arena football and futsal events - a first in network history as SBT marked its 40th anniversary. Buoyed by the sporting successes against the competition the network revived its sports newscasts: Arena SBT, which originally premiered in 2014, returned in 2020, followed by the launch the following year of SBT Sports.

== Stations ==
TV station	City	State
SBT São Paulo	Osasco	São Paulo

== SBT staff ==
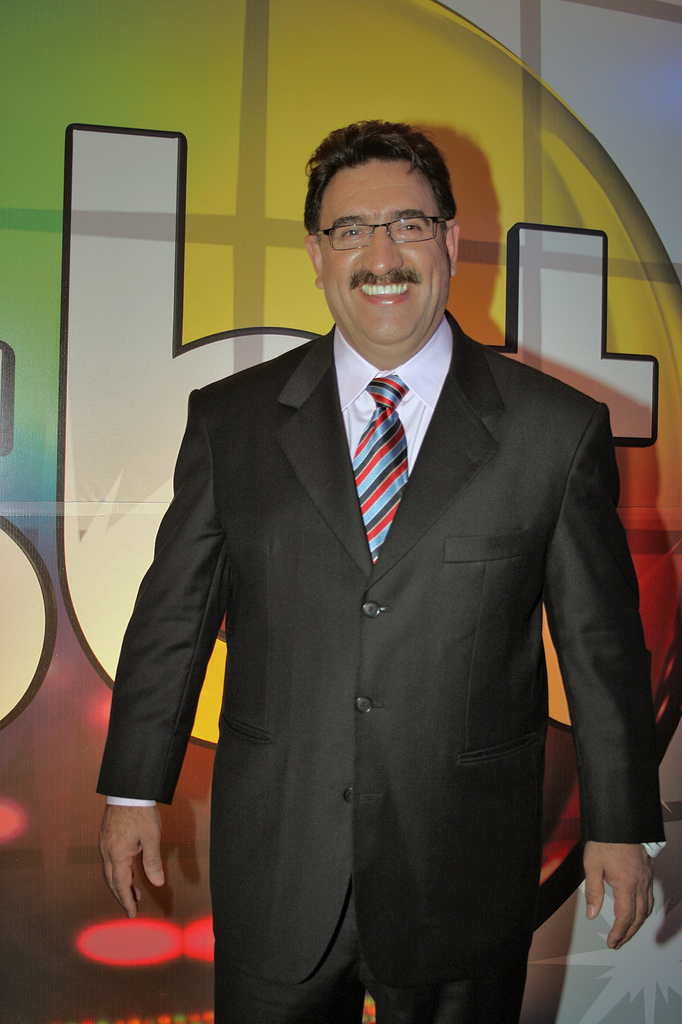
Carlos Roberto Massa, the popular and polemical "Ratinho (Little Mouse)"

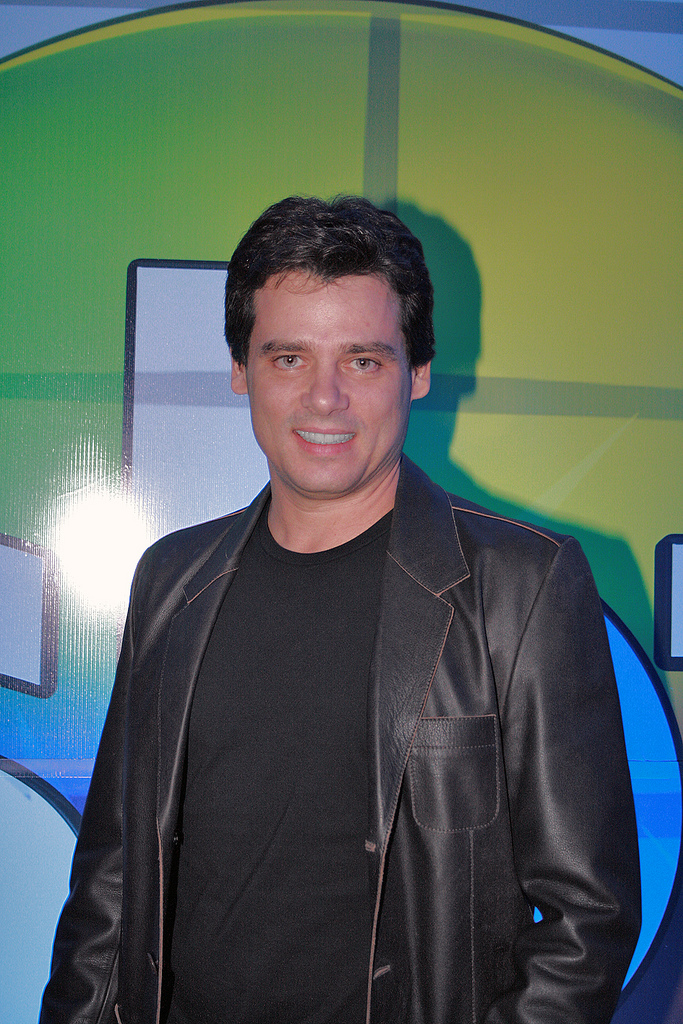
Celso Portiolli

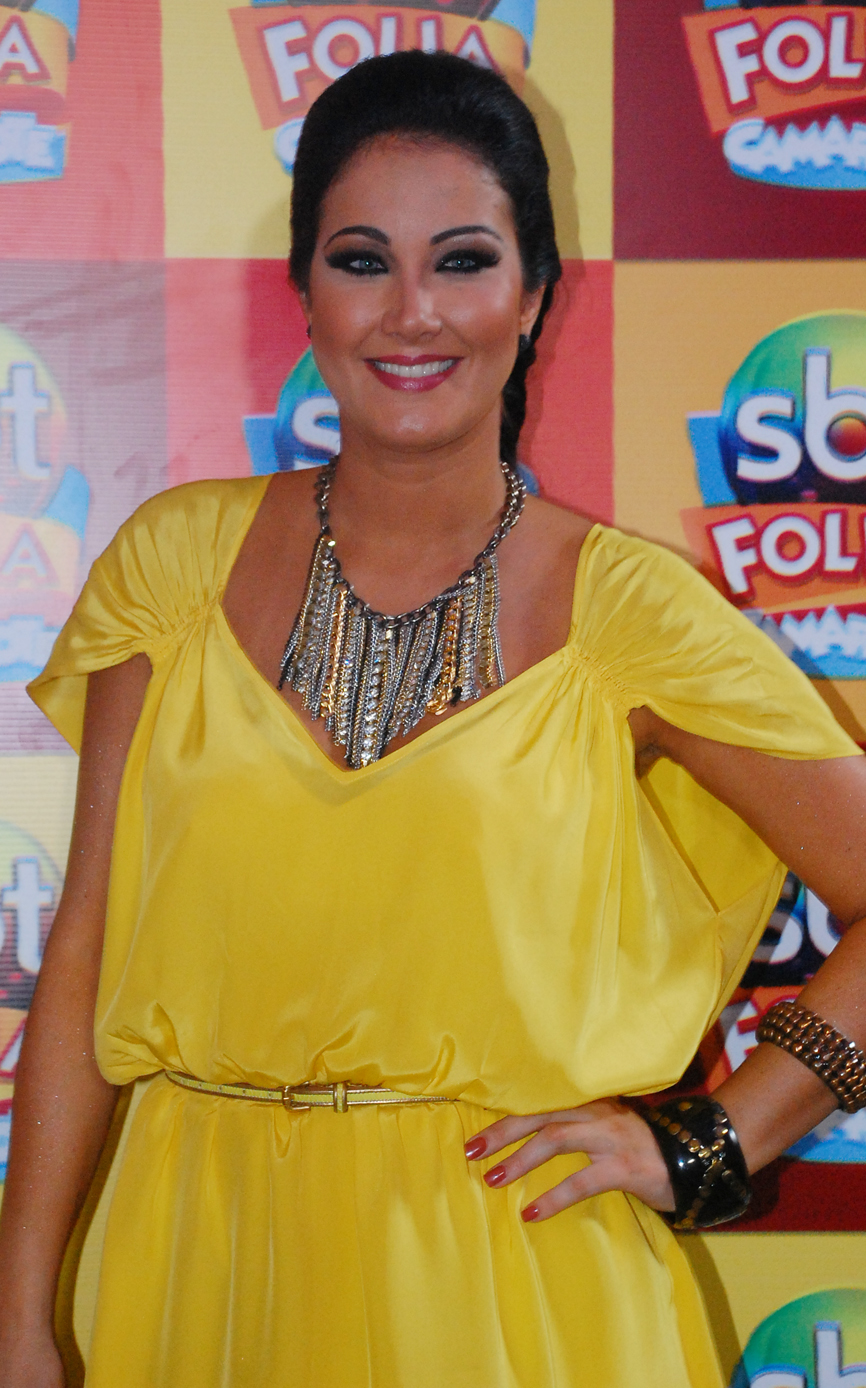
Helen Ganzarolli

Hosts

- Carlos Alberto de Nóbrega
- Celso Portiolli
- Christina Rocha
- Danilo Gentili
- Fabiana Karla
- Gabriel Cartolano
- Gaby Cabrini
- Helen Ganzarolli
- João Guilherme Silva
- Lucas Anderi
- Luís Ricardo
- Patati Patatá
- Patrícia Abravanel
- Ratinho
- Rebeca Abranavel
- Renata Kuerten
- Virginia Fonseca

News

- César Filho
- Dani Brandi
- Darlisson Dutra
- Geraldo Luís
- Lívia Zanolini
- Marcão do Povo
- Marcelo Casagrande
- Marco Pagetti
- Simone Queiroz, in between others

Sports

- Benjamin Back
- Kleber Gladiador
- Maurício Borges
- Mauro Beting
- Nadine Bastos
- Renata Saporito
- Tiago Leifert, in between others

Artists

- Alexandre Porpetone
- Buiú
- Clarisse Abujamra
- Giovani Braz
- Saulo Laranjeira
- Tuca Laranjeira
- Velson D'Souza, in between others

Writers

- Íris Abravanel

Directors

- Aldrin Mazzei (Esquadrão da Moda)
- Leandro Cipoloni (National Director for Journalism)
- Márcio Esquilo (Fofocalizando)
- Michael Utksin (Teleton)
- Rafael Belo
- Rubens Gargalaca Jr. (Domingo Legal)
- Silvia Abravanel (Sábado Animado)
- Tiago Galassi (Director for Sports)
- Walter Scaramuzzi (Programa do Ratinho and Teleton)

== Programs ==
=== History of programming ===
The SBT has most of its schedule dedicated to programming for children and pre-teens, and it is a popular network with young audiences. In 1998 it ran the longest children's programming block in Brazilian TV history with TV Cultura, from Sessão Desenho (a cartoon block) at 7:00 AM (after the morning newscast) until 9:00 PM (when the children's telenovela Chiquititas ended). The SBT promoted the 14-hour block as "SBT Kids".

While most TV stations in Brazil depend on domestic productions, the SBT relies on imports (mainly from Mexico and the US). Since 1984, El Chavo del Ocho (shown in Brazil as Chaves) is one of the station's most popular programs. The network had until 2014 an agreement with Warner Brothers, giving it an exclusivity deal for its sitcoms, dramas and films.

Mexican telenovelas have been a staple on the SBT, reaching their peak during the early 1990s with the child-oriented Carrusel, La usurpadora, El Privilegio de Amar and Luz Clarita and the popular "María trilogy" (María Mercedes, Marimar and María la del Barrio). Compared to subdued Brazilian telenovelas, Mexican soaps are considered tacky and exaggerated.

Other 1990s hits included Domingo Legal (Cool Sunday) (a Sunday variety show which was the SBT's highest-rated program, surpassing TV Globo), and the network was the most popular channel in Brazil for hours at a stretch. Domingo Legal was criticized for its sensationalism, and its ratings began to fall after the Primeiro Comando da Capital (PCC) scandal (see below); the show often ranks second in the ratings. Other popular programs included Programa do Ratinho (Ratinho's Show, with a similar format to The Jerry Springer Show), Show do Milhão (The Million Show, similar to Who Wants to Be a Millionaire?), Topa Tudo por Dinheiro (Variety show large audience that was aired on Sunday night between 1991 and 2001), Fantasia (Entertainment program where people could play games by phoning the program in order to earn money), and the Brazilian version of the Argentinean soap opera Chiquititas, popular with children.

For over 20 years the SBT held second place in the Brazilian television ratings (behind Rede Globo), but in February 2007 it was outpaced by Rede Record for the first time in São Paulo. However, after a period of resurgence which started in 2011, SBT successfully overtook Record for second place in June 2014.

Since their 1990s peak in popularity, Mexican telenovelas have been steadily declining in the ratings; the last popular Mexican soap operas were Carita de Ángel in the early 2000s and Rebelde in 2006. In 2001, SBT began remaking Mexican soaps with Brazilian actors. The first soaps (Picara Sonhadora and Marisol) did fairly well in the ratings; however, later soaps (Cristal, Os Ricos Também Choram and Maria Esperança, a version of the popular Maria Mercedes) were less popular.

In addition to Mexican soaps and their remakes, the channel also airs cartoons mornings and programs such as Ídolos (a Brazilian version of American Idol which later moved to TV Record), a Brazilian version of Supernanny, a version of Deal or No Deal (presented by Silvio Santos, who also presents many network programs), talent shows and a dating show. The network also airs movies and A Praça é Nossa (a long-running, popular comedy program).

=== Soap operas ===
- Pensão da Inocência (1982)
- Destino (1982)
- A Força do Amor (1982)
- A Leoa (1982)
- Conflito (1982–1983)
- Sombras do Passado (1983)
- Acorrentada (1983)
- A Ponte do Amor (1983)
- A Justiça de Deus (1983)
- Pecado de Amor (1983)
- Razão de Viver (1983)
- Anjo Maldito (1983)
- Vida Roubada (1983–1984)
- Meus Filhos, Minha Vida (1984–1985)
- Jerônimo (1984–1985)
- Joana (1984–1985)
- Jogo do Amor (1985)
- Uma Esperança no Ar (1985–1986)
- Cortina de Vidro (1989–1990)
- Brasileiras e Brasileiros (1990–1991)
- Alô, Doçura! (1990–1991)
- Grande Pai (1991–1992)
- A Justiça dos Homens (1993)
- Éramos Seis (1994)
- As Pupilas do Senhor Reitor (1994–1995)
- Sangue do Meu Sangue (1995–1996)
- Razão de Viver (1996)
- Colégio Brasil (1996)
- Antônio Alves, Taxista (1996)
- Brava Gente (1996–1997)
- Dona Anja (1996–1997)
- Os Ossos do Barão (1997)
- Chiquititas (1997–2001)
- Fascinação (1998)
- Teleteatro (1998–1999)
- Pérola Negra (1998–1999)
- O Direito de Nascer (2001)
- Pícara Sonhadora (2001)
- Amor e Ódio (2001–2002)
- Marisol (2002)
- Pequena Travessa (2002–2003)
- Jamais te Esquecerei (2003)
- Canavial de Paixões (2003–2004)
- Seus Olhos (2004)
- Esmeralda (2004–2005)
- Os Ricos Também Choram (2005)
- Cristal (2006)
- Maria Esperança (2007)
- Amigas & Rivais (2007–2008)
- Revelação (2008–2009)
- Vende-se um Véu de Noiva (2009)
- Uma Rosa com Amor (2010)
- Amor e Revolução (2011)
- Corações Feridos (2012)
- Carrossel (2012-2013)
- Chiquititas (2013-2015)
- Cúmplices de um Resgate (2015-2016)
- Carinha de Anjo (2016-2018)
- As Aventuras de Poliana (2018–2020)
- Poliana Moça (2022-2023)
- A Infância de Romeu e Julieta (2023)
- A Caverna Encantada (2024)

=== Reality and game shows ===
- Bake Off Brasil
- Júnior Bake Off Brasil
- Bake Off Brasil Celebrity
- BBQ Brasil (BBQ Champ)
- Hell's Kitchen: Cozinha sob Pressão
- Roda a Roda Jequiti (Wheel of Fortune)
- Programa Silvio Santos (Takeshi's Castle)
- Passa ou Repassa (Double Dare) - (Domingo Legal)
- Show do Milhão PicPay (Game Show)
- Quem Arrisca Ganha Mais (Game Show) - (Domingo Legal)
- Comprar É Bom, Levar É Melhor (Game Show) - (Domingo Legal)
- Wall Duet Brasil (The Wall Song) - (Ratinho)
- O Melhor (The Winner Is) - (Ratinho)
- Te Devo Essa! Brasil (Property_Brothers)
- Mestres da Sabotagem (Cutthroat Kitchen)
- Ex-Maridos Contra Ex-Mulheres - (future)
- O Mais Fraco Vai Embora (Weakest Link) - (future)
- Hotel dos Artistas (El hotel de los famosos) - (future)
- Famílias Frente a Frente (Family Food Fight)
- Pra Ganhar É Só Rodar
- Fábrica de Casamentos
- Jogo das Fichas
- Bolsa Família
- Nada além de Um Minuto (Minute to Win It)
- Rola ou Enrola? - (Eliana)
- Fenômenos - (Eliana)
- Esquadrão da Moda (What Not to Wear)
- Bomba! (Boom!) - (Programa Silvio Santos)
- Cabelo Pantene - O Reality (2017-2018)
- Qual é o Seu Talento? (What's Your Talent?)
- Caldeirão da Sorte (2016-2017)
- Duelo de Mães (2016-2017)
- Dance se Puder (2016) - (Eliana)
- Máquina da Fama (2013-2017)
- Esse Artista Sou Eu (Your Face Sounds Familiar) (2014)
- Os Paranormais (Psychic Challenge) (2014)
- Festival Sertanejo (2013-2014)
- Menino de Ouro (Football's Next Star) (2013-2014)
- Famoso Quem? (My Name Is) (2013)
- Amigos da Onça (Impractical Jokers) (2013)
- Vamos Brincar de Forca (2012-2013)
- Cante se Puder (Sing If You Can) (2011-2013)
- Se Ela Dança, Eu Danço (So You Think You Can Dance) (2011-2012)
- Esquadrão do Amor (2011-2012)
- Um Milhão na Mesa (The Million Pound Drop) (2011)
- Cantando no SBT (2011)
- SOS Casamento (2011)
- Romance no Escuro (Dating in the Dark) (2010-2011) - (Eliana)
- Solitários (Solitary) (2010)
- Meu Pai é Melhor que Seu Pai (My Dad Is Better Than Your Dad) (2010)
- Topa ou Não Topa (Deal or No Deal) (2006-2011)
- Um Contra Cem (1 vs. 100) (2009-2010)
- Você Se Lembra? (Amne$ia) (2009-2010)
- 10 Anos Mais Jovem (10 Years Younger) (2009)
- Identidade Secreta (Identity) (2009)
- Só Falta Esposa (2009)
- Astros (2008-2013)
- Supernanny (2008-2010)
- Nada Além da Verdade (The Moment of Truth) (2008-2010)
- Quem Manda É o Chefe (2008-2009)
- High School Musical: A Seleção (2008)
- Tentação (Temptation) (2007-2009)
- Você É mais Esperto que um Aluno da Quinta Série? (Are You Smarter than a 5th Grader?) (2007-2008)
- Quem Perde, Ganha (The Biggest Loser) (2007)
- Vinte e Um (Twenty-One) (2007)
- Namoro na TV (The Dating Game) (2007)
- Curtindo com Reais (2007)
- Curtindo com Crianças (2007)
- Você É o Jurado (2007)
- Ídolos (SBT) (Idols) (2006-2007)
- Bailando por um Sonho (2006)
- Family Feud Brasil (Family Feud) (2005-2006)
- Casamento à Moda Antiga (2005-2006)
- O Grande Perdedor (2005)
- O Conquistador do Fim do Mundo (2003)
- Xaveco-Se Rolar...Rolou (Singled Out) (1996-2001-2003-2004)
- Todos contra Um (2002-2005)
- Popstars Brasil (Popstars) (2002-2003)
- Ilha da Sedução (Temptation Island) (2002-2003)
- Sete e Meio (Seven and a half) (2002)
- Curtindo uma Viagem (2001-2002)
- Casa dos Artistas (Protagonistas) (2001-2002-2004)
- Audácia (Greed) (2000)
- Qual É a Música? (The Singing Bee) (1999-2008)
- Qual é a Musica? (Name That Tune) (1999-2005)
- Show do Milhão (Million Show) (1999-2004, 2009, 2024-)
- Gol Show (1997-2002)
- Passe A Palavra (Password) (1995)
- Nações Unidas (1992-1993)
- Cidade contra Cidade (1988-1989)
- TV Powww! (TV Powww) (1984-1989)
- Cinderella (Queen for a Day) (1981-1987)
- Ela Disse, Ele Disse (Tattletales) (1975-1986)
- Só Compra Quem Tem (Sale of the Century) (1960s-1970s, TVS)
- Casa dos Segredos (Secret Story) (canceled)
- Cinquenta (50–50) (uncertainty)
- Cocktail ((game show)) (1991-1992)
