= Family Food Fight (Australian TV series) =

Australian reality television series

- Genre: Cooking
- Judges: Matt Moran; Anna Polyviou; Tom Parker Bowles; Hayden Quinn
- Country of origin: Australia
- Original language: English
- No. of seasons: 2
- No. of episodes: 33

Production
- Executive producer: Tara McWilliams
- Production location: Melbourne Showgrounds
- Production company: Endemol Shine Australia

Original release
- Network: Nine Network
- Release: 30 October 2017 – 11 December 2018

Related
- Family Food Fight USA

Family Food Fight (abbreviated as FFF) is an Australian reality competition television series that aired on the Nine Network from 30 October 2017 until 11 December 2018. The series saw diverse and multi-generational Australian families go head-to-head in high-pressure cooking challenges inspired by real home cooking and family food traditions to win an ultimate prize of $100,000.

Although the first season of the series had disappointing ratings, a desire to sell the show internationally led it to be renewed for a second season, which premiered on 29 October 2018. Despite a number of international adaptations, the show struggled to find an audience locally and no further seasons have been commissioned.

== Production ==
The series was announced at Network Nine's upfronts in November 2016. Auditions opened in February 2017, searching for family teams of four people with all members required to be amateur cooks; auditions closed on 13 April 2017. In July 2017, Matt Moran, Hayden Quinn and Anna Polyviou were announced as judges of the series with Tom Parker Bowles to appear as a guest judge. In episode 15 it was announced that Parker Bowles would remain with the show for the finals, and so he appeared in all episodes.

Season 2 saw the teams reduced from four contestants to two. Hayden Quinn opted not to return as a judge for the second season.

== Contestants ==
=== Season 1 (2017) ===
Family	Members and Age	Home	Status
Shahrouk	Houda (43), Halla (45), Leeann (39) and Rouba (40)	Sydney	Winners
Butler	John (63), EJ (Elyse) (30), Kate (27) and Aleks (31)	Sydney	Runners-up
Panayides	George (69), Soulla (47), Con (44) and Fanos (35)	Melbourne	Eliminated 26 November 2017
Gibaldi	Pina (69), Rose (47), Frank (61) and Corrado (40)	Melbourne	Eliminated 19 November 2017
Sheppard	Deb (60), Gary (62), Tom (29) and Ruth (28)	Perth	Eliminated 12 November 2017
Nguyen	Davy (43), Sandra (41), Angel (16) and Trinity (15)	Sydney	Eliminated 5 November 2017

=== Season 2 (2018) ===
Family	Members and Age	Relationship	Home	Status
Giles	Bec (30) and Nicole (21)	Sisters	Sunshine Coast	Winners
Tartaglia	Leon (34) and Cory (29)	Brothers In Law	Perth	Runners-up
Samadi	Ria (25) and Saffa (21)	Sisters	Melbourne	Eliminated 10 December 2018
Alatini	Trish (44) and Ocean (25)	Mother and Daughter	Perth	Eliminated 3 December 2018
Pluchinotta	Pina(69) and Concetta (46)	Mother and Daughter	Melbourne	Eliminated 20 November 2018
Boumerhi	Lena (46) and Carl (26)	Mother and Son	Sydney	Eliminated 12 November 2018
Evans	Ben and Heather	Husband and Wife	Melbourne	Eliminated 4 November 2018
Cameron-Bradley	Yoshi (29) and Mahla (27)	Brother and Sister	Melbourne	Withdrew 31 October 2018

== Ratings ==
=== Season 1 (2017) ===
No.	Title	Air date	Timeslot	Overnight ratings		Consolidated ratings		Total viewers	Ref(s)
No.	Title	Air date	Timeslot	Viewers	Rank	Viewers	Rank	Total viewers	Ref(s)
1	Episode 1	30 October 2017	Monday 7:30pm	614,000	13	39,000	12	643,000	
2	Episode 2	31 October 2017	Tuesday 7:30pm	523,000	12	24,000	12	547,000	
3	Episode 3	1 November 2017	Wednesday 7:30pm	509,000	15	18,000	15	527,000	
4	Episode 4	5 November 2017	Sunday 7:00pm	525,000	9	21,000	9	546,000	
5	Episode 5	6 November 2017	Monday 7:30pm	493,000	15	17,000	16	510,000	
6	Episode 6	7 November 2017	Tuesday 7:30pm	558,000	15	21,000	15	579,000	
7	Episode 7	8 November 2017	Wednesday 7:30pm	502,000	15	14,000	15	516,000	
8	Episode 8	12 November 2017	Sunday 7:00pm	570,000	9	22,000	9	592,000	
9	Episode 9	13 November 2017	Monday 7:30pm	548,000	15	35,000	14	583,000	
10	Episode 10	14 November 2017	Tuesday 7:30pm	586,000	11	30,000	11	616,000	
11	Episode 11	16 November 2017	Thursday 7:30pm	442,000	14	7,000	14	449,000	
12	Episode 12	19 November 2017	Sunday 7:00pm	552,000	8	21,000	8	573,000	
13	Episode 13	20 November 2017	Monday 7:30pm	545,000	15	28,000	15	573,000	
14	Episode 14	21 November 2017	Tuesday 7:30pm	584,000	10	28,000	10	612,000	
15	Episode 15	22 November 2017	Wednesday 7:30pm	489,000	14	28,000	15	517,000	
16	Semi Final	26 November 2017	Sunday 7:00pm	648,000	8	12,000	10	660,000	
17	Grand Finale	27 November 2017	Monday 7:30pm	594,000	12	18,000	13	612,000	

=== Season 2 (2018) ===
No.	Title	Air date	Timeslot	Overnight ratings		Consolidated ratings		Total viewers	Ref(s)
No.	Title	Air date	Timeslot	Viewers	Rank	Viewers	Rank	Total viewers	Ref(s)
1	Episode 1	29 October 2018	Monday 7:30pm	411,000	17	—N/a	—N/a	411,000	
2	Episode 2	30 October 2018	Tuesday 7:30pm	359,000	17	—N/a	—N/a	359,000	
3	Episode 3	31 October 2018	Wednesday 7:30pm	380,000	19	—N/a	—N/a	380,000	
4	Semi Final	10 December 2018	Monday 7:30pm	436,000	16	—N/a	—N/a	436,000	
5	Grand Finale	11 December 2018	Tuesday 7:30pm	447,000	11	—N/a	—N/a	447,000	

== International versions ==
Country	Name	Host	Judges	TV station	Year(s) aired
Argentina	Familias Frente a Frente	Leandro "Chino" Leunis	Christophe Krywonis; Dolli Irigoyen; Mauricio Asta	Telefe	23 September – 9 December 2018
Brazil	Famílias Frente a Frente	Tiago Abravanel	Alê Costa; Carmem Virgínia; Gilda Bley	SBT	11 October – 20 December 2019
Denmark	Family Food Fight	Mattias Hundeboll	Hannah Grant; David Johansen	Kanal 5	24 January – 14 March 2019
Italy	Family Food Fight	N/A	Lidia Bastianich; Joe Bastianich; Antonino Cannavacciuolo	Sky Uno; TV8	12 March 2020 – 15 April 2021
Mexico	Familias frente al fuego	Inés Gómez Mont	Belén Alonso; Antonio de Livier; Carlos Gaytán	Las Estrellas	14 July – 18 August 2019
Poland	Family Food Fight. Pojedynek na smaki	N/A	Ewa Wachowicz; Piotr Gąsowski; Adam Borowicz	Polsat	1 September – 20 October 2021
Portugal	Famílias Frente a Frente	N/A	José Avillez; Filipa Gomes; Hugo Nascimento	RTP1	6 January – 31 March 2019
Switzerland	Family Food Fight	N/A	René Schudel; Petra Rudnik; Heinz Witschi	Sat. 1	31 August – 28 September 2019
United States	Family Food Fight	N/A	Ayesha Curry; Cat Cora; Graham Elliot	ABC	20 June – 15 August 2019

=== Argentina ===
In August 2018, the format to Family Food Fight was picked up by Argentine broadcaster Telefe. Endemol Shine Latino produced the series, which premiered on 23 September 2018.

=== Brazil ===
In July 2019, the format of Family Food Fight was picked up by Brazilian broadcaster SBT which ordered a ten-episode series titled Famílias Frente a Frente (Families Face to Face) featuring twelve Brazilian families facing off in the kitchen. Endemol Shine Brasil produced the series, which was hosted by Tiago Abravanel and first released on Amazon Prime Video. The series premiered on 11 October 2019.

=== Italy ===
In October 2019, a local version of Family Food Fight was announced with Lidia Bastianich, Joe Bastianich and Antonino Cannavacciuolo as judges. The show premiered in March 2020, initially on Sky Uno.

=== Mexico ===
In April 2019, it was confirmed that the Mexican broadcaster Televisa acquired the franchise Family Food Fight to adapt it in Mexico in collaboration with Endemol Shine Boomdog and would be entitled Familias frente al fuego (Families in front of the fire). Its presenter is Inés Gómez Mont. It premiered on Las Estrellas on 14 July 2019.

=== Portugal ===
In November 2018, the format to Family Food Fight was picked up by Portuguese broadcaster RTP1. Endemol Shine Iberia produced the series, which premiered in 2019, titled as Famílias Frente a Frente (Families Face to Face).

=== Switzerland ===
In April 2019, Sat.1 announced that it would produce a five-part adaptation of the format, which premiered on 31 August 2019.

=== United States ===
In June 2018, the format of Family Food Fight was picked up by American broadcaster ABC, which had ordered eight-episodes and featured eight American families facing off in the kitchen. Endemol Shine North America produced the series with cookbook author and food personality Ayesha Curry as both host and one of the judges. The series premiered on 20 June 2019.

== See also ==
- List of Australian television series
- List of programs broadcast by Nine Network
