= Os Paranormais =

Brazilian television series

- Official logo
- Genre: Reality television
- Based on: Psychic Challenge
- Presented by: Celso Portiolli
- Narrated by: Celso Portiolli
- Country of origin: Brazil
- Original language: Portuguese
- No. of seasons: 1
- No. of episodes: 13

Production
- Camera setup: Single-camera setup Multi-camera setup
- Running time: 60-70 minutes
- Production company: Cygnus Media

Original release
- Network: SBT
- Release: September 21 – December 21, 2014

Os Paranormais (English: The Paranormal) was a Brazilian television series, produced by Cygnus Media and broadcast as a segment of Sunday program Domingo Legal. Hosted by Celso Portiolli, it was based on the Dutch format Psychic Challenge, distributed and broadcast in more than eleven countries, including the Netherlands, Russia, United States, Peru, England, Ukraine, Norway, Denmark, Lithuania and Israel.

A team of paranormals compete to find the best one in Brazil. Among the contestants, wizards, holistic therapists, tarot readers and mediums. The winner of the program was the wizard Edu Scarfon, who had the highest score in the end and earned 50,000 reais (US$14.988,26 – 2017 dollars) in gold bars.

== Format ==
Produced by Cygnus Media in Brazil for Sunday program Domingo Legal, the program brought sixteen contestants in the premiere, twelve women and only four men. They demonstrated their skills in very objective challenges that also put the viewers to the test, interacting through digital platforms. The central issue is controversial, many people believe that it is possible to have a supernatural gift, whilst others discriminate the idea.

"This program addresses in an exempt way a theme that the whole population has an interest in - the paranormality. We are not going to unmask anyone let alone extol them. The audience will draw their own conclusions from the challenges. The format is successful in a number of countries and Brazil, with such a diversity of beliefs, is the most natural environment for this program.

— Carla Affonso, executive director of Cygnus Media.

The theme was for the first time seriously treated on a TV show in Brazil, where one and a half times someone appears bending silverware, using force of thought, predicting events or doing illusion. For being interesting and different, both surprised and amused the audience.

== Challenges ==
Divided into groups of four, each Sunday the participants presented themselves in well-elaborated challenges, using their instruments of work, such as tarot cards, pendulums or just intuition.

- First challenge (up to 20 points) - The easiest of the three, involved the guesswork and the contestants had to get things right like: whose famous personality is the photo inside a sealed envelope or who is the newly pregnant woman among some others not pregnant women.
- Second challenge (up to 20 points) - Mid-level, the participants had to feel energy and give as much information about: the life of a guest, where an object or person is hidden, what was in the past a now abandoned place.
- Third challenge (up to 40 points) - The most difficult, the participants were asked to entering real scenes of rapes, murders, disasters, tortures and so on. Their mission was to narrate what happened in that particular place and why, with as much detail as they could get.

=== Guests ===
- Episode 1 - Maurício Petiz, friend and manager of late Clodovil Hernandez.
- Episode 2 - Alexandre Frota and his wife Fabiana Frota. / Jorge Tadeu and Coronel Corrêa Leite, the former had his house hit by Flight TAM 402 and the latter worked on the rescue of the victims.
- Episode 3 - Hildebrando and Celia, the parents of the late Dinho (singer), vocalist of the band Mamonas Assassinas.
- Episode 4 - Walter Sperandio, one of the survivors of the fire in the Andraus Building.
- Episode 5 - Ilana Casoy, criminologist.
- Episode 6 - Cristina Christiano, SBT reporter.
- Episode 7 - Vanderlei de Mello and Silvio Colognesi Jr, Fire and Safety Corp. Colonel who witnessed the collapse at the Ladies First nightclub.
- Episode 8 - Igor de Souza, CBDA's director of Water Marathons. In 1997 he became the first and only Brazilian to swim through the English Channel. / Marcelo Faria de Barros, a journalist and co-author of the book Crimes Que Abalaram o Brasil.
- Episode 9 - DM, band. / Sandra Domingues, president of the NGO Justiça é o Que Se Busca.
- Episode 10 - Ilana Casoy, criminologist.
- Episode 11 - Carlos Alberto de Nóbrega, Brazilian TV host.
- Episode 12 - Paulo Klein, curator of art and friend of late painter Gustavo Rosa.
- Episode 13 - Nadja Haddad, news anchor. / Ilana Casoy, criminologist.

== Contestants ==
Contestant	Profession	Result
Edu Scarfon	Wizard	Winner on December 21, 2014
Selena F.	Therapist	2nd Place on December 21, 2014
Márcio Lambert	Tarot reader	3rd Place on December 21, 2014
Vandinha	Therapist	4th Place on December 21, 2014
Elias Luiz Bispo IV	Metaphysical	5th Place and 6th Place on December 14, 2014
Cathia D Gaya	Consultant	5th Place and 6th Place on December 14, 2014
Rosa Eliana	Therapist	7th Place on December 7, 2014
Silvia Brianna	Witch	8th Place on November 23, 2014
Iyá Vanju	Priestess	9th Place on November 16, 2014
Sandra Susi	Clairvoyant	10th Place on November 9, 2014
Maíra	Tarot reader	11th Place; November 2, 2014
Val	Missionary	12th Place on October 26, 2014
Luciá Küma	Tarot reader	13th Place on October 19, 2014
Ana Luz	Medium	14th Place on October 12, 2014
Lucas Nascimento	Babalorixá	15th Place on October 5, 2014
Vanessa Lucas	Medium	16th Place on September 28, 2014
