= Se rentan cuartos =

Mexican television series

- Genre: Sitcom
- Created by: David Hernández
- Starring: Itatí Cantoral; Paco Rueda; Yare Santana; Jorge Ortín; Armando Hernández; María Chacón; Carlos Espejel; Irving Peña
- Country of origin: Mexico
- Original language: Spanish
- No. of seasons: 6
- No. of episodes: 60

Production
- Production location: Mexico City, Mexico
- Production companies: Viacom International Studios; Endemol Shine Boomdog

Original release
- Network: Comedy Central Latin America
- Release: 30 October 2019 – 16 November 2022

Se rentan cuartos is a Mexican sitcom television series created by David Hernández and produced by Viacom International Studios and Endemol Shine Boomdog for Comedy Central Latin America. It premiered on 30 October 2019, and stars Itatí Cantoral, Armando Hernández, Paco Rueda, Yare Santana, Irving Peña, Carlos Espejel, María Chacón, and Jorge Ortín. On 29 October 2019, before its premiere it was confirmed that the series had been renewed for a second season to be released on 29 January 2020.

== Plot ==
Se rentan cuartos follows a wealthy family that becomes bankrupt and is forced to move to a house in a neighborhood of Mexico City. The family adjusts to its new circumstances and interacts with people from different social backgrounds.

== Cast ==
=== Main ===
- Itatí Cantoral as Graciela Garza De La Garza y Más Garza
- Paco Rueda as Bobby Garza De La Garza y Más Garza
- Yare Santana as Estefanía "Stef" Garza De La Garza y Más Garza
- Jorge Ortín as El Chofer
- Armando Hernández as José Ignacio "Pepenacho" Garza De La Garza y Más Garza
- María Chacón as Shantallé
- Carlos Espejel as Chicopasote
- Irving Peña as Tato
- Roberto Palazuelos (season 2)

=== Guest stars ===
- Alejandra Bogue (season 1)
- Luis Felipe Tovar (season 2)
- Kikín Fonseca (season 2)
- Ernesto Laguardia (season 2)
- Ramiro Fumazoni (season 2)
- Anabel Ferreira (season 2)
- Tony y Archie Balardi (season 2)
- Gustavo Munguía (season 2)
- Marcos Valdez (season 2)

== Episodes ==
Series	Episodes	Originally released	
Series	Episodes	First released	Last released
1	10	30 October 2019	18 December 2019
2	10	29 January 2020	5 April 2020
3	10	14 April 2021	9 June 2021
4	10	6 October 2021	1 December 2021
5	10	27 April 2022	22 June 2022
6	10	21 September 2022	16 November 2022

=== Season 1 (2019) ===
No. overall	No. in season	Title	Directed by	Written by	Original release date
1	1	"Cilantro 18"	Jorge Garza & Carlos Espejel	David Hernández	30 October 2019
2	2	"Los extranjeros"	Jorge Garza & Carlos Espejel	David Hernández	30 October 2019
3	3	"Jefe de manzana"	Jorge Garza & Carlos Espejel	David Hernández	6 November 2019
4	4	"La mafia del joder"	Jorge Garza & Carlos Espejel	Dexter Petrelli	13 November 2019
5	5	"Visita conyugal"	Jorge Garza & Carlos Espejel	David Hernández	20 November 2019
6	6	"Cruela Glamour"	Jorge Garza & Carlos Espejel	David Hernández	27 November 2019
7	7	"La secta"	Jorge Garza & Carlos Espejel	David Hernández	4 December 2019
8	8	"El adúltero"	Jorge Garza & Carlos Espejel	David Hernández	11 December 2019
9	9	"La tormenta"	Jorge Garza & Carlos Espejel	David Hernández	18 December 2019
10	10	"La mamá de Graciela"	Jorge Garza & Carlos Espejel	David Hernández	18 December 2019

=== Season 2 (2020) ===
No. overall	No. in season	Title	Directed by	Written by	Original release date
11	1	"La pelea de box"	Unknown	David Hernández	29 January 2020
12	2	"Cita porno"	Unknown	David Hernández	5 February 2020
13	3	"Día de perros"	Unknown	Dexter Petrelli	12 February 2020
14	4	"El cumpleaños de Graciela"	Unknown	David Hernández	19 February 2020
15	5	"El embarazo de Stef"	Unknown	David Hernández	26 February 2020
16	6	"El cadáver"	Unknown	David Hernández	4 March 2020
17	7	"El regreso de Chicopasote"	Unknown	David Hernández	11 March 2020
18	8	"La intervención"	Unknown	David Hernández	22 March 2020
19	9	"Un día de ricos"	Unknown	David Hernández	29 March 2020
20	10	"Hogar dulce hogar"	Unknown	David Hernández	5 April 2020

=== Season 3 (2021) ===
No. overall	No. in season	Title	Directed by	Written by	Original release date
21	1	"Y volver, volver, volver"	Unknown	Unknown	14 April 2021
22	2	"Morirte duele"	Unknown	Unknown	14 April 2021
23	3	"Y tu mamá tan Gay"	Unknown	Unknown	21 April 2021
24	4	"La batalla de Rap"	Unknown	Unknown	28 April 2021
25	5	"El ciego Verdaguer"	Unknown	Unknown	5 May 2021
26	6	"La sirvienta asesina"	Unknown	Unknown	12 May 2021
27	7	"El club secreto"	Unknown	Unknown	19 May 2021
28	8	"Pepenacho inválido"	Unknown	Unknown	26 May 2021
29	9	"Home Office"	Unknown	Unknown	2 June 2021
30	10	"La detención de Graciela"	Unknown	Unknown	9 October 2021

=== Season 4 (2021) ===
No. overall	No. in season	Title	Directed by	Written by	Original release date
31	1	"El karma de Shantalle"	Unknown	Unknown	6 October 2021
32	2	"El hijo del compadre"	Unknown	Unknown	6 October 2021
33	3	"La moto de Mamanacha"	Unknown	Unknown	13 October 2021
34	4	"El pentapenacho"	Unknown	Unknown	20 October 2021
35	5	"El exorcismo"	Unknown	Unknown	27 October 2021
36	6	"Rehenes"	Unknown	Unknown	3 November 2021
37	7	"Albergue 18"	Unknown	Unknown	10 November 2021
38	8	"Cena con los suegros"	Unknown	Unknown	17 November 2021
39	9	"Viaje de chicas"	Unknown	Unknown	24 November 2021
40	10	"Cilantrotépetl"	Unknown	Unknown	1 December 2021

=== Season 5 (2022) ===
No. overall	No. in season	Title	Original release date
41	1	"Dummie for Dummies"	27 April 2022
42	2	"La estética"	27 April 2022
43	3	"El Santo Niño Charro"	4 May 2022
44	4	"Desembarazados"	11 May 2022
45	5	"El mini Bobby"	18 May 2022
46	6	"La leyenda del niño muerto"	25 May 2022
47	7	"La caja del mago"	1 June 2022
48	8	"Hágalo usted mismo"	8 June 2022
49	9	"PepeNacho del futuro"	15 June 2022
50	10	"Salvando a Chicopasote"	22 June 2022

=== Season 6 (2022) ===
No. overall	No. in season	Title	Original release date
51	1	"La fiesta del abuelo"	21 September 2022
52	2	"La maldición Garza"	21 September 2022
53	3	"La ex no tan ex"	28 September 2022
54	4	"Las meganudes"	5 October 2022
55	5	"El asesor Político"	12 October 2022
56	6	"El famoso escritor de telenovelas"	19 October 2022
57	7	"Sor Shantalle"	26 October 2022
58	8	"La deuda"	2 November 2022
59	9	"El amigo del face"	9 November 2022
60	10	"La boda y Don Roberto"	16 November 2022
