= CDT da Anhanguera =

Coordinates: 23°28′32″S 46°46′39″W

CDT Anhanguera Complexo Anhanguera
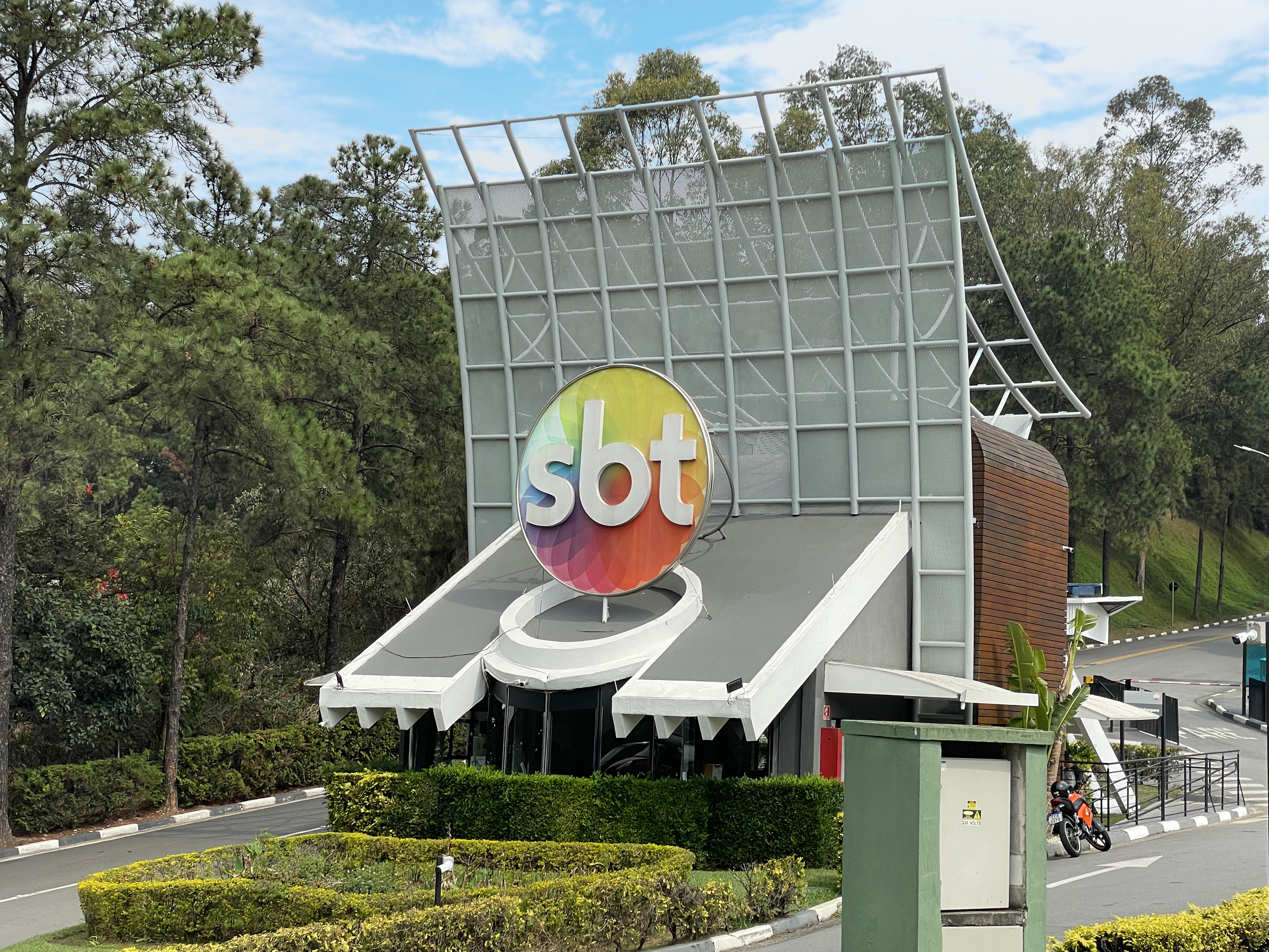
- Genre: Television and film production company
- Founded: 1996
- Headquarters: Osasco, SP, Brazil
- Owner: Grupo Silvio Santos
- Website: www.sbt.com.br/cdt

The Centro de Televisão da Anhanguera, popularly known as CDT da Anhanguera, is the second largest center of television production in Brazil and is the headquarters of the Brazilian TV company SBT. The complex is second only to the Estúdios Globo of TV Globo, located in Rio de Janeiro. The large complex was inaugurated in 1996 by Silvio Santos and it is located in the city of Osasco within the Greater São Paulo metro area. It concentrates all of the activity of SBT in a single facility.

== Size ==
While the Estúdios Globo of TV Globo has 399 thousand m2, the CDT da Anhanguera studios has 290 thousand m2. This makes the complex the second largest in the country.

== Infrastructure ==
The CDT da Anhanguera has 11 studios, sewage drainage, an electric power substation, a restaurant, snack bar, bank branch, convenience store, fitness center, internal transportation, medical and dental center, helipad, parking for 700 cars and as well as multi-sport courts.

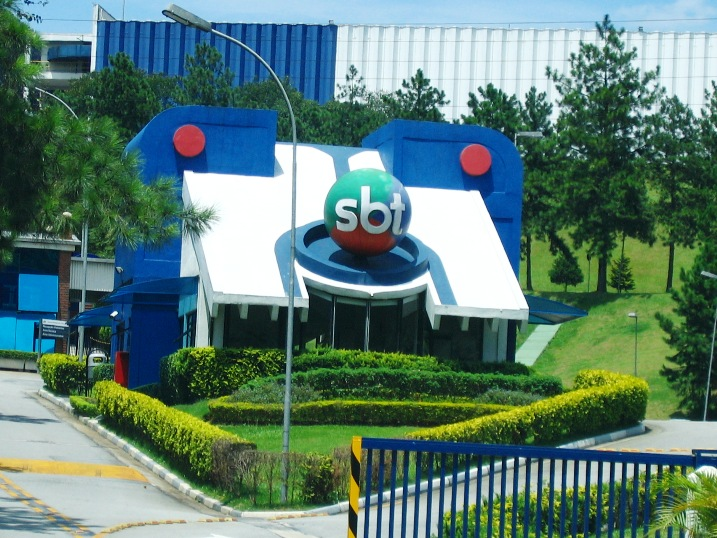
CDT da Anhanguera entrance.

- Studio 1 (Studio Hebe Camargo) - A Praça É Nossa, Domingo Legal.
- Studio 2 - The Noite, Sabadou com Virgínia.
- Studio 3 - Programa Silvio Santos, Roda a Roda, Tele Sena.
- Studio 4 - SBT Brasil, Fofocalizando, Alô Você!, Bom Dia & Cia, Bom dia Esperança.
- Studio 5 - TV Zyn.
- Studio 6 - Programa do Ratinho, Sábado Animado.
- Studio 7 - A Caverna Encantada.
- Studio 8 - A Caverna Encantada.
- Scenographic City - A Caverna Encantada.
- Newsroom - Primeiro Impacto, Tá na Hora, SBT Notícias, SBT Manhã.
- External Studio - Bake Off Brasil, Eita Lucas, The Voice Brasil.

Recording of programs in other places

- Studio S - Base of transport of the SBT and leases for MTV and ESPN.

== See also ==
- Grupo Silvio Santos
- SBT
