= Endemol Shine Boomdog =

Television production company

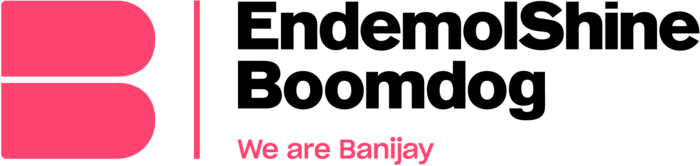
- Type: Subsidiary
- Industry: Television production
- Predecessor: Endemol Shine Latino; Boomdog
- Founded: 14 November 2017; 8 years ago
- Headquarters: Mexico City, Mexico
- Parent: Endemol Shine Group (2017–2020); Banijay Entertainment (2020–present)
- Website: endemolshinebd.com/en/

Endemol Shine Boomdog is the Mexican subsidiary of Banijay Entertainment, a global content production and distribution company. It was founded on 14 November 2017, as a merger of Endemol Shine Latino and Boomdog.

== History ==
On 14 November 2017, it was announced that Endemol Shine Latino, the Spanish-language division of Endemol Shine North America, and Mexico City-based production company Boomdog would merge to form Endemol Shine Boomdog. The merged company produces scripted and unscripted content for the U.S. Hispanic and Mexican TV markets.

On January 21, 2025, Endemol Shine Boomdog and Brazilian production company A Fábrica launched A Fábrica Mexico & U.S. Hispanic to produce scripted content for the Mexican and Latin American markets.

== Productions ==
Program is still in production.

Title	Network	Years	Notes
MasterChef Latino	Telemundo; Estrella TV	2018–2019; 2022	
Me caigo de risa	Canal 5	2018–present	Prior seasons produced by Endemol Shine Latino (2014–2017)
Mira quién baila	Univision	2018–2023	Prior seasons produced by Endemol Shine Latino (2010–2017)
Masterchef México	Azteca Uno	2018–present	Prior seasons produced by Endemol Shine Latino (2015–2017)
Nicky Jam: El Ganador	Netflix; Telemundo	2018	
LOL: Last One Laughing México	Amazon Prime Video	2018–present	
Familias frente al fuego	Las Estrellas	2019	
¿Te la juegas?	Azteca Uno	2019—2020	
¿Quién es la máscara?	Las Estrellas	2019–present	
Se rentan cuartos	Comedy Central	2019–2022	Co-production with Viacom International Studios
Tu cara me suena	Univision	2020–2022	
Súbete a Mi Moto	Amazon Prime Video	2020	Co-production with Somos Productions and Piñolywood Studios
La casa de los famosos	Telemundo	2021–present	
Todo por Lucy	Amazon Prime Video	2022	Co-production with Elefantec Global
¿Cuál es el bueno?	Canal 5	2022–present	
Volver a caer	Vix	2023	
La casa de los famosos México	Las Estrellas; Canal 5	2023–present	
Los 50	Telemundo	2023–present	
Wendy, perdida pero famosa	Vix	2023	
Vence a las estrellas	Canal 5	2024	
Enamorándonos	Imagen Televisión	2024–2025	Prior seasons before the revival, from 2016 to 2020, were produced by Sony Pictures Television for TV Azteca
Like Water for Chocolate	HBO Max	2024–present	Co-production with Ventanarosa Productions
Lo tomas o lo dejas	UniMás; Las Estrellas	2025–present	
