= Famílias Frente a Frente =

2019 Brazilian cooking reality TV series

- Genre: Reality competition Cooking show
- Based on: Family Food Fight
- Presented by: Tiago Abravanel
- Judges: Alê Costa; Carmem Virgínia; Gilda Bley
- Country of origin: Brazil
- Original language: Portuguese
- No. of seasons: 1
- No. of episodes: 10

Production
- Camera setup: Multiple-camera
- Running time: 90 minutes

Original release
- Network: Amazon Prime Video; SBT
- Release: October 10 – December 20, 2019

Famílias Frente a Frente (English: Families Face to Face, abbreviated as FFF) was a Brazilian cooking reality competition television series based on the Australian television series Family Food Fight.

The series was produced by Endemol Shine Brasil and aired by SBT. It was first released on Thursday, October 10, 2019 on Amazon Prime Video, premiering on SBT the following day, on Friday, October 11 at 11:15 p.m. (BRT / AMT).

Diverse and multi-generational Brazilian families go head-to-head in high-pressure cooking challenges inspired by real home cooking and family food traditions to win an ultimate prize of R$100.000.

== Contestants ==
(ages stated at time of contest)

Family	Members and age	Cuisine	Hometown	Status
Ferreira	Geovane (45), Luciana (43), Bárbara (29), Júlio César (24)	Center-West	Goiânia	Eliminated 1st on November 8, 2019
Silva; Returned on Nov. 29	Nilza (53), Rosania (49), Ariane (34), Gabriela (32)	Southeast	Batatais	Eliminated 2nd on November 15, 2019
Mokarzel	Lilian (58), Isabela (35), Fernanda (32), Larissa (32)	Arab	Campinas	Eliminated 3rd on November 22, 2019
Zular	Marie (79), Ady (48), Natália (45), Stella (21)	Jewish	São Paulo	Eliminated 4th on December 6, 2019
Silva	Nilza (53), Rosania (49), Ariane (34), Gabriela (32)	Southeast	Batatais	Eliminated 5th on December 13, 2019
Esaka	Guedes (61), Marie (59), Tsuyami (36), Yaemi (35)	Japanese	Mogi	Runner-up on December 20, 2019
Tobias	Jymmy (40), Odair (38), Ana Lúcia (35), Marco Antonio (26)	Brazilian	Nova Iguaçu	Winners on December 20, 2019

== Elimination chart ==
Place	Family	4	5	6	7	8	9	10
1	Tobias	WIN	WIN	RISK		RISK	RISK	WINNERS
2	Esaka	SAFE	RISK	RISK		WIN	WIN	RUNNER-UP
3	Silva	RISK	OUT		RET	WIN	OUT	
4	Zular	SAFE	SAFE	WIN		OUT		
5	Mokarzel	RISK	RISK	OUT	OUT			
6	Ferreira	OUT			OUT			

Key

The family won the competition.
The family was the runner-up.
The family won the challenge.
The family was safe from elimination.
The family was at risk of elimination.
The family was eliminated.
The family returned to the competition.
The family did not cook in this episode.

== Ratings and reception ==
=== Brazilian ratings ===
All numbers are in points and provided by Kantar Ibope Media.

Episode	Title	Air date	Timeslot (BRT)	SP viewers (in points)	Source
1	The Qualifiers 1	October 11, 2019	Friday 11:15 p.m.	7.8	
2	The Qualifiers 2	October 18, 2019	Friday 11:15 p.m.	6.7	
3	Top 6 – Part 1	November 1, 2019	Friday 11:15 p.m.	6.6	
4	Top 6 – Part 2	November 8, 2019	Friday 11:15 p.m.	5.6	
5	Top 5	November 15, 2019	Friday 11:15 p.m.	6.2	
6	Top 4	November 22, 2019	Friday 11:15 p.m.	5.3	
7	Reinstation Night	November 29, 2019	Friday 11:15 p.m.	5.9	
8	Top 4 Redux	December 6, 2019	Friday 11:15 p.m.	5.7	
9	Top 3	December 13, 2019	Friday 11:15 p.m.	7.7	
10	Winner announced	December 20, 2019	Friday 11:15 p.m.	7.9	

- In 2019, each point represents 254.892 households in 15 market cities in Brazil (73.015 households in São Paulo).
