= MasterChef Latino =

- Genre: Cooking show
- Created by: Franc Roddam
- Presented by: Aracely Arámbula; Gaby Espino
- Judges: Claudia Sandoval; Ennio Carota; Benito Molina; Adrián Herrera
- Country of origin: United States
- Original language: Spanish
- No. of seasons: 3
- No. of episodes: 41

Production
- Production company: Endemol Shine Boomdog

Original release
- Network: Telemundo (2018–2019); Estrella TV (2022)
- Release: January 14, 2018 – May 19, 2022

MasterChef Latino is an American Spanish-language competitive cooking reality television series based on the British series MasterChef. It aired on Telemundo from January 14, 2018 to August 11, 2019, for two seasons. It was on hiatus for three years until February 10, 2022, when a revival of the series began airing on Estrella TV. The series follows amateur and home chefs competing against one another for the title of MasterChef.

== History ==
The series was announced in May 2017 during Telemundo's upfront presentation for the 2017–18 television season. It premiered on January 14, 2018. The second season premiered on May 19, 2019. In September 2021, Estrella TV acquired the rights to the series. The first season of the revived series, or the 3rd season overall, began airing on February 10, 2022.

=== Series overview ===
Season	Contestants	Episodes	Originally released		Winner	Runner(s)-up
Season	Contestants	Episodes	First released	Last released	Winner	Runner(s)-up
1	14	13	January 14, 2018	April 8, 2018	Sindy Lazo	Andrés de Oliveira
2	15	13	May 19, 2019	August 11, 2019	Lauren Arboleda	Javier Seañez & John Pardo
3	17	15	February 10, 2022	May 19, 2022	Michelle Mathelín	Neuris Rivera

== Season 1 (2018) ==
The first season of MasterChef Latino premiered on Telemundo on January 14, 2018, and concluded on April 8, 2018. The season was judged by Claudia Sandoval, Ennio Carota and Benito Molina. The season was won by actress Sindy Lazo, with dog walker Andrés de Oliveira finishing as runner-up.

=== Contestants ===
Contestant	Age	Hometown	Occupation	Status
Sindy Lazo	38	Los Angeles, California	Actress	Winner April 8
Andrés de Oliveira	35	Fort Lauderdale, Florida	Dog walker	Runner-Up April 8
Lupita Hernández	35	Burbank, California	Housewife	Third April 8
Caddy Cabrera	43	New York, New York	Real estate agent	Eliminated April 1
Manuel Tol	23	Hollywood, California	Gardener	Eliminated April 1
Sor Juliana Cruz	50	Maricao, Puerto Rico	Dominican Sister	Eliminated March 25
Arzobispo Sánchez	27	Lynn, Massachusetts	Coach	Eliminated March 18
Ángel Robles	37	Queens, New York	Firefighter	Eliminated March 11
Ingrid Pereyra	26	New York, New York	Unemployed	Eliminated March 4
Dora Rojas	41	Modesto, California	Truck driver	Eliminated February 18
Pablo Kim	34	Placentia, California	Economist	Eliminated February 11
Ariadna Rodríguez	54	Stockton, California	Farmer	Eliminated February 4
Norma Santana	45	El Paso, Texas	Engineer	Eliminated January 28
Josue "El Bronco" Del Castillo	43	Happy Valley, Oregon	Broadcaster	Eliminated January 21

=== Elimination table ===
Place	Contestant	Episode																									
Place	Contestant	2		3			4		5		6		7			8		9		10		11		12			13
1	Sindy	WIN	IMM	IN	IN	WIN	WIN	IMM	HIGH	IMM	HIGH	IMM	IN	WIN	IMM	IN	IN	WIN	IMM	IN	IN	WIN	IMM	IN	IN	WIN	WINNER
2	Andrés	WIN	IMM	IN	HIGH	IMM	IN	WIN	HIGH	IMM	WIN	IMM	IN	IN	LOW	IN	IN	WIN	IMM	IN	IN	WIN	IMM	WIN	IMM	IMM	RUNNER-UP
3	Lupita	WIN	IMM	WIN	IMM	IMM	IN	IMM	IN	LOW	IN	LOW	IN	WIN	IMM	WIN	IMM	IN	IN	HIGH	IMM	IN	WIN	IN	WIN	IMM	THIRD
4	Caddy	WIN	IMM	IN	IN	IN	WIN	IMM	HIGH	IMM	IN	LOW	IN	WIN	IMM	IN	IN	WIN	IMM	HIGH	IMM	IN	LOW	IN	IN	ELIM	
4	Manuel	IN	IMM	IN	IN	LOW	WIN	IMM	IN	WIN	IN	WIN	IN	WIN	IMM	IN	WIN	IN	WIN	WIN	IMM	IN	WIN	IN	IN	ELIM	
6	Sor Juliana	IN	WIN	IN	IN	IN	IN	IN	HIGH	IMM	HIGH	IMM	IN	IN	LOW	WIN	IMM	WIN	IMM	HIGH	IMM	IN	ELIM				
7	Arzobispo	WIN	IMM	WIN	IMM	IMM	IN	IN	HIGH	IMM	IN	IMM	IN	IN	WIN	IN	LOW	IN	LOW	IN	ELIM						
8	Ángel	IN	LOW	IN	IN	WIN	WIN	IMM	IN	WIN	WIN	IMM	WIN	IMM	IMM	WIN	IMM	IN	ELIM								
9	Ingrid	WIN	IMM	IN	IN	LOW	WIN	IMM	WIN	IMM	HIGH	IMM	IN	IN	HIGH	IN	ELIM										
10	Dora	WIN	IMM	IN	IN	IN	IN	LOW	HIGH	IMM	IN	ELIM															
11	Pablo	IN	IN	IN	IN	WIN	WIN	IMM	IN	ELIM																	
12	Ariadna	IN	IN	IN	WIN	IMM	IN	ELIM																			
13	Norma	IN	LOW	IN	IN	ELIM																					
14	El Bronco	IN	ELIM																								

(WINNER) This cook won the competition.
(RUNNER-UP) This cook finished as a runner-up in the finals.
(THIRD) This cook finished as a third place in the finals.
(WIN) The cook won the individual challenge (Mystery Box Challenge/Skills Test or Elimination Test).
(WIN) The cook was on the winning team in the Team Challenge and directly advanced to the next round.
(HIGH) The cook was one of the top entries in the individual challenge but didn't win.
(IN) The cook wasn't selected as a top or bottom entry in an individual challenge.
(IN) The cook wasn't selected as a top or bottom entry in a team challenge.
(IMM) The cook didn't have to compete in that round of the competition and was safe from elimination.
(LOW) The cook was one of the bottom entries in an individual challenge, and was the last person to advance.
(ELIM) The cook was eliminated from MasterChef Latino.

== Season 2 (2019) ==
The second season of MasterChef Latino premiered on Telemundo on May 19, 2019, and concluded on August 11, 2019. Gaby Espino replaced Aracely Arámbula as host. Claudia Sandoval, Ennio Carota, and Benito Molina all returned as judges. The season was won by vlogger Lauren Arboleda, with businessman Javier Seañez and interior designer John Pardo finishing as co-runners-up.

=== Contestants ===
Contestant	Age	Hometown	Occupation	Mentor	Status
Lauren Arboleda	28	Miami, Florida	Vlogger	Ennio	Winner August 11
Javier Seañez	36	San Juan, Puerto Rico	Businessman	Claudia	Runners-up August 11
John Pardo	46	Miami, Florida	Interior designer	Benito	Runners-up August 11
Dubraska Wawi	47	Houston, Texas	Housewife	Benito	Eliminated August 4
Aurelio Rojas	26	New York, New York	Mixologist	Ennio	Eliminated July 28
Dennis Escalante	57	Los Angeles, California	Waiter	Benito	Eliminated July 28
Sara Ordóñez	33	Miami, Florida	Health coach	Claudia	Eliminated July 21
María Luisa Balbuena	38	Los Angeles, California	Security officer	Claudia	Eliminated July 14
Nancy Orantes	30	Los Angeles, California	Unemployed	Benito	Eliminated July 7
Noelián Ortiz	35	Canóvanas, Puerto Rico	Beauty coach	Claudia	Eliminated June 30
Miriam Palomino	75	Miami, Florida	Retired	Benito	Eliminated June 23
King Sam Chang	26	Miami, Florida	Student	Claudia	Eliminated June 16
David Nochebuena	52	Miami, Florida	CEO and data analyst	Ennio	Eliminated June 9
Ángel Cora	27	Fajardo, Puerto Rico	Handyman	Ennio	Eliminated June 2
Sergio Pérez	44	Chicago, Illinois	Waiter	Ennio	Eliminated May 26

=== Elimination table ===
Place	Contestant	Episode																										
Place	Contestant	2		3		4			5		6			7		8			9		10			11	12			13
1	Lauren	IN	IN	IN	IMM	IN	WIN	IMM	WIN	IMM	IN	WIN	IMM	IN	IMM	IN	WIN	IMM	IN	IN	IN	WIN	IMM	IN	IN	IN	IN	WINNER
2	Javier	IN	LOW	WIN	IMM	IN	IN	LOW	IN	IN	WIN	IMM	IMM	IN	IN	IN	WIN	IMM	WIN	IMM	WIN	IMM	IMM	IN	WIN	IMM	IMM	RUNNERS-UP
2	John	WIN	IMM	IN	IMM	IN	IN	LOW	IN	IN	IN	IN	IN	IN	IN	IN	IN	IN	WIN	IMM	IN	IN	IN	IN	IN	WIN	IMM	RUNNERS-UP
4	Dubraska	WIN	IMM	IN	WIN	IN	WIN	IMM	WIN	IMM	IN	IN	IN	IN	IMM	WIN	IMM	IMM	IN	LOW	IN	IN	WIN	IN	IN	IN	ELIM	
5	Aurelio	WIN	IMM	IN	IN	IN	IN	IN	WIN	IMM	IN	WIN	IMM	IN	WIN	IN	IN	IN	IN	IN	IN	IN	IN	ELIM				
5	Dennis	WIN	IMM	IN	IMM	IN	WIN	IMM	IN	IN	IN	WIN	IMM	IN	IN	IN	IN	LOW	WIN	IMM	IN	IN	IN	ELIM				
7	Sara	IN	LOW	WIN	IMM	IN	IN	WIN	IN	IN	IN	IN	IN	IN	IMM	WIN	IMM	IMM	WIN	IMM	IN	IN	ELIM					
8	María Luisa	WIN	IMM	WIN	IMM	WIN	IMM	IMM	IN	IN	IN	WIN	IMM	IN	LOW	IN	IN	IN	IN	ELIM								
9	Nancy	WIN	IMM	IN	IN	IN	WIN	IMM	WIN	IMM	IN	IN	LOW	IN	IMM	IN	IN	ELIM										
10	Noelián	WIN	IMM	WIN	IMM	IN	WIN	IMM	WIN	IMM	IN	IN	IN	IN	ELIM													
11	Miriam	WIN	IMM	IN	IN	IN	IN	IN	WIN	IMM	IN	IN	ELIM															
12	King	IN	WIN	WIN	IMM	IN	WIN	IMM	IN	ELIM																		
13	David	IN	IN	IN	LOW	IN	IN	ELIM																				
14	Ángel	IN	IN	IN	ELIM																							
15	Sergio	IN	ELIM																									

(WINNER) This cook won the competition.
(RUNNER-UP) This cook finished as a runner-up in the finals.
(THIRD) This cook finished as a third place in the finals.
(WIN) The cook won the individual challenge (Mystery Box Challenge/Skills Test or Elimination Test).
(WIN) The cook was on the winning team in the Team Challenge and directly advanced to the next round.
(IN) The cook wasn't selected as a top or bottom entry in an individual challenge.
(IN) The cook wasn't selected as a top or bottom entry in a team challenge.
(IMM) The cook didn't have to compete in that round of the competition and was safe from elimination.
(LOW) The cook was one of the bottom entries in an individual challenge, and was the last person to advance.
(ELIM) The cook was eliminated from MasterChef Latino.

== Season 3 (2022) ==
The third season of MasterChef Latino premiered on Estrella TV on February 10, 2022, and concluded on May 19, 2022. This is the first season not to have a host. Claudia Sandoval and Benito Molina returned as judges from the previous season, while Adrián Herrera joined as a new judge. The season was won by businesswoman Michelle Mathelín, with medical assistant Neuris Rivera finishing as runner-up.

=== Contestants ===
Contestant	Age	Hometown	Occupation	Status
Michelle Mathelín	39	Acapulco, Guerrero	Businesswoman	Winner May 19
Neuris Rivera	37	Houston, Texas	Medical assistant	Runner-Up May 19
Dalia González	52	Sacramento, California	Stylist	Third May 19
Christopher Basteris	27	Mérida, Yucatán	Instagrammer	Eliminated May 12
Rafael Gabeiras	33	Mexico City, Mexico	Lecturer	Eliminated May 5
Lorena de Cristófaro	53	Phoenix, Arizona	Art teacher	Eliminated April 28
Juan Rodríguez	25	Orizaba, Veracruz	Administrative assistant	Eliminated April 21
Lourdes Andonie	31	Monterrey, Nuevo León	Businesswoman	Eliminated April 14
Lulú Armendáriz	54	Los Angeles, California	Accounting executive	Eliminated April 7
Elvia Rivera	47	San Juan, Puerto Rico	Actress	Eliminated March 31
Luis Ángel Esquivel	50	Morelia, Michoacán	Merchant	Withdrew March 24
Freddy Hidalgo	31	Mexico City, Mexico	Actor	Eliminated March 17
César Tolano	34	Chattanooga, Tennessee	Businessman	Eliminated March 10
Mónica Patiño	38	Mexico City, Mexico	Housewife	Eliminated March 3
Jesús Segovia	42	Dallas, Texas	Car salesman	Eliminated February 24
Jesús Manuel Ponce	33	Monterrey, Nuevo León	TikToker	Eliminated February 17
Raquel Gad	47	Albany, New York	Housewife	Withdrew February 17

=== Elimination table ===
Place	Contestant	Episode																											
Place	Contestant	2		3		4		5		6			7		8		9		10		11		12		13		14		15
1	Michelle	WIN	IMM	HIGH	IMM	WIN	IMM	HIGH	IMM	IN	LOW	WIN	IN	WIN	IN	WIN	IN	IN	IN	WIN	HIGH	IMM	IN	WIN	IN	LOW	WIN	IMM	WINNER
2	Neuris	HIGH	IMM	IN	IN	WIN	IMM	HIGH	IMM	WIN	IMM	IMM	IN	LOW	WIN	IMM	WIN	IMM	IN	IN	WIN	IMM	IN	IN	WIN	IMM	IN	LOW	RUNNER-UP
3	Dalia	IN	WIN	IN	LOW	WIN	IMM	HIGH	IMM	LOW	WIN	IMM	IN	IN	IN	IN	IN	WIN	IN	IN	IN	WIN	WIN	IMM	IN	WIN	IN	WIN	THIRD
4	Christopher	HIGH	IMM	HIGH	IMM	WIN	IMM	HIGH	IMM	WIN	IMM	IMM	IN	IN	IN	IN	WIN	IMM	WIN	IMM	IN	IN	IN	IN	IN	WIN	IN	ELIM	
5	Rafael	HIGH	IMM	HIGH	IMM	WIN	IMM	IN	WIN	LOW	WIN	IMM	IMM	IMM	WIN	LOW	WIN	IMM	WIN	IMM	IN	LOW	IN	LOW	IN	ELIM			
6	Lorena	IN	WIN	HIGH	IMM	WIN	IMM	IN	IN	LOW	LOW	LOW	IN	WIN	WIN	IMM	IN	IN	IN	IN	IN	WIN	IN	ELIM					
7	Juan	HIGH	IMM	WIN	IMM	IN	LOW	IN	IN	WIN	IMM	IMM	IN	LOW^{2}	WIN	IMM	IN	LOW	IN	LOW	IN	ELIM							
8	Lourdes	HIGH	IMM	HIGH	IMM	IN	IN	WIN	IMM	IN	LOW	WIN	WIN	IMM	IN	WIN	IN	WIN	IN	ELIM									
9	Lulú	IN	IN	IN	IN	IN	IN	IN	IN	IN	WIN	IMM	IN	IN	IN	LOW	IN	ELIM											
10	Elvia	IN	LOW	IN	WIN	IN	IN	IN	WIN	WIN	IMM	IMM	IN	IN	—N/a^{4}	ELIM													
11	Luis Ángel	IN	WIN	IN	IN	IN	WIN	IN	IN	IN	LOW	WIN	WIN	WDR^{3}															
12	Freddy	HIGH	IMM	HIGH	IMM	WIN	IMM	IN	LOW	LOW	LOW	ELIM																	
13	César	IN	WIN	IN	LOW	IN	IN	IN	ELIM																				
14	Mónica	IN	IN	IN	LOW	IN	ELIM																						
15	Jesús	WIN	IMM	IN	ELIM																								
16	Jesús Manuel	IN	ELIM																										
17	Raquel	WDR^{1}																											

^Note 1: Raquel decided to withdraw from the competition for personal reasons.
^Note 2: Juan was originally set to be eliminated, but was allowed to remain in the completion due to Luis Ángel's withdrawal.
^Note 3: Luis Ángel decided to withdraw from the competition due to health problems.
^Note 4: Elvia was unable to participate in the team challenge for personal reasons.

(WINNER) This cook won the competition.
(RUNNER-UP) This cook finished as a runner-up in the finals.
(THIRD) This cook finished as a third place in the finals.
(WIN) The cook won the individual challenge (Mystery Box Challenge/Skills Test or Elimination Test).
(WIN) The cook was on the winning team in the Team Challenge and directly advanced to the next round.
(HIGH) The cook was one of the top entries in the individual challenge but didn't win.
(IN) The cook wasn't selected as a top or bottom entry in an individual challenge.
(IN) The cook wasn't selected as a top or bottom entry in a team challenge.
(IMM) The cook didn't have to compete in that round of the competition and was safe from elimination.
(LOW) The cook was one of the bottom entries in an individual challenge, and was the last person to advance.
(LOW) The cook was one of the bottom entries in the Team Challenge and they advanced.
(WDR) The cook withdrew from the competition.
(ELIM) The cook was eliminated from MasterChef Latino.

== See also ==
- Johana Clavel
