= Familias frente al fuego =

Mexican cooking reality competition television series

- Genre: Cooking show; Reality competition
- Based on: Family Food Fight
- Presented by: Inés Gómez Mont
- Judges: Belén Alonso; Antonio de Livier; Carlos Gaytán
- Country of origin: United States
- Original language: English
- No. of seasons: 1
- No. of episodes: 6

Production
- Production companies: Televisa; Endemol Shine Boomdog

Original release
- Network: Las Estrellas
- Release: July 14 – August 18, 2019

Familias frente al fuego (abbreviated as FFF) is a Mexican cooking reality competition television series based on the Australian television series, Family Food Fight. The series is produced by Televisa in collaboration with Endemol Shine Boomdog. It premiered on Las Estrellas on July 14, 2019, and consisted of 6 episodes.

== Format ==
Eight families, from different parts of Mexico, will face off week by week to win the grand prize of 1.5 million pesos. To be successful, participants must pass the challenges that the judges will evaluate in each episode. The judges, with different specialties, are in charge, week by week, of trying to find the family that cooks the best. The eight teams will be eliminated one by one until one family earns the winner title.

== Contestants ==
Family	Members	Relationship	Hometown	Status
Wong	Cristina, Christian and Mónica	Mom, son and cousin	Sinaloa	Eliminated 1st (July 14, 2019)
Ek	Hermelinda, Socorro and Genny	Friends	Yucatán	Eliminated 2nd (July 14, 2019)
Gudiño	Daniel, Javier and Farid	Brothers and friend	Mexico City	Eliminated 3rd (July 21, 2019)
Vásquez	Giorgi, Lula and Antonio	Mom, daughter and boyfriend	Oaxaca	Eliminated 4th (July 28, 2019)
Bárcenas	Ruth, Dulce and Marcela	Mom, daughter and aunt	Mexico City	Eliminated 5th (August 11, 2019)
Toledo	Vianey, Yanko and Licha	Mother, son and maid	State of Mexico	Runners-up (August 18, 2019)
Merido	Jéssica, Andrea and Viridiana	Sisters	Jalisco	Runners-up (August 18, 2019)
Nahum	Lourdes, Alex and Elízabeth	Mother, son and sister-in-law	Mexico City	Winners (August 18, 2019)

== Elimination chart ==
Place	Family	Episodes					
Place	Family	1	2	3	4 (Note: In Episode 4, due to the complexity of the performed challenges, the judges determined that none of the families should leave, therefore, there was no elimination.)	5	6
1	Nahum	WIN	WIN	SAFE	WIN	WIN	WINNERS
2/3	Merido	SAFE	SAFE	SAFE	WIN	SAFE	RUNNERS-UP
2/3	Toledo	WIN	SAFE	SAFE	WIN	WIN	RUNNERS-UP
4	Bárcenas	WIN	SAFE	WIN	WIN	ELIM	
5	Vásquez	SAFE	SAFE	ELIM			
6	Gudiño	WIN	ELIM				
7	Ek	ELIM					
8	Wong	ELIM					

The family won the competition.
The family finished as runner-up in the finals.
The family won the challenge and did not have to compete in the elimination round.
The family was safe from elimination.
The family was eliminated from the competition.

== Episodes ==
No.	Title	Original release date	Mexico viewers (millions)
1	"Programa 1"	14 July 2019	1.60
2	"Programa 2"	21 July 2019	1.10
3	"Programa 3"	28 July 2019	1.60
4	"Programa 4"	4 August 2019	1.00
5	"Programa 5"	11 August 2019	1.10
6	"Gran Final"	18 August 2019	0.89

== Ratings ==
The show initially aired at 8:30pm CT. After three episodes with low ratings, Televisa moved the show to 7pm CT, beginning 4 August 2019.

Viewership and ratings per season of Familias frente al fuego
Season	Episodes	First aired		Last aired		Avg. viewers (millions)
Season	Episodes	Date	Viewers (millions)	Date	Viewers (millions)	Avg. viewers (millions)
1	6	14 July 2019	1.60	18 August 2019	0.89	1.21
