= Johana Clavel =

Venezuelan cook and television personality

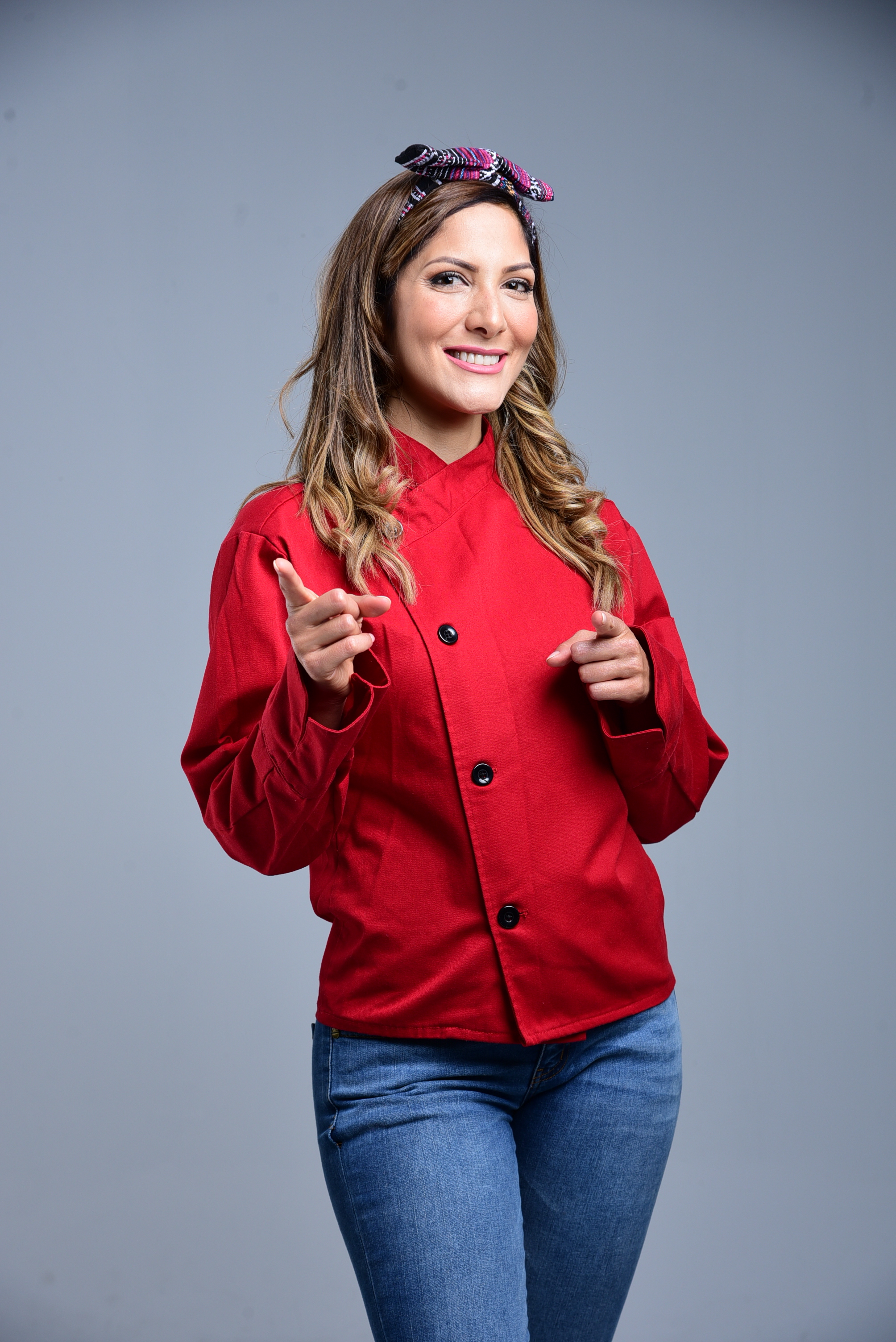
- Born: 10 November 1985 (age 40); Maracaibo, Venezuela
- Occupations: Chef, television personality, businesswoman
- Employer(s): Telemundo; Univisión ¡Hola! TV

Johana Clavel (born 10 November 1985) is a Venezuelan cook, entrepreneur and television personality, that has been featured and several television programs in the Telemundo, ¡Hola! TV and the Univisión networks. She also founded the Ligero Express restaurant chain with premises in her home country Venezuela and in the United States. In 2019 she published the book Cocina latina ligera through Penguin Random House.

== Early life and education ==
Clavel was born in 1985 in Maracaibo, capital of the Zulia state in Venezuela, Since her childhood she became interested in cooking and in her adolescence she was diagnosed with a heart condition that forced her to drastically change her eating habits. This new style of healthy gastronomy led her to become certified as a Chef of International Cuisine at the Zi Teresa Culinary Arts Center in her home country in the mid-2010s.

== Career ==
In 2012 she founded Ligero Express, a restaurant chain dedicated to healthy dishes and desserts that started operations in Venezuela and in 2016 expanded to Miami. She worked as executive chef of the company between 2012 and 2018. Parallel to her work in the company, Clavel has worked as a lecturer, giving talks and courses on healthy cooking and on the concept of the "art of substitution", which consists of changing ingredients that are harmful to health for those that do not generate negative effects on the body. She has conducted workshops in Venezuela, Colombia, the United States and Mexico, and as of 2020 has been the Latin American ambassador for the American brand Cuisinart.

In 2019 she published her first book through Penguin Random House publishing house, entitled Cocina latina ligera: recetas y consejos para una vida más saludable, in which she presents nearly 200 healthy cooking options. She also contributed recipes to the publications Reta tu vida by José Fernández and El reto de las seis semanas by Klara Senior and has published articles in both the Miami digital magazine Éxito con tacones and in the newspaper El Venezolano. In July 2020 she was invited by the People en Español magazine to host a series of virtual events for the Latino community.

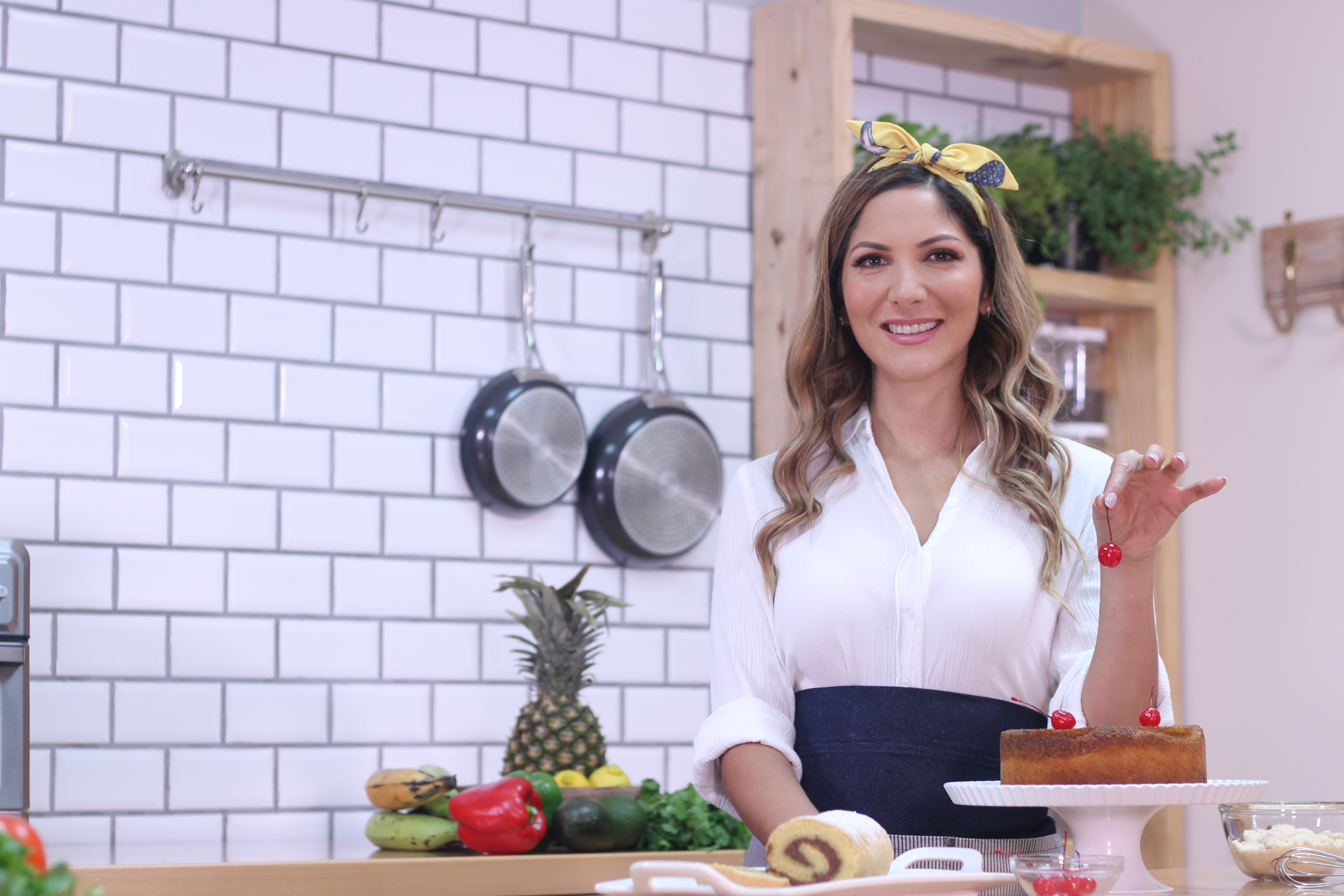
Johana Clavel en su cocina estudio en Miami

Clavel has recorded appearances on several culinary-themed television programs. In 2019, she was a guest on Telemundo network's MasterChef Latino, where she conducted a class on healthy desserts with the contestants. She was also featured in the cooking segment of the variety show Mujer de hoy on Telemundo, Univision's morning show ¡Despierta America!, TeleMiami's La Hora del Brunch and the shows Tu bebé on Vme TV channel, Mi casa es tu casa on EVTV Miami, and La Hora Hola on ¡Hola! TV.

== Personal life ==
Clavel has been married to chef Álvaro Finol since 2006. The couple has two sons, Álvaro Rafael and Alan David. She currently lives in Miami and conducts from her kitchen studio the cooking workshops that she transmits through her social networks.
