= Buiú =

Buiú is a Brazilian nickname. Notable people with the name include:

- Buiú (footballer, born 1980), full name Aldieres Joaquim dos Santos Neto, Brazilian footballer
- Buiú (footballer, born 1996), full name Marcos Ytalo Benício da Silva, Brazilian footballer
