= Ayesha Curry =

Canadian-American actress (born 1989)

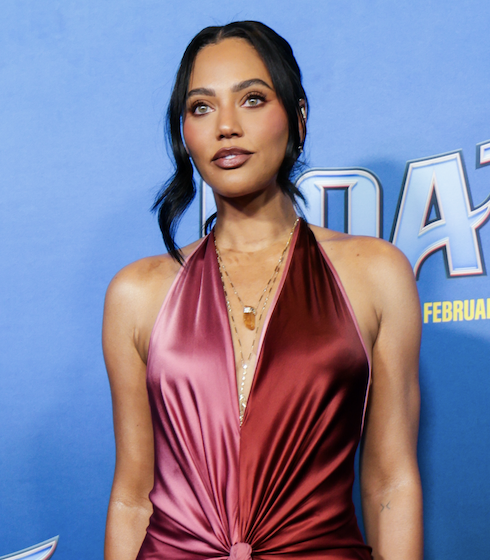
- Curry at GOAT Premiere in Los Angeles in 2026
- Born: Ayesha Disa Alexander; March 23, 1989 (age 37); Markham, Ontario, Canada
- Citizenship: Canada; United States
- Occupations: Actress; author; television personality; cook
- Years active: 2008–present
- Television: Cooking with the Currys; Ayesha's Homemade; The Great American Baking Show
- Spouse: Stephen Curry (m. 2011)
- Children: 4

Ayesha Disa Curry (née Alexander; March 23, 1989) is a Canadian-American businesswoman, cook, restaurateur, actress, writer and philanthropist.

She is the founder and CEO of Sweet July, a lifestyle brand empowering and celebrating women and BIPOC creators. Curry is also the co-founder of Domaine Curry, a premium wine brand aiming to define and lead the wine category for Black and multicultural women.

In 2011, she married basketball player Stephen Curry, with whom she has four children.

== Early life ==
Curry was born in Ontario, Canada, and raised in Markham until age 14, when she moved to Charlotte, North Carolina. Her mother is of Afro-Jamaican and Chinese-Jamaican descent, and her father is of mixed African-American and Polish descent. She developed an interest in cooking at a young age, influenced by the food prepared in her home and community.

== Career ==
After graduating from high school, Curry moved to Los Angeles to pursue acting, appearing primarily in minor roles. Her early credits include the short film Underground Street Flippers (2009), the television film Dan's Detour of Life (2008), and the direct-to-DVD film Love for Sale (2008).

In 2008, she had a starring role as Keeley Hawkins in the drama series Whittaker Bay, which aired for eight episodes. She later appeared in guest roles on several television series, including Hannah Montana (2009), Gary Unmarried (2009), and Good Luck Charlie (2010).

Curry gained wider recognition in culinary media after launching a food blog and YouTube channel. She hosted the Food Network series Ayesha’s Homemade (also known as Ayesha’s Home Kitchen) beginning in 2016. She has appeared as a judge or host on programs such as Chopped Junior, Guy’s Grocery Games, The Rachael Ray Show, Family Food Fight, and About Last Night.

In 2014, she founded Little Lights of Mine, a company selling extra virgin olive oil, donating 10% of all proceeds to No Kid Hungry.

Curry has authored multiple cookbooks, including The Seasoned Life (2016) and The Full Plate (2020). Both titles appeared on The New York Times Best Seller List.

In 2016, Curry collaborated with chef Michael Mina on The Mina Test Kitchen of International Smoke, a Bay Area pop-up restaurant, which expanded into a San Francisco location in November 2017 which closed in May 2026.

In 2017, Curry became a brand ambassador for CoverGirl, becoming the first food personality to represent the cosmetics brand.

Curry launched her lifestyle brand, Sweet July, in 2019. The brand includes a brick-and-mortar café in Santa Monica, Sweet July Magazine, Sweet July Productions, Sweet July Skin, and Sweet July Books. Products from both the skincare line and home collection have been recognized in top publications and have received numerous awards including being named one of Oprah's Favorite Things in both 2023 and 2024.

In July 2019, Curry and her husband founded their Eat. Learn. Play. Foundation in Oakland, California, a non-profit organization focused on improving the well-being of children through access to nutrition, education, and physical activity. Since its founding, the foundation has invested over $90 million in the Oakland Unified School District and surrounding communities through its “Whole Child, Whole School” approach, delivering more than 25 million meals to children and families, modernizing libraries and cafeterias, renovating schoolyards and gymnasiums, and expanding access to youth sports.

In April 2021, Curry delivered a virtual testimony before the U.S. House Committee on Rules on behalf of No Kid Hungry, advocating for strengthened federal nutrition programs to combat child hunger in the United States.

In 2024, she and her husband joined Michelle Obama as investors and brand partners in PLEZi Nutrition, a food and beverage company Obama co-founded in 2023 focused on children's nutrition. They later collaborated on the launch of PLEZi Hydration, an extension of the brand's product line.

She returned to acting in 2024, starring as Heather in the Netflix romantic comedy Irish Wish. She later appeared in the Hulu film Joy to the World opposite Chad Michael Murray and Emmanuelle Chriqui. In 2026, she voiced the character Carol in Sony Pictures Animation's animated feature film GOAT, alongside Steph Curry, Caleb McLaughlin, Gabrielle Union and Jenifer Lewis.

== Sweet July ==
Sweet July Skin is Curry's clean and culturally inspired skincare line, launched in 2023 as a natural extension of the Sweet July lifestyle brand. The line is rooted in Curry's Jamaican heritage and culinary background, using Caribbean superfood-inspired formulas that blend nutrient-rich botanicals such as guava, papaya, and soursop with effective skincare actives. The brand positions its products as sensorial “recipes” for daily self-care, offering a skincare routine designed to evoke an island experience.

Products from Sweet July Skin are formulated to be clean, vegan, paraben-free, and cruelty-free. Since its launch, the line has expanded beyond its initial offerings to include cleansers, toners, facial oils, eye treatments, and lip treatments. Sweet July Skin's award-winning products have received industry recognition from beauty publications and organizations, including the Oprah Daily Beauty O-wards, SELF Healthy Beauty Awards, Glossy Beauty & Wellness Awards, NewBeauty Awards, Essence Best in Black Beauty Awards and others.

== Personal life ==
On July 30, 2011, she married NBA player Stephen Curry. The two met in a church youth group in Charlotte when they were teenagers and began dating years later while Ayesha was pursuing acting in Hollywood and Stephen was visiting for an awards show. Ayesha soon moved back to Charlotte, close to where Stephen was playing college basketball at Davidson College. Together, they have two daughters, born in July 2012 and July 2015, and two sons, born in July 2018 and May 2024.

Curry is a Pentecostal Christian and has spoken publicly about the role of faith in her personal and professional life.

Curry is best friends with actress and singer Lindsay Lohan and is the godmother to Lohan's son, born in 2023. The two co-starred together in the 2024 Netflix film Irish Wish.

== Filmography ==
=== Film ===
Year	Title	Role	Notes
2008	Love for Sale	Girl #1	
2009	Underground Street Flippers	Trish	Short
2018	Charming	Fondue Woman (voice)	
2024	Irish Wish	Heather	
2025	Joy to the World	Liza	
2026	Goat	Carol the Whiskers Diner Manager (voice)	
2026	Second Chance Holiday	Chelsey	

=== Television ===
Year	Title	Role	Notes
2008	10 Items or Less	Girl in Bathroom	Episode: "Forever Young"
2008	Whittaker Bay	Keeley Hawkins	Main Cast
2009	Hannah Montana	Andrea	Episode: "Come Fail Away"
2009	Gary Unmarried	Tonya	Episode: "Gary Gives Sasha His Full Attention"
2010	Good Luck Charlie	Beautiful Girl	Episode: "Kwikki Chick"
2016	Chopped Junior	Herself/Judge	Episode "The Big Stink"
2016	Guy's Grocery Games	Herself/Judge	Guest Judge: Season 8-9 & 11
2016–17	Ayesha's Homemade	Herself/Host	Main Host
2017	Ballers	Herself	Episode: "Seeds of Expansion"
2017	The Great American Baking Show	Herself/Host	Main Host: Season 3
2017	The Real	Herself/Guest Co-Host	Episode: "Ayesha Curry/Common & Andra Day/Cell Phone Real-lette"
2018	Celebrity Family Feud	Herself/Contestant	Episode: "Steph Curry vs Chris Paul and Laurie Hernandez vs Shawn Johnson East"
2018	To Tell the Truth	Herself/Panelist	Episode: "Sherri Shepherd, Joshua Malina, Ryan Hansen, Ayesha Curry"
2018	The Talk	Herself/Guest Co-Host	Episode: "Ayesha Curry/Vivica A. Fox/Jaymes Vaughan"
2019	The $100,000 Pyramid	Herself/Celebrity Player	Episode: "Italia Ricci vs. Kal Penn and Ayesha Curry vs. Graham Elliot"
2019	Family Food Fight	Herself/Judge	Episode: "Meet the Families: Part 1"
2019	Stephen vs. The Game	Herself	Main Cast
2019	Fempire	Herself/Host	Main Host
2019	Homemade Unfiltered	Herself/Host	Main Host
2020	The Bold Type	Herself	Episode: "#Scarlet"
2021	A Black Lady Sketch Show	Amahra	Episode: "So You Just Out Here Chloroforming Anybody?"
2021	Say Yes to the Dress	Herself	Episode: "A Season of Surprises"
2021	Selena + Chef	Herself	Episode: "Selena + Ayesha Curry"
2022	About Last Night	Herself/Host	Main Host
2025	Court of Gold	Herself	Episode: "Episode #1.6"

=== Music Video ===
Year	Song	Artist	Role
2020	"Stuck with U"	Ariana Grande & Justin Bieber	Herself
