= Pati Chapoy =

Mexican TV host

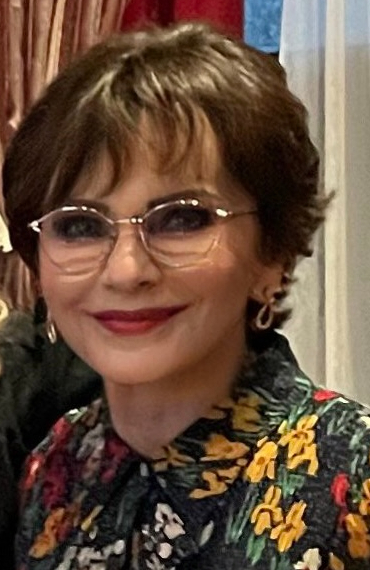
- Chapoy in 2024
- Born: Patricia Chapoy Acevedo; June 19, 1949 (age 77); Mexico City
- Occupation: Broadcast journalist
- Years active: 1980–
- Television: Ventaneando
- Spouse: Álvaro Dávila (m. 1977)
- Children: 2, including Rodrigo Dávila Chapoy

Patricia "Pati" Chapoy Acevedo (born June 19, 1949) is a Mexican entertainment journalist and TV host. She is the creator and host of the television entertainment news show Ventaneando by TV Azteca.
