= Family Food Fight (American TV series) =

- Genre: Cooking show; Reality competition
- Based on: Family Food Fight
- Directed by: Steve Hryniewicz
- Presented by: Ayesha Curry
- Judges: Ayesha Curry; Cat Cora; Graham Elliot
- Country of origin: United States
- Original language: English
- No. of seasons: 1
- No. of episodes: 8

Production
- Executive producers: Faye Stapleton; Ayesha Curry; Shab Azma; Robert Flutie; Sharon Levy; DJ Nurre; Georgie Hurford-Jones
- Production companies: Yardie Girl Productions; Endemol Shine North America

Original release
- Network: ABC
- Release: June 20 – August 15, 2019

Family Food Fight is an American cooking reality competition television series based on the Australian television series of the same name. The series is produced by Endemol Shine North America and Yardie Girl Productions, with Faye Stapleton, Ayesha Curry, Michael O'Sullivan, Shab Azma, Robert Flutie, Sharon Levy, DJ Nurre, and Georgie Hurford-Jones serving as executive producers. It premiered on ABC on June 20, 2019, and consisted of 8 episodes.

== Contestants ==
Family	Members	Relationship	Hometown	Status
Lenzi	EJ, Toni and Gabbie	Dad, mom and daughter	Chicago, Illinois	Eliminated 1st (June 20, 2019)
Min	Jason, Alex and Mike	Brothers	Chicago, Illinois	Eliminated 2nd (June 27, 2019)
Graves	DJ, Kris and Mike	Brothers	Santa Rosa, California	Eliminated 3rd (July 11, 2019)
Lee	Meily, Amanda and Victoria	Mom and daughters	San Francisco, California	Eliminated 4th (July 18, 2019)
White	Darlene, Shayla and Tan	Cousins	Texarkana, Arkansas	Eliminated 5th (August 1, 2019)
Livanos	Lorena, Enrico and Johnny	Mom and Sons	Armonk, New York	Eliminated 6th (August 8, 2019)
Nichols	Chris, Tammy and Eddie	Husband, wife and brother	Paulding County, Georgia	Runners-up (August 15, 2019)
Maniya	Azeema, Fatima and Kiran	Sisters-in-law	Chicago, Illinois	Winners (August 15, 2019)

== Elimination chart ==
Place	Family	Episodes							
Place	Family	1	2	3	4	5 (Note: In Episode 5, the remaining teams did not cook with their families, rather they cooked with their competitors, and they cooked alone in the elimination challenge, thus no one was eliminated.)	6	7	8
1	Maniya		WIN	WIN	SAFE	SAFE	WIN	WIN	WINNERS
2	Nichols		SAFE	WIN	WIN	SAFE	SAFE	SAFE	RUNNERS-UP
3	Livanos		SAFE	WIN	WIN	SAFE	SAFE	ELIM	
4	White	WIN		SAFE	SAFE	SAFE	ELIM		
5	Lee	SAFE		SAFE	ELIM				
6	Graves	SAFE		ELIM					
7	Min		ELIM						
8	Lenzi	ELIM							

The family won the competition.
The family finished as runner-up in the finals.
The family won the challenge and did not have to compete in the elimination round.
The family was safe from elimination.
The family was eliminated from the competition.
The family did not cook in this episode.

== Episodes ==
No.	Title	Original release date	U.S. viewers (millions)	Rating/share (18–49)
1	"Meet the Families: Part 1"	June 20, 2019	2.85	0.6/3
Challenge: The first four families are given two hours to cook a family feast of a minimum of 6 dishes with one of them having to be a dessert. The White family was the winner of the challenge, secured one of the three available kitchens, and was safe from elimination.; Challenge Winner/Immune: White family; Elimination Challenge: The remaining three families were tasked in making a Breakfast-for-Dinner of three dishes; two savory and one sweet, with one of the savory dishes needing to contain a hollandaise sauce, in 45 minutes. The Graves and Lee families were declared safe, leaving the Lenzi family eliminated.; Eliminated: Lenzi family
2	"Meet the Families: Part 2"	June 27, 2019	2.52	0.6/3
3	"Surf & Turf / Birthday Cake Challenge"	July 11, 2019	2.35	0.5/3
4	"Food on the Brain / How the Sausage is Made"	July 18, 2019	1.74	0.3/2
5	"Leftovers Challenge / Farm to Table"	July 25, 2019	1.87	0.4/2
6	"Game Day Grilling / Mission Im-PASTA-ble"	August 1, 2019	1.81	0.4/2
7	"Recipe Relay / What's on the Menu?"	August 8, 2019	1.36	0.3/2
8	"The Finale"	August 15, 2019	1.58	0.3/2

== Production ==
=== Development ===
In June 2018, ABC acquired the rights to the Australian cooking reality competition television series Family Food Fight and ordered 8 episodes. Cookbook author and food personality Ayesha Curry serves as both host and one of the judges, and executive produces alongside Robert Flutie, Shab Azma, DJ Nurre, Georgie Hurford-Jones, Faye Stapleton and Michael O'Sullivan. The series is produced by Endemol Shine North America and Yardie Girl Productions. It features eight American families facing off in high-pressure cooking challenges inspired by real home cooking and family food traditions to determine which is the country's top food family and win a grand prize of $100,000. Open casting calls were held in July in Los Angeles, California, and in August in Chicago, Illinois and New York, New York. Online video submissions were also accepted. In October 2018, Cat Cora and Graham Elliot were announced as judges alongside Curry.

=== Filming ===
Production began at the end of October in Los Angeles.
