= Inés Gómez Mont =

Mexican television host

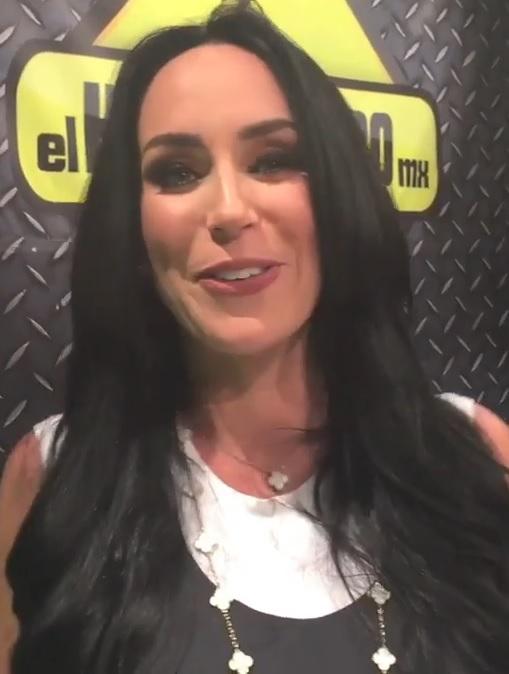
- Mont in 2015
- Born: Inés Gómez-Mont Arena; 29 July 1983 (age 43); Mexico City, Mexico
- Occupations: TV host and actress
- Years active: 1997–present
- Spouses: Javier Díaz (m. 2008; div. 2013); Victor Álvarez Puga (m. 2015)
- Children: 6
- Parent: Carmen Arena

Inés Gómez-Mont Arena (born 29 July 1983) is a Mexican television host, journalist and model. She was the host of TV Azteca's Los 25+ and co-host of Ventaneando.

== Career ==
Gómez-Mont first gained attention as an actress in 1997 with the telenovela Tric Trac. In 2002, she started working in the news production department of TV Azteca. She later joined the entertainment department, directed by Paty Chapoy. In 2004, she received the opportunity to host Los 25+. She later joined the team of Ventaneando in 2005 and also TV Azteca's sports reporters. Gomez Mont gained notoriety in the English speaking world when, at the Super Bowl Media Day for Super Bowl XLII, she attended a news conference with New England Patriots quarterback Tom Brady wearing a revealing wedding dress and pleaded with Brady to marry her.

== Personal life ==
She was married to Javier Díaz, with whom she have four children. They divorced in 2013. Since 2015, she is married to Víctor Álvarez and they have two other children.

=== Legal issues ===
Gomez Mont and Álvarez have been involved in a scandal involving "diversion of millions in public funds through fake contracts, money laundering, and tax evasion" since 2016. Interpol issued a Red Notice for them, which was withdrawn in September 2026.

Gomez Mont was arrested in Miami, Florida on October 30, 2026 by the FBI.
