= Diadem (disambiguation) =

A diadem is a type of crown.

Diadem may also refer to:

== Maritime ==
- HMS Diadem, several vessels of the Royal Navy
- Diadem (ship), several merchant vessels

== Arts and entertainment ==
- Diadem (board game), a 1981 science fiction game
- Diadem, a science fiction series by John Peel
- The Diadem Saga, a science fiction series by Jo Clayton
- "Diadems", a song by Megadeth on the soundtrack for the film Demon Knight (soundtrack)
- "Diadem", a tune used for the hymn "All Hail the Power of Jesus' Name"
- The Diadem, a 1969 short movie starring Diana Rigg

== Animals ==
- Diademed monkey
- Diadem roundleaf bat
- Mograbin diadem snake
- Diadem spider
- Diadems, the butterfly genus Hypolimnas
- Diadem (horse), a 20th-century Thoroughbred racehorse

== Other uses ==
- Diadem (star), a star in the constellation Coma Berenices
- Operation Diadem, a military operation in World War II's Italian Campaign
- Diadem Peak, a mountain in Alberta, Canada
- DIAdem, a technical software for managing, analyzing, and reporting technical data from National Instruments

== See also ==
- Diadema (disambiguation)
- Diiadem, a real housewife
