= Bake Off Brasil season 4 =

Bake Off Brasil
- Season 4
- Presented by: Nadja Haddad
- Judges: Beca Milano; Olivier Anquier
- No. of contestants: 16
- Winner: Ricardo
- Runner-up: Nayane
- No. of episodes: 18

Release
- Original network: SBT
- Original release: August 11 – December 15, 2018

Season chronology
- ← Previous; Season 3 Next → Season 5

The fourth season of Bake Off Brasil premiered on August 11, 2018 at 10:30 p.m. on SBT.

This season marks the debut of Nadja Haddad as the main host and Olivier Anquier as a judge, replacing Carol Fiorentino and Fabrizio Fasano Jr., who both left the show over contract disputes following production of the first season of Junior Bake Off.

== Bakers ==
The following is a list of contestants:

Baker	Age	Occupation	Hometown	Status	Star Baker	Finish
Thiago Ribeiro	39	Engineer	Piracicaba	Eliminated 1st	0	16th
Yuri Jaruskevicius	36	Conductor	São Paulo	Eliminated 2nd	0	15th
Paulo Malacaia	38	Administrator	Ribeirão Preto	Eliminated 3rd	0	14th
Edna Fonseca	51	Pharmaceutical	São Paulo	Eliminated 4th	0	13th
André Aquino	38	Professor	Taubaté	Eliminated 5th	0	—
Caroline Paiva	35	Calligrapher	Mossoró	Eliminated 6th	0	12th
Paola Francoti	27	Army official	São Paulo	Eliminated 7th	0	11th
Fatinha Costa-Brautau	57	Treasurer	São Paulo	Eliminated 8th	0	—
Núbia Moraes	37	Craftswoman	Rio de Janeiro	Eliminated 9th	3	—
Gislaine Ricci	34	Cantiniere	Mogi das Cruzes	Eliminated 10th	0	10th
André Aquino	38	Professor	Taubaté	Eliminated 11th	0	9th
Tathi Schroeder	36	Blogger	Ibirama	Eliminated 12th	1	8th
Flávio Ribeiro	39	Trade representative	São Paulo	Eliminated 13th	0	7th
Mina de Lyon	29	Drag queen	Curitiba	Eliminated 14th	2	6th
Fatinha Costa-Brautau	57	Treasurer	São Paulo	Eliminated 15th	0	5th
Lolla Ramos	33	Secretary	Salvador	Eliminated 16th	0	4th
Núbia Moraes	37	Craftswoman	Rio de Janeiro	Eliminated 17th	5	3rd
Nayane Capistrano	27	Stylist	Fortaleza	Runner-up	3	2nd
Ricardo Daudt	39	Realtor	Porto Alegre	Winner	5	1st

== Results summary ==
Elimination chart
Baker	1	2	3	4	5	6	7	8	9	10	11	12	13	14	15	16	17	18
Ricardo				SB									SB					WIN
Nayane		SB										SB					SB	OUT
Núbia			SB			SB			OUT	RET	SB					SB		OUT
Lolla																	OUT	
Fatinha								OUT		RET						OUT		
Mina								SB							OUT			
Flávio														OUT				
Tathi	SB												OUT					
André					OUT					RET		OUT						
Gislaine											OUT							
Paola							OUT											
Caroline						OUT												
Edna				OUT														
Paulo			OUT															
Yuri		OUT																
Thiago	OUT																	

Key
Advanced
Judges' favourite bakers
Star Baker
Eliminated
Judges' bottom bakers
Returned
Runner-up
Winner

=== Technical challenges ranking ===
Baker	1	2	3	4	5	6	7	8	9	10	11	12	13	14	15	16	17	18
Ricardo	5th	2nd	10th	1st	1st	4th	8th	1st	2nd		3rd	2nd	1st	1st	2nd	1st	3rd	1st
Nayane	9th	1st	13th	4th	9th	2nd	5th	9th	6th		1st	1st	8th	6th	6th	3rd	2nd	2nd
Núbia	6th	3rd	3rd	9th	4th	1st	1st	4th	8th	—	2nd	6th	2nd	3rd	3rd	1st	1st	3rd
Lolla	2nd	4th	2nd	10th	8th	9th	6th	3rd	5th		6th	4th	4th	4th	1st	2nd	4th	
Fatinha	11th	11th	11th	3rd	5th	7th	10th	7th		—	5th	3rd	5th	2nd	5th	4th		
Mina	14th	12th	1st	2nd	11th	11th	4th	5th	1st		7th	7th	3rd	5th	4th			
Flávio	4th	7th	9th	6th	2nd	3rd	2nd	6th	7th		9th	8th	6th	7th				
Tathi	3rd	5th	8th	13th	3rd	5th	3rd	2nd	4th		4th	5th	7th					
André	10th	14th	12th	5th	10th					1st	8th	8th						
Gislaine	1st	8th	4th	10th	12th	6th	7th	8th	3rd		10th							
Paola	13th	10th	6th	8th	7th	8th	9th			4th								
Caroline	12th	6th	7th	7th	6th	10th				2nd								
Edna	8th	13th	5th	12th						6th								
Paulo	7th	9th	14th							3rd								
Yuri	16th	15th								7th								
Thiago	15th									5th								

Key
Star Baker
Eliminated

== Ratings and reception ==
=== Brazilian ratings ===
All numbers are in points and provided by Kantar Ibope Media.

Episode	Title	Air date	Timeslot (BRT)	SP viewers (in points)	Source
1	Top 16	August 11, 2018	Saturday 10:30 p.m.	10.9	
2	Top 15	August 18, 2018	Saturday 10:30 p.m.	11.1	
3	Top 14	August 25, 2018	Saturday 10:30 p.m.	11.0	
4	Top 13	September 1, 2018	Saturday 10:30 p.m.	9.7	
5	Top 12	September 8, 2018	Saturday 10:30 p.m.	9.0	
6	Top 11	September 15, 2018	Saturday 10:30 p.m.	10.0	
7	Top 10	September 22, 2018	Saturday 10:30 p.m.	9.9	
8	Top 9	September 29, 2018	Saturday 10:30 p.m.	9.6	
9	Top 8	October 6, 2018	Saturday 10:30 p.m.	10.4	
10	Wildcard	October 13, 2018	Saturday 10:30 p.m.	10.1	
11	Top 10 Redux	October 20, 2018	Saturday 10:30 p.m.	10.3	
12	Top 9 Redux	October 27, 2018	Saturday 10:30 p.m.	10.3	
13	Top 8 Redux	November 3, 2018	Saturday 10:30 p.m.	10.5	
14	Top 7	November 17, 2018	Saturday 10:30 p.m.	10.7	
15	Top 6	November 24, 2018	Saturday 10:30 p.m.	10.4	
16	Top 5	December 1, 2018	Saturday 10:30 p.m.	11.0	
17	Top 4	December 8, 2018	Saturday 10:30 p.m.	10.2	
18	Winner announced	December 15, 2018	Saturday 10:30 p.m.	10.3	

- In 2018, each point represents 248.647 households in 15 market cities in Brazil (71.855 households in São Paulo).
