= Bake Off Brasil season 12 =

Bake Off Brasil
- Season 12
- Presented by: Nadja Haddad
- Judges: Beca Milano; Giuseppe Gerundino
- No. of contestants: 18
- No. of episodes: 19

Release
- Original network: SBT; HBO Max; Discovery Home & Health
- Original release: August 1, 2026

Season chronology
- ← Previous; Season 11

The twelfth season of Bake Off Brasil premiered on Saturday, August 1, 2026, at 9:00 p.m. on SBT, with episodes subsequently released weekly on HBO Max and Discovery Home & Health, beginning August 7, 2026.

The season features 18 amateur bakers competing in a series of creative and technical challenges. Nadja Haddad returned as host, while Beca Milano and Giuseppe Gerundino returned as judges.

== Bakers ==
The following is a list of contestants:

| Baker | Age | Occupation | Hometown | Status | Star Baker | Finish |
|---|---|---|---|---|---|---|
| Milena Moraes | 28 | Pedagogue | Teixeira de Freitas | Eliminated 1st | 0 | 18th |
| Priscila Cacilda | 27 | Salesperson | Curitiba | Eliminated 2nd | 0 | 17th |
| Ana Marta Galdino | 54 | Art teacher | Cajati | Eliminated 3rd | 0 | 16th |
| Paula Vitória | 25 | Sales consultant | Diadema | Eliminated 4th | 0 | 15th |
| Felipe Julião | 36 | Nursing assistant | São Paulo | Eliminated 5th | 0 | Returned |
| Bruna Andreatta | 31 | Nurse | Guarulhos | Eliminated 6th | 0 | 14th |
| Ana Paula Ribeiro | 41 | Businesswoman | Canapi | Eliminated 7th | 0 | 13th |
| Welington "Tom" Ramos | 44 | Choreographer | São Paulo | Eliminated 8th | 1 | 12th |
| João Eduardo | 25 | Businessman | Osasco | Eliminated 9th | 0 | Returned |
| Márcio Leandro | 32 | Pagode singer | Rio de Janeiro | Eliminated 10th | 0 | 11th |
| Felipe Julião | 36 | Nursing assistant | São Paulo | Eliminated 11th | 0 | 10th |
| Guilherme Antoni | 27 | Model | São Paulo | Eliminated 12th | 0 | 9th |
| Aylla Pedrinha | 31 | Production engineer | Vila Velha | Eliminated 13th | 0 | 8th |
| Victor Mariano | 25 | Businessman | São Paulo | Eliminated 14th | 1 | 7th |
| Amayra Ohana | 32 | Entrepreneur | Belém | | 2 | |
| Anderson Gomes | 25 | Visual artist | Teresina | | 3 | |
| João Eduardo | 25 | Businessman | Osasco | | 0 | |
| João Vitor Vasconcelos | 22 | Digital influencer | Taboão da Serra | | 2 | |
| Stefani Ferreira | 36 | Nursing auditor | São José dos Campos | | 1 | |
| Vinicius dos Santos | 30 | Waiter | Piritiba | | 3 | |

== Results summary ==
| Baker | 1 | 2 | 3 | 4 | 5 | 6 | 7 | 8 | 9 | 10 | 11 | 12 | 13 | 14 | 15 | 16 | 17 | 18 | 19 |
|---|---|---|---|---|---|---|---|---|---|---|---|---|---|---|---|---|---|---|---|
| Amayra | SB | LOW | HIGH | HIGH | SAFE | HIGH | SB | SAFE | SAFE | SAFE | | HIGH | LOW | HIGH | LOW | | | | |
| Anderson | SAFE | SAFE | SB | SB | SAFE | HIGH | SAFE | SAFE | HIGH | SAFE | | SAFE | SAFE | SB | SB | | | | |
| João | SAFE | LOW | SAFE | SAFE | LOW | SAFE | HIGH | LOW | OUT | | RET | SAFE | SAFE | LOW | HIGH | | | | |
| João Vitor | HIGH | SAFE | HIGH | SAFE | SAFE | SB | HIGH | SB | SAFE | SAFE | | SAFE | HIGH | HIGH | SAFE | | | | |
| Stefani | SAFE | SB | SAFE | SAFE | HIGH | SAFE | SAFE | SAFE | SAFE | HIGH | | HIGH | SAFE | SAFE | HIGH | | | | |
| Vinicius | SAFE | LOW | SAFE | SAFE | SAFE | SAFE | SAFE | HIGH | SB | SB | | LOW | SB | SAFE | LOW | | | | |
| Victor | SAFE | LOW | SAFE | SAFE | HIGH | SAFE | SAFE | HIGH | LOW | HIGH | | SB | SAFE | LOW | OUT | | | | |
| Aylla | SAFE | LOW | SAFE | SAFE | SAFE | SAFE | SAFE | SAFE | SAFE | SAFE | | LOW | HIGH | OUT | | | | | |
| Guilherme | HIGH | SAFE | SAFE | SAFE | SAFE | SAFE | LOW | LOW | SAFE | SAFE | | SAFE | OUT | | | | | | |
| Julião | SAFE | HIGH | SAFE | SAFE | OUT | | | | | | RET | OUT | | | | | | | |
| Marcio | SAFE | SAFE | SAFE | HIGH | LOW | LOW | SAFE | SAFE | HIGH | OUT | | | | | | | | | |
| Tom | SAFE | SAFE | SAFE | LOW | SB | SAFE | SAFE | OUT | | | | | | | | | | | |
| Ana Paula | SAFE | HIGH | SAFE | SAFE | SAFE | SAFE | OUT | | | | | | | | | | | | |
| Bruna | SAFE | SAFE | LOW | SAFE | SAFE | OUT | | | | | | | | | | | | | |
| Paula | SAFE | SAFE | LOW | OUT | | | | | | | | | | | | | | | |
| Ana Marta | LOW | SAFE | OUT | | | | | | | | | | | | | | | | |
| Cacilda | SAFE | OUT | | | | | | | | | | | | | | | | | |
| Milena | OUT | | | | | | | | | | | | | | | | | | |

Key

Winner
Runner-up

Star Baker
Judges' favourite bakers
Judges' bottom bakers
Eliminated
Returned

=== Technical challenges ranking ===
Elimination chart
| Baker | 1 | 2 | 3 | 4 | 5 | 6 | 7 | 8 | 9 | 10 | 11 | 12 | 13 | 14 | 15 | 16 | 17 | 18 | 19 |
|---|---|---|---|---|---|---|---|---|---|---|---|---|---|---|---|---|---|---|---|
| Amayra | 2nd | 17th | 3rd | 3rd | 7th | 3rd | 1st | 5th | 4th | 4th | | 3rd | 8th | 3rd | 5th | | | | |
| Anderson | 13th | 6th | 1st | 1st | 4th | 1st | 11th | 1st | 1st | 1st | | 8th | 9th | 1st | 1st | | | | |
| João | 5th | 17th | 7th | 4th | 5th | 8th | 2nd | 8th | 8th | | 3rd | 6th | 5th | 7th | 2nd | | | | |
| João Vitor | 3rd | 4th | 2nd | 8th | 12th | 2nd | 3rd | 2nd | 6th | 6th | | 4th | 1st | 2nd | 6th | | | | |
| Stefani | 12th | 2nd | 13th | 7th | 3rd | 6th | 4th | 7th | 10th | 2nd | | 2nd | 6th | 5th | 3rd | | | | |
| Vinicius | 15th | 17th | 9th | 6th | 8th | 9th | 6th | 3rd | 2nd | 3rd | | 10th | 2nd | 4th | 7th | | | | |
| Victor | 14th | 17th | 11th | 13th | 2nd | 5th | 9th | 4th | 7th | 5th | | 1st | 4th | 6th | 4th | | | | |
| Aylla | 10th | 12th | 4th | 12th | 11th | 13th | 8th | 6th | 9th | 7th | | 5th | 3rd | 8th | | | | | |
| Guilherme | 1st | 9th | 10th | 11th | 9th | 12th | 10th | 10th | 5th | 8th | | 7th | 7th | | | | | | |
| Julião | 6th | 1st | 5th | 5th | 14th | | | | | | 1st | 9th | | | | | | | |
| Marcio | 11th | 5th | 6th | 2nd | 10th | 7th | 5th | 9th | 3rd | 9th | 2nd | | | | | | | | |
| Tom | 16th | 7th | 12th | 15th | 1st | 10th | 7th | 11th | | | 6th | | | | | | | | |
| Ana Paula | 7th | 3rd | 8th | 9th | 13th | 4th | 12th | | | | 4th | | | | | | | | |
| Bruna | 8th | 10th | 15th | 10th | 6th | 11th | | | | | 5th | | | | | | | | |
| Paula | 4th | 11th | 14th | 14th | | | | | | | 9th | | | | | | | | |
| Ana Marta | 18th | 8th | 16th | | | | | | | | 10th | | | | | | | | |
| Cacilda | 9th | 17th | | | | | | | | | 8th | | | | | | | | |
| Milena | 17th | | | | | | | | | | 7th | | | | | | | | |

Key
Star Baker
Eliminated

== Ratings and reception ==
=== Brazilian ratings ===
All numbers are in points and provided by Kantar Ibope Media.

| Episode | Air date | Timeslot (BRT) | SP viewers (in points) | Source |
|---|---|---|---|---|
| 1 | August 1, 2026 | Saturday 9:00 p.m. | 2.3 | |
| 2 | August 8, 2026 | Saturday 9:00 p.m. | 2.8 | |
| 3 | August 15, 2026 | Saturday 9:00 p.m. | 3.3 | |
| 4 | August 22, 2026 | Saturday 9:00 p.m. | 3.1 | |
| 5 | August 29, 2026 | Saturday 9:00 p.m. | 2.9 | |
| 6 | September 5, 2026 | Saturday 9:00 p.m. | 3.1 | |
| 7 | September 12, 2026 | Saturday 9:00 p.m. | 3.0 | |
| 8 | September 19, 2026 | Saturday 9:00 p.m. | 3.3 | |
| 9 | September 26, 2026 | Saturday 9:00 p.m. | 2.5 | |
| 10 | October 3, 2026 | Saturday 9:00 p.m. | 2.7 | |
| 11 | October 10, 2026 | Saturday 9:00 p.m. | 2.6 | |
| 12 | October 17, 2026 | Saturday 9:00 p.m. | 2.1 | |
| 13 | October 24, 2026 | Saturday 9:00 p.m. | 2.2 | |
| 14 | October 31, 2026 | Saturday 9:00 p.m. | 2.6 | |
| 15 | November 14, 2026 | Saturday 9:00 p.m. | | |
| 16 | November 21, 2026 | Saturday 9:00 p.m. | | |
| 17 | November 28, 2026 | Saturday 9:00 p.m. | | |
| 18 | December 5, 2026 | Saturday 9:00 p.m. | | |
| 19 | November 12, 2026 | Saturday 9:00 p.m. | | |

- In 2026, each point represents 277.669 households in 15 market cities in Brazil (78.780 households in São Paulo).
