= Bake Off SBT =

- Genre: Cooking; Baking; Reality
- Presented by: Nadja Haddad; Carol Fiorentino
- Judges: Beca Milano; Olivier Anquier; Fabrizio Fasano Jr.
- Country of origin: Brazil
- No. of seasons: 3
- No. of episodes: 6

Production
- Production locations: São Paulo, São Paulo
- Camera setup: Multiple-camera
- Running time: 120 minutes

Original release
- Network: SBT
- Release: 23 December 2017 – 28 December 2019

Related
- Bake Off Brasil; Junior Bake Off; Bake Off Celebridades

Bake Off SBT is a Brazilian holiday–themed celebrity reality television competition spin-off from the main series Bake Off Brasil.

The series premiered on Saturday, 23 December 2017, at 9:30 p.m. (BRT / AMT) on SBT, aiming to find the best amateur celebrity baker from SBT.

== Host and judges ==
Key
Host
Judge

Cast member	Seasons		
Cast member	1	2	3
Carol Fiorentino			
Nadja Haddad			
Fabrizio Fasano Jr.			
Beca Milano			
Olivier Anquier			

== Series overview ==
Season	No. of bakers	No. of weeks	Winner	Runner-up
1	16	2	Isabella Fiorentino	Nadja Haddad
2	16	2	Patricia Abravanel	Carla Fioroni
3	16	2	Junior Mendes	Lucas Anderi

== Season 1 (2017) ==
Fashion consultant Isabella Fiorentino won the competition with Nadja Haddad as the runner-up and Lívia Andrade finishing in third place.

Celebrity	Age	Occupation	Hometown	Status	Finish
Bia Arantes	24	Actress	Piumhi	Eliminated 1st	16th 15th 14th 13th
Gabriel Santana	18	Actor	Rio de Janeiro	Eliminated 1st	16th 15th 14th 13th
João Guilherme Ávila	15	Actor & singer	São Paulo	Eliminated 1st	16th 15th 14th 13th
Milene Pavorô	37	Stage assistant	Campinas	Eliminated 1st	16th 15th 14th 13th
Arlindo Grund	43	Fashion consultant	Recife	Eliminated 2nd	12th 11th 10th 9th
Cassius Zeilman	29	Journalist	Porto Alegre	Eliminated 2nd	12th 11th 10th 9th
Larissa Manoela	16	Actress & singer	Guarapuava	Eliminated 2nd	12th 11th 10th 9th
Valentina Francavilla	37	Stage assistant	Rome, Italy	Eliminated 2nd	12th 11th 10th 9th
Carlo Porto	36	Actor	Governador Valadares	Eliminated 3rd	8th 7th 6th
Jean Paulo Campos	14	Actor	São Paulo	Eliminated 3rd	8th 7th 6th
Karyn Bravo	36	Journalist	São Paulo	Eliminated 3rd	8th 7th 6th
Matheus Ceará	33	Comedian	Fortaleza	Eliminated 4th	5th
Chris Flores	40	TV host	São Paulo	Eliminated 5th	4th
Lívia Andrade	34	TV host	São Paulo	Eliminated 6th	3rd
Nadja Haddad	36	Journalist	Nova Iguaçu	Runner-up	2nd
Isabella Fiorentino	40	Fashion consultant	São Paulo	Winner	1st

=== Results summary ===
Elimination chart
Baker	1		2	
Isabella				WIN
Nadja		SB		OUT
Lívia	SB			OUT
Chris				OUT
Matheus				OUT
Carlo			OUT	
Jean			OUT	
Karyn			OUT	
Arlindo		OUT		
Cassius		OUT		
Larissa		OUT		
Valentina		OUT		
Bia	OUT			
Gabriel	OUT			
João	OUT			
Milene	OUT			

Ranking (by challenge)
Baker	1		2	
Isabella	3rd	8th	3rd	1st
Nadja	2nd	1st	1st	2nd
Lívia	1st	7th	5th	3rd
Chris	7th	2nd	2nd	4th
Matheus	8th	3rd	4th	5th
Carlo	5th	4th	6th 7th 8th	
Jean	4th	5th	6th 7th 8th	
Karyn	11th	5th	6th 7th 8th	
Arlindo	10th	9th 10th 11th 12th		
Cassius	12th	9th 10th 11th 12th		
Larissa	6th	9th 10th 11th 12th		
Valentina	9th	9th 10th 11th 12th		
Bia	13th 14th 15th 16th			
Gabriel	13th 14th 15th 16th			
João	13th 14th 15th 16th			
Milene	13th 14th 15th 16th			

Key
Advanced
Judges' favourite bakers
Star Baker
Eliminated
Judges' bottom bakers
Runner-up
Winner

== Season 2 (2018) ==
TV host Patricia Abravanel won the competition with Carla Fioroni as the runner-up and João Fernandes finishing in third place.

Celebrity	Age	Occupation	Hometown	Status	Finish
Apollo Costa	21	Actor	João Pessoa	Eliminated 1st	16th 15th 14th 13th
Igor Jansen	14	Actor	Fortaleza	Eliminated 1st	16th 15th 14th 13th
Mara Maravilha	50	TV host	Itapetinga	Eliminated 1st	16th 15th 14th 13th
Raissa Chaddad	16	Actress	Guarujá	Eliminated 1st	16th 15th 14th 13th
Dudu Camargo	20	TV host	São Paulo	Eliminated 2nd	12th 11th 10th 9th
Eliana	45	TV host	São Paulo	Eliminated 2nd	12th 11th 10th 9th
Graciely Junqueira	18	Actress	Serra	Eliminated 2nd	12th 11th 10th 9th
Otávio Mesquita	59	TV host	Guarulhos	Eliminated 2nd	12th 11th 10th 9th
Celso Portiolli	51	TV host	Maringá	Eliminated 3rd	8th 7th 6th
Sophia Valverde	13	Actress	Curitiba	Eliminated 3rd	8th 7th 6th
Victor Pecoraro	40	Actor	São Caetano do Sul	Eliminated 3rd	8th 7th 6th
Murilo Cézar	32	Actor	Piumhi	Eliminated 4th	5th
Silvia Abravanel	47	TV host	São Paulo	Eliminated 5th	4th
João Fernandes	39	TV host	Ribeirão Preto	Eliminated 6th	3rd
Carla Fioroni	48	Actress	São Paulo	Runner-up	2nd
Patricia Abravanel	41	TV host	São Paulo	Winner	1st

=== Results summary ===
Elimination chart
Baker	1		2	
Patricia				WIN
Carla	SB			OUT
João			SB	OUT
Silvia		SB		OUT
Murilo				OUT
Celso			OUT	
Sophia			OUT	
Victor			OUT	
Dudu		OUT		
Eliana		OUT		
Graciely		OUT		
Otávio		OUT		
Apollo	OUT			
Igor	OUT			
Mara	OUT			
Raissa	OUT			

Ranking (by challenge)
Baker	1		2	
Patricia	6th	4th	3rd	1st
Carla	1st	6th	4th	2nd
João	3rd	5th	1st	3rd
Silvia	7th	1st	5th	4th
Murilo	4th	7th	2nd	5th
Celso	9th	3rd	6th 7th 8th	
Sophia	11th	8th	6th 7th 8th	
Victor	12th	2nd	6th 7th 8th	
Dudu	10th	9th 10th 11th 12th		
Eliana	8th	9th 10th 11th 12th		
Graciely	2nd	9th 10th 11th 12th		
Otávio	5th	9th 10th 11th 12th		
Apollo	13th 14th 15th 16th			
Igor	13th 14th 15th 16th			
Mara	13th 14th 15th 16th			
Raissa	13th 14th 15th 16th			

Key
Advanced
Judges' favourite bakers
Star Baker
Eliminated
Judges' bottom bakers
Runner-up
Winner

== Season 3 (2019) ==
Makeup artist Junior Mendes won the competition with Lucas Anderi as the runner-up and Isabella Fiorentino finishing in third place.

It featured six returning contestants: Arlindo Grund, Isabella Fiorentino, Lívia Andrade and Matheus Ceará (from season 1); Otávio Mesquita and Sophia Valverde (from season 2).

Celebrity	Age	Occupation	Hometown	Status	Finish
Arlindo Grund	46	Fashion consultant	Recife	Eliminated 1st	16th 15th 14th 13th
Carlos Nascimento	65	Journalist	Dois Córregos	Eliminated 1st	16th 15th 14th 13th
Juliana Oliveira	33	Stage assistant	Araçariguama	Eliminated 1st	16th 15th 14th 13th
Oscar Filho	41	Comedian	Atibaia	Eliminated 1st	16th 15th 14th 13th
Rachel Sheherazade	46	Journalist	João Pessoa	Eliminated 2nd	12th 11th 10th 9th
Sophia Valverde	14	Actress	Curitiba	Eliminated 2nd	12th 11th 10th 9th
Thaís Melchior	29	Actress	Rio de Janeiro	Eliminated 2nd	12th 11th 10th 9th
Tiago Abravanel	32	Actor & TV host	São Paulo	Eliminated 2nd	12th 11th 10th 9th
Flavia Pavanelli	21	Digital influencer	Arujá	Eliminated 3rd	8th 7th
Matheus Ceará	35	Comedian	Fortaleza	Eliminated 3rd	8th 7th
Lívia Andrade	36	TV host & actress	São Paulo	Eliminated 4th	6th
Maisa Silva	17	TV host & actress	São Bernardo	Eliminated 5th	5th
Otávio Mesquita	60	TV host	Guarulhos	Eliminated 6th	4th
Isabella Fiorentino	42	Fashion consultant	São Paulo	Eliminated 7th	3rd
Lucas Anderi	41	Stylist	Jounieh, Lebanon	Runner-up	2nd
Junior Mendes	41	Makeup artist	Sousa	Winner	1st

=== Results summary ===
Elimination chart
Baker	1		2	
Junior				WIN
Lucas	SB			OUT
Isabella			SB	OUT
Otávio				OUT
Maisa				OUT
Lívia				OUT
Flávia			OUT	
Matheus			OUT	
Rachel		OUT		
Sophia		OUT		
Thaís		OUT		
Tiago		OUT		
Arlindo	OUT			
Carlos	OUT			
Juliana	OUT			
Oscar	OUT			

Ranking (by challenge)
Baker	1		2	
Junior	2nd	4th	2nd	1st
Lucas	1st	1st	3rd	2nd
Isabella	12th	2nd	1st	3rd
Otávio	8th	8th	6th	4th
Maisa	10th	7th	5th	5th
Lívia	5th	6th	4th	6th
Flávia	6th	3rd	7th 8th	
Matheus	9th	5th	7th 8th	
Rachel	7th	9th 10th 11th 12th		
Sophia	3rd	9th 10th 11th 12th		
Thaís	11th	9th 10th 11th 12th		
Tiago	4th	9th 10th 11th 12th		
Arlindo	13th 14th 15th 16th			
Carlos	13th 14th 15th 16th			
Juliana	13th 14th 15th 16th			
Oscar	13th 14th 15th 16th			

Key
Advanced
Judges' favourite bakers
Star Baker
Eliminated
Judges' bottom bakers
Runner-up
Winner

== Ratings and reception ==
=== Brazilian ratings ===
All numbers are in points and provided by Kantar Ibope Media.

No. in series	No. in season	Title	Air date	Timeslot (BRT	SP viewers (in points)	BR viewers (in points)	Source
1	1	Christmas special Top 16; Top 12	Saturday 9:30 p.m.	23 December 2017	7.8	7.5	
2	2	New Year special Top 8 Winner announced	Saturday 9:30 p.m.	30 December 2017	8.1	7.3	
3	1	Christmas special Top 16; Top 12	Saturday 10:30 p.m.	22 December 2018	11.2	9.0	
4	2	New Year special Top 8 Winner announced	Saturday 10:30 p.m.	29 December 2018	12.0	9.7	
5	1	Christmas special Top 16; Top 12	Saturday 10:30 p.m.	21 December 2019	9.6	7.7	
6	2	New Year special Top 8 Winner announced	Saturday 10:30 p.m.	28 December 2019	8.9	8.2	

- In 2017, each point represents 245.700 households in 15 market cities in Brazil (70.500 households in São Paulo).
- In 2018, each point represents 248.647 households in 15 market cities in Brazil (71.855 households in São Paulo).
- In 2019, each point represents 254.892 households in 15 market cities in Brazil (73.015 households in São Paulo).
