= Bake Off Brasil season 5 =

Bake Off Brasil
- Season 5
- Presented by: Nadja Haddad
- Judges: Beca Milano; Olivier Anquier
- No. of contestants: 16
- Winner: Karoline
- Runner-up: Francisco
- No. of episodes: 18

Release
- Original network: SBT
- Original release: August 10 – December 14, 2019

Season chronology
- ← Previous; Season 4 Next → Season 6

The fifth season of Bake Off Brasil premiered on August 10, 2019 at 10:30 p.m. on SBT.

== Bakers ==
The following is a list of contestants:

Baker	Age	Occupation	Hometown	Status	Star Baker	Finish
Marilda Caires	56	Businesswoman	Montes Claros	Eliminated 1st	0	16th
Rogério Bone	27	Trader	Serranópolis	Eliminated 2nd	0	15th
Denise Galviolli	29	Bachelor in Law	Mirassol	Eliminated 3rd	0	14th
Deza Correia	32	Telemarketing supervisor	Jaguariúna	Eliminated 4th	0	13th
Natália Kaufmann	29	Saleswoman	Petrópolis	Eliminated 5th	0	—
Fellipe Xenofonte	28	Advertiser	Fortaleza	Eliminated 6th	0	—
João Silveira	22	Artist	Florianópolis	Withdrew	0	—
Claudio Graças	43	Former police officer	São Paulo	Eliminated 7th	1	—
Angel Prado	40	Volunteer clown	São Paulo	Eliminated 8th	0	12th
Carol Teixeira	24	Businesswoman	Pindamonhangaba	Eliminated 9th	1	—
Fellipe Xenofonte	28	Advertiser	Fortaleza	Eliminated 10th	0	11th
Carol Teixeira	24	Businesswoman	Pindamonhangaba	Eliminated 11th	1	10th
Claudio Graças	43	Former police officer	São Paulo	Eliminated 12th	1	9th
Herb D'Melo	28	Computer technician	Primavera	Eliminated 13th	0	8th
Natália Kaufmann	29	Saleswoman	Petrópolis	Eliminated 14th	1	7th
Yago Corrêa	23	Coffee shop attendant	Mongaguá	Eliminated 15th	2	6th
Wayner Lyra	34	Tarologist	Manaus	Eliminated 16th	0	5th
Bela Castro	25	Graphic designer	Campinas	Eliminated 17th	3	4th
João Silveira	22	Artist	Florianópolis	Eliminated 18th	1	3rd
João Francisco	27	Cooker	Capão Bonito	Runner-up	6	2nd
Karoline Barbeirotti	29	Judoka	Guarujá	Winner	1	1st

== Results summary ==
Elimination chart
Baker	1	2	3	4	5	6	7	8	9	10	11	12	13	14	15	16	17	18
Karoline																	SB	WIN
Francisco	SB		SB						SB						SB			OUT
João							WD			RET	SB							OUT
Bela		SB										SB		SB			OUT	
Wayner																OUT		
Yago							SB								OUT			
Natália					OUT					RET			SB	OUT				
Herb													OUT					
Claudio						SB	OUT			RET		OUT						
Carol					SB				OUT	RET	OUT							
Fellipe						OUT				RET	OUT							
Angel								OUT										
Deza				OUT														
Denise			OUT															
Rogério		OUT																
Marilda	OUT																	

Key
Advanced
Judges' favourite bakers
Star Baker
Withdrew
Eliminated
Judges' bottom bakers
Returned
Runner-up
Winner

=== Technical challenges ranking ===
Baker	1	2	3	4	5	6	7	8	9	10	11	12	13	14	15	16	17	18
Karoline	4th	2nd	6th	5th	6th	2nd	6th	3rd	6th		3rd	7th	6th	4th	4th	5th	1st	2nd
Francisco	2nd	1st	1st	1st	2nd	4th	3rd	1st	3rd		6th	1st	2nd	2nd	2nd	2nd	3rd	1st
João	9th	6th	4th	10th	9th	9th	—			1st	5th	6th	5th	7th	3rd	1st	4th	3rd
Bela	10th	3rd	2nd	1st	3rd	8th	5th	4th	5th		9th	2nd	3rd	1st	1st	4th	2nd	
Wayner	6th	12th	12th	9th	7th	7th	9th	8th	7th		8th	3rd	8th	3rd	5th	3rd		
Yago	14th	5th	10th	3rd	10th	3rd	1st	2nd	2nd		2nd	4th	4th	6th	6th			
Natália	12th	7th	5th	7th	8th					—	4th	5th	1st	5th				
Herb	16th	11th	9th	11th	5th	5th	8th	7th	1st		1st	9th	7th					
Claudio	5th	8th	7th	8th	4th	1st	7th			3rd	7th	8th						
Carol	1st	4th	3rd	6th	1st	10th	2nd	5th	4th	2nd	10th							
Fellipe	3rd	9th	11th	12th	11th	11th				—	11th							
Angel	12th	10th	13th	4th	12th	6th	4th	6th		4th								
Deza	8th	14th	8th	13th						5th								
Denise	13th	13th	14th							8th								
Rogério	7th	15th								7th								
Marilda	15th									6th								

Key
Star Baker
Eliminated

== Ratings and reception ==
=== Brazilian ratings ===
All numbers are in points and provided by Kantar Ibope Media.

Episode	Title	Air date	Timeslot (BRT)	SP viewers (in points)	Source
1	Top 16	August 10, 2019	Saturday 10:30 p.m.	9.7	
2	Top 15	August 17, 2019	Saturday 10:30 p.m.	9.4	
3	Top 14	August 24, 2019	Saturday 10:30 p.m.	9.8	
4	Top 13	August 31, 2019	Saturday 10:30 p.m.	9.8	
5	Top 12	September 7, 2019	Saturday 10:30 p.m.	8.9	
6	Top 11	September 14, 2019	Saturday 10:30 p.m.	10.0	
7	Top 10	September 21, 2019	Saturday 10:30 p.m.	8.3	
8	Top 8	September 28, 2019	Saturday 10:30 p.m.	9.1	
9	Top 7	October 5, 2019	Saturday 10:30 p.m.	8.5	
10	Wildcard	October 12, 2019	Saturday 10:30 p.m.	8.5	
11	Top 11 Redux	October 19, 2019	Saturday 10:30 p.m.	9.6	
12	Top 9 Redux	November 2, 2019	Saturday 10:30 p.m.	9.3	
13	Top 8 Redux	November 9, 2019	Saturday 10:30 p.m.	8.8	
14	Top 7 Redux	November 16, 2019	Saturday 10:30 p.m.	6.9	
15	Top 6	November 23, 2019	Saturday 10:30 p.m.	7.6	
16	Top 5	November 30, 2019	Saturday 10:30 p.m.	8.8	
17	Top 4	December 7, 2019	Saturday 10:30 p.m.	8.2	
18	Winner announced	December 14, 2019	Saturday 10:30 p.m.	9.6	

- In 2019, each point represents 254.892 households in 15 market cities in Brazil (73.015 households in São Paulo).
