= Junior Bake Off Brasil season 2 =

Junior Bake Off Brasil
- Season 2
- Presented by: Nadja Haddad
- Judges: Beca Milano; Olivier Anquier
- No. of contestants: 12
- Winner: Gigi
- Runner-up: Fred
- No. of episodes: 7

Release
- Original network: SBT
- Original release: February 16 – March 30, 2019

Season chronology
- ← Previous; Season 1 Next → Season 3

The second season of Junior Bake Off Brasil premiered on February 16, 2019 at 10:30 p.m. on SBT.

This season marks the debut of Nadja Haddad as the main host and Olivier Anquier as a judge, replacing Carol Fiorentino and Fabrizio Fasano Jr., who both left the show over contract disputes following production of the first season.

== Bakers ==
The following is a list of contestants:

Baker	Age	Hometown	Status	Finish
Pietro Steganha	8	Campinas	Eliminated 1st	12th 11th
Sophia Meneguete	8	Atibaia	Eliminated 1st	12th 11th
Catarina Queiroz	10	Jundiaí	Eliminated 2nd	10th
Rafaella Pereira	9	Santana de Parnaíba	Eliminated 2nd	—
Pedro "Pedrinho" Lucas	7	São Paulo	Eliminated 3rd	9th 8th
Sara Gomes	9	Campinas	Eliminated 3rd	9th 8th
Manoela Hadba	8	São Paulo	Eliminated 4th	—
Yasmin Soares	10	Limão	Eliminated 4th	—
Rafaella Pereira	9	Santana de Parnaíba	Eliminated 5th	7th 6th
Yasmin Soares	10	Limão	Eliminated 5th	7th 6th
Manoela Hadba	8	São Paulo	Eliminated 6th	5th
Enzo Silveira	10	São Paulo	Eliminated 7th	4th
Gian Lucca Placeres	12	São Paulo	Eliminated 8th	3rd
Fred Francavilla	11	São Paulo	Runner-up	2nd
Giovanna "Gigi" Bordezan	8	São Paulo	Winner	1st

== Results summary ==
Elimination chart
Baker	1	2	3	4	5	6	7
Gigi	SB						WIN
Fred			SB			SB	OUT
Gian Lucca							OUT
Enzo							OUT
Manoela				OUT	RET		OUT
Rafaella		OUT			RET	OUT	
Yasmin				OUT	RET	OUT	
Pedrinho			OUT				
Sara			OUT				
Catarina		OUT					
Pietro	OUT						
Sophia	OUT						

Key
Advanced
Judges' favourite bakers
Star Baker
Eliminated
Judges' bottom bakers
Returned
Runner-up
Winner

=== Technical challenges ranking ===
Baker	1	2	3	4	5	6	7
Gigi	1st	1st	1st	1st		6th	2nd
Fred	7th	3rd	2nd	2nd		1st	1st
Gian Lucca	6th	2nd	8th	4th		3rd	3rd
Enzo	2nd	9th	3rd	3rd		2nd	4th
Manoela	8th	7th	4th	6h	1st	4th	5th
Rafaella	10th	8th			2nd	5th	
Yasmin	4th	4th	5th	5th	—	7th	
Pedrinho	3rd	6th	6th		4th		
Sara	5th	1st	7th		5th		
Catarina	9th	5th			3rd		
Pietro	12th				6th		
Sophia	11th				7th		

Key
Star Baker
Eliminated

== Ratings and reception ==
=== Brazilian ratings ===
All numbers are in points and provided by Kantar Ibope Media.

Episode	Title	Air date	Timeslot (BRT)	SP viewers (in points)	Source
1	Top 12	February 17, 2019	Saturday 10:30 p.m.	9.9	
2	Top 10	February 24, 2019	Saturday 10:30 p.m.	9.4	
3	Top 8	March 3, 2019	Saturday 10:30 p.m.	8.1	
4	Top 6	March 10, 2019	Saturday 10:30 p.m.	8.8	
5	Wildcard	March 16, 2019	Saturday 10:30 p.m.	10.2	
6	Top 7 Redux	March 23, 2019	Saturday 10:30 p.m.	9.1	
7	Winner announced	March 30, 2019	Saturday 10:30 p.m.	9.7	

- In 2019, each point represents 254.892 households in 15 market cities in Brazil (73.015 households in São Paulo).
