= Bake Off Brasil season 7 =

Bake Off Brasil
- Season 7
- Presented by: Nadja Haddad
- Judges: Beca Milano; Olivier Anquier
- No. of contestants: 18
- Winner: Gileade
- Runner-up: Nathanael
- No. of episodes: 21

Release
- Original network: SBT; Discovery Home & Health
- Original release: July 24 – December 18, 2021

Season chronology
- ← Previous; Season 6 Next → Season 8

The seventh season of Bake Off Brasil premiered on July 24, 2021, at 10:30 p.m. on SBT.

== Bakers ==
The following is a list of contestants:

Baker	Age	Occupation	Hometown	Status	Star Baker	Finish
Luís Moutinho	32	Massage therapist	Pelotas	Eliminated 1st	0	Returned
Albaniza Itajacy	73	Retired	Macapá	Eliminated 2nd	0	18th
Toska Torres	30	Translator	Caracas, Venezuela	Eliminated 3rd	0	17th
Ana Klara Gomes	20	English teacher	Teresina	Eliminated 4th	0	16th
Caroline Baessi	25	Photographer	Taboão da Serra	Eliminated 5th	0	15th
Flavia Soares	29	Student	Jaboatão	Eliminated 6th	0	14th
Giovanna Reis	57	Retired	Guarulhos	Eliminated 7th	0	13th
Nathanael Santos	26	Salesman	Maceió	Withdrew	1	Returned
Vanessa Guaitolini	42	Realtor	Fundão	Eliminated 8th	0	12th
Mazinho Filho	32	Fashion consultant	São Paulo	Eliminated 9th	0	11th
Gileade Santana	35	Construction master	São Paulo	Eliminated 10th	0	Returned
Julio Cepe	20	Digital influencer	Londrina	Eliminated 11th	1	Returned
Caique Beraldo	34	Graphic designer	São Paulo	Eliminated 12th	0	Returned
Luís Moutinho	32	Massage therapist	Pelotas	Eliminated 13th	0	10th
Caique Beraldo	34	Graphic designer	São Paulo	Eliminated 14th	0	9th
Jonathas Almeida	34	Advertiser	Brasília	Eliminated 15th	1	8th
Ananda Vasconcelos	27	Journalist	São Paulo	Eliminated 16th	1	7th
Willian Mendes	36	Flight attendant	Guarulhos	Eliminated 17th	4	6th
Felipe Ferrara	21	Coach	Rio de Janeiro	Eliminated 18th	6	5th
Mariana Baraboldi	29	Bartender	São Paulo	Eliminated 19th	1	4th
Julio Cepe	20	Digital influencer	Londrina	Eliminated 20th	3	3rd
Nathanael Santos†	26	Salesman	Maceió	Runner-up	2	2nd
Gileade Santana	35	Construction master	São Paulo	Winner	0	1st

== Results summary ==
Elimination chart
Baker	1	2	3	4	5	6	7	8	9	10	11	12	13	14	15	16	17	18	19	20	21
Gileade										OUT			RET								WIN
Nathanael	SB							WD					RET						SB		OUT
Julio		SB									OUT		RET			SB		SB			OUT
Mariana				SB																OUT	
Felipe					SB					SB		SB							OUT		
Willian			SB											SB			SB	OUT			
Ananda									SB								OUT				
Jonathas											SB					OUT					
Caique												OUT	RET		OUT						
Luís	OUT												RET	OUT							
Mazinho									OUT												
Vanessa								OUT													
Giovanna							OUT														
Flavia						OUT															
Caroline					OUT																
Ana Klara				OUT																	
Toska			OUT																		
Albaniza		OUT																			

Key

Winner
Runner-up

Star Baker
Judges' favourite bakers
Advanced
Judges' bottom bakers
Eliminated
Returned

=== Technical challenges ranking ===
Baker	1	2	3	4	5	6	7	8	9	10	11	12	13	14	15	16	17	18	19	20	21
Gileade	15th	15th	13th	1st	10th	5th	10th	8th	8th	8th			—	4th	3rd	8th	6th	6th	4th	3rd	1st
Nathanael	2nd	8th	3rd	6th	4th	8th	5th	—					—	2nd	8th	3rd	2nd	2nd	2nd	2nd	2nd
Julio	3rd	1st	1st	5th	2nd	3rd	2nd	4th	3rd	6th	6th		1st	3rd	1st	2nd	4th	1st	3rd	1st	3rd
Mariana	1st	2nd	14th	2nd	3rd	4th	3rd	3rd	5th	4th	1st	3rd		8th	6th	1st	3rd	3rd	1st	4th	
Felipe	5th	9th	11th	11th	1st	1st	1st	1st	2nd	3rd	3rd	1st		6th	4th	5th	5th	4th	5th		
Willian	11th	7th	2nd	13th	5th	7th	8th	7th	6th	1st	7th	4th		1st	2nd	6th	1st	5th			
Ananda	10th	14th	15th	9th	8th	2nd	6th	6th	1st	2nd	4th	2nd		9th	5th	4th	7th				
Jonathas	6th	13th	4th	3rd	7th	12th	7th	5th	7th	5th	2nd	5th		5th	7th	7th					
Caique	7th	6th	6th	8th	6th	6th	9th	9th	4th	7th	5th	6th	4th	7th	9th						
Luís	18th												2nd	10th							
Mazinho	8th	11th	12th	4th	13th	9th	4th	2nd	9th				6th								
Vanessa	17th	10th	7th	12th	12th	10th	12th	10th					3rd								
Giovanna	9th	16th	9th	7th	11th	12th	11th						8th								
Flavia	13th	12th	5th	10th	9th	11th							7th								
Caroline	12th	4th	8th	14th	14th								5th								
Ana Klara	14th	3rd	10th	15th									10th								
Toska	4th	5th	16th										11th								
Albaniza	16th	17th											9th								

== Ratings and reception ==
=== Brazilian ratings ===
All numbers are in points and provided by Kantar Ibope Media.

Episode	Air date	Timeslot (BRT)	SP viewers (in points)	Source
1	July 24, 2021	Saturday 10:30 p.m.	5.8	
2	July 31, 2021	Saturday 10:30 p.m.	4.7	
3	August 7, 2021	Saturday 10:30 p.m.	5.1	
4	August 14, 2021	Saturday 10:30 p.m.	5.1	
5	August 21, 2021	Saturday 10:30 p.m.	5.5	
6	August 28, 2021	Saturday 10:30 p.m.	5.4	
7	September 4, 2021	Saturday 10:30 p.m.	5.5	
8	September 11, 2021	Saturday 10:30 p.m.	5.0	
9	September 18, 2021	Saturday 10:30 p.m.	4.7	
10	September 25, 2021	Saturday 10:30 p.m.	4.1	
11	October 2, 2021	Saturday 10:30 p.m.	5.3	
12	October 9, 2021	Saturday 10:30 p.m.	5.3	
13	October 16, 2021	Saturday 10:30 p.m.	5.8	
14	October 30, 2021	Saturday 10:30 p.m.	4.6	
15	November 6, 2021	Saturday 10:30 p.m.	4.0	
16	November 13, 2021	Saturday 10:30 p.m.	5.0	
17	November 20, 2021	Saturday 10:30 p.m.	5.4	
18	November 27, 2021	Saturday 10:30 p.m.	6.1	
19	December 4, 2021	Saturday 10:30 p.m.	5.9	
20	December 11, 2021	Saturday 10:30 p.m.	5.3	
21	December 18, 2021	Saturday 10:30 p.m.	5.6	

- In 2021, each point represents 268.278 households in 15 market cities in Brazil (76.577 households in São Paulo).
