= Bake Off Brasil season 1 =

Brazilian TV séries

Bake Off Brasil
- Season 1
- Presented by: Ticiana Villas Boas
- Judges: Carol Fiorentino; Fabrizio Fasano Jr.
- No. of contestants: 12
- Winner: Samira
- Runner-up: Ayrton
- No. of episodes: 13

Release
- Original network: SBT
- Original release: July 25 – October 17, 2015

Season chronology
- Next → Season 2

The first season of Bake Off Brasil premiered on July 25, 2015 at 9:30 p.m. on SBT.

== Bakers ==
The following is a list of contestants:

| Baker | Age | Occupation | Hometown | Status | Star Baker | Finish |
|---|---|---|---|---|---|---|
| Juliana Ferraz | 24 | Blogger | São Paulo | Eliminated 1st | 0 | —N/a |
| Eliane Correia | 40 | Journalist | Palmares | Eliminated 2nd | 0 | 12th |
| Miguel Pompeia | 40 | Administrator | São Paulo | Withdrew | 0 | 11th |
| Márcia Lucas | 42 | Architect | São Paulo | Eliminated 3rd | 0 | 10th |
| Bruno Sutil | 25 | Marketing Analist | Porto Alegre | Eliminated 4th | 0 | —N/a |
| Ronaldo Kurita | 35 | Architect | Macapá | Eliminated 5th | 1 | 9th |
| Gabriele "Gabi" Strano | 26 | Jiu-jitsu Fighter | Rio de Janeiro | Eliminated 6th | 1 | 8th |
| Bruno Sutil | 25 | Marketing analyst | Porto Alegre | Eliminated 7th | 0 | 7th |
| Joca Branco | 43 | Attorney | Pindamonhangaba | Eliminated 8th | 0 | 6th |
| Juliana Ferraz | 24 | Blogger | São Paulo | Eliminated 9th | 0 | 5th |
| Michael Ferreira | 27 | Student | São Paulo | Eliminated 10th | 2 | 4th |
| Marília Beznos | 45 | Dentist | São Paulo | Eliminated 11th | 2 | 3rd |
| Ayrton Bartoleti | 24 | Chemical engineer | São Bernardo do Campo | Runner-up | 1 | 2nd |
| Samira Ghannoum | 42 | Housewife | Goiânia | Winner | 4 | 1st |

== Results summary ==
Elimination chart
| Baker | 1 | 2 | 3 | 4 | 5 | 6 | 7 | 8 | 9 | 10 | 11 | 12 | 13 |
|---|---|---|---|---|---|---|---|---|---|---|---|---|---|
| Samira | | SB | | | | | | | SB | | SB | | WIN |
| Ayrton | | | | SB | | | | | | | | | OUT |
| Marília | | | | | | | | | | SB | | SB | OUT |
| Michael | | | | | | SB | | SB | | | | OUT | |
| Juliana | OUT | | | | | | RET | | | | OUT | | |
| Joca | | | | | | | | | | OUT | | | |
| Bruno | | | | | OUT | | RET | | OUT | | | | |
| Gabi | | | | | SB | | | OUT | | | | | |
| Ronaldo | SB | | | | | OUT | | | | | | | |
| Márcia | | | | OUT | | | | | | | | | |
| Miguel | | | WDR | | | | | | | | | | |
| Eliane | | OUT | | | | | | | | | | | |

Key
Advanced
Judges' favourite bakers
Star Baker
Eliminated
Judges' bottom bakers
Returned
Runner-up
Winner

=== Technical challenges ranking ===
| Baker | 1 | 2 | 3 | 4 | 5 | 6 | 7 | 8 | 9 | 10 | 11 | 12 | 13 |
|---|---|---|---|---|---|---|---|---|---|---|---|---|---|
| Samira | 8th | 4th | 1st | 5th | 2nd | 3rd | | 1st | 1st | 4th | 1st | 1st | 1st |
| Ayrton | 1st | 1st | 6th | 1st | 6th | 1st | | 5th | 2nd | 2nd | 4th | 4th | 2nd |
| Marília | 7th | 3rd | 3rd | 4th | 4th | 6th | | 4th | 7th | 1st | 3rd | 2nd | 3rd |
| Michael | 4th | 6th | 9th | 2nd | 5th | 2nd | | 2nd | 6th | 3rd | 2nd | 3rd | |
| Juliana | 12th | | | | | | —N/a | 6th | 3rd | 5th | 5th | | |
| Joca | 6th | 10th | 2nd | 8th | 7th | 7th | | 8th | 5th | 6th | | | |
| Bruno | 10th | 5th | 8th | 3rd | 8th | | 1st | 3rd | 4th | | | | |
| Gabi | 3rd | 2nd | 4th | 6th | 3rd | 4th | | 7th | | | | | |
| Ronaldo | 2nd | 8th | 7th | 7th | 1st | 5th | 2nd | | | | | | |
| Márcia | 9th | 11th | 5th | 9th | | | 3rd | | | | | | |
| Miguel | 11th | 7th | —N/a | | | | 5th | | | | | | |
| Eliane | 5th | 9th | | | | | 4th | | | | | | |

Key
Star Baker
Eliminated
