= Bake Off Brasil season 6 =

Bake Off Brasil
- Season 6
- Presented by: Nadja Haddad; Chris Flores; Ticiana Villas Boas
- Judges: Beca Milano; Olivier Anquier
- No. of contestants: 16
- Winner: Priscilla
- Runner-up: Flávio
- No. of episodes: 18

Release
- Original network: SBT; Discovery Home & Health
- Original release: August 15 – December 12, 2020

Season chronology
- ← Previous; Season 5 Next → Season 7

The sixth season of Bake Off Brasil premiered on August 15, 2020 at 10:30 p.m. on SBT.

After Nadja Haddad tested positive for COVID during filming, Chris Flores originally filled in as host, but was replaced by former main host Ticiana Villas Boas, who returned to the show (and Brazilian television) for the first time since the season 2 finale in 2016, which was followed by the bribery scandal between her husband Joesley Batista and former president Michel Temer in 2017.

Ticiana's unexpected return led to speculation in the media that she would replace Nadja permanently due to her influence in bringing sponsors from her husband's corporates back to the show. However, when one of the current sponsors, Döhler, learned from the press that SBT had replaced Nadja with Ticiana, they demanded her return as they already had hired her to be their poster girl.

Nadja Haddad finally returned to host the show after being away from filming for three weeks during her recovery, while Ticiana was announced as the new host of the spin-off show Bake Off Brasil: A Cereja do Bolo.

== Bakers ==
The following is a list of contestants:

Baker	Age	Occupation	Hometown	Status	Star Baker	Finish
Fernanda Giachini	24	Journalist	São Paulo	Eliminated 1st	0	16th
Gabriel "Biel" Santos	33	Advertiser	Belo Horizonte	Eliminated 2nd	0	15th
Juliana Weitman	34	Fashion designer	Atibaia	Eliminated 3rd	0	Returned
Eduardo Lopes	24	Cashier	Mandaguari	Eliminated 4th	0	14th
Gabriel Pita	32	Event producer	Ribeirão Preto	Eliminated 5th	0	Returned
Amanda Morais	28	Literature teacher	Pedregulho	Eliminated 6th	0	13th
Paola Galante	36	Teacher	Sorocaba	Eliminated 7th	0	Returned
Alexandre Palione	31	Sales promoter	Belo Horizonte	Eliminated 8th	0	12th
Talita Batista	34	Shopkeeper	São Paulo	Eliminated 9th	0	11th
Juliana Weitman	34	Fashion designer	Atibaia	Eliminated 10th	0	10th
Rafael Barbuda	34	Telecom technician	Rio de Janeiro	Eliminated 11th	1	9th
Gabriel Pita	32	Event producer	Ribeirão Preto	Eliminated 12th	0	8th
Rebeca Passarelli	27	Advertiser	São José do Rio Preto	Eliminated 13th	0	7th
Paola Galante	36	Teacher	Sorocaba	Eliminated 14th	0	6th
Fabiana Ramos	27	Lawyer	Canoas	Eliminated 15th	1	5th
Luís Gustavo Silva	19	Bakery clerk	Porto Feliz	Eliminated 16th	3	4th
Thais Macedo	30	Social worker	João Pessoa	Eliminated 17th	1	3rd
Flávio Amoedo	38	Belly dance teacher	Belém	Runner-up	4	2nd
Priscilla Grasso	38	Housewife	Indaiatuba	Winner	6	1st

== Results summary ==
Elimination chart
Baker	1	2	3	4	5	6	7	8	9	10	11	12	13	14	15	16	17	18
Priscilla	SB			SB			SB		SB							SB		WIN
Flávio		SB											SB					OUT
Thais					SB													OUT
Luís								SB				SB			SB		OUT	
Fabiana											SB					OUT		
Paola							OUT			RET					OUT			
Rebeca														OUT				
Gabriel					OUT					RET			OUT					
Rafael						SB						OUT						
Juliana			OUT							RET	OUT							
Talita									OUT									
Alexandre								OUT										
Amanda						OUT												
Eduardo				OUT														
Biel		OUT																
Fernanda	OUT																	

Key

Winner
Runner-up

Star Baker
Judges' favourite bakers
Advanced
Judges' bottom bakers
Eliminated
Returned

=== Technical challenges ranking ===
Baker	1	2	3	4	5	6	7	8	9	10	11	12	13	14	15	16	17	18
Priscilla	1st	11th	5th	2nd	4th	6th	1st	5th	1st		8th	9th	6th	4th	3rd	1st	2nd	1st
Flávio	6th	1st	2nd	1st	2nd	5th	3rd	2nd	2nd		10th	2nd	1st	1st	5th	3rd	1st	2nd
Thais	3rd	4th	6th	8th	1st	3rd	4th	6th	6th		5th	3rd	5th	2nd	4th	2nd	3rd	3rd
Luís	4th	7th	4th	3rd	6th	2nd	2nd	1st	5th		4th	1st	2nd	3rd	1st	5th	4th	
Fabiana	10th	8th	3rd	12th	7th	7th	8th	7th	3rd		1st	5th	3rd	6th	2nd	4th		
Paola	13th	9th	10th	6th	9th	10th	6th			2nd	6th	6th	7th	5th	6th			
Rebeca	9th	2nd	8th	5th	10th	4th	10th	4th	4th		7th	4th	4th	7th				
Gabriel	11th	3rd	1st	9th	11th					—	2nd	7th	8th					
Rafael	2nd	6th	9th	7th	3rd	1st	9th	3rd	8th		3rd	8th						
Juliana	7th	14th	11th							1st	10th							
Talita	5th	12th	13th	10th	12th	8th	7th	8th	7th	4th								
Alexandre	14th	10th	14th	4th	8th	9th	5th	9th		7th								
Amanda	8th	5th	7th	11th	5th	11th				3rd								
Eduardo	15th	13th	12th	13th						6th								
Biel	12th	15th								5th								
Fernanda	16th									8th								

Key
Star Baker
Eliminated

== Ratings and reception ==
=== Brazilian ratings ===
All numbers are in points and provided by Kantar Ibope Media.

Episode	Air date	Timeslot (BRT)	SP viewers (in points)	Source
1	August 15, 2020	Saturday 10:30 p.m.	6.6	
2	August 22, 2020	Saturday 10:30 p.m.	7.3	
3	August 29, 2020	Saturday 10:30 p.m.	6.5	
4	September 5, 2020	Saturday 10:30 p.m.	7.2	
5	September 12, 2020	Saturday 10:30 p.m.	6.4	
6	September 19, 2020	Saturday 10:30 p.m.	5.9	
7	September 26, 2020	Saturday 10:30 p.m.	5.8	
8	October 3, 2020	Saturday 10:30 p.m.	6.5	
9	October 10, 2020	Saturday 10:30 p.m.	5.6	
10	October 17, 2020	Saturday 10:30 p.m.	6.3	
11	October 24, 2020	Saturday 10:30 p.m.	6.5	
12	October 31, 2020	Saturday 10:30 p.m.	5.8	
13	November 7, 2020	Saturday 10:30 p.m.	5.8	
14	November 14, 2020	Saturday 10:30 p.m.	6.4	
15	November 21, 2020	Saturday 10:30 p.m.	6.1	
16	November 28, 2020	Saturday 10:30 p.m.	6.5	
17	December 5, 2020	Saturday 10:30 p.m.	5.5	
18	December 12, 2020	Saturday 10:30 p.m.	5.5	

- In 2020, each point represents 260.558 households in 15 market cities in Brazil (74.987 households in São Paulo).
