= Bake Off Brasil season 11 =

Bake Off Brasil
- Season 11
- Presented by: Nadja Haddad
- Judges: Beca Milano; Giuseppe Gerundino
- No. of contestants: 18
- Winner: Ney
- Runner-up: Gustavo
- No. of episodes: 19

Release
- Original network: SBT; HBO Max; Discovery Home & Health
- Original release: August 9 – December 20, 2025

Season chronology
- ← Previous; Season 10 Next → Season 12

The eleventh season of Bake Off Brasil premiered on Saturday, August 9, 2025 at 9:00 p.m. on SBT, with episodes subsequently released weekly on HBO Max and Discovery Home & Health, beginning August 15, 2025.

On February 25, 2025, it was announced that host Fabiana Karla and judges Carole Crema and André Mifano had left the series after one season. Nadja Haddad, Beca Milano, and Giuseppe Gerundino returned to the show after a one-year hiatus.

== Bakers ==
The following is a list of contestants:

Baker	Age	Occupation	Hometown	Status	Star Baker	Finish
Douglas Sá	32	Hospital chef	Osasco	Eliminated 1st	0	18th
Cátia Guimarães	51	Event organizer	Belo Horizonte	Eliminated 2nd	0	17th
Thomas Almeida	39	Ice cream seller	Rio de Janeiro	Eliminated 3rd	0	Returned
Darlan Martins	37	Tattoo artist	São Sebastião	Eliminated 4th	0	16th
Bruna Reis	30	Seller	Icó	Eliminated 5th	0	15th
José Roberto	41	Dancer	Samambaia	Eliminated 6th	0	14th
Adriana Zonta	51	Jewelry designer	São Paulo	Eliminated 7th	0	13th
Carlos Leme	43	Engineer	Santana de Parnaíba	Eliminated 8th	0	12th
Eliete Souza	36	Administrative assistant	Macaúbas	Eliminated 9th	0	11th
Lucas Lira	29	Seller	Monte Santo	Eliminated 10th	0	Returned
Babi Martins	30	Content creator	Itabira	Eliminated 11th	0	10th
Thomas Almeida	39	Ice cream seller	Rio de Janeiro	Eliminated 12th	0	9th
Lucas Lira	29	Seller	Monte Santo	Eliminated 13th	0	8th
Marina Daibert	33	Administrative assistant	São B. do Campo	Eliminated 14th	1	7th
Ana Cristina Gemino	61	Self employed	Rio de Janeiro	Eliminated 15th	0	6th
Carol Torres	35	Administrator	Rio de Janeiro	Eliminated 16th	2	5th
Bruno Fantini	27	Financial coordinator	Artur Nogueira	Eliminated 17th	3	4th
Angela Gomes	26	Waitress	Praia Grande	Eliminated 18th	2	3rd
Gustavo Riviera	24	Businessman	Pará de Minas	Runner-up	3	2nd
Ney Santos	38	Sales manager	Manaus	Winner	5	1st

== Results summary ==
Elimination chart
Baker	1	2	3	4	5	6	7	8	9	10	11	12	13	14	15	16	17	18	19
Ney	SB	SAFE	SAFE	LOW	HIGH	SAFE	SB	HIGH	SAFE	SB	SAFE		SAFE	SB	SB	SAFE	LOW	HIGH	WIN
Gustavo	SAFE	SAFE	HIGH	SB	HIGH	HIGH	HIGH	SB	HIGH	HIGH	SAFE		HIGH	HIGH	HIGH	SB	LOW	HIGH	OUT
Angela	HIGH	SAFE	SAFE	HIGH	SAFE	SB	SAFE	HIGH	HIGH	LOW	HIGH		SAFE	SAFE	HIGH	LOW	SB	HIGH	OUT
Bruno	SAFE	SB	HIGH	SAFE	SB	SAFE	SAFE	SAFE	SB	HIGH	SAFE		HIGH	SAFE	SAFE	HIGH	HIGH	OUT	
Carol	SAFE	SAFE	SB	SAFE	SAFE	SAFE	SAFE	SAFE	SAFE	SAFE	SAFE		SB	HIGH	SAFE	HIGH	OUT		
Ana Cristina	SAFE	HIGH	SAFE	HIGH	SAFE	LOW	HIGH	SAFE	SAFE	SAFE	HIGH		LOW	LOW	LOW	OUT			
Marina	SAFE	SAFE	LOW	SAFE	LOW	SAFE	SAFE	LOW	LOW	LOW	SB		SAFE	SAFE	OUT				
Lucas	SAFE	HIGH	SAFE	SAFE	SAFE	HIGH	SAFE	SAFE	SAFE	OUT		RET	SAFE	OUT					
Thomas	SAFE	SAFE	OUT									RET	OUT						
Babi	SAFE	SAFE	SAFE	SAFE	SAFE	SAFE	SAFE	SAFE	SAFE	SAFE	OUT								
Eliete	SAFE	SAFE	LOW	SAFE	SAFE	SAFE	LOW	SAFE	OUT										
Carlos	SAFE	SAFE	SAFE	SAFE	SAFE	SAFE	SAFE	OUT											
Adriana	HIGH	SAFE	SAFE	SAFE	SAFE	SAFE	OUT												
José Roberto	SAFE	SAFE	SAFE	SAFE	SAFE	OUT													
Bruna	LOW	SAFE	SAFE	SAFE	OUT														
Darlan	SAFE	LOW	SAFE	OUT															
Cátia	SAFE	OUT																	
Douglas	OUT																		

Key

Winner
Runner-up

Star Baker
Judges' favourite bakers
Judges' bottom bakers
Eliminated
Returned

=== Technical challenges ranking ===
Baker	1	2	3	4	5	6	7	8	9	10	11	12	13	14	15	16	17	18	19
Ney	3rd	5th	6th	12th	2nd	9th	2nd	2nd	4th	1st	6th		7th	1st	2nd	4th	3rd	2nd	1st
Gustavo	10th	4th	1st	1st	3rd	3rd	1st	1st	1st	3rd	4th		2nd	3rd	1st	2nd	5th	1st	2nd
Angela	2nd	8th	11th	3rd	8th	1st	6th	3rd	3rd	9th	3rd		4th	6th	3rd	5th	1st	4th	3rd
Bruno	12th	2nd	2nd	7th	1st	5th	11th	6th	2nd	2nd	5th		3rd	4th	6th	3rd	2nd	3rd	
Carol	14th	6th	3rd	5th	12th	7th	5th	5th	6th	5th	7th		1st	2nd	4th	1st	4th		
Ana Cristina	4th	3rd	9th	2nd	11th	6th	3rd	7th	5th	7th	1st		9th	7th	5th	6th			
Marina	13th	15th	16th	6th	13th	11th	7th	10th	7th	6th	2nd		5th	5th	7th				
Lucas	6th	1st	12th	14th	10th	2nd	9th	9th	10th	8th		—	6th	8th					
Thomas	8th	12th	10th									1st	8th						
Babi	15th	7th	7th	10th	4th	4th	8th	4th	9th	4th	8th	6th							
Eliete	7th	10th	13th	11th	9th	10th	10th	8th	8th			2nd							
Carlos	5th	13th	15th	8th	5th	8th	4th	11th				5th							
Adriana	1st	9th	8th	4th	7th	12th	12th					4th							
José Roberto	9th	11th	4th	9th	6th	13th						3rd							
Bruna	18th	14th	5th	13th	14th							9th							
Darlan	17th	16th	14th	15th								7th							
Cátia	11th	17th										10th							
Douglas	16th											8th							

Key
Star Baker
Eliminated

== Ratings and reception ==
=== Brazilian ratings ===
All numbers are in points and provided by Kantar Ibope Media.

Episode	Air date	Timeslot (BRT)	SP viewers (in points)	Source
1	August 9, 2025	Saturday 9:00 p.m.	3.3	
2	August 16, 2025	Saturday 9:00 p.m.	3.3	
3	August 23, 2025	Saturday 9:00 p.m.	3.5	
4	August 30, 2025	Saturday 9:00 p.m.	3.3	
5	September 6, 2025	Saturday 9:00 p.m.	3.1	
6	September 13, 2025	Saturday 9:00 p.m.	2.8	
7	September 20, 2025	Saturday 9:00 p.m.	2.7	
8	September 27, 2025	Saturday 9:00 p.m.	2.9	
9	October 4, 2025	Saturday 9:00 p.m.	2.6	
10	October 11, 2025	Saturday 9:00 p.m.	3.1	
11	October 18, 2025	Saturday 9:00 p.m.	4.0	
12	October 25, 2025	Saturday 9:00 p.m.	3.6	
13	November 1, 2025	Saturday 9:00 p.m.	3.2	
14	November 15, 2025	Saturday 9:00 p.m.	3.4	
15	November 22, 2025	Saturday 9:00 p.m.	3.3	
16	November 29, 2025	Saturday 9:00 p.m.	3.9	
17	December 6, 2025	Saturday 9:00 p.m.	2.8	
18	December 13, 2025	Saturday 9:00 p.m.	3.3	
19	December 20, 2025	Saturday 9:00 p.m.	2.7	

- In 2025, each point represents 270.631 households in 15 market cities in Brazil (77.488 households in São Paulo).
