= Junior Bake Off Brasil season 3 =

Junior Bake Off Brasil
- Season 3
- Presented by: Nadja Haddad
- Judges: Beca Milano; Olivier Anquier
- No. of contestants: 12
- Winner: David
- Runner-up: Anita
- No. of episodes: 7

Release
- Original network: SBT
- Original release: February 15 – March 28, 2020

Season chronology
- ← Previous; Season 2

The third season of Junior Bake Off Brasil premiered on February 15, 2020 at 10:30 p.m. on SBT.

== Bakers ==
The following is a list of contestants:

Baker	Age	Hometown	Status	Finish
Arthur Boeno	10	Carapicuíba	Eliminated 1st	—
Tatiana	9	São Paulo	Eliminated 1st	12th
Nicolas Mar	10	São Paulo	Eliminated 2nd	11th 10th
Antonella Sanson	10	São Paulo	Eliminated 2nd	11th 10th
Jun Kinjo Okumura	8	Santos	Eliminated 3rd	9th 8th
Katherine Tedesco	8	São Paulo	Eliminated 3rd	9th 8th
David Caldeira	11	Fortaleza	Eliminated 4th	—
Maria Luisa Grandi	11	São Paulo	Eliminated 4th	—
Arthur Boeno	10	Carapicuíba	Eliminated 5th	7th 6th
Victor Hugo Martins	10	São Paulo	Eliminated 5th	7th 6th
Eduarda Nogueira	11	Araruama	Eliminated 6th	5th 4th 3rd
Kyara Magalhães	10	São Paulo	Eliminated 6th	5th 4th 3rd
Maria Luisa Grandi	11	São Paulo	Eliminated 6th	5th 4th 3rd
Anita Freire	10	São Paulo	Runner-up	2nd
David Caldeira	11	Fortaleza	Winner	1st

== Results summary ==
Baker	1	2	3	4	5	6	7
David		SB		OUT	RET	SB	WIN
Anita			SB				OUT
Eduarda				SB			OUT
Kyara							OUT
Maria Luisa	SB			OUT	RET		OUT
Arthur	OUT				RET	OUT	
Victor Hugo						OUT	
Jun			OUT				
Katherine			OUT				
Antonella		OUT					
Nicolas		OUT					
Tatiana	OUT						

Key
Advanced
Judges' favourite bakers
Star Baker
Eliminated
Judges' bottom bakers
Returned
Runner-up
Winner

=== Technical challenges ranking ===
Baker	1	2	3	4	5	6	7
David	2nd	5th	1st	4th	—	1st	2nd
Anita	3rd	1st	3rd	3rd		3rd	1st
Eduarda	12th	9th	5th	2nd		6th	—
Kyara	5th	4th	4th	5th		2nd	—
Maria Luisa	4th	3rd	2nd	6th	2nd	7th	—
Arthur	11th				1st	5th	
Victor Hugo	8th	8th	6th	1st		4th	
Jun	6th	7th	7th		7th		
Katherine	1st	2nd	8th		5th		
Antonella	10th	6th			4th		
Nicolas	7th	10th			3rd		
Tatiana	9th				6th		

Key
Star Baker
Eliminated

== Ratings and reception ==
=== Brazilian ratings ===
All numbers are in points and provided by Kantar Ibope Media.

Episode	Title	Air date	Timeslot (BRT)	SP viewers (in points)	Source
1	Top 12	February 15, 2020	Saturday 10:30 p.m.	7.8	
2	Top 10	February 22, 2020	Saturday 10:30 p.m.	6.8	
3	Top 8	February 29, 2020	Saturday 10:30 p.m.	7.5	
4	Top 6	March 7, 2020	Saturday 10:30 p.m.	7.3	
5	Wildcard	March 14, 2020	Saturday 10:30 p.m.	7.9	
6	Top 7 Redux	March 21, 2020	Saturday 10:30 p.m.	8.3	
7	Winner announced	March 28, 2020	Saturday 10:30 p.m.	7.6	

- In 2020, each point represents 260.558 households in 15 market cities in Brazil (74.987 households in São Paulo).
