= Gründer =

Gründer or Grunder is a German-language surname and a variant of the topographic surname Grund denoting an inhabitant. It may refer to:

- Anita Grunder, American geologist
- Hans Grunder (1956), Swiss politician
- Hermann A. Grunder (1931), Swiss-American nuclear and accelerator physicist
- Nils Gründer (born 1997), German politician
- René Gründer (1975), German sociologist
