= Bake Off Brasil season 8 =

Bake Off Brasil
- Season 8
- Presented by: Nadja Haddad
- Judges: Beca Milano; Giuseppe Gerundino
- No. of contestants: 18
- Winner: Camilo
- Runner-up: Leonardo
- No. of episodes: 19

Release
- Original network: SBT; Discovery Home & Health
- Original release: August 6 – December 17, 2022

Season chronology
- ← Previous; Season 7 Next → Season 9

The eighth season of Bake Off Brasil premiered on August 6, 2022, at 10:30 p.m. on SBT.

This season marks the debut of Giuseppe Gerundino as a judge, replacing Olivier Anquier, who left the show following production of the second season of Bake Off Celebridades.

== Bakers ==
The following is a list of contestants:

Baker	Age	Occupation	Hometown	Status	Star Baker	Finish
Lola Kaulinis	44	Interior designer	Buenos Aires, Argentina	Eliminated 1st	0	18th
Thayná Fleira	26	Digital analyst	Jundiaí	Eliminated 2nd	0	17th
Rogéria Martins	54	Dressmaker	Rio de Janeiro	Eliminated 3rd	0	16th
Fresley Chaves	39	Administrator	Uberlândia	Eliminated 4th	0	15th
Beatriz Maia	28	Nutritionist	Rio de Janeiro	Eliminated 5th	0	14th
Emilly Graziela	25	Hospital attendant	São Paulo	Eliminated 6th	0	Returned
Talita Gomes	33	Jewelry saleswoman	Indaiatuba	Eliminated 7th	0	13th
Rodrigo Farias	25	Hospital cook	São Paulo	Eliminated 8th	0	12th
Juliana Wilken	45	Psychologist	São Paulo	Eliminated 9th	0	11th
Ethelandia Duarte	44	Wedding decorator	Recife	Eliminated 10th	0	Returned
Márcio Mattos	42	Gospel Singer	Limeira	Eliminated 11th	0	10th
Ethelandia Duarte	44	Wedding decorator	Recife	Eliminated 12th	0	9th
Emilly Graziela	25	Hospital attendant	São Paulo	Withdrew	0	8th
Maria Laura	30	Architect	São Paulo	Eliminated 13th	1	7th
João Pedro Araujo	27	Businessman	Rio de Janeiro	Eliminated 14th	0	6th
Renan Rodrigues	30	Student	Granada, Spain	Eliminated 15th	0	5th
Lucas Rosa	22	Entrepreneur	São Paulo	Eliminated 16th	1	4th
Fabiano dos Santos	40	Merchant	Cornélio Procópio	Eliminated 17th	6	3rd
Leonardo Anterio	24	Commercial manager	Curitiba	Runner-up	2	2nd
Camilo Lucas	26	Choreographer	Duque de Caxias	Winner	6	1st

== Results summary ==
Elimination chart
Baker	1	2	3	4	5	6	7	8	9	10	11	12	13	14	15	16	17	18	19
Camilo				SB					SB					SB					WIN
Leonardo			SB							SB									OUT
Fabiano	SB					SB							SB				SB		OUT
Lucas								SB										OUT	
Renan																	OUT		
João Pedro																OUT			
Maria Laura												SB			OUT				
Emilly						OUT					RET			WDR					
Ethelandia										OUT	RET		OUT						
Márcio												OUT							
Juliana									OUT										
Rodrigo								OUT											
Talita							OUT												
Beatriz					OUT														
Fresley				OUT															
Rogéria			OUT																
Thayná		OUT																	
Lola	OUT																		

Key

Winner
Runner-up

Star Baker
Judges' favourite bakers
Advanced
Judges' bottom bakers
Eliminated
Returned

=== Technical challenges ranking ===
Baker	1	2	3	4	5	6	7	8	9	10	11	12	13	14	15	16	17	18	19
Camilo	4th	6th	11th	3rd	1st	5th	5th	3rd	2nd	7th		3rd	8th	2nd	1st	2nd	1st	2nd	2nd
Leonardo	6th	10th	1st	8th	6th	7th	6th	5th	6th	1st		5th	5th	3rd	2nd	6th	3rd	1st	1st
Fabiano	3rd	1st	5th	2nd	2nd	2nd	2nd	2nd	5th	6th		4th	1st	7th	3rd	4th	2nd	4th	3rd
Lucas	2nd	4th	4th	1st	3rd	1st	1st	1st	1st	3rd		1st	3rd	1st	5th	1st	4th	3rd	
Renan	7th	5th	8th	10th	9th	3rd	8th	4th	4th	2nd		6th	6th	6th	4th	3rd	5th		
João Pedro	1st	2nd	2nd	5th	4th	12th	4th	8th	3rd	5th		8th	2nd	5th	6th	5th			
Maria Laura	9th	3rd	9th	4th	5th	6th	10th	7th	7th	8th		2nd	7th	4th	7th				
Emilly	8th	13th	12th	15th	13th	13th					–	7th	4th	–					
Ethelandia	11th	17th	16th	13th	11th	8th	9th	11th	9th	9th	1st	9th	9th						
Márcio	12th	9th	3rd	7th	12th	9th	11th	9th	8th	4th		10th							
Juliana	13th	14th	10th	12th	7th	11th	7th	6th	10th										
Rodrigo	14th	7th	6th	9th	8th	4th	3rd	10th			7th								
Talita	15th	12th	13th	11th	10th	10th	12th				8th								
Beatriz	17th	8th	7th	6th	14th						2nd								
Fresley	5th	11th	14th	14th							4th								
Rogéria	16th	15th	15th								3rd								
Thayná	10th	16th									5th								
Lola	18th										6th								

Key
Star Baker
Eliminated

== Ratings and reception ==
=== Brazilian ratings ===
All numbers are in points and provided by Kantar Ibope Media.

Episode	Air date	Timeslot (BRT)	SP viewers (in points)	Source
1	August 6, 2022	Saturday 10:30 p.m.	5.1	
2	August 13, 2022	Saturday 10:30 p.m.	5.3	
3	August 20, 2022	Saturday 10:30 p.m.	5.8	
4	August 27, 2022	Saturday 10:30 p.m.	5.4	
5	September 3, 2022	Saturday 10:30 p.m.	4.8	
6	September 10, 2022	Saturday 10:30 p.m.	5.1	
7	September 17, 2022	Saturday 10:30 p.m.	5.2	
8	September 24, 2022	Saturday 10:30 p.m.	4.5	
9	October 1, 2022	Saturday 10:30 p.m.	5.4	
10	October 8, 2022	Saturday 10:30 p.m.	4.2	
11	October 15, 2022	Saturday 10:30 p.m.	4.5	
12	October 22, 2022	Saturday 10:30 p.m.	4.5	
13	October 29, 2022	Saturday 10:30 p.m.	5.1	
14	November 12, 2022	Saturday 10:30 p.m.	4.6	
15	November 19, 2022	Saturday 10:30 p.m.	5.2	
16	November 26, 2022	Saturday 10:30 p.m.	4.9	
17	December 3, 2022	Saturday 10:30 p.m.	4.5	
18	December 10, 2022	Saturday 10:30 p.m.	4.0	
19	December 17, 2022	Saturday 10:30 p.m.	4.7	

- In 2022, each point represents 258.821 households in 15 market cities in Brazil (74.666 households in São Paulo).
