= Bake Off Brasil =

- Genre: Cooking; Baking; Reality
- Based on: The Great British Bake Off
- Presented by: Nadja Haddad; Ticiana Villas Boas; Carol Fiorentino; Chris Flores; Fabiana Karla
- Judges: Beca Milano; Giuseppe Gerundino; Carol Fiorentino; Fabrizio Fasano Jr.; Olivier Anquier; Carole Crema; André Mifano
- Country of origin: Brazil
- Original language: Portuguese
- No. of seasons: 12
- No. of episodes: 203

Production
- Production locations: São Paulo, São Paulo
- Camera setup: Multiple-camera
- Running time: 60 minutes (2015–16); 120 minutes (2017–23); 90 minutes (2024–present)

Original release
- Network: SBT; Discovery Home & Health; HBO Max
- Release: July 25, 2015 – present

Related
- The Great British Bake Off

Bake Off Brasil: Mão na Massa (English: Bake Off Brasil: Hands On), also known internationally as Bake Off Brazil: The Great Brazilian Baking Show and simply referred to as Bake Off Brasil, is a Brazilian reality television series based on the BBC baking competition The Great British Bake Off.

The series premiered on Saturday, 25 July 2015, at 9:30 p.m. (BRT / AMT) on SBT, aiming to find the best amateur baker in Brazil.

== Cast ==
=== Host and judges ===
The first two seasons were hosted by Ticiana Villas Boas and judged by Carol Fiorentino and Fabrizio Fasano Jr. Following Ticiana's departure, Carol became host in season 3, while Beca Milano joined the judging panel. After Carol and Fasano left, Nadja Haddad replaced Carol as host in season 4, while Olivier Anquier joined the panel. In season 6, Nadja tested positive for COVID-19 and was temporarily replaced by Chris Flores, followed by Ticiana Villas Boas, who returned to the show for the first time since season 2.

Olivier left the show after season 7 and was replaced by Giuseppe Gerundino in season 8. In 2024, Beca left SBT, and the series was initially cancelled, but production resumed through an agreement with Warner Bros. Discovery. Fabiana Karla became host for season 10, with Carole Crema and André Mifano joining as judges. After one season, all three left the show, and Nadja Haddad, Beca Milano, and Giuseppe Gerundino returned for season 11.

Key
Host
Judge

Cast member	Seasons											
Cast member	1	2	3	4	5	6	7	8	9	10	11	12
Carol Fiorentino												
Fabrizio Fasano Jr.												
Beca Milano												
Olivier Anquier												
Giuseppe Gerundino												
André Mifano												
Carole Crema												
Ticiana Villas Boas												
Nadja Haddad												
Chris Flores												
Fabiana Karla												

== Series overview ==
Season	No. of bakers	No. of weeks	Winner	Runner-up	Third place
1	12	13	Samira Ghannoum	Ayrton Bartoleti	Marilia Beznos
2	14	15	Camila Poli	Noemy Caangi	Marcos Souza
3	16	18	Dário Héberson	Johanna Aquino	José Negreiros
4	16	18	Ricardo Daudt	Nayane Capistrano	Núbia Moraes
5	16	18	Karoline Barbeirotti	João Francisco	João Silveira
6	16	18	Priscilla Grasso	Flávio Amoedo	Thais Macedo
7	18	21	Gileade Santana	Nathanael Santos	Julio Cepe
8	18	19	Camilo Lucas	Leonardo Anterio	Fabiano dos Santos
9	18	19	Marcel Toni	Fabiano Miranda	Luan Gomes
10	18	19	Eli Alencar	Danilo Guerini	Juliano Faller
11	18	19	Ney Santos	Gustavo Riviera	Angela Gomes
12	18	19			

=== Ratings and reception ===
Season	Timeslot (BRT)	Premiered		Ended		TV season	SP viewers (in points)	Source
Season	Timeslot (BRT)	Date	Viewers (in points)	Date	Viewers (in points)	TV season	SP viewers (in points)	Source
1	Saturday 9:30 p.m.	25 July 2015	6.9	17 October 2015	7.5	2015	6.92	
2	Saturday 9:30 p.m.	21 May 2016	8.5	27 August 2016	9.5	2016	8.54	
3	Saturday 9:30 p.m.	12 August 2017	7.6	16 December 2017	9.4	2017	8.17	
4	Saturday 10:30 p.m.	11 August 2018	10.9	15 December 2018	10.3	2018	10.30	
5	Saturday 10:30 p.m.	10 August 2019	9.7	14 December 2019	9.6	2019	8.93	
6	Saturday 10:30 p.m.	15 August 2020	6.6	12 December 2020	5.5	2020	6.23	
7	Saturday 10:30 p.m.	24 July 2021	5.8	18 December 2021	5.6	2021	5.20	
8	Saturday 10:30 p.m.	6 August 2022	5.1	17 December 2022	4.7	2022	4.88	
9	Saturday 10:30 p.m.	12 August 2023	3.7	23 December 2023	3.8	2023	3.90	
10	Saturday 9:00 p.m.	10 August 2024	5.8	28 December 2024	3.6	2024	3.90	
11	Saturday 9:00 p.m.	9 August 2025	3.3	20 December 2025	2.7	2025	3.20	
12	Saturday 9:00 p.m.	1 August 2026	2.3	12 December 2026		2026		

- Each point represents a specific number of households in São Paulo.
  - 2015: 67.000 households.
  - 2016: 69.000 households.
  - 2017: 70.500 households.
  - 2018: 71.855 households.
  - 2019: 73.015 households.
  - 2020: 74.987 households.
  - 2021: 76.577 households.
  - 2022: 74.666 households.
  - 2023: 76.953 households.
  - 2024: 73.279 households.
  - 2025: 77.488 households.
  - 2026: 78.780 households.

== Spin-offs ==
=== Bake Off SBT ===
Bake Off SBT is a special holiday series featuring celebrities from SBT as contestants, aiming to find the best amateur celebrity baker from SBT. The series premiered on 23 December 2017.

=== Junior Bake Off Brasil ===
Junior Bake Off Brasil is a series featuring children from ages 8 to 13 as contestants, aiming to find the best junior baker in Brazil. The series premiered on 6 January 2018.

=== Bake Off Brasil: A Cereja do Bolo ===
Due to the impact of the COVID-19 pandemic on television, SBT pushed back the premiere of the new season of Fábrica de Casamentos to mid 2020 and opted to create Bake Off Brasil: A Cereja do Bolo (English: Bake Off Brasil: The Icing on the Cake) to fill the programming gap.

The series is a compilation show highlighting the most memorable moments of the franchise. The retrospectives are hosted by Nadja Haddad and also includes revisited recipes by judge Beca Milano, catch-ups with past contestants and appearances of celebrity guests Matheus Ceará and Juliana Oliveira. The series premiered on 2 May 2020. Ticiana Villas Boas replaced Nadja as the host on season 2. Beca Milano was joined by fellow Bake Off Brasil judge Olivier Anquier on season 2. Dony De Nuccio replaced Ticiana as the host on season 3.

==== Ratings and reception ====
Season	Timeslot (BRT)	Premiered		Ended		TV season	SP viewers (in points)	Source
Season	Timeslot (BRT)	Date	Viewers (in points)	Date	Viewers (in points)	TV season	SP viewers (in points)	Source
1	Saturday 10:30 p.m.	2 May 2020	7.1	20 June 2020	6.2	2020	—	
2	Saturday 9:30 p.m.	22 August 2020	4.5	19 December 2020	4.6	2020	—	
3	Saturday 9:30 p.m.	4 September 2021	4.0	25 December 2021	5.0	2021	—	
4	Saturday 9:30 p.m.	27 August 2022	4.0	24 December 2022	1.9	2022	—	

=== Bake Off Celebridades ===
Bake Off Celebridades, is series featuring celebrities as contestants, aiming to find the best amateur celebrity baker in Brazil. However, unlike Bake Off SBT, it is a full celebrity series instead of a two-episode holiday special and the contestants are not necessarily employees of the network. The series premiered on 20 February 2021.
