= Bake Off Brasil season 3 =

Bake Off Brasil
- Season 3
- Presented by: Carol Fiorentino
- Judges: Beca Milano; Fabrizio Fasano Jr.
- No. of contestants: 16
- Winner: Dário
- Runner-up: Johanna
- No. of episodes: 18

Release
- Original network: SBT
- Original release: August 12 – December 16, 2017

Season chronology
- ← Previous; Season 2 Next → Season 4

The third season of Bake Off Brasil premiered on August 12, 2017 at 9:30 p.m. on SBT.

This season marks the debut of Carol Fiorentino as the main host, replacing Ticiana Villas Boas, who left the show due to the leak of her husband's controversial bribery allegations with Brazil's president Michel Temer. Beca Milano replaced Fiorentino in the judging panel.

== Bakers ==
The following is a list of contestants:

Baker	Age	Occupation	Hometown	Status	Star Baker	Finish
Sileide Teka	35	Real estate management	São Paulo	Eliminated 1st	0	16th
Douglas Oliveira	40	Monk	Mogi das Cruzes	Eliminated 2nd	0	—N/a
Nena Maria	28	Photographer	Palmeira dos Índios	Eliminated 3rd	0	15th
Liany Rocha	39	Accounting technique	São Paulo	Eliminated 4th	0	14th
Marina Queiroz	36	Former funk singer	Rio de Janeiro	Eliminated 5th	0	—N/a
Monique Tupy	25	Dentist assistant	Jacinto	Eliminated 6th	0	13th
Débora Leite	29	Treasurer	São Paulo	Eliminated 7th	0	12th
Iaiá Sobrano	67	Cook	Itápolis	Eliminated 8th	0	11th
Richarles Rodrigues	21	Graphic designer	Rio Branco	Eliminated 9th	0	—N/a
Douglas Oliveira	40	Monk	Mogi das Cruzes	Eliminated 10th	0	10th
Richarles Rodrigues	21	Graphic designer	Rio Branco	Eliminated 11th	0	9th
Marina Queiroz	36	Former funk singer	Rio de Janeiro	Eliminated 12th	0	8th
Karyne Sugayama	38	Art director	Londrina	Eliminated 13th	2	7th
Gigi Louzada	36	Flight attendant	Blumenau	Eliminated 14th	1	6th
Flavio Duarte	44	Butler	Arapongas	Eliminated 15th	1	5th
Ney Martins	29	Decorator	Turvânia	Eliminated 16th	1	4th
José Negreiros	36	Jiu Jitsu instructor	Campinas	Eliminated 17th	4	3rd
Johanna Aquino	29	Advertiser	Petrolina	Runner-up	3	2nd
Dário Héberson	25	Public agent	Ribeira do Pombal	Winner	4	1st

== Results summary ==
Elimination chart
Baker	1	2	3	4	5	6	7	8	9	10	11	12	13	14	15	16	17	18
Dário		SB											SB				SB	WIN
Johanna			SB					SB							SB			OUT
José					SB							SB				SB		OUT
Ney				SB													OUT	
Flavio											SB					OUT		
Gigi									SB						OUT			
Karyne	SB						SB							OUT				
Marina					OUT					RET			OUT					
Richarles									OUT	RET		OUT						
Douglas		OUT								RET	OUT							
Iaiá								OUT										
Débora							OUT											
Monique						OUT												
Liany				OUT														
Nena			OUT															
Sileide	OUT																	

Key
Advanced
Judges' favourite bakers
Star Baker
Eliminated
Judges' bottom bakers
Returned
Runner-up
Winner

=== Technical challenges ranking ===
Baker	1	2	3	4	5	6	7	8	9	10	11	12	13	14	15	16	17	18
Dário	2nd	1st	2nd	10th	6th	2nd	4th	4th	2nd		4th	6th	1st	2nd	1st	3rd	2nd	1st
Johanna	7th	5th	1st	8th	7th	9th	3rd	1st	3rd		2nd	7th	7th	4th	2nd	2nd	1st	2nd
José	13th	10th	13th	1st	1st	4th	5th	2nd	6th		6th	2nd	3rd	1st	3rd	1st	3rd	3rd
Ney	8th	9th	6th	2nd	2nd	10th	6th	8th	5th		3rd	4th	2nd	7th	6th	4th	4th	
Flávio	3rd	3rd	3rd	3rd	11th	1st	1st	9th	7th		1st	3rd	8th	3rd	4th	5th		
Gigi	10th	11th	5th	11th	4th	5th	8th	6th	1st		5th	8th	4th	5th	5th			
Karyne	1st	2nd	12th	12th	5th	8th	2nd	3rd	8th		8th	1st	5th	6th				
Marina	15th	8th	8th	5th	12th					—N/a	7th	5th	6th					
Richarles	5th	7th	9th	6th	3rd	7th	9th	5th	4th	1st	—N/a	9th						
Douglas	14th	13th								2nd	9th							
Iaiá	11th	14th	4th	4th	9th	6th	7th	7th		6th								
Débora	9th	4th	7th	7th	8th	3rd	10th			5th								
Monique	6th	6th	14th	9th	10th	11th				3rd								
Liany	12th	12th	10th	13th						7th								
Nena	4th	15th	11th							4th								
Sileide	16th									8th								

Key
Star Baker
Eliminated

== Ratings and reception ==
=== Brazilian ratings ===
All numbers are in points and provided by Kantar Ibope Media.

Episode	Title	Air date	Timeslot (BRT)	SP viewers (in points)	Source
1	Top 16	August 12, 2017	Saturday 9:30 p.m.	7.6	
2	Top 15	August 19, 2017	Saturday 9:30 p.m.	6.8	
3	Top 14	August 26, 2017	Saturday 9:30 p.m.	7.4	
4	Top 13	September 2, 2017	Saturday 9:30 p.m.	7.4	
5	Top 12	September 9, 2017	Saturday 9:30 p.m.	8.0	
6	Top 11	September 16, 2017	Saturday 9:30 p.m.	7.8	
7	Top 10	September 23, 2017	Saturday 9:30 p.m.	6.9	
8	Top 9	September 30, 2017	Saturday 9:30 p.m.	8.2	
9	Top 8	October 7, 2017	Saturday 9:30 p.m.	8.3	
10	Wildcard	October 14, 2017	Saturday 9:30 p.m.	7.5	
11	Top 10 Redux	October 21, 2017	Saturday 9:30 p.m.	6.8	
12	Top 9 Redux	November 4, 2017	Saturday 9:30 p.m.	9.3	
13	Top 8 Redux	November 11, 2017	Saturday 9:30 p.m.	9.2	
14	Top 7	November 18, 2017	Saturday 9:30 p.m.	9.1	
15	Top 6	November 25, 2017	Saturday 9:30 p.m.	9.1	
16	Top 5	December 2, 2017	Saturday 9:30 p.m.	8.8	
17	Top 4	December 9, 2017	Saturday 9:30 p.m.	9.1	
18	Winner announced	December 16, 2017	Saturday 9:30 p.m.	9.4	

- In 2017, each point represents 245.700 households in 15 market cities in Brazil (70.500 households in São Paulo).
