= Junior Bake Off Brasil =

- Genre: Cooking; Baking; Reality
- Based on: Junior Bake Off
- Presented by: Nadja Haddad; Carol Fiorentino; Ticiana Villas Boas
- Judges: Beca Milano; Olivier Anquier; Carol Fiorentino; Fabrizio Fasano Jr.
- Narrated by: Carol Fiorentino
- Country of origin: Brazil
- No. of seasons: 3
- No. of episodes: 24

Production
- Production locations: São Paulo, São Paulo
- Camera setup: Multiple-camera
- Running time: 120 minutes

Original release
- Network: SBT
- Release: January 6, 2018 – March 28, 2020

Related
- Bake Off Brasil; Bake Off SBT; Bake Off Celebridades

Junior Bake Off Brasil is a Brazilian reality television competition spin-off from the main series Bake Off Brasil featuring children from ages 8 to 13.

The series premiered on Saturday, January 6, 2018, at 9:30 p.m. (BRT / AMT) on SBT, aiming to find the best junior baker in Brazil.

== Host and judges ==
The series was presented by Carol Fiorentino and judged by Fabrizio Fasano Jr. and Beca Milano. However, following production of the first season, Carol and Fasano left the show over contract disputes. Carol was replaced by Nadja Haddad in season two. Beca returned as judge and was joined by Olivier Anquier.

Key
Host
Judge

Cast member	Seasons		
Cast member	1	2	3
Carol Fiorentino			
Nadja Haddad			
Fabrizio Fasano Jr.			
Beca Milano			
Olivier Anquier			

== Series overview ==
Season	No. of bakers	No. of weeks	Winner	Runner-up
1	16	10	Arthur Gonzaga	Duda Silveira
2	12	7	Gigi Bordezan	Fred Francavilla
3	12	7	David Caldeira	Anita Freire

== Ratings and reception ==
Season	Timeslot (BRT)	Premiered		Ended		TV season	SP viewers (in points)	Source
Season	Timeslot (BRT)	Date	Viewers (in points)	Date	Viewers (in points)	TV season	SP viewers (in points)	Source
1	Saturday 9:30 p.m.	January 6, 2018	8.4	March 10, 2018	6.8	2018	7.34	
2	Saturday 10:30 p.m.	February 16, 2019	9.9	March 30, 2019	9.7	2019	9.34	
3	Saturday 10:30 p.m.	February 15, 2020	7.8	March 28, 2020	7.6	2020	7.60	

- Each point represents a specific number of households in São Paulo.
  - 2018: 71.855 households.
  - 2019: 73.015 households.
  - 2020: 74.987 households.
