= Grund (surname) =

Grund is a German and Scandinavian surname. Notable people with the surname include:

- Annelie Grund (born 1953), German artist
- Arlindo Grund (born 1974), Brazilian television presenter
- Cynthia M. Grund (born 1956), American philosopher and educator
- Francis Grund (1805–1863), German-born American journalist and author
- Friedrich Wilhelm Grund (1791–1874), German composer, conductor and teacher
- Jan Grund (born 1946), Norwegian academic
- Johann Gottfried Grund (1733–1796), German-Danish sculptor
- Johanna Grund (1934–2017), German journalist, writer and politician
- Kevin Grund (born 1987), German footballer
- Manfred Grund (born 1955), German politician
- Norbert Grund (1717–1767), Czech painter
- Sámal Petur í Grund (born 1958), Faroese politician

== See also ==
- Friedl Behn-Grund (1906–1989), German cinematographer
- Madeleine Grundström (born 1980), Swedish handball goalkeeper
