= Bake Off Brasil season 9 =

Bake Off Brasil
- Season 9
- Presented by: Nadja Haddad
- Judges: Beca Milano; Giuseppe Gerundino
- No. of contestants: 18
- Winner: Marcel
- Runner-up: Fabiano
- No. of episodes: 19

Release
- Original network: SBT; Discovery Home & Health
- Original release: August 12 – December 23, 2023

Season chronology
- ← Previous; Season 8 Next → Season 10

The ninth season of Bake Off Brasil premiered on August 12, 2023, at 10:30 p.m. on SBT.

Beca Milano and Giuseppe Gerundino returned as judges and Nadja Haddad returned as the host.

== Bakers ==
It featured a returning contestant: Emilly Graziela (from Bake Off Brasil 8).

The following is a list of contestants:

Baker	Age	Occupation	Hometown	Status	Star Baker	Finish
Santiago Junior	33	Designer	Fortaleza	Eliminated 1st	0	18th
Creuza Lima	35	Housewife	Mãe d'Água	Withdrew	0	17th
Rhaina Mendes	25	Child entertainer	Guarulhos	Eliminated 2nd	0	16th
Natália Polli	30	Personal stylist	Jundiaí	Eliminated 3rd	0	15th
Tábita Juliéte	27	Artisan	Guarulhos	Eliminated 4th	0	14th
Cássia Siqueira	37	Model	Santos	Eliminated 5th	0	13th
Samuel Nolasco	25	Chef	Belo Horizonte	Eliminated 6th	0	12th
Flávio Savi	35	Banker	Ribeirão Preto	Eliminated 7th	0	11th
Layon Souza	19	Student	São Paulo	Eliminated 8th	0	10th
Emilly Graziela	26	Hospital attendant	São Paulo	Eliminated 9th	0	Returned
Lidia Cardoso	28	Photographer	Campinas	Eliminated 10th	1	Returned
Luan Gomes	28	Car electrician	Nilópolis	Eliminated 11th	2	Returned
Lidia Cardoso	28	Photographer	Campinas	Eliminated 12th	1	9th
Daniela Oliveira	28	Digital influencer	Guarani	Eliminated 13th	0	8th
Emilly Graziela	26	Hospital attendant	São Paulo	Eliminated 14th	0	7th
Maria Inêz	41	Teacher	Niterói	Eliminated 15th	1	6th
Joaquim Matheus	26	Dance teacher	Seropédica	Eliminated 16th	5	5th
Yorran Salomão	20	Content creator	Castanhal	Eliminated 17th	0	4th
Luan Gomes	28	Car electrician	Nilópolis	Eliminated 18th	2	3rd
Fabiano Miranda	40	Farmer	Uberaba	Runner-up	1	2nd
Marcel Toni	41	Flight attendant	São Paulo	Winner	6	1st

== Results summary ==
Elimination chart
Baker	1	2	3	4	5	6	7	8	9	10	11	12	13	14	15	16	17	18	19
Marcel		SB				SB							SB				SB		WIN
Fabiano			SB																OUT
Luan	SB								SB		OUT	RET							OUT
Yorran																		OUT	
Joaquim				SB				SB			SB					SB	OUT		
Maria Inêz										SB						OUT			
Emilly									OUT			RET			OUT				
Daniela														OUT					
Lidia							SB			OUT		RET	OUT						
Layon								OUT											
Flávio							OUT												
Samuel						OUT													
Cássia					OUT														
Tábita				OUT															
Natália			OUT																
Rhaina		OUT																	
Creuza		WDR																	
Santiago	OUT																		

Key

Winner
Runner-up

Star Baker
Judges' favourite bakers
Advanced
Judges' bottom bakers
Eliminated
Returned

=== Technical challenges ranking ===
Baker	1	2	3	4	5	6	7	8	9	10	11	12	13	14	15	16	17	18	19
Marcel	5th	1st	6th	2nd	3rd	1st	8th	10th	1st	5th	4th		1st	2nd	2nd	2nd	1st	1st	1st
Fabiano	2nd	4th	1st	8th	5th	3rd	7th	3rd	3rd	3rd	6th		9th	7th	4th	5th	4th	2nd	2nd
Luan	3rd	5th	7th	4th	2nd	8th	6th	2nd	2nd	6th	7th	1st	7th	5th	3rd	4th	3rd	4th	3rd
Yorran	6th	7th	3rd	13th	4th	4th	4th	6th	4th	2nd	3rd		2nd	4th	1st	3rd	2nd	3rd	
Joaquim	1st	2nd	2nd	3rd	1st	5th	5th	1st	8th	7th	2nd		5th	3rd	7th	1st	5th		
Maria Inêz	4th	11th	9th	14th	6th	7th	3rd	5th	5th	1st	5th		4th	6th	5th	6th			
Emilly	7th	6th	4th	5th	10th	11th	10th	9th	9th			2nd	3rd	1st	6th				
Daniela	8th	3rd	5th	6th	9th	2nd	9th	4th	6th	4th	1st		6th	8th					
Lidia	9th	10th	14th	9th	11th	9th	2nd	8th	7th	8th		—	8th						
Layon	12th	8th	11th	7th	7th	6th	1st	7th				3rd							
Flávio	10th	13th	10th	1st	8th	10th	11th					9th							
Samuel	16th	12th	13th	10th	12th	12th						7th							
Cássia	15th	15th	8th	11th	13th							8th							
Tábita	13th	14th	12th	12th								5th							
Natália	14th	9th	15th									4th							
Rhaina	11th	16th										10th							
Creuza	17th	–										6th							
Santiago	18th																		

Key
Star Baker
Eliminated

== Ratings and reception ==
=== Brazilian ratings ===
All numbers are in points and provided by Kantar Ibope Media.

Episode	Air date	Timeslot (BRT)	SP viewers (in points)	Source
1	August 12, 2023	Saturday 10:30 p.m.	3.7	
2	August 19, 2023	Saturday 10:30 p.m.		
3	August 26, 2023	Saturday 10:30 p.m.		
4	September 2, 2023	Saturday 10:30 p.m.		

- In 2023, each point represents 268.083 households in 15 market cities in Brazil (76.953 households in São Paulo).
