= Junior Bake Off Brasil season 1 =

Junior Bake Off Brasil
- Season 1
- Presented by: Carol Fiorentino
- Judges: Beca Milano; Fabrizio Fasano Jr.
- No. of contestants: 16
- Winner: Arthur
- Runner-up: Duda
- No. of episodes: 10

Release
- Original network: SBT
- Original release: January 6 – March 10, 2018

Season chronology
- Next → Season 2

The first season of Junior Bake Off Brasil premiered on January 6, 2018 at 9:30 p.m. on SBT.

== Bakers ==
The following is a list of contestants:

Baker	Age	Hometown	Status	Finish
Manu Mariano	10	Belo Horizonte	Eliminated 1st	15th 16th
Sophia Correia	11	Santo André	Eliminated 1st	15th 16th
Giulia Bele Fusco	11	São Bernardo do Campo	Withdrew	14th
Arthur Gonzaga	12	Juiz de Fora	Eliminated 2nd	—
Lanai de Sá	11	Campo Grande	Eliminated 3rd	13th 12th
Romeo Vitor	10	São Paulo	Eliminated 3rd	13th 12th
Luiz Faustino	9	São Paulo	Eliminated 4th	11th
Thiago Edmar	8	São Paulo	Eliminated 4th	—
Leonardo Mazzola	12	São Paulo	Eliminated 5th	10th 9th
Thiago Nunes	8	São José do Rio Preto	Eliminated 5th	10th 9th
Isabella "Bella" Maciel	12	São Paulo	Eliminated 6th	8th 7th
Gustavo Almeida	10	São Paulo	Eliminated 6th	8th 7th
Catarina "Naná" Dutra	9	Rio de Janeiro	Eliminated 7th	6th 5th
Sarah Oliveira	8	Guarulhos	Eliminated 7th	6th 5th
Noah Marie Salzman	10	Santana de Parnaíba	Eliminated 8th	4th 3rd
Thales Moussalli	9	São Paulo	Eliminated 8th	4th 3rd
Eduarda "Duda" Silveira	9	São Bernardo do Campo	Runner-up	2nd
Arthur Gonzaga	12	Juiz de Fora	Winner	1st

== Results summary ==
Elimination chart
Baker	1	2	3	4	5	6	7	8	9	10
Arthur			OUT			RET		SB		WIN
Duda									SB	OUT
Noah					SB					OUT
Thales							SB			OUT
Naná									OUT	
Sarah		SB							OUT	
Bella			SB					OUT		
Gustavo				SB				OUT		
Leonardo							OUT			
Thiago					OUT	RET	OUT			
Luiz					OUT					
Lanai				OUT						
Romeo				OUT						
Giulia	SB		WD							
Manu		OUT								
Sophia		OUT								

Key
Advanced
Judges' favourite bakers
Star Baker
Withdrew
Eliminated
Judges' bottom bakers
Returned
Runner-up
Winner

== Ratings and reception ==
=== Brazilian ratings ===
All numbers are in points and provided by Kantar Ibope Media.

Episode	Title	Air date	Timeslot (BRT)	SP viewers (in points)	Source
1	Top 16 (1)	Saturday 9:30 p.m.	January 6, 2018	8.4	
2	Top 16 (2)	Saturday 9:30 p.m.	January 13, 2018	7.1	
3	Top 14	Saturday 9:30 p.m.	January 20, 2018	7.8	
4	Top 12	Saturday 9:30 p.m.	January 27, 2018	6.8	
5	Top 10	Saturday 9:30 p.m.	February 3, 2018	8.4	
6	Wildcard	Saturday 9:30 p.m.	February 10, 2018	7.6	
7	Top 10 Redux	Saturday 9:30 p.m.	February 17, 2018	7.2	
8	Top 8	Saturday 9:30 p.m.	February 24, 2018	6.1	
9	Top 6	Saturday 9:30 p.m.	March 3, 2018	7.2	
10	Winner announced	Saturday 9:30 p.m.	March 10, 2018	6.8	

- In 2018, each point represents 248.647 households in 15 market cities in Brazil (71.855 households in São Paulo).
