= Bake Off Brasil season 2 =

Bake Off Brasil
- Season 2
- Presented by: Ticiana Villas Boas
- Judges: Carol Fiorentino; Fabrizio Fasano Jr.
- No. of contestants: 14
- Winner: Camila
- Runner-up: Noemy
- No. of episodes: 15

Release
- Original network: SBT
- Original release: May 21 – August 27, 2016

Season chronology
- Next → Season 3

The second season of Bake Off Brasil premiered on May 21, 2016 at 9:30 p.m. on SBT.

== Results summary ==
Elimination chart
Baker	1	2	3	4	5	6	7	8	9	10	11	12	13	14	15
Camila		SB				SB	OUT	RET	SB		SB		SB		WIN
Noemy			SB				SB					SB			OUT
Marcos				SB											OUT
Juliana										SB				OUT	
Paula													OUT		
Lucas						OUT		RET				OUT			
Gabriela											OUT				
Tiago										OUT					
Helga									OUT						
Murilo					OUT										
Vivian	SB			OUT											
Luciano			OUT												
Tathianne		OUT													
Matheus	OUT														

Key
Advanced
Judges' favourite bakers
Star Baker
Eliminated
Judges' bottom bakers
Returned
Runner-up
Winner

=== Technical challenges ranking ===
Baker	1	2	3	4	5	6	7	8	9	10	11	12	13	14	15
Camila	13th	3rd	1st	7th	2nd	3rd	8th	—	1st	3rd	1st	4th	1st	2nd	1st
Noemy	3rd	2nd	4th	9th	7th	5th	1st		2nd	2nd	2nd	1st	2nd	3rd	1st
Marcos	5th	4th	10th	1st	4th	8th	5th		4th	4th	5th	2nd	3rd	4th	2nd
Juliana	6th	8th	2nd	8th	6th	4th	4th		9th	1st	3rd	5th	4th	1st	
Paula	8th	10th	7th	2nd	8th	1st	6th		6th	8th	4th	3rd	5th		
Lucas	11th	7th	8th	5th	1st	7th		1st	8th	6th	7th	6th			
Gabriela	7th	11th	3rd	3rd	5th	2nd	3rd		3rd	5th	6th				
Tiago	10th	5th	6th	4th	3rd	9th	7th		5th	7th					
Helga	14th	12th	5th	11th	10th	6th	2nd		7th						
Murilo	4th	1st	11th	10th	9th			5th							
Vivian	2nd	9th	9th	6th				4th							
Luciano	1st	6th	12th					3rd							
Tathianne	9th	13th						2nd							
Matheus	12th							6th							

Key
Star Baker
Eliminated

== Bakers ==
The following is a list of contestants:

Baker	Age	Occupation	Hometown	Status	Star Baker	Finish
Matheus Grandizol	30	Cruise waiter	Rio de Janeiro	Eliminated 1st	0	14th
Tathianne Lemos	42	Manicurist	Taboão da Serra	Eliminated 2nd	0	13th
Luciano Neves	32	Marketing analyst	Itapetininga	Eliminated 3rd	0	12th
Vivian Nhoncance	35	Publicist	Santos	Eliminated 4th	1	11th
Murilo Marques	26	Chemical engineer	Mauá	Eliminated 5th	0	10th
Lucas Fischer	27	Pedagogical coordinator	São Paulo	Eliminated 6th	0	—
Camila Poli	32	Student	Três Corações	Eliminated 7th	2	—
Helga Litz	60	administrator	São Paulo	Eliminated 8th	0	9th
Tiago Magane	32	Sommelier	São Paulo	Eliminated 9th	0	8th
Gabriela Freire	40	Journalist	Petrolina	Eliminated 10th	0	7th
Lucas Fischer	27	Pedagogical coordinator	São Paulo	Eliminated 11th	0	6th
Paula Jabur	25	Singer	Londrina	Eliminated 12th	0	5th
Juliana Jabur	48	Housewife	Londrina	Eliminated 13th	1	4th
Marcos Souza	26	Psychologist	São Paulo	Eliminated 14th	2	3rd
Noemy Caangi	56	Plastic artist	São Paulo	Runner-up	3	2nd
Camila Poli	32	Student	Três Corações	Winner	6	1st
