= HMS Diadem =

Five ships of the Royal Navy have borne the name HMS Diadem, after the diadem, a type of crown:

- HMS Diadem (1782) was a 64-gun third rate ship of the line launched in 1782. She became a troopship in 1798 and was broken up in 1832.
- HMS Diadem (1801) was a 14-gun sloop launched as Diadem in 1798 that the Admiralty purchased in 1801 and renamed HMS Falcon in 1802. The Admiralty sold her in 1816. Her buyers renamed her Duke of Wellington. She was wrecked at Batavia in 1820.
- HMS Diadem (1856) was a wooden screw frigate launched in 1856 and sold in 1875.
- HMS Diadem (1896) was a Diadem-class protected cruiser, launched in 1896 and sold in 1921.
- HMS Diadem (84) was a Dido-class light cruiser launched in 1942. The British Government sold her to the Pakistani Navy in 1956, who renamed her Babur in 1957 and Jahangir in 1982. She left service in 1985.

See also

- Diadem (ship)
