= Diadem (ship) =

Several merchant vessels have borne the name Diadem, after the Diadem, a type of crown:

- Diadem was launched in 1798 as a merchant vessel. The Admiralty purchased her in 1801, renamed her HMS Falcon in 1802, and sold her in 1816. Her buyers renamed her Duke of Wellington. She was wrecked at Batavia in 1820.
- Diadem (1800 ship) was a barque of 350 or 367 tons (bm), launched in 1800 by Chapman and Campion, Whitby, for Edward, Aaron, and Robert Chapman. She was sold to the British government in 1818. The year 1818 may be a transcription error for 1808 as that is the last year for which Diadem is listed in either Lloyd's Register or the Register of Shipping.
- Diadem (1802 ship) was a ship of 455 tons (bm) launched in 1802 by Chapman and Campion for Edward and Aaron Chapman, and Robert Campion, Whitby. Lloyd's List of 10 January 1834 reported that Diadem, Smith, master, was a total wreck.
- Diadem (1824 ship), of 157 tons (bm), was launched at Southampton. She traded with Malta. In 1826 Greek pirates plundered 15 British vessels. One of the vessels the pirates plundered was Diadem, Airth, master, as she was sailing from Malta to Smyrna. They took part of her cargo, ship's stores, and men's clothing. They also treated the captain and crew badly. The pirates' misticos stopped Diadem on 1 June 1826, in the Silote Passage.
- Diadem (1840 ship) was a barque of 398 tons (bm) (measuring 105'5"×25'6"×19'7") launched in 1840 by H. Barrick, Whitby, for Chapman, London. She left Gravesend on 18 December 1841 with 166 passengers that she delivered on 10 April 1842 at Port Leschenault, Western Australia.
- Diadem (1874 ship), a screw steamer built in 1874 in Newcastle and owned by Hall Brothers.
- SS Diadem (1906), of 3752 tons, was launched in 1906 by Richardson, Duck & Co., Stockton; on 23 February 1916 the German submarine U-38 sank Diadem as Diadem was sailing in ballast from Marseilles to Port Said.

== See also ==
- HMS Diadem
