= Bake Off Brasil season 10 =

Bake Off Brasil
- Season 10
- Presented by: Fabiana Karla
- Judges: Carole Crema; André Mifano
- No. of contestants: 18
- Winner: Eli
- Runner-up: Danilo
- No. of episodes: 19

Release
- Original network: Max; SBT; Discovery Home & Health
- Original release: August 10 – December 28, 2024

Season chronology
- ← Previous; Season 9

The tenth season of Bake Off Brasil was first released on August 5, 2024, on Max, premiering on SBT on August 10 at 8:45 p.m., with reruns starting on August 16 at 9:00 p.m. on Discovery Home & Health.

On January 24, 2024, judge Beca Milano left SBT, leading to rumors that the series was cancelled, which was initially confirmed by the network and host Nadja Haddad. However, on March 13, 2024, SBT reversed that decision and announced the production of the tenth season through an agreement with Warner Bros. Discovery, which helped reduce some production costs. Among the changes, Fabiana Karla was confirmed as the new host, with Carole Crema and André Mifano joining as the new judges for the season.

== Bakers ==
The following is a list of contestants:

Baker	Age	Occupation	Hometown	Status	Star Baker	Finish
Elizabete Fonseca	54	Saleswoman	Conselheiro Lafaiete	Eliminated 1st	0	18th
Alessandra Ibrahim	52	Hypnologist	Itapeva	Eliminated 2nd	0	17th
Itacira da Silva	27	Singer	Recife	Eliminated 3rd	0	16th
Adriele Rodrigues	33	Hairdresser	Itaboraí	Eliminated 4th	0	Returned
Luís Felipe Soares	21	Street vendor	Rio de Janeiro	Eliminated 5th	0	15th
Deivisson Ribeiro	33	Graphic designer	Serra	Eliminated 6th	0	14th
Martha Sakamoto	64	Retired	Penápolis	Eliminated 7th	0	13th
Thiago Barros	36	Bricklayer	Anajás	Eliminated 8th	0	12th
Guilherme Fonseca	26	Flight attendant	São Paulo	Eliminated 9th	0	Returned
Jean Lima	20	Student	São Paulo	Eliminated 10th	0	11th
Leonardo Almeida	41	Industrial designer	Rio de Janeiro	Eliminated 11th	0	10th
Sarah Costa	23	Architect	Maceió	Eliminated 12th	0	9th
Adriele Rodrigues	33	Hairdresser	Itaboraí	Eliminated 13th	0	8th
Maria Clara Rebello	28	Entrepreneur	Montes Claros	Eliminated 14th	0	7th
Raabe Linhares	27	Digital influencer	Natal	Eliminated 15th	1	6th
Guilherme Fonseca	26	Flight attendant	São Paulo	Eliminated 16th	0	5th
Fernanda Moreno	36	Cashier	São Luís	Eliminated 17th	4	4th
Juliano Faller	29	Waiter	Ampére	Eliminated 18th	4	3rd
Danilo Guerini	40	Industrial mechanic	Vitória	Runner-up	6	2nd
Eli Alencar	36	Babysitter	Juazeiro	Winner	1	1st

== Results summary ==
Elimination chart
Baker	1	2	3	4	5	6	7	8	9	10	11	12	13	14	15	16	17	18	19
Eli	SAFE	SAFE	LOW	SAFE	SAFE	SAFE	SAFE	SB	SAFE	HIGH		SAFE	SAFE	SAFE	HIGH	LOW	LOW	LOW	WIN
Danilo	SAFE	SB	HIGH	SB	SB	LOW	SB	HIGH	HIGH	SAFE		HIGH	LOW	SB	SB	HIGH	HIGH	HIGH	OUT
Juliano	SB	SAFE	HIGH	SAFE	HIGH	SAFE	HIGH	SAFE	SB	SB		SAFE	HIGH	HIGH	LOW	HIGH	SB	HIGH	OUT
Fernanda	HIGH	SAFE	SB	SAFE	HIGH	HIGH	SAFE	SAFE	HIGH	SAFE		SB	SB	LOW	SAFE	SB	LOW	OUT	
Guilherme	SAFE	HIGH	SAFE	SAFE	LOW	SAFE	HIGH	SAFE	OUT		RET	HIGH	SAFE	LOW	HIGH	SAFE	OUT		
Raabe	SAFE	LOW	SAFE	SAFE	HIGH	SB	SAFE	HIGH	LOW	SAFE		HIGH	HIGH	HIGH	SAFE	OUT			
Maria Clara	SAFE	SAFE	SAFE	LOW	SAFE	HIGH	SAFE	SAFE	SAFE	LOW		SAFE	SAFE	SAFE	OUT				
Adriele	SAFE	SAFE	SAFE	OUT							RET	LOW	LOW	OUT					
Sarah	SAFE	SAFE	SAFE	SAFE	SAFE	SAFE	SAFE	SAFE	LOW	HIGH		SAFE	OUT						
Leonardo	HIGH	SAFE	SAFE	HIGH	SAFE	SAFE	SAFE	LOW	SAFE	SAFE		OUT							
Jean	SAFE	HIGH	SAFE	SAFE	SAFE	SAFE	LOW	LOW	SAFE	OUT									
Thiago	SAFE	SAFE	SAFE	SAFE	SAFE	SAFE	SAFE	OUT											
Martha	LOW	SAFE	SAFE	SAFE	LOW	LOW	OUT												
Deivisson	SAFE	SAFE	SAFE	SAFE	SAFE	OUT													
Luís Felipe	LOW	SAFE	SAFE	HIGH	OUT														
Itacira	SAFE	SAFE	OUT																
Alessandra	SAFE	OUT																	
Elizabete	OUT																		

Key

Winner
Runner-up

Star Baker
Judges' favourite bakers
Judges' bottom bakers
Eliminated
Returned

=== Technical challenges ranking ===
Baker	1	2	3	4	5	6	7	8	9	10	11	12	13	14	15	16	17	18	19
Eli	7th	4th	14th	10th	12th	12th	9th	3rd	6th	3rd		8th	4th	4th	3rd	6th	3rd	4th	2nd
Danilo	5th	1st	1st	1st	5th	7th	2nd	1st	3rd	4th		2nd	9th	2nd	1st	3rd	1st	1st	1st
Juliano	1st	6th	2nd	5th	2nd	5th	1st	5th	2nd	1st		6th	2nd	1st	4th	1st	2nd	2nd	3rd
Fernanda	2nd	13th	3rd	6th	1st	2nd	4th	4th	1st	8th		5th	1st	6th	5th	2nd	4th	3rd	
Guilherme	15th	2nd	6th	9th	11th	6th	3rd	9th	10th		—	1st	7th	7th	2nd	4th	5th		
Raabe	16th	7th	9th	13th	3rd	1st	6th	2nd	9th	5th		3rd	3rd	3rd	6th	5th			
Maria Clara	9th	9th	12th	14th	4th	3rd	8th	8th	5th	6th		4th	5th	5th	7th				
Adriele	6th	12th	8th	15th							2nd	9th	6th	8th					
Sarah	12th	5th	4th	4th	8th	9th	7th	11th	7th	2nd		7th	8th						
Leonardo	3rd	17th	5th	3rd	6th	10th	10th	7th	8th	9th		10th							
Jean	13th	3rd	13th	12th	9th	8th	11th	6th	4th	7th	1st								
Thiago	4th	10th	10th	11th	7th	4th	5th	10th			5th								
Martha	18th	15th	11th	8th	13th	13th	12th				4th								
Deivisson	8th	11th	15th	7th	10th	11th					3rd								
Luís Felipe	14th	16th	7th	2nd	14th						7th								
Itacira	10th	14th	16th								9th								
Alessandra	11th	8th									8th								
Elizabete	17th										6th								

Key
Star Baker
Eliminated

== Ratings and reception ==
=== Brazilian ratings ===
All numbers are in points and provided by Kantar Ibope Media.

Episode	Air date	Timeslot (BRT)	SP viewers (in points)	Source
1	August 5, 2024 (Max); August 10, 2024 (SBT)	Saturday 8:45 p.m.	5.8	
2	August 12, 2024 (Max); August 24, 2024 (SBT)	Saturday 8:45 p.m.	4.3	
3	August 19, 2024 (Max); August 31, 2024 (SBT)	Saturday 8:45 p.m.	3.3	
4	August 26, 2024 (Max); September 7, 2024 (SBT)	Saturday 8:45 p.m.	3.7	
5	September 2, 2024 (Max); September 14, 2024 (SBT)	Saturday 8:45 p.m.	3.8	
6	September 9, 2024 (Max); September 21, 2024 (SBT)	Saturday 8:45 p.m.	3.5	
7	September 16, 2024 (Max); September 28, 2024 (SBT)	Saturday 8:45 p.m.	3.5	
8	September 23, 2024 (Max); October 5, 2024 (SBT)	Saturday 8:45 p.m.	3.7	
9	September 30, 2024 (Max); October 12, 2024 (SBT)	Saturday 8:45 p.m.	3.5	
10	October 7, 2024 (Max); October 19, 2024 (SBT)	Saturday 8:45 p.m.	4.0	
11	October 14, 2024 (Max); October 26, 2024 (SBT)	Saturday 8:45 p.m.	4.1	
12	October 21, 2024 (Max); November 2, 2024 (SBT)	Saturday 8:45 p.m.	4.6	
13	October 28, 2024 (Max); November 16, 2024 (SBT)	Saturday 8:45 p.m.	3.5	
14	November 11, 2024 (Max); November 23, 2024 (SBT)	Saturday 8:45 p.m.	3.8	
15	November 18, 2024 (Max); November 30, 2024 (SBT)	Saturday 8:45 p.m.	4.3	
16	November 25, 2024 (Max); December 7, 2024 (SBT)	Saturday 8:45 p.m.	3.5	
17	December 2, 2024 (Max); December 14, 2024 (SBT)	Saturday 8:45 p.m.	3.9	
18	December 9, 2024 (Max); December 21, 2024 (SBT)	Saturday 8:45 p.m.	3.8	
19	December 16, 2024 (Max); December 28, 2024 (SBT)	Saturday 8:45 p.m.	3.6	

- In 2024, each point represents 253.273 households in 15 market cities in Brazil (73.279 households in São Paulo).
