= Arlindo Grund =

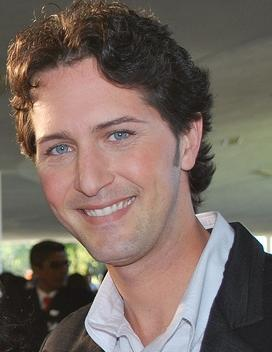
- Born: November 24, 1974 (age 50); Recife, Pernambuco, Brazil

Arlindo Grund (born November 24, 1974) is a Brazilian television presenter, fashion consultant, stylist and magazine editor.

== Biography ==
Arlindo Grund of Portuguese-English descent, was born in Recife, Pernambuco. He holds a degree in Communication from the Catholic University of Pernambuco, post-graduate in Marketing from Faculdade Getúlio Vargas and a master's degree from Universidade Federal Rural de Pernambuco.

== Filmography ==
=== Television ===
Year	Title	Activity	TV channel
2009–present	Esquadrão da Moda	Television presenter	SBT

== Book ==
Year	Title	Genre / Subgenre
2015	Nada Para Vestir	Moda e Design
