= Diadema =

Diadema is the term for diadem in most Romance languages, and in English may refer to:

- Diadema, São Paulo, a city in São Paulo state, Brazil
- Diadema (echinoderm), a genus of sea urchin belonging to the family Diadematidae
- Diadema (fungus), a genus of fungi in the family Diademaceae
- Damon diadema, a species of arachnid, sometimes known as the tailless whip scorpion
- Sinea diadema, a species of the assassin bug family, native to North America
