= Olivier Anquier =

Brazilian baker and television presenter

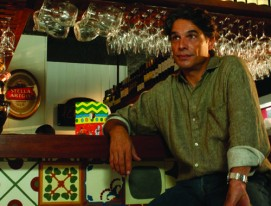
- Anquier in 2012
- Born: Olivier Noel Christian Anquier; 11 November 1959 (age 67); Paris, France
- Spouses: Débora Bloch (m. 1991; div. 2006) Adriana Alves (m. 2010)
- Children: 3
- Website: olivieranquier.com.br

Olivier Noel Christian Anquier (born November 11, 1959), better known as Olivier Anquier, is a French Brazilian chef, businessman and television presenter.

== Personal life ==
Anquier was born in Paris, France. He immigrated to Brazil in 1979 and became a naturalised Brazilian citizen in late 2007. Anquier was married for 15 years to actress Débora Bloch and had two children, Julia and Hugo. He is currently married to actress Adriana Alves. In addition to his work as a television host, he is also a businessman.

== Career ==
=== As television host ===
Anquier commanded the cooking table in the View All programs in 2005 and 2006, coordinated by Paulo Henrique Amorim, Sunday Spectacular in 2006, 2007 and 2008 called Diário do Olivier (Olivier's Diary). Later, in 2007, he had a cooking framework at Programa da Tarde (Afternoon Programme), also in Rede Record. He had tickets for Band and continues today with the Diário do Olivier programme and the reality show, Maids in Ação in the GNT.
