= Christina Rocha =

Brazilian journalist and TV presenter (born 1957)

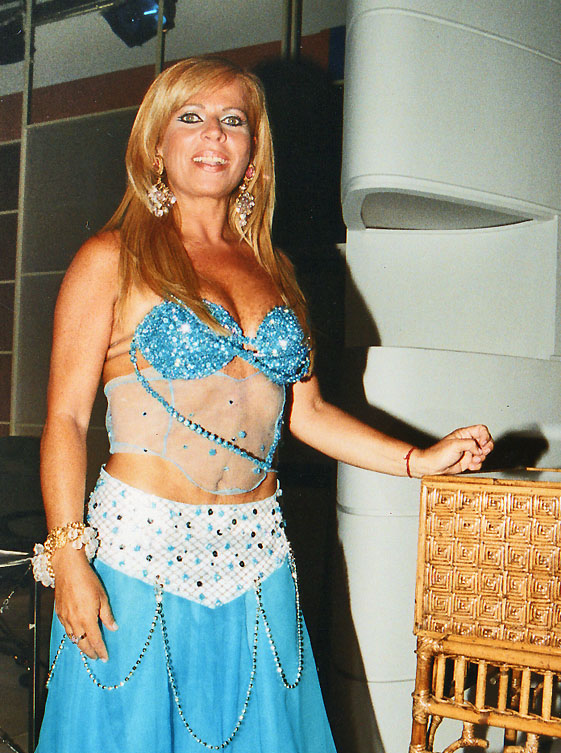
- Rocha in 2006
- Born: June 7, 1957 (age 69); Rio de Janeiro, Brazil
- Occupations: Journalist and TV presenter

Maria Christina Lima Corrêa da Rocha, better known as Christina Rocha (born June 7, 1957) is a Brazilian journalist and TV presenter. Between May 2009 and March 2023, she was the host of the program Casos de Família, on SBT. In 2024, she is the short-lived presenter of the news program Tá na Hora (It's Time) and she was the creator of the podcast Christina PodTudo, on YouTube. Today, she returns to SBT to present the new Casos de Família, which premieres again on July 28, 2025, at 2:45 PM.

== Career ==
Graduated in journalism from Faculdades Integradas Hélio Alonso, Christina became known as presenter of the program O Povo na TV (English: The People on TV), on the former TVS, now SBT, in 1982. It was an interview program on controversial and scandalous topics. It also featured artistic gossip and consumer protection panels. At the same time, she participated in several films from the Trapalhões sequence. Reports showed the complaints of badly served consumers, who were placed face to face with suppliers of services and products. The conversation often devolved into physical fights. It reached high ratings and even threatened Rede Globo at the time. Wilton Franco, Wagner Montes, Sérgio Mallandro and Roberto Jefferson also appeared as presenters.

The journalist would also present on the same television network the programs O Preço Certo (The Right Price) and Musicamp, alongside Wagner Montes. She was a reporter for Viva a Noite and presented the programs Show da Tarde, Sessão Premiada (Awarded Session), Programa Flávio Cavalcanti (Program Flávio Cavalcanti), TV Powww and was a judge on the Show de Calouros. In 1991 she presented Aqui Agora, together with other journalists, until 1996. In 1997 he also had a program called Alô, Christina on SBT, which was on the air until 1998. She also presented the Programa Livre, on Thursdays, between September 16 and December 30, 1999, integrating a rotation of five presenters due to the departure of Serginho Groisman from SBT to Rede Globo. Christina joined the rotation along with Ney Gonçalves Dias, Márcia Goldschmidt, Lu Barsoti and Otávio Mesquita.

Between January 8 and June 10, 2000, Christina presented the program Fantasia, along with Celso Portiolli and three other presenters, who, like her, also came from Programa Livre: Lu Barsoti, Márcia Goldschmidt and Otávio Mesquita. In May 2001, the journalist began to present, together with Clodovil Hernandes, Mulheres, in which she stayed until March 2002, when she gave up her place to Catia Fonseca, on TV Gazeta. The partnership between the two lasted only a few months due to disagreements between the presenters. Between 2003 and 2004, she presented a new version of the program Alô, Christina and Comando Record on Rádio Record. In 2006 she became a judge on the program O Melhor do Brasil (The Best of Brazil), with Márcio Garcia, on Rede Record (today RecordTV). In 2007, she presented the program Onde Está Você? (Where Are You?), on Rede Bandeirantes. In 2008, the journalist returns to SBT, where she presents the second season of Aqui Agora, along with other journalists. However, the new version of the program is short-lived and Christina is back off TV.

A few months later, in 2009, she was chosen as the new presenter of Casos de Família, replacing Regina Volpato, who did not renew with the broadcaster because she did not agree with the changes proposed by the broadcaster for the program. This new format acquired by SBT belongs to a production company in Venezuela. Also in 2009, she participated in the telenovela Vende-se um Véu de Noiva, as Eva, and in 2011, she participated in the special 30 Anos de Chaves, as Dona Clotilde. Christina Rocha was also an actress in films of Os Trapalhões.

On March 18, 2024, Christina took over the command of the newscast Tá na Hora (It's Time), alongside Marcão do Povo. Rocha presented it until April 5, being replaced in the following week by Márcia Dantas. On May, 2025, Christina agreed to return to SBT, a year after her dismissal, beginning her third stint on the channel with the relaunch of Casos de Família, which premieres on July 28.

== Works ==
=== Television ===
Year	Title	Role	TV station
1981–84	O Povo na TV (The People on TV)	Presenter	SBT
1984–86	O Preço Certo (The Right Price)	Presenter	SBT
1984–85	Show da Tarde (Show of the Afternoon)	Presenter	SBT
1986–88	Musicamp	Presenter	SBT
1986–90	Viva a Noite (Hail the Night)	Reporter	SBT
1987	TV Powww	Presenter	SBT
1988–90	Show de Calouros (Freshmen Show)	Judge	SBT
1991–96	Aqui Agora (Here Now)	Presenter	SBT
1997–98	Alô, Christina (Hello, Christina)	Presenter	SBT
1999	Programa Livre (Free Program)	Presenter	SBT
2000	Fantasia (Fantasy)	Presenter	SBT
2001–02	Mulheres (Women)	Presenter	TV Gazeta
2005–06	O Melhor do Brasil (The Best of Brazil)	Judge	Rede Record
2007–08	Onde Está Você? (Where Are You?)	Presenter	Band
2008	Aqui Agora (Here Now)	Presenter	SBT
2009–23; 2025–present	Casos de Família (Family Cases)	Presenter	SBT
2011	Eliana	Presenter	SBT
2013	Quem Convence Ganha Mais (Who Convinces Wins More)	Presenter	SBT
2024	Tá na Hora (It's Time)	Presenter	SBT

=== Movies ===
Year	Title	Character	Director
1978	Os Trapalhões na Guerra dos Planetas (The Bunglers in the War of the Planets)	Princesa Myrna	Adriano Stuart
1979	O Cinderelo Trapalhão (The Bungler Cinderello)	Sara	Adriano Stuart

=== Radio ===
Year	Title	Role	Radio station
2003-04	Alô, Christina (Hello, Christina)	Presenter	Rádio Record
2003-04	Comando Record (Command Record)	Presenter	Rádio Record
