= César Filho =

Brazilian journalist

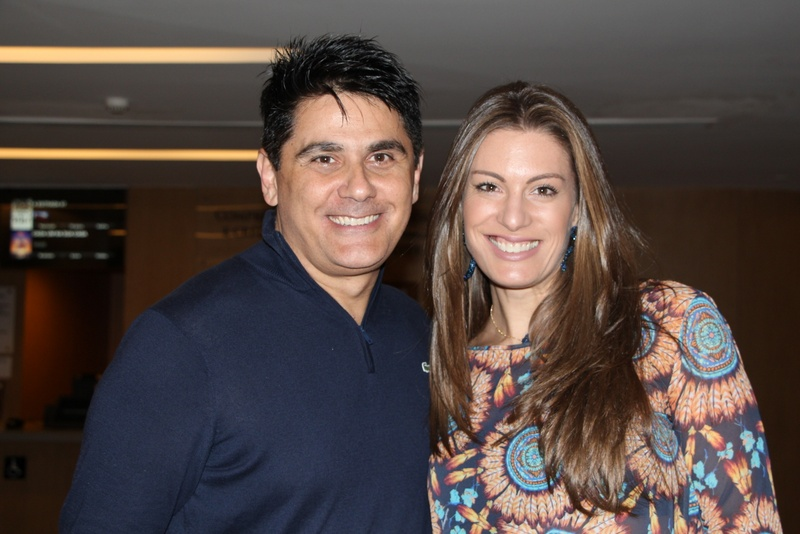
- César and his wife, Elaine Mickely, in 2015
- Born: Luiz Gonzaga César Filho; September 17, 1960 (age 66); Guaratinguetá, São Paulo, Brazil
- Occupations: Journalist, TV host and former actor
- Spouse: Elaine Mickely (m. 2000)
- Children: 2
- Website: Official website

Luiz Gonzaga César Filho (born September 17, 1960), better known as César Filho, is a Brazilian journalist, TV host and former actor. Between 2015 and 2023, César presented the program Hoje em Dia, on Record. Currently, he is the presenter of the newscast SBT Brasil. As a radio professional, in addition to Jovem Pan FM, César was presenter in the radios Bandeirantes, Record, Capital, Antena 1, América and 89 FM A Rádio Rock.

== Biography ==
Born in the inland of the state of São Paulo, César Filho moved to the capital of that state at the age of 9, together with his mother, Therezinha Sebbe César, and his two brothers, Reinaldo César (died in 2001) and Saulo de Tarso César. His father, Luiz Gonzaga César, was radio presenter in the city of Guaratinguetá.

== Career ==
César started his career in the sports department of TV Record, chiefed by Silvio Luiz. At the age of 16, he decides to follow the profession of his father and makes a test on the radio Jovem Pan, in which he is approved by Cândido Garcia to be the artistic name in his sports team. Late, called by Hélio Ansaldo, César returned to TV Record, this time, to present the newscast Record em Notícias. He also presented newscasts on Rede Bandeirantes - O Repórter, alongside William Bonner and Ângela Rodrigues Alves, created by Walter Clark, and on TV Cultura, before being hired by TV Globo. In the station, over the direction of Nilton Travesso, César passes to present TV Mulher, alongside Amália Rocha.

The program still counted with the participations of the couturier Ney Galvão, the aesthetic consultant Ala Szerman, the psicanalist Eduardo Mascarenhas, in the second phase of the program, that already counted with names like the sexologist Marta Suplicy, Clodovil Hernandes and Marília Gabriela. César presented also the programs Fantástico and, also with great success, the special 20 Anos Trapalhões - Criança Esperança (20 Years Trapalhões - Hope Children) and the musical Globo de Ouro. Still on Rede Globo, César did his debut in the teledramaturgy, acting in the character of Túlio in the soap opera Hipertensão. He also participated of the miniseries La Mamma, with Dercy Gonçalves and of the telenovela Sassaricando. After years on Rede Globo, César was to the defunct Rede Manchete, where he acted in the soap opera Kananga do Japão, acting opposite with Christiane Torloni. Also on Rede Manchete, César presented the people program Almanaque, alongside Rosana Hermann and Tânia Rodrigues. After some time away of the acting, César debuted on SBT in 1990, in the series Alô, Doçura! alongside Virgínia Novick. In 1998, he participated of the movie Uma Aventura do Zico (A Zico's Adventure).

In 2005, after twelve years away of the television, César signed with SBT and, on February 26, 2006, he debuted presenting Ver para Crer. On April, he took over SBT Repórter, replacing Hernano Henning, where he stayed by seven years. In 2007, he passed to present the newscast SBT Brasil at Saturdays and holidays and, in 2008, he was invited to take over Aqui Agora, alongside Analice Nicolau, aiming to improve the audience, however the journalistic had been cancelled months later. In 2010, César presented Boletim de Ocorrências for one month. In 2012, he passed to present SBT Manhã - 2ª Edição, a second version of the newscast that was presented live. On July 9, 2014, it was replaced by Notícias da Manhã (Morning News), in addition beginning at 5 AM. On November 3, César signs with Record, allegning that the working hour in his old station was causing him health problems. After César's exit, Notícias da Manhã lost half of its duration and was cancelled later. Originally, César would take over the reality show Power Couple Brasil, but he asked to be reallocated to a program that wouldn't be seasonal. On January 12, 2015, César took over Hoje em Dia, with the restructuring of the program, over the proposal of inserting more journalism in the program.

On December 22, 2023, César left Hoje em Dia and ended his contract with Record after nine years. On January 2, 2024, he returned to SBT to present the present the newscast SBT Brasil, replacing Marcelo Torres and Márcia Dantas.

== Personal life ==
In 1989, César started to date the TV presenter Angélica, that was 15 years old in that time, while he was 28 years old. The relationship only was revealed publicly in 1991, when she turned 18, avoiding the sensationalism of the press. The presenter revealed that had lost the virginity with César when she turned the majority. In 1995, both got engaged, marking the matrimony to December of that year. However, in 1996, the relationship had ended after seven years. In 1999, César started to date the actress Elaine Mickely, with whom he married on February 4, 2000. On August 1, 2000, his first daughter, Luma, was born. On December 7, 2003, his second son, Luigi, was born. He is a São Paulo FC fan.

== Works ==
=== Television ===
Year	Title	Role / Character	Note	TV station
1981	Record em Notícias	Reporter		Record
1982–83	O Repórter	Reporter		TV Cultura
1983	Jornal da Cultura	Presenter		TV Cultura
1984–86	TV Mulher	Presenter		TV Globo
1985–89	Fantástico	Presenter		TV Globo
1986	Hipertensão	Túlio		TV Globo
1987–89	Globo de Ouro	Presenter		TV Globo
1987	Sassaricando	Ciro Antônio	Episode: "November 9"	TV Globo
1988	Caso Especial	Marcos	Episode: "Garota da Capa" (The Girl of The Cover)	TV Globo
1989	Kananga do Japão	Afonso Carvalho		Rede Manchete
1990	Alô, Doçura!	Several characters		SBT
1990	La Mamma	Manfredo Antônio		TV Globo
1991–95	Almanaque	Presenter		Rede Manchete
2006–07	Ver para Crer	Presenter		SBT
2006–13	SBT Repórter	Presenter		SBT
2008	Aqui Agora	Presenter		SBT
2010	Boletim de Ocorrências	Presenter		SBT
2012–14	SBT Manhã	Presenter		SBT
2014	Noticias da Manhã	Presenter		SBT
2015–23	Hoje em Dia	Presenter		Record
2019–23	Aeroporto: Área Restrita	Presenter		Record
2024–present	SBT Brasil	Presenter		SBT

=== Movies ===
Year	Title	Character
1998	Uma Aventura do Zico (A Zico's Adventure)	Gabriel

=== Radio ===
Year	Title	Role	Radio station
1981–82	Pan Esportes	Presenter	Jovem Pan FM
1992–95	Jornal Capital	Presenter	Rádio Capital
1995–96	News	Presenter	Rádio América
1996–98	As Melhores	Presenter	Antena 1
1998–01	Jornal da Manhã	Presenter	Rádio Record
2001	Pool	Presenter	89 FM A Rádio Rock
2002–05	César Filho Apresenta (César Filho Presents)	Presenter	Rádio Bandeirantes

== Awards and nominations ==
Year	Award	Category	Work	Result	Ref.
2014	Prêmio F5	Man Presenter (news/sports)	Notícias da Manhã	Nominated	
