= Ney Gonçalves Dias =

Brazilian journalist

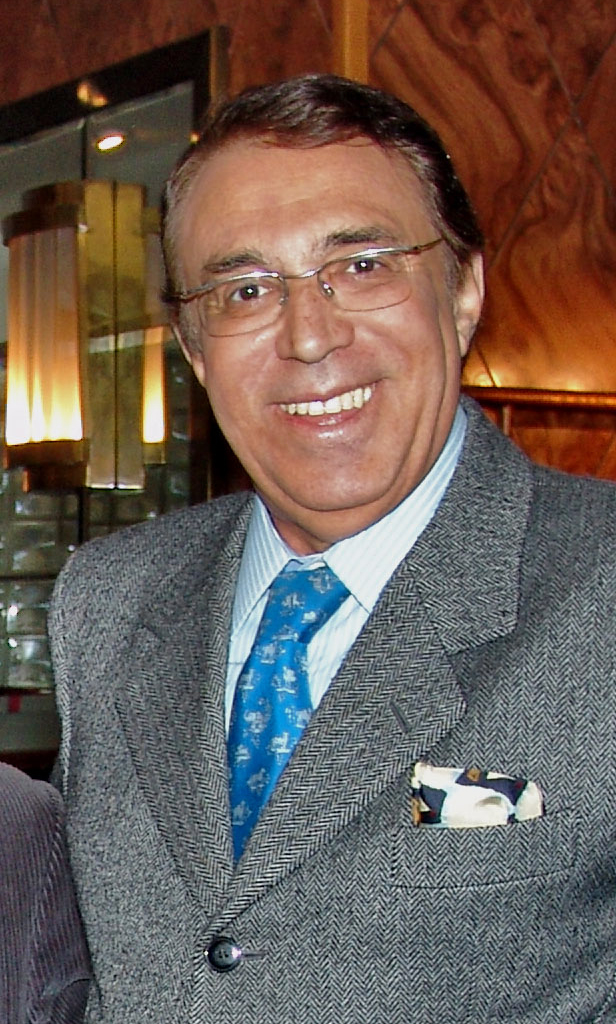
- Born: August 8, 1940 (age 86); Serrania, Minas Gerais, Brazil
- Occupation: Journalist

Ney Gonçalves Dias (born August 8, 1940) is a Brazilian journalist.

== Biography and career ==
Ney started his career in the 1960s, when he presented a program on TV Cultura. In the 1970s, he was an anchor on the radio Jovem Pan, presenting the newscasts Jornal da Integração Nacional and Jornal da Manhã. Ney is proud to interview Chico Xavier for Fantástico. He also spent time at Rede Excelsior and Rede Tupi in charge of Pinga-Fogo.

In 1980, at Boni's invitation, he became nationally known when he worked at TV Globo, on the TV Mulher program, alongside the then sexologist Marta Suplicy, the well-known journalist Marília Gabriela and the then fashion designer Clodovil. Ney is remembered due to the table falling during a program in 1983, which was repeated several times. Ney also presented the program O Povo e o Presidente. Ney stayed at Globo until 1984, when the network underwent a reformulation and transferred to TV Manchete. At the end of the 1980s, he worked at Rede Bandeirantes, where he got his talk show and also presented the newspaper Bandeira 1. He went to Record in 1991. In 1995, he was the anchor of the then-new Cidade Alerta until 1996, when he was replaced by João Leite Neto, and returned for a short period in 2002, after José Luiz Datena left the program.

In 1997, Ney worked at SBT, where he anchored the news program Aqui Agora, already in its final years. On the channel, he also ran Notícias do Dia, a late night newscast, and ran an interview panel on SBT Notícias, both at a time when the network's journalism was in decline.

Also on SBT, he presented Programa Livre, on Mondays, between September 13 and December 27, 1999, as one of five rotating presenters replacing Serginho Groisman, together with Márcia Goldschmidt, Lu Barsoti, Christina Rocha and Otávio Mesquita. In 2002 he left Record where he presented the newscast Cidade Alerta for a short period and the program Questão de Opinião. He went to RedeTV!, to present the women's show Bom Dia Mulher. In 2004, he took over the police news program Repórter Cidadão, on the same station. He also worked at CNT, TV da Gente where he co-presented Encontro da Gente alongside Adyel Silva. and TV JB. Since 2008, Ney has been with Rede Brasil and TVSC.
