= Analice Nicolau =

Brazilian journalist

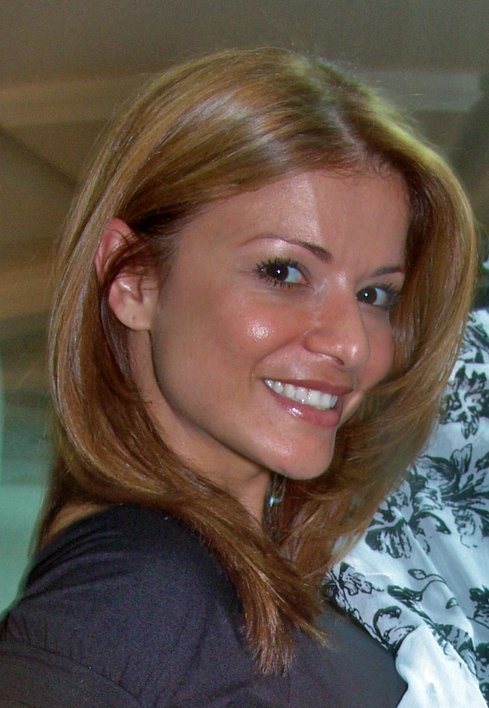
- Analice in 2007.
- Born: Ana Alice Nicolau; September 6, 1977 (age 49); Blumenau, Santa Catarina, Brazil
- Occupations: Journalist and former fashion model

Ana Alice Nicolau, better known as Analice Nicolau (born September 6, 1977), is a Brazilian journalist and former fashion model.

== Career ==
=== 1997–2002: fashion model ===
In 1997, when she was still living in Blumenau, she was invited by a scout from a modeling agency to do a catwalk and photo test. After approval, she began to carry out advertising campaigns and parades in the Southern Region of Brazil. In 1998, she participated in the Miss Blumenau contest. Part of the money she earned from modeling was donated to a charity that her family supported.

Due to her lolita image, she was compared to the Hungarian actress Cicciolina, an icon of global sensuality during the 1980s. In 2000, she participated in the selections that would choose a model to become the new Playmate, in the United States, whose godmother would be the actress Pamela Anderson, but ended up not winning the position.

In 2002, she was invited to participate in the second edition of the reality show Casa dos Artistas. Still in 2002, she launched the brand My Style Fitness, specializing in sportswear, which debuted during Santa Catarina Fashion Week, but a few months later Analice sold the brand to focus on journalism.

=== 2003–present: journalist ===
In 2003, she signed a contract with SBT after being invited along with Cynthia Benini by Silvio Santos to become anchor of Jornal do SBT – 1ª Edição, an earlier version of the consolidated Jornal do SBT, which was shown at midnight. In 2005, Analice, still together with Cynthia, were moved to SBT Notícias Breves, news bulletins shown five times throughout the morning and afternoon with a summary of the day's news, which was nicknamed Jornal das Pernas (from Portuguese: Newscast of the Legs), once that the journalists stood on a glass bench dressed in miniskirts – an idea from Silvio Santos himself to try to boost the audience. The newspaper was only available for a few months due to criticism of the format.

In 2006, she covered the Golden Globes live.

In 2007, after a period of restructuring her appearance and starting journalism school to gain more credibility, she debuted as an anchor for SBT Manhã alongside Hermano Henning. At the time, the press revealed that Analice was harassed by reporters from the network who were seeking the position, because she had not yet graduated.

In 2008, she was invited to present the police news program Aqui Agora with César Filho and Luiz Bacci, combining the two sides. Furthermore, on several occasions, she was an occasional presenter for Jornal do SBT and SBT Brasil, covering vacations and leaves of absence for other journalists. In May 2013, after six years as an anchor at SBT Manhã, she asked to leave the bench after being diagnosed with panic syndrome due to work overload. On September 10, even in the midst of treatment, she was fired from the station, but two weeks later, Silvio Santos ordered her to be rehired upon learning of what had happened. Analice asked for a lighter workload while she was undergoing treatment and was reassigned to Boletim Jornal do SBT, which went on air during breaks in the evening programs with bulletins of what would be shown in its entirety in the main newscast. In 2015, she was transferred to weather forecasting at SBT Brasil.

In 2016, already stabilized from panic syndrome, she took over the bench at Jornal do SBT, which in 2017 changed its name to SBT Notícias. In November 2019, she took over SBT Brasil during Rachel Sheherazade's medical leave, but upon her return in December she ended up being dismissed from the broadcaster.

Since 2021, she has been a columnist for Jornal de Brasília.

== Personal life ==
Nicolau is the daughter of a seamstress and a driver. During her adolescence, she dreamed of being an Olympic athlete, but she never achieved that dream.

In 2003, Nicolau began dating the lawyer and businessman Otávio Minoto, whom she married in 2007. The couple separated in 2011 and had no children.

In 2007, Nicolau joined the journalism course at the Armando Álvares Penteado Foundation, graduating in 2010.
