= Regina Volpato =

Brazilian television presenter

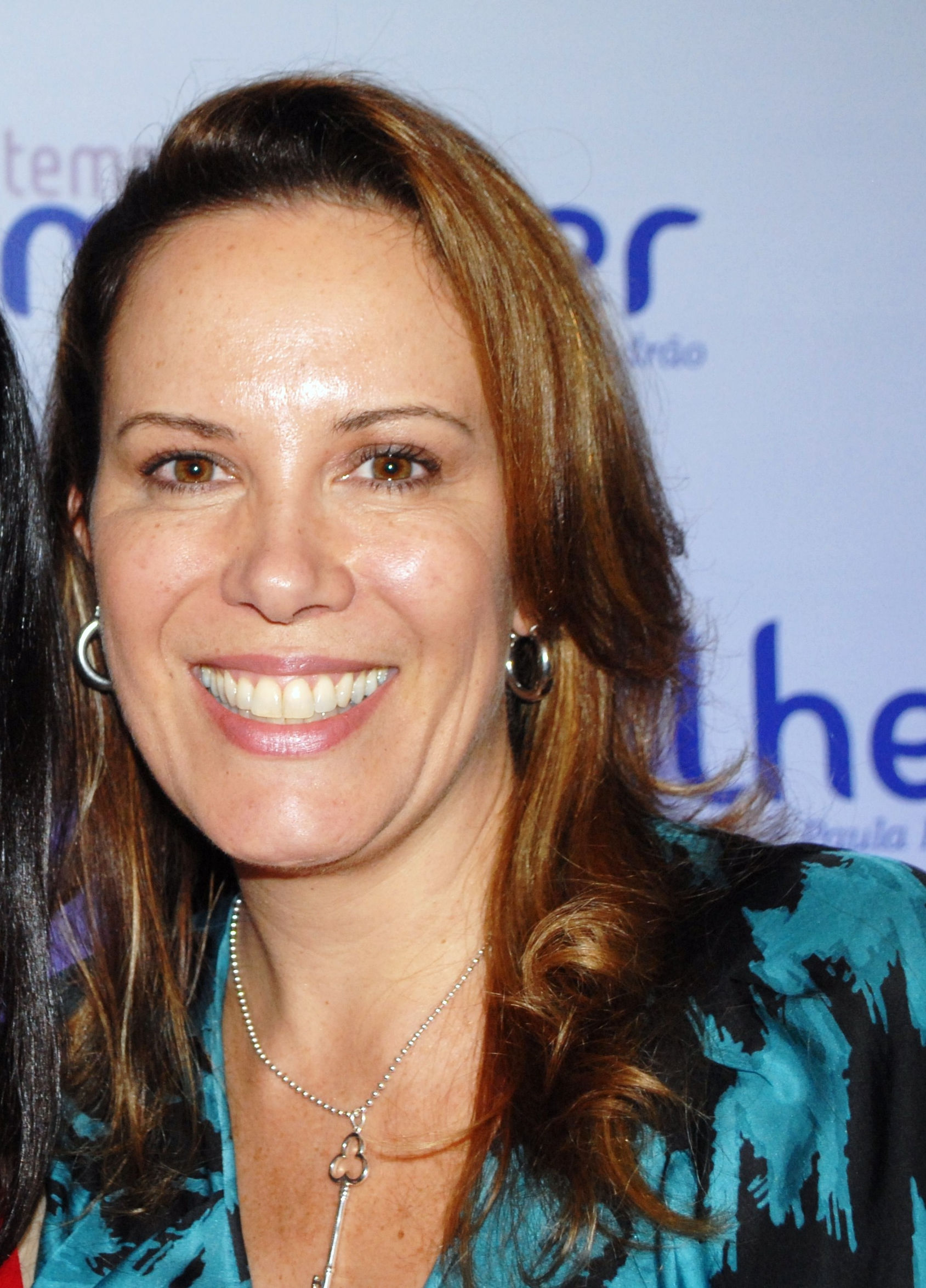
- Volpato in 2013
- Born: March 6, 1968 (age 58); São José do Rio Preto, São Paulo, Brazil
- Occupations: Journalist, writer and television presenter
- Children: 1
- Website: http://www.reginavolpato.com.br/

Regina Paula Volpato Rennó, best known as Regina Volpato (born March 6, 1968), is a Brazilian journalist, writer and television presenter.

== Biography and career ==
Volpato graduated in Social Communication with specialization in Public Relations at the School of Communication and Arts (ECA) at USP in 1989.

In 1990, Regina began her career at the Roberto Marinho Foundation as a journalist.

In 1998, she was hired by Band as a reporter. In 2001, with the foundation of the BandNews channel, she migrated to the new station, where she became a presenter of the nightly newscast.

In 2004, she gained national prominence when she was hired as the presenter of the first phase of Casos de Família, in SBT. In 2009, she decided to leave the station for being against the reformulation that the program would undergo, changing the tone of family debate with the help of psychologists, without hysteria, to a format considered more "sensationalist" by the press, using the history of families in a more exposed way. and with no intention of solving them (scandal style).

On July 28, 2011, she signed a contract with RedeTV!, where she presented Manhã Maior alongside Daniela Albuquerque until 2012. Between 2012 and 2013 she commanded the journalistic Se Liga Brasil, shown every morning by the same channel.

In 2016, the journalist created a YouTube channel entitled Regina Volpato, where she publishes the weekly segment "Prazer, eu sou", where she interviews authentic, original, nonconformist, humorous, audacious people; who have achieved or are dedicated to the pursuit of empowerment.

In 2017, she released her first book of chronicles, called Mudar Faz Bem (Change Is Good).

In December 2017, she was hired by TV Gazeta to cover Catia Fonseca's vacation from the Mulheres program from January 8, 2018. In February, due to Catia's move to Band and also to the good results she obtained in charge of the attraction during her provisional contract, Regina was officially made effective as the titular presenter of Mulheres. When announcing his hiring, TV Gazeta also communicated that the attraction will undergo reformulations.

== Personal life ==
She was married and is currently single. She has a daughter named Rafaela Volpato.
