= TV Alterosa Leste =

TV Alterosa Leste (ZYA 771)
- Governador Valadares/Manhuaçu, Minas Gerais; Brazil
- Channels: Digital: 38 (UHF); Virtual: 27

Programming
- Affiliations: SBT

Ownership
- Owner: Diários Associados; (TV Studios de Teófilo Otoni Ltda.)

History
- Founded: 1 August 2011
- Former channel numbers: Analog: 27 (UHF, 2011-2023)

Technical information
- Licensing authority: ANATEL
- ERP: 0.5 KW
- Transmitter coordinates: 20°15′6.1″S 42°2′34.6″W

Links
- Public license information: Profile
- Website: www.alterosa.com.br

TV Alterosa Leste (channel 27) is an SBT-affiliated television station licensed to Manhuaçu, but headquartered in the adjacent city of Governador Valadares. The station covers over 125 municipalities in the eastern side of Minas Gerais.

== History ==
The license for UHF channel 27 in Manhuaçu was granted by president Fernando Henrique Cardoso on 15 July 2002, as a result of a public contest won by TV Studios de Teófilo Otoni Ltda., licensed to businessman Silvio Vartan Kouyomdjian, who at the time was the director of operations at Grupo Silvio Santos. In 2008, 50% of the shares were acquired by Silvio Santos, who, facing a loss of affiliates and market share to Rede Record, decided to set up new stations. The same firm was subsequently used by SBT to use it for a later bid in São José dos Campos, São Paulo, which would become what is now TH+ SBT Vale.

With the license in hands, and facing problems following the crisis generated by the bankruptcy of Banco PanAmericano, SBT transferred its management in the station to Diários Associados, in charge of Rede Alterosa, network affiliate in Minas Gerais, which was preparing the installation of a new affiliate to cover the eastern portion of the state, up until then covered by its stations in Belo Horizonte and Juiz de Fora. The station invested R$4 million buying equipments and setting up its structure, which was divided between Manhuaçu and Governador Valadares, where the studios and commercial offices were installed.

The station started broadcasting at 7:30pm on 1 August 2011, with a ceremony held in Manhuaçu, city of license, where authorities such as mayor Adejair Barros, city council president Renato Cezar von Randow, local politician and businessmen, as well as priest Júlio Pessoa Franco, who blessed the facilities, were present. Its broadcasts started with a special message recorded by presenter Celso Portiolli, and then, it aired SBT Brasil, owhere the new affiliate was presented to national viewers via a link made by reporter Ana Cristina. In addition to UHF channel 27, the signal was mirrored on VHF channel 5, where TV Alterosa Belo Horizonte's relay station was available. Gradually, its signal expanded to other municipalities of the Vale do Aço, Vale do Rio Doce, Vale do Mucuri regions in full and parts of Vale do Jequitinhonha e Zona da Mata, reaching 125 municipalities.

== Technical information ==
Channel	Res.	Content
27.1	1080i	TV Alterosa Leste/SBT's main schedule
27.2	480i widescreen	TV Educação Governador Valadares

The station started its digital signal on 6 April 2017, on UHF channel 38, entirely in standard definition; conversion to high definition started on 14 June 2021, with networked programming, and finally, local programming converted to high definition on 14 February 2022.

The station activated its subchannel on 13 July 2020 in partnership with the municipality of Governador Valadares, as TV Educação, airing classes by television for students where they couldn't go to school due to the effects of the pandemic. On 22 February 2021, TV Alterosa Leste started dividing TV Educação with TV Leste, which was responsible for airing classes for sixth to ninth grade students and EJA (education for teens and adults), while Alterosa Leste continued airing classes from early education up until fifth grade.

The analog signal was due to close on 31 December 2023, per a 2016 ANATEL roadmap.
