= Universidade de Mogi das Cruzes =

Private university in Brazil

- Motto: Faça sua própria história.
- Motto in English: Make your own history.
- Established: 1962
- Students: 20,000
- Location: Mogi das Cruzes, São Paulo, Brazil
- Website: umc.br

The Universidade de Mogi das Cruzes (University of Mogi das Cruzes) is a university located in the municipality of Mogi das Cruzes in the state of São Paulo, Brazil.

The school was founded in 1962 and became a university in 1973. At present, the university has approximately 20,000 students at its two campuses, the original in Mogi das Cruzes, and the second in the Lapa district of the city of São Paulo.

== Alumni ==
- Luiz Bacci
