= Fantasia (TV program) =

Brazilian television program

- Genre: Game show
- Based on: Non è la Rai by Gianni Boncompagni
- Directed by: Paulo Santoro (seasons 1–3); Caco Rodrigues (season 4)
- Presented by: Adriana Colin (1997–1998); Débora Rodrigues (1997–1998); Jackeline Petkovic (1997–1998); Valéria Balbi (1997–1998); Amanda Françozo (1998); Tânia Mara (1998); Carla Perez (1998–1999); Celso Portiolli (2000); Márcia Goldschmidt (2000); Christina Rocha (2000); Otávio Mesquita (2000); Lu Barsoti (2000); Helen Ganzarolli (2007–2008); Caco Rodrigues (2007–2008); Luiz Bacci (2007)
- Opening theme: Fantasia no Ar
- Ending theme: Fantasia no Ar (reprise)
- Composer: Paulo de Carvalho
- Country of origin: Brazil
- Original language: Portuguese
- No. of seasons: 4

Production
- Running time: 120 minutes (1997–99); 360 minutes (2000–08)

Original release
- Network: SBT
- Release: 1 December 1997 – 17 March 2008

Fantasia was a Brazilian television program hosted by several female models on SBT. Based on the Italian television program Non è la Rai, it was an entertainment program in which people could participate in several games and earn money by phoning the program. It debuted on 1 December 1997 and ended on 17 March 2008. Many models from the program continued their career on TV.

== History of the program ==
=== First season (1997–1998) ===
The first season, which was the most successful one, debuted on 1 December 1997, at 4:30 pm. It was hosted by Adriana Colin, Débora Rodrigues, Jackeline Petkovic and Valéria Balbi, and directed by Paulo Santoro. In March 1998, Valéria Balbi left the program and the former dancers Amanda Françozo and Tânia Mara became hosts. The first season of the program ended on 15 August 1998. The official announcement of the cancellation of the program happened one day before its end. The reason why the program was canceled was that, since the month of April, the audience rate had been decreasing.

=== Second season (1998–1999) ===
On 1 November 1998, the program was back on Sundays, at 12:00 PM, and it was hosted by Carla Perez.

The program had some changes. The main change was the inclusion of musical attractions in addition to the games. Carla Perez also used to dance with her guests. The program was canceled again on 25 July 1999, due to low ratings, the program usually lose audiences to Planeta Xuxa and has low financial returns.

=== Third season (2000) ===
On 8 January 2000, the program is back on the schedule of SBT, on Saturdays, from 2:15 pm to 7:20 pm. It was hosted by Celso Portiolli, Márcia Goldschmidt, Christina Rocha, Otávio Mesquita and Lu Barsoti.

The program kept the same background and some of the dancers. It was canceled on 10 June 2000.

=== Fourth season (2007–2008) ===
On Tuesday, 30 October 2007, the program is back from 1:00 am to 3:00 am, being hosted by Helen Ganzarolli, Caco Rodrigues and Luiz Bacci. On the second day, Bacci had already left the program, which was then hosted only by Helen and Caco.

In the fourth season, the format remained similar to that of the previous seasons. The main changes were the reduction of the quantity of dancers (the number was reduced from 75 to 35 girls) and their clothes (in the three previous seasons, they wore shorts and colored shirts; in the fourth season, they wore bikinis).

Between 24 December and 12 January, due to Christmas and New Year seasons, the program ran in the afternoon, at 3:00 pm, and the length of the program was reduced to one hour. On 14 January the program started to run during the early hours of the day again, with its normal length of two hours.

On Monday, 10 March 2008, the program was back to the afternoon, starting at 2:00 pm. However, seven days later, the program was canceled.

The fourth season of the program started on Tuesday, 30 October 2007 and ended on Monday, 17 March 2008.

== Hosts ==
- Adriana Colin (1997–1998)
- Débora Rodrigues (1997–1998)
- Jackeline Petkovic (1997–1998)
- Valéria Balbi (1997–1998)
- Amanda Françozo (1998)
- Tânia Mara (1998)
- Carla Perez (1998–1999)
- Celso Portiolli (2000)
- Márcia Goldschmidt (2000)
- Christina Rocha (2000)
- Otávio Mesquita (2000)
- Lu Barsoti (2000)
- Helen Ganzarolli (2007–2008)
- Caco Rodrigues (2007–2008)
- Luiz Bacci (2007)

== Directors ==
- Paulo Santoro – first, second and third seasons
- Caco Rodrigues – fourth season

== Fantasia girls (1997–2008) ==
- Adriana Henriques Nunes
- Alexssandra Lima
- Aline Franco
- Aline Hauck
- Amanda Françozo
- Ana Lívia Montagna
- Ana Luísa (Luisa)
- Ana Rodrigues
- Ana Santiago
- Andressa Modro
- Angela Sanche Artero
- Angélica Baldini
- Ariana Nasi
- Ariane
- Aretha
- Bel
- Bruna Ganzarolli
- Carina Lima
- Carla Castilho
- Carla
- Carol Porcelli
- Carol Lopes
- Cátia Medeiros
- Cátia Verpa
- Cíntia Assis
- Cláudia Garcia
- Cinthia Lee
- Cristiane Sousa
- Cristiane Diniz
- Cristina
- Daiane
- Daiane Amêndola
- Daiane Carnaes
- Dani Sachetti
- Dani Sobreira
- Daniela de Gea
- Daniela Marcondes
- Daniele Fellit
- Danielle França
- Danielle Santos
- Dayse Conrado
- Deborah Abreu
- Débora Settim (the only girl who participated in the four seasons of the program)
- Denise Catão
- Denise Venturine
- Diana Santana
- Diovana
- Ester
- Elisabete Soares (Bete)
- Ellen Roche
- Érica Vieira
- Eveline Paschoalino
- Fabiana Bueno
- Fabiana Almeida
- Fernanda Boaventura (Nanda)
- Fernanda Did
- Fernanda Garcia
- Fernanda Morais
- Fernanda Vasconcellos
- Flávia Andrade
- Flávia Cristina
- Flávia Vega
- Gabriela Roncatti
- Gláucia Dinis
- Giovana Simioni
- Giovanna
- Hellen Pinheiro
- Izabella Camargo
- Ivy Giorge
- Jade Karen
- Jéssica Moreira
- Joyce Ribeiro
- Joyce Hernandes
- Juliana Domingues
- Juliana Kraieski
- Juliana Lima
- Juliana Scodeler
- Julianinha
- Jussara Binotto
- Karen Ern
- Kate Frazão
- Kátia Volkland
- Larissa Guerrero
- Leslie Balzano
- Lídia Dickel
- Lilian Ramos
- Lívia Andrade
- Lívia Lemos
- Luana
- Luane Pellegrino (Lua)
- Luciana Fontes
- Luma Simões
- Marcela Couto
- Mariana Campos (Mari)
- Maryanne Mayumi
- Michele Lozzo
- Michele Ruiz
- Michelle Nunes
- Milena Fraga
- Milene Uehara
- Mirella Ferraz
- Mônica Nucci
- Monalisa Celeste
- Natália Premici
- Natalie Firmino
- Nathalie Guilmoto (Naty)
- Pâmela Carvalho
- Patty Beijo
- Patrícia Prado
- Patrícia Salvador
- Paula Liebert
- Paula Magalhães
- Poliana
- Pollyana Morbach (Polly)
- Priscila Annunciato
- Queila Arantes
- Rabech Lima
- Rafaella Viscardi
- Rebech Lima
- Renata Dias
- Renata Fukumura
- Renata Nomura
- Renata Ponte
- Renata Paschoal
- Renata Sayuri
- Re Zoéga
- Roberta (Beterraba)
- Roberta Carbone
- Rosane Muniz
- Sabrina Caldana
- Sabrina Rosa
- Sandra Garcia
- Sara Prado
- Selma Roth
- Silvia Burigo
- Simone Bayer
- Simone (Cacau)
- Simone Mattos
- Simone Siqueira
- Solange Cunha
- Sttephannie Morais
- Suelen Gongalves
- Suellen Barreto
- Talita Colucci
- Talita Paganotti (Talitinha)
- Tânia Mara
- Tatiana de Paiva
- Tatiane Cortês
- Tatiane Marques (Tati)
- Tati Hudson
- Thaís
- Thaís (2007 - 2008 version)
- Thais Ortega
- Vanessa Balsamo
- Vanessa Cesnik
- Vanessa Masan
- Vanessa Zotth
- Veronica
- Vick
- Vivian
- Vivi Fernandez
- Viviane Porto
- Wanessa Morgado
- Wanessa Siqueira
