= Marcelo Torres (journalist) =

Brazilian journalist

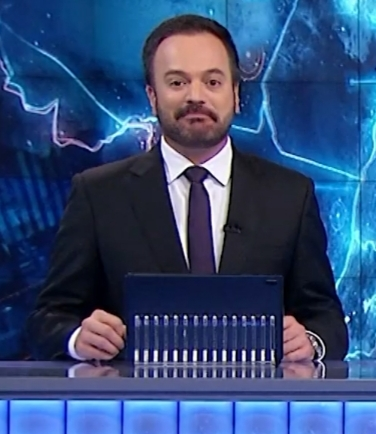
- Born: June 10, 1975 (age 51); Andradas, Minas Gerais, Brazil
- Occupations: Journalist and TV host

Marcelo Torres (born June 10, 1975) is a Brazilian journalist and TV host.

== Biography ==
Torres graduated in journalism from Universidade Estadual Paulista (Unesp) in Bauru, São Paulo in 1996. He holds a master's degree in journalism with a diploma from the University of Westminster in London, England, since 2003.

He started his career while studying at university. In 1997 he started working as a reporter for Jornal da Cidade from Bauru, where he remained until June 1998. But since the beginning of 1998 he was already working as a reporter for TV Globo Oeste Paulista (currently TV TEM Bauru). He was also a reporter for Jornal Nacional in Sorocaba and Belo Horizonte.

In 2003, he traveled to London, where he studied a master's degree in journalism and, later, worked at radio BBC World Service, working in international coverage for a year and a half. international and war events and remained in the role until 2011, when he returned to Brazil.

In 2011 he returned to Brazil as a substitute in several SBT newscasts.

He presented Jornal do SBT alongside Karyn Bravo, between 2013 and 2014, being replaced by Hermano Henning.

On December 14, 2020, SBT announces that Carlos Nascimento's contract would not be renewed, with that Torres, who was already presenting SBT Brasil on an interim basis due to Nascimento's removal due to the COVID-19 pandemic, is effective at the news anchor post, together with Márcia Dantas, staying in this function until March 9, 2024, when he turned back correspondent of the television network, this time, in Argentina.
