= Casos de Familia (American talk show) =

- Genre: Talk show
- Presented by: Judith Grace (2004–2012); Tere Marin (2012-2015)
- Country of origin: United States
- Original language: Spanish

Production
- Running time: 42–45 minutes

Original release
- Network: UniMás
- Release: January 26, 2004 – 2015

Casos de Familia (English: Family Affairs) is a Latin talk show produced by Venevisión International for Univision. Since January 26, 2004, Univision has broadcast Casos de Familia weekday mornings at 10am. Prior to July 30, 2012, Judith Grace was the main presenter of the talk show.

This show has a Brazilian version, showed by SBT, and has the same format, though the channel airs the show on early afternoons.
