= Bruno Bronetta =

Brazilian footballer (born 1984)

Personal information
- Full name: Bruno Rafael Bronetta da Silva
- Date of birth: 19 March 1984 (age 42)
- Place of birth: Mogi das Cruzes, Brazil
- Height: 1.77 m (5 ft 9 1/2 in)
- Position: Midfielder

Youth career
- 2000–2003: Corinthians

Senior career*
Years	Team	Apps	(Gls)
2004–2006	Portuguesa	88	(5)
2006	Rio Branco	13	(1)
2006–2008	Santo André	44	(2)
2008	Dinamo Minsk	17	(2)
2009–2011	Caxias	33	(1)
2010	→ Botafogo SP (loan)	7	(0)
2010	→ Kavala (loan)	8	(0)
2012	Araxá	7	(0)
2013	Flamengo SP	13	(0)
- * Club domestic league appearances and goals

Bruno Rafael Bronetta da Silva (born 19 March 1984) is a former Brazilian footballer.

== Career ==
Bruno Bronetta beginning his career at Portuguesa where he served in all categories to the core team. Also served by Corinthians U-20. He returned to Portugal Sports in July 2004, then went to Santo André for two seasons and the fine 2007 moved to FC Dinamo Minsk from Belarus. After two seasons returned to Brazil for the Caxias, where he remained until 2011.

== Biography ==
Born in Mogi das Cruzes, São Paulo state, Bruno Bronetta started his career at Portuguesa.

=== Santo André ===
After an optimal Paulista championship campaign in 2006 by a team from Rio Branco Esporte Clube, in April 2006, he moved to Santo Andre to compete in the Championship series B, where they finished in sixth position. He renewed his contract with the team until December 2007, playing again in the series B Championship and Paulista Championship.

=== Dinamo Minsk ===
In December 2007, he moved to FC Dinamo Minsk, Belarus, where he signed a contract for three seasons. He played for the club in the 2008 season.

=== Caxias ===
He returned to Brazil to play at this time for SER Caxias do Sul, where he competed in the 2009 Gauchão, reaching the end of the second round against Internacional-RS and losing the title. After a beautiful passage in 2009, he returned to the club in November 2010 to compete in the 2011 Championship Gaucho, Brazil Cup and Championship Brasileiro.

=== Botafogo-SP ===
Signed a contract with Botafogo-SP, had trouble coming to regularise the documentation of the Belarusian Federation and ended up playing only the final seven matches of the championship, but has won the Champion Interior Paulistão 2010.

=== Araxá Esporte Clube ===
He came to Araxá to compete in the State Championship in 2012, became champion with one round in advance and put Araxá again after 22 years in the elite football Miner.
