= Helen Ganzarolli =

Brazilian television presenter and model (born 1979)

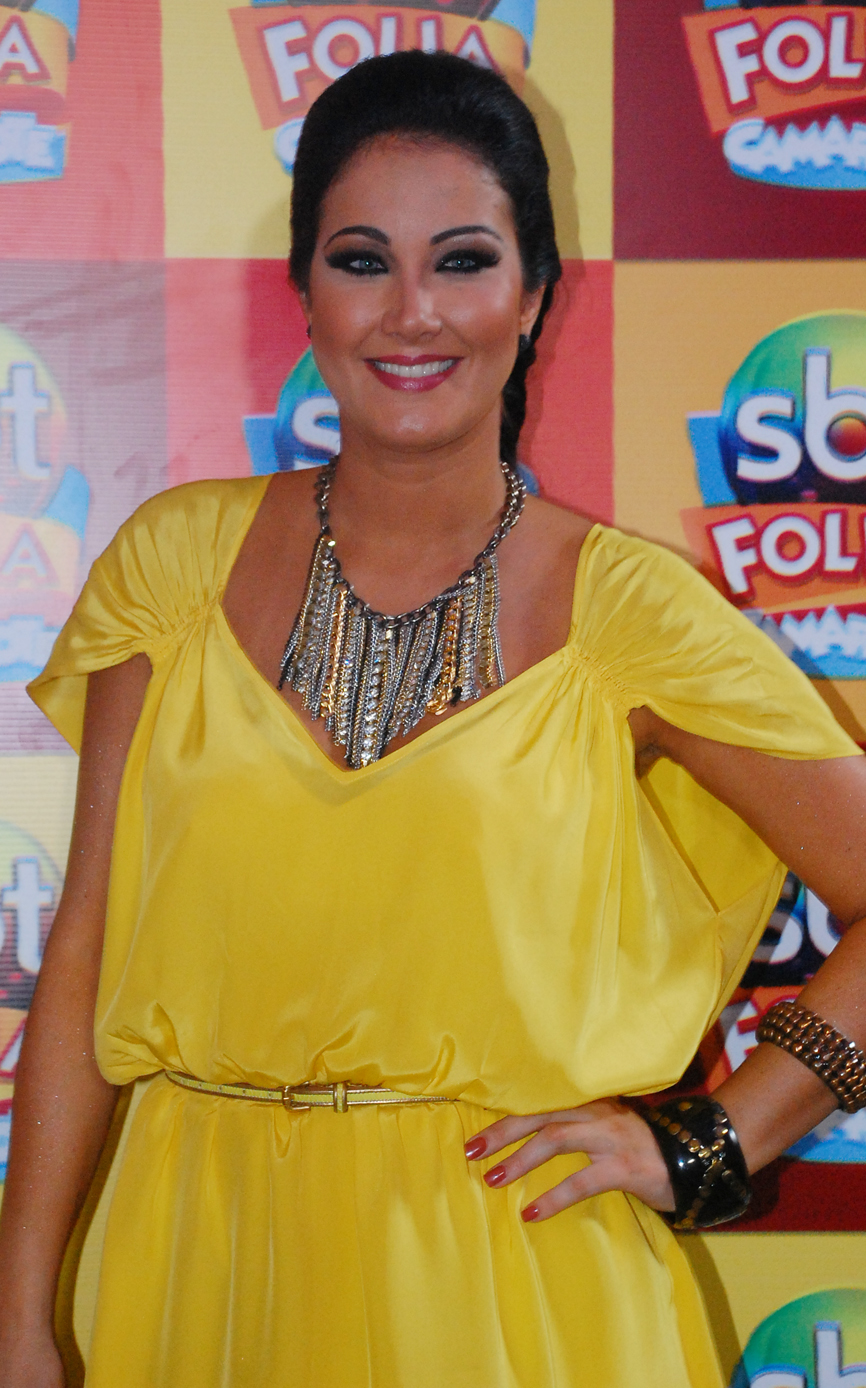
- Ganzarolli in 2012
- Born: 29 September 1979 (age 46); Presidente Venceslau, São Paulo, Brazil
- Occupations: Television presenter; model
- Years active: 2000–present
- Height: 1.76 m (5 ft 9 in)
- Spouse: César Kuratomi (m. 2018)
- Website: www.helenganzarolli.com.br

Helen Ticiane Ganzarolli (born 29 September 1979) is a Brazilian television presenter and model.

== Career ==
She began her career when she moved to the age of twelve to Presidente Venceslau, in the interior of the state of São Paulo, where she participated in several beauty contests and won several titles.

In 1996, when she won a contest called Miss Turismo São Paulo held at the Tourist Resort of Presidente Epitácio, and also participated in the Girl Rodeio Brasil in Barretos, São Paulo, it gained repercussion, which earned her a contract with Ford Models and media exposure, due to fashion shows.

== Filmography ==
=== Television ===
==== As a Stage Assistant ====
Year	Title	TV Channel
2000	Sabadão	SBT
2001-2006	Domingo Legal	SBT

==== As a Presenter ====
Year	Title	TV Channel
2007-2008	Fantasia	SBT
2008	Quem Não Viu, Vai Ver	SBT
2008	Ataque de Risos	SBT
2008-2009	Campeonato de Perguntas	SBT
2009–present	Programa Silvio Santos (Jogo dos Pontinhos)	SBT
2010-2012	Cassetadas Engraçadas e Desastradas	SBT
2010	Telefone e Ganhe	SBT
2011	Eliana (Eliana Maternity Leave)	SBT
2013-2014	Festival Sertanejo	SBT

=== Cinema ===
Year	Film	Role
2003	Didi, O Cupido Trapalhão	Suzy
