= Jackeline Petkovic =

Brazilian model, singer, actress and television host

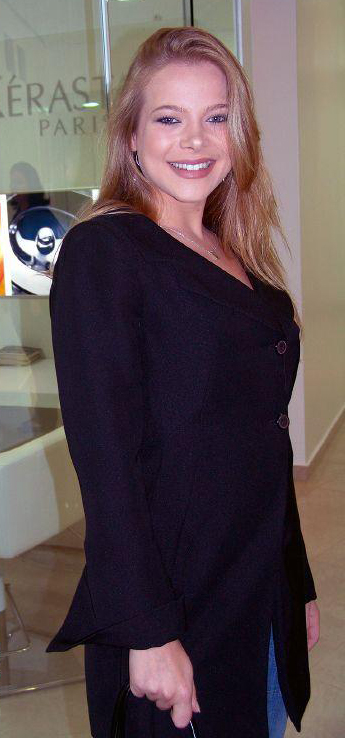
- Born: Jackeline Martins Petkovic; 10 October 1980 (age 45); São Paulo, São Paulo, Brazil
- Occupations: Model, singer, television host, actress
- Spouse: Humberto Visconti (2006–2009)

Jackeline Martins Petkovic (born November 10, 1980) is a Brazilian model, singer, actress and television host.

== Personal life ==
She is of Croatian, Portuguese, Russian and German descent.

== Career ==
=== As television host ===
- Fantasia (1997-1998)
- Bom Dia & Companhia (1998-2003)
- Insomnia (2006-2007)

=== Radio ===
- Boa Tarde, Jacky (2009)
- Papo Sério (2009)

=== Telenovelas ===
- Metamorphoses (2004)

=== Film ===
- Didi, o Cupido Trapalhão (2003)
- Help! I'm a Fish - Brazilian Portuguese version (2003)
- Manuelita - Brazilian Portuguese version (2002)
- Jovens da lei (2010)

=== Discography ===
- Jacky, Yes! A Garota Fantasia (1998, BMG)
- O Circo Encantado da Jacky (1999, Sun Records)
- Amor Virtual (2000, Sun Records)
- Na Onda da Jacky (2002, Sun Records)
