= Primeiro Impacto =

- Genre: Newscast
- Based on: Primer Impacto by Univision
- Directed by: Luiz Antônio Weber
- Presented by: Marcão do Povo; Dani Brandi; Darlisson Dutra; Felipe Malta
- Narrated by: -
- Theme music composer: -
- Opening theme: Instrumental
- Ending theme: Instrumental
- Composer: -
- Country of origin: Brazil
- Original language: Portuguese

Production
- Executive producer: -
- Producer: -
- Production locations: Osasco, São Paulo
- Cinematography: -
- Camera setup: Multicamera
- Running time: 150 minutes
- Budget: -

Original release
- Network: SBT
- Release: March 28, 2016 – present

Related
- Notícias da Manhã

Primeiro Impacto (First Impact) is a Brazilian morning newscast produced and originally broadcast by SBT since March 28, 2016. It is based on U.S. news program Primer Impacto, broadcast by the American Univision network, which broadcasts its programming in Spanish and has its dedicated audience to the Hispanic American public. Initially anchored by journalists Karyn Bravo & Joyce Ribeiro, the television newscast is now presented by Dudu Camargo, the "Bag Man" character performer from the program Fofocando and Marcão do Povo.

== Background and production ==
SBT, since its opening, has always been considered a network that made investments in news programming in the background. That began to change in 1988, when it aired the first edition of the newscast TJ Brasil, anchored by Boris Casoy, which until then the head editor of Folha de S.Paulo. From there, new programs have been popping up in the area, such as Aqui Agora, Jornal do SBT, SBT Repórter, and Documento Especial, a program which originated from Rede Manchete. SBT also just closed a partnership with the newly launched pay channel CBS Telenoticias in 1997 to broadcast their news programs and exchange media materials.

News programming on SBT began to decline after Boris Casoy decided to move to Rede Record, which was why, in late 1997, TJ Brasil was canceled after Hermano Henning took office as an anchor. Aqui Agora was also canceled in the same year due to the success of Fantasia, an entertainment program that replaced the news program in the schedule. In 1999, the partnership with CBS Telenoticias was ended when the channel went on sale and was closed the following year. The end of the partnership with CBS ended up making the program Jornal do SBT the only daily news program and the only newscast in its schedule.

The news programming of SBT was that way for a few years until the network decided to re-invest in news programming in 2005, after contracting Ana Paula Padrão, who was an anchor on Rede Globo. Thus, in August of the same year, Padrão began to anchor a new newscast of the network, SBT Brasil. Besides Ana Paula Padrão's newscast, new news programs joined the SBT schedule in the following years, as Jornal do SBT Manhã, SBT Realidade, Boletim de Ocorrências, and finally Conexão Repórter. The network also had attempts of new, non-durable formats such as SBT Notícias Breves, a new version of Aqui Agora, and more recently, SBT Notícias.

In early 2012, SBT decided to modify Jornal do SBT Manhã, putting the journalist Rodolpho Gamberini, and then César Filho presenter to anchor a live edition of the newscast. With Filho entry in the newscast began to give positive results in audience and the newscast was being modified and became Notícias da Manhã. From the exit of César Filho, who moved to Rede Record in late 2014, Neila Medeiros took over the presentation of the newscast, but with the decline of the ratings, it was canceled in early 2015. SBT initially put a cartoon session in place of the newscast, but it also ended up being replaced by reruns of Jornal do SBT and subsequently were added live inputs of the journalist Patricia Rocha.

In early 2016, during a vacation trip to the United States, Silvio Santos determined that SBT reactivate the time with a new live newscast and that it was based on the Primer Impacto format purchased from Spanish-language American network Univision. Almost immediately, the news department of the network began building its scenery and recording pilots. The premiere was scheduled for March 28, which led to the cancellations of the cartoon session Carrossel Animado and the reruns of Jornal do SBT.

== Format ==
The newscast is based on the American Primer Impacto format, on display for the Univision network, which broadcast its programming in Spanish-language and possess its targeted audience for the Hispanic American public. The original format provides a workbench that makes evident the legs of anchors (which made the press nicknaming the program as the "newscast of the legs"), focused guidelines on police and gossip news. Initially, it was not implemented in the Brazilian version, which was based on what has been presented in the SBT newscast, with variety news, the participation of columnists, traffic information (specifically of the São Paulo) and weather. Subsequently, the weather and the helicopter with traffic information have been removed from newscast. With the loss of contents, the reporter Roger Turchetti was cast in entertainment stories in the newscast.

== Broadcast ==
The newscast debuted at 6am BRT on March 28, 2016, after a replayed edition of Jornal do SBT. It was displayed daily, originally lasting for nearly three hours, and ended after losing more than half their time display, which aired between 6 am and 8.30 am airing until September with only one hour. The newscast was being broadcast in high definition on May 9, 2016, on the same day as the other SBT newscasts.

In September 12, the newscast had an increase in broadcast time, passing that way to have the whole two hours. With this change, the rerun of Fofocando was canceled on September 9.

After a brief break caused by a December 2016 cancellation, it returned on February 1, 2017 with Dudu Camargo announced as the permanent presenter, joined by Marcão do Povo. However, SBT management reformatted the program as an afternoon newscast in mid-March, but the decision was reversed.

In 2018, the program expanded to 5 and a half hours of live news, and in 2018 moved its start to 4am, competing with TV Globo's Hora Um da Noticia. To mark SBT's 30th anniversary and the program's 5th year in 2021, Darlisson Dutra joined the program.

In 2022, the program returned to a 6am start, but split into 3 editions all ending at 12nn BRT. When Bom Dia e Companhia ended its 28 year run on SBT that year, the newscast was the big winner, finally competing head on with the competition when the network gave the vacant slots left to it. By October, it became a seven-hour long newcast with a midday local news segment - no other Brazilian TV news program had ever done that before since Jornal da Record did that move in 1984 as a two hour primetime newscast, and it was the first time that a morning news program had ever done the impossible.

In 2024, the program had its broadcast time cut to give way to the brand new program Chega Mais.
