= Casos de Família (Brazilian talk show) =

Brazilian TV talk show

- Genre: Interviews; Debates
- Based on: Casos de familia by Venevisión
- Directed by: Galvão França (2004–2009); Rafael Bello; Melissa Ribeiro; Raul Garin
- Presented by: Regina Volpato (2004–2009); Christina Rocha (2009–2023; 2025–present)
- Country of origin: Brazil
- Original language: Portuguese

Production
- Producers: View more: Fabiano Pescarelli; Priscila Dempsey; André Caldana; Paloma Sales; Marcio Emendabili; Ariane Machado; David Alves; Larissa Kawabata; Leonardo Soncin; Renato Tres
- Production locations: CDT da Anhanguera, Osasco
- Camera setup: Multiple-camera
- Running time: 60 minutes

Original release
- Network: SBT
- Release: May 18, 2004 – March 17, 2023
- Release: July 28, 2025 – present

Casos de Família is a Brazilian television talk show produced and broadcast by SBT May 18, 2004, to March 17, 2023. After a 2-year hiatus, the program returned to SBT's schedule and has been airing since July 28, 2025. It was hosted by Christina Rocha, who had replaced Regina Volpato in 2009, when the show's format has been reformulated.

== Format ==
Casos de Família presents daily themes that will highlight the emotions of the participants on the stage, the invited audience and the viewers who are at home. In addition to the guests, the audience also actively participates in the show with opinions and questions about the stories told. The intention is to guide and even solve the cases presented with the participation of a psychologist.

After 4 years in charge of Casos de Família, Regina Volpato stated that she would not renew the contract for personal reasons, and would take over the program until the end of her contract with the station, which won on February 28, 2009. It was speculated that the reason for the departure of Regina Volpato would be the implantation of the Venezuelan "¿Quién tiene la razón?" format in the show, where people literally discuss the topics that have to be addressed, and in this one would have the famous "heated debate", besides "intense verbal conflicts" and dealing with embarrassing situations

== History ==
In 2004, SBT acquired the format from Venevisión, and hired journalist Regina Volpato (formerly Fundação Roberto Marinho and BandNews) to lead it. She hosted Casos de Família between May 18, 2004 and February 27, 2009. On February 15, 2023, almost five months after its first cancellation was announced, SBT chose to close the attraction for good due to the drop in audience ratings in its last years and commercial losses, justifying its departure as a format's rest period, with the last episode airing on March 17. The space would be occupied by Fofocalizando, which would gain more time on the air from the 20th. Even though it was extinct, SBT reported that the program could return in the future, but it didn't happen. After some speculation, SBT finally confirmed Christina Rocha's return to the project, as well as her return date for August 2025, initially occupying the 2:15 PM time slot to replace the rerun of the Mexican soap opera La Usurpadora. However, the premiere was moved up to July 28, now in the 2:45 PM time slot.
