= Luiz Bacci =

Brazilian journalist

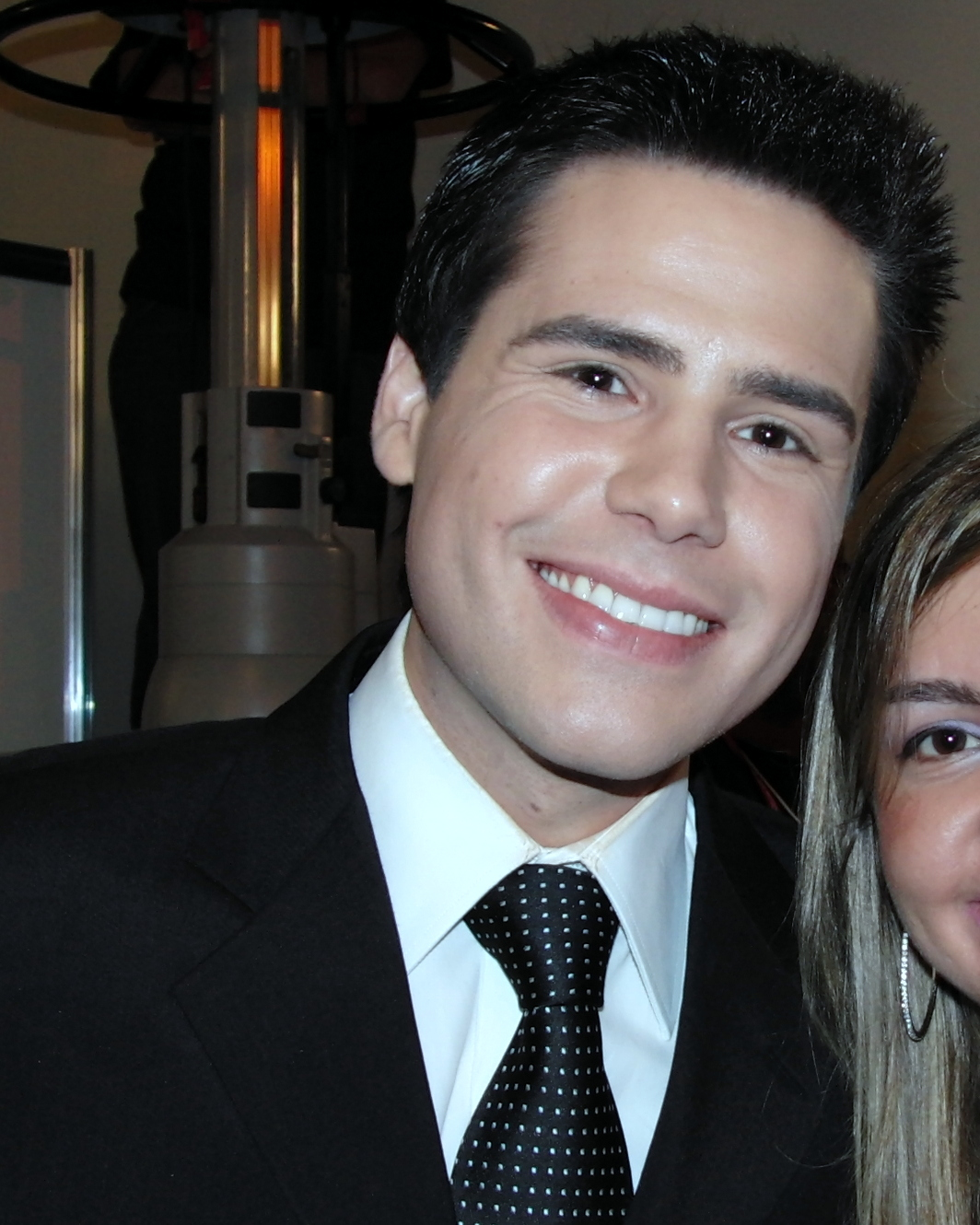
- Bacci in 2010
- Born: March 12, 1984 (age 42); Mogi das Cruzes, São Paulo, Brazil
- Other names: Bacci; Menino de Ouro (The Golden Boy)
- Occupations: Journalist and TV host

Luiz Fernando Elui Bacci, best known as Luiz Bacci (born March 12, 1984), is a Brazilian journalist and TV host.

== Career ==
Bacci debuted in 1995 as presenter of Show das Crianças on Rádio Diário from Mogi das Cruzes, his birthplace, doing interviews with local personalities. In 1998, aged thirteen, he presented the children's program Domingo no Palco on Rede Manchete. Back in his birthplace, he presented the auditorium program Estação Mix, on TV Diário, an affiliate of TV Globo, between 2001 and 2005. In 2006, with the end of the program and already graduated in journalism, he became a reporter for Bom Dia Diário, on the same station. In 2007, he was hired by SBT as a reporter for SBT Brasil and made numerous reports, including coverage of the disaster with the TAM plane in Congonhas, the collapse of the subway station in São Paulo, the visit of Pope Benedict XVI to Brazil, the death of Michael Jackson, among others.

In October he presented the program for the re-release of Fantasia, which ended up not being effective, and in 2008 he was one of the presenters of Aqui Agora.

In 2009 and 2010 he was transferred to Rio de Janeiro, where he presented the newscast SBT Rio on SBT Rio de Janeiro.

On November 24, 2010, he was hired by RecordTV and became a reporter for Balanço Geral RJ and RJ no Ar. Due to his good performance, he was promoted to presenter Cidade Alerta Rio, remaining from July to December 2012. in the mornings of Balanço Geral RJ and became a correspondent for Cidade Alerta in São Paulo with a news block in Rio de Janeiro. In 2014 he was transferred to São Paulo to present the Balanço Geral SP at lunchtime. Aiming to focus on entertainment, he signed with Band on May 22, 2014, where he debuted the afternoon program Tá na Tela on August 4. The attraction, however, was canceled in December of that year with only four months on the air due to low ratings. With that, Bacci was transferred to present Café com Jornal.

Dissatisfied with the little space on the station, he announced on March 31, 2015, his return to RecordTV, where he took over the presentation of the morning edition of Balanço Geral SP and SP no Ar, in addition to the Saturday editions of Cidade Alerta. On May 5, 2017, he temporarily took over the presentation of Cidade Alerta after Marcelo Rezende left for cancer treatment. After Marcelo's death, on September 18 of the same year, he became effective in the presentation.

Bacci would stay in the presentation of Cidade Alerta until January 17, 2025, when he announced his exit of Record after almost ten consecutive years in the station to dedicate at projects via internet. On May 2, 2025, he agreed his return to SBT after 15 years to take over a newscast in the lunchtime.

== Personal life ==
In 2006, he graduated in journalism from the University of Mogi das Cruzes. He has a Maltese dog named Toy.
