= Amanda Françozo =

Brazilian television presenter and model

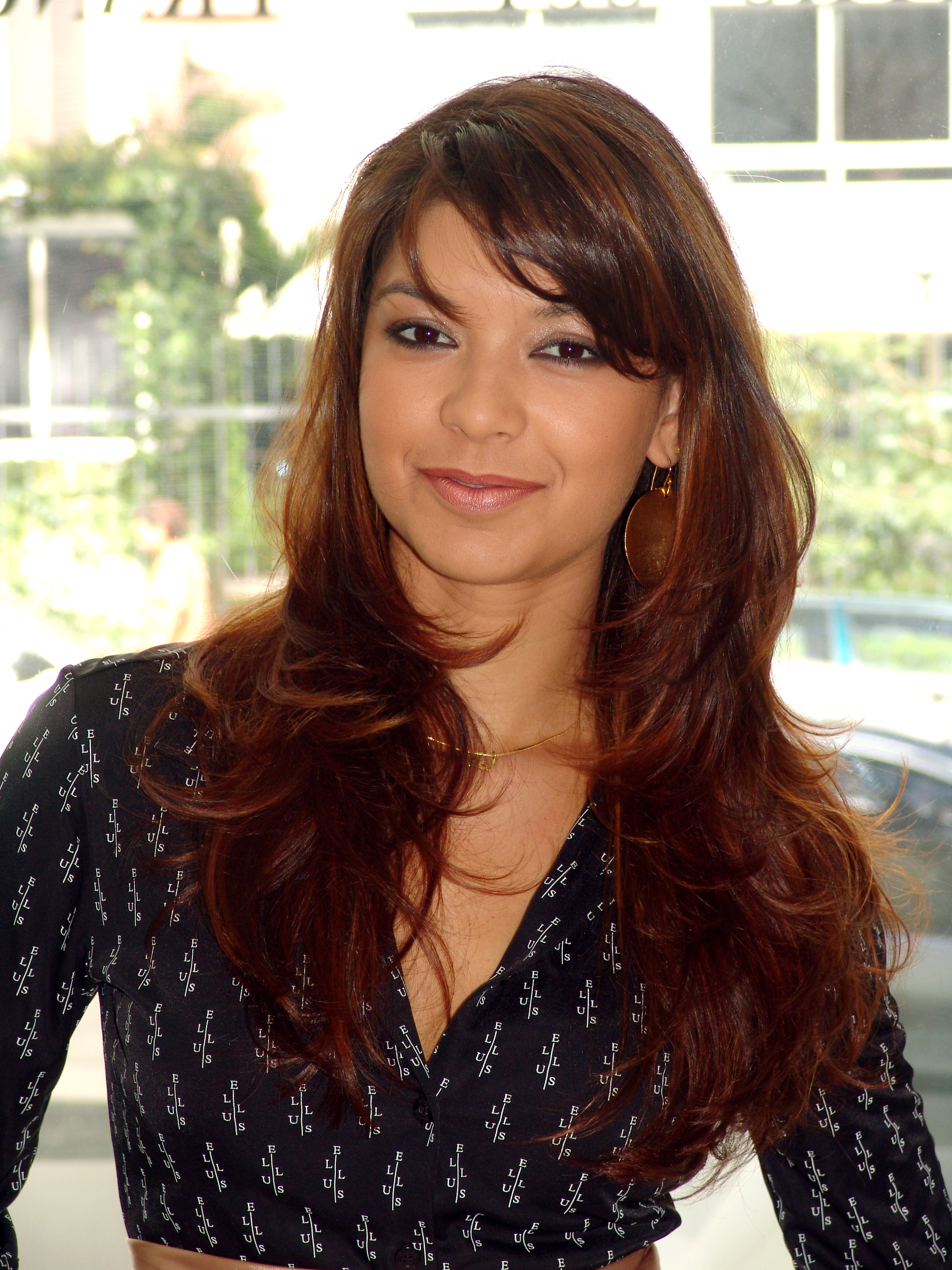
- Born: Amanda Françozo; July 7, 1979 (age 45); Ibaté, São Paulo state, Brazil
- Occupation(s): television presenter, model
- Years active: 2000 - present
- Website: Amanda Françozo

Amanda Françozo (born July 7, 1979) is a Brazilian television presenter and model. Since 2007, she has presented the chat show Papo De Amigos on the TV Gazeta television network based in São Paulo. She is also an exponent of Carnaval Samba dancing, and in 2008 and 2009 was appointed Madrinha da Bateria (Godmother of the Percussion) for the Vai-Vai samba school.
