= Daniela Albuquerque =

Brazilian television presenter and journalist (born 1982)

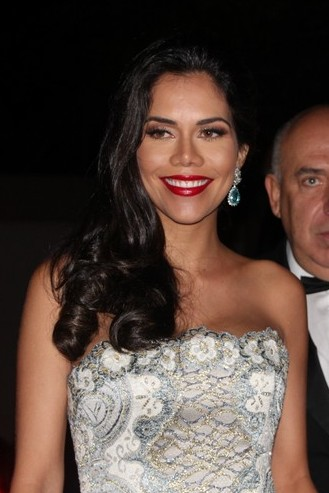
- Albuquerque in 2015.
- Born: July 22, 1982 (age 44); Dourados, Mato Grosso do Sul, Brazil
- Occupations: Television presenter and journalist
- Spouse: Amílcare Dallevo Júnior (m. 2006)
- Children: 2

Daniela Albuquerque Dallevo, better known as Daniela Albuquerque (born July 22, 1982), is a Brazilian television presenter and journalist. Albuquerque currently presents the TV show Sensacional (Sensational), on RedeTV!. Her husband is Amílcare Dallevo, owner of the network.

== Biography ==
Born in Dourados, Mato Grosso do Sul, Daniela Albuquerque grew in a humble family, and to help in the family's livelihood, she started working at the age of 13 as a nanny and street vendor of clothes. In interviews, Albuquerque shared a bit about her early life, when she worked as a street vendor: "When I was 14 years old, my mother and I set up a sales stall and I was going to Paraguay by bus to buy several items at a lower price, like diapers, clothes, cigarettes, drinks, sweets and food to resale in Brazil". During her adolescence, Albuquerque worked as a nanny and later in insurance companies and law firms.

Albuquerque moved alone to Presidente Prudente at the age of 18, where she got a job as a shoe store manager, and she passed the university entrance exam, joining in the journalism course, graduating four years later. In this time, Albuquerque graduated in theatre by the Célia Helena School. She presented six theatrical plays, among them: Nossa Vida em Família (Our Life in Family), A Corista (The Chorus Girl), Um Bonde Chamado Desejo (A Tram Called Desire), Vulgar, E Se... Os Saltimbancos in Concert (And If... The Saltimbancos in Concert) and Cantando Tchecov (Singing Tchecov).

Albuquerque participated in the special program of 20 years of RedeTV! in 2013 with the sitcom Cortiço Treme Treme, playing the character of the scammer Marlete Jet Set.

== Career ==
Albuquerque started her artistic career as a journalism intern, in the production of the defunct program Bom Dia Mulher (Good Morning Woman), from RedeTV!. In 2007, the artistical director of the network, Mônica Pimentel, invited her to present the program Dr. Hollywood (Dr. 90210). With the success of the reality show, she passed to present the program Manhã Maior (Largest Morning). In 2013, Albuquerque started presenting the program Sob Medida (Custom-Made), that was on air until August 2015. Currently, Albuquerque presents the program Sensacional (Sensational).

In 2009, Albuquerque launched the Dr. Hollywood by Daniela Albuquerque product line, that is constituted by corporal and facial creams. In the same year, she won the Prêmio Jovem Brasileiro. In 2011, Albuquerque launched her bath line by Ares Perfumes e Cosméticos. She still acted in videoclips of the singer Claudio Zoli and the band Cristelo. Albuquerque studied drama and pretends to act in more movies, but she made clear that her greater focus is presenting TV shows.

== Philanthropy ==
Albuquerque has been the godmother of the children of the Cristóvão Colombo Institute since 2006. In 2015, she participated in Teleton as a presenter, and again in 2016.

== Personal life ==
Albuquerque started dating the president of RedeTV!, Amílcare Dallevo Júnior, in 2004, and married him in 2006.

In November 2011, Albuquerque announced that she was expecting her first daughter. Her firstborn daughter, Alice Albuquerque Dallevo, was born on April 22, 2012, in São Paulo. On March 3, 2015, her second daughter, Antonella Albuquerque Dallevo was born, also in São Paulo.
