= SBT Brasil =

- Genre: Newscast
- Presented by: César Filho; Amanda Klein (Saturday); Simone Queiroz (Saturday); Mauro Beting (sports news segment anchor); Galvão Bueno (sports news segment anchor); Nadine Bastos (sports news segment anchor); Luara Castilho (weather segment anchor)
- Narrated by: -
- Theme music composer: -
- Composer: -
- Country of origin: Brazil
- Original language: Portuguese

Production
- Executive producer: -
- Producer: -
- Production locations: Osasco, São Paulo
- Cinematography: -
- Camera setup: Multicamera
- Running time: 75 minutes
- Budget: -

Original release
- Network: SBT
- Release: 15 August 2005 – present

Related
- Primeiro Impacto; Jornal da SBT; TJ Brasil

SBT Brasil is the newscast of Sistema Brasileiro de Televisão, created on August 15, 2005, to fill a gap in its news operation. It is its main news bulletin.

== History ==
SBT lacked a prime time news bulletin since the cancellation of TJ Brasil, when Boris Casoy left the network and joined Record. This debilitated its news operation, with Jornal do SBT shown in the morning and late at night. In 2005, to counter the lack of a primetime bulletin, SBT hired Ana Paula Padrão, formerly of Jornal da Globo, to host the new bulletin, which was set to air at 10pm in an initial plan. The network released campaigns poking at Globo and creating puns with her surname saying "Globo no longer has standard" (Padrão, her surname, is "standard" in Portuguese, with the joke being a reference to Globo's quality standards). The program aired for the first time on August 15, 2005, in the wake of a trend where there was an increased number of non-Globo newscasts presented by "Globo school" presenters (who formerly worked at the network). Jornal da Band reacted by moving to the same timeslot as SBT Brasil (7:15pm).

In its early years, SBT Brasil had constant airtime fluctuations (from the initial 7:15pm slot; in 2007 it aired at 9:30pm), which would cause a decline in ratings. Dissatisfied with the results, facing an IBOPE average of only five points, she planned a series of changes, including in its reporting style, as well as a "golden dream" of her, moving to 9pm.

On October 5, 2018, its format changed, ending the functions of its commentators, with the presenters in charge of the entire bulletin. This led to the firing of Kennedy Alencar, who was its political analyst.

On March 11, 2024, it was reformulated, taking a more informal structure, compared to its competitors, abandoning the table standard, which was in use since the beginning. César Filho became its new presenter, replacing Marcelo Torres, who became the network's international correspondent in Argentina, and Márcia Dantas, who became the weather presenter and editor-in-chief.
