= Márcia Dantas =

Brazilian journalist

- Born: August 1, 1987 (age 39); Belém, Pará, Brazil
- Occupations: Journalist and TV host
- Children: 1

Márcia Dantas (born August 1, 1987) is a Brazilian journalist and TV host.

== Career ==
Márcia began her journalistic career at the age of 19 as an intern at Record Belém.

In 2008, she debuted at RBA TV (affiliated with Band in Pará), where she worked as a reporter and stayed until 2011.

She had her second stint at Record Belém between 2011 and 2015, where she presented Fala Pará and Pará Record, until being transferred to the network's headquarters, in São Paulo.

In 2016, she started working at SBT, initially joining the team of reporters. Later, she began presenting journalistic programs, such as SBT Notícias, Primeiro Impacto and SBT Brasil, and in the latter, she was a presenter until March 9, 2024, together with Marcelo Torres. Dantas continues in the newscast, but as a weather girl and also as an occasional host at Saturdays.

In addition to television, she also organizes online classes in television journalism and techniques for working on TV.
