= Karyn Bravo =

Brazilian journalist

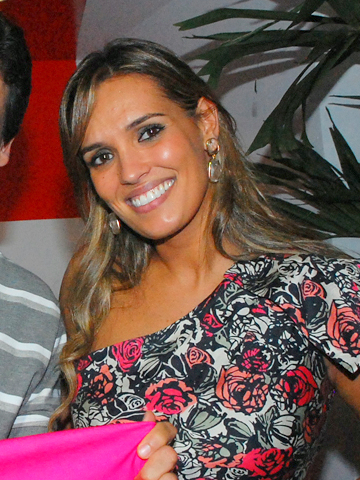
- Bravo in 2012
- Born: October 9, 1981 (age 44); São Paulo, Brazil
- Occupations: Journalist and TV host
- Children: 2

Karyn Christina Losada Bravo, best known as Karyn Bravo (born October 9, 1981), is a Brazilian journalist and TV host.

== Career ==
She graduated in Pedagogy and Journalism, with a postgraduate degree. She began her career in 2003 on Rede Bandeirantes as the editor of international news for Jornal da Band. Then, she took over the editing and presentation of Weather Forecast on the newscasts and Notícias da Redação; she also presented the Primeiro Jornal. She was a reporter and, eventually, presenter of Jornal da Band, alongside journalist Ricardo Boechat.

In November 2008, Karyn was hired by SBT. She made special reports, interviews with presidential candidates, participated in the electoral calculations, political sabbaths, in the main journalism coverage and anchored the news programs SBT São Paulo (2012), SBT Brasil (2009-2011), Jornal do SBT (2012-2016) and Primeiro Impacto (2016). She edited and presented SBT Notícias, until 2019, when she was released from the station.

In July 2019, she was hired by TV Cultura, where currently she is the presenter of Jornal da Cultura.

Since March 2020, she has presented the podcast Melhor da Vida (Best of the Life), which addresses health and well-being, featuring interviews with experts and mixing information and quality music (classical, jazz and Brazilian instrumental).

== Personal life ==
Since 2012, Karyn is married to the dental surgeon André Loureiro, with whom she has two children: Eduardo and Rafaela, born in 2014 and 2018, respectively.
