= Mogi das Cruzes =

- Municipality
- Municipality of Mogi das Cruzes
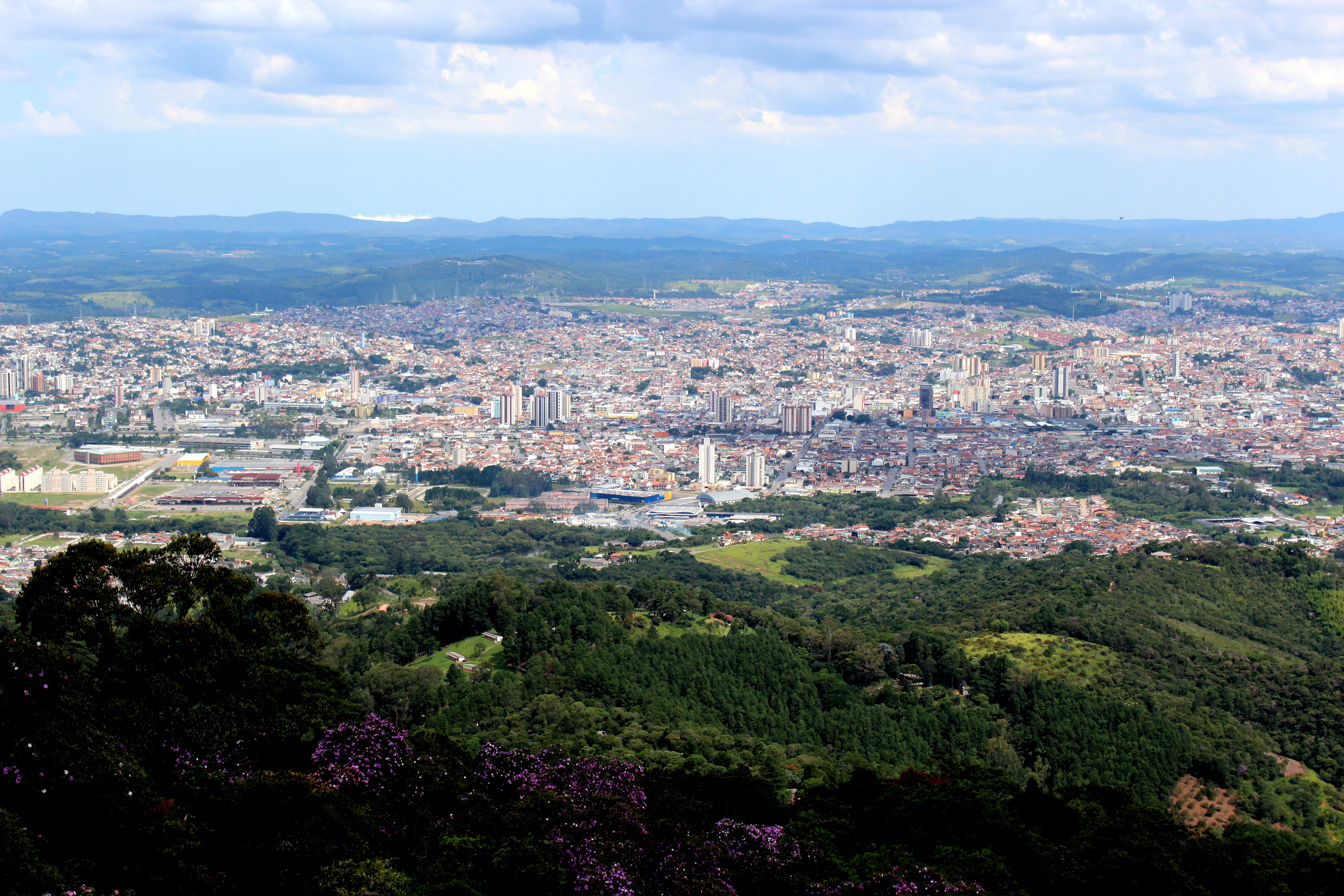
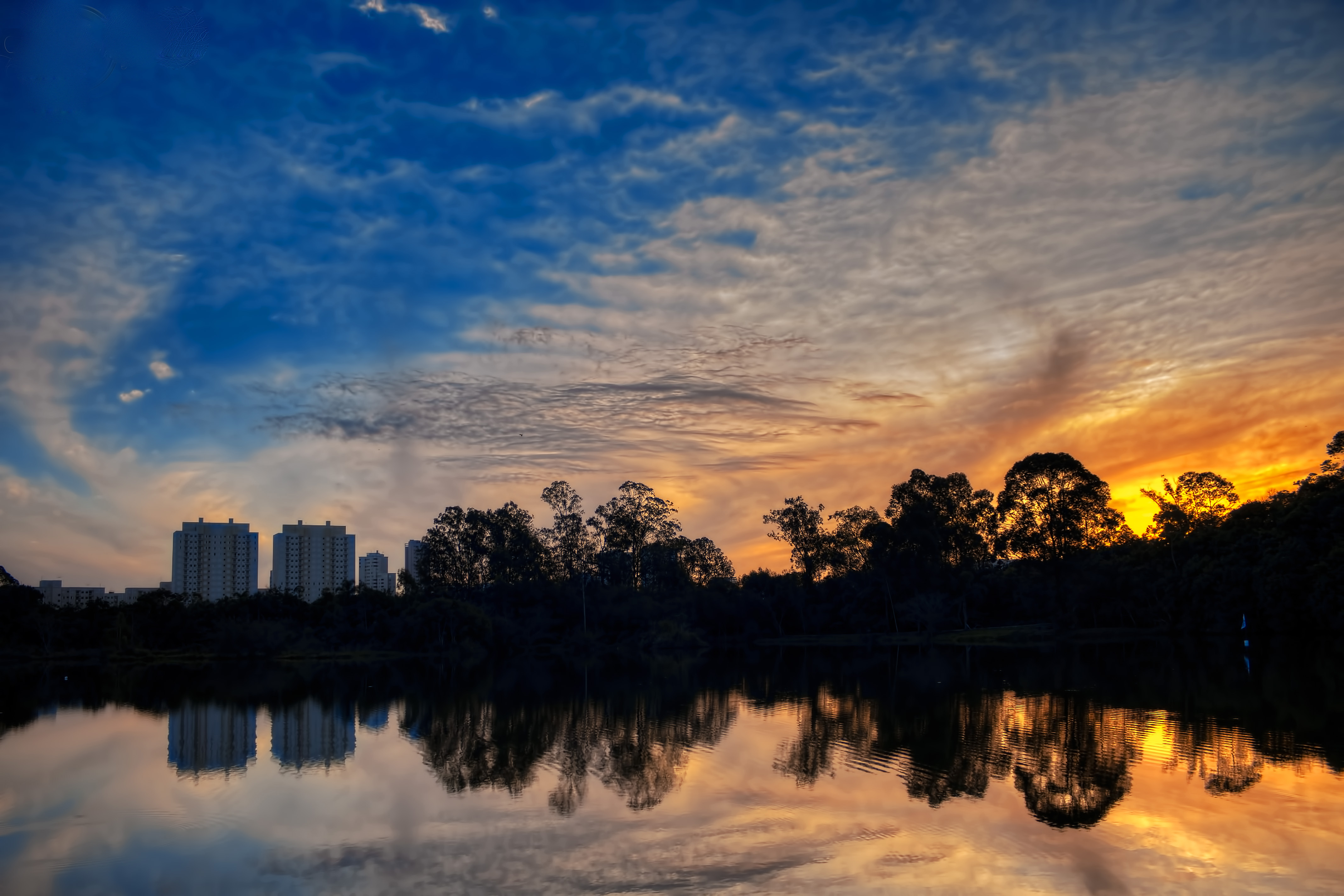
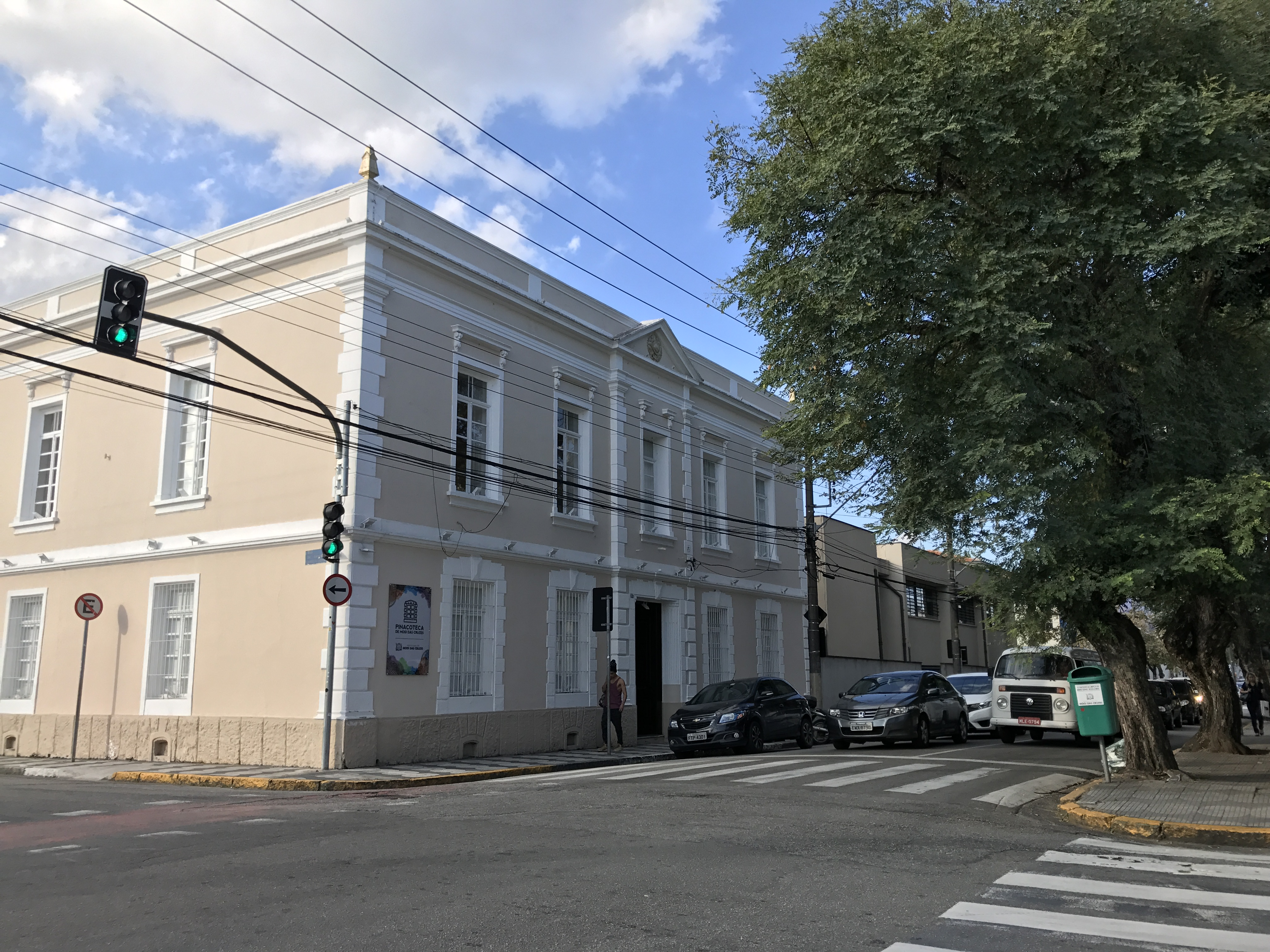
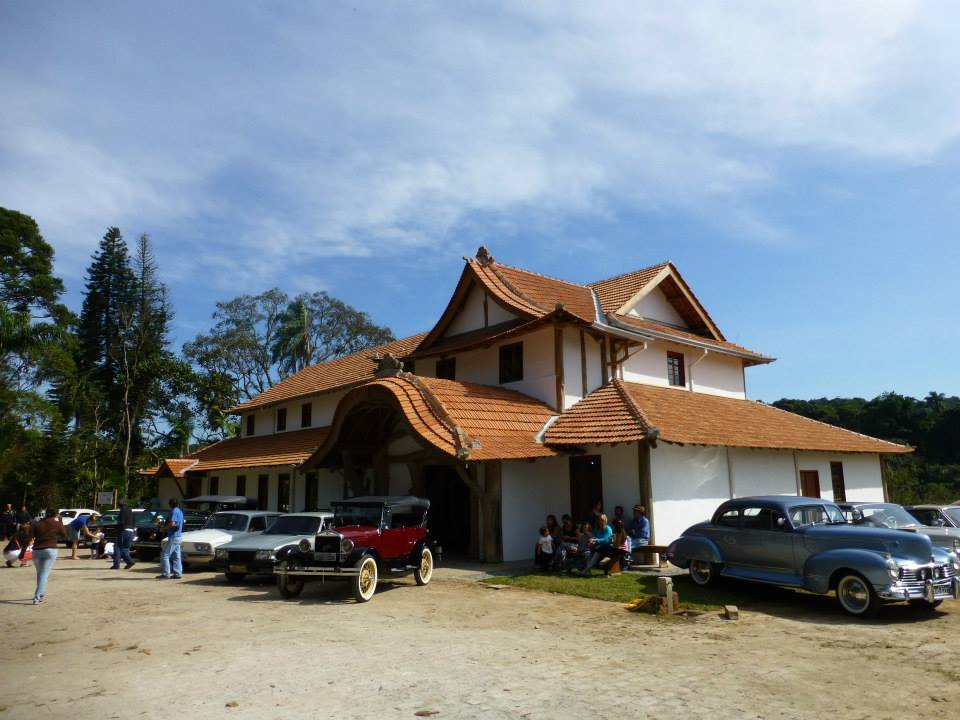
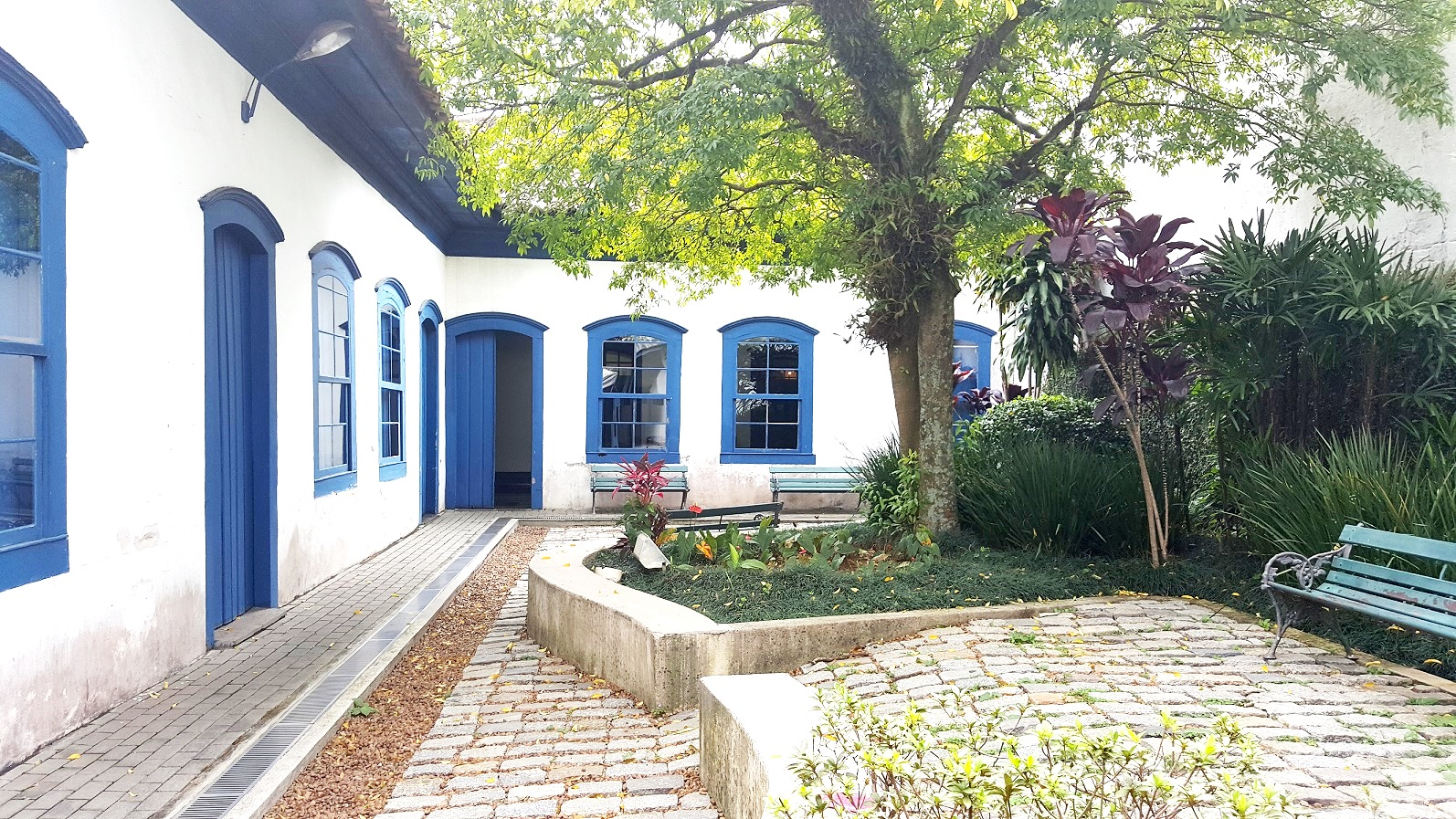
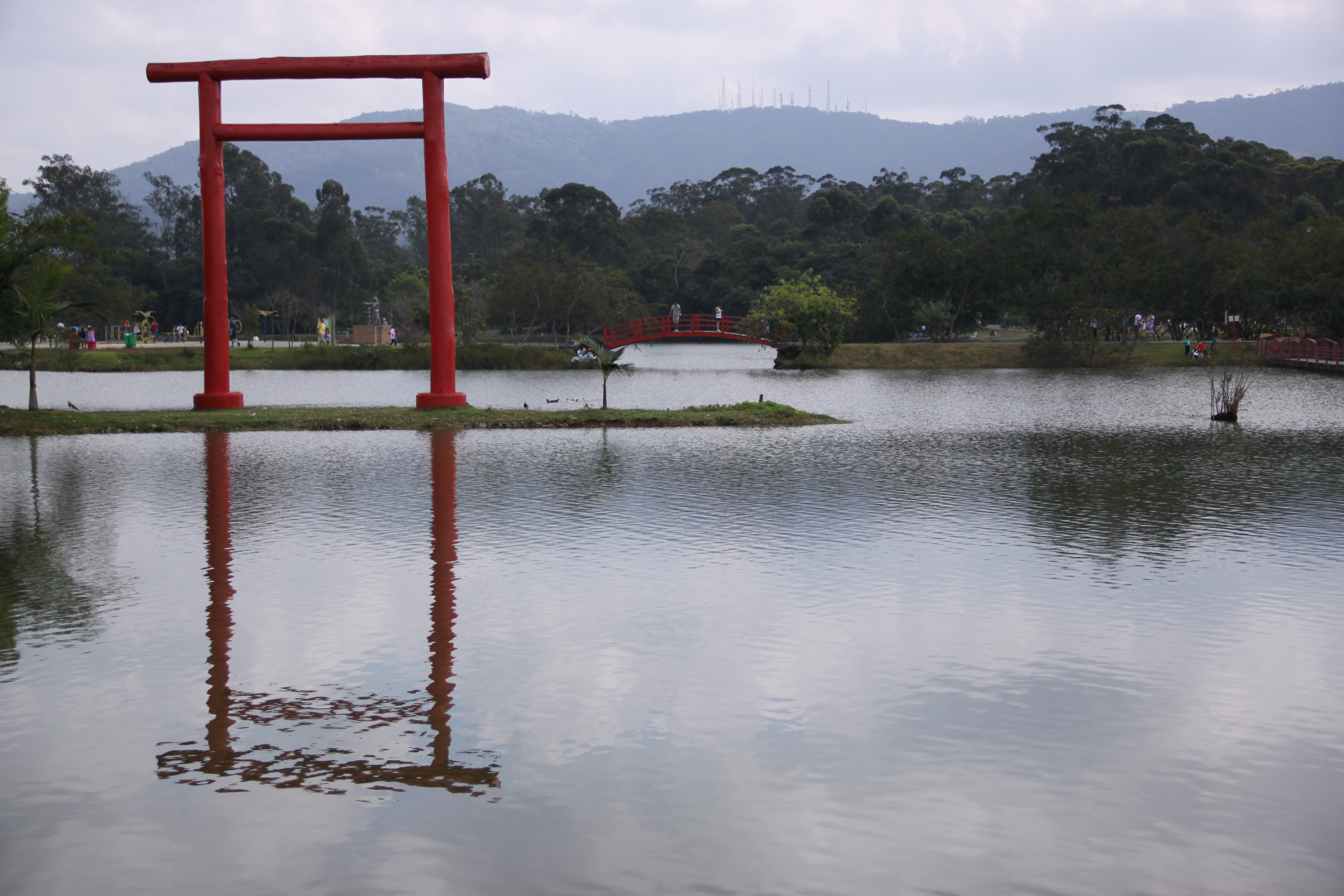
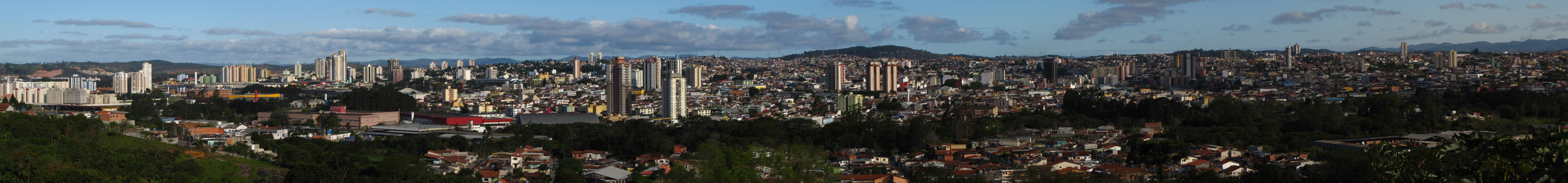

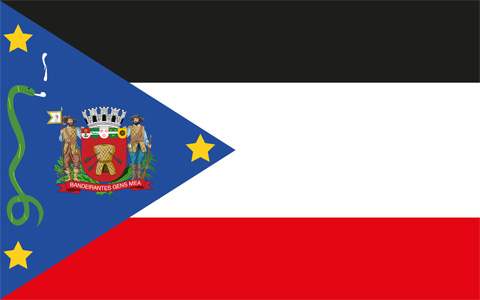
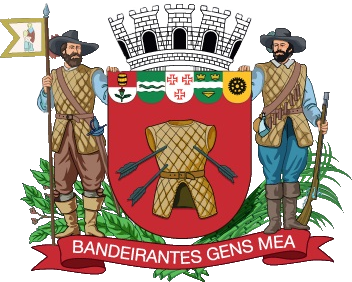
- Flag Coat of arms
- Motto: Bandeirantes Gens Mea (Latin)
- Location in São Paulo state

- Location in Brazil
- Coordinates: 23°31′22″S 46°11′16″W
- Country: Brazil
- Region: Southeast
- State: São Paulo

Government
  - Mayor: Maria Luisa Piccolomini Bertaiolli (PL)

Area
  - Total: 713 km^{2} (275 sq mi)
- Elevation: 780 m (2,560 ft)

Population (2022)
  - Total: 451,505
  - Estimate (2025): 470,302
  - Density: 633/km^{2} (1,640/sq mi)
- Time zone: UTC-03:00 (BRT)
  - Summer (DST): UTC-02:00 (BRST)
- HDI (2010): 0.783 – high
- Website: www.mogidascruzes.sp.gov.br

Mogi das Cruzes (Portuguese pronunciation: [moˈʒi] or [muˈʒi das ˈkɾuzis]) is a municipality in the state of São Paulo, Brazil, located within the metropolitan region of the state capital of the city of São Paulo. The population is 451,505 (2022 census) in an area of 713 km^{2}. It is located 40 km to the east of the city of São Paulo. It was founded in 1560 by the bandeirantes. The sprawling municipality, which includes many rural areas, is the easternmost arm of São Paulo conburbation (built up area) seen on satellite images. César de Souza and Brás Cubas districts are considered the suburban core, center of town and a city within the municipality in a horizontal line east of the built-up area of Suzano.

== History ==
Mogi das Cruzes began as a village around 1560, serving as a resting place for the bandeirantes and explorers coming and going from São Paulo, including Brás Cubas. In September 1608, the Captain-Major of the Captaincy of São Vicente, Gaspar Conqueiro, granted Gaspar Vaz Guedes a Sesmaria in that location. Gaspar Vaz Guedes was responsible for opening the first road between the capital and Mogi, starting the village, later elevated to a "town", with the name "Vila de Sant'Ana de Mogi Mirim". The fact was made official on September 1, 1611. On March 13, 1865, it was elevated to the status of city, and on April 14, 1874, it was elevated to the status of county.

According to historian Isaac Grinberg, the bandeirante Gaspar Vaz, in addition to being responsible for opening and exploring these lands, after acquiring a land grant in the region, was also responsible for the request to elevate the settlement to a town. This occurred in 1611, on the first of September.

Mogi das Cruzes welcomes colonies from all corners of the world, with a special emphasis on Japanese colonization, with a large number of Japanese and their descendants (approximately 20% according to the city hall), who are already in their third generation in the municipality. In addition, the municipality has a considerable population from the northeast, with the majority of whom came to the state capital and later moved to Mogi das Cruzes in search of a better quality of life.

== Districts ==
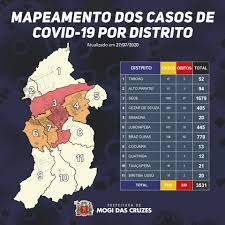
Map showing districts of Mogi, as of year 2020, which covers a vast area, half as large territorially as the capital Paulista itself. The once huge district of Sede was split into its current size and shape. Note how districts 3,4,6, and 7 are the main settlement and built-up area. The rest of the municipality is largely rural.

The municipality is subdivided into the following districts:

- Brás Cubas (named after Brás Cubas)
- Biritiba-Ussu
- César de Sousa
- Jundiapeba
- Quatinga
- Sabaúna
- Taiaçupeba

== Media ==
In telecommunications, the city was served by Companhia Telefônica da Borda do Campo. In July 1998, this company was acquired by Telefónica, which adopted the Vivo brand in 2012. The company is currently an operator of cell phones, fixed lines, internet (fiber optics/4G) and television (satellite and cable).

== Notable people ==
- Bruno Bronetta - retired footballer
- Bruno Cazarine - retired professional footballer, played at top levels in Brazil, Europe, Middle East, Asia. Last played for Sydney FC
- Edmar Halovskyi - retired professional footballer, who lasted played for Ukraine national team and Metalist 1925 Kharkiv
- Maikon Leite - professional footballer, plays for Juara.
- Neymar (born 1992), footballer who plays for Santos FC and the top goalscorer of the Brazil national football team
- Felipe Augusto de Almeida Monteiro - professional footballer
- Yan Gomes - (born 1987) Chicago Cubs baseball player
- Guilherme Taucci Monteiro - one of two perpetrators of the Suzano massacre

== See also ==
- List of municipalities in São Paulo
