= Clodovil Hernandes =

Brazilian politician

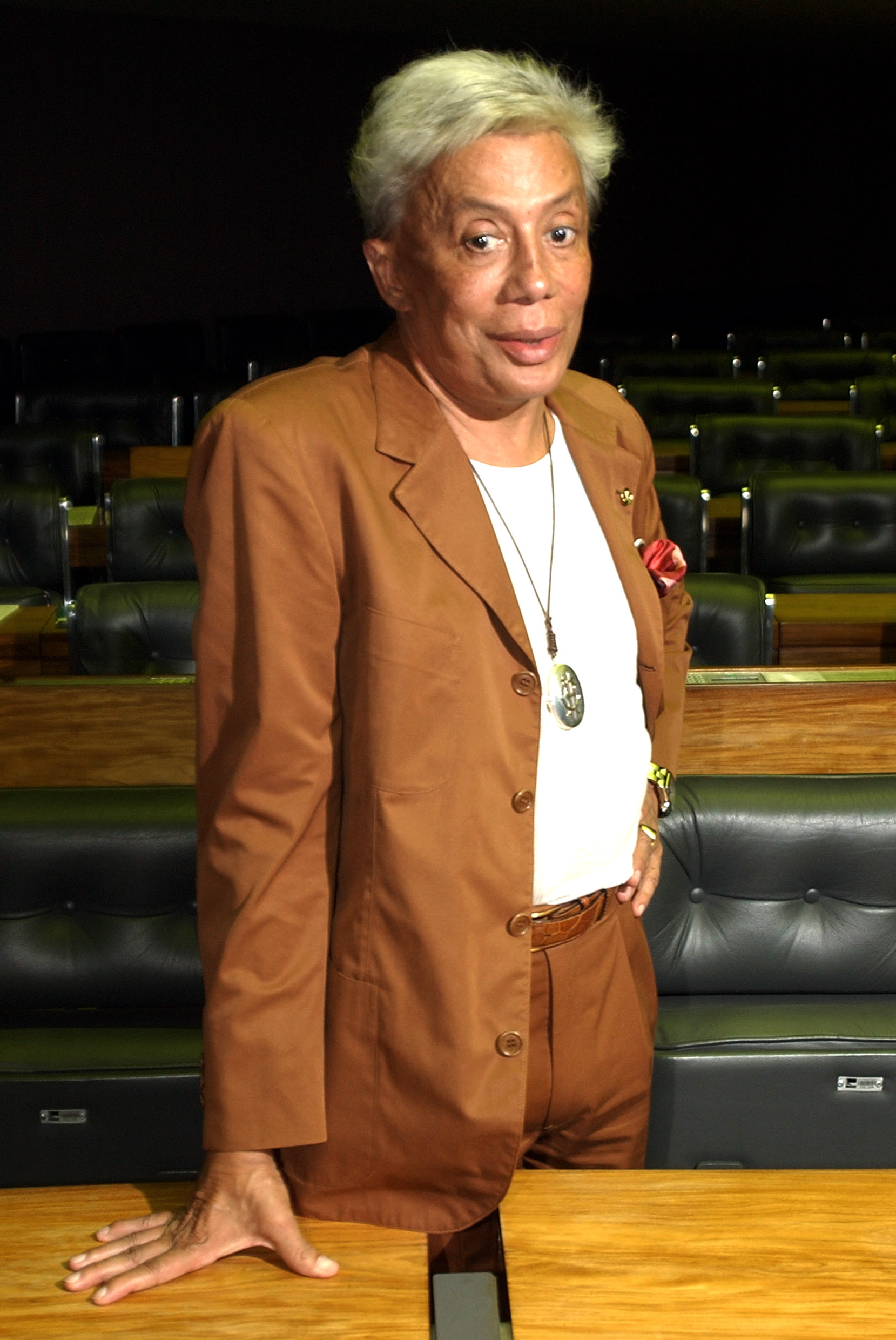
- Hernandes in 2007

Federal Deputy for São Paulo
- In office 1 February 2007 – 17 March 2009
- Constituency: At-large

Personal details
- Born: Clodovil Hernandes; 17 June 1937 Catanduva, (Note: The location where Hernandes was born is now the city of Elisiário, in the countryside of the state of São Paulo. In 1937, it was a district of Catanduva. Elisiário became a municipality on 30 December 1991.) São Paulo, Brazil
- Died: 17 March 2009 (aged 71) Brasília, Federal District, Brazil
- Resting place: Morumbi Cemetery, São Paulo, Brazil
- Party: PTC (2005–07); PR (2007–09)
- Occupation: Fashion designer; Television presenter; Politician; Philanthropist
- Nickname: Clô

Clodovil Hernandes (Brazilian Portuguese pronunciation: [klodoˈviw eʁˈnɐ̃dʒis]; 17 June 1937 – 17 March 2009) was a Brazilian fashion designer, television presenter, and politician.

Hernandes gained fame as a fashion stylist during the 1960s and 1970s, after which he was invited to work in television. His career on television spanned more than 40 years across various stations. In politics, Hernandes was known for making statements that were often considered inappropriate, sometimes directed at other public figures. Among other controversies, he was accused of racism and antisemitism. Hernandes was also the first openly gay congressman in Brazil.

== Biography ==
Hernandes was born on 17 June 1937 in Elisiário, Brazil, and was raised by a Spanish immigrant couple, Diego Hernández and Isabel Sánchez; he apparently never knew his biological parents. He had a close relationship with his adoptive mother, a Spanish immigrant from Andalusia. One of his initiatives as a member of the Chamber of Deputies was to propose the Dia da Mãe Adotiva (Adoptive Mother's Day), to be celebrated on the third Sunday of May. Hernandes was educated in a Catholic school and, in addition to his native Portuguese, he was fluent in Spanish and French.

=== Fashion stylist ===
Hernandes began his career as a stylist at the age of 16. In the 1960s, he gained national fame as a designer of haute couture.

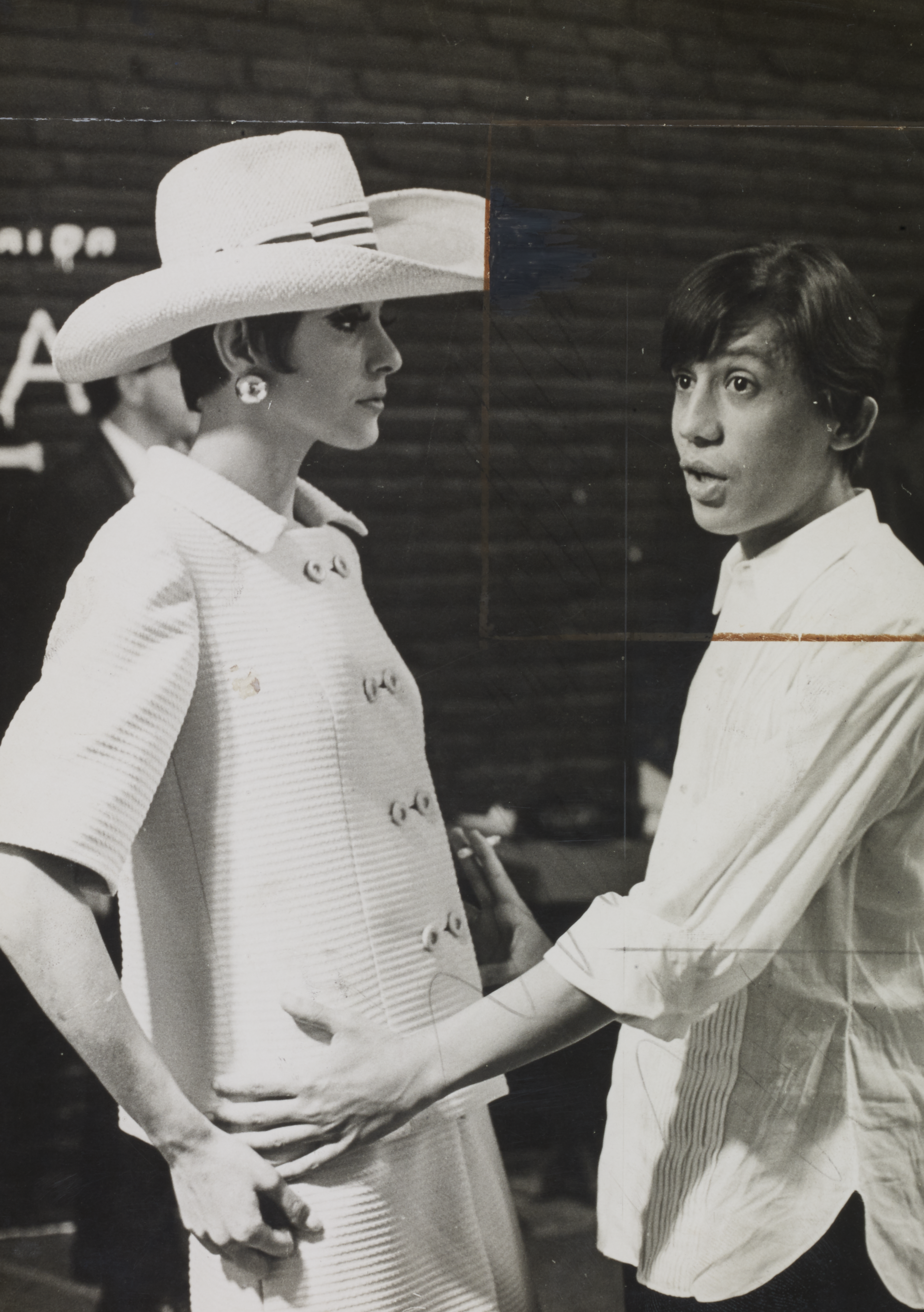
Clodovil as a fashion designer in 1971

=== Television ===
In the 1980s, Hernandes became a television personality with appearances on Rede Globo's TV Mulher, one of the first Brazilian shows dedicated to contemporary women. His career as a TV presenter experienced ups and downs throughout the 1990s. Although he had a strong female following, his explicit right-wing positions and unstable relations with co-workers led to frequent job changes.

After his breakthrough on TV Mulher, Clodovil was dismissed from the programme hosted by Marília Gabriela and sexologist and future São Paulo Secretary of Tourism, Marta Suplicy. In 1982, when Walter Clark, Globo's former director general, was invited to become a director at the Rede Bandeirantes network, Clodovil hosted his own programme there. In the 1993 TV season, he hosted a show on Rede Manchete, but the network, based in Rio de Janeiro, suffered a severe financial crisis, strikes, and partial suspension of its scheduled national broadcast. Adolpho Bloch regained control of the network through legal action, and Clodovil left the channel in early May due to past differences with his former employer.

In 2006 in São Paulo, Clodovil was portrayed in a musical. He advocated for the preservation of the Mata Atlântica in the Ubatuba region and for minority rights in the lower house. One of his planned projects was Casa Clô, a foundation to assist women not supported by official social assistance programmes.

Clodovil also trained as an actor and singer. He designed evening gowns for Miss Brasil and Miss Universe contestants, including Sandra Mara Ferreira and Sandra Guimarães de Oliveira.

Some of his controversial statements on Rede TV! led to legal consequences affecting his artistic career. He was the presenter of Clodovil Por Excelência (Clodovil By Excellence) on the TVJB network, which launched in March 2007.

== Views ==
In an interview with Rádio Tupi on 27 October 2006, Clodovil Hernandes made statements denying the Holocaust and claiming that the September 11 attacks were manipulated. In the same interview, he referred to black people as "complex creoles." To justify his opinions, he stated that there is an "extinguished power, that is in the underground of things" and added, "People are led to believe. When there was that incident with the Twin Towers there were no Americans and no Jews."

The president of the Israeli Federation of Rio, Osias Wurman, expressed outrage at Clodovil's statements, noting that they came from a member of a minority group that also experiences prejudice. Wurman filed a court action against Clodovil, accusing him of racism, and sent copies of the interview to the State Department of Human Rights, state deputies, and nongovernmental organizations linked to the black movement.

== Congressman ==
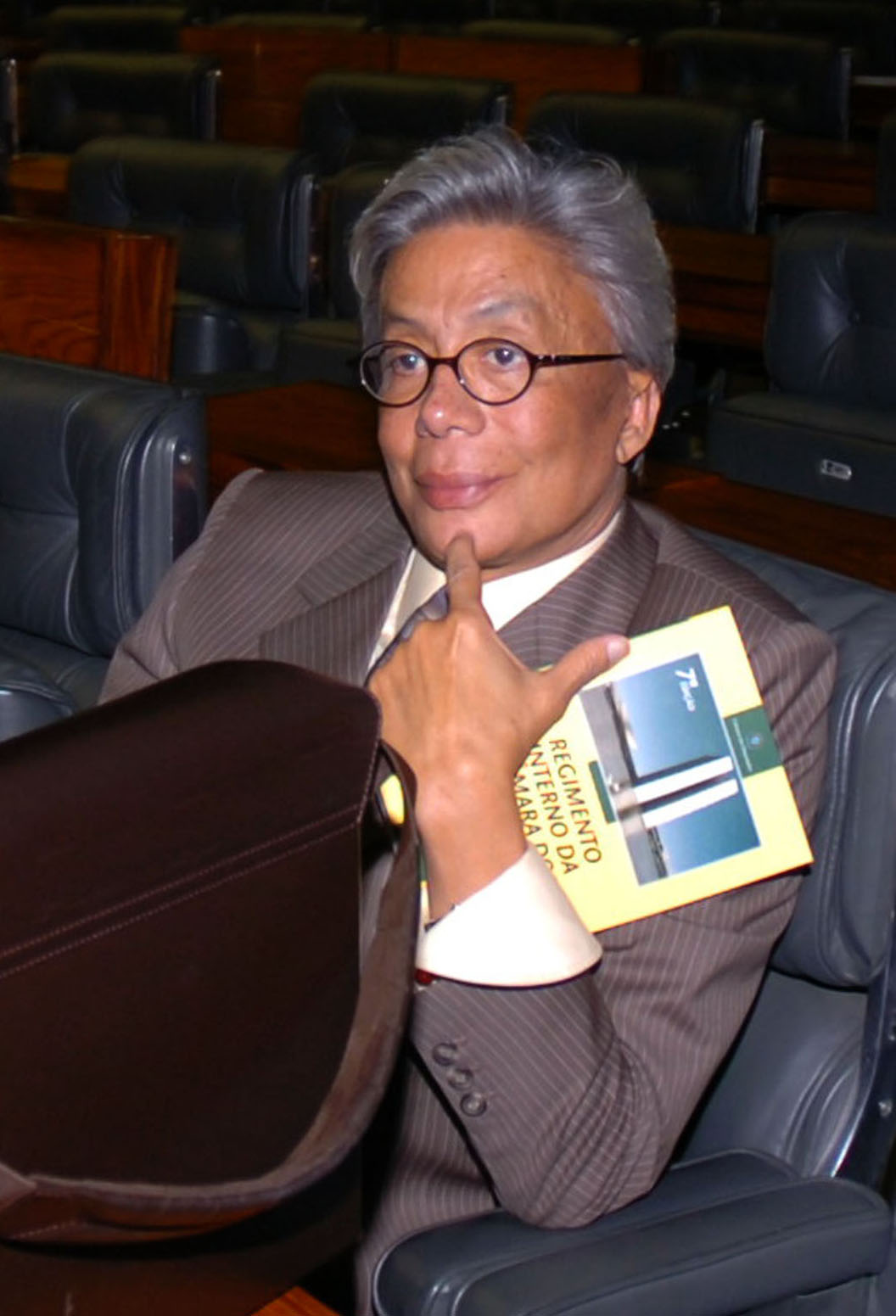
Hernandes in Brasília in 2007.

In the 2006 elections, Clodovil Hernandes was elected federal congressman for the state of São Paulo, receiving 493,951 votes (2.43% of the valid votes), making him the third most voted candidate in the state. He ran as a member of the Christian Labour Party. His campaign slogan was: "Brasília will never be the same."

As a congressman, Clodovil supported legislation that banned toys resembling tobacco products, restricted violent images in television newscasts during family viewing hours, and proposed reducing the number of members in the Brazilian parliament.

== Death ==
Clodovil Hernandes died in Brasília at 18:50 BRT on 17 March 2009, aged 71, following a stroke.

== Television career ==
- TV Mulher (Rede Globo, 1980 season)
- Clô para os Íntimos (Rede Manchete, 1987-1988 seasons)
- Noite de Gala (CNT, 1993–1995)
- Clô Soft (Rede Bandeirantes, 1996–1997)
- A Casa é Sua (Rede TV!, 2004–2005)
- Clodovil Por Excelência (Rede JB, soon on April season)

== Political phrases ==
=== 2006 campaign ===
- Brasília will never be the same.
- I will not promise anything; I will report [any kind of corruption] that comes directly to me.

== Theatral career ==
- Elas por Elas (2006)
