= Márcia Goldschmidt =

Brazilian television presenter, writer, digital influencer, YouTuber and businesswoman

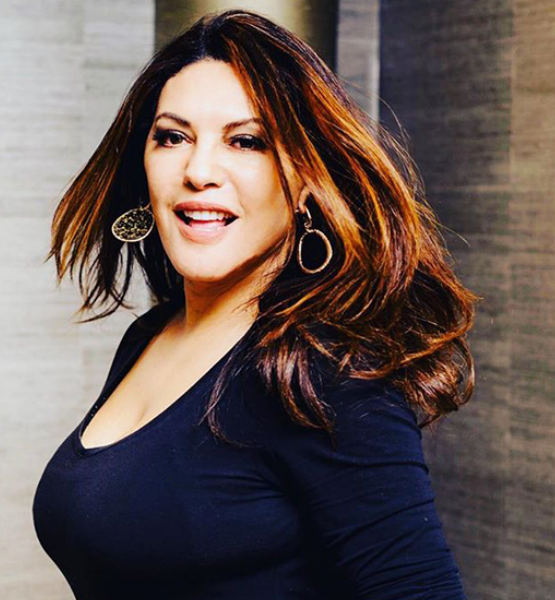
- Born: July 22, 1962 (age 64); São Paulo, Brazil
- Occupations: TV presenter, writer, digital influencer, YouTuber and businesswoman
- Years active: 1998–present

Márcia von Goldschmidt-Rothschild, better known as Márcia Goldschmidt (born July 22, 1962) is a Brazilian television presenter, writer, digital influencer, YouTuber and businesswoman.

== Personal life ==
Goldschmidt-Rothschild was born into a humble family and began working as a nanny at the age of nine. She lived in Paris in the mid-1980s where she worked at an agency helping Brazilian artists who went to work in France. Six years later, she returned to Brazil and married a Swiss, Baron Cyril von Goldschmidt-Rothschild, and had a son.

In Brazil, she set up the relationships agency Happy End and she was subsequently invited to present a program on the extinct TV channel Rede Mulher (currently Record News), also titled Happy End.

== Career ==
Two years later, she read a newspaper advertisement saying that the SBT TV channel was looking for a female presenter to host a talk show based on the American TV presenter Ricki Lake. She won and created the talk show Márcia, which later became a big success nationwide.

Goldschmidt-Rothschild wrote four self-help books, Dicas para um primeiro encontro com final feliz (Tips for a First Meeting With Happy Ending), Poder Sexual Feminino: Você Sabe Usar o Seu? (Female Sexual Power: Do You Know How to Use Yours?), Amor Sem Dor: 20 Estratégias Para Mudar Sua Vida Amorosa Já (Love Without Pain: 20 Strategies to Change Your Love Life Now) and O Problema é Você! (The Problem is You!).
